= One More Time Tour =

2024 concert tour by Blink-182

One More Time... Tour
- Tour by Blink-182
- Location: North America
- Associated album: One More Time...
- Start date: June 20, 2024
- End date: November 9, 2024
- Legs: 1
- No. of shows: 32
- Supporting acts: Pierce the Veil; Alexisonfire; Astronoid; Drain; Ekkstacy; Hot Milk; Jxdn; Landon Barker; Live Without

Blink-182 concert chronology
- World Tour 2023/2024 (2023–24); One More Time Tour (2024); Missionary Impossible (2025)

The One More Time... Tour was a concert tour by American rock band Blink-182. As opposed to the band's extensive World Tour 2023/2024, this domestic tour was in support of the band's ninth studio album, One More Time... (2023). The band played thirty shows across North America in mid-2024, at stadiums and arenas, alongside main support from Pierce the Veil, as well as Astronoid, Drain, jxdn, Landon Barker, Hot Milk, Live Without, EKKSTACY, and Alexisonfire on select dates. The tour also included festival stops at Lollapalooza, Austin City Limits and Ocean City Calling.

The tour was the first time the band has played in the round; the circular stage design was shaped after the band's signature smiley logo. It was also notable for its setlist, which incorporated for the first time renditions of songs from the trio's side projects, including +44 and Box Car Racer. The One More Time Tour was a major commercial success, ranking as the tenth best-selling rock tour of the year, grossing over $118.7 million dollars across its 61 shows. Critically, the tour was widely praised for the band’s renewed energy, strong performances, and effective mix of nostalgia and more reflective newer material.

== Reception ==
=== Boxscore ===
Billboard ranked it the tenth best-selling rock tour of 2024, selling over 1.1 million tickets and grossing $118.7 million across its 61 shows. Their best individual show was the concert at SoFi Stadium in Inglewood, California, with a ticket count of 50,492 and a gross of $5.78 million according to Pollstar.

=== Critical reviews ===
Reviews of the One More Time Tour were overwhelmingly positive, with critics praising the band’s strong live form, renewed energy, and balance of nostalgia with newer, more reflective material. Osvaldo Espino of the Miami New Times called the trio "one of the most in-demand live acts" of 2024, and wrote that "It felt like a victory lap for a group that has gone through so much together [...] Simply put, Blink-182 has never sounded better." Their sold-out hometown at Petco Park in San Diego was well-received by George Varga from the San Diego Union-Tribune: "Very few veteran bands these days dare to include so many songs from their newest album, let alone a pop-punk band bringing its pyrotechnics-punctuated stadium show to a finish with a contemplative ballad about the frailty of life."

The Arizona Republic's Ed Masley called the trio "older, wiser, more reflective" in person. Kevin Slane from Boston.com said the three "turn[ed] the home of the Red Sox into a raucous, fireworks-filled sing-along." Their Lollapalooza set was well-received; "their set captured what keeps Blink-182 popular more than 30 years on," wrote Nina Cocoran of Rolling Stone. Gabriel Saulog from Billboard concurred: "With the awe-struck nature of the crowd, the group has ultimately proven that they’ve still got it — and are unlikely to lose their magnanimous spark." A negative review from a student paper, critiquing the gig as "cringe-worthy and repulsive," went viral, prompting DeLonge to mock it: "I love this band," he wrote. Selena Fragassi from the Chicago Sun-Times offered a rebuttal:

Not that anyone took offense — to any of it. If you don’t have fun at a Blink-182 show, then you’re just doing it wrong. The trio has had a whole lifeline built around youthful nostalgia and just plain irreverence for anything serious. We have enough of that to deal with in our daily lives anyway, so why not take 90 minutes off?

== Set list ==
This set list is from the concert on June 20, 2024 in Orlando, Florida. It is not intended to represent all shows from the tour. Notably, this tour marks the first time the band has incorporated any songs from its side projects, including +44 and Box Car Racer.

1. "Feeling This"
2. "The Rock Show"
3. "Man Overboard"
4. "Aliens Exist"
5. "Dance with Me"
6. "Obvious"
7. "Bored to Death"
8. "Edging"
9. "Up All Night"
10. "More Than You Know"
11. "M+M's"
12. "Stay Together for the Kids"
13. "Not Now"
14. "Can't Go Back"
15. "I Miss You"
16. "Down"
17. "When Your Heart Stops Beating" (partial, +44 cover)
18. "There Is" (partial, Box Car Racer cover)
19. "Fuck Face"
20. "Anthem Part 3"
21. "Always"
22. "What's My Age Again?"
23. "First Date"
24. "All the Small Things"
25. "Dammit"
26. "One More Time"

=== Alterations ===
- During the Miami concert on June 21, 2024, "Easy Target" and "Carousel" were performed, replacing "Obvious" and "M+M's" on the set list.
- During the San Antonio concert on June 24, 2024, "Obvious" and "Going Away to College" were performed, replacing "Easy Target" and "Carousel" on the setlist

== Tour dates ==
List of 2024 concerts
Date	City	Country	Venue	Opening acts
June 20, 2024	Orlando	United States	Kia Center	Pierce the Veil jxdn
June 21, 2024	Miami	United States	Kaseya Center	Pierce the Veil jxdn
June 24, 2024	San Antonio	United States	Frost Bank Center	Pierce the Veil; Live Without
June 25, 2024	Fort Worth	United States	Dickies Arena	Pierce the Veil; Live Without
June 27, 2024	Denver	United States	Ball Arena	Pierce the Veil; Drain
June 30, 2024	San Diego	United States	Petco Park	Pierce the Veil; Hot Milk
July 2, 2024	Glendale	United States	Desert Diamond Arena	Pierce the Veil; Hot Milk
July 3, 2024	Las Vegas	United States	T-Mobile Arena	Pierce the Veil; Hot Milk
July 6, 2024	Inglewood (Note: Promoted as Los Angeles.)	United States	SoFi Stadium	Pierce the Veil; Hot Milk
July 8, 2024	Fresno	United States	Save Mart Center	Pierce the Veil; Hot Milk
July 9, 2024	San Francisco	United States	Chase Center	Pierce the Veil; Hot Milk
July 11, 2024	Salt Lake City	United States	Delta Center	Pierce the Veil; Landon Barker
July 13, 2024	Portland	United States	Moda Center	Pierce the Veil; Landon Barker
July 14, 2024	Quincy	United States	Gorge Amphitheatre	Pierce the Veil; Landon Barker
July 21, 2024	New York City (Note: Promoted as Flushing.)	United States	Citi Field	Pierce the Veil; EKKSTACY
July 23, 2024	Boston	United States	Fenway Park	Pierce the Veil; EKKSTACY
July 24, 2024	Hartford	United States	Xfinity Theatre	Pierce the Veil; EKKSTACY
July 26, 2024	Philadelphia	United States	Wells Fargo Center	Pierce the Veil; Astronoid
July 27, 2024	Washington, D.C.	United States	Capital One Arena	Pierce the Veil; Astronoid
July 29, 2024	Greenville	United States	Bon Secours Wellness Arena	Pierce the Veil; Astronoid
July 30, 2024	Raleigh	United States	PNC Arena	Pierce the Veil; Astronoid
August 1, 2024	Lexington	United States	Rupp Arena	Pierce the Veil; Astronoid
August 2, 2024	Indianapolis	United States	Gainbridge Fieldhouse	Pierce the Veil; Astronoid
August 4, 2024 (Note: The concert on August 4, 2024, is set to be a part of Lollapalooza 2024.)	Chicago	United States	Grant Park	—N/a
August 6, 2024	Minneapolis	United States	Target Center	Pierce the Veil; Astronoid
August 7, 2024	Milwaukee	United States	Fiserv Forum	Pierce the Veil; Astronoid
August 12, 2024	Detroit	United States	Little Caesars Arena	Pierce the Veil; Hot Milk
August 13, 2024	Columbus	United States	Schottenstein Center	Pierce the Veil; Hot Milk
August 15, 2024	Toronto	Canada	Rogers Centre	Pierce the Veil; Alexisonfire; Hot Milk
September 27, 2024 (Note: The concert on September 27, 2024, was part of Ocean City Calling.)	Ocean City	United States	Ocean City Beach	—N/a
October 4, 2024 (Note: These concerts were part of Austin City Limits 2024)	Austin	United States	Zilker Park	—N/a
October 11, 2024	Austin	United States	Zilker Park	—N/a
November 9, 2024	Mexico City	Mexico	Estadio GNP Seguros	Pierce the Veil; Petey; Allison

=== Cancelled dates ===
List of cancelled concerts
Date	City	Country	Venue	Reason
August 9, 2024	Kansas City	United States	T-Mobile Center	Illness
August 10, 2024	St. Louis	United States	Enterprise Center	Illness
September 29, 2024 (Note: The concert on September 29, 2024, was set to be a part of South Star Music Festival.)	Huntsville	United States	John Hunt Park	Hurricane Helene
