= Missionary Impossible (Blink-182) =

2025 concert tour by Blink-182

- Tour by Blink-182
- Location: United States
- Start date: August 28, 2025
- End date: October 19, 2025
- Legs: 1
- No. of shows: 24
- Supporting acts: Alkaline Trio; Drug Church; Scowl; Landon Barker; Beauty School Dropout; End It; Liily

Blink-182 concert chronology
- One More Time Tour (2024); Missionary Impossible (2025)

Missionary Impossible was a concert tour by the American rock band Blink-182. The tour began on August 28, 2025, in Hollywood, Florida and concluded on October 19, 2025, in Las Vegas. The tour was promoted as a return to the band’s punk roots, with a career-spanning setlist featuring major hits, fan favorites, and songs not performed live in decades. The production featured a stage backdrop designed to resemble a grimy punk club covered in flyers. It included main support from Alkaline Trio, as well as Drug Church, Scowl, Landon Barker, Beauty School Dropout, End It and Liily on select dates.

Reviews of the tour were largely positive, with critics praising the band’s energetic performances, chemistry, and ability to balance nostalgic pop-punk anthems with a more seasoned stage presence.

== Background ==
For this tour, the band announced that it would "lean into [their] punk roots, with a setlist packed with classics spanning their entire catalogue". The tour was announced on April 8, 2025. Each show began with a humorous intro from Ultimate Fighting Championship (UFC) announcer Bruce Buffer, as though the band are fighters in a match. The set's backdrop was adorned with dozens of flyers, designed to look like a grimy punk club, with an industrial lighting rig overhead.

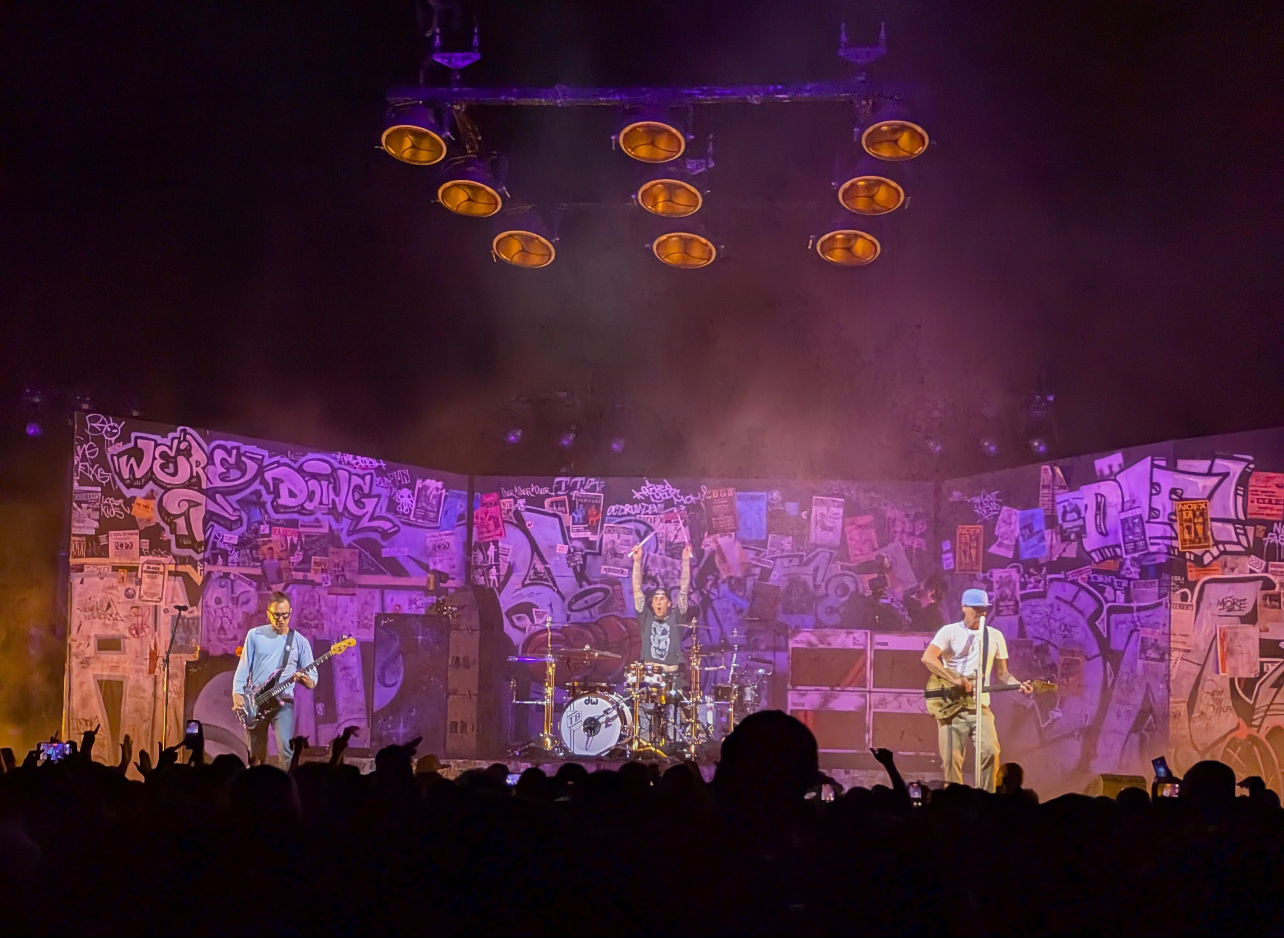
blink-182 performing in Palm Springs, California on October 4, 2025

The tour's setlist included both hits and deep cuts, including several songs the band has not played live in decades. These included "Josie" from Dude Ranch (1997), "Roller Coaster" and "Online Songs" from Take Off Your Pants and Jacket (2001), "Wishing Well" and "Natives" from Neighborhoods (2011), as well as a cover of the Descendents' "Hope", which the band had not played live since 2003.

Highlights of the tour included Matt Skiba, who replaced Tom DeLonge from 2015 to 2022, occasionally joining the band on stage to play "Bored to Death". Additionally, the band had Descendents guitarist Stephen Egerton sit in on their "Hope" cover both at their Riot Fest headlining set and at another show the following week in Rogers, Arkansas.

== Reception ==
Reviews of the Missionary Impossible Tour were mostly positive, praising the band's energetic nostalgia, strong chemistry, and seasoned performances. Jim Shahen Jr., for the Times Union, called the Saratoga Springs gig “nostalgia-fueled [and] energetic." Shawn Macomber of the Miami New Times reviewed the tour's first stop and marveled at "vital and alive Blink-182 sounds more than three decades in," describing their onstage unity as "something transcendent and multifaceted [...] If this is growing up, may we all age so gracefully." Scott Mervis, reporting from the Four Chord Fest for the Pittsburgh Post-Gazette, praised the "intrac[ies]" that their more mature material added to the set, overall commending their "goofy, frantic fun and great teen angst anthems."

Murjani Rawls, reviewing their Sea Hear Now set for NJ.com, called "the trio very much on top of their game. As much as they joked about taking a break and swigging Gatorade backstage in their "old age," the Southern Californian threesome met each song with a veteran mindset." On the other hand, Selena Fragassi from the Chicago Sun-Times found the band's juvenile humor "stale" and unfunny.

== Set list ==
This set list is from the concert on August 28, 2025 in Hollywood, Florida. It is not intended to represent all shows from the tour.

1. "The Rock Show"
2. "First Date"
3. "Josie"
4. "Anthem Part Two"
5. "Online Songs"
6. "M+M's"
7. "Fuck Face"
8. "Natives" (Stage backdrop changes)
9. "Feeling This"
10. "Down"
11. "Turpentine"
12. "Can't Go Back"
13. "Wishing Well"
14. "Stay Together for the Kids"
15. "Roller Coaster"
16. "Dance with Me"
17. "Bored to Death"
18. "I Miss You"
19. "More Than You Know"
20. "Hope" (Descendents cover)
21. "What's My Age Again?"
22. "All the Small Things"
23. "Dammit"
24. "One More Time"

== Tour dates ==
List of 2025 concerts, showing date, city, country, venue, and opening act(s)
Date	City	Country	Venue	Opening acts
August 28, 2025	Hollywood	United States	Hard Rock Live	Alkaline Trio; Beauty School Dropout
August 29, 2025	Tampa	United States	MidFlorida Credit Union Amphitheatre	Alkaline Trio; Beauty School Dropout
September 1, 2025	Charleston	United States	Credit One Stadium	Alkaline Trio; Beauty School Dropout
September 3, 2025	Raleigh	United States	Coastal Credit Union Music Park	Alkaline Trio; Beauty School Dropout
September 4, 2025	Virginia Beach	United States	Veterans United Home Loans Amphitheater	Alkaline Trio; Beauty School Dropout
September 6, 2025	Bethel	United States	Bethel Woods Center for the Arts	Alkaline Trio; Beauty School Dropout
September 7, 2025	Saratoga Springs	United States	Saratoga Performing Arts Center	Alkaline Trio; Drug Church
September 9, 2025	Gilford	United States	BankNH Pavilion	Alkaline Trio; Drug Church
September 11, 2025	Darien Center	United States	Darien Lake Amphitheater	Alkaline Trio; Drug Church
September 13, 2025 (Note: The September 13, 2025, concert was part of Four Chord Music Fest.)	Washington	United States	EQT Park	—N/a
September 14, 2025 (Note: The September 14, 2025, concert was part of Sea.Hear.Now Festival.)	Asbury Park	United States	Asbury Park Beach & Boardwalk	—N/a
September 16, 2025	Cincinnati	United States	Riverbend Music Center	Alkaline Trio; Drug Church
September 17, 2025	Noblesville	United States	Ruoff Music Center	Alkaline Trio; Drug Church
September 19, 2025 (Note: The September 19, 2025, concert was part of Riot Fest.)	Chicago	United States	Douglass Park	—N/a
September 21, 2025 (Note: The September 21, 2025, concert was part of Shaky Knees Music Festival.)	Atlanta	United States	Piedmont Park	—N/a
September 22, 2025	Huntsville	United States	Orion Amphitheater	Alkaline Trio; Scowl
September 24, 2025	Rogers	United States	Walmart Arkansas Music Pavilion	Alkaline Trio; Scowl
September 26, 2025	Maryland Heights (Note: Promoted as St. Louis.)	United States	Hollywood Casino Amphitheatre	Alkaline Trio; End It
September 27, 2025	Kansas City	United States	T-Mobile Center	Alkaline Trio; End It
October 2, 2025 (Note: The October 2, 2025, concert was part of Aftershock Festival.)	Sacramento	United States	Discovery Park	—N/a
October 4, 2025	Thousand Palms (Note: Promoted as Palm Desert.)	United States	Acrisure Arena	Alkaline Trio; Landon Barker
October 5, 2025	Thousand Palms	United States	Acrisure Arena	Alkaline Trio; Liily
October 18, 2025 (Note: These concerts are part of the When We Were Young Fest)	Winchester (Note: Promoted as Las Vegas)	United States	Las Vegas Festival Grounds	—N/a
October 19, 2025	Winchester	United States	Las Vegas Festival Grounds	—N/a
