= List of awards and nominations received by Blink-182 =

Blink-182 awards and nominations
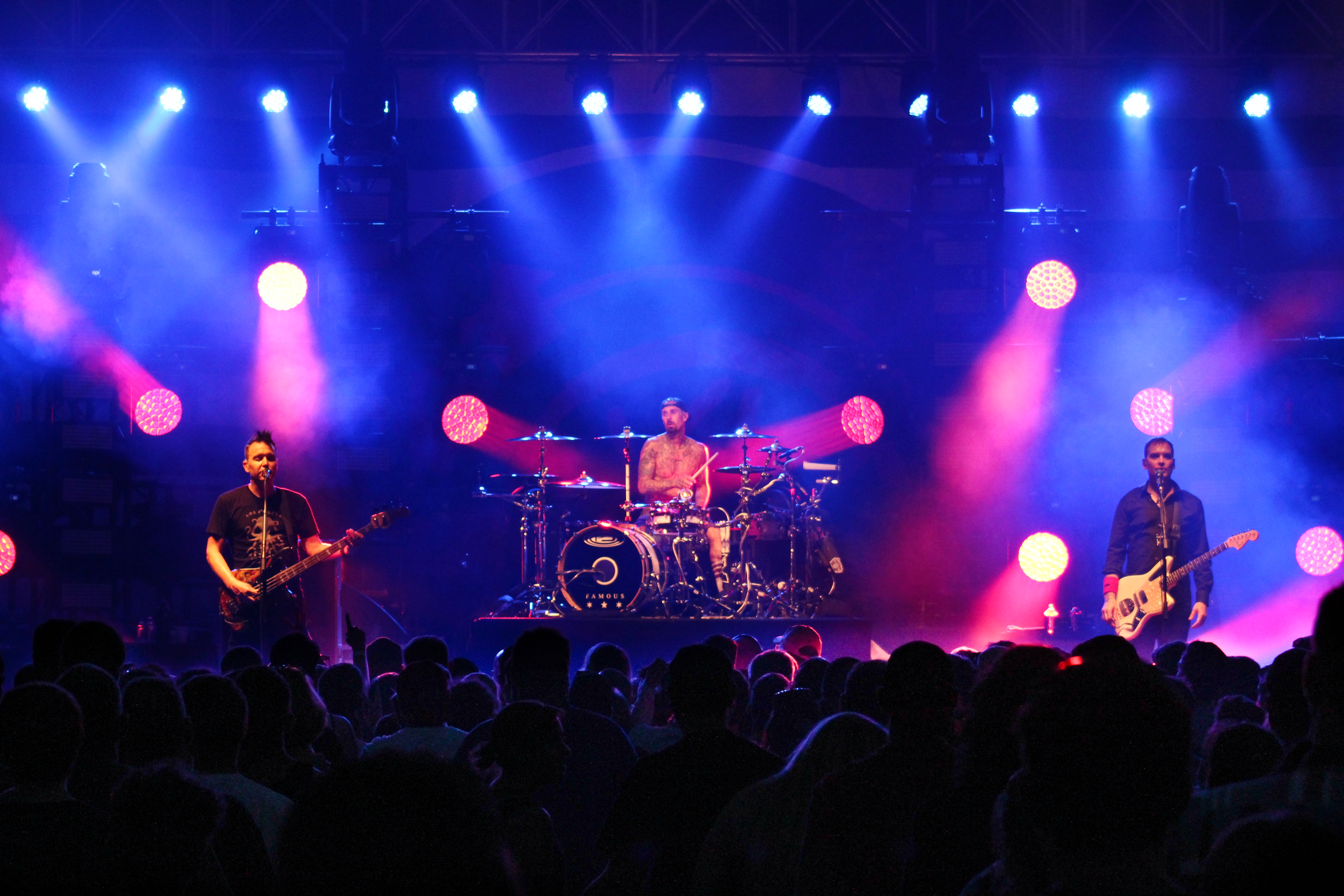
- Blink-182 performing in 2016. From left to right: Mark Hoppus, Travis Barker, and Matt Skiba.
Awards and nominations
Award	Wins	Nominations
Billboard	0	2
Brit	0	2
Echo	0	2
Grammy	0	1
Kerrang!	2	5
MTV Europe	2	4
MTV VMA	1	7
Nickelodeon Kids' Choice	1	2
Teen Choice	3	10
Alternative Press Music Awards	0	1
Blockbuster Entertainment Awards	1	1
California Music Awards	1	4
Global Awards	0	1
Heavy Music Awards	0	1
iHeartRadio Much Music Video Awards	1	5
iHeartRadio Music Awards	1	6
Pollstar Awards	0	2
Radio Music Awards	0	1
San Diego Music Awards	10	14

Totals (Note: Certain award groups do not simply award one winner. They acknowledge several different recipients, have runners-up, and have third place. Since this is a specific recognition and is different from losing an award, runner-up mentions are considered wins in this award tally. For simplification and to avoid errors, each award in this list has been presumed to have had a prior nomination.)
- Wins: 24
- Nominations: 71

American rock band Blink-182 has received 24 awards from 71 nominations. They are the recipients of ten San Diego Music Awards, three Teen Choice Awards, two Kerrang! Awards, two MTV Europe Music Awards, one Blockbuster Entertainment Awards, one MTV Video Music Awards, one Nickelodeon Kids' Choice Awards, one California Music Awards, one Brits Billion Award, one iHeartRadio Music Awards and one iHeartRadio Much Music Video Awards.

== Alternative Press Music Awards ==
Year	Nominee / work	Award	Result
2017	Blink-182	Artist of the Year	Nominated

== Billboard Music Awards ==
Year	Nominee / work	Award	Result
1999	"What's My Age Again?"	Modern Rock Track of the Year	Nominated
2024	Blink-182	Top Duo / Group	Nominated

== Blockbuster Entertainment Awards ==
Year	Nominee / work	Award	Result
2000	Blink-182	Favorite Group – New Artist	Won

== Brit Awards ==
Year	Nominee / work	Award	Result
2024	Blink-182	International Group of the Year	Nominated
2024	Blink-182	BRIT Billion Award	Won

== California Music Awards ==
The California Music Awards (formerly known as the Bammy Awards) is an annual awards ceremony established in 1978 by BAM (Bay Area Music) magazine editor Dennis Erokan.

Year	Nominee / work	Award	Result
2000	Enema of the State	Outstanding Album	Nominated
2000	Blink-182	Outstanding Group	Nominated
2000	"All the Small Things"	Outstanding Single	Nominated
2004	Blink-182	Outstanding Hard Rock Album	Won

== Echo Awards ==
Year	Nominee / work	Award	Result
2001	Blink-182	Best International Rock/Alternative Group	Nominated
2001	Blink-182	Best International Newcomer	Nominated

== Global Awards ==
Year	Nominee / work	Award	Result
2024	Blink-182	Best Rock and Indie	Nominated

== Grammy Awards ==
Year	Nominee / work	Award	Result
2017	California	Best Rock Album	Nominated

== Heavy Music Awards ==
Year	Nominee / work	Award	Result
2024	One More Time...	Best Album	Nominated

== iHeartRadio Much Music Video Awards ==
Year	Nominee / work	Award	Result
2000	"All the Small Things"	Best International Video	Nominated
2001	"The Rock Show"	Best International Video - Group	Nominated
2001	"The Rock Show"	People's Choice: Favourite International Group	Nominated
2002	"First Date"	Best International Video - Group	Nominated
2002	"First Date"	People's Choice: Favourite International Group	Won

== iHeartRadio Music Awards ==
Year	Nominee / work	Award	Result
2017	Blink-182	Alternative Rock Band of the Year	Nominated
2017	"Bored to Death"	Alternative Rock Song of the Year	Nominated
2023	"Edging"	Alternative Song of the Year	Nominated
2024	Blink-182	Alternative Artist of the Year	Nominated
2024	"One More Time"	Alternative Song of the Year	Won
2024	Blink-182	Duo/Group of the Year	Nominated

== Kerrang! Awards ==
The Kerrang! Awards is an annual awards ceremony established in 1993 by Kerrang!. Blink-182 has received two awards.

Year	Nominee / work	Award	Result
2000	"All the Small Things"	Best Video	Won
2004	Blink-182	Best Album	Nominated
2004	Blink-182	Best International Band	Nominated
2004	"I Miss You"	Best Video	Nominated
2016	Blink-182	The Icon Award	Won

== MTV Europe Music Awards ==
The MTV Europe Music Awards is an annual awards ceremony established in 1994 by MTV Europe. Blink-182 has received two awards.

Year	Nominee / work	Award	Result
2000	Blink-182	Best Group	Nominated
2000	"All the Small Things"	Best Video	Nominated
2000	Blink-182	Best New Act	Won
2001	Blink-182	Best Rock Act	Won

== MTV Video Music Awards ==
The MTV Video Music Awards is an annual awards ceremony established in 1984 by MTV. Blink-182 has received one award from six nominations.

Year	Nominee / work	Award	Result
2000	"All the Small Things"	Best Group Video	Won
2000	"All the Small Things"	Video of the Year	Nominated
2000	"All the Small Things"	Best Pop Video	Nominated
2002	"First Date"	Best Group Video	Nominated
2020	"Happy Days"	Best Rock Video	Nominated
2020	"Happy Days"	Best Music Video from Home	Nominated
2023	"Edging"	Best Alternative Video	Nominated

== Nickelodeon Kids' Choice Awards ==
The Nickelodeon Kids' Choice Awards is an annual awards show organized by Nickelodeon. Blink-182 has received one award.

Year	Nominee / work	Award	Result
2001	Blink-182	Favorite Band	Won
2025	Blink-182	Favorite Music Group	Nominated

== Pollstar Awards ==
Year	Nominee / work	Award	Result
2024	World Tour 2023/2024	Rock Tour of the Year	Nominated
2025	One More Time Tour	Rock Tour of the Year	Nominated

== Radio Music Awards ==
Year	Nominee / work	Award	Result
1999	Blink-182	Alternative Artist of the Year	Nominated

== San Diego Music Awards ==
Year	Nominee / work	Award	Result
1997	Dude Ranch	Best Alternative Album	Won
1998	Blink-182	Group of the Year	Won
1999	Blink-182	Group of the Year	Won
1999	Blink-182	Best Ska or Punk Band	Won
1999	Enema of the State	Album of the Year	Won
2000	Blink-182	Group of the Year	Won
2000	Blink-182	Best Punk Band	Won
2001	Take Off Your Pants and Jacket	Best Punk Album	Won
2001	Blink-182	Group of the Year	Won
2004	Blink-182	Best Punk Album	Won
2017	California	Album of the Year	Nominated
2020	Nine	Album of the Year	Nominated
2020	"Blame It on My Youth"	Song of the Year	Nominated
2023	"Edging"	Best Video	Nominated

== Teen Choice Awards ==
The Teen Choice Awards is an awards show presented annually by the Fox Broadcasting Company. Blink-182 has received three awards.

Year	Nominee / work	Award	Result
2000	Enema of the State	Choice Album	Nominated
2000	Blink-182	Choice Breakout Artist	Nominated
2000	"Adam's Song"	Choice Music Video	Nominated
2000	"All the Small Things"	Choice Single	Nominated
2000	Blink-182	Choice Rock Group	Won
2001	Blink-182	Choice Concert	Nominated
2001	Blink-182	Choice Rock Group	Won
2004	"I Miss You"	Choice Love Song	Won
2004	No Doubt & Blink-182	Choice Music Tour	Nominated
2004	"Feeling This"	Choice Rock Track	Nominated
