= One More Time... =

Studio album by Blink-182
- Released: October 20, 2023
- Recorded: January 2022 – June 2023
- Studios: The Waiting Room (Los Angeles); Jupiter Sound (San Diego) (Note: All tracks except "Edging"); Area 69 (San Diego) (Note: "Edging"); Califa (Los Angeles)
- Genres: Punk rock; pop-punk
- Length: 44:35
- Label: Columbia
- Producer: Travis Barker

Blink-182 chronology
Nine (2019)	One More Time... (2023)

Vinyl cover
- Vinyl artwork (Note: The CD release has a blue background, while the cassette release has a green background.)

Singles from One More Time...
- 1. "Edging" Released: October 14, 2022; 2. "One More Time" / "More Than You Know" Released: September 21, 2023; 3. "Dance with Me" Released: October 5, 2023; 4. "Fell in Love" Released: October 13, 2023; 5. "You Don't Know What You've Got" Released: October 18, 2023

Singles from One More Time... Part-2
- 1. "All in My Head" / "No Fun" Released: August 23, 2024

One More Time... (Note: Stylized in all caps.) is the ninth studio album by American rock band Blink-182, released on October 20, 2023, through Columbia Records. The album marks the return of guitarist/vocalist Tom DeLonge following his departure from the band in 2015. DeLonge was prompted to return after bassist/vocalist Mark Hoppus was diagnosed with lymphoma in 2021. Following a meeting between DeLonge and his former bandmates, the trio overcame lingering disputes, which later led to DeLonge's return.

Recorded over a span of seven months, One More Time... lyrically explores familiar territory like relationships and maturation, as well as lyrics inspired by the band's own history and Hoppus' battle with cancer. Barker handled the production, largely tracked at his Woodland Hills compound in the band's home state California. The album's digital artwork consists of black-and-white portraits of the trio while physical editions were printed with the band's signature smiley logo, drawn by famed graffiti artist Eric Haze.

One More Time... became the band's third number-one album on the Billboard 200 in the U.S., and reached the top five in a dozen other countries. Of its six pre-release singles, both "Edging" and the title track were top hits on the Alternative Airplay charts domestically. The album itself has generated songs with the highest total number of weeks spent at number one on said chart, with thirty-three weeks total. It received largely favorable responses from music critics, with most celebrating the band's back-to-basics approach. Blink-182 have promoted the album with their supporting tour and the top-grossing World Tour.

A deluxe version of the album, titled One More Time... Part-2, was released on September 6, 2024.

== Background ==
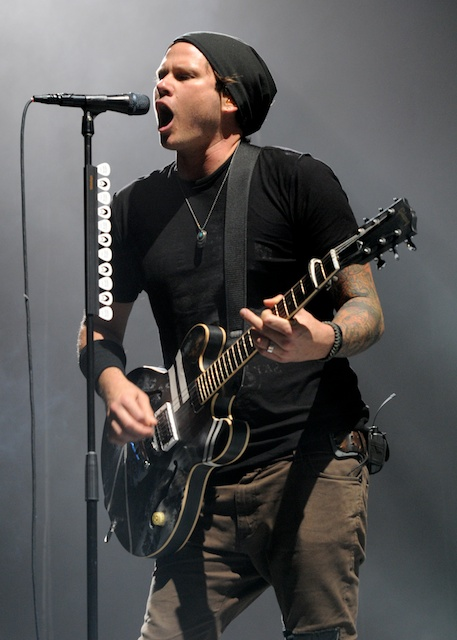
One More Time... features the return of founding guitarist/vocalist Tom DeLonge.

Blink-182 gained mainstream success with their third album Enema of the State, and continued with Take Off Your Pants and Jacket in 2001 and their untitled album in 2003. During this time, its core members developed considerable discord between each other, with Tom DeLonge at its center. This led to the band's 2005 breakup, which was announced as an indefinite hiatus to the public. Hoppus and Barker continued to collaborate in +44, while DeLonge formed Angels & Airwaves and had cut all ties with his former bandmates until 2008, when Barker was involved in a plane crash of which he was one of two survivors. Ultimately, the trio decided they still wanted to make music together, and announced their return the following year. During this time, the band released Neighborhoods in 2011, and an EP titled Dogs Eating Dogs in 2012. At the same time, DeLonge became more invested in non-musical activities, mostly related to his passion for UFOs and conspiracy theories. This halted the band's activities, and created more tension between the trio, eventually leading to his second departure from the group in 2015.

Rather than breaking up again, Hoppus and Barker enlisted Alkaline Trio singer and guitarist Matt Skiba to fill DeLonge's place. This iteration of the band proved more active, releasing California in 2016, which gave them their second no. 1 album since 2001, and Nine in 2019, and touring extensively in support of both releases. Meanwhile, DeLonge invested his time in his company, To the Stars, and Angels & Airwaves, but soon repaired his relationship with Barker. The two would also discuss when DeLonge could return to the band, but Hoppus, still holding some grievances, was uncertain. When DeLonge publicly discussed rejoining, it was not uncommon for Hoppus to deny the possibility. This changed in 2021 though when Hoppus was diagnosed with a rare form of lymphoma. According to Hoppus, DeLonge was one of the most supportive people during his chemotherapy, with the two speaking frequently up until Hoppus was declared cancer-free later that year.

Hoppus and DeLonge's reconnection prompted a secret meeting between them and Barker to reconvene and overcome old disputes. Soon after, they felt the time was right for DeLonge to rejoin the band. Skiba was unaware of DeLonge's return until it was publicly announced in 2022, though he had begun to question whether he was still in the band. Despite this, he showed both excitement and gratitude for the trio, and thanked fans for his time in the band. DeLonge reciprocated by privately reaching out to Skiba on social media to thank him for his time with the band.

== Writing and recording ==
One More Time... was recorded over a period of eighteen months, beginning in January 2022, partly at the band members' respective home studios, and mainly at Barker's studio, The Waiting Room. Barker had purchased this new studio space, in Woodland Hills, California, in 2020, which is where the trio most frequently convened. The complex's white-walled aesthetic led DeLonge and Hoppus to joke it looked like a "punk rock day spa". The band would meet "every other week" for three days at a time for writing sessions and tracking. Afterwards, the members would return to their home studios to further write and complete recording their parts. Much of the early recording was kept secret from the public, as the members wanted to approach DeLonge's return cautiously. Early recording was also stinted by Hoppus' cancer recovery, as chemotherapy had severely damaged both his body and vocal chords. The band first met as Hoppus was completing his final round of chemotherapy. According to Los Angeles Times reporter Amy Kaufman, the band initially progressed slowly, as "it took Hoppus a minute to trust their latest reconciliation [...] after years of DeLonge's inconsistency."

One More Time... also marks their first album to be entirely produced by Barker. Prior to the album, Barker had produced a few of the band's previous songs and worked with a few other artists, most notably with Machine Gun Kelly's Tickets to My Downfall (2020). He initially was reticent to broach the subject between the three—"it was a sensitive subject," he confessed in the interview with Kaufman—but simply took control of the process when the rest of the band left for the day, arranging and piecing together songs digitally. All of the guitars were recorded with Fractal's Axe-Fx processor, eliminating the lengthy time needed to solidify guitar tones. Engineer Aaron Rubin used this as a way of mitigating DeLonge's frequent tendency to re-write. Likewise, many of the songs utilize Barker's preset templates and digital plugins he had used at the Waiting Room for other artists. For One More Time..., Barker found himself "taking myself out of being in the band, and being a fan" in a way to help build the songs the way he wanted them to sound. Barker often thought back to their old producer, Jerry Finn, and what he would have done if he were still their producer. In response to a fan question following the album's release, Barker also stated that he would've dedicated the album in memory of Finn.

== Songs ==
"Anthem Part 3" addresses complacency and encourages self-improvement; with its staccato opening and title, it serves as a sequel in its series. "Dance with Me" is set on a dance floor, and features a prominent "olé olé olé" hook. Barker was meticulous in devising what meter to set the song at, and settled on an uptempo groove he felt maximized its danceability. "Fell in Love" interpolates The Cure classic "Close to Me" and recounts a drunken meeting at a party. "Terrified" originated as a demo between DeLonge and Barker before the band reformed; they felt it was an extension of the style they explored on Box Car Racer.

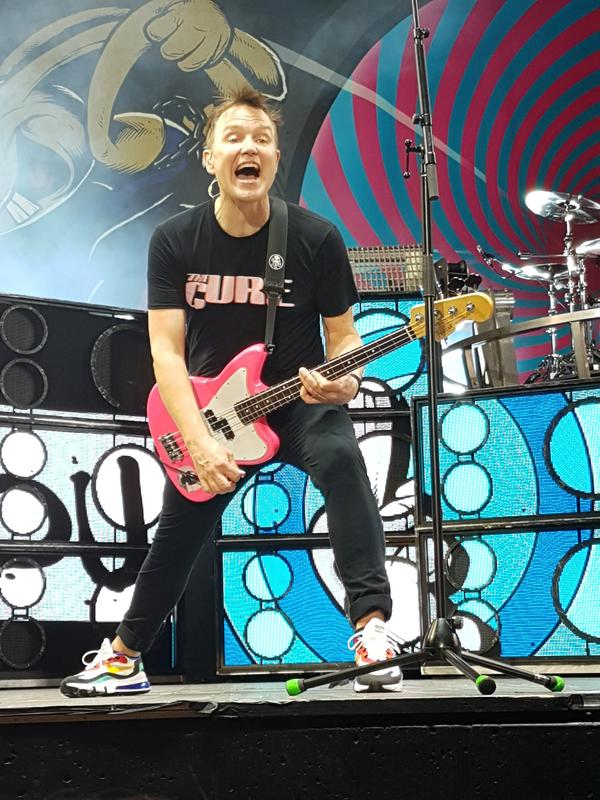
The album addresses bassist Mark Hoppus' battle with cancer.

The acoustic title track softly reflects on the band's history and questions why it requires tragedies to prompt reconciliation. As the song climaxes, the band's three members—Barker included, in a rare vocal spot—sing the song's refrain. "More Than You Know" opens with a despondent piano piece but grows in energy and pace; its unconventional chorus repeats "I don't feel pain, but I feel more than you'd ever know." Barker utilizes a double kick drum—typically used in metal—for the first time on each chorus, which adds to the aggression. "Turn This Off!" is a brief, off-color joke song, while "When We Were Young" salutes growing up. "Edging" is a bright, mid-tempo track that was the first song the band released for the album: "I wanted to imagine as a listener what I wanted to experience and at the same time as a band member what we wanted to make and say, and most importantly how it would sound production-wise in 2022," Barker said.

"You Don't Know What You've Got" directly chronicles Hoppus' battle with cancer. "Blink Wave" embraces new wave keyboards and synthesizers, while "Bad News" is a brisk, bitter missive to a relationship gone sour. "Turpentine" uses unrelated concepts, both comical and serious, to explore emptiness: "What if I'm not like the others? / A broken man, a Frankenstein," DeLonge sings. "Fuck Face" is a tribute to hardcore punk that was initially an unrelated demo Barker recorded for fun with longtime collaborator Tim Armstrong. "Other Side" is a tribute to Robert Ortiz, Hoppus' longtime bass technician, who died in 2021. "Childhood" compares the old and young by asking when a youthful sense of the world goes missing. Its outro infuses chiptune with a drum solo.

== Artwork ==
The cover artwork for One More Time... varies between its digital and physical editions. The digital cover features a black-and-white photograph of the band's three members—guitarist Tom DeLonge, bassist Mark Hoppus, and drummer Travis Barker—against a brick wall. Barker is positioned in the center, while DeLonge is photographed in profile. The artwork was initially withheld following the album's announcement, with digital services instead displaying a placeholder image bearing the message "THIS IS NOT OUR ALBUM COVER". Barker conceived the photograph's visual concept, drawing inspiration from Japanese fashion label Number (N)ine. The final cover was unveiled on October 18, 2023, two days before the album's release. The artwork for the album's deluxe edition, released in September 2024, features childhood photographs of the three band members.

The album's physical editions feature alternative artwork designed by American graphic artist Eric Haze, consisting of his hand-drawn interpretation of the band's signature smiley-face logo against a bright pink background. Haze, whose previous work includes artwork for the Beastie Boys, was approached by Barker to develop the band's updated visual identity. Barker specifically requested a design reminiscent of Haze's work for the Beastie Boys during their Check Your Head era, seeking his distinctive hand-drawn style. Haze's designs also included an updated Blink-182 wordmark and typography.

== Composition ==
Tom Walsh of Punktastic described One More Time... as a "genuinely good punk rock record", helping to appeal to more hardcore fans. Maya Georgi of Rolling Stone felt a similar sentiment, stating that the band is "at their best when they are channeling punk-rock energy" on the album. Matt Dunn of Ultimate Guitar said the album "perfectly coincides with the revival of pop punk".

== Release ==
The album's promotional cycle began with the announcement of the band's next world tour, as well as their reunion with DeLonge. News of his return had swirled in fan communities for months, but was officially announced on October 11, 2022, alongside the news that a new album was in the works. Later that week, the album's first single, "Edging", was also released, and pre-order sales for vinyl variants of the album also went up, though the LP lacked a title or release date. Due to the nature of DeLonge's return, the LP was considered to be greatly anticipated. The band did not conduct a traditional press tour for the album; their hour-length interview with radio host Zane Lowe was intended to be their only statement about the record.

In the lead-up to release, posters emblazoned with the album's title and the band's logo were plastered on walls in major cities across different countries in September 2023, including New York City, Toronto, Chicago, Sydney, Berlin, and more. The group's official site was updated with a "stall" page—a visual of a graffiti-tagged bathroom, with a digital clock icon counting down to the release of the album's second single. On September 18, the album's title was officially announced, as well as its release date. Later that week, the album's title track and "More Than You Know" were released. Three additional singles saw release prior to the album: "Dance with Me", "Fell in Love", and "You Don't Know What You've Got". After the album's initial bow, the band released a digital-exclusive expanded edition, adding two bonus tracks to the album titled "Cut Me Off" and "See You".

In June 2024, Hoppus announced a deluxe version of the album to be released on September 6, 2024. In August 2024, the deluxe release was revealed to be titled One More Time... Part-2, and includes eight additional songs.

== Commercial performance ==
One More Time... achieved strong international chart success. In the U.S., One More Time... became the band's third chart-topping album on the Billboard 200, debuting at number one the week following its release. Much of its 125,000 equivalent album units were driven by physical sales, with 101,000 copies sold in its first week. Its 11 vinyl variants helped mark the largest sales week for a rock album on vinyl that year, with 49,000 units. As of February 2024, the album has moved 247,000 units domestically.

Across the globe, the album was similarly well-received: in the United Kingdom, it debuted at number two on the UK Albums Chart, marking the group's sixth top 10 in the country. The album also reached number two on the main album charts in Australia, Austria, Canada, Germany, and Switzerland. In other major markets, it peaked within the top five in Belgium, Ireland, Italy, New Zealand, Portugal, and Scotland. Outside of its strongest-performing territories, One More Time... charted within the top 20 in countries including the Czech Republic, France, the Netherlands, and Spain. Worldwide, the album achieved 30 million streams in its first week.

The album's singles also proved commercially successful. "Edging" was a long-running number one hit on Billboard's Alternative Airplay chart, where it topped the charts for 13 weeks, while also becoming their first single on the Hot 100 since 2016's "Bored to Death". "One More Time" ultimately became an even greater success. An airplay juggernaut at Alternative Airplay, it peaked at number one for a record-setting twenty consecutive weeks, tied for the longest reign in the ranking's history. It also marked the first time Blink-182 achieved back-to-back number ones on that chart. As the group entered the Adult Pop Airplay chart for the first time in 18 years, "One More Time" ultimately became the group's first crossover hit since "I Miss You". A fair number of non-singles also proved successful, with "Anthem Part 3" in particular charting on the Bubbling Under Hot 100 chart.

== Reception ==
Professional ratings
Aggregate scores
Source	Rating
AnyDecentMusic?	7.1/10
Metacritic	71/100
Review scores
Source	Rating
AllMusic	4/5 stars
Clash	7/10
Dork	4/5 stars
The Guardian	3/5 stars
The Independent	2/5 stars
Kerrang!	4/5 stars
The Line of Best Fit	9/10
NME	3/5 stars
Pitchfork	5.2/10
Rolling Stone	4/5 stars

The album received mostly positive reviews upon its release. Metacritic, which assigns a normalized rating out of 100 to reviews from mainstream critics, scored the album at 71 out of 100, indicating "generally favorable reviews" based on 15 reviews.

Rolling Stone reviewer Maya Georgi gave the album high marks, observing, "As always, Blink-182 are at their best when they are channeling punk-rock energy and wailing tongue-in-cheek couplets against choppy guitars and Barker's driving rhythms." Kate Solomon from The Guardian felt that "despite the nods to mortality, Blink have not lost their knack for crafting thumping choruses," while Spin's Bobby Olivier felt the "explosive" album delivered: "this reconciliation feels fresh, fun [...] it's still the band's best work in 20 years." Matt Collar from AllMusic praised its lyrical depth, writing, "there's certainly the sense that blink-182 are working through the pain of the past two decades." Consequence columnist Paolo Ragusa considered it "a relatively safe album, all things considered, but for Blink-182, new ground isn't necessary."

In a mixed review, Stereogum's Pranav Trewn said "As an argument for the alchemic properties of this lineup configuration, the band really sounds like they have something to prove [...] but there are dull moments to be sure, enough that in aggregate those flashes of excitement quickly begin to fade from memory." NME reviewer Emma Wilkes found the album "a full circle moment [...] the issue is, however, that it's perhaps lacking in variety." Helen Brown of The Independent dismissed it as "hardly revelatory," while GQ writer Yang-Yi Goh found the tunes "glossy, efficient, and largely anodyne [...] most of the songs have had their rough edges sanded down too smooth, and feel more aimed at back-to-basics nostalgia than hard-earned progress." Pitchfork's pan of the album found writer Arielle Gordon bemoaning its regressive sound, commenting: "It feels disjointed and bloated, not to mention heavily indebted to the band members’ existing discography."

=== Criticism of production ===
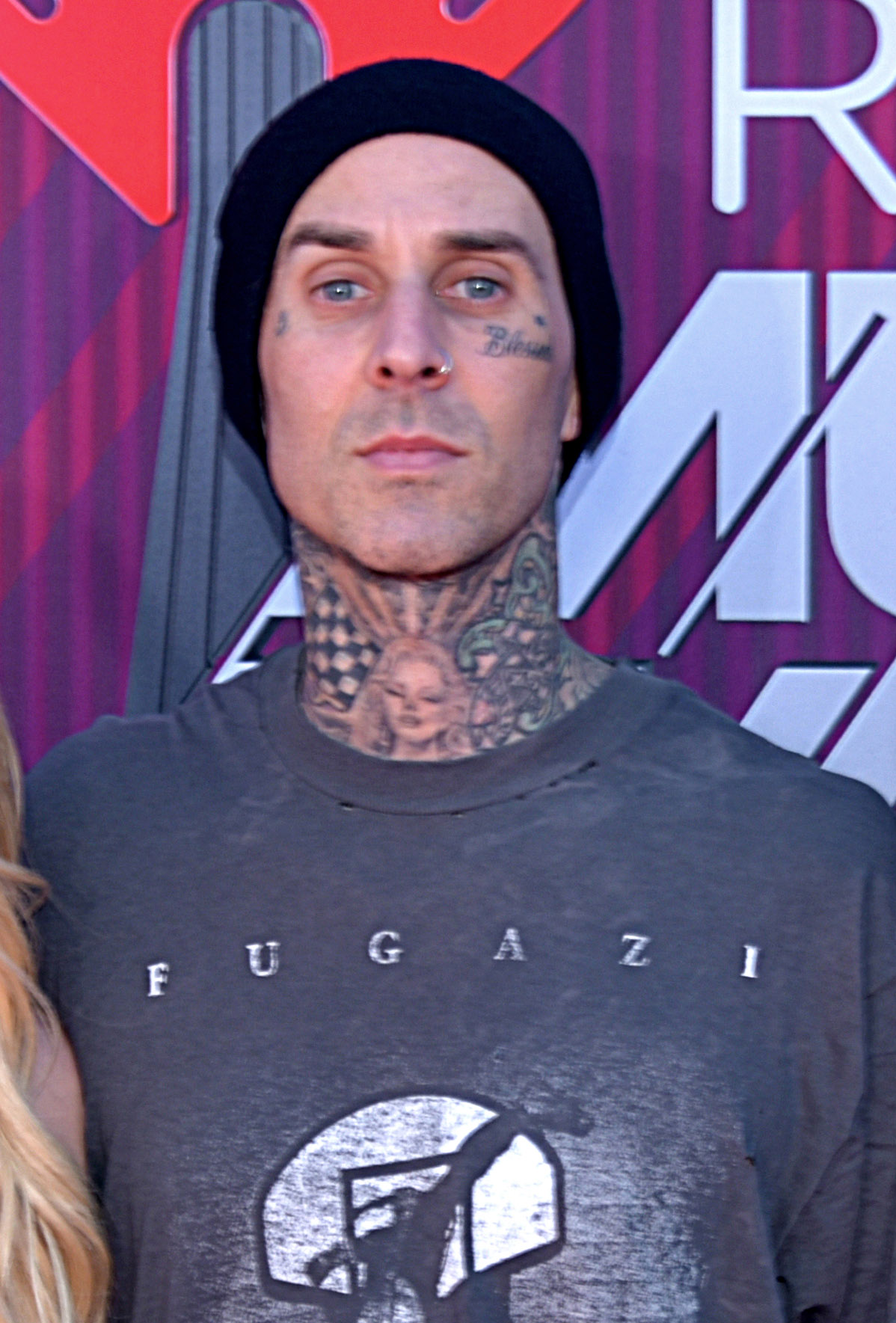
Drummer Travis Barker produced One More Time...

Many critics and fans took issue with the album’s production, particularly its extensive pitch correction, brickwalled mastering, and prominently mixed drums. Barker directly responded to the claims, countering that he himself did not mix the album. After a commenter suggested the band take inspiration from late producer Jerry Finn, whose work on the band's classic-era albums involved painstaking attention to drum tones, Barker replied that Finn's exacting methods were exhausting, writing: "It was three days of drum sounds and six hours of drum recording!"

A recurring criticism centered on the album’s overpowering drum mix, which some listeners felt overwhelmed other instrumentation. Engineer Aaron Rubin later indicated in a podcast interview that the album's digital versions had quietly received an updated mix shortly after release. Some listeners also speculated that the drums sounded programmed or heavily sampled (rather than actual live drums). In reality, most of the drums were tracked on a stainless steel DW kit. Barker extensively used cloth dampeners, commonly known as "quesadillas," to achieve what he described in a Reverb.com interview as a "dry and quick" drum sound with minimal overtones. Although drum samples were often layered beneath the live recordings, Barker stated that he preferred to rely primarily on the natural sound of the snare drum.

Several reviewers argued that the album’s polished and aggressive production diminished its emotional impact. Jon Caramanica of The New York Times described the sound as "familiar but uncanny" and "Botoxed tight." Pitchfork critic Arielle Gordon bemoaned Barker's "overstuffed, cheap-thrills approach to production," particularly criticizing the density of his drum fills. Writing for Stereogum, Pranav Trewn commented that "at times the gloss is turned up too high, drawing attention to the industry machinery behind the curtain."

== Touring ==
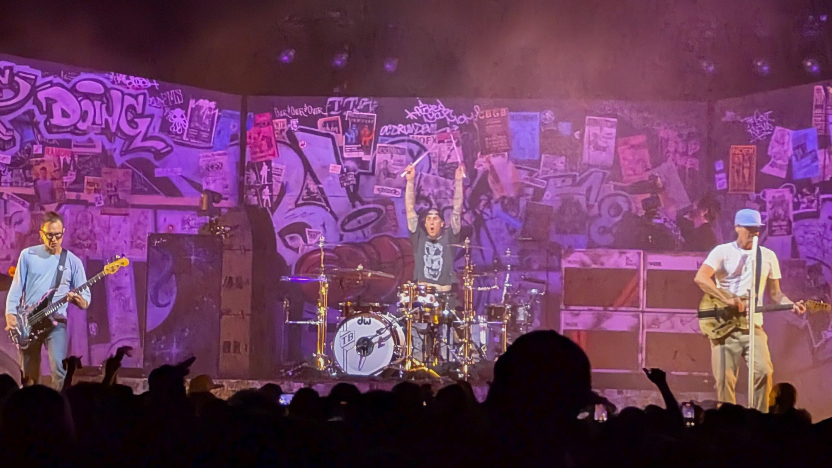
Blink-182 performing in 2025

To support One More Time..., Blink-182 entered an extensive three-year global touring cycle that capitalized on the publicity surrounding their reconciliation. The trio debuted their reunion at Coachella 2023, where they were subsequently elevated to headline the second weekend following the withdrawal of its original headliner. Ahead of the album's release, the band embarked on a greatest hits-oriented tour, initially promoted as the Rock Hard Tour and later simply as the World Tour. Hardcore band Turnstile served as principal supporting act, alongside the Story So Far and KennyHoopla. The tour crossed North America in mid-2023 before moving to Europe later that year. In 2024, the band returned to Australia for their first concerts there in more than a decade, followed by their long-awaited debut performances in Latin America, including appearances at Lollapalooza across the continent.

A dedicated album-supporting trek, the One More Time Tour, began in mid-2024 and included the first stadium concerts of Blink-182's career. It also marked the band's first use of an in-the-round configuration; its circular stage was modeled after the band's signature smiley-face logo. The set list was notable for incorporating songs from the members' side projects for the first time, including material by +44 and Box Car Racer, while Pierce the Veil served as the primary supporting act. The World Tour and One More Time Tour became the band's most commercially successful touring period. Billboard ranked the group among the ten highest-grossing rock touring acts in both 2023 and 2024, with the band grossing approximately $85 million in 2023 and more than $118 million in 2024. The strong attendance was attributed in part to nostalgia surrounding the reunion and the opportunity to see DeLonge perform with the band for the first time in a decade.

Blink-182 concluded the One More Time... touring cycle with the Missionary Impossible Tour, a 24-date North American run in 2025 with Alkaline Trio, whose guitarist Matt Skiba had replaced DeLonge during his absence from the band. Since returning, DeLonge had occasionally performed material recorded during the Skiba era, most notably the 2016 single "Bored to Death"; Skiba joined Hoppus, Barker, and DeLonge onstage to perform the song together at Riot Fest. The Missionary Impossible Tour placed greater emphasis on fan favorites and deep cuts, reviving several songs that had not been performed live in decades while also incorporating additional material from One More Time.... The tour served as the final phase of the band's prolonged reunion and album campaign.

== Track listing ==
All tracks are written by Mark Hoppus, Tom DeLonge, and Travis Barker, with additional songwriters listed.

One More Time… track listing
No.	Title	Writer(s)	Lead vocals	Length
1.	"Anthem Part 3"	Aaron Rubin	DeLonge; Hoppus	3:33
2.	"Dance with Me"	Rubin; Nick Long; Dan Book	DeLonge; Hoppus	3:08
3.	"Fell in Love"	Long; Ryan Tedder; Robert Smith	DeLonge; Hoppus	2:18
4.	"Terrified"	Long	DeLonge	2:48
5.	"One More Time"	Andrew Goldstein; Gregory Hein	DeLonge; Hoppus; Barker	3:28
6.	"More Than You Know"	Rubin; Book	Hoppus; DeLonge	3:37
7.	"Turn This Off!"	Brian Lee	DeLonge; Hoppus	0:24
8.	"When We Were Young"	Rubin; Lee	DeLonge; Hoppus	2:41
9.	"Edging"	Long; Book	DeLonge; Hoppus	2:29
10.	"You Don't Know What You've Got"	Long; Michael Pollack	Hoppus; DeLonge	3:19
11.	"Blink Wave"	Rubin	Hoppus; DeLonge	3:08
12.	"Bad News"	Long	Hoppus	2:20
13.	"Hurt (Interlude)"		DeLonge	1:22
14.	"Turpentine"	Rubin; Book	DeLonge; Hoppus	3:05
15.	"Fuck Face"	Tim Armstrong	Barker; DeLonge	0:27
16.	"Other Side"	Book	Hoppus	2:10
17.	"Childhood"	Rubin; Lee	Hoppus; DeLonge	4:19
Total length:				44:38

Digital exclusive bonus tracks (Note: Inserted between "Other Side" and "Childhood", with the latter listed as track 19.)
No.	Title	Writer(s)	Lead vocals	Length
17.	"Cut Me Off"	Tedder; Goldstein; Hein	DeLonge; Hoppus	2:08
18.	"See You"	Goldstein; Hein	DeLonge; Hoppus	3:22
Total length:				50:08

One More Time... Part-2 bonus tracks
No.	Title	Writer(s)	Lead vocals	Length
20.	"No Fun"		DeLonge	3:03
21.	"All in My Head"	Rubin	Hoppus; DeLonge	2:43
22.	"Can't Go Back"	Goldstein; Hein	Hoppus; DeLonge	2:45
23.	"Every Other Weekend"	Long; Goldstein; Hein	Hoppus; DeLonge	2:45
24.	"Everyone Everywhere"		Hoppus; DeLonge	3:03
25.	"If You Never Left"	Long; Tommy English	Hoppus; DeLonge	2:59
26.	"One Night Stand"	Rubin	DeLonge; Hoppus	3:35
27.	"Take Me In"	Lee; Long; Nathan Perez	DeLonge; Hoppus	3:39
Total length:				74:40

Notes

- All song titles are stylized in all caps.
- "Fell in Love" contains an interpolation of "Close to Me" by the Cure.
- "Fuck Face" is censored as "F*ck Face" on clean versions of the album, or is given the alternative title "You Talk Too Much (Shut Up) (Interlude)".

== Personnel ==
Credits adapted from One More Time... and One More Time... Part-2 liner notes.

Blink-182

- Mark Hoppus – vocals, bass, bass engineering (4)
- Tom DeLonge – vocals, guitars
- Travis Barker – drums, vocals (5, 15), backing vocals (3), handclaps (14), production

Additional personnel

- Kevin Bivona – synthesizers (2–4, 6, 8–11, 13–14, 16–17), piano (2, 4–6, 8, 10–14, 16), organ (1, 9, 16), strings (5), backing vocals (10), recording (1–8, 10–17, 21, 22, 24, 27)
- Kevin "Thrasher" Gruft – recording, handclaps (14)

Technical personnel

- Aaron Rubin – co-producer (1–2, 4, 8, 11, 14, 24, 26), recording (1–17, 20–27)
- Nick Long – co-producer (2–4, 10, 12, 23, 25)
- Ryan Tedder – co-producer (3, 18)
- Andrew Goldstein – co-producer (5, 18–19, 22, 23)
- Brian Lee – co-producer (7, 8, 17, 27)
- Tim Armstrong – co-producer (15)
- Gregory Hein – co-producer (18–19, 22, 23)
- Thomas English – co-producer (25)
- Nicholas Morzov – recording
- Eric Emery – recording (1–8, 10–17)
- John Warren – recording (1–8, 10–17)
- Adam Hawkins – mixing (1–2, 4, 6–7, 12, 14, 16)
- Henry Lunetta – mixing assistance (1–2, 4, 6–7, 12, 14, 16)
- Mark "Spike" Stent – mixing (3, 5, 8, 10–11, 13, 15, 17–27)
- Matt Wolach – mixing assistance (3, 5, 8, 10–11, 13, 15, 17, 18)
- Serban Ghenea – mixing (9)
- Bryce Bordone – mixing assistance (9)
- Dan Book – bass engineering (9)
- Randy Merrill – mastering

Artwork

- Clemente Ruiz – photography
- Daniel Rojas – photography
- Eric Haze – logos
- Jack Bridgland – photography
- Lake Hills – layout
- Skye Hoppus – photography

Locations

- Recorded at The Waiting Room (Los Angeles, California), Jupiter Sound (San Diego, California) (1–8, 10–17), Area 69 Studios (San Diego, California) (9), Califa Studios (Los Angeles, California) (9)
- Mixed at Periscope Sound (Franklin, Tennessee) (1, 2, 4, 6, 7, 14, 16, 19), SLS Studios (London, United Kingdom) (3, 8, 10, 11, 15, 17, 18) and Mixstar Studios (Virginia Beach, Virginia) (9)
- Mastered at Sterling Sound (Edgewater, New Jersey)

== Charts ==
=== Weekly charts ===
Weekly chart performance for One More Time...
Chart (2023–24)	Peak position
Australian Albums (ARIA)	2
Austrian Albums (Ö3 Austria)	2
Belgian Albums (Ultratop Flanders)	3
Belgian Albums (Ultratop Wallonia)	5
Canadian Albums (Billboard)	2
Czech Albums (ČNS IFPI)	15
Dutch Albums (Album Top 100)	6
Finnish Albums (Suomen virallinen lista)	23
French Albums (SNEP)	10
German Albums (Offizielle Top 100)	2
Greek Albums (IFPI)	70
Hungarian Albums (MAHASZ)	31
Irish Albums (Official Charts)	3
Italian Albums (FIMI)	3
Japanese Albums (Oricon)	38
Japanese Digital Albums (Oricon)	11
Japanese Hot Albums (Billboard Japan)	37
New Zealand Albums (RMNZ)	5
Norwegian Albums (VG-lista)	31
Polish Albums (ZPAV)	51
Portuguese Albums (AFP)	3
Scottish Albums (Official Charts)	3
Slovak Albums (ČNS IFPI)	36
Spanish Albums (Promusicae)	16
Swedish Albums (Sverigetopplistan)	43
Swiss Albums (Schweizer Hitparade)	2
UK Albums (Official Charts)	2
UK Rock & Metal Albums (Official Charts)	1
US Billboard 200	1
US Digital Albums (Billboard)	1
US Indie Store Album Sales (Billboard)	2
US Top Album Sales (Billboard)	1
US Top Alternative Albums (Billboard)	1
US Top Rock Albums (Billboard)	1

=== Year-end charts ===
Year-end chart performance for One More Time...
Chart (2023)	Position
UK Vinyl Albums (OCC)	34

Chart (2024)	Position
US Top Album Sales (Billboard)	45
US Top Current Album Sales (Billboard)	38
US Top Rock Albums (Billboard)	58

== Certifications ==
Certifications for One More Time...
Region	Certification	Certified units/sales
Canada (Music Canada)	Gold	40,000^{‡}
United Kingdom (BPI)	Silver	60,000^{‡}
^{‡} Sales+streaming figures based on certification alone.
