= Anthem Part 3 =

Song by Blink-182

from the album One More Time...
- Released: October 20, 2023
- Genre: Punk rock
- Length: 3:33
- Label: Columbia
- Songwriters: Mark Hoppus; Tom DeLonge; Travis Barker; Aaron Rubin
- Producer: Travis Barker

"Anthem Part 3" is a song by the American punk rock band Blink-182 from their 2023 album One More Time.... It is the third part in their "Anthem" series, with the first part in the series being released on their 1999 album Enema of the State, and the second part, "Anthem Part Two", being released on their 2001 album, Take Off Your Pants and Jacket. The song was written by all three members of the band alongside co-producer and recording engineer, Aaron Rubin. Despite not being released as a single, the song saw a significant amount of commercial success, and was promoted heavily during the band's support for the album.

== Release and reception ==
"Anthem Part 3" was first teased by the band in December 2022, when drummer Travis Barker posted a clip of him in the studio playing the song. The song has been praised by numerous critics as one of the best on the album. Rolling Stone praised the song for scratching the "nostalgic itch", while Kerrang! heavily praised the instrumentation of all three band members.

While never released as a single, "Anthem Part 3" proved to be one of the more successful songs from One More Time.... The song charted favorably in both the US and UK, which included peaking at number 12 on the US Bubbling Under Hot 100 chart. The song also appeared on hot songs charts in Canada and New Zealand.

While the song was already a regular part of their setlist for the supporting tours for One More Time..., the band began promoting it much more heavily following its surprise success. This included the release of a live music video containing footage from their World Tour 2023/2024 and a secret show at a Denny's in Long Beach, California.

== Credits and personnel ==
According to the song's YouTube video:

Blink-182

- Tom DeLonge – vocals, guitars
- Mark Hoppus – vocals, bass guitar
- Travis Barker – drums

Other musicians

- Kevin Bivona – organ

Technical

- Travis Barker – producer
- Aaron Rubin – co-producer, recording
- Nicholas Morzov – recording
- Kevin Bivona – recording
- Eric Emery – recording
- John Warren – recording
- Kevin "Thrasher" Gruft – recording
- Adam Hawkins – mixing
- Henry Lunetta – mix assistant
- Randy Merrill – mastering

== Charts ==
2023 weekly chart performance for "Anthem Part 3"
Chart (2023)	Peak position
Canada Hot 100 (Billboard)	78
New Zealand Hot Singles (RMNZ)	9
UK Singles (OCC)	48
UK Rock & Metal (OCC)	4
US Bubbling Under Hot 100 (Billboard)	12
US Hot Rock & Alternative Songs (Billboard)	22
