= World Tour 2023/2024 =

2023–2024 concert tour by Blink-182

- Tour by Blink-182
- Official poster for the tour
- Location: Europe; North America; Oceania; South America
- Start date: May 4, 2023 (Note: The band performed two dates at Coachella, April 14 and 23, 2023, prior to the start of their tour.)
- End date: November 9, 2024
- Legs: 4
- No. of shows: 91
- Supporting acts: Wallows; Turnstile; The Story So Far; Rise Against

Blink-182 concert chronology
- Blink-182 and Lil Wayne Tour (2019); World Tour 2023/2024 (2023–24); One More Time Tour (2024)

The World Tour 2023/2024, also known as the Rock Hard Tour, was a concert tour by American rock band Blink-182. The tour began on May 4, 2023, at Xcel Energy Center in St. Paul, Minnesota and ended on November 9, 2024 in Mexico City, Mexico. The tour marked Blink-182's 30th anniversary and their first run with original member Tom DeLonge in nearly a decade, as well as their first-ever performances in Latin America, including a long-awaited return to Mexico after nearly two decades. The band also made surprise appearances at Coachella in 2023, including a last-minute headline set. The tour was first announced on October 11, 2022.

Initially launched and billed as a "reunion tour", the band's ninth studio album One More Time... was released shortly before the end of the first North American and European legs. Commercially, the tour was a major success, becoming the band’s highest-grossing outing to date, with hundreds of thousands of tickets sold and strong attendance driven by nostalgia-fueled demand from an older fanbase. Critics were largely positive, praising the band's chemistry, energetic performances, and strong musicianship, while noting their effective stage production and renewed sense of cohesion.

== Background ==
The tour marks the band's thirtieth anniversary, and their first tour with original singer and guitarist Tom DeLonge since 2014. It also marks their first-ever shows in Latin America. The band has not played Mexico in any capacity since 2004. Previous efforts to tour worldwide were complicated by drummer Travis Barker's flight anxiety following his 2008 plane crash. Barker flew for the first time since that incident in 2021, enabling the band to set dates across the globe. On March 1, 2023, DeLonge announced on his Instagram that the Latin American dates would be postponed until 2024 due to Barker sustaining a finger injury that required surgery and rest.

Prior to the start of their tour, the band made a surprise appearance at Coachella on April 14, 2023, marking DeLonge's first appearance with the band in nine years. The band then served as a replacement headliner of the festival's second weekend on April 23 after singer Frank Ocean was forced to back out at the last minute. The tour is variously referred to as the Rock Hard Tour in some promotional materials.

As part of the setlist, DeLonge performed two songs recorded during vocalist/guitarist Matt Skiba's time in the band: "Bored to Death" and "Cynical" from California (2016).

== Reception ==
=== Boxscore ===
Preceding the tour, Billboard estimated that the tour will earn around $150 million across its four legs. At the conclusion of its inaugural North American leg, the publication estimated that it had thus far generated $85.3 million and sold 564,000 tickets, making it the band's biggest outing yet. It surpassed the trio's previous highest-grossing trek, the 2009 In Concert Tour ($22.5 million), by four and a half times. The tour also set slight highs in terms of attendance, with an average of 15,664 per show. Analysts for Billboard determined that higher ticket prices due to the cost of touring and inflation, as well as controversial policies like dynamic pricing, led to the dramatic increase in gross. The highest-grossing individual show was two nights at BMO Stadium in Los Angeles, where the trio grossed $8.8 million and sold 43,600 tickets. Later, the magazine ranked it among the Top 10 Highest-Grossing Rock Tours of 2023, reporting that each show from its first two legs were fully sold-out.

Analysts suggested that the momentum generated by the tour was due to its primary demographic being older and having more disposable income, as well general nostalgia, particularly during an early 2020s mall-punk revival. "Not only is its target demo older (and hopefully wiser and richer), but the band is returning in a more welcoming environment," wrote Eric Frankenberg from Billboard. Bloomberg's Ashley Carman suggested that "the mantle of rock arena stardom is finally being passed on to them from the prior generation of aging rockers."

=== Critical reviews ===
The tour has received positive responses from music and entertainment critics. Selena Fragassi at the Chicago Sun-Times praised the band's "innate chemistry" and the fury of Barker's antics, and William Earl at Variety concurred: "The best fireworks were the interplay between the band members. They bounded around the stage, feeling — and acting — like kids again." Chris Riemenschneider of the Star Tribune acclaimed the musicianship: "Blink really [has] its act together, nostalgia act or not." Pittsburgh Post-Gazette reviewer Scott Mervis called their performance "triumphant" and praised their set design: "Throwing a middle finger to the typical arena rock setup, Blink arrived on a diamond-shaped stage that was about half the width of the floor. Of course, there's only three of them, and the togetherness, under the circumstances, is a good move." The Seattle Times's Michael Rietmulder observed the band "powering through one pop-punk burner after another, a virtually sold-out Climate Pledge Arena crowd hanging on every cymbal crash and speedball harmony."

Across the globe, reviews remained positive, though some took issue with the band's humor. After their shows in the U.K., the Guardian's Matt Mills opined: "the stage was set for this show to acknowledge the burdens the band have beaten and celebrate the men they've become – that they instead focus far more on trying to be the kids they once were robs the evening of so much emotional potential." In Sydney, reviewer James Jennings of the Sydney Morning Herald complimented the jokes, and called Barker "surely one of the best rock drummers on the planet."

== Set list ==
This set list is from the concert on May 4, 2023 in St. Paul, Minnesota. It is not intended to represent all shows from the tour.

1. "Anthem Part Two"
2. "The Rock Show"
3. "Family Reunion"
4. "Man Overboard"
5. "Feeling This"
6. "Reckless Abandon"
7. "Dysentery Gary"
8. "Up All Night"
9. "Dumpweed"
10. "Edging"
11. "Aliens Exist"
12. "Cynical"
13. "Don't Leave Me" / "Not Now" / "Violence"
14. "Happy Holidays, You Bastard"
15. "Stay Together for the Kids"
16. "Always"
17. "Down"
18. "Bored to Death"
19. "I Miss You"
20. "Adam's Song"
21. "Ghost on the Dance Floor"
22. "What's My Age Again?"
23. "First Date"
24. "All the Small Things"
25. "Dammit"

== Tour dates ==
List of 2023 concerts
Date	City	Country	Venue	Opening acts
April 14, 2023 (Note: These concerts were a part of Coachella.)	Indio	United States	Empire Polo Club	—N/a
April 23, 2023	Indio	United States	Empire Polo Club	—N/a
May 4, 2023	Saint Paul	United States	Xcel Energy Center	Turnstile; Beauty School Dropout
May 6, 2023	Chicago	United States	United Center	Turnstile; Beauty School Dropout
May 7, 2023	Chicago	United States	United Center	Turnstile; Beauty School Dropout
May 9, 2023	Detroit	United States	Little Caesars Arena	Turnstile; Beauty School Dropout
May 11, 2023	Toronto	Canada	Scotiabank Arena	Turnstile; Beauty School Dropout
May 12, 2023	Montreal	Canada	Bell Centre	Turnstile; Beauty School Dropout
May 15, 2023	Toronto	Canada	Scotiabank Arena	Beauty School Dropout; Nobro
May 16, 2023	Cleveland	United States	Rocket Mortgage FieldHouse	Turnstile; Beauty School Dropout
May 17, 2023	Pittsburgh	United States	PPG Paints Arena	Turnstile; Beauty School Dropout
May 19, 2023	New York City	United States	Madison Square Garden	Turnstile; Beauty School Dropout
May 20, 2023	Elmont	United States	UBS Arena	Turnstile; Beauty School Dropout
May 21, 2023	Boston	United States	TD Garden	Turnstile; White Reaper
May 23, 2023	Washington, D.C.	United States	Capital One Arena	Turnstile; White Reaper
May 24, 2023	Brooklyn	United States	Barclays Center	Turnstile; White Reaper
May 26, 2023	Baltimore	United States	CFG Bank Arena	Turnstile; White Reaper
May 27, 2023	Hershey	United States	Hersheypark Stadium	Turnstile; White Reaper
May 28, 2023 (Note: This concert was a part of Adjacent Festival.)	Atlantic City	United States	Atlantic City Beach	—N/a
June 14, 2023	Phoenix	United States	Footprint Center	Turnstile; Landon Barker
June 16, 2023	Los Angeles	United States	BMO Stadium	Turnstile; Destroy Boys
June 17, 2023	Los Angeles	United States	BMO Stadium	Turnstile; Landon Barker
June 19, 2023	San Diego	United States	Pechanga Arena	Turnstile; Destroy Boys
June 20, 2023	San Diego	United States	Pechanga Arena	Turnstile; Landon Barker
June 22, 2023	San Jose	United States	SAP Center	Turnstile; Destroy Boys
June 23, 2023	Sacramento	United States	Golden 1 Center	Turnstile; Destroy Boys
June 25, 2023	Seattle	United States	Climate Pledge Arena	Turnstile; Destroy Boys
June 27, 2023	Vancouver	Canada	Rogers Arena	Turnstile; Destroy Boys
June 29, 2023	Edmonton	Canada	Rogers Place	Turnstile; Destroy Boys
June 30, 2023	Calgary	Canada	Scotiabank Saddledome	Turnstile; Destroy Boys
July 3, 2023	Denver	United States	Ball Arena	Turnstile; Destroy Boys
July 5, 2023	Dallas	United States	American Airlines Center	Turnstile; Destroy Boys
July 7, 2023	Austin	United States	Moody Center	Turnstile; Destroy Boys
July 8, 2023	Houston	United States	Toyota Center	Turnstile; KennyHoopla
July 10, 2023	Tampa	United States	Amalie Arena	Turnstile; KennyHoopla
July 11, 2023	Sunrise	United States	FLA Live Arena	Turnstile; KennyHoopla
July 13, 2023	Atlanta	United States	State Farm Arena	Turnstile; KennyHoopla
July 14, 2023	Charlotte	United States	Spectrum Center	Turnstile; Landon Barker
July 16, 2023	Nashville	United States	Bridgestone Arena	Turnstile; KennyHoopla
September 8, 2023	Antwerp	Belgium	Sportpaleis	The Story So Far
September 9, 2023	Cologne	Germany	Lanxess Arena	The Story So Far
September 12, 2023	Copenhagen	Denmark	Royal Arena	The Story So Far
September 13, 2023	Stockholm	Sweden	Avicii Arena	The Story So Far
September 14, 2023	Oslo	Norway	Oslo Spektrum	The Story So Far
September 16, 2023	Berlin	Germany	Mercedes-Benz Arena	The Story So Far
September 17, 2023	Hamburg	Germany	Barclays Arena	The Story So Far
September 19, 2023	Prague	Czech Republic	O2 Arena	The Story So Far
September 20, 2023	Vienna	Austria	Wiener Stadthalle	The Story So Far
October 2, 2023	Lisbon	Portugal	Altice Arena	The Story So Far
October 3, 2023	Madrid	Spain	WiZink Center	The Story So Far
October 4, 2023	Barcelona	Spain	Palau Sant Jordi	The Story So Far
October 6, 2023	Bologna	Italy	Unipol Arena	The Story So Far
October 8, 2023	Amsterdam	Netherlands	Ziggo Dome	The Story So Far
October 9, 2023	Paris	France	Accor Arena	The Story So Far
October 11, 2023	London	England	The O_{2} Arena	The Story So Far
October 12, 2023	London	England	The O_{2} Arena	The Story So Far
October 14, 2023	Birmingham	England	Utilita Arena	The Story So Far
October 15, 2023	Manchester	England	AO Arena	The Story So Far
October 16, 2023	Manchester	England	AO Arena	The Story So Far
October 21, 2023 (Note: These concerts were a part of When We Were Young.)	Winchester (Note: Promoted as Las Vegas.)	United States	Las Vegas Fairgrounds	—N/a
October 22, 2023	Winchester	United States	Las Vegas Fairgrounds	—N/a

List of 2024 concerts
Date	City	Country	Venue	Opening acts
February 8, 2024	Perth	Australia	RAC Arena	Rise Against
February 9, 2024	Perth	Australia	RAC Arena	Rise Against
February 11, 2024	Adelaide	Australia	Adelaide Entertainment Centre	Rise Against
February 13, 2024	Melbourne	Australia	Rod Laver Arena	Rise Against
February 14, 2024	Melbourne	Australia	Rod Laver Arena	Rise Against
February 16, 2024	Sydney	Australia	Qudos Bank Arena	Rise Against
February 17, 2024	Sydney	Australia	Qudos Bank Arena	Rise Against
February 19, 2024	Brisbane	Australia	Brisbane Entertainment Centre	Rise Against
February 20, 2024	Brisbane	Australia	Brisbane Entertainment Centre	Rise Against
February 21, 2024	Brisbane	Australia	Brisbane Entertainment Centre	Rise Against
February 23, 2024	Sydney	Australia	Qudos Bank Arena	Rise Against
February 24, 2024	Sydney	Australia	Qudos Bank Arena	Rise Against
February 26, 2024	Melbourne	Australia	Rod Laver Arena	Rise Against
February 27, 2024	Melbourne	Australia	Rod Laver Arena	Rise Against
February 29, 2024	Melbourne	Australia	Rod Laver Arena	Rise Against
March 2, 2024	Auckland	New Zealand	Spark Arena	Rise Against
March 12, 2024	Lima	Peru	Estadio Universidad San Marcos	The Offspring; 6 Voltios
March 15, 2024 (Note: This concert was part of Lollapalooza Argentina.)	Buenos Aires	Argentina	Hipódromo de San Isidro	—N/a
March 16, 2024 (Note: This concert was part of Lollapalooza Chile.)	Santiago	Chile	Parque Cerrillos	—N/a
March 19, 2024 (Note: This concert was part of Asunciónico.)	Luque	Paraguay	Parque Olímpico	—N/a
March 22, 2024 (Note: This concert was part of Lollapalooza Brasil.)	São Paulo	Brazil	Interlagos Circuit	—N/a
March 24, 2024 (Note: This concert was part of Festival Estéreo Picnic.)	Bogotá	Colombia	Simón Bolívar Park	—N/a
March 30, 2024 (Note: This concert was part of Pal Norte Festival.)	Monterrey	Mexico	Fundidora Park	—N/a
April 2, 2024	Mexico City	Mexico	Palacio de los Deportes	Petey
August 23, 2024 (Note: This concert is part of the Reading Festival.)	Reading	England	Little John's Farm	—N/a
August 24, 2024 (Note: This concert is part of the Leeds Festival.)	Leeds	England	Bramham Park	—N/a
August 26, 2024 (Note: This concert was originally scheduled on September 4, 2023, but was postponed due to an "urgent family matter" involving Barker.)	Belfast	Northern Ireland	SSE Arena	The Story So Far
August 27, 2024 (Note: This concert was originally scheduled to be held at 3Arena on September 5, 2023, but was postponed due to an "urgent family matter" involving Barker.)	Dublin	Ireland	Royal Hospital Kilmainham	The Story So Far
August 29, 2024 (Note: These concerts were originally scheduled on September 1 and 2, 2023, respectively, but were postponed due to an "urgent family matter" involving Barker.)	Glasgow	Scotland	OVO Hydro	The Story So Far
August 30, 2024	Glasgow	Scotland	OVO Hydro	The Story So Far
November 9, 2024	Mexico City	Mexico	Estadio GNP Seguros	Pierce The Veil; Petey; Allison

=== Cancelled dates ===
List of cancelled concerts
Date	City	Country	Venue	Reason
March 11, 2023 (Note: This concert was to be part of the Imperial GNP Festival.)	Tijuana	Mexico	Morelos Park	Originally postponed; festival was later canceled
March 4, 2024	Christchurch	New Zealand	Christchurch Arena	Unexpected logistical issues
April 3, 2024	Mexico City	Mexico	Palacio de los Deportes	Mark Hoppus illness
April 5, 2024	Mexico City	Mexico	Palacio de los Deportes	Mark Hoppus illness
April 6, 2024	Mexico City	Mexico	Palacio de los Deportes	Mark Hoppus illness
