= Fell in Love =

Single by Blink-182

from the album One More Time...
- Released: October 13, 2023
- Recorded: 2023
- Genre: Pop-punk; alternative pop
- Length: 2:18
- Label: Columbia
- Songwriters: Mark Hoppus; Tom DeLonge; Travis Barker; Aaron Rubin; Nick Long; Robert Smith; Ryan Tedder
- Producer: Travis Barker

Blink-182 singles chronology
"Dance with Me" (2023)	"Fell in Love" (2023)	"You Don't Know What You've Got" (2023)

"Fell in Love" is a song recorded by American rock band Blink-182. The song was released on October 13, 2023, through Columbia Records as the fifth single from their ninth album One More Time.... It was written by bassist Mark Hoppus, guitarist Tom DeLonge, and drummer Travis Barker, alongside engineer Aaron Rubin and songwriters Ryan Tedder and Nick Long.

== Background ==
A pop-punk song, DeLonge sings of the early, halcyon days of meeting a significant other: "I don’t miss the days before I fell for you." In the song's chorus, DeLonge recalls their initial drunken meeting at a party. The mid-tempo tune opens with a synthesizer riff, played by engineer Kevin Bivona, that interpolates the Cure's 1985 single "Close to Me", earning its frontman Robert Smith a songwriting credit.

== Reception ==
Jon Blistein of Rolling Stone stated that "'Fell in Love' is a bit of jangly alterna-pop, the bright guitars paired with some effervescent synths. Tom DeLonge and Mark Hoppus share vocal duties, reminiscing about those exciting, slightly stupid moments in an early relationship." Tom Breihan of Stereogum, praised the song's sincerity and catchy quality, while observing DeLonge's famously "strange and singular accent."

== Personnel ==
Credits adapted from the song's YouTube video.

Blink-182

- Tom DeLonge – vocals, guitar, songwriting
- Mark Hoppus – vocals, bass guitar, songwriting
- Travis Barker – drums, backing vocals, songwriting

Additional musician

- Kevin Bivona – synthesizer

Production

- Travis Barker – producer
- Nick Long – co-producer, songwriting
- Ryan Tedder – co-producer, songwriting
- Robert Smith – songwriting
- Nicholas Morzov – recording
- Kevin Bivona – recording
- Eric Emery – recording
- John Warren – recording
- Kevin "Thrasher" Gruft – recording
- Aaron Rubin – recording, songwriting
- Mark "Spike" Stent – mixing
- Matt Wolach – mix assistant
- Randy Merrill – mastering

== Charts ==
Chart performance for "Fell in Love"
Chart (2023)	Peak position
Australia Digital Tracks (ARIA)	49
Czech Republic Rock (IFPI)	4
Italy Airplay (FIMI)	33
New Zealand Hot Singles (RMNZ)	35
San Marino (SMRRTV Top 50)	31
UK Singles Sales (OCC)	78
UK Singles Downloads (OCC)	73
US Hot Rock & Alternative Songs (Billboard)	34
