= You Don't Know What You've Got (Blink-182 song) =

Single by Blink-182

from the album One More Time...
- Released: October 18, 2023
- Recorded: 2023
- Length: 3:19
- Label: Columbia
- Songwriters: Mark Hoppus; Tom DeLonge; Travis Barker; Nick Long; Michael Pollack
- Producer: Travis Barker

Blink-182 singles chronology
| "Fell in Love" (2023) | "You Don't Know What You've Got" (2023) | "All in My Head" / "No Fun" (2024) |

"You Don't Know What You've Got" is a song recorded by American rock band Blink-182. The song was released on October 18, 2023, through Columbia Records as the sixth single from their ninth album One More Time.... It was written by bassist Mark Hoppus, guitarist Tom DeLonge, and drummer Travis Barker, alongside additional songwriters Michael Pollack and Nick Long. The song is a power ballad that explores themes of mortality, gratitude, and loss. Musically, it blends the band's signature pop-punk sound with subdued, introspective verses that build into an explosive, anthemic chorus.

The song was inspired by Hoppus's 2021 battle with lymphoma, as well as his recovery from chemotherapy. "You Don't Know What You've Got" received mixed reviews from music critics. Reviewers praised its emotional subject matter and dynamic arrangement, while others criticized it as overly reminiscent of the band's earlier work.

== Background ==
At the beginning of the 2020s, blink-182 bassist Mark Hoppus was preparing to write and record new music while continuing the band's career. After the COVID-19 pandemic halted touring plans, Hoppus—who had long struggled with depression—began attending therapy. In June 2021, after seeking medical attention for a lump on his shoulder, he was diagnosed with stage IV diffuse large B-cell lymphoma. He underwent months of intensive chemotherapy, losing his hair and experiencing severe physical side effects before announcing later that year that he was cancer-free. Although he entered remission, Hoppus later said the experience left him profoundly changed, an ordeal he explored further in his 2025 memoir, Fahrenheit-182.

Hoppus's illness also played a role in reuniting blink-182's classic lineup. Following his diagnosis, guitarist Tom DeLonge reconciled with Hoppus and drummer Travis Barker after years of estrangement, leading to the trio's reunion and the recording of One More Time... (2023). During the album's writing sessions, the band developed "You Don't Know What You've Got" as a reflection on Hoppus's cancer battle, exploring the physical and emotional toll of his illness and its impact on his family. Recording the song proved difficult because Hoppus was still recovering from chemotherapy. The treatment had damaged his vocal cords, requiring him to work with a vocal coach before he could sing again, while persistent "brain fog" forced him to relearn aspects of his bass playing.

== Composition ==
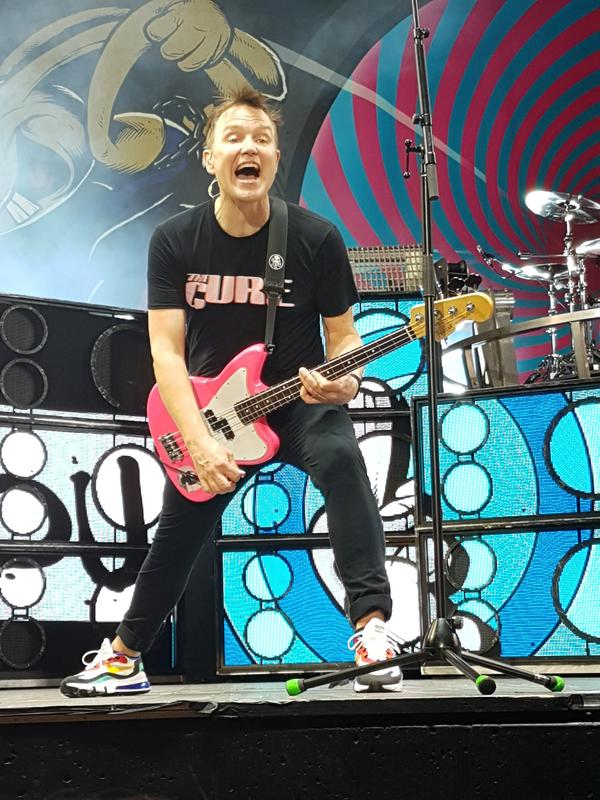
The song was inspired by bassist Mark Hoppus and his battle with cancer.

The song's lyrics explore themes of gratitude, loss, and mortality, focusing on the realization that people often take their lives and loved ones for granted until it is too late. Lyrically, "You Don't Know What You've Got" reflects on Hoppus's experience with cancer, contrasting the uncertainty of illness with the realization that people often fail to appreciate life fully. The lyrics reference "long weeks of impending doom / Stuck in life's waiting room," while the chorus repeats the refrain, "You don't know what you've got 'til it's almost gone." Its bridge, in which the narrator sings, "I begged for your forgiveness," reflects on regret and reconciliation in the face of death.

Musically, "You Don't Know What You've Got" is a power ballad that builds from subdued, Mark Hoppus-led verses into an anthemic chorus shared by Hoppus and Tom DeLonge. Andrew Sacher of BrooklynVegan compared its structure to earlier blink-182 songs "Adam's Song" and "Stay Together for the Kids". Writing for Stereogum, Chris DeVille noted that the song's central refrain recalls the theme popularized by Joni Mitchell in "Big Yellow Taxi": that people often do not appreciate what they have until it is gone.

== Reception ==
"You Don't Know What You've Got" received mixed reviews. Critics praised its emotional lyrics, explosive chorus, and Barker's intricate drumming, while detractors argued that its structure and melodies relied too heavily on earlier blink-182 songs, particularly "Adam's Song."

Maya Georgi at Rolling Stone praised the song's "explosive bridge" and subject matter. Pranav Trewn from Stereogum commended the "tumbling tin [drum] pattern" intro, commenting: "Barker's technical onslaught, which can sometimes feel like a party trick seeking a purpose, coheres into rich rhythmic tapestries on [the song]." Andrew Sacher of BrooklynVegan stated that the song has "got those classic clean Blink guitar arpeggios and somber Mark vocals in the verses, and an explosive Tom & Mark-sung chorus."

Others bemoaned the song's perceived unoriginality. Pitchfork writer Arielle Gordon felt the song "strips the haunting guitar riff from "Adam's Song" for parts, just different enough that you might miss it at first." Slant Magazine's Fred Barrett agreed, calling the "trite and repetitive" song a "flavorless approximation of the sticky hook that the band has been churning out since the late '90s." Bobby Olivier from Spin, while viewing its theme sober, admitted its melodies felt too similar to past hits by the band.

== Personnel ==
Credits adapted from the CD booklet.

Blink-182

- Mark Hoppus – vocals, bass guitar, songwriting
- Tom DeLonge – vocals, guitars, songwriting
- Travis Barker – drums, producer, songwriting

Other musicians

- Kevin Bivona – piano, synthesizer, backing vocals

Production

- Travis Barker – producer
- Nick Long – co-producer, songwriting
- Michael Pollack – songwriting
- Nicholas Morzov – recording
- Kevin Bivona – recording
- Eric Emery – recording
- John Warren – recording
- Kevin "Thrasher" Gruft – recording
- Aaron Rubin – recording
- Mark "Spike" Stent – mixing
- Matt Wolach – mix assistant
- Randy Merrill – mastering

== In popular culture ==
- The song was featured in the 2023 rhythm game Fortnite Festival, alongside the band's hit singles "All the Small Things" and "What's My Age Again?".

== Charts ==
Chart performance for "You Don't Know What You've Got"
| Chart (2023) | Peak position |
|---|---|
| US Hot Rock & Alternative Songs (Billboard) | 49 |
