= Alltel Pavilion =

Alltel Pavilion may refer to:

- Alltel Pavilion (Raleigh, North Carolina), former name of an amphitheatre in Raleigh, North Carolina
- Alltel Pavilion at the Siegel Center, a multi-purpose facility on the campus of Virginia Commonwealth University in Richmond, Virginia
