= Edge of Forever Tour =

1999–2002 concert tour by Lynyrd Skynyrd

- Tour by Lynyrd Skynyrd
- Associated album: Edge of Forever
- Start date: August 29, 1999
- End date: October 19, 2002
- No. of shows: 21

Lynyrd Skynyrd concert chronology
- Lynyrd Skynyrd Twenty Tour (1997–98); Edge of Forever Tour Tour (1999–2002); Vicious Cycle Tour (2002–08)

The Edge of Forever Tour was a concert tour by Lynyrd Skynyrd in support of their album, Edge of Forever. The band performed shows with a number of other artists including Ted Nugent and Deep Purple.

== Typical setlist ==
- "Workin' for MCA"
- "That Smell"
- "Travelin' Man"
- "You Got That Right"
- "Gimme Back My Bullets"
- "Swamp Music"
- "Call Me the Breeze"
- "Sweet Home Alabama"
- "Free Bird"

== Tour dates ==
Date	City	Country	Venue
August 29, 1999	Santa Fe	United States	Camel Rock Casino
September 1, 1999	Lancaster	United States	Antelope Valley Fairgrounds
September 6, 1999	Eureka	United States	Redwoods Acre Fairgrounds
October 16, 1999	Auburn Hills	United States	The Palace of Auburn Hills
October 24, 1999	Fargo	United States	Fargodome
October 28, 1999	Kansas City	United States	Municipal Auditorium
December 3, 1999	Oakland	United States	Oracle Arena
December 30, 1999	Austin	United States	Frank Erwin Center
January 25, 2000	Albany	United States	Times Union Center
June 20, 2000	London	England	Hammersmith Apollo
August 12, 2000	Antioch	United States	Starwood Amphitheatre
April 5, 2001	Memphis	United States	Tom Lee Park (Beale Street Music Festival 2001)
June 2, 2001	Tinley Park	United States	First Midwest Bank Amphitheatre
June 16, 2001	Mansfield	United States	Comcast Center
June 19, 2001	Toronto	Canada	Molson Canadian Amphitheatre
September 12, 2001	Raleigh	United States	Walnut Creek Amphitheater
September 20, 2001	Atlanta	United States	Aaron's Amphitheatre at Lakewood
March 8, 2002	Sunrise	United States	Sunrise Musical Theatre
March 10, 2002	Palmetto	United States	Manatee Civic Center
August 11, 2002	Albuquerque	United States	Sandia Casino
September 18, 2002	Cincinnati	United States	U.S. Bank Arena
October 19, 2002	Polk City	United States	Fantasy Of Flight

== Personnel ==
- Gary Rossington – guitar
- Johnny Van Zant – lead vocals
- Leon Wilkeson – bass (until his death on July 27, 2001)
- Ean Evans – bass (Wilkesons replacement)
- Ricky Medlocke – guitar
- Hughie Thomasson – guitar
- Billy Powell – piano
- Kenny Aronoff – drums & percussion
