= Liily =

American alternative rock band

- Origin: Los Angeles, California, U.S.
- Genres: Alternative rock, post-punk, dance-punk
- Years active: 2015–present
- Spinoff of: The Regrettes
- Members: Dylan Nash; Maxx Morando; Sam De La Torre; Charlie Anastasis
- Past members: Aaron Reeves
- Website: www.liilytheband.com

Liily is a Los Angeles–based rock band formed in 2015. Their music has been described as alternative rock, with elements of post-punk and dance-punk.

== History ==
Liily was formed in Los Angeles in 2015. Members include frontman Dylan Nash, guitarist Sam De La Torre, bassist Charlie Anastasis, and drummer Maxx Morando. The group met while attending music school. Morando was a former drummer of The Regrettes.

In 2018, Liily released their debut single "Toro" on Flush Records. In 2019, the group released their EP I Can Fool Anybody in This Town. They subsequently toured in the United States and Europe, and played at festivals such as Lollapalooza and Bonnaroo.

Liily began to work on their follow-up immediately after the release of I Can Fool Anybody in This Town. Much of the material was written in Joshua Tree National Park in January 2020. During the COVID-19 lockdowns, the bandmembers continued to work on material individually. In 2021, the album TV or Not TV was released on Flush Records. It marked a shift to a more intense, electronic influenced sound. The album was produced by Joe Chiccarelli.

In 2022, the band participated in Miley's New Year's Eve Party. The band toured with Fidlar in 2023.

== Discography ==
=== Studio albums ===
- TV or Not TV (2021)
- WAX (2026)

=== EPs ===
- I Can Fool Anybody in This Town (2019)
- Liily (2024)
