= Dan Book =

American producer and songwriter

- Born: Daniel Steven Book; July 20, 1983 (age 43); Baltimore, Maryland, United States
- Genres: Pop, rock, electronic
- Occupations: Producer, songwriter
- Instruments: Vocals; guitar; piano; drums
- Years active: 2007–present

Daniel Steven Book (born July 20, 1983) is a producer and songwriter, originally from Baltimore, Maryland. After moving to Los Angeles, he has racked up a discography with notable label artists as well as composing and producing songs for Disney Television and Films. He is currently published by and writing music for Sony/ATV Music Publishing. He is also the former lead singer of the band VooDoo Blue.

== Select discography ==
Year	Artist	Songs	Album
2026	Showing Teeth	Full Album (Executive Producer/Producer/Writer)	A Fate Worse Than Loneliness
2026	Hilary Duff	"We Don't Talk" (W)	luck...or something
2024	Neon Trees	"Secret" (W/P), "Bad Dreams" (W/P), "Favorite Daze" (P), "Recover" (W/P), "Heaven" (W/P), "Past Life" (W/P), "Paper Cuts" (W/P), "Cruel Intentions" (W/P), "Acting" (P), "Leave" (W/P), "Losing My Head" (P)	Sink Your Teeth
2024	Marcin	"Guitar is Dead" (P), "I Killed It" (P), "When the Light Goes Out (feat. Portugal The Man)" (P), "Cry Me a River" (P), "Classical Dragon (feat. Tim Henson" (P), "Smooth Operator" (P), "Allergies (feat. Delaney Bailey)", (P), "Nardis" (P), "I Don't Write About Girls (feat. Ichika Nito" (P), "Cough Syrup" (P), "Heart-Shaped Box" (P), "Bite Your Nails" (P)	Dragon in Harmony
2024	lovelytheband	"make it real" (W)	lovelytheband
2024	Winnetka Bowling League	"Breakfast for Dinner" (W) and "Happy Adjacent" (W)	Sha La La
2023	blink-182	"Edging" (W), "Dance With Me" (W), "More Than You Know" (W), "Turpentine" (W), "Other Side" (W)	One More Time...
2023	All Time Low	"New Religion (feat. Teddy Swims) (W/P)	Tell Me I'm Alive
2023	Hunter Hayes	"Missing You" (W/P) and "Normal" (W/P)	Red Sky
2022	Ari Hicks	"Sucker" (W/P), "Romeo Dies" (W/P/M), "Two Sides" (W/P/M), Pull Your Tooth" (W/P/M), "Jaded" (W/P/M)	It's Not That Deep: Chapter 1 EP
2022	Winnetka Bowling League	"Barcelona" (W), "Emotionalporn" (W)	Pulp
2022	Almost Monday	"Sunburn" (W)	You're Welcome
2021	Neon Trees	"Holiday Rock" (W/P/M)	Single
2021	Pentatonix	"A Little Space" (W/P), "Be My Eyes" (W/P), "Bored" (W/P), "Coffee In Bed" (W/P), "Exit Signs" (W/P), "Never Gonna Cry Again" (W/P), "Love Me When I Don't" (W/P), "It's Different Now" (P)	The Lucky Ones
2021	Smallpools	"Science Fiction" (W/P)	Life In a Simulation
2021	A Day To Remember	"Only Money" (W/P)	You're Welcome
2020	Britney Spears	"Swimming in the Stars" (W/VP)	Single
2020	Winnetka Bowling League	"Congratulations" (W/P), "Come To The Beach" (W/P), "The Romantic Way" (W/P)	Congratulations EP
2020	Dove Cameron	"Remember Me" ft. BIA (VP)	Single
2020	Chaz Cardigan	"Middle Of The Road" (W/P), "Losing Touch" (W)	Holograma
2019	Jordan McGraw	"We Should Still Be Friends" (W/P)	Single
2019	Mod Sun	"Tell Me All Your Secrets" (W/P)	Single
2019	One OK Rock	"In The Stars" ft. Kiiara (W/P), "Unforgettable" (W/P)	Eye Of The Storm
2019	Dove Cameron	"Bloodshot" (VP), "Waste" (VP)	Singles
2019	Rence	"Patience" (W/P)	Fall 2019 EP
2019	Chloe Lilac	"Highschool" (W/P)	Single
2019	Winnetka Bowling League	"Cloudy With A Chance Of Sun" (W/P), "Diane" (W)	Cloudy With a Chance Of Sun EP
2019	Dimitri Vegas & Like Mike ft. Era Istrefi	"Selfish" (W)	Single
2018	Winnetka Bowling League	"On the 5" (W/P), "Day Dreamer" (W/P), "Are You OK" (P)	Winnetka Bowling League EP
2018	lovelytheband	"I Like the Way" (W/P)	Finding it Hard to Smile
2018	Jordan Smith	"Feel Good" (W)	Only Love
2018	Halestorm	"White Dress" (W)	Vicious
2018	5 Seconds of Summer	"Ghost of You" (W/P) and "Babylon" (W/P)	Youngblood
2018	Hayley Kiyoko	"He'll Never Love You (HNLY)" (VP)	Expectations
2018	Weathers	"Shallow Water" (W) and "The Night is Calling" (W/P)	Kids in the Night, Pt 1 & 2 EPs
2017	All Time Low	"Good Times" (W/P), "Drugs & Candy" (W/P) and "Nightmares" (W)	Last Young Renegade
2017	Bone Thugs-n-Harmony	"Let It All Out" (W)	New Waves
2017	Hedley	"Better Days" (W/P), "Wild" (W) and "Tidal Wave" (W)	Cageless
2017	Shania Twain	"Let's Kiss and Make Up" (P), "Home Now" (AP/VP/Eng), "Roll Me on the River" (VP/Eng), "Life's About to Get Good" (AP/VP/Eng), "Who's Gonna Be Your Girl" (AP/VP/Eng), "I'm Alright" (AP/VP), "Where Do You Think You're Going" (AP/VP), "Swingin' With My Eyes Closed" (AP/VP), "All in All" (VP) and "We Got Something They Don't" (VP)	Now
2017	Matthew Koma	"Hard To Love" (VP), "Dear Ana" (VP), "Suitcase" (P)	Singles
2016	Breathe Carolina	"More Than Ever" (W/VP), "Vanish" (VP), and "Nights" (W/VP)	Sleepless EP
2016	Breathe Carolina	"Lovin" ft. APEK (W/VP) and "Giants" ft. Cara Faye (W/VP)	Singles
2016	Britney Spears	"Man on the Moon" (VP), "Liar" (VP)	Glory
2016	Hayley Kiyoko	"Gravel To Tempo" (VP), "Ease My Mind" (VP), "One Bad Night" (VP)	Citrine EP
2016	Matthew Koma	"Kisses Back" (P)	Single
2015	All Time Low	"Somethings Gotta Give" (W)	Future Hearts
2015	Bea Miller	"I Dare You" (VP), "Perfect Picture" (VP)	Not An Apology
2015	Breathe Carolina	"Anywhere But Home" (W/VP), "Platinum Hearts" (W/VP)	Singles
2015	Demi Lovato	"Wildfire" (VP), "Old Ways" (VP)	Confident
2015	Fifth Harmony	"Miss Movin On" (VP), "Leave My Heart Out Of This" (VP)	Better Together
2015	Flux Pavilion & Matthew Koma	"Emotional" (VP)	Tesla
2015	Giorgio Moroder ft. Matthew Koma	"Tempted" (W/VP)	Deja Vu
2015	Hilary Duff	"Breathe In, Breathe Out" (W/P), "Confetti" (VP), "Your Arms Around A Memory" (VP/AP)	Breathe In. Breathe Out.
2015	Matthew Koma	"So Fuckin Romantic" (W/P)	Single
2015	Sabrina Carpenter	"Eyes Wide Open" (VP)	Eyes Wide Open
2015	Steve Aoki ft. Matthew Koma	"Hysteria" (VP)	Neon Future II
2015	The Knocks & Matthew Koma	"I Wish (My Taylor Swift)" (VP)	55
2014	Cher Lloyd	"Sweet Despair" (VP)	Sorry I'm Late
2014	Dimitri Vegas, MOGUAI & Like Mike	"Body Talk" ft Julien Perretta (VP)	Single
2014	Hardwell ft. Matthew Koma	"Dare You" (VP)	Hardwell presents Revealed: Volume 5
2014	Tiesto	"Set Yourself Free (feat. Krewella)" (VP), "Wasted (feat. Matthew Koma)" (AP), "Written in Reverse (feat. Matthew Koma" (VP), "A Town Called Paradise (feat. Zac Barnett" (VP)	A Town Called Paradise
2014	Zedd ft. Matthew Koma & Miriam Bryant	"Find You" (AP)	Divergent: Original Motion Picture Soundtrack
2013	Big Time Rush	"Amazing" (W/P)	24/Seven
2013	Demi Lovato	"Heart Attack" (VP), "Two Pieces" (VP), "Never Been Hurt" (VP)	Demi
2013	Hot Chelle Rae	"Hung Up" (W/P)	Single
2013	Selena Gomez	"Forget Forever" (VP), "Save The Day" (VP)	Stars Dance
2013	Zendaya	"Bottle You Up" (VP)	Zendaya
2013	The Summer Set	"Maybe Tonight" (W/P), "The Way We Were" (W/P), "Someday" (W/P), "Jukebox" (P ), "Fuck You Over" (P ), "Legendary" (P ), "Rescue" (P )	Legendary
2012	All Time Low	"Me Without You (All I Ever Wanted)" (W)	Don't Panic: It's Longer Now!
2011	Hot Chelle Rae	"I Like It Like That" ft. New Boyz (W), "Keep You With Me" (W/P), "Forever Unstoppable" (W/P), "Whatever" (W/P), "Downtown Girl" (W/P), "Why Don't You Love Me" ft. Demi Lovato (P ), "The Only One" (P ), "I Wish" (P )	Whatever
2011	All Time Low	"Merry Christmas, Kiss My Ass" (W/P)	Dirty Work (US Deluxe)
2010	Miley Cyrus	"I'll Always Remember You" (VP)	Hannah Montana Forever
