= Beauty School Dropout (band) =

American rock band

- Origin: Los Angeles, California, U.S.
- Years active: 2020–present
- Label: Verswire
- Members: Colie Hutzler; Brent "Beepus" Burdett; Bardo Novotny; Colton Flurry
- Website: bsd.komi.io

Beauty School Dropout is an American rock band formed in Los Angeles, California, in 2020 by lead vocalist Cole "Colie" Hutzler, bassist Brent "Beepus" Burdett, producer/guitarist Bardo Novotny and drummer Colton Flurry.

== History ==
Beauty School Dropout was initially created by Cole Hutzler as a solo project while he was still part of the band Strangefaces. After Strangefaces disbanded, Hutzler brought in his former bandmate Brent Burdett on bass and Bardo Novotny as a producer and guitarist to expand the project into a full band. The group's early development was supported by Pete Wentz of Fall Out Boy and mentor Mark Hoppus of blink-182, under their Verswire label. Further support came from manager Nick Lippman, producer Diego Ruelas and Veeps founder Sherry Saeedi.

The band released their debut single, "Last Time", in February 2020. The song was followed by three other singles in the same year. In October 2021, the group released their debut EP, Boys Do Cry. The EP featured collaborations with artists like Jason Aalon Butler and Rob Cavallo. For live performances, the band included former Strange Faces member Mike Rose as a drummer to enhance their stage presence.

Their first studio album, We Made Plans & God Laughed, was released in August 2022. This album featured heavier guitar sounds and introspective lyrics, with a notable collaboration with Mark Hoppus on the single "Almost Famous". The album was supported by the groups first headlining tour, named The Almost Famous Tour. Two songs of the album were released as singles, the title song "We Made Plans & God Laughed" and "A$$A$$IN".

In February 2023, they released the first single of their upcoming album, "Freak". To promote the album, they did multiple online live performances for Vevo and Idobi Radio. In May 2023, the unplugged performances at Idobi Sessions of the songs "We Made Plans & God Laughed" and "Freak" were released as separate singles, alongside the new song "Dying to Be You". They also opened during concerts of multiple other bands, including Turnstile and Blink-182. In October 2023, they released their second studio album, Ready to Eat. The album also spawned two more singles, "Beautiful Waste" and "One Night Stand You".

In May 2024, the band appeared on Kid Brunswick's single "Out Of Style".

== Band members ==
- Colie Hutzler – lead vocals
- Brent "Beepus" Burdett – bass
- Bardo Novotny – guitars
- Colton Flurry – drums

== Discography ==
Studio albums

- We Made Plans & God Laughed (2022)
- Ready to Eat (2023)
- Where Did All the Butterflies Go? (2025)

EPs

- Jam in the Van (2020)
- Boys Do Cry (2021)
