= More Than You Know (Blink-182 song) =

Single by Blink-182

from the album One More Time...
- Released: September 21, 2023
- Recorded: 2022–2023
- Genre: Punk rock; pop-punk; post-hardcore
- Length: 3:37
- Label: Columbia
- Songwriters: Mark Hoppus; Tom DeLonge; Travis Barker; Aaron Rubin; Dan Book
- Producer: Travis Barker

Blink-182 singles chronology
"Edging" (2022)	"One More Time" / "More Than You Know" (2023)	"Dance with Me" (2023)

"More Than You Know" is a song recorded by American rock band Blink-182. Released on September 21, 2023, through Columbia Records along with the title track for the band's reunion album, One More Time.... It was written by bassist Mark Hoppus, guitarist Tom DeLonge, drummer Travis Barker, as well as recording engineer Aaron Rubin and songwriter Dan Book.

== Composition ==
Paul Brown of Wall of Sound described the opening of "More Than You Know" as a "sorrowful piano intro", which becomes a "fast-paced punk rock jam". Similarly, Mary Varvaris of Kill Your Stereo described the song as "a fist-pumping pop-punk banger". Jordan Darville of The Fader felt that the song harkened back to the band's 2003 untitled album, describing it as "energized and aggressive", while Andrew Sacher of BrooklynVegan also noted the similarities to the 2003 album, as well as 2011's Neighborhoods, stating that it contained "the heavier pop punk/post-hardcore fusion that defined [the two albums].

== Reception ==
Rolling Stone's Jon Blistein wrote that the song "finds Blink cranking up the guitars while maintaining a high level of emotional vulnerability and angst".

== Chart performance ==
"More Than You Know" debuted at number 95 on the UK Official Singles Downloads Chart on 22 September 2023.

== Personnel ==
Credits adapted from the song's YouTube video.

Blink-182

- Tom DeLonge – vocals, guitars, songwriting
- Mark Hoppus – vocals, bass guitar, songwriting
- Travis Barker – drums, songwriting

Additional musicians

- Kevin Bivona – piano, synthesizer

Production

- Travis Barker – producer
- Nicholas Morzov – recording
- Kevin Bivona – recording
- Eric Emery – recording
- John Warren – recording
- Kevin "Thrasher" Gruft – recording
- Aaron Rubin – recording, songwriting
- Dan Book – songwriting
- Adam Hawkins – mixing
- Henry Lunetta – mix assistant
- Randy Merrill – mastering

== Charts ==
Chart performance for "More Than You Know"
Chart (2023)	Peak position
Australia Digital Tracks (ARIA)	19
New Zealand Hot Singles (RMNZ)	28
UK Singles (OCC)	99
UK Rock & Metal (OCC)	7
US Hot Rock & Alternative Songs (Billboard)	41
