= Dance with Me (Blink-182 song) =

Single by Blink-182

from the album One More Time...
- Released: October 5, 2023
- Recorded: 2022–2023
- Genre: Pop-punk
- Length: 3:08
- Label: Columbia
- Songwriters: Mark Hoppus; Tom DeLonge; Travis Barker; Aaron Rubin; Nick Long; Dan Book
- Producer: Travis Barker

Blink-182 singles chronology
"One More Time" / "More Than You Know" (2023)	"Dance with Me" (2023)	"Fell in Love" (2023)

Music video
- "Dance with Me" on YouTube

"Dance with Me" is a song recorded by American rock band Blink-182. The song was released on October 5, 2023, through Columbia Records as the fourth single from their ninth album One More Time.... It was written by bassist Mark Hoppus, guitarist Tom DeLonge, and drummer Travis Barker, alongside engineer Aaron Rubin and songwriters Dan Book and Nick Long. The song is built around a rapid-fire guitar riff and features a chanting chorus punctuated by the repeated refrain "olé, olé, olé". Lyrically, "Dance with Me" centers on romantic longing and reckless attraction.

Critics praised "Dance with Me" for its energetic sound; reviewers highlighted its humor, intensity, and singalong appeal. The song's music video pays tribute to the Ramones, with Blink-182 recreating imagery from the band's music videos and album artwork while dressed in wigs, leather jackets, and sunglasses inspired by the group.

== Background ==
The song opens with a crude, spoken-word joke from DeLonge: "When I teach masturbation, I'm always just like, 'Have fun with it.'" Throughout the song, DeLonge encourages a partner to dance, with lyrics like "I've been waiting around to lose / So dumb, trying to make believe / You're mine, what are you gonna do / Come here, do you want to come dance with me?" Columnists for Spin observed the song shares a title with another song by T.S.O.L., one of DeLonge's preferred groups.

== Music video ==
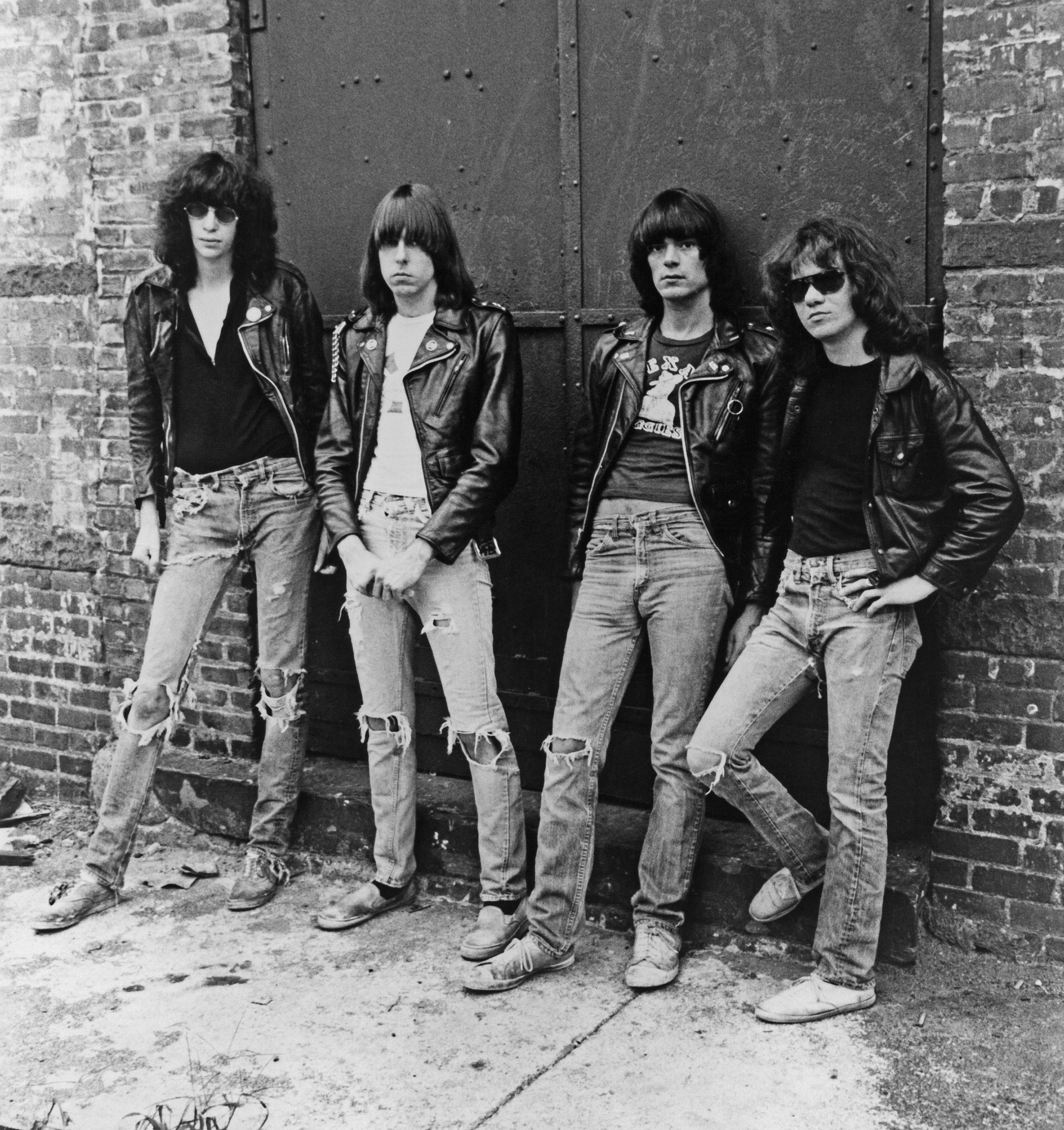
The song's music video is a tribute to the Ramones.

The song's music video was intended as a "love letter" to the Ramones, one of their biggest influences. It finds the band dressing up in the style of the Ramones, including wigs, sunglasses, and leather jackets. The clip begins with an interview (featuring Lisa Gilroy as host), spoofing the Ramones' 1981 interview on The Tomorrow Show. As the song begins, the video switches to the three seated at a table—a reference to the 1988 "I Wanna Be Sedated" visual—while doctors, nurses (with one portraying the nurse from the band's own Enema of the State album cover), clowns, cheerleaders, construction workers, brides, and various other people run around. The footage is intercut with shots of the band playing at a CBGB-style backdrop, as well as posing in front of a brick wall, a la the Ramones' famous debut album cover.

The video was directed by the Malloys, with whom the band last collaborated with on the 2001 videos for "The Rock Show" and "First Date".

== Reception ==
"Dance with Me" was well-received among music critics. Kate Solomon at The Guardian observed: "Blink have not lost their knack for crafting thumping choruses before hitting you with a ghostly, mesmeric bridge to remind you that life is fleeting and you might as well be in a sweaty pile of bodies yelling “olé olé olé” while you’re here." Bobby Olivier at Spin called it "a high-tempo party cut with its deliciously dopey chorus [...] Is it a little hollow? Sure, but you'll be singing before the tune is finished." Uproxx writer Danielle Chelosky described the "clamorous" song "as fun as it is loud, and the lyrics are as chaotic as the sound." Helen Brown from The Independent commended its energy and "pelting pace," while Gil Kaufman of Billboard described "Dance with Me" as a "raucous pop-punk tune".

Many reviewers favorably compared the song to the band's earlier material. Stereogum editorialist Pranav Trewn viewed the song as a "real gem" that earns its place among "pre-hiatus material on a setlist." Emma Wilkes from NME concurred: the "gloriously sticky hook is instantly memorable and is silly enough to have been a relic from Blink’s most popular era." Matt Collar from AllMusic considered the song a "classic Blink-anthem that wouldn't sound out of place" on its millennial albums.

== Personnel ==
Credits adapted from the song's YouTube video.

Blink-182

- Tom DeLonge – vocals, guitar, songwriting
- Mark Hoppus – vocals, bass guitar, songwriting
- Travis Barker – drums, songwriting

Additional Musician

- Kevin Bivona – piano, synthesizer

Production

- Travis Barker – producer
- Nick Long – co-producer, songwriting
- Aaron Rubin – co-producer, recording, songwriting
- Dan Book – songwriting
- Nicholas Morzov – recording
- Kevin Bivona – recording
- Eric Emery – recording
- John Warren – recording
- Kevin "Thrasher" Gruft – recording
- Adam Hawkins – mixing
- Henry Lunetta – mix assistant
- Randy Merrill – mastering

== Charts ==
Chart performance for "Dance with Me"
Chart (2023)	Peak position
Australia Digital Tracks (ARIA)	26
Italy Airplay (FIMI)	76
New Zealand Hot Singles (RMNZ)	23
UK Singles (Official Charts)	55
UK Rock & Metal (OCC)	6
US Hot Rock & Alternative Songs (Billboard)	28
