= One More Time (Blink-182 song) =

Single by Blink-182

from the album One More Time...
- B-side: "More Than You Know"
- Released: September 21, 2023
- Recorded: 2023
- Genre: Pop-punk; ballad; acoustic
- Length: 3:28
- Label: Columbia
- Songwriters: Mark Hoppus; Tom DeLonge; Travis Barker; Andrew Goldstein; Gregory Hein
- Producer: Travis Barker

Blink-182 singles chronology
"Edging" (2022)	"One More Time" / "More Than You Know" (2023)	"Dance with Me" (2023)

Music video
- "One More Time" on YouTube

"One More Time" is a song recorded by American rock band Blink-182. The song was released on September 21, 2023, through Columbia Records as the second single for their ninth album of the same name. It was written by bassist Mark Hoppus, guitarist Tom DeLonge, and drummer Travis Barker, with Barker co-producing the song alongside songwriters Andrew Goldstein and Aldae. "One More Time" is a ballad that centers on concepts of friendship, time, and reflecting on the past. It proceeds at a gentle tempo, incorporating acoustic guitar, piano, and brushes.

"One More Time" received mainly positive reviews from music critics; many found it touching while others viewed it as overly saccharine. It became one of the band's biggest modern radio singles in the U.S., where it peaked for a record-setting 20 weeks atop Billboard's Alternative Airplay chart; it also became their first crossover hit since 2004's "I Miss You".

== Background ==
"One More Time" originated during a studio session between Barker and songwriter Gregory Eric Hein, known professionally as Aldae, and pop/alt pop songwriter Andrew Goldstein. Aldae initially conceived the song as being about a romantic relationship, before Barker suggested reframing the song around Blink-182's own relationship and the years of conflict and estrangement between its members. He felt the change offered a fresher perspective and would carry greater personal significance for both the band and its audience.

The song was mostly completed when Barker presented it to his bandmates. Barker was reticent to send them a piece that felt completed as he wanted their creative input, but the band was largely receptive. DeLonge in particular was touched by the song, telling Barker that he and his wife felt emotional after listening to it. The three worked through "20 or 30" different versions of the song, ranging from renditions with guitar-heavy outros. "We’re always like, 'When does it get big? When do the big guitars come in?'," DeLonge noted, but they erred on keeping it simple, feeling as though the song worked better without a build-up. Barker kept it simple on the final track, which employs a brush-stroked fill that was recorded on a vintage Ludwig Black Beauty snare from 1938.

In an interview, DeLonge expanded on the song's concept and themes:

With Blink, I always feel like we're the guys next door. A lot of people knew more about us individually, and our stories in the band. So I feel like our story as a band is a little more present than a lot of rock bands. Having a song like ["One More Time"], I think a lot of people can relate, because we all get older and look back [...] I think it was a good moment for us to relate on a really human level and bring people more into our story. Which is essentially punk rock [...] it's a vehicle for emotion, it's a vehicle for kind of eternal youth with our band.

== Composition ==
Sadie Bell of People described the song as an "emotional, pop-punk ballad." The song is based around an acoustic guitar riff, and later incorporates piano. DeLonge opens the song by addressing his exits from the band and how they impacted his relationship to both Hoppus and Barker: "Strangers, from strangers into brothers / From brothers into strangers once again." Hoppus answers in his second verse, directly referencing his own battle with cancer, as well as Barker's survival of a deadly 2008 plane crash. Each chorus asks questions: "Do I have to die to hear you miss me?" In the shortened second verse, the duo resolve to overcome, observing that time is short. The song's soft tone and natural instrumentation, as well as refrain of "I miss you" was widely interpreted as a reference to the band's seminal 2004 hit. As the song climaxes, the band's three members—Barker included, in a rare vocal spot—sing the song's refrain.

== Music video ==
The song's music video was directed by Carlos López Estrada, and features the band performing the song on a set that switches between backgrounds from the band's previous music videos—including "All the Small Things", "Adam's Song", "First Date", "Feeling This" and more. It also incorporates other key memories from the group's career, including sets emulating stages at Warped Tour 1999, their headlining show at Reading Festival in 2014, MTV Spring Break at Daytona Beach from 2000, the TRL studio, and the front cover of their live album The Mark, Tom, and Travis Show (The Enema Strikes Back!). As the song reaches its conclusion, the clip shifts to archival footage of the group from their youth. The video concept originated at Columbia, the band's record label.

== Chart performance ==
In the US, "One More Time" performed well, debuting and peaking at number 62 on the main Billboard Hot 100; its first weekend notched two million plays on radio and a million streams, allowing it to top the Billboard's Hot Trending Songs chart for an inaugural time. "One More Time" ultimately became an airplay juggernaut on Billboard's Alternative Airplay chart, where it peaked at number one for a record-setting twenty consecutive weeks, tied for the longest reign in the ranking's history. It also marked the first time Blink-182 achieved back-to-back number ones on that chart. It also topped the Rock & Alternative Airplay chart, and peaked at number two on Mainstream Rock Airplay. As the group entered the Adult Pop Airplay chart for the first time in 18 years, "One More Time" ultimately became the group's first crossover hit since "I Miss You". It peaked at number 13 on that chart, marking their highest rank in their career. It also became the band's first-ever charting song on Adult Contemporary, where it ranked at number 27, as well as Adult Alternative Airplay, where it peaked at number 36.

Internationally, it became the group's highest-charting single on the UK Singles Chart in nearly two decades, debuting at number 28 on the all-genre ranking; the band's last single to reach the top 30 of that chart was "Down" in 2004.

== Release and reception ==
The song debuted alongside "More Than You Know", another single from One More Time..., with both issued to digital outlets as a joint single. Rolling Stone's Jon Blistein wrote that the tune "finds Blink indulging in a bit of endearing, well-earned pop-punk nostalgia." NME contributor Liberty Dunworth viewed it as "one of the more heartfelt and reflective tracks of their extensive discography." Dustin Nelson of Entertainment Weekly dubbed it a "fitting" comeback single, while Billboard's Starr Bowenbank viewed it as "heart-wrenching." Brian Davids of The Hollywood Reporter joked that the song "makes grown men cry," praising its "impact and emotion". Bobby Olivier from Spin viewed it as a "ballad successor to 'I Miss You'", while Helen Brown of The Independent found the "funereal" track to be too "soppy". In context of the album, NME's Emma Wilkes wrote that the title track is "the emotional apex of an album doused in sentimentality."

Paolo Ragusa from Consequence opined that the tune "may be sappy, but it doesn’t feel obligatory or performative. It’s interesting enough for the band to be writing songs about being in the band instead of half-hearted youthful anguish." Pitchfork's Arielle Gordon considered the band using their own "lore" for lyrics cheap: "The story is one of enduring friendship, reduced to vacuous balladry that reads like a high school poetry assignment [...] it sounds self-congratulatory, like a band doing cheap covers of its own songs." Pranav Trwen at Stereogum felt similarly: "The sentiment of the plainspoken ballad is powerful, lived in, and undoubtedly earned [...] But why must that sentiment be attached to a song so uninspired, paint-by-numbers, and just overwhelmingly milquetoast? Treacly and heavy-handed, it suggested that Blink were letting the narrative drive their reunion instead of any innate musical curiosity still existing between the three."

=== Accolades ===
The song won the award for Alternative Song of the Year at the 2024 iHeartRadio Music Awards.

== Track listing ==
No.	Title	Writer(s)	Length
1.	"One More Time"	Tom DeLonge; Mark Hoppus; Travis Barker; Andrew Goldstein; Gregory Hein	3:28
2.	"More Than You Know"	DeLonge; Hoppus; Barker; Aaron Rubin; Dan Book	3:37

== Personnel ==
Credits adapted from the song's YouTube video.

Blink-182

- Tom DeLonge – vocals, acoustic guitar, songwriting
- Mark Hoppus – vocals, bass guitar, songwriting
- Travis Barker – drums, vocals, songwriting

Additional musician

- Kevin Bivona – piano, strings

Technical

- Travis Barker – producer
- Andrew Goldstein – co-producer, songwriting
- Gregory Hein – songwriting
- Nicholas Morzov – recording
- Kevin Bivona – recording
- Eric Emery – recording
- John Warren – recording
- Kevin Gruft – recording
- Aaron Rubin – recording
- Mark "Spike" Stent – mixing
- Matt Wolach – mix assistant
- Randy Merrill – mastering

== Charts ==
=== Weekly charts ===
Weekly chart performance for "One More Time"
Chart (2023–24)	Peak position
Australia (ARIA)	51
Bolivia Anglo Airplay (Monitor Latino)	7
Canada Hot 100 (Billboard)	41
Canada Hot AC (Billboard)	31
Canada Rock (Billboard)	2
Costa Rica (Monitor Latino)	18
Czech Republic Airplay (ČNS IFPI)	4
Czech Republic Rock (IFPI)	1
German Download (Official German Charts)	18
Global 200 (Billboard)	105
Ireland (IRMA)	70
Italy (Radio Top 40)	10
Latvia Airplay (LAIPA)	18
New Zealand Hot Singles (RMNZ)	9
San Marino (SMRRTV Top 50)	10
UK Singles (Official Charts)	28
US Billboard Hot 100	62
US Hot Rock & Alternative Songs (Billboard)	10
US Adult Contemporary (Billboard)	26
US Adult Pop Airplay (Billboard)	13
US Rock & Alternative Airplay (Billboard)	1

=== Year-end charts ===
Year-end chart performance for "One More Time"
Chart (2024)	Position
US Adult Top 40 (Billboard)	40
US Hot Rock & Alternative Songs (Billboard)	48
US Rock Airplay (Billboard)	1

== Certifications ==
Certifications for "One More Time"
Region	Certification	Certified units/sales
United States (RIAA)	Gold	500,000^{‡}
^{‡} Sales+streaming figures based on certification alone.
