= Edging (song) =

Single by Blink-182

from the album One More Time...
- Released: October 14, 2022
- Recorded: 2022
- Genre: Pop-punk; punk rock
- Length: 2:31 (single version); 2:29 (album version)
- Label: Columbia
- Songwriters: Mark Hoppus; Tom DeLonge; Travis Barker; Dan Book; Nick Long
- Producer: Travis Barker

Blink-182 singles chronology
"Quarantine" (2020)	"Edging" (2022)	"One More Time" / "More Than You Know" (2023)

Music video
- "Edging" on YouTube

"Edging" (stylized in all caps) is a song recorded by American rock band Blink-182. The song was released on October 14, 2022, through Columbia Records, initially as a standalone single; it was later included on their ninth album One More Time... (2023). It was written by bassist Mark Hoppus, guitarist Tom DeLonge, and drummer Travis Barker, alongside songwriters Dan Book and Nick Long. It marked the group's first release following the return of DeLonge after a seven-year hiatus. Musically, "Edging" is a mid-tempo pop-punk track produced by Travis Barker with a focus on modernizing the band's sound.

"Edging" achieved broad international chart success for Blink-182, topping multiple rock charts in North America and the UK, and charting within the top 50 in several countries worldwide. Critics generally responded positively to "Edging", praising Blink-182 for recapturing their signature pop-punk energy and catchy, tongue-in-cheek style, though some felt its familiar structure and polish made it feel more nostalgic than innovative. The song's music video shows Blink-182 performing in a surreal and rundown carnival surrounded by people in bunny costumes. It was nominated for Best Alternative Video at the 2023 MTV Video Music Awards.

== Background ==
On producing the song, Barker offered: "I wanted to imagine as a listener what I wanted to experience and at the same time as a band member what we wanted to make and say and most importantly how it would sound production wise in 2022." Though the song's title refers to the sexual practice, the song's lyrics do not directly reference it.

The band first announced the song with a promotional video announcing their reunion with DeLonge on October 11, with further clips shared on TikTok.

== Composition ==
The song has been cited as being a pop-punk and punk rock song by critics.

== Music video ==
The song's music video was directed by Cole Bennett, and produced through his Lyrical Lemonade studio. In the clip, the band is seen playing the song in a run down carnival surrounded by people in rabbit costumes, who they then proceed to murder with throwing knives. Lyrical Lemonade released an alternate version of the video, featuring cameo appearances by Bennett himself and rapper Lil Tracy on October 19, 2022.

== Commercial performance ==
"Edging" achieved a strong international chart presence following its release, marking a notable commercial return for Blink-182 across multiple territories. In the United States, "Edging" became the band's highest-charting single on the all-genre Hot 100 in eighteen years, posting at number 61. It also made its debut at number twelve on Billboard's Alternative Airplay after just three days of tracking. It went on to become the band's fourth and longest number one single in its history to that point, spending 13 weeks on top of Alternative Airplay, where it also gave Blink-182 a top placement single in four different decades, tying them with Green Day and Red Hot Chili Peppers for the most ever by an artist. In addition, "Edging" became their biggest hit on Billboard's Mainstream Rock Airplay, peaking at number two. In Canada, it climbed to number 25 on the Canadian Hot 100 while also topping the Canada Rock chart, underscoring its strong reception within rock radio formats.

Outside North America, "Edging" charted across several regions, including a peak of number 31 on the UK Singles Chart and number 50 in Australia. It also reached the top 10 of New Zealand's Hot Singles chart, peaking at number 7, and appeared on various European and international rankings such as Germany, Italy, Ireland, and San Marino. Additionally, it hit number 1 on the UK Rock & Metal chart and Japan's Hot Overseas chart.

== Reception ==
The song received positive reviews from contemporary music critics. Jason Lipshutz at Billboard opined that the track "proves that DeLonge, Mark Hoppus and Travis Barker still know how to get in a room and create tight, catchy, exceedingly sophomoric pop-punk; it's great to have them back." Stereogum columnist Rachel Brodsky called the tune "fun, flippant, and satisfying as hell". Lars Brandle from Billboard called it "straight-up Blink-182 material, hewn from misspent youth and with all the bluster, swagger and stop-on-a-dime detail that made the threesome one of the most popular alternative rock acts of its era." Ellie Robinson from NME dubbed the "belting pop-punk anthem" an ode to the "dissolution of a relationship". Sam Roche from Guitar World characterized the tune as a "mid-tempo bouncy number loaded with Blink's tried-and-tested stylistic devices, including punchy powerchords, a stellar drum performance and a light-hearted tongue-in-cheek set of lyrics." Jon Caramanica of The New York Times considered it sterile, writing, "It's familiar but uncanny, Botoxed tight but with none of the puerile joy that marked the group's breakout hits."

== Personnel ==
Blink-182

- Tom DeLonge – vocals, guitars, songwriting
- Mark Hoppus – vocals, bass guitar, songwriting
- Travis Barker – drums, songwriting

Other musicians

- Kevin Bivona – organ, synthesizer

Production

- Travis Barker – producer
- Aaron Rubin – recording
- Kevin "Thrasher" Gruft – recording
- Nicholas Morzov – recording
- Şerban Ghenea – mixing
- Bryce Bordone – mix assistant
- Nick Long – songwriting
- Dan Book – songwriting
- Randy Merrill – mastering

== Charts ==
=== Weekly charts ===
Weekly chart performance for "Edging"
Chart (2022)	Peak position
Australia (ARIA)	50
Canada Hot 100 (Billboard)	25
Canada Rock (Billboard)	1
German Download Singles (Official German Charts)	20
Global 200 (Billboard)	78
Ireland (IRMA)	63
Italy Airplay (FIMI)	39
Japan Hot Overseas (Billboard Japan)	18
New Zealand Hot Singles (RMNZ)	7
San Marino (SMRRTV Top 50)	42
UK Singles (Official Charts)	31
UK Rock & Metal (Official Charts)	1
US Billboard Hot 100	61
US Hot Rock & Alternative Songs (Billboard)	7
US Rock & Alternative Airplay (Billboard)	1

=== Year-end charts ===
Year-end chart performance for "Edging"
Chart (2023)	Position
US Hot Rock & Alternative Songs (Billboard)	88
US Rock Airplay (Billboard)	4

== Accolades ==
Awards and nominations for "Edging"
Organization	Year	Category	Result	Ref.
MTV Video Music Awards	2023	Best Alternative	Nominated	
