= I Miss You (Blink-182 song) =

2004 single by Blink-182

Single by Blink-182

from the album Blink-182
- Released: February 2, 2004
- Recorded: 2003
- Studio: The Rubin's House (San Diego, California)
- Genre: Emo; alternative rock
- Length: 3:47
- Label: Geffen; Island
- Songwriters: Tom DeLonge; Mark Hoppus; Travis Barker
- Producer: Jerry Finn

Blink-182 singles chronology
"Feeling This" (2003)	"I Miss You" (2004)	"Down" (2004)

Music video
- "I Miss You" on YouTube

"I Miss You" is a song by the American rock band Blink-182. It was released as the second single from the group's self-titled album (2003) on February 2, 2004, through Geffen Records. An emo and alternative rock song, it was written by guitarist Tom DeLonge, bassist Mark Hoppus, and drummer Travis Barker, and was produced by Jerry Finn. The track marks a stylistic departure for the band, built around acoustic instrumentation including stand-up bass, cello, piano, and a brushstroked drum loop, layered into a moody, groove-driven arrangement. Its gothic style was inspired by the Cure.

The song was developed in a home studio that had been built out inside a rented mansion. DeLonge and Hoppus went to separate rooms to write lyrics based on the theme, finding ways to combine them after time apart. The song explores vulnerability and heartache in love, conveying the fear of emotional loss and unreciprocated feelings. The song's artful music video, shot by Jonas Åkerlund, depicts the trio in a haunted mansion run by ghosts. "I Miss You" topped Billboard's Hot Modern Rock Tracks chart in the US; it also charted across the globe, and was a top ten hit in the United Kingdom.

Music critics complimented the song's unconventional structure and tone. The song's dark, emo-inflected feel built lasting popularity, and DeLonge's distinctive vocal delivery in the song became iconic. "I Miss You" has been frequently covered by artists across genres; it was a primary inspiration for the 2010s hit "Closer" by the Chainsmokers. It has been recognized in retrospective rankings as one of the band's best songs. It is among the songs to surpass one billion streams on Spotify.

== Background and promotion ==
"I Miss You" was recorded in 2003 and first took shape at the Rubin's House, a rented home in the San Diego luxury community of Rancho Santa Fe. During the sessions, the band spent time listening to the Cure, one of their longtime favorite bands and influences. Barker recalled that the members were particularly taken with songs such as "The Love Cats" (1983), and began discussing the idea of writing something in a similar vein. Hoppus developed the song's bassline, which Barker accompanied with a brush-based drum pattern. Barker persuaded the band to loop the pattern rather than develop a more dynamic part, believing that its repetition complemented the sparse arrangement and gave the song a hypnotic quality reminiscent of dance music. The song underwent several musical changes as it developed; the band initially experimented with a substantially different chorus that they felt resembled adult contemporary music, before abandoning it in favor of the song's eventual arrangement.

Hoppus and DeLonge began writing over the resulting loop, using the same method with which the band wrote "Feeling This" (2003). After first discussing the song's themes to ensure they were "on the same page", the two separated to write independently before combining their contributions. Hoppus wrote the first verse and chorus, while DeLonge contributed the second verse. "Mark was always really, really good with words, so a lot of times I would ask him for help with things, to get help with how I say things better [...] But we never really explained song meanings to each other," DeLonge recalled. At Barker's suggestion, Hoppus incorporated imagery from Tim Burton's The Nightmare Before Christmas (1993), referencing its characters Jack and Sally in a passage directed toward Barker's then-wife, Shanna Moakler. Hoppus later shared his original handwritten lyrics to the song on Twitter in 2018.

In expanding on the song's lyrical meaning, DeLonge said: "The song's more about the vulnerability and kind of heart-wrenching pain you feel when you're in love and when you're a guy and you're trying to tell a girl, 'Don't waste your time coming and talking to me because, in my head at least, you probably already gave me up a long time ago.'" The song, along with the album, was produced by Jerry Finn.

== Composition ==
"I Miss You"
The song is acoustic, and features an upright bass, a cello, and a brushstroked drum loop.

"I Miss You" is a power ballad that has been classified as an emo and alternative rock song, with a length of three minutes and forty-seven seconds. According to sheet music published at Musicnotes.com by EMI Music Publishing, it is composed in the key of B major and is set in the time signature of common time with a tempo of 111 beats per minute. Hoppus and DeLonge's vocal range spans from F#_{2} to F#_{4}. The instruments are all acoustic, featuring a piano, cello, acoustic bass guitar, and a "brushstroked hip-hop groove." The song's production was very layered, requiring multiple tracks. "There's probably 50 tracks of instruments going on the record," DeLonge said. In an interview with The Washington Post, he re-estimated the amount: "It's got about 70 tracks of instruments, all of which are organic/acoustic, none of them plugged-in."

== Release and critical reception ==
The first appearance of "I Miss You" was on Blink-182. The album was released on November 18, 2003, through Geffen Records, with "I Miss You" as the third song on the standard tracklist. The song was later released as a single in the United States on February 2, 2004, and in Australia and the United Kingdom on February 16 and March 1. CD and 7-inch singles of the song were released, with the CD including "Not Now" as a B-side and a music video for "Feeling This", while the 7-inch features a remix of the song by James Guthrie. "I Miss You" was later featured on the track list for Blink-182's 2005 compilation album, Greatest Hits. The song was also released on Icon (2013), the band's second greatest hits album.

"I Miss You" received positive reviews from contemporary music critics. Jesse Lord of IGN praised the "well-thought-out dissonance" between Hoppus and DeLonge's respective vocal tracks, opining that it "expertly showcases and highlights the differences between the two." Nick Catucci of The Village Voice praised the song, writing, "It's how Tom and Mark zing off of one another that makes Blink-182 one of the greats. Name another two dudes who can so naturally share a tender, swelling ballad like 'I Miss You.'" A.D. Amorosi of The Philadelphia Inquirer wrote that "post-teen amour drips through an acoustic 'I Miss You', with singer-guitarist Tom DeLonge in Marshall Crenshaw mode." Spin called it an "interstate breakup song," commending its use of strings and jazz brushes. In 2016, Stereogum ranked the song number four on their list of the 10 greatest Blink-182 songs, and in 2022, Kerrang! ranked the song number three on their list of the 20 greatest Blink-182 songs.

== Commercial performance ==
"I Miss You" performed best on Billboard's Modern Rock Tracks chart, where it peaked at number one for two weeks. The song also charted at number 15 on the Pop Songs chart, and number 24 on the Adult Pop Songs chart. On the Billboard Hot 100, it reached number 42, and also peaked at number 44 on the Hot 100 Airplay chart. Outside the United States, "I Miss You" performed best in the United Kingdom and New Zealand; in both countries it charted at number eight. It also charted at number 13 in Australia, and number 21 in Ireland.

DeLonge said the success of "I Miss You" introduced Blink-182 to a broader mainstream audience, noting that the song was receiving airplay on radio stations that had not previously played the band. "I Miss You" was supported by a controversial initiative dubbed "spin buys" by Billboard, in which labels, in Blink's case Geffen, spent thousands of dollars per week to have singles played multiple times from midnight to 6 am at small and middle-market radio chains. While overnight airplay at radio at that time was "nothing new for the recording industry," label-sponsored spin-programs had risen considerably in popularity in 2004. By May 2004, the track had accumulated more than 50,000 spins at radio, and more than 100,000 by July. The song was certified gold by the Recording Industry Association of America (RIAA) on October 25, 2004, for sales of over 500,000.

== Music video ==
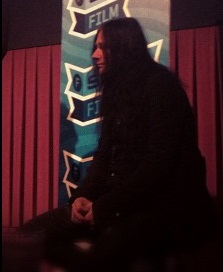
The music video of "I Miss You" was directed by Jonas Åkerlund (pictured).

The music video for "I Miss You" was directed by Jonas Åkerlund. It is shot in the style of a 1930s film, and find the trio performing in a haunted house with ghosts circling around. Filming for the video took place on December 17, 2003, in Los Angeles. It also features Hoppus playing a double bass, inspired by Phil Thornalley of the Cure's use of one in the video for "The Love Cats".

After a sneak preview aired on MTV on January 22, 2004, the full music video officially premiered on the channel four days later, on January 26, 2004. The song achieved heavy airplay on music video channels. It achieved its best airplay on Canada's MuchMusic, where it was the number one most-played video for the week ending February 22, 2004, as monitored by Nielsen Broadcast Data Systems. For Fuse, the song was the eighth-most played that week, eleventh for MTV, and fourteenth for MTV2. It continued to be a strong performer on Fuse and MuchMusic into May, with the issue dated May 15 reporting it at numbers 9 and eleven, respectively. It remained in the top 30 most-played at MuchMusic into January 2005.

Following the Super Bowl XXXVIII halftime show controversy, MTV briefly restricted the daytime airing of explicit music videos, including "I Miss You". The video was temporarily replaced with a toned-down European edit that removed some of its more controversial imagery. MTV later restored broader rotation of the video after easing its post-Super Bowl broadcast restrictions. Following the incident, DeLonge argued that broadcasters had become overly sensitive to controversial content.

== Legacy ==
"I Miss You" continues to enjoy significant and widespread popularity decades after its release; it is one of several songs to count over one billion streams on Spotify, joining the platform's "Billions Club". DeLonge's singing style on "I Miss You"–particularly his verse lyrics "Where are you / and I'm so sorry" and pronunciation of the word head as "yead" in the chorus—has been widely referenced throughout popular culture, and is considered something of a meme. DeLonge has publicly embraced the attention. Finneas once described DeLonge's delivery: "Tom comes into that song like he was on a balcony and he jumped off the balcony onto the song." A 10-hour YouTube loop of only DeLonge's verse from 2015 went viral, with David Anthony of The A.V. Club calling it "oddly hypnotic."

The song has been a staple of the band's live performances since its release. It is typically ended with an extended coda that builds into a crescendo. Chris Payne of Stereogum described "I Miss You" the band's most enduring song, highlighting its gothic embrace of the Hot Topic scene. Variety ranked it as one of the best emo songs of all time, and Rolling Stone ranked it among the "250 Greatest Songs of the 21st Century So Far" in 2025, praising its "vulnerability and mature candor." Kate Solomon, writing for The Guardian, compared "I Miss You" to "One More Time", a later song by the band, specifically comparing Delonge's vocals and the brushed drum tracks.

=== In popular culture ===
Several artists have covered "I Miss You", including Australian band 5 Seconds of Summer, This Wild Life, Slowly Slowly, and Yung Pinch. Various indie artists mockingly covered the song in 2020 for a viral response to Gal Gadot's ill-timed "Imagine" cover. The artists included Eric Slick, Mac DeMarco, Danny Brown, Fleet Foxes' Robin Pecknold, Natalie Prass, Kevin Morby, Caroline Rose, Whitney, among others. Fred Again played a remix of the song as part of his 2023 Coachella set, while Chilean band Kudai used the drum sample of the song on their single "Escapar" from their 2004 album Vuelo. It has also been used as a cover for American Idol contestants. DeLonge has also covered the song with his other band, Angels & Airwaves. In 2019, American singer-songwriter Skye employed an interpolation of "I Miss You" in his single "Voices", posthumously featuring rapper XXXTentacion.

The song was a primary inspiration for the Chainsmokers' 2016 hit single "Closer". According to Chainsmokers member Andrew Taggart, the duo repeatedly listened to the song while writing it. Prior to "Closer", on which she is featured, Halsey received attention online for a 2015 video that showed her performing a cover of "I Miss You" inside of a mall. In the video, Halsey, who was 20 at the time and had gained a small following on the social media app Tumblr, was hosting an impromptu meetup with her fans. In a 2025 interview, she said: "I went and met all these fans. It was the first time I'd ever met a fan before, and they were like, 'Will you sing?' and I was like, I never sang outside of my bedroom before." The video has been regarded as an early career breakthrough for the singer.

== Personnel ==
Credits are adapted from the Blink-182 liner notes.

Blink-182

- Mark Hoppus – acoustic bass guitar, vocals
- Tom DeLonge – acoustic guitar, vocals
- Travis Barker – brushed drum loop

Additional personnel

- Roger Joseph Manning, Jr. – keyboards

== Charts ==
=== Weekly charts ===
Chart (2004)	Peak position
Australia (ARIA)	13
Austria (Ö3 Austria Top 40)	41
Canada CHR/Pop Top 30 (Radio & Records)	10
Canada Rock Top 30 (Radio & Records)	7
Czech Republic (IFPI)	6
Europe (Eurochart Hot 100)	19
Germany (GfK)	32
Ireland (IRMA)	21
New Zealand (Recorded Music NZ)	8
Scottish Singles Sales (Official Charts)	7
Sweden (Sverigetopplistan)	55
Switzerland (Schweizer Hitparade)	51
UK Singles (Official Charts)	8
UK Airplay (Music Week)	29
US Billboard Hot 100	42
US Adult Pop Airplay (Billboard)	24
US Alternative Airplay (Billboard)	1
US Pop Airplay (Billboard)	15

=== Year-end charts ===
Chart (2004)	Position
Australia (ARIA)	74
UK Singles (OCC)	114
US Adult Top 40 (Billboard)	71
US Mainstream Top 40 (Billboard)	76
US Modern Rock Tracks (Billboard)	11

== Certifications ==
Region	Certification	Certified units/sales
Australia (ARIA)	Gold	35,000^{^}
Brazil (Pro-Música Brasil)	Gold	30,000^{‡}
Germany (BVMI)	Gold	150,000^{‡}
Italy (FIMI) sales since 2009	Platinum	70,000^{‡}
New Zealand (RMNZ)	3× Platinum	90,000^{‡}
Spain (Promusicae)	Gold	30,000^{‡}
United Kingdom (BPI)	2× Platinum	1,200,000^{‡}
United States (RIAA)	Gold	500,000^{*}
^{*} Sales figures based on certification alone.^{^} Shipments figures based on certification alone.^{‡} Sales+streaming figures based on certification alone.

== Release history ==
Region	Date	Format(s)	Label(s)	Ref.
United States	February 2, 2004	Alternative radio	Geffen	
Australia	February 16, 2004	CD	Geffen	
United Kingdom	March 1, 2004	7-inch vinyl; CD	Geffen; Island	
