= Always (Blink-182 song) =

2004 single by Blink-182

Single by Blink-182

from the album Blink-182
- B-side: "I Miss You" (Live in Minneapolis)
- Released: November 15, 2004
- Recorded: 2003
- Genre: New wave; power pop; post-punk; synth-pop
- Length: 4:12 (album version); 4:18 (Greatest Hits version)
- Label: Geffen
- Songwriters: Tom DeLonge; Mark Hoppus; Travis Barker
- Producer: Jerry Finn

Blink-182 singles chronology
"Down" (2004)	"Always" (2004)	"Not Now" (2005)

Music video
- "Always" on YouTube

"Always" is a song by American rock band Blink-182, released on November 15, 2004, as the fourth and final single from the group's untitled fifth studio album (2003). Written by bassist Mark Hoppus, guitarist Tom DeLonge, and drummer Travis Barker, the song is an uptempo love song that blends the band's pop-punk foundation with new wave, post-punk, and power pop influences. Characterized by effects-laden guitars, synthesizers, and layered instrumentation, it reflects the trio's growing embrace of 1980s-inspired songwriting. It was produced by Jerry Finn.

The accompanying music video, directed by Joseph Kahn, was noted for its innovative three-panel split-screen presentation, requiring precisely choreographed performances from the band and actress Sophie Monk. Released as the album's final single, "Always" achieved moderate commercial success, while critics praised the song's melody and production. The song can also be found on the band's 2005 compilation Greatest Hits.

== Background ==
The lyrics concern a narrator yearning to rekindle a failed romantic relationship. Tom DeLonge described the song as a "love song."

In an interview with MTV News, DeLonge explained the song and sarcastically addressed the lyrics of the choruses:

The song is about wanting to hold a chick all night long and kiss her and touch her and taste her and feel her and all these great adjectives. Verbs actually, there's some adjectives in there, but mostly verbs and nouns. Some pronouns too, but not too many of those.

== Composition ==
"Always" was written by bassist Mark Hoppus, drummer Travis Barker, and guitarist Tom DeLonge, while sung by DeLonge and Hoppus and produced by Jerry Finn. The song is composed in the key of B major and is set in the time signature of common time with a tempo of 158 beats per minute. The vocal range spans from A_{3} to D_{7}. Referred to as "the '80s song" during production, "Always" features an uptempo backbeat combined with a New Romantic-era keyboard, and pulls from new wave influences.

The song's heavily processed guitar textures exemplified DeLonge's newfound embrace of guitar effects. After largely avoiding pedals on earlier blink-182 albums, he incorporated flangers and chorus speakers into the recording, while stressing that the effects served to enhance the melody rather than become the song's defining feature. The song's outro features four separate bass guitar parts: Hoppus performs on a Fender Bass VI, two Fender Precision Bass tracks, and a Roland Synth Bass. Barker said he drew inspiration from the new wave band Missing Persons, aiming for a "super dry" 1980s-inspired drum sound. The arrangement features tightly recorded cymbals, rapid tambourine during the choruses, and prominent keyboard textures in the outro.

Journalist Joe Shooman pointed out that the song's central guitar riff is remescient of The Only Ones' "Another Girl, Another Planet" (1979). He called it "the thickest-textured Blink track of all-time," and acknowledged its tribute to 1980s synth-driven pop. Mike Rampton of Louder Sound described the song as "power-pop perfection". Andrew Sacher of BrooklynVegan felt that "Always" was the most "Cure-sounding song" on the album, rather than "All of This" which featured Robert Smith. Sacher noted the track as a "a truly sweet post-punk love song".

== Chart success and live history ==
"Always" was announced as the fourth and final single from Blink-182 in August 2004. "It's gonna change people's lives and might actually change the world forever," guitarist Tom DeLonge jokingly predicted. It was first serviced to radio in mid-November 2004. "Always" achieved moderate international chart success following its release. The song reached number 36 on the UK Singles Chart and peaked at number two on the UK Rock & Metal chart. Elsewhere, it charted at number 33 in Scotland, number 45 in Australia, and number 96 in Germany. In the United States, "Always" reached number 39 on Billboard's Modern Rock Tracks chart.

The song was only performed twice in its original release, prior to the band's "indefinite hiatus." It has nonetheless been performed regularly since the band's return.

== Reception ==
Critics have consistently ranked "Always" among blink-182's best songs, citing its emotional maturity, richly layered production, and successful fusion of pop-punk with 1980s new wave influences. A.D. Amorosi of The Philadelphia Inquirer, in his 2003 review of Blink-182, called the song "contagious." Consequence's Collin Brennan considered "Always" the standout track on Blink-182, writing that its blend of bubblegum hooks and '80s textures complemented DeLonge's portrayal of a narrator desperately trying to salvage a failing relationship. Matt Mitchell of Paste found "Always" to be blink-182's "best love song," arguing that its blend of new wave sounds showcased a more ambitious side of the band, more "textured and complex" than its earlier work. Writing for MTV News, Joe D'Angelo described "Always" as "a revved-up plea for making up after breaking up," while observing that it bore little resemblance to the band's earlier material.

Pranav Trewn of Stereogum viewed "Always" as one of blink-182's defining songs, arguing that Hoppus' melancholy songwriting—reminiscent of Robert Smith—was complemented by DeLonge's emotionally unrestrained vocal performance. Kerrang!'s Sam Law praised its "contagious" blend of layered synths, also calling it and one of DeLonge's strongest vocal performances. Law also argued that, despite its overt throwback energy, the song foreshadowed the direction of pop-punk in the years that followed.

== Music video ==
The song's music video features a unique split screen technique, seen here.

The music video for "Always" was directed by Joseph Kahn. The group shot it while on tour in Australia in mid-2004, at the same studio space used by the Wiggles. It features Australian pop singer Sophie Monk. The video is displayed as three horizontal panels, in which Monk flirts with DeLonge, Hoppus and Barker. However, the panels sever the onscreen participants in three. Monk appears as a fractured whole, while parts of the band members combine to make one character. The trio's characters attempt to plead with Monk, trying to repair a damaged relationship, which are depicted through fights, arguments, and "the occasional making-up/making-out," which is handled by Barker. In reference to the video, DeLonge said "It's like doing an algebraic formulation on paper when you watch it. It's the same kind of feeling [...] but it's rad."

Bassist Mark Hoppus called it the most technically complicated video the band ever had to shoot, as it required choreographed positioning in real time. Hoppus recalled that filming was physically demanding; during the opening take, he slipped on broken glass after a bottle was accidentally dropped on set. Despite the complexity of the production, he later described the finished video as "really genius" and praised Kahn's concept. The video was photographed by Brad Rushing and edited by David Blackburn who won the MVPA Best Editing Award for his work.

The video first premiered on MTV's Total Request Live on November 10, 2004. It was also made available online for Yahoo!'s LAUNCH platform the next day. The song was a hit on music video channels, where it was among the most-played on Fuse, MTV2 and MuchMusic into January 2005. Retrospective reviews have contrasted the visual styles of the album's four singles, describing the colorful aesthetic of "Always" as a deliberate counterpoint to the gothic imagery of "I Miss You", the frenetic energy of "Feeling This", and the sepia-toned look of "Down".

== Track listing ==
All tracks are written by Blink-182.

Always Single
No.	Title	Length
1.	"Always"	4:11
2.	"I Miss You" (Live in Minneapolis)	3:58
3.	"The Rock Show" (Live in Minneapolis)	3:37

- The two live tracks were originally broadcast live on The WB's Pepsi Smash concert series.

== Personnel ==
Per the Blink-182 liner notes.

Blink-182

- Tom DeLonge – guitars, vocals
- Mark Hoppus – bass guitar, Fender Bass VI, bass synthesizer, vocals
- Travis Barker – drums, cabasa, tambourine

Additional personnel

- Roger Joseph Manning, Jr. – keyboards

== Charts ==
Chart (2004)	Peak position
Australia (ARIA)	45
Germany (GfK)	96
Scottish Singles Sales (Official Charts)	33
UK Singles (Official Charts)	36
UK Rock & Metal (Official Charts)	2
US Modern Rock Tracks (Billboard)	39

== Certifications ==
Region	Certification	Certified units/sales
United Kingdom (BPI)	Silver	200,000^{‡}
^{‡} Sales+streaming figures based on certification alone.

== Release history ==
Country	Date	Format	Label	Ref.
United States	August 16, 2004	Alternative radio	Geffen	
United States	November 15, 2004	Alternative radio	Geffen	
