= Violence (Blink-182 song) =

2003 song by Blink-182

Song by Blink-182

from the album Blink-182
- Recorded: January–October 2003; The Rubin's House, Signature Sound, Rolling Thunder (San Diego, California); Conway Recording Studios (Hollywood, California)
- Genre: Emo
- Length: 3:40
- Label: Geffen
- Songwriters: Tom DeLonge; Mark Hoppus; Travis Barker
- Producer: Jerry Finn

"Violence" is a song by American rock band Blink-182. and is the fourth track of the band's 2003 self-titled fifth studio album. The song, written by guitarist Tom DeLonge, bassist Mark Hoppus and drummer Travis Barker, marks a departure from the band's earlier pop-punk sound. Lyrically, it equates interpersonal conflict with broader imagery of violence, while depicting the late-night wanderings of a femme-fatale figure. Musically, "Violence" features minimalistic, pulse-driven percussion, drone-like guitar riffs, spoken-word passages, and a jazz-inflected bridge.

Although not released as a single, the band produced a music video for the track, directed by photographer Estevan Oriol. Critics responded positively, noting the song's darker tone, layered instrumentation, and stylistic experimentation. Over time, "Violence" has become a recurring feature of Blink-182's live shows, and has been performed hundreds of times.

== Background ==
Blink-182, who rose to prominence at the turn of the 2000s with an uptempo and often irreverent pop-punk style, sought to broaden their musical approach during sessions for their fifth studio album in 2003, which the band ultimately left untitled to emphasize its stylistic break from prior work. Guitarist Tom DeLonge had been exploring post-hardcore and emo textures in the period leading up to the album, particularly through his side project Box Car Racer, with the Los Angeles band Failure among his reference points. Failure's 1996 album Fantastic Planet became especially significant; DeLonge discovered the record several years after its release and contacted the group's frontman Ken Andrews to discuss contributing to the new material. Andrews, who contributed additional guitar and keyboard layers to the song, later recalled that Blink-182 had been studying the structural and textural elements of Fantastic Planet—including its use of ambient segues—while shaping their own album.

DeLonge noted that while "Violence" contained elements reminiscent of the band's earlier material, it also featured "a lot of really deep, weird stuff" and was structured so that it "doesn’t sound like anything [they’ve] done before." The band mentioned that the writing and recording of the album took place amid global unrest, including the Iraq War. PopMatters journalist Mazzer D’Orazio observed that the anxiety of this period is reflected in "Violence", which "describes interactions with a paramour as 'She kills with no life to spare,' while 'victims' lay at her feet," noting that the song's imagery serves as an extended metaphor recurring elsewhere on the record.

== Composition ==
"Violence" illustrates the album's push into more adventurous musical territory, pairing stark rhythmic minimalism with spoken-word passages and atmospheric interludes. The track opens with finger snaps and a pulsing, heartbeat-like rhythm before a discordant guitar figure—built on a single repeated B-octave—introduces a drone-like tension. Its percussion incorporates snaps, shakers, and clave patterns, while the arrangement shifts between jagged punk passages and a smooth, almost jazz-inflected bridge. Lyrically, DeLonge sketches a femme-fatale figure entering a bar—"long hair that blows side to side"—while the song as a whole juxtaposes broken relationships with imagery of global conflict. The bridge contains a buried, spoken-word letter by Mark Hoppus, adding another textural layer.

Producer Jerry Finn completed the song's original mix, which appears on the "Feeling This" 7-inch single; the album's final mix was handled by Andy Wallace. Although "Violence" was not released as an official single, the band shot a video for the track—alongside one for "Stockholm Syndrome"—with Los Angeles photographer and director Estevan Oriol, and included both videos as bonus material on the album's enhanced CD.

== Reception ==
Critical reception of "Violence" has been generally positive, with critics highlighting its tone, complex textures, and stylistic departure. Dave Simpson from The Guardian called the song a "darker shade of pop-punk." Jenny Eliscu complimented the song in her Rolling Stone review of the album, highlighting its "shriek of buzz-saw guitar" and "revved-up punk throttle." Trevor Kelley of Alternative Press described "Violence" as "downright epic, blending screamo thrash with dreamy prog and the sort of catchy chorus‑driven punk that gets you every time." Writing for the now-defunct music magazine Blender, critic Jonah Weiner observed that on the song, DeLonge pushes his "punk-brat singsong into a frayed shout—not screamo, but close," resulting in what he described as "a lean, thrilling run through adolescent hopelessness." In a more critical assessment, Roy Edroso of the Village Voice characterized the track less favorably, remarking that "the disc's only miss trails off of 'Violence's spring-shooting fuzz lead." Ian Cohen in Uproxx found it comical that the song equates "getting ignored by a woman you can’t have to actual violence."

In a retrospective review for Stereogum, critic Chris Payne praised the band's performance on "Violence", highlighting drummer Travis Barker's "Tasmanian Devil" intensity as well as Tom DeLonge's heavy guitar work. In an overview for the Riot Fest website, writer David Anthony noted that "Violence"'s "go-for-broke, stadium-ready chorus" contrasts with its unorthodox rhythms and textures. He also praised Hoppus's backing vocals on the song, opining that he "inject[s] a kind of joyless misery that could pass for Ian Curtis at his most disaffected."

== Live performances ==
"Violence" has become a concert staple for the band. According to aggregated concert statistics on setlist.fm, "Violence" has been performed live by blink‑182 over 400 times in concert set lists across their career, making it one of their frequently played songs despite not being a major single. When performed, "Violence" has often been preceded by an extended drum intro from Barker.

== Personnel ==
Personnel adapted from Blink-182 CD liner notes

Blink-182

- Mark Hoppus – vocals, bass guitar
- Tom DeLonge – vocals, guitar
- Travis Barker – drums

Additional personnel

- Ken Andrews – additional guitars and keyboards

Production

- Jerry Finn – producer
- Andy Wallace – mix engineer
- Brian Gardner – mastering engineer
