= I'm Lost Without You (disambiguation) =

"I'm Lost Without You" is a song by Blink-182.

I'm Lost Without You may also refer to:

- "I'm Lost Without You", a 1945 song by Al Dexter
- "I'm Lost Without You", a 1965 song by Billy Fury

== See also ==
- Lost Without You (disambiguation)
