= Bandleader =

Leader of a band of musicians

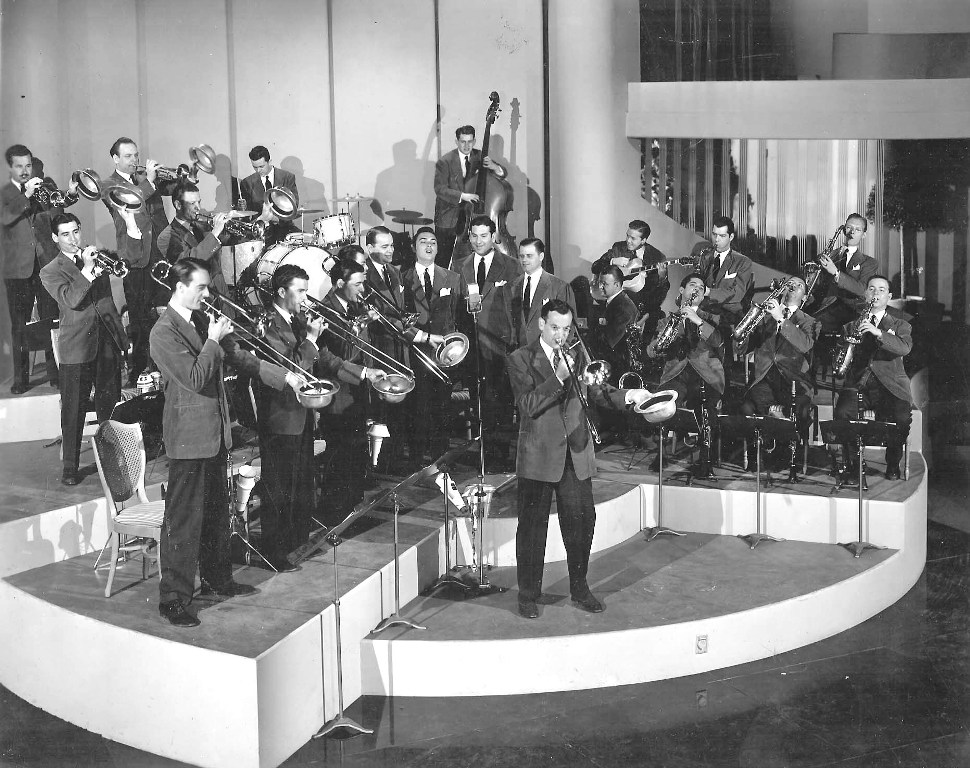
The Glenn Miller Orchestra, led by Glenn Miller (front and center)

A bandleader is the leader of a music group such as a dance band, rock or pop band or jazz quartet. The term is most commonly used with a group that plays popular music as a small combo or a big band, such as one which plays jazz, blues, rhythm and blues or rock and roll music. Most bandleaders are also performers with their own band, either as singers or as instrumentalists, playing an instrument such as electric guitar, piano, or other instruments.

== Roles ==
The bandleader must have a variety of musical skills. A bandleader needs to be a music director who chooses the "setlist" (the list of songs that will be played in a show), sets the tempo for each song and starts each song (often by "counting in"), leads the start of new sections of songs (e.g., signalling for the start of a guitar solo or drum solo) and leads the endings of each song. The bandleader is also onstage with the group, so they have to be a strong performer on lead vocals or an instrument. The bandleader also needs to have a good general knowledge of the different parts played by all the rhythm section instruments (guitar, keyboards, electric bass, drum kit) and solo instruments (e.g., lead guitar, saxophone, etc.), as they have to audition prospective new members of the band and lead rehearsals. The bandleader also typically selects new songs for the group, particularly if the group is a cover band or a tribute band. In some cases, the bandleader may manage other aspects of the band, such as organizing tours and sound recording sessions. Some bandleaders are also composers and songwriters for their group.

Often the bands are named after their bandleaders, or the backing band is given its own name, distinct from the bandleader (e.g., Bruce Springsteen and the E Street Band or Elvis Costello and The Attractions). Some older bands such as The Count Basie Orchestra have continued operating under their bandleaders' names long after the death of the original bandleader.

== See also ==
- Bandmaster
- Lead vocalist – often the leader of their musical group in genres such as rock and pop
