= Violent Storm (disambiguation) =

Violent Storm or Violent Storms may refer to:

== Weather ==
- Violent storm, a category used in classifying weather severity under the Beaufort scale
- Violent storms, a type of severe weather

== Arts, entertainment, media ==
- Violent Storm, a 1993 videogame, an arcade sidescroller
- Violent Storm (band)
- "Violent Storm", a 2024 song and single by Cemetery Skyline

== See also ==
- Violence (disambiguation)
- Storm (disambiguation)
