= Violence (disambiguation) =

Violence is the use of physical force to cause injury, damage, or death.

Violence or The Violence may also refer to:

== Film ==
- Violence (1947 film), an American film noir
- Violence (1955 film), a Swedish drama film
- Violence (2025 film), a Canadian crime thriller film

== Music ==
=== Performers ===
- Vio-lence, an American thrash metal band
- Violence (musician), American electronic musician

=== Albums ===
- Violence (Editors album) or the title song, 2018
- Violence (Nothingface album), 2000
- The Violence (album), by Darren Hayman, or the title song, 2012
- Violence, by Tear Out the Heart, 2013

=== Songs ===
- "Violence" (Grimes and i_o song), 2019
- "Violence" (Blink-182 song), 2003
- "The Violence", by Rise Against, 2017
- "Violence", by Against Me! from Searching for a Former Clarity, 2005
- "Violence", by Beach Bunny from Tunnel Vision, 2025
- "Violence", by Living Sacrifice from Living Sacrifice, 1991
- "Violence", by Mott the Hoople from Mott, 1973
- "Violence", by Pet Shop Boys from Please, 1986
- "The Violence", by Asking Alexandria from Like a House on Fire, 2020
- "The Violence", by Childish Gambino from Atavista, 2024
- "Violence (Enough Is Enough)", by A Day to Remember from Common Courtesy, 2013

== Other uses ==
- Violence (horse) (foaled 2010), an American thoroughbred racehorse
- Violence (role-playing game), a role-playing game by Greg Costikyan
- Violence, a 1992 novel by Richard Bausch
- Violence: Six Sideways Reflections, a 2008 book by Slavoj Žižek

== See also ==
- La Violencia, a 1948–1958 civil war in Colombia
