= Down (Blink-182 song) =

Single by Blink-182

from the album Blink-182
- Released: May 10, 2004
- Recorded: 2003
- Genre: New wave; power pop
- Length: 3:03
- Label: Geffen
- Songwriters: Tom DeLonge; Mark Hoppus; Travis Barker
- Producer: Jerry Finn

Blink-182 singles chronology
"I Miss You" (2004)	"Down" (2004)	"Always" (2004)

"Down" is a song by the American rock band Blink-182, released to radio on May 10, 2004, as the third single from the group's 2003 untitled album. The track shares writing credits between guitarist Tom DeLonge, bassist Mark Hoppus, and drummer Travis Barker, with DeLonge serving as its primary composer. DeLonge conceived the song around a vivid mental image of a couple in a car during rainfall. The song explores the tension between desire and uncertainty in relationships. Built around a moody atmosphere, the song layers electronic elements with a discordant guitar riff, piano textures, and drum and bass influence. The song was produced by Jerry Finn.

"Down" was released as a single in May 2004 and saw moderate international chart success, performing strongest in North America and the United Kingdom. It peaked at number 10 on Billboard's Modern Rock Tracks chart. The song's music video, directed by Estevan Oriol, features a gritty, gang-inflected aesthetic. It shows Blink-182 performing at a house party while police search and pursue a dangerous gang member through Los Angeles.

== Background ==
"Down" was developed while the band was recording their 2003 untitled album. Guitarist and vocalist Tom DeLonge conceived the song from a vivid, cinematic idea of a couple sitting in a car during heavy rain, with emotions and desire building as they struggle to express romantic interest that is not fully returned. The track centers on themes of longing within a relationship, framed by a moody, rain-soaked sonic atmosphere. The original version of "Down" ran over six minutes long, and contained a drum and bass breakdown from drummer Travis Barker. Rumors circulated following the song's release that DeLonge penned the track on experiences with a previous girlfriend.

It is one of the few Blink-182 songs to feature vocal contributions from Travis Barker, who provides the whispered lines before the choruses.

== Reception ==
A reviewer for E! called the song "touchingly sincere."

== Release and live performances ==
"Down" was issued as a single in May 2004; it first impacted alternative radio stations beginning on May 10 in the United States. The band promoted the release with tour dates featuring Cypress Hill and on a nationwide tour with No Doubt. The band performed the song on the Late Show with David Letterman on May 27, 2004. The song was released in the United Kingdom on June 21, 2004.

"Down" achieved moderate international chart success. Domestically, the song peaked at number 10 on the Billboard Modern Rock Tracks chart during the week of July 31, 2004, but quickly falling off afterward. In the United Kingdom, the song reached number 24 on the UK Singles Chart and number 25 on the Scottish Singles Chart. It also appeared on the UK Airplay Chart, peaking at number 27. Elsewhere in Europe, "Down" charted in the lower regions of the sales charts for Austria and Germany. In Oceania, the single reached number 35 on the Australian ARIA Singles Chart and number 32 in New Zealand.

"Down" was one of few Blink-182 songs performed by Tom DeLonge's next band, Angels & Airwaves. During an August 2009 concert in Hartford, CT, the band dedicated the song to Adam Goldstein (DJ AM), who had died the night before following a drug overdose.

== Music video ==
The song's music video was directed by Estevan Oriol. The song first made its premiere on Yahoo!'s LAUNCH platform on May 25, 2004, with it later receiving its television debut on MTV on June 2, 2004. In the clip, Blink-182 are playing a house party when the police arrive and search for a gang member named Trouble, who slips away immediately. The cops, fronted by a lead policeman played by actor Terry Crews, unsuccessfully chase Trouble on foot, in cars, and in helicopters throughout South Central Los Angeles, but he evades their capture in the concrete L.A. River. The party scene features over 100 former gang members; these performers were signed to Suspect Entertainment, a company founded to provide a safe, legal alternative to joining such groups. The video was shot on April 19, 2004.

== Track listing ==
All tracks are written by Blink-182.

Down Single CD 1
No.	Title	Length
1.	"Down" (Single Version)	3:12
2.	"I Miss You" (James Guthrie Mix)	4:38
3.	"Down" (Video)	3:32

Down Single CD 2
No.	Title	Length
1.	"Down" (Single Version)	3:14
2.	"Down" (T.L.A. Arrangement)	3:40
3.	"Down" (Multimedia Track)	3:21
4.	"Blink Behind the Scenes" (video)	5:00

Down Single 7-inch Picture Disc
No.	Title	Length
1.	"Down" (Album Version)	3:12

- T.L.A. stands for Tom Lord-Alge
- Side 2 of the Picture Disc contains artwork and information, not music
- The "behind the scenes" video is the same one featured on the "Blink-182" Tour Edition DVD and the "Greatest Hits" Deluxe DVD

== Personnel ==
Blink-182

- Mark Hoppus - bass guitar, vocals
- Tom DeLonge - guitar, vocals
- Travis Barker - drums, backing vocals

Additional musicians

- Roger Joseph Manning, Jr. - keyboards

== Charts ==
=== Weekly charts ===
Weekly chart performance for "Down"
Chart (2004)	Peak position
Australia (ARIA)	35
Austria (Ö3 Austria Top 40)	59
Germany (GfK)	76
New Zealand (Recorded Music NZ)	32
Scotland Singles (OCC)	25
UK Singles (OCC)	24
UK Airplay (Music Week)	27
US Alternative Airplay (Billboard)	10

=== Year-end charts ===
Year-end chart performance for "Down"
Chart (2004)	Position
US Modern Rock Tracks (Billboard)	58

== Release history ==
Release dates and formats for "Down"
Country	Date	Format	Label	Ref.
United States	May 10, 2004	Alternative radio	Geffen	
