= Blink-182 (album) =

2003 album by Blink-182

Studio album by Blink-182
- Released: November 18, 2003
- Recorded: December 2002 – September 2003
- Studios: The Rubins' House; Signature Sound; Rolling Thunder (all San Diego); Conway Recording (Hollywood)
- Genres: Alternative rock; pop-punk; post-hardcore; emo; new wave
- Length: 49:16
- Label: Geffen
- Producers: Jerry Finn; Sick Jacken

Blink-182 chronology
Take Off Your Pants and Jacket (2001)	Blink-182 (2003)	Greatest Hits (2005)

Blink-182 studio chronology
Take Off Your Pants and Jacket (2001)	Blink-182 (2003)	Neighborhoods (2011)

Singles from Blink-182
- 1. "Feeling This" Released: October 6, 2003; 2. "I Miss You" Released: February 3, 2004; 3. "Down" Released: June 22, 2004; 4. "Always" Released: November 2, 2004

Blink-182 (also referred to as the untitled album) is the fifth studio album by American rock band Blink-182, released on November 18, 2003, by Geffen Records. Following the blockbuster success of their last two albums, Enema of the State and Take Off Your Pants and Jacket, the trio went on hiatus and participated in various side projects including Box Car Racer and Transplants. When they regrouped, they decided to approach their next album by placing more attention on song structure and expand musical arrangements. Their longest album, it marks a shift toward a darker, more expansive and complex sound; its interconnected songs and cinematic structure blur the lines between pop-punk and post-hardcore.

The recording process for the album began in a rented San Diego mansion and evolved into a costly project spanning over a year, two record labels, and more than a million dollars. The band, led by producer Jerry Finn, transformed the house into a fully equipped "musical laboratory," using an extensive array of vintage gear, experimental instruments, and unconventional analog techniques. Its songwriting is more personal in nature and explores mature territory, touching upon the realities of adulthood and unexpected hardships, as well as personal growth and global unrest. Its ambiguous title embraces a serious, undefined identity, complemented by cover art introducing an iconographic "smiley" logo inspired by edgy pop art and punk aesthetics. The album features a gothic collaboration with Robert Smith of The Cure.

Released at the forefront of the emo cultural peak, the album proved successful, selling 2.2 million copies in the United States. It received positive reviews, with critics welcoming its change in tone. Lead singles "Feeling This" and "I Miss You" received the most radio airplay out of the four singles released, and peaked high on Billboard charts. The worldwide touring schedule, which saw the band travel to Japan and Australia, also found the three performing for U.S. military troops stationed in the Middle East. The album was the band's last recording with longtime producer Jerry Finn and their final original material before their first breakup. The band and critics alike regard the LP as a highlight; it was celebrated with sold-out anniversary performances a decade after its release.

== Background ==
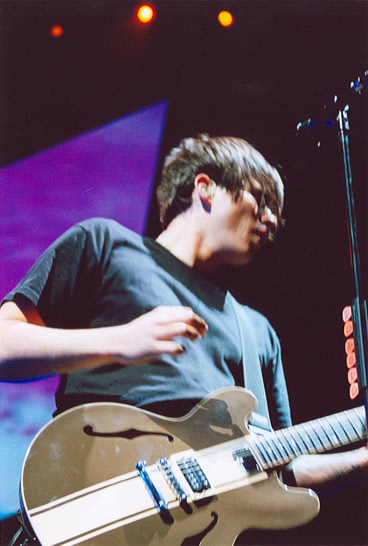
Prior to the album's recording, guitarist and vocalist Tom DeLonge explored post-hardcore influences with side-project Box Car Racer.

After a decade of touring and making music, Blink-182 had reached a breaking point. The trio—guitarist Tom Delonge, bassist Mark Hoppus, and drummer Travis Barker—had seen their lives change dramatically as their band reached superstar levels of fame. Their fourth album, Take Off Your Pants and Jacket (2001), had gone multi-platinum just as its predecessor, and throughout 2002 they co-headlined with genre forebears Green Day in arenas and amphitheaters across North America. Beneath the surface, however, relations were becoming strained. They became conflicted on their goofy, nudist public image, and Hoppus and DeLonge began to clash creatively, with DeLonge striving for a heavier sound. The close bond between the once dynamic duo was fracturing with age: in his memoir, Hoppus observes that "[formerly] outgoing and boisterous, [Tom] became increasingly private and secretive," while acknowledging there was an emerging rivalry between their wives. Barker felt these dynamics change as the three all got married: "Blink-182 were no longer just three inseparable guys who were touring together." Later, Barker began dating model Shanna Moakler, inviting tabloid attention, adding to the "awkwardness" present in the band. All three men became fathers between 2002 and 2003, further hastening the onset of more adult responsibilities. The September 11 attacks put an end to any immediate touring plans, leading to a brief gap in their frenetic schedule.

Over the break, DeLonge began to suffer from significant back pain due to a herniated disc, and had privately become discontented by the constraints placed by the record label and the band's signature sound, which was becoming popularized elsewhere. He felt a desire to broaden his musical palette, and channeled these frustrations into an album, Box Car Racer, inspired by post-hardcore bands like Fugazi and Refused. Blink producer Jerry Finn naturally returned to engineer, and DeLonge, ostensibly trying to avoid paying a session player, invited Barker to record drums—making Hoppus the odd man out. It marked a major rift in their friendship: while DeLonge claimed he was not intentionally omitted, Hoppus nonetheless felt betrayed. "At the end of 2001, it felt like Blink-182 had broken up. It wasn't spoken about, but it felt over", said Hoppus later. With A&R representatives from MCA Records eager to market a new band by the guitarist, this new band, called Box Car Racer, quickly evolved into a full-fledged side project, launching two national tours throughout 2002. The relationship between Hoppus and DeLonge had a low point, introducing a chasm in their chemistry present from that moment on: "The message was clear: Tom thought I held him back from greatness. It didn’t feel like we were best friends trying to conquer the world together anymore."

The trio reportedly had "hundreds of discussions" on the issue, seemingly putting the conflict to rest. Over the years, however, they acknowledged that the tension never truly disappeared—it lingered beneath the surface. By the end of 2002, the band were preparing to reconvene to record another album. The heavier sound of Box Car Racer inspired the change in tone and experimental nature the band approached Blink-182 with. Hoppus described his desire for the album to experiment with different arrangements in a 2002 interview: "Before, we got one guitar sound that we changed a little bit through the record. This time we want to try a whole different setup for each song." Hoppus recalled that Barker entered the production process by urging the band to "[not think of the album] as the next Blink-182 record — think of it as the first Blink-182 record." "Once the door was opened by Tom and Travis with Box Car Racer, Mark started to be more on board with that concept. He was also more flexible and the next Blink album was able to be a pretty big departure from the previous two", said assistant engineer Sam Boukas. "Box Car Racer opened the door in that sense and I think the three of them wanted to be more creative and have more creative liberty on that next album." Meanwhile, Barker also extended his love of hip-hop into the rap rock outfit Transplants, a collaboration with Rancid's Tim Armstrong.

== Recording and production ==
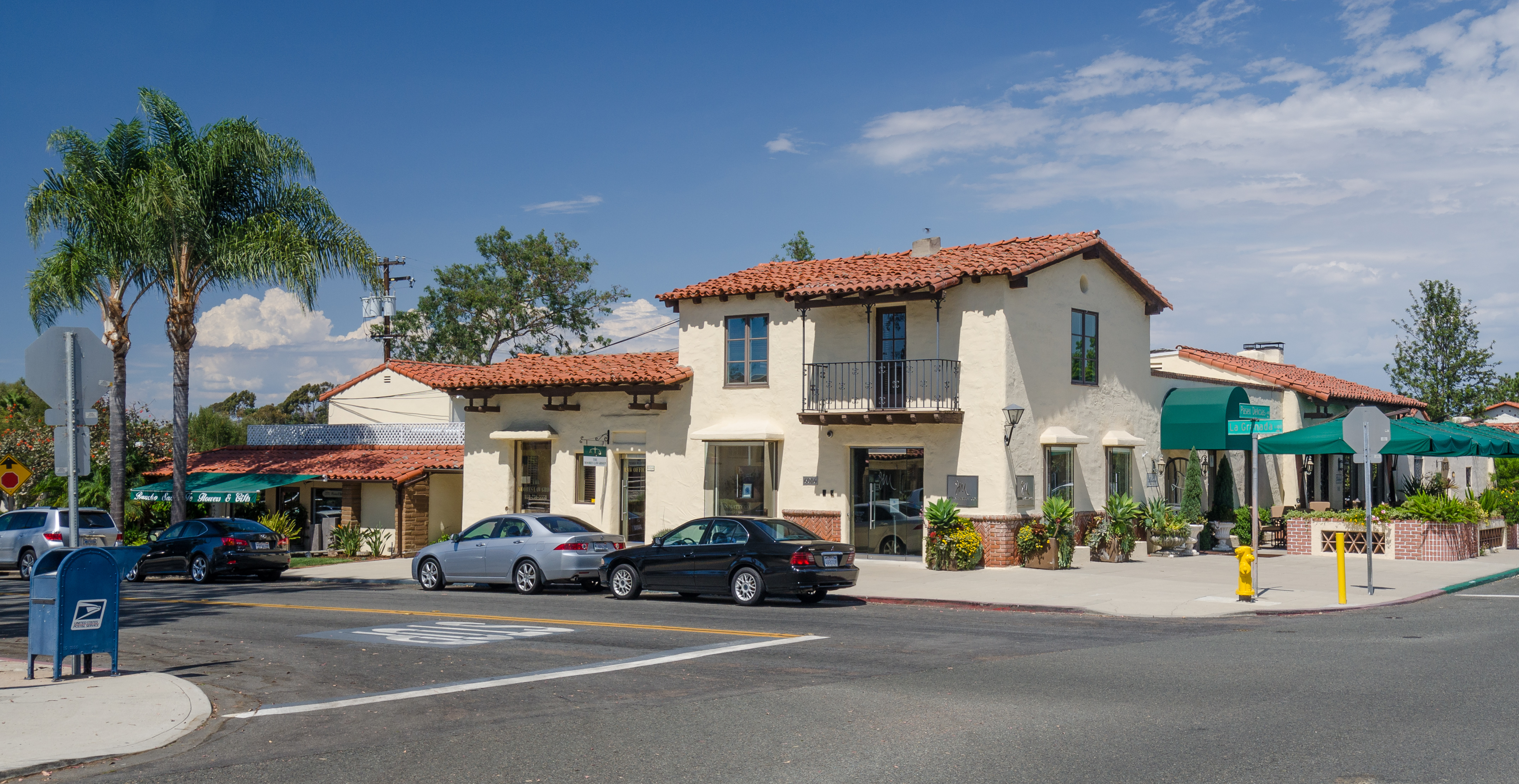
Street view of Rancho Santa Fe, California.

Blink-182 was recorded at several studios throughout 2003, but the initial plan started with a house. In January 2003, the band rented a mansion in the San Diego luxury community of Rancho Santa Fe, planning to record the entire album there. DeLonge had grown weary of booking studio time, and the house was a way to shake things up, as well as preserving a normal family lifestyle. He partnered with a local realtor who found them a gated villa in the suburb. Hoppus acknowledged the absurdity of their position: "It's happened so many times it’s a rock 'n' roll cliché. A band gets more than a decade deep into their career and ends up spending way too much time and money in the studio laboring over their magnum opus," he joked. The entire home was retrofitted as a provisional recording facility, and the windows were temporarily soundproofed.

Jerry Finn, the band's go-to producer, returned to guide the process, in what would be his final collaboration with the band. Ryan Hewitt, renowned for his work with Red Hot Chili Peppers and U2, was the main engineer behind the album. Hoppus and DeLonge lived nearby; Barker, unwilling to leave Moakler, would drive from Los Angeles to San Diego each day. For the engineers, it was even easier: Hewitt and Finn simply moved into the temporary recording setup. In addition to the home being converted into a studio, pay-per-view pornography was on continuous play; the band found it outlandish and opulent to have on in the background. After some time, the family who owned the property got a bill from the cable provider for thousands of dollars in erotica rentals. Meanwhile, the band used the garage as space for other purposes; namely, to "smoke hella weed". DeLonge commented: "If I wasn't smoking half of Colombia I probably ran up $3 million in adult film charges." The in-studio antics were recorded and posted on the official band website throughout the year, as well in the documentary series MTV Album Launch.

Creatively, the trio set out to completely reinvent their approach to songwriting from the ground up. They ditched their typical previous recording process (writing and demoing several songs and recording them in a studio one instrument at a time) and instead approached each song together. They worked on multiple songs each day, building each with a minute attention to detail, moving on to another when creatively spent. The band stated that taking their time in the studio gave them the luxury of experimenting with different methods of writing, playing, and recording. The band recorded at the home until April 2003, when the owners of the house "kicked them out." At that point, the band had been working for sixty days and only had two finished songs. They continued working at other facilities around San Diego, like Signature Sound and Rolling Thunder, until they ran out of time. Looking for a change of scenery, they moved operations to Los Angeles' Conway Recording Studios—one of Finn's favorite locales. DeLonge and Hoppus stayed at the W Hotel with their families during recording, which only added to the record's increasingly large budget.

Altogether, the recording period of the album, as well its mixing and mastering, lasted from January to October 2003. Previous Blink-182 sessions were recorded in three months. Though the band had their share of arguments in the past, making the album was a positive experience. Despite lingering friction due to Box Car, Hoppus and DeLonge got along during the process, discovering their chemistry was still intact. "We'd put the animosity behind us and were of one mind again, united in our desire to make something special," Hoppus recalled, observing that he and his partner "were back to encouraging each other’s creativity and helping one another with ideas." He was reportedly was originally conflicted on the new direction, but felt the goal of illustrating more depth to the band was achieved: "We needed to prove that there was something deeper than [...] the dudes that ran naked in the video," he said. For Barker, he later considered it his favorite time in the band's history, commenting, "That was a good time in my life," he reminisced some time later: "That's by far my favorite album we did." Hewitt concurred: "it was one of the best times I've had making a record," he told Tape Op.

=== Collaborations ===
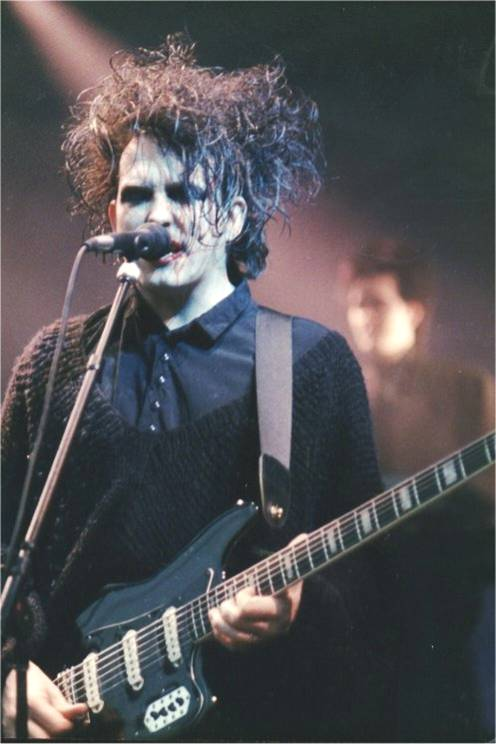
The album features a collaboration with Robert Smith of The Cure.

The album features a large array of collaborators, in a first for the band. During the process, the band partnered with DJ Shadow and Dan the Automator; Barker recorded "The Fallen Interlude" with producer Sick Jacken, of the gangsta rap group Psycho Realm. A planned collaboration with the Neptunes never came to fruition. Barker noted that a planned collaboration with N.E.R.D., a spinoff of the Neptunes, involved reciprocal guest appearances—he would contribute to their record while they would feature on a Blink-182 release. The collaboration ultimately never materialized. The band also asked Ken Andrews, frontman of the band Failure, to contribute to its songs at his choosing. Andrews ended up adding guitars and keyboards to "Obvious" and "Violence".

The band also collaborated with The Cure frontman Robert Smith on "All of This". It was a dream come true for Hoppus, who had been significantly influenced by The Cure as a kid; he even donned eyeliner and red lipstick like Smith during high school. The team sent Smith the bed track of the tune in hopes he would contribute; Smith obliged and recorded his parts in England. The three initially believed their legitimacy would be in question due to the goofy nature of their earlier work, to which Smith responded, "Nobody knows what kind of songs you are going to write in the future and nobody knows the full potential of any band. I really like the music you sent me."

=== Technical ===
On the technical side, Hoppus described the studio as a "musical laboratory": over 70 guitars, 30 amps, "30 or 40" different snare drums, up to six drum kits, and various keyboards and pianos were used in the album's production, many of which came from Finn's personal collection. Hoppus played a vintage Vox bass guitar that was purchased from a shop in Liverpool where the Beatles had bought their gear, as well as a Roland synth bass on "Always". More unusual instrumentation was also present: the band toyed with turntables, harmonium organs, Polynesian Gamelan bells, and a polyphonic tape replay keyboard. Many songs used unusual mic techniques. One example is the song "Stockholm Syndrome", which was recorded using a microphone dating to the 1950s, and the reverb on the vocals was achieved by playing the recordings into a shower. The drum fills for the song were recorded separately than the rest of the tracks, with the tape machines "sped up and super compressed", then played back at normal speed, to sound really "deep and gigantic". Similarly, on "Asthenia", the intro was achieved by recording the guitar through a failing Leslie speaker with a blown-out tube for excessive noise and scratchiness.

When recording at the house, the trio partnered with Signature Sound, the space where they had tracked their previous records, to rent a vintage API mixing console to install in the residence. Finn remained insistent in acquiring great sound; he initially insisted on tracking to tape, and ran cables in criss-cross patterns on the floor to avoid any interference. Tapes were run on a Studer 827 tape recorder, and they also used a Neve BCM10 secondary console (or "sidecar"). Hewitt noted that everything was mostly recorded on two-inch tape, with only vocals and keyboards recorded into Pro Tools HD for ease. He also said that they had to work around the home's natural limitations as a studio: "There were parallel walls. There were all kinds of weird reflections going on. But we just used it to our advantage or tamed problems and made everything work. I'm really proud of the sounds that are on that record because it was a lot of work to get them."

As opposed to recording all drum tracks using the same setup and mic technique, each song uses a different setup. Barker would often turn on a click track and simply play, and many songs originated from his drum beats, in a reverse of a typical songwriting process. Barker would often record a 4/4 base track and a half-time version, to have two working versions of each song, leading to interesting segues, like the transition between "Easy Target" and "All of This". The drums for "Easy Target" were recorded entirely separately – snare, hi-hat, toms, crash cymbals, and so on – for a uniquely disorienting effect: "to purposely confuse people." Barker pulled from his experience touring with Transplants, where he recorded each drum separately in his bus due to a lack of studio space. Several songs sound like they were made on an electronic kit but were simply Barker's bass drum and a Ribbon Crasher, recorded in unusual ways. Hewitt praised the band's musicianship—"they played every note of that record on tape," he said—and was pleased overall with the space: “The drum sounds are probably better than any drum sounds I’ve gotten in a studio. It’s such a big room, and there are hallways leading off in all different directions so we can mic those and get really great sounds,” he said.

Hoppus described the band's experimental approach in his memoir:

We trucked in a studio's worth of gear. Jerry set up a soundboard in one of the guest rooms. The main living area became the drum room. Cases crowded the entryway. Cables ran along the sides of hallways. Instruments and drums and pedals and microphones everywhere. […] He brought in rack after rack of vintage gear, and we spent days getting the most subtle sounds just right. We had a whole room filled with different snare drums for Travis to try out. We spent entire days on guitar sounds, working out every possible combination of equipment—different guitars, different strings, different cabinets, different heads, different microphones, different microphone placements. We spent three hours just comparing the sounds between different cables. [...] Sometimes we worked for eight hours on a few brief seconds’ worth of guitar parts.

== Post-production and budget ==
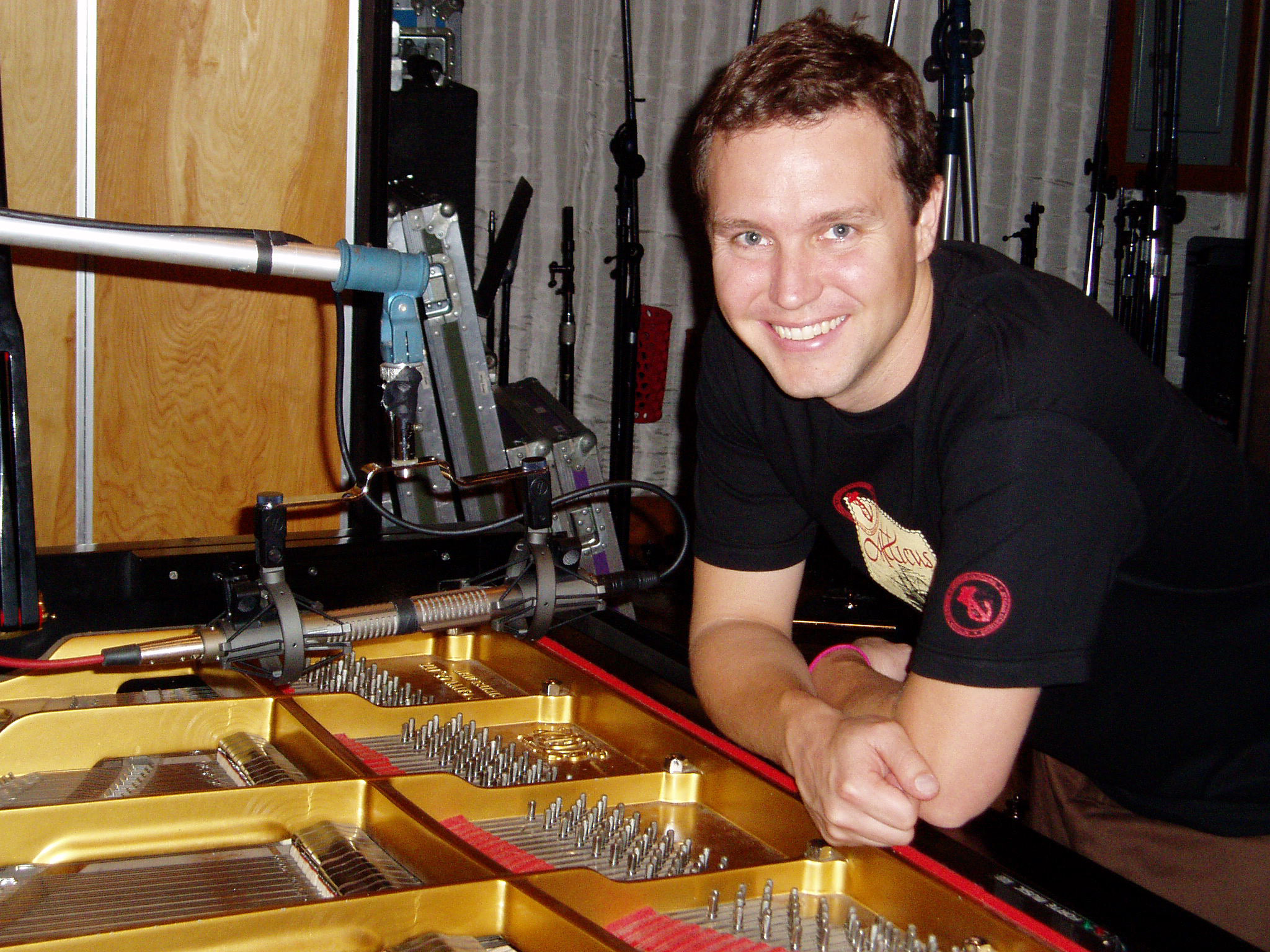
Bassist Mark Hoppus beside a grand piano while finalizing the album at Conway Recording Studios in September 2003.

Blink-182 was far more expensive than previous albums by the band, with its budget spiraling out of control across its nearly yearlong development. The album ended up costing over one million dollars to produce. It was the band's first release on Geffen Records, which absorbed sister label MCA in 2003. Prior to it dissolving, MCA had attempted to penalize the band for breaking stipulations in their contract that they would have an album out by a specific quarter. MCA had previously rushed the band into recording Take Off Your Pants and Jacket. At one point, MCA president Jay Boberg called for a band meeting to put pressure on them to speed things up. The trio met at the label headquarters and told Boberg in no uncertain terms that they would work at their own pace, after which he relented. Some months later, Boberg left the company as it was absorbed into Geffen, whose management were more comfortable with their relaxed pace.

The band were pleased with this freedom they received with Geffen. "Geffen came down and heard three songs and they said, 'This is the best record you've ever done, this is the record of your career, take as much time as you want, call us when it's done,'" DeLonge stated. "It just completely outlined the perspective of putting accounting before creative, and when you're in the entertainment business, you've got to put creative first. It's an art, you've got to look at it like an art, treat it like an art, and then you'll get the best product in the long run." But that leisurely pace came at a caveat: the release date kept getting missed and pushed back to the point where Jordan Schur, then-president of Geffen, made calls asking, "What is the absolute last possible second that we can turn this thing in and still make our release date?" DeLonge described the final days of mixing the album as "crazy stressful", with "literally hours to turn [the album] to have it come it out on time." Robert Smith took a significant amount of time recording his part: "We were literally hours from having to turn [the masters] in to the factory when it showed up," said DeLonge. The album was in production so late that final mixes were still being judged by Hoppus, DeLonge, and Barker the night before the album was sent to the pressing plant.

When it came time to mix the album, the budget rapidly escalated due to their insistence on making each track sonically distinct. They enlisted a murderer's row of top-shelf mix engineers, including Finn, Hewitt, Andy Wallace, and Tom Lord-Alge. "At one point we were paying for seven different studios to mix and overnight CDs back and forth," Hoppus said. Barker brought in a copy of Pink Floyd's The Wall as reference, and the band sent mixes to James Guthrie, who engineered The Wall. Ken Andrews also provided uncredited mixing work.

== Composition ==
=== Music and style ===
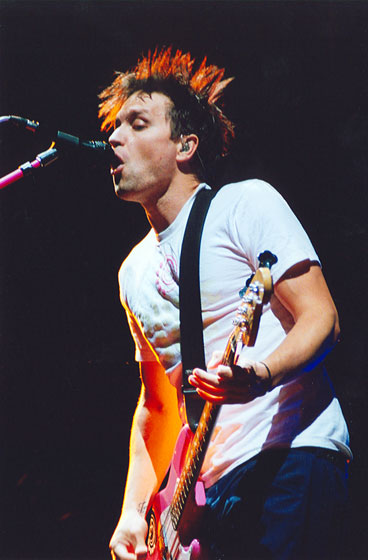
Bassist and vocalist Mark Hoppus considered his lyricism on Untitled his most personal to that point.

While still rooted in pop-punk, Untitled finds the band expanding their sonic template with darker, more restless songs and off-kilter hooks. All three members felt encumbered by the standard 4/4 punk pattern and had a desire to expand. Hoppus later described the album as a turning point in his bass playing, shifting away from traditional punk rock patterns toward more rhythmically complex parts that complemented Barker's drumming. The compositions on the record have been described as musically diverse and "borderline experimental." "Much of the punk has been dissolved, the buzzsaw guitars faded into the corners, allowing room for staggering dynamics, cathartic guitar bursts and a weightier, more experimental and ambitious sound", wrote Tom Bryant of Kerrang!. In an interview with MTV Album Launch, Hoppus said that the desired effect of the album was for people to listen to it and say, "Wait a minute...that's Blink-182?" Ben Wener, of the Milwaukee Journal Sentinel, described the composition of the album as "expansive, downcast, and sometimes spectral."

The album's general sound has been variously categorized as pop-punk, alternative rock, emo, new wave, post-hardcore and scene music. It additionally pulls from concepts like New Romanticism, gothic pop, jangle pop, post-punk and power pop. Kelefa Sanneh, writing for The New York Times, considered that the album may have been influenced by the growing presence of emo pop. Reflecting on the album, DeLonge cited influences from bands such as Queen, the Police, and the Cure that had long been part of the group's musical tastes but had rarely surfaced on earlier releases. One of the primary musical influences on the album was Failure's 1996 album Fantastic Planet, which is why they asked the band's leader, Ken Andrews, to collaborate with them. Another influence on the trio was the expansive sound of Bad Astronaut's Houston: We Have a Drinking Problem (2002).

=== Lyrics ===
"I think the second half of the record being written in LA was key. [In] San Diego [...] It's very beautiful and rich and everything I don't want to see when I'm writing a record, not a punk rock record [...] Being in Los Angeles, the heart of fucking street bombs to drug dealers to pimps to fucking gang bangers, that gives you inspiration. Like me sitting in fucking San Diego seeing rich people drive their nice cars and go to their nice houses doesn't do shit for me."

— Travis Barker on the recording process

The goal for Untitled was continuity: each song develops lyrically like chapters in a book, and songs segue into one another to present a cohesive feel instead of a regular collection of tracks. Barker envisioned the album like a "mini-movie". The album abandons the band's sunnier disposition and humor for weightier, dramatic prose. Themes include growing up and dealing with the realities of adulthood, including relationship woes, daily pressures, and unexpected hardships. The album is lyrically consumed with sorrow and uncertainty about the world. Entertainment Weekly interpreted it as a concept album based on a dying relationship, a "self-meditation on romantic decay." Frequently, publications remarked with incredulity at the band's "newfound" maturity. "We wanted to be different," remarked DeLonge. "Some of our fans were probably like, 'Fuck, maybe they should stop joking so people could hear why I like this band.' And I think this record is going to help those kids out."

Lyrics continue to be autobiographical, but the band took more time than usual on their writing. DeLonge would routinely rewrite his sections upwards of four times. "I think at this point in our career, we've evolved our way of thinking as far as songwriting", DeLonge told Billboard in reference to the more refined lyricism. Hoppus, in his interview with the Milwaukee Journal Sentinel, described the lyrics as the most personal he had written to that point. While past recordings tended to meditate on feelings from high school, the band felt it was akin to a safety net and desired to write about "what's going on [...] right now." Barker occasionally gave input on lyrical decisions as well for the first time. Some of the subject matter was inspired by lifestyle changes—the band members all became fathers before the album was released. The glum mood of the album was partially inspired by the 9/11 and the onset of the Iraq War. The mood was unsettling for DeLonge, whose brother is a Navy officer: "It was so weird because we'd all be glued to the TV, watching these bombs explode over another country. So I'd see all this and wonder where he was at, and then we'd have to go into the next room and sing or finish writing lyrics. I think it affected our moods throughout the day." Barker felt that anger and aggression – oftentimes due to his divorce from his first wife, Melissa Kennedy – sank into his recorded parts. In addition, some of the lyrics were inspired by the band simply socializing together: "We would just hang out for hours talking. It was really cool," said DeLonge.

== Songs ==
"Stockholm Syndrome"
"Stockholm Syndrome" was inspired by World War II. During production, the band used a vintage microphone and played the recordings into a shower to achieve unique reverb.

"I'm Lost Without You"
"I'm Lost Without You" mixes an industrial loop with piano, and contains an extended outro featuring two dueling drum tracks.

The record opens with "Feeling This", which features flanged drums and an unconventional "syncopated Latin-flavored backbeat and a harmony-rich chorus" following a series of "half-barked" vocals. It was the first song written for the album and illustrates a scenario of lust, ambivalence, and regret, with the protagonist of the song reflecting over his romance's dimming flame in the chorus: "Fate fell short this time / Your smile fades in the summer." Hoppus and DeLonge wrote the song in two different rooms and upon meeting to discuss the song, the two realized they had both written about sex—the passionate, lustful side (reflected in the verses) and the romantic side (the choruses). "Obvious" opens with a brooding, discordant guitar riff, and explores the Wall of Sound technique. "I Miss You" is an all-acoustic affair, featuring a melancholy piano, cello, upright acoustic bass, and a "brushstroked hip-hop groove." The song features references to Tim Burton's 1993 animated film The Nightmare Before Christmas with "We can live like Jack and Sally" and "We'll have Halloween on Christmas". In interviews and the liner notes for Blink-182, Barker reveals that the line was directed towards his then-girlfriend, Shanna Moakler.

"Violence" equates broken hearts with global warfare. It explores a jazzy spoken-word style and was envisioned as an account of a fictional femme fatale being lusted after by strangers at a late-night bar. "Stockholm Syndrome", named for the psychological condition, focuses thematically on paranoia: "[It's about] being afraid of the outside world [and] convinced that people can hear your thoughts," Hoppus said. It contains an interlude preceding it, in which actress Joanne Whalley reads letters Hoppus's grandfather wrote to his grandmother during World War II. DeLonge called the valentines "real sincere, genuine [correspondence] from the worst war in history." "Down" continues the theme of longing; DeLonge developed the song imagining a couple in a car, overcome by desire during a cascading rainfall. The original version of "Down" ran over six minutes long, and contained a drum and bass breakdown from Barker. "The Fallen Interlude", which functions as a near-instrumental outro to "Down", finds Barker showcasing different percussive techniques over a funk-tinged jazz sound. "Go" is an urgent, broken family diegesis from Hoppus filtered through vivid snapshots of his childhood: “Locked outside the door back in '83 / I heard the angry voice of the man inside / And saw the look of fear in my mother's eyes.” Hoppus confirmed the song was about domestic violence in the album's booklet, but stopped short of much else in an interview: "It's not specifically about my mother... I feel weird talking about it."

"Asthenia" is named after the breakdown of life in space, and centers on a lonely, stranded astronaut viewing Earth from a capsule, indifferent about returning. DeLonge said the song was "about the loss of hope"; it was spawned by his personal torment regarding the future, and how war and famine might affect the world. The intro uses real NASA transmissions from the Apollo 9 space flight. "Always" is a love letter to new wave music, with an uptempo backbeat, dry production and dreamy keyboard riffs. The band often called the track the "'80s song" while making it. "Easy Target" and "All of This" stem from a story from producer Jerry Finn. While in middle school, Finn had a crush with a female classmate, Holly, who invited him over to her house. When he rode there on his bicycle, she and a friend drenched him with a hose, and he rode home humiliated. "All of This" is a "gothic-tinged pop song that uses strings and guitar effects" along with guest vocals from Robert Smith of the Cure to create a moody atmosphere. Hoppus described "Here's Your Letter" as about "people's inability to communicate with one another and how words and explanations only confuse the issues." "I'm Lost Without You" mixes an industrial loop with piano. The latter track took many months to create, and took "over 50" different tracks, including two drum sets combined during the last minute of the song. Barker described the idea for the percussion combination as "something we always wanted to do, but never got around to" and believed the song sounded like Pink Floyd or Failure.

"Not Now", a B-side recorded during the sessions, is occasionally appended to the album. It features a church organ in its verses and guitar riffs reminiscent of the Descendents. Its subject matter continues the theme of complicated miscommunication and fading love.

== Packaging and title ==
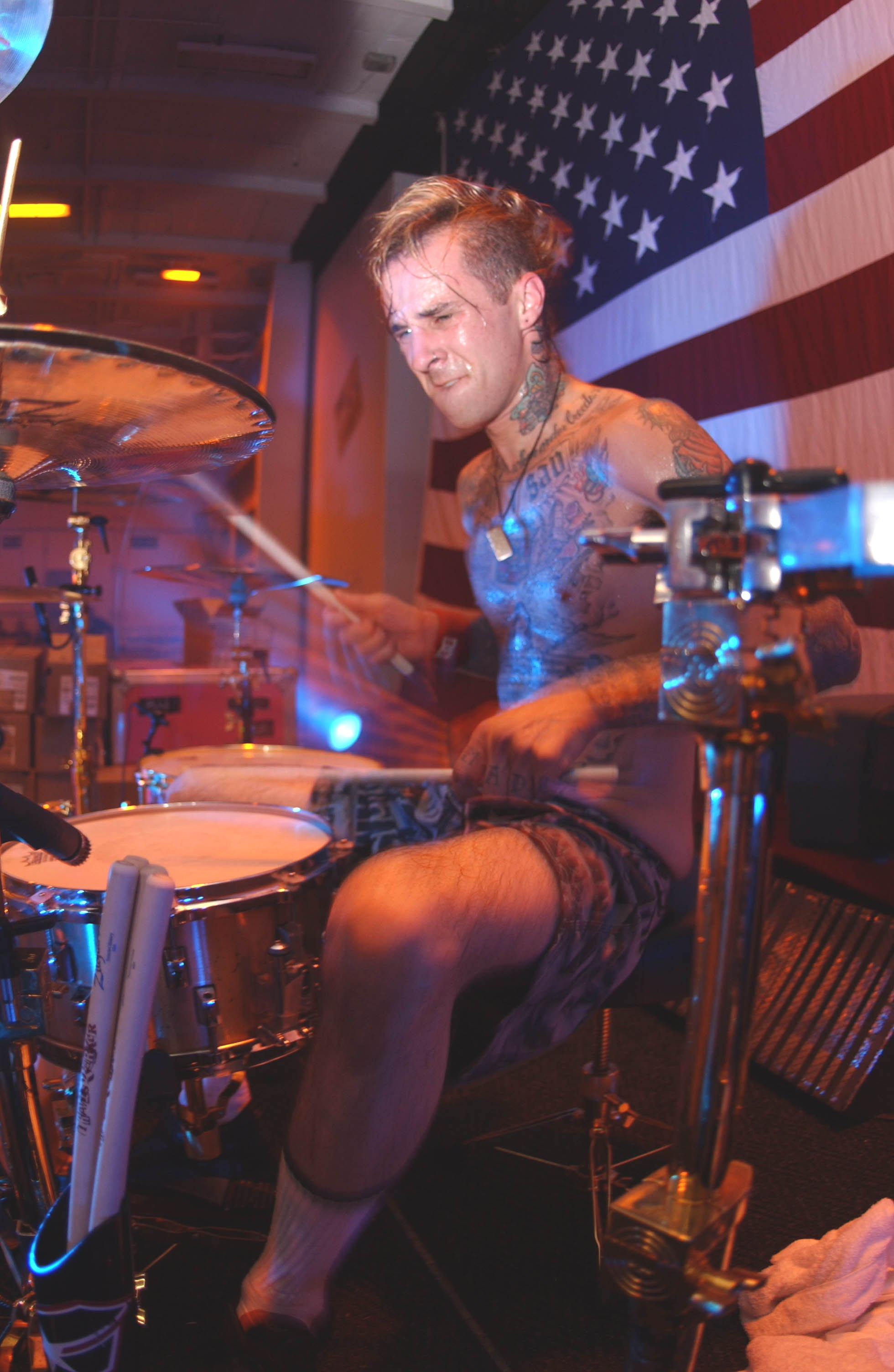
Album artwork was led by drummer Travis Barker, who was inspired by English act The Jam and pop art.

Due to some contradicting sources, the title of the album (or lack thereof) is debated. Travis Barker, in his memoir Can I Say, writes that "Some people think it's an untitled album, called Blink-182, but Mark [Hoppus] has always insisted it was actually untitled." A 2003 interview and article from MTV News discussing the naming of the pending album repeatedly refers to the release as the "untitled album," while a press release from that time period confirms the same. Despite this, several critics have used the terms "eponymous", "untitled", and "self-titled" in describing the album. In a 2009 MTV News article, James Montgomery refers to the album as self-titled, joking, "Or untitled … It's never really been clear." The title for the album was originally rumored to be Use Your Erection I & II, a parody of the Guns N' Roses albums Use Your Illusion I and II, but was revealed to be a joke Barker made to "get a rise out of people." DeLonge, in reference to previous joke album titles (such as Enema of the State), stated, "We didn't want to label it with a joke title that people might expect." As such, a Billboard article from the week of the album's release lists three rejected joke titles: Diarrhea de Janeiro, Vasectomy, Vasect-a-you and "Our Pet Sounds".

To support the new album, Blink-182 created an entirely new logo, a "smiley face" with Xs for each eye and five arrows on the left side of its face. According to Barker, the Blink-182 logo originated at his clothing line, Famous Stars and Straps. Barker wanted to brand an icon for the band: "It just had to be a cool kind of happy face but I wanted arrows. You know, like the Jam were my favorite band, they always had arrows in their logos and stuff. It was just kind of inspired by pop-art." Reference points included the Black Flag bars or the Descendents' drawing of singer Milo Aukerman. Hoppus seconded this sentiment: "He spearheaded all the artwork for the record. There were smiley-face stickers and posters all over Los Angeles, and that was his idea." Barker invited his tattoo artist, Mister Cartoon, to create artwork for the record, and his friend Estevan Oriol to handle photography. "His style, incorporated into Blink's, didn't make us too gangster: it just gave us a bit of an edge. It was cool to feel like Blink had a dangerous side", Barker later remembered.

The album's booklet is ornate, and each song includes small notes detailing the lyrical inspiration for each song, what it means to each band member, and the recording techniques used. musicOMH described the album booklet as "...meticulously put together and resembling a Warholian pastiche." The band originally wanted each CD booklet to be made from canvas material. Geffen gave the band a choice between the custom artwork or keeping the sale price down to US$12, and the band chose the latter, as they felt it was more important that young listeners obtain the record for less money. Mark Hoppus stated that the album was so "personal to all three of us that we really wanted to be involved in every aspect of it." The enhanced CD contains small, home-made videos for several songs, as well as the official music video for "Feeling This".

== Promotion and singles ==
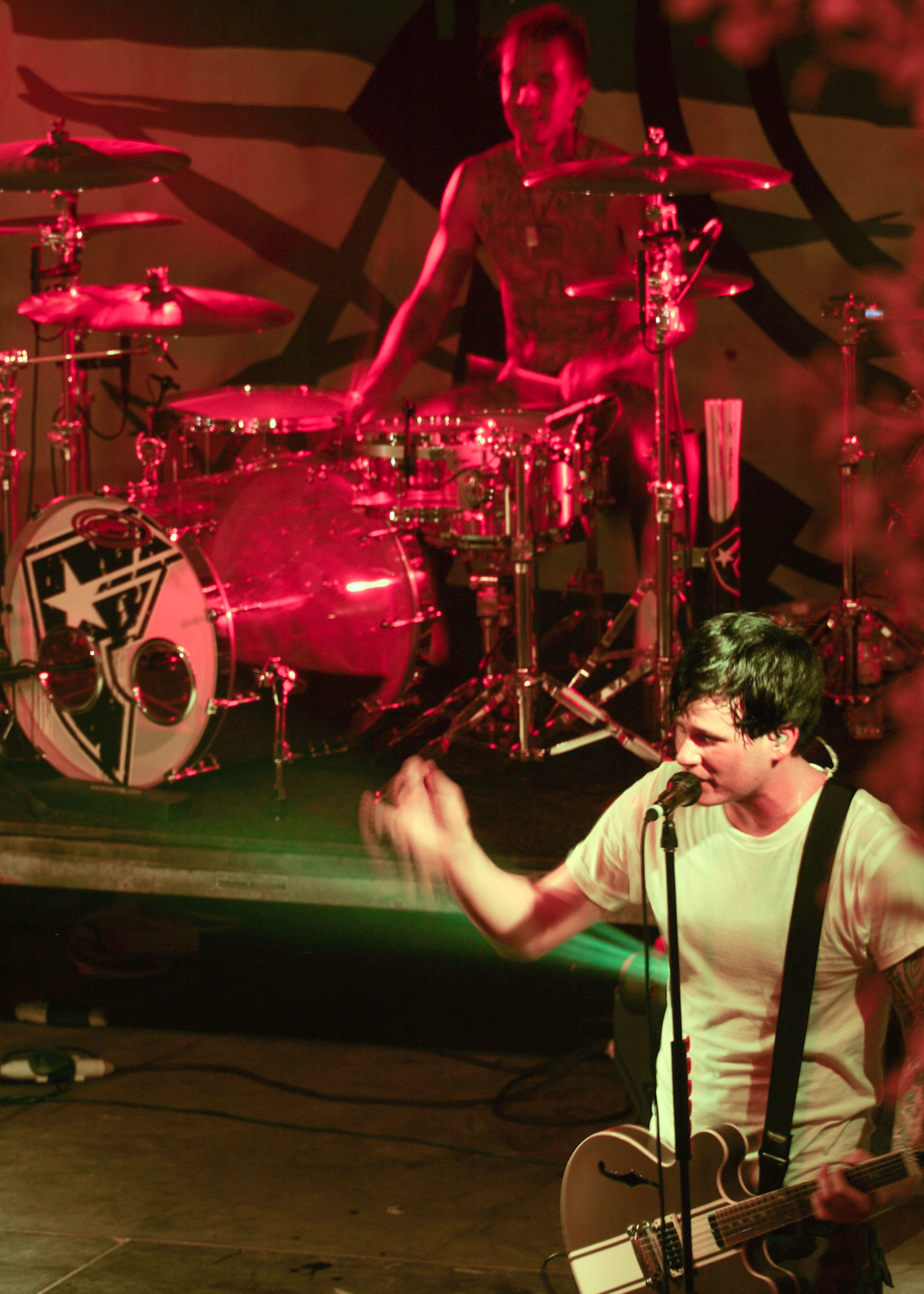
The band live in Bahrain; they performed several songs from the album for the first time publicly in the Middle East

The band launched the promotional cycle for the album with a performance on MTV's Total Request Live, where they performed on the roof top of the network's Times Square headquarters. Other marketing for the record included a "golden ticket" contest – the prize being a private Blink-182 show for the winner. MTV's website streamed the full album a week before its release, beginning on November 10. As promotion for the album and single release[s], the band performed "Feeling This" on Jimmy Kimmel Live! a week after the release of the album on November 26, 2003, and "Down" on Late Show with David Letterman on May 27, 2004. Performances of "I Miss You" and "The Rock Show" on The WB's Pepsi Smash concert series from June 10, 2004, were released on the Australian Tour edition of the album, as well as the "Always" single.

The band picked "Feeling This" as the first single because it was representative of the transition the band had undergone since Take Off Your Pants and Jacket. A slightly different version of the song had been released previously as part of the soundtrack for the video game Madden NFL 2004 under the erroneous title "Action". Barker explained in an interview that "'Action' just sounded kind of dorky to us. Like we would always call it 'Feeling This' and then someone at our label, I think, like wrote it as 'Action' one time and sent out singles to people. And it was always supposed to be 'Feeling This'." The video for "Feeling This" was recorded shortly before the release of the album in October 2003. The track peaked high at number 2 on the Billboard Modern Rock Tracks chart, hovering at that position for three weeks. "I Miss You" was commissioned as the record's second single in December 2003 when the band recorded a music video for it. "I Miss You" became arguably the most successful single from the album, becoming Blink-182's second number one hit on the Billboard Modern Rock Tracks chart during the week of April 3, 2004, until dethroned by Hoobastank's "The Reason" two weeks later.

Despite briefly considering "Easy Target" to be released as the album's third single, "Down" was released instead. The video for "Down", which features real-life ex-gang members, made its television premiere in June 2004. The single was a mixed success, peaking at number 10 on the Billboard Modern Rock Tracks chart during the week of July 31, 2004, but quickly falling off afterward. "Always" was announced as the fourth and final single from Blink-182 in August 2004. "It's gonna change people's lives and might actually change the world forever", DeLonge jokingly predicted. After deciding on the video concept, the clip was recorded and released in November 2004 and continued success all the way into January 2005. A fifth single from the album ("All of This") was discussed; however, plans were dropped following the band's declaration of an 'indefinite hiatus' in February 2005. In response to the idea of "All of This" becoming a possible single, DeLonge joked "We would love it because it's a bad-ass song, and The Cure's Robert Smith sings on it, and that makes us cooler than everybody else."

== Critical reception ==
Professional ratings
Aggregate scores
Source	Rating
Metacritic	71/100
Review scores
Source	Rating
AllMusic	4/5 stars
Alternative Press	4.5/5 stars
Blender	4/5 stars
E!	B+
Entertainment Weekly	A−
The Independent	4/5 stars
Rolling Stone	4/5 stars
Spin	A−
USA Today	3.5/4 stars
Sputnikmusic	5.0/5

The album received generally favorable reviews by music critics. At Metacritic, which assigns a normalized rating out of 100 to reviews from mainstream critics, the album received an average score of 71, based on 12 reviews. Jenny Eliscu of Rolling Stone, while giving the album four stars, wrote that "...their lyrics are still unsophisticated and lovelorn, but even the poppiest tunes prove artful". Her review regards Blink-182 as "more experimental and harder-hitting than anything else [the band] has done". It was subsequently included in the Top 50 Best of 2003 end of the year list by Rolling Stone. The album was given four stars by AllMusic's Stephen Thomas Erlewine, who called Blink-182 "an unexpected and welcome maturation from a band that just an album ago seemed permanently stuck in juvenilia." Blender's Jonah Weiner praised DeLonge's vocals, describing them as a "lean, thrilling ride through adolescent hopelessness." Many critics expressed surprise at the newfound maturity of the band, and lauded the surprise appearance of The Cure vocalist Robert Smith on the track "All of This".

The band's decision in favor of more mature material was received positively by many critics; Tim Newbound of Soul Shine Magazine wrote that "Blink show that they can retain their infectious and endearing qualities while recording music of a more thoughtful calibre." Spin described the record as emotionally intense and best experienced through headphones. USA Today's Edna Gundersen felt that "Blink-182 bravely adheres to a single sober theme — a disintegrating romance — through 14 songs that adhere to its pop punk principles without recycling cartoonish accessories. Blink-182 is growing up, not growing stale." Nick Catucci of The Village Voice called the album "brilliant" and compared Blink-182 to fellow pop punk band Green Day's 2000 effort, Warning, writing, "Let it be noted, however, that Warning searches for subject matter where Blink-182 searches for meaning." Greg Kot of Entertainment Weekly wrote that "Despite their newfound earnestness, [the band] seem incapable of pretension. And in a career littered with songs about awkward moments, their latest is a dork classic." Scott Shelter of Slant gave the album four stars, stating "Giving up the fart jokes is risky business for Blink—but Blink-182 might just be the band's best album to date." Among the more negative reviews, Jason Arnopp of Q felt the majority of material forgettable but commended it as "some of their most imaginatively constructed work." The A.V. Club's Stephen Thompson believed "The disc [does] meander in spots, and its most achingly sincere love songs become cloying."

== Commercial performance ==
The album debuted at number three on the US Billboard 200 chart, with first-week sales of 313,000 copies. In comparison, Take Off Your Pants and Jacket debuted at number one and sold more than 350,000 copies in its first week. The album charted at number three, below fellow new album In the Zone by Britney Spears (number one) and above remix album Let It Be... Naked by the Beatles (number five). The untitled album charted highest in Canada, where it debuted at number one. The album was also successful in other countries, debuting in the top ten in Australia and New Zealand. According to the IFPI, Blink-182 was the forty-ninth highest-selling album worldwide in 2003.

The album was certified by the RIAA as platinum for shipments of over one million copies in 2004, although it has since sold over 2.2 million copies in the US and 7 million copies worldwide. It was certified by both the Music Canada and the Australian Recording Industry Association (ARIA) as double platinum. The album has also reached platinum certifications in the United Kingdom.

== Touring ==
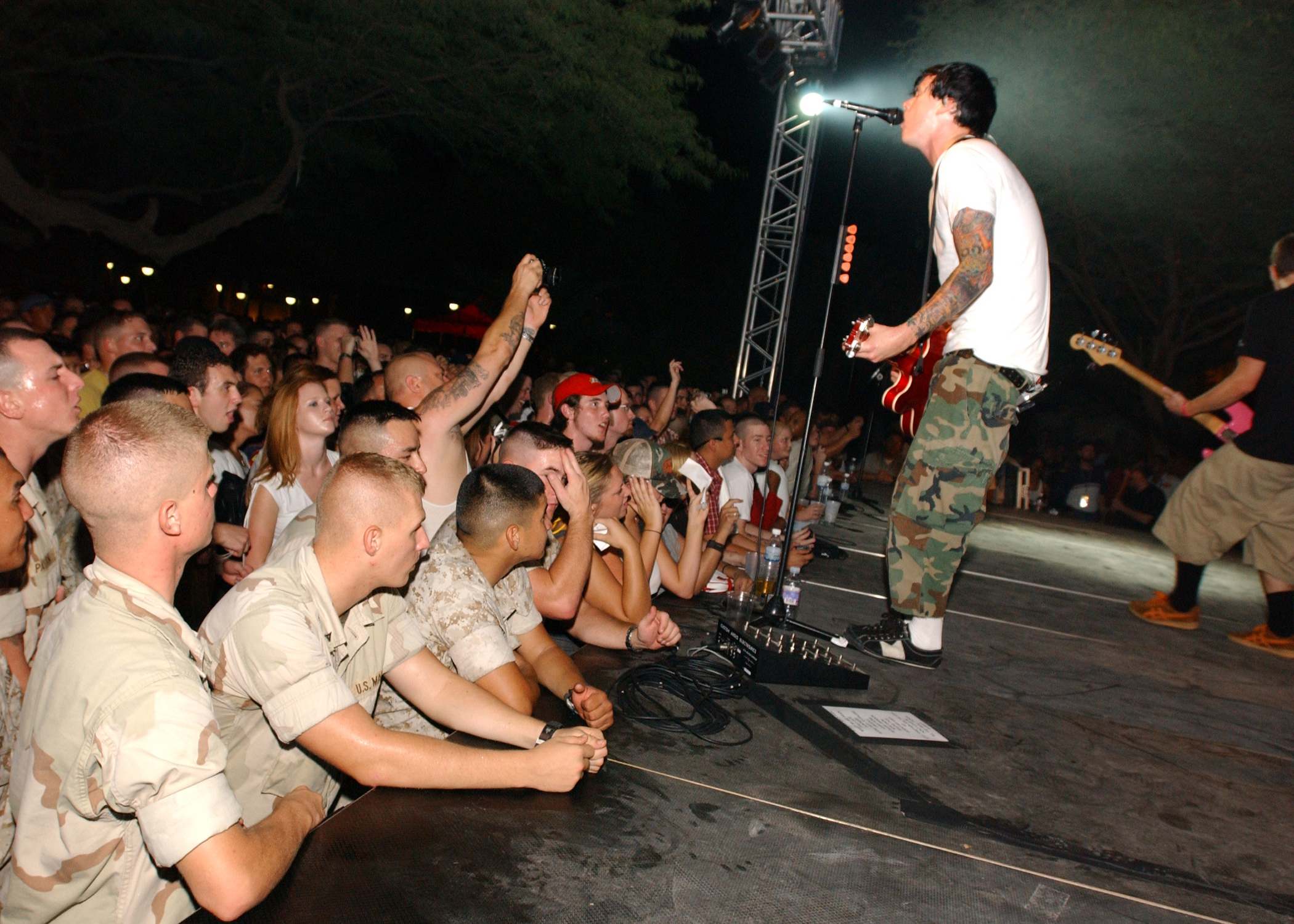
The band performing in Bahrain for sailors and marines in August 2003.

Blink-182 announced their first tour in support of Untitled on October 17, 2003, named the DollaBill Tour. The all-ages club tour featured support acts Bubba Sparxxx and The Kinison, and, as the name suggests, tickets were sold for $1. DeLonge explained the first return to small venues in several years in the initial press release for the tour: "For years we played in small clubs and that's where you can really connect with your fans." The tour ended shortly after the release of Untitled on November 21, 2003, at local San Diego venue SOMA. An additional concert at the Phoenix Concert Theatre on December 2, 2003, was held in Toronto, Ontario, Canada with My Chemical Romance as the opener.

A performance at KWOD's Twisted X-Mas show shortly before Christmas 2003 became the final show of the year, and a European tour followed in mid-February 2004. During an Australian tour in March 2004, Barker injured his foot and the band was forced to cancel tour dates in Japan for the rest of the month. A U.S. tour took place from late April to May 2004, and a highly publicized tour featuring Blink-182 and No Doubt was performed during June 2004 in support of Untitled and No Doubt's The Singles 1992–2003. The cancelled Australian tour dates were rescheduled and performed in August and September 2004. The band appeared on September 17, 2004, at the MTV Icon tribute to The Cure, performing a cover of "A Letter to Elise" and "All of This", which was recorded and later broadcast on October 31, 2004. The band headed to Europe for a two-week tour near the end of the year, which culminated at their final show on December 16, 2004, at the Point Theatre in Dublin, Ireland.

Although the band had planned for a U.S. tour in support of "Always", tensions within the band had risen on the final European tour and the band announced an 'indefinite hiatus' on February 22, 2005, as breakup rumors swirled. After touring through 2004, the three essentially stopped communicating with one another. Hoppus initially had difficulty accepting the group's new direction. After some tragic events involving the band and its entourage, Blink-182 reunited in February 2009.

== Legacy ==
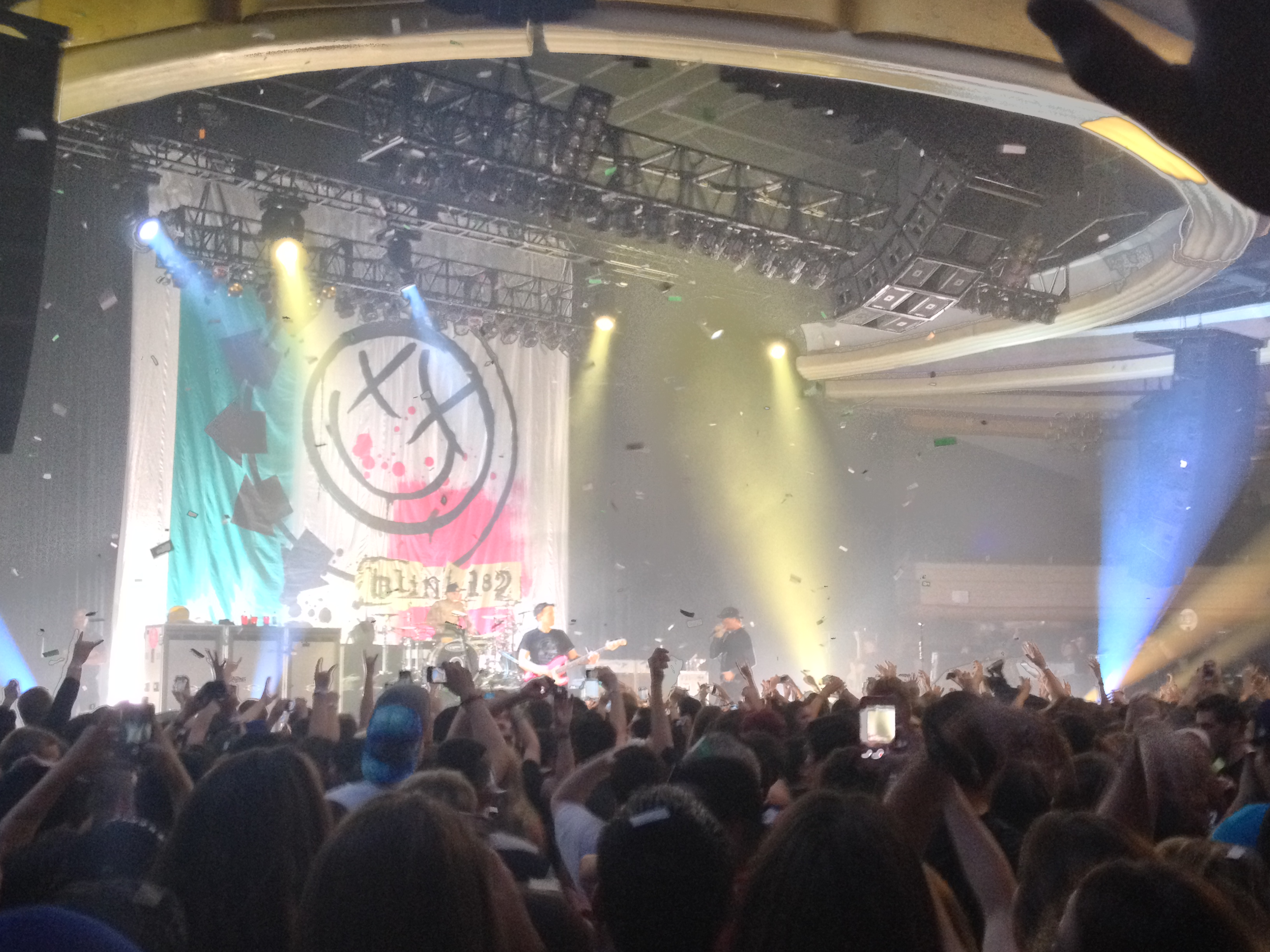
Blink-182 celebrating the album's tenth anniversary at the Hollywood Palladium in November 2013.

Blink-182 was released at a cultural moment when the pop-punk and emo scenes were coalescing to a mainstream peak, and as a new wave of artists indebted to the band, like Fall Out Boy, Paramore, or Panic! at the Disco, came to fill their place. It also fell at the tail-end of an "imperial phase" for the band: fifteen months after its release, the band had broken up, ending what many fans regard as their classic period. In the ensuing years, Blink-182 developed a legacy due to the relative silence that followed it. "I Miss You" became a cross-generational 2000s classic, due in part to DeLonge's endlessly meme-able singing style. Shirts emblazoned with the album's "smiley" artwork became common fixtures in Hot Topic over the decades. And while the band would reconcile and continue to tour and make albums, Blink-182 remains a singular touchstone in its catalog—to both fans and the band themselves.

All three members of the band viewed it as a "huge turning point" in their career, marking a change in the way they write and record music, as well as view themselves. In his memoir Can I Say, Barker writes: "It had a little bit of everything: we ventured far enough outside our genre to make ourselves happy, but not so far that we offended our fan base. It was a perfect happy medium, and it's the Blink album that Mark, Tom, and I are most proud of." Critics agreed: Chris Lee at the Los Angeles Times referred to Untitled as the band's "underrated masterwork," writing that the record is generally considered by "fans, critics and band members alike as its best work, Blink's answer to Pet Sounds or Sgt. Pepper's Lonely Hearts Club Band." Jon Blistein of Radio.com called the album "an unquestionable masterpiece" in the site's "Not Fade Away" series, which examines "some of the greatest albums of the past few decades." The band celebrated the tenth anniversary of the album by performing it in full in November 2013. After a pair of Hollywood Palladium shows sold out in a record 32 seconds, the band added three additional dates at The Wiltern in Los Angeles, which also sold out.

Two decades after its heyday, it continues to influence younger generations of bands. Hardcore group One Step Closer have professed a love for the album, and Eric Hamm from Citizen called himself a "big fan" of the album. Parker Cannon of the Story So Far described the album as a blueprint to remaining authentic in his career: "[Blink] were just like, 'Yeah, it is a crazy time, and we're going to write the most progressive body of work that we've ever done, and we don't necessarily care if you like it or not. This is who we are.' So seeing them doing that—and seeing other peers I've had in music not do that—has showed me how to stay the course and how to stay true."

== Track listing ==
All tracks are written by Mark Hoppus, Tom DeLonge, and Travis Barker, except where noted.

No.	Title	Writer(s)	Lead vocals	Length
1.	"Feeling This"		DeLonge/Hoppus	2:53
2.	"Obvious"		DeLonge	2:43
3.	"I Miss You"		Hoppus/DeLonge	3:47
4.	"Violence": "Violence"; "Stockholm Syndrome Interlude"		DeLonge; Joanne Whalley	5:20 (3:40) (1:40)
5.	"Stockholm Syndrome"		Hoppus/DeLonge	2:41
6.	"Down"		DeLonge/Hoppus	3:04
7.	"The Fallen Interlude"	Hoppus, DeLonge, Barker, Sick Jacken	Ron "Menno" Froese	2:12
8.	"Go"		Hoppus/DeLonge	1:53
9.	"Asthenia"		DeLonge	4:20
10.	"Always"		DeLonge	4:12
11.	"Easy Target"		DeLonge/Hoppus	2:20
12.	"All of This"	Hoppus, DeLonge, Barker, Robert Smith	Smith/DeLonge	4:40
13.	"Here's Your Letter"		Hoppus	2:55
14.	"I'm Lost Without You"		DeLonge	6:20
Total length:				49:21

Enhanced material
No.	Title	Lead vocals	Length
1.	"Feeling This" (homemade video)	DeLonge/Hoppus	2:52
2.	"Obvious" (homemade video)	DeLonge	2:44
3.	"Down" / "The Fallen Interlude" (homemade video)	DeLonge/Hoppus/Froese	5:15
4.	"Violence" (homemade video)	DeLonge	3:42

International bonus track
No.	Title	Lead vocals	Length
15.	"Anthem Part Two" (live in Chicago)	DeLonge	3:45

UK bonus tracks
No.	Title	Lead vocals	Length
15.	"Not Now"	DeLonge	4:09
16.	"Anthem Part Two" (live in Chicago)	DeLonge	3:45

UK tour edition and SRC Vinyl bonus track
No.	Title	Lead vocals	Length
15.	"Not Now"	DeLonge	4:09

Japanese bonus track
No.	Title	Lead vocals	Length
15.	"The Rock Show" (live in Chicago)	Hoppus	3:37

Australian tour edition bonus tracks
No.	Title	Lead vocals	Length
15.	"I Miss You" (live in Minneapolis)	Hoppus/DeLonge	3:58
16.	"The Rock Show" (live in Minneapolis)	Hoppus	3:03

Japanese tour edition bonus disc
No.	Title	Writer(s)	Lead vocals	Length
1.	"Not Now"		DeLonge	4:09
2.	"Carousel" (live in Chicago)	Hoppus, DeLonge	DeLonge	2:55

UK tour edition bonus DVD
No.	Title	Length
1.	"Down" (homemade video)	3:46
2.	"Feeling This" (homemade video)	2:52
3.	"Obvious" (homemade video)	2:44
4.	"Stockholm Syndrome" (homemade video)	4:15
5.	"The Fallen Interlude" (homemade video)	2:12
6.	"Violence" (homemade video)	3:42
7.	"Feeling This" (music video)	3:09
8.	"I Miss You" (music video)	3:50
9.	"Down" (music video)	3:17
10.	"Always" (music video)	4:12
11.	"Stay Together for the Kids" (original music video)	3:58
12.	"Stay Together for the Kids" (alternate music video)	4:00
13.	"What's My Age Again?" (music video)	2:27
14.	"Feeling This" (making of the video)	2:01
15.	"I Miss You" (making of the video)	2:01
16.	"Down" (making of the video)	5:06
17.	"Photo gallery" (slideshow)	– –

Notes

- "Feeling This" contains a sample from Captain America (1990).
- Digital releases set the spoken-word section of track 4 "Violence", performed by Joanne Whalley, as a separate track titled "Stockholm Syndrome Interlude", incrementing all subsequent tracks by 1.
- "Asthenia" begins with the sound of NASA transmissions from the Apollo 9 space flight.

== Personnel ==
Per the Blink-182 liner notes.

Blink-182

- Mark Hoppus – vocals, bass guitar (1, 2, 4–6, 8–11, 13, 14), Fender Bass VI (10, 12), acoustic bass guitar (3), Roland bass synthesizer (10), sampling (1)
- Tom DeLonge – vocals, electric guitar (1, 2, 4–6, 8–14), acoustic guitar (3, 12)
- Travis Barker – drums, percussion, looping (3), backing vocals (2), whispers (6)

Additional personnel

- Roger Joseph Manning, Jr. – keyboards
- Robert Smith – vocals on "All of This"
- Ron "Menno" Froese – guitar and vocals on "The Fallen Interlude"
- John Morrical – additional keyboards on "All of This"
- Ken Andrews – additional guitars and keyboards on "Violence" and "Obvious"
- Joanne Whalley – spoken word on "Stockholm Syndrome Interlude"

Artwork

- Max Gramajo – cover illustration
- Blink-182 – cover illustration, liner notes
- Estevan Oriol – photography
- Sonny Flats – design, layout
- Scandalous – design, layout
- Mr. Cartoon – design, layout

Production

- Jerry Finn – producer (all except 7), mixing engineer (1, 7, 9, and 13)
- Sick Jacken – producer and engineer (7)
- Tom Lord-Alge – mixing engineer (2, 3, 6, and 12)
- Andy Wallace – mix engineer (4, 5, 8, and 11)
- Ryan Hewitt – mix engineer (10 and 14), recording (all except 7)
- Bunny Lake – vocal engineer (12)
- Sam Boukas – assistant engineer
- John Morrical – assistant engineer
- James McCrone – assistant engineer
- Alan Mason – assistant engineer
- Seth Waldman – assistant engineer
- Steve Sisco – assistant engineer
- Femio Hernandez – assistant engineer
- Brian Gardner – mastering engineer

== Chart positions ==
=== Weekly charts ===
Chart (2003–04)	Peak position
Australian Albums (ARIA)	7
Austrian Albums (Ö3 Austria)	16
Belgian Albums (Ultratop Flanders)	27
Canadian Albums (Billboard)	1
Dutch Albums (Album Top 100)	71
French Albums (SNEP)	26
German Albums (Offizielle Top 100)	14
Irish Albums (IRMA)	18
Italian Albums (FIMI)	26
Japanese Albums (Oricon)	16
New Zealand Albums (RMNZ)	10
Norwegian Albums (VG-lista)	22
Scottish Albums (Official Charts)	16
Singaporean Albums (RIAS)	6
Swedish Albums (Sverigetopplistan)	22
Swiss Albums (Schweizer Hitparade)	17
UK Albums (Official Charts)	22
UK Rock & Metal Albums (Official Charts)	1
US Billboard 200	3

=== Year-end charts ===
Chart (2003)	Position
Australian Albums (ARIA)	92
UK Albums (OCC)	188
Worldwide Albums (IFPI)	49

Chart (2004)	Position
Australian Albums (ARIA)	32
UK Albums (OCC)	84
US Billboard 200	23

== Certifications ==
Region	Certification	Certified units/sales
Argentina (CAPIF)	Gold	20,000^{^}
Australia (ARIA)	2× Platinum	140,000^{^}
Brazil (Pro-Música Brasil)	Gold	50,000^{*}
Canada (Music Canada)	2× Platinum	200,000^{^}
Germany (BVMI)	Gold	100,000^{‡}
Mexico (AMPROFON)	Gold	50,000^{^}
New Zealand (RMNZ)	Gold	7,500^{^}
United Kingdom (BPI)	Platinum	300,000^{^}
United States (RIAA)	2× Platinum	2,200,000
^{*} Sales figures based on certification alone.^{^} Shipments figures based on certification alone.^{‡} Sales+streaming figures based on certification alone.
