= Asthenia (song) =

2003 song by Blink-182

Song by Blink-182

from the album Blink-182
- Recorded: January–October 2003; The Rubin's House, Signature Sound, Rolling Thunder (San Diego, California); Conway Recording Studios (Hollywood, California)
- Genre: Emo; pop-punk
- Length: 4:19
- Label: Geffen
- Songwriters: Tom DeLonge; Mark Hoppus; Travis Barker
- Producer: Jerry Finn

"Asthenia" is a song by American punk rock band Blink-182. It is the ninth track on the band's 2003 self-titled fifth studio album. Though credited to all three members, the song was written by guitarist and vocalist Tom DeLonge. Centered on an imagined astronaut isolated in space, the track uses its setting to convey a distinctly hopeless and introspective tone, exploring themes of loneliness and emotional distance. Inspired in part by Edgar Mitchell, the sixth person to walk on the Moon, the song reflects DeLonge's fascination with space and cosmic imagery.

The song contains atmospheric production, opening with an extended ambient intro incorporating transmissions from Apollo 9. Its sound design features unconventional recording techniques, including heavily processed, flanger-tinged guitar tones. Upon release, "Asthenia" was praised for its lyrical depth and has since been regarded as a precursor to DeLonge's later work with Angels & Airwaves, particularly in its space-oriented themes and expansive sonic approach.

== Background ==
Guitarist Tom DeLonge grew up captivated with the cosmos and the unknowns of outer space. On Enema of the State, the band's 1999 breakthrough album, he wrote "Aliens Exist", an ode to his belief in extraterrestrial life. Later in his career, DeLonge became a notable ufologist, founding the To the Stars, which was instrumental in bringing to light classified Pentagon reporting on unidentified aerial phenomena.

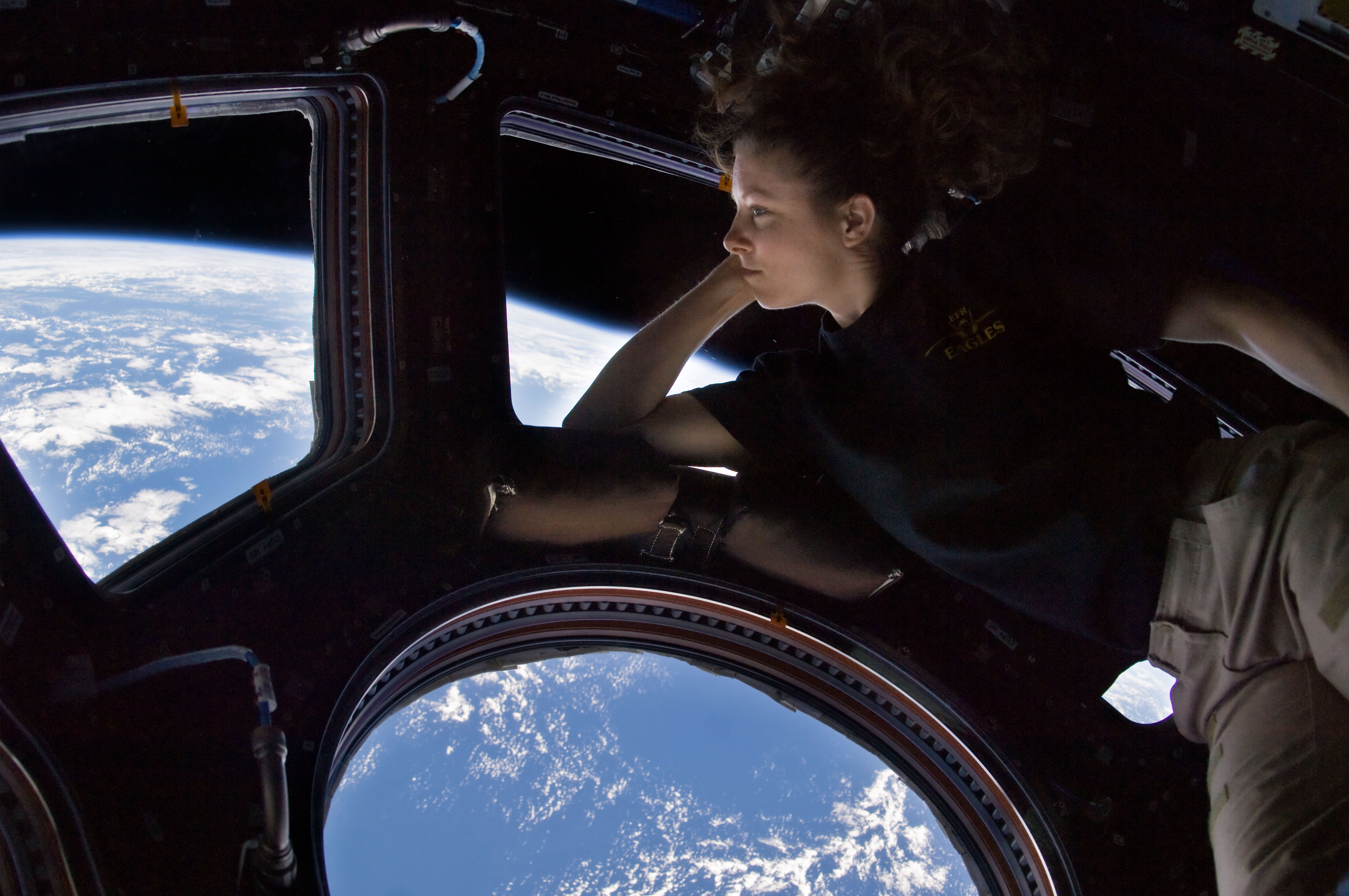
Tracy Caldwell Dyson in the International Space Station's Cupola

"Asthenia" explores an imagined scenario set in space. During the writing process, DeLonge envisioned a scenario with a astronaut gazing out of the window of a space capsule. The astronaut contextualizes the negative aspects of his home planet—conflict, chaos, and global unrest—and questions if it is worth returning. Overall, the heartsick song explores themes of loss, loneliness, and longing. DeLonge said the song was "about the loss of hope"; it was spawned by his personal torment regarding the future, and how war and famine might affect the world. "Earth seems like a pretty scary place for being so tiny and almost nothing in the universe," he observed. The song's title stems from the medical term for weakness; in the context of spaceflight, it refers to a syndrome of mental and physical fatigue.

"Asthenia" begins with an extended, ambient intro that utilizes NASA transmissions from the Apollo 9 space flight. The song employs unusual mic techniques; the intro was achieved by recording the guitar through a failing Leslie speaker with a blown-out tube for excessive noise and scratchiness. In the verses, which are accented with handclaps, DeLonge pleads for connection from the astronaut's perspective, describing the spacecraft cabin as "void of all passion" and asking the mission control center: "Where are you, Houston? Is somebody out there? Will somebody listen?" The working title for the song was "I Should Have Got Caught".

In an interview, DeLonge expounded on his influences for the song:

I was always fascinated by the astronauts who went to the moon and came back and they always said that when you see the Earth floating in the blackness, you realize how insignificant we are, and it really affected them. "Asthenia" was influenced by Edgar Mitchell who was the sixth person to walk on the moon.

== Reception ==
"Asthenia" received positive marks from contemporary music critics. Dave Simpson of The Guardian praised its lyrical depth, noting that its mature tone "suggest[s] a songwriter yearning to create something of more substance." Jenny Eliscu in Rolling Stone commended its "catchy hook", while Chelsey Norris of the Dallas Observer called it a "chilling, otherworldly track." Sarah Bellamy of Music Feeds interpreted the lyric "this room is bored of rehearsal / and sick of the boundaries" as reflecting DeLonge's possible feelings of creative stagnation and frustration within Blink-182 at the time. "Asthenia" has been viewed in retrospect as a precursor to DeLonge's work with his second band, Angels & Airwaves, which he started in 2005, particularly with its extended intro and space theming.

The song was performed live during the album's supporting tour in 2004, and was revived for an anniversary tour a decade later. The band performed the song at Reading Festival 2014, one of their largest gigs.

== Personnel ==
Personnel adapted from Blink-182 CD liner notes

Blink-182

- Mark Hoppus – vocals, bass guitar
- Tom DeLonge – vocals, guitar
- Travis Barker – drums

Additional Personnel

- Roger Joseph Manning Jr. – piano

Production

- Jerry Finn – producer, mix engineer
- Ryan Hewitt – recording
- Brian Gardner – mastering engineer
