= Lost Without You =

Lost Without You may refer to:

== Music ==
=== Albums ===
- Lost Without You: Motown Lost & Found, by The Four Tops

=== Songs ===
- "Lost Without You" (Delta Goodrem song), 2003
- "Lost Without You" (Freya Ridings song), 2017
- "Lost Without U", a song by Robin Thicke
- "Lost Without You", song by Johnny Carroll
- "Lost Without You", song by Clarence "Frogman" Henry
- "Lost Without You", song by Kylie Minogue from Golden
- "Lost Without You", song by Vanessa Williams from Next

== See also ==
- I'm Lost Without You (disambiguation)
