= I'm Lost Without You =

2003 song by Blink-182

Song by Blink-182

from the album Blink-182
- Recorded: January–October 2003; The Rubin's House, Signature Sound, Rolling Thunder (San Diego, California); Conway Recording Studios (Hollywood, California)
- Genre: Emo; post-punk
- Length: 6:22
- Label: Geffen
- Songwriters: Tom DeLonge; Mark Hoppus; Travis Barker
- Producer: Jerry Finn

"I'm Lost Without You" is a song by American rock band Blink-182 and is the final track of the band's 2003 self-titled fifth studio album. The song was written by guitarist Tom DeLonge, bassist Mark Hoppus and drummer Travis Barker. Its narrative centers on a plea for emotional connection and fear of isolation. The mid-tempo track features a melancholic progression, blending piano, industrial-style loops, and heavily processed guitars to create a spacious, immersive soundscape that builds toward an extended dual-drum outro by Travis Barker.

The expansive song was developed over more than six months as the band continually expanded its arrangement and experimented with increasingly dense production techniques. Built from over 50 recorded layers and incorporating unconventional studio methods, the song evolved into an atmospheric, slow-burning composition that emphasizes texture and mood over traditional structure. The song was noted by critics for its ambitious, atmospheric departure from their typical pop-punk style.

== Background ==
The song was worked on for over six months, with each incarnation becoming bigger in sound and stranger in tone. In the initial draft of the song, what became the chorus was instead the verse and the song lacked a true chorus. There were "over 50 or so" tracks incorporated into the recording, and the song employs a recording technique that dates back to the 1960s, in which DeLonge sang into a rotating speaker to produce an "underwater" effect. The feedback in the middle of the song was created by tweaking and turning the guitar around "like an acrobat on drugs."

== Music ==
"I'm Lost Without You"
"I’m Lost Without You" mixes an industrial loop with piano, and contains an extended outro featuring two dueling drum tracks.

The song is composed in the key of A major and is set in time signature of common time with a tempo of 92 beats per minute.

When sequenced as a part of the album, the song segues directly from the previous track, "Here's Your Letter", which relates to isolation, dislocation, loneliness and miscommunication. The song opens with the combination of an industrial loop with piano, which reminded Barker of the music of Pink Floyd or Failure. The narrative involves a lover pleading to his female companion to stay, and the song centrals around this refrain: "Are you afraid of being alone?/ 'Cause I am/ I'm lost without you." "Slow, deliberate, lumbering beats" mix with the guitars, which are tampered with a "space-age" feel. The song, which recalls the music of the 1980s, "undulates and builds round a mid-paced and somewhat wistful feel." Journalist Joe Shooman connects the song thematically to "I Miss You", in that both are downbeat in tone and relate to lost love. The piano returns for a "quiet middle-eight" before the narrative ends, and the song carries on with an extended drum solo that serves as the outro. The dueling drums—one mixed in the right channel and the other in the left—was something the band had always discussed, but had never implemented into a song. The first drum track was played to a click track, whereas the other one consisted of Barker "playing until I couldn't stop playing." The result is the longest song the band ever recorded, clocking in at 6:20.

According to DeLonge, "the only way that you can really appreciate [the song] is if you have headphones and you dim the lights in your house and really sat there and listened to it."

== Reception ==
Allmusic singled out "I'm Lost Without You" as one of the "weirder, atmospheric pieces" on Blink-182, one that successfully molds "adventurous" songwriting with musical experimentation. The A.V. Club, however, referred to it as a "syrupy minor-key ballad."

== Personnel ==
Personnel adapted from Blink-182 CD liner notes

Blink-182

- Mark Hoppus – vocals, bass guitar
- Tom DeLonge – vocals, guitar
- Travis Barker – drums

Additional Personnel

- Roger Joseph Manning Jr. – piano

Production

- Jerry Finn – producer
- Ryan Hewitt – mix engineer
- Brian Gardner – mastering engineer
