= Stockholm Syndrome (Blink-182 song) =

Song by Blink-182

from the album Blink-182
- Recorded: January–October 2003; The Rubin's House, Signature Sound, Rolling Thunder (San Diego, California); Conway Recording Studios (Hollywood, California)
- Genre: Art rock; post-hardcore; pop-punk
- Length: 2:41
- Label: Geffen
- Songwriters: Mark Hoppus; Tom DeLonge; Travis Barker
- Producer: Jerry Finn

"Stockholm Syndrome" is a song by American rock band Blink-182. It is the fifth track on the band's fifth studio album, Blink-182 (2003). The song, primarily written by bassist Mark Hoppus (although all three members are credited), revolves around paranoia and miscommunication, while referencing the psychological phenomenon involving hostages of the same name. Actress Joanne Whalley provides the spoken word interlude preceding the song, which consists of recited World War II-era love letters.

== Background ==
"Stockholm Syndrome" originated when the band was recording at a small house they rented in the San Diego luxury community of Rancho Santa Fe, between January and April 2003." Barker recorded the drum track for the song rather unusually, piece by piece: first, he recorded the verses in a small room of the home, using a microphone dating to the 1950s. The drum track for the chorus was laid down in the main tracking room, and following this, he recorded drum fills separately, using a sped-up and "super compressed" tape machine. When played back at normal speed, this produced an effect Hoppus described as "deep and gigantic." Likewise, his vocal track was played into a shower to produce unique reverb.

The term "stockholm syndrome" refers to a psychological phenomenon in which hostages express empathy and sympathy and have positive feelings toward their captors, sometimes to the point of defending them. These feelings are generally considered irrational in light of the danger or risk endured by the victims, who essentially mistake a lack of abuse from their captors for an act of kindness.

== Composition ==
"Stockholm Syndrome"
"Stockholm Syndrome" was inspired by World War II. During production, the band used a vintage microphone and played the recordings into a shower to achieve unique reverb.

The song is composed in the key of E minor and is set in time signature of common time with a "moderately slow" tempo of 87 beats per minute. DeLonge and Hoppus' vocal range spans from D_{4} to B_{5}.

"Stockholm Syndrome" has been described as "one of the most obvious examples of Blink-182's experimentation." The song begins with an interlude featuring actress Joanne Whalley reciting love letters that Hoppus' grandfather wrote to his wife while fighting in World War II. "Real sincere, genuine letters from the worst war in history," DeLonge explained. In sequence with the track listing, "Stockholm Syndrome" follows "Violence," but the small interlude is featured on CD editions at the end of the prior song, which then segues into the main track. DeLonge referred to the track as an "aggressive punk rock anthem".

The song's primary composer, Hoppus, penned his lyrics on paranoia: "Being afraid of the outside world, convinced that people can hear your thoughts." The lyrics have been interpreted to refer to isolation in a relationship, and being on two entirely different planes in regards to dreams, leading to disappointment and miscommunication. "Its poignancy is undeniable," wrote journalist Joe Shooman. "There was of course a very contemporary point being made here too as the post-9/11 world of paranoia and warmongering and utterly altered the atmosphere throughout the Western world." Hoppus' fascination with miscommunication—“People more or less just wait to talk. And even then, words get in the way and intent gets lost," he said—led to the fear and loathing present in "Stockholm Syndrome," with lyrics such as, "I wish I could explain myself but words escape me." Andrew Sacher of BrooklynVegan described "Stockholm Syndrome" as "art rock as seen through a combination of post-hardcore and pop punk", with DeLonge and Hoppus "singing over a burst of loud rock music". Sacher also described the ending with Hoppus' voice "covered in distortion as the band pummels away at a suspenseful post-hardcore buildup."

Hoppus referred to the song as his favorite from Blink-182.

== Personnel ==
Blink-182

- Mark Hoppus – vocals, bass guitar
- Tom DeLonge – vocals, guitar
- Travis Barker – drums

Additional musician

- Roger Joseph Manning, Jr. – keyboards

Production

- Jerry Finn – producer
- Andy Wallace– mix engineer
- Brian Gardner – mastering engineer
