= All of This =

2003 song by Blink-182 featuring Robert Smith

Song by Blink-182 featuring Robert Smith

from the album Blink-182
- Released: November 18, 2003
- Recorded: January–October 2003; The Rubin's House, Signature Sound, Rolling Thunder (San Diego, California); Conway Recording Studios (Hollywood, California)
- Genre: Gothic pop; new wave
- Length: 4:40
- Label: Geffen
- Songwriters: Mark Hoppus; Tom DeLonge; Travis Barker; Robert Smith
- Producer: Jerry Finn

"All of This" is a song by the American rock band Blink-182 from their fifth studio album, Blink-182 (2003). The song is a collaboration with musician Robert Smith, frontman of the English rock band the Cure. "All of This" is a gothic-tinged pop song inspired by the Cure, and incorporates atmospheric guitars, strings, and a subdued tempo to create a moody, introspective sound distinct from the band's usual pop-punk style. The song shares songwriting credits between Smith, guitarist Tom DeLonge, bassist Mark Hoppus, drummer Travis Barker.

The collaboration with Smith came after the band invited him to contribute, despite initial uncertainty about how his voice would fit their sound. Smith's presence helped shape the track's dark, slow-burning, new wave aesthetic. Its sparse instrumentation features a mid-tempo drum loop paired with string arrangements. The song's narrative was adapted from a story told to the band by producer Jerry Finn about a humiliating middle school encounter involving a crush. On the album, it segues from "Easy Target", which carries a similar thematic approach.

The song was frequently cited as a highlight on the album and received positive reviews, with particular praise for its moody orchestration. The band, who were devoted fans of the Cure, saw the collaboration as a creative milestone. They performed the song live with Smith at Wembley Arena in 2004. "All of This" was briefly considered for the album's fifth single, but the idea was shelved when the band broke up in 2005.

== Background ==
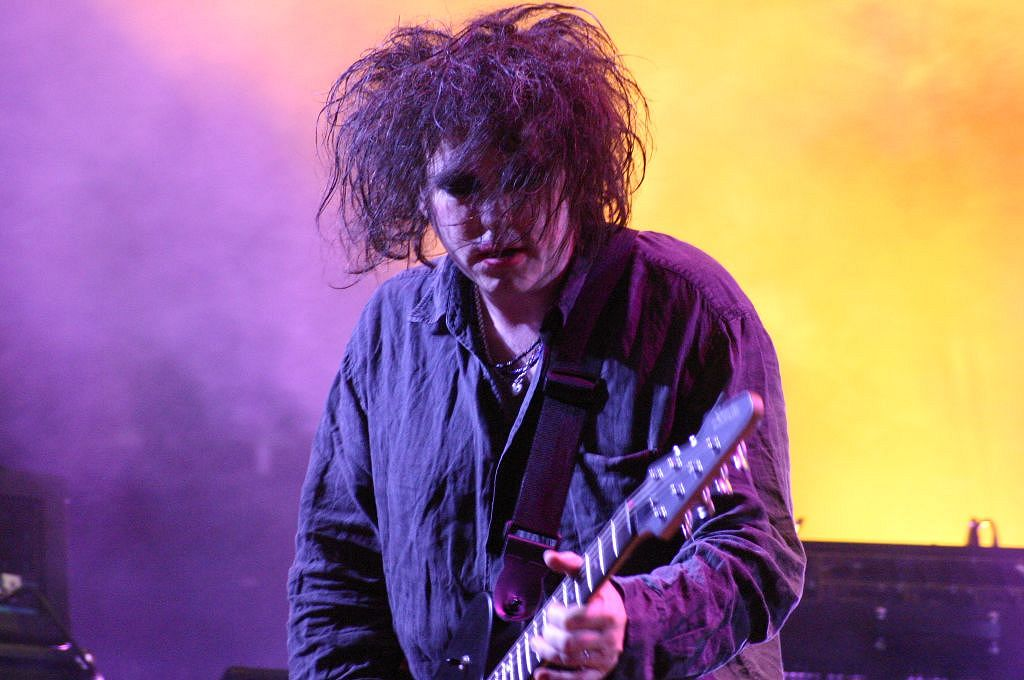
The song is a collaboration with the Cure frontman Robert Smith, pictured here in 2004.

"All of This", as well as the song it segues from, "Easy Target", were based on a story from producer Jerry Finn's middle school years. Finn was in love with a female classmate, Holly, who invited him over, only to have her and her friend drench him with a hose; humiliated, he rode home on his bicycle.

"All of This" is a collaboration with Robert Smith of the Cure. The Cure had long been an influence on Blink-182, particularly bassist Mark Hoppus, who had been a devoted fan since adolescence. After borrowing a cassette of the band's album Kiss Me, Kiss Me, Kiss Me in middle school, Hoppus became fixated on "Just Like Heaven". He began emulating Smith, wearing eyeliner and, on occasion, bright red lipstick to class.

The band developed the instrumental for "All of This" with the Cure in mind, drawing particular inspiration from "The Love Cats", which also influenced "I Miss You". As the song took shape, Tom DeLonge had the idea approach Smith about contributing. The connection was facilitated through Blink-182's longstanding relationship with the surfwear company Hurley. Paul Gomez, who managed Hurley and also worked with the Cure, approached Smith on the band's behalf. Smith was unfamiliar with much of Blink-182's work when he was approached about the collaboration. After receiving a message that the band wanted him to contribute to their new album, he consulted his teenage nieces and nephews, who were fans of the group and enthusiastically encouraged him to participate.

Blink-182 did not expect Smith to accept, in part because of the band's goofy reputation. Smith subsequently borrowed several of the band's albums from his niece and nephew and began familiarizing himself with their music. Although he found some of their material "awful" and some songs overly crass, he was surprised by the strength of others. He later recalled that his introduction to the band's music coincided with a family tragedy. While his family was gathered together, one of his nieces played a Blink-182 album in an effort to lighten the atmosphere. Still grieving, Smith found that the music had the intended effect and overall came to enjoy the band's catalog.

After hearing demos from the new album, he was doubly impressed by the band's developing sound and felt that, like the Cure earlier in their career, Blink-182 had been constrained by expectations about what kind of music they were supposed to make. He also encouraged the band not to be concerned with questions of legitimacy, telling them, "Nobody knows what kind of songs you are going to write in the future and nobody knows the full potential of any band. I really like the music you sent me". Hoppus described Smith's response as "an amazing experience, like a dream come true".

== Recording and production ==
"All of This" was assembled through an unconventional recording process across four studios on two continents. Rather than record his drum performance simultaneously, Travis Barker initially tracked the kick drum and snare together before separately overdubbing the hi-hat, ride cymbal and ribbon crasher. Tom DeLonge subsequently recorded the song's acoustic and electric guitars, while Mark Hoppus recorded the bass using a 1973 Fender Bass VI, a six-string instrument tuned an octave below a standard guitar. Hoppus used the bass because it was the same model used on the Cure's "Push". He recorded it directly into the mixing console without an amplifier. Roger Joseph Manning Jr. later contributed keyboards.

DeLonge initially recorded the first two lines of the chorus before the track was sent to Robert Smith in England, where he recorded his lead vocals remotely. Because the collaboration predated convenient large-scale digital file transfers, the band sent him a hard drive containing the recording by FedEx. The process stretched over several weeks, leaving the band uncertain whether Smith's contribution would be completed in time for the album. His recording ultimately arrived only hours before the masters were due at the manufacturing plant. Hoppus recalled that they were ecstatic upon its completion: "It gave us all goose bumps to hear Robert's voice on our record, to hear his voice on another song, and to come to the realization that we actually wrote the music to it, because it sounds like a Cure song." After Smith returned his recording, the band completed the track with additional drum fills, vocal harmonies and Mellotron.

== Music ==
"All of This" is a gothic-tinged pop song that uses strings and guitar effects to create a moody atmosphere. Smith's vulnerable vocal delivery contrasts with DeLonge's higher-pitched singing, while layered instrumentation creates an atmospheric, haunting sound. The song is composed in the key of A major and is set in time signature of common time with a moderate tempo of 112 beats per minute. The vocal range spans from A_{3} to C_{#5}.

== Reception ==
"All of This" generally received positive reviews, with critics highlighting its subdued, atmospheric sound and Smith's guest performance. Leah Greenblatt of Entertainment Weekly described it as a haunting song about lost love, while Pitchfork's Arielle Gordon characterized it as "sparse and subtle". Trevor Kelley of Alternative Press compared its sound to the Cure's Seventeen Seconds, and Nick Catucci of The Village Voice called it a "shuffling, string-gilded slow burner". Catucci particularly praised Smith's performance, arguing that he commanded greater presence than either of Blink-182's vocalists.

Other assessments similarly praised Smith's contribution. Chris Payne of Stereogum felt that Smith's drawling delivery provided greater emotional depth while contrasting effectively with DeLonge's vocals. Jeffrey S. Solochek of the Tampa Bay Times likewise called the song "terrific" and welcomed Smith's appearance as lead vocalist. Writing for Slant Magazine, Scott Shelter considered "All of This" the album's best track despite its gloominess. Some contemporary critics were less receptive. Aidin Vaziri of the San Francisco Chronicle regarded Smith's appearance as one of the band's "laughable stabs at respect" across the album, while A.D. Amorosi of The Philadelphia Inquirer dismissed the song as juvenile.

=== Potential music video ===
The band considered issuing "All of This" as the fifth single from Blink-182. While touring Japan, DeLonge encountered filmmaker M. Night Shyamalan at a hotel restaurant and approached him about directing a music video for the band. According to Hoppus, Shyamalan joined the band shortly afterward to discuss ideas and eventually developed a full treatment for the video. The concept proved prohibitively expensive, however, with Hoppus later recalling an estimated cost of around $20 million; DeLonge suggested that the project fell apart once Shyamalan became aware of the considerably smaller budgets typically afforded to music videos. Plans to release "All of This" as a single were ultimately abandoned following the band's declaration of an "indefinite hiatus" in February 2005. In 2006, Shyamalan confirmed that he had "almost" directed a video for the song and revealed that his concept would have involved vampires.

== Personnel ==
Personnel adapted from Blink-182 liner notes

Blink-182

- Tom DeLonge – acoustic guitar, electric guitar, vocals
- Mark Hoppus – Fender Bass VI, backing vocals
- Travis Barker – drums

Additional musicians

- Robert Smith – vocals
- Roger Joseph Manning Jr. – keyboards
- John Morrical – additional keyboards

Production

- Jerry Finn – producer
- Tom Lord-Alge – mix engineer
- Ryan Hewitt – recording
- Bunny Lake – vocal engineer
- Brian Gardner – mastering engineer
