= Feeling This =

2003 single by Blink-182

Single by Blink-182

from the album Blink-182
- B-side: "Violence"
- Released: October 6, 2003
- Recorded: 2003
- Studio: The Rubin's House, Signature Sound, Rolling Thunder (San Diego, California); Conway (Hollywood, California)
- Genre: Pop-punk; alternative rock
- Length: 2:54
- Label: Geffen
- Songwriters: Mark Hoppus; Tom DeLonge; Travis Barker
- Producer: Jerry Finn

Blink-182 singles chronology
"Stay Together for the Kids" (2002)	"Feeling This" (2003)	"I Miss You" (2004)

Music video
- "Feeling This" on YouTube

"Feeling This" is a song by American rock band Blink-182 for their untitled fifth studio album (2003). The song is the opening track on the album and was released as its lead single on October 6, 2003, through Geffen Records. It was written by guitarist Tom DeLonge, bassist Mark Hoppus, and drummer Travis Barker, and was produced and mixed by Jerry Finn. The song originated on the first day of producing the album. The song marked a stylistic evolution for blink-182 and was chosen as the album's lead single to introduce the band's new direction.

Combining aggressive, shouted verses with melodic harmonies and an a cappella vocal coda, the song juxtaposes lust, romance, and emotional vulnerability through alternating perspectives sung by Hoppus and DeLonge. While retaining the band's pop-punk foundation, it incorporates layered vocals, samples, Latin and hip hop-influenced rhythms, and unconventional studio production. The accompanying music video, directed by David LaChapelle and set in a dystopian reform school, reflected the darker artistic direction of the album.

"Feeling This" became another successful international release for blink-182. It peaked at number two on Billboard's Modern Rock Tracks chart, reached number 15 on the UK Singles Chart, and charted throughout Europe and Oceania. The song received critical acclaim, with reviewers praising its vocal interplay, musicianship, and energetic production. The digital single was certified gold by the Recording Industry Association of America in 2005. It has become a concert staple, opening hundreds of the band's live performances.

== Background ==
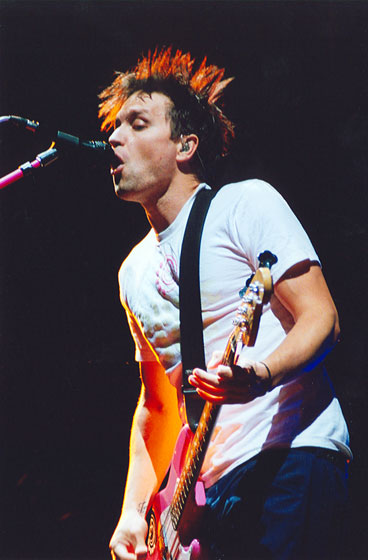
Bassist Mark Hoppus was the first to begin writing the song.

"Feeling This" was the first track that was recorded for Blink-182 in early 2003. On the first day of pre-production on the album, Blink-182 bassist Mark Hoppus asked an engineer to explain Pro Tools to him, as it was the first time the band would record their music digitally. He began recording guitar and bass parts and experimenting with the software. When guitarist Tom DeLonge and drummer Travis Barker arrived, they too began adding new tracks to the project. The song was written in one day. "I think if I sit there and try to analyze everything, what would be cool here or there, I just feel like I get so far away from what I would do, and I think your gut instinct is usually the best thing," said Barker at the time.

The lyrics were written with Hoppus and DeLonge going into separate rooms—Hoppus writing the choruses and DeLonge writing the verses. The two had not spoken to each other about the lyrics ahead of time, and it turned out that the two had both written about sex. When put together, the song represents the lustful side of sex during the verses, the passionate side in the bridge and the romantic side in the chorus, creating a juxtaposition between both voices. It has been interpreted as a description for failed romance, one that "illustrates a scenario of lust, ambivalence and regret." For Barker, the song's drum track was "super in respect to John Bonham. [...] We were kind of messing around with the verse. It’s like, 'Well, I want to do a four-bar drum intro and just see how it works for the song.' And we never second-guessed it. We were like, 'That sounds rad.'"

According to engineer Ryan Hewitt, the track contains "four distinct drum sounds created by old school tape editing." The song was recorded "part-by-part, committing to different sounds by changing relative levels, EQ, and compression throughout," and the engineers would slightly move microphones used to record Barker's drum kit to tailor the natural ambience of the home it was recorded in. Upon playback of a rough mix of the song, the engineer automated the music to fade at the song's conclusion, but mistakenly forgot to do the same for the vocal tracks. Hoppus, who had been listening to the Beach Boys at the time, liked the a cappella interplay of their voices. All agreed to keep it in the final version of the song.

== Composition ==
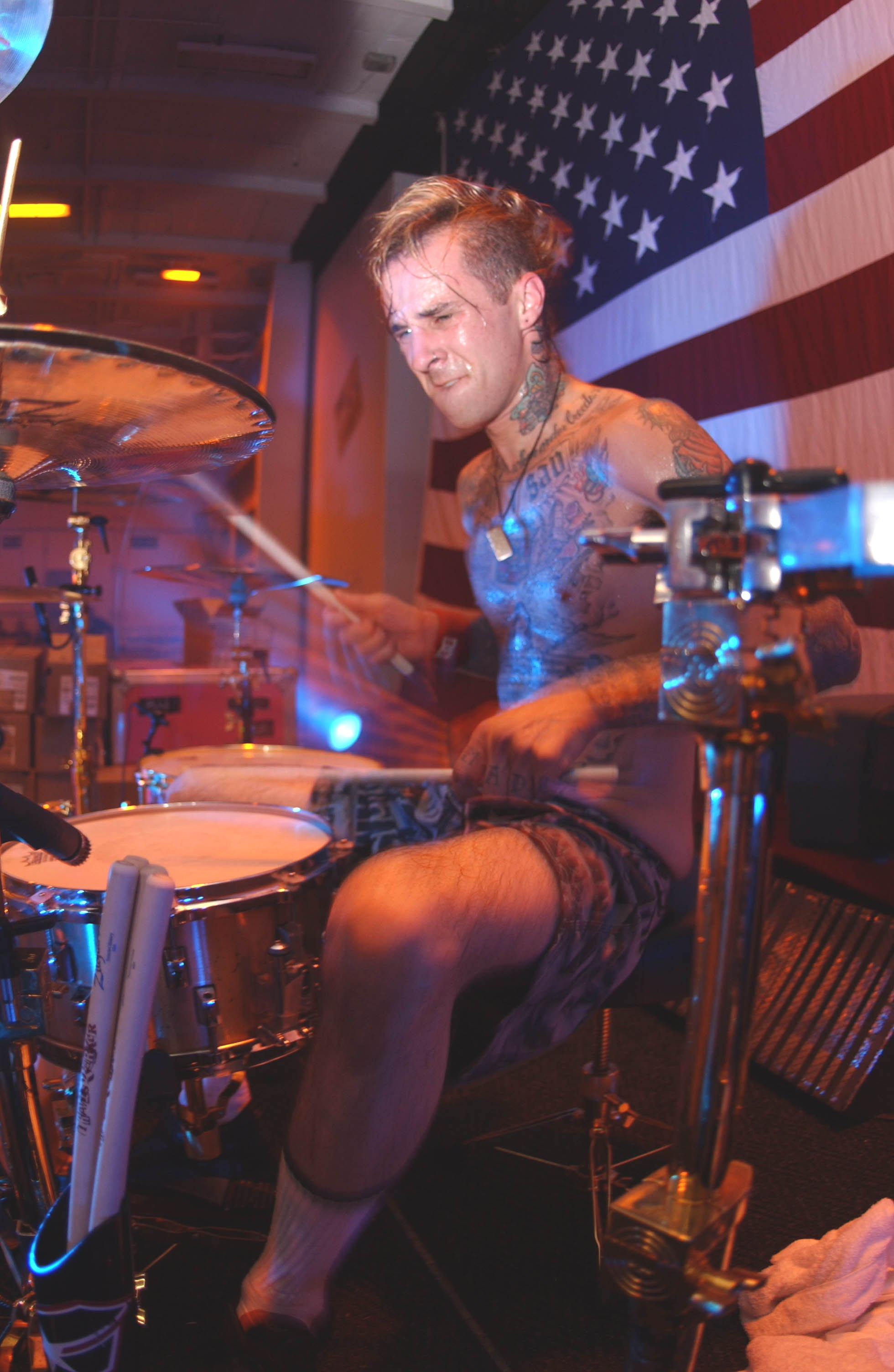
Drummer Travis Barker was influenced by John Bonham on the song.

"Feeling This"
The song's chorus, featuring notable use of a cowbell, as well as a section where co-vocalist Tom DeLonge intentionally sings off-key.

The song is composed in the key of E major and is set in time signature of common time with a tempo of 173 beats per minute. The vocal range spans from E3 to B4.

"Feeling This" opens with flanged drums. Although computer technology offered it during the album’s production, according to Hoppus, the band opted to produce the effect "the old school way", opting for two tape machines. Originally taking root as a faster-paced drum 'n' bass-inspired track, Barker imitated that genre's groove on open hi-hats. The influence of John Bonham is most explicit in the song's first few seconds, in which Barker performs eighth-note triplets on his bass drum, much like the Led Zeppelin song "Good Times Bad Times" (1969). Following a sample from Captain America (1990)—"Get ready for action!"—the song moves into a "stabbing guitar rhythm" over the verses, which are "half-barked" and contain delivery reminiscent of hip-hop. The "harmony-rich" chorus of the song, which contains the refrain "Fate fell short this time, smile fades in the summer / Place your hand in mine, I'll leave when I wanna", is replete with a "syncopated Latin-flavored backbeat." In the chorus, Barker plays a cowbell, which he initially included as a joke, believing Hoppus and DeLonge would "hate it."

The song is particularly memorable for a section of the chorus of the song (right before the bridge begins), in which guitarist Tom DeLonge sings the vocals loudly and off-key. According to the liner notes for Blink-182, DeLonge stated that the recording was done in a 30-foot-long (9.1 m) living room at the home previously mentioned, with microphones 10 to 15 feet (3.0 to 4.6 m) away. The end of the song is a melodic 3-part harmony between the band's two vocalists, both singing conflicting but harmonizing parts.

== Release ==
Blink-182 first performed "Feeling This" alongside other new songs from Blink-182 during their performances at the 2003 Reading and Leeds festivals. The band picked "Feeling This" as the first single because they felt it representative of the transition they had undergone since their fourth studio album, Take Off Your Pants and Jacket (2001). A slightly different version of the song had been released previously as part of the soundtrack for the video game Madden NFL 2004 under the erroneous title "Action". Barker explained in an interview that "'Action' just sounded kind of dorky to us. Like we would always call it 'Feeling This' and then someone at our label, I think, like wrote it as 'Action' one time and sent out singles to people. And it was always supposed to be 'Feeling This'."

To promote Blink-182, the group performed "Feeling This", as well as their past hit "Dammit" on Total Request Live on November 11, 2003, and on the late-night talk show Jimmy Kimmel Live! in November 26, 2003. Richard Cheese covered the song on their 2004 album I'd Like a Virgin.

== Commercial performance ==
Commercially, "Feeling This" became another successful international single for blink-182. In the United States, it debuted at number 40 on Billboard's Modern Rock Tracks chart on October 18, 2003, jumping to number 13 in its second week, which was at that time the fourth-biggest move in the history of that chart. The song moved upwards on the chart over the following weeks, eventually achieving a peak of number two (behind Linkin Park's hit "Numb") on November 29, 2003. It remained at number two for two more weeks before dropping to number three, after which it continued dropping before exiting the top 20 on February 21, 2004. In total, it spent twenty-six weeks on the chart. It spent eight weeks on the Bubbling Under Hot 100 Singles, which acts as an extension to the Billboard Hot 100 chart; it peaked at number two on December 20, 2003. The song remained a staple of alternative radio, placing on Billboard's year-end Modern Rock Tracks chart in both 2003 and 2004.

Internationally, it charted across Europe and Oceania, reaching number 13 in Scotland, number 20 in Australia, and the top 50 in Germany, Ireland, Italy, and the Netherlands. In the United Kingdom, "Feeling This" debuted at number 15 on the UK Singles Chart for the week ending date November 30, 2003. It dropped to number 35 the following week before exiting the chart on December 28; in all, it spent ten weeks on the chart. It also entered the national charts in Austria, France, Sweden, and Switzerland.

== Critical reception ==
"Feeling This" received favorable reviews from music critics. Kelefa Sanneh, writing for The New York Times felt the song was an "appealing hybrid," while noting the growing popularity of emo could have influenced the "more anguished" tone. Greg Kot of Entertainment Weekly praised the vocal harmonies, calling them reminiscent of Queen. Joshua Klein of The Washington Post similarly complimented the interplay between DeLonge and Hoppus and its "multiple-perspective portrait of first love." Andy Doerschuk of Drum! praised Barker's "fat, syncopated beat" and noted elements of Bonham as well as James Brown's drummers. Rolling Stone's Jenny Eliscu made note of its "catchy hooks", while Stephen Thompson, writing for The A.V. Club, considered it among many songs on the album that were "straightforwardly conventional."

Retrospective critics have also highlighted the song's enduring appeal. Nick Catucci in Rolling Stone dubbed it "peak Blink," praising its combination of romantic longing, anxiety, and "irresistibly singable" melodies. In a fan poll conducted by Alternative Press, "Feeling This" ranked fifth among blink-182's best songs. The magazine described it as a "rollicking anthem" that captured both "the excitement and the exhilaration as well as the anxiety" of sex, while praising its "catchiest" chorus. Writing for Stereogum, Chris Payne noted that it had served as the opening song at hundreds of blink-182 concerts, and praised its energetic opening: "The first seconds of "Feeling This" still hit like a free Rockstar tallboy you've waited an hour for in the Warped Tour heat."

== Music video ==
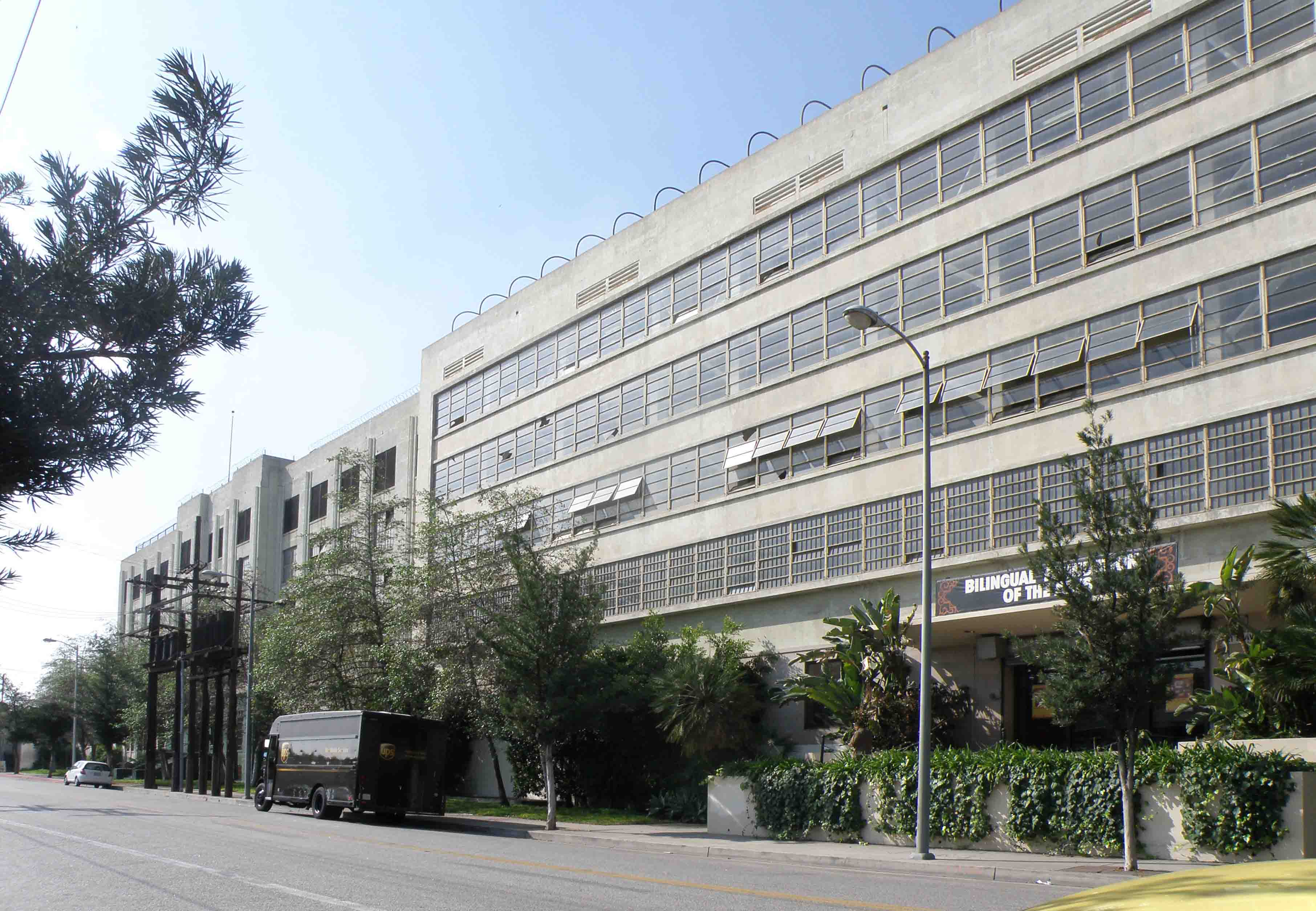
The clip was shot at the abandoned Lincoln Heights Jail north of downtown Los Angeles.

The video follows students at a dystopian-based correctional facility who rebel and take over the establishment, intertwined with shots of the band performing outside the prison in a cage, providing a "soundtrack to the chaos." Hoppus described their idea for the facility: "It's kind of a combination of prep school and reform school, and it's very repressed and kids are being held down. There is a lot of authority and a lot of strict regimen, and the kids lash out and take over the school and destroy the place." The band's main goal for the video was for it to resemble an art piece, much in the same way they viewed the production of the album, to keep in line with tone. To this end, they enlisted director David LaChapelle. LaChapelle's input—which "ranges from an evil prison warden cracking a whip at marching school kids to escapees ripping their uniforms and doing acrobatic moves down the hallways"—was regarded by the band as "completely wacked out and twisted, which is exactly what we love."

In the narrative, the boys and girls are separated at the school and sexually repressed, and release their energies when they meet between a glass window. The entire music video was shot on September 30, 2003, at the abandoned Lincoln Heights Jail north of downtown Los Angeles, only a few days ahead of its premiere.

== Formats and track listings ==
All songs were written and composed by Tom DeLonge, Mark Hoppus and Travis Barker, except where noted.

US CD (2003) (981432-0)

1. "Feeling This" – 2:56
2. "Violence" – 3:48
3. "The Rock Show" (Live in Chicago) – 3:08
4. "Carousel" (Live in Chicago) – 2:55 (DeLonge/Hoppus)

US 7-inch single (2003) (B0001518-21)

1. "Feeling This" – 2:56
2. "Violence" – 3:48

UK CD (2003) (981432-0)

1. "Feeling This" – 2:56
2. "The Rock Show" (Live in Chicago) – 3:08

== Credits and personnel ==
Credits are adapted from the liner notes of Blink-182.

Blink-182

- Mark Hoppus – bass guitar, vocals, sampling
- Tom DeLonge – guitar, vocals
- Travis Barker – drums, cowbell

Production

- Jerry Finn – producer, mix engineer
- Ryan Hewitt – engineer
- Brian Gardner – mastering engineer
- Max Gramajo – cover illustration
- Rick DeVoe – management

== Charts ==
=== Weekly charts ===
Weekly chart performance for "Feeling This"
Chart (2003–2004)	Peak position
Australia (ARIA)	20
Austria (Ö3 Austria Top 40)	65
CIS Airplay (TopHit)	109
France (SNEP)	56
Germany (GfK)	49
Ireland (IRMA)	46
Italy (FIMI)	45
Netherlands (Dutch Top 40)	35
Netherlands (Single Top 100)	85
Russia Airplay (TopHit)	106
Scottish Singles Sales (Official Charts)	13
Sweden (Sverigetopplistan)	60
Switzerland (Schweizer Hitparade)	60
UK Singles (Official Charts)	15
UK Rock & Metal (Official Charts)	2
US Bubbling Under Hot 100 (Billboard)	2
US Modern Rock Tracks (Billboard)	2

=== Year-end charts ===
Year-end chart performance for "Feeling This"
Chart (2003)	Position
CIS Airplay (TopHit)	190
Russia Airplay (TopHit)	181
US Modern Rock Tracks (Billboard)	74

Chart (2004)	Position
US Modern Rock Tracks (Billboard)	30

== Certifications ==
Certifications and sales for "Feeling This"
Region	Certification	Certified units/sales
New Zealand (RMNZ)	Gold	15,000^{‡}
United Kingdom (BPI)	Silver	200,000^{‡}
United States (RIAA)	Gold	500,000^{*}
^{*} Sales figures based on certification alone.^{‡} Sales+streaming figures based on certification alone.

== Release history ==
Release dates and formats for "Feeling This"
Region	Date	Format(s)	Label	Ref.
United States	October 6, 2003	Alternative radio	Geffen	
United States	October 6, 2003	Active rock radio	Geffen	
Australia	November 10, 2003	CD	Geffen	
United Kingdom	November 24, 2003	7-inch vinyl; CD	Geffen	
