= Drum solo =

Single-drummer performance

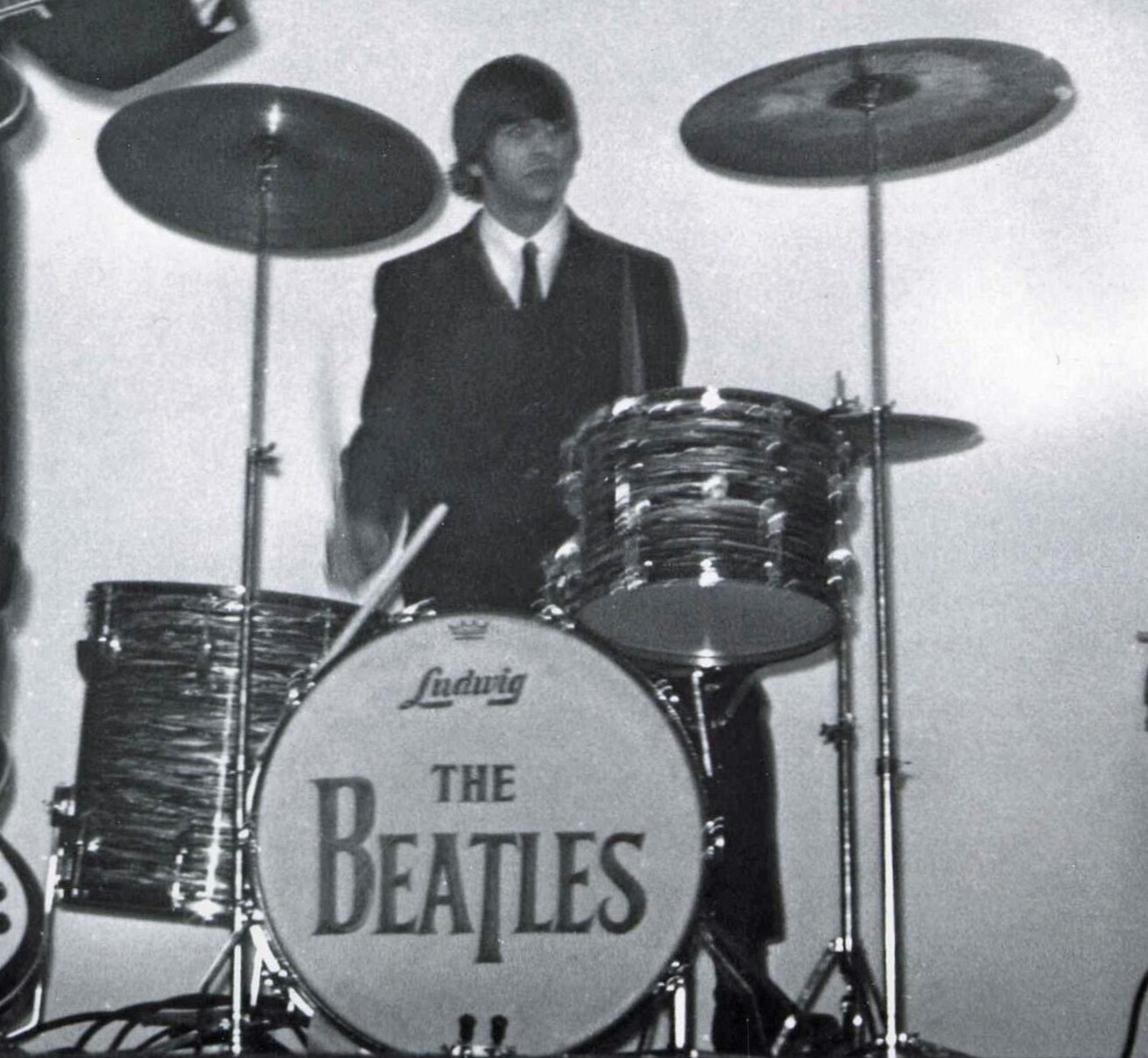
Ringo Starr (pictured), drummer of the Beatles, performed his only drum solo with the Beatles on "The End"

A drum solo is an instrumental solo played on a drum kit. A drum solo may be set or improvised, and of any length, up to being the main performance. In rock, drum solos are unique in that traditionally they are minimally or never accompanied, whereas other instruments may play solos accompanied or unaccompanied. They are also typically free-form in that they do not necessarily adhere to the tempo, style or structure of the song they accompany.

In jazz, drum solos more typically adhere strictly to the tempo and form of the song, and may be accompanied sporadically by the other instruments; they may also "trade fours", or take alternating four-bar solos with the rest of the band. They may also trade eights, twelves (in the case of a blues), twos, single bars, or full choruses.

A drum lift is a passage in which singing is backed only by the drums and no other music. It is not normally considered a solo, as the primary focus remains on the singing; however, it bears some similarity to a solo. A drum lift may be set or improvised, simple or elaborate, and may vary in length from part of a line to an entire verse.

In marching band or drum corps, a drum section feature allows the remainder of the ensemble to create challenging formations without having to play their instruments at the same time, as depicted by the movie Drumline. In years past, the drum solo was a standalone work. Beginning in the mid-to-late 1980s, however, drum solos, even extended ones, tended to be integrated into the overall flow of the music. This occurred earlier—such as in the 1976 Blue Devils show (in "Channel One Suite", mimicking the drum break in the Buddy Rich original), but as time passed and show flow became more important, the stand-alone solo became less popular and is rarely heard in contemporary music.

== Drum solo competitions ==
The largest drum solo competition in the world occurred each year at Guitar Center stores across the United States, with winners competing for a $25,000 prize. However, this competition has been on indefinite hiatus since 2017.

Other drum solo competitions are hosted by either instrument manufacturers, as a component of drum seminars and conventions, or held by individual music stores throughout the world. For example, Roland Corporation, a manufacturer of electronic drums, hosts an annual competition for performing on its V-Drum kit.

== See also ==
- "Moby Dick" by John Bonham of rock band Led Zeppelin, which could go on for 30 minutes
- Guitar solo
