= Blink-182 discography =

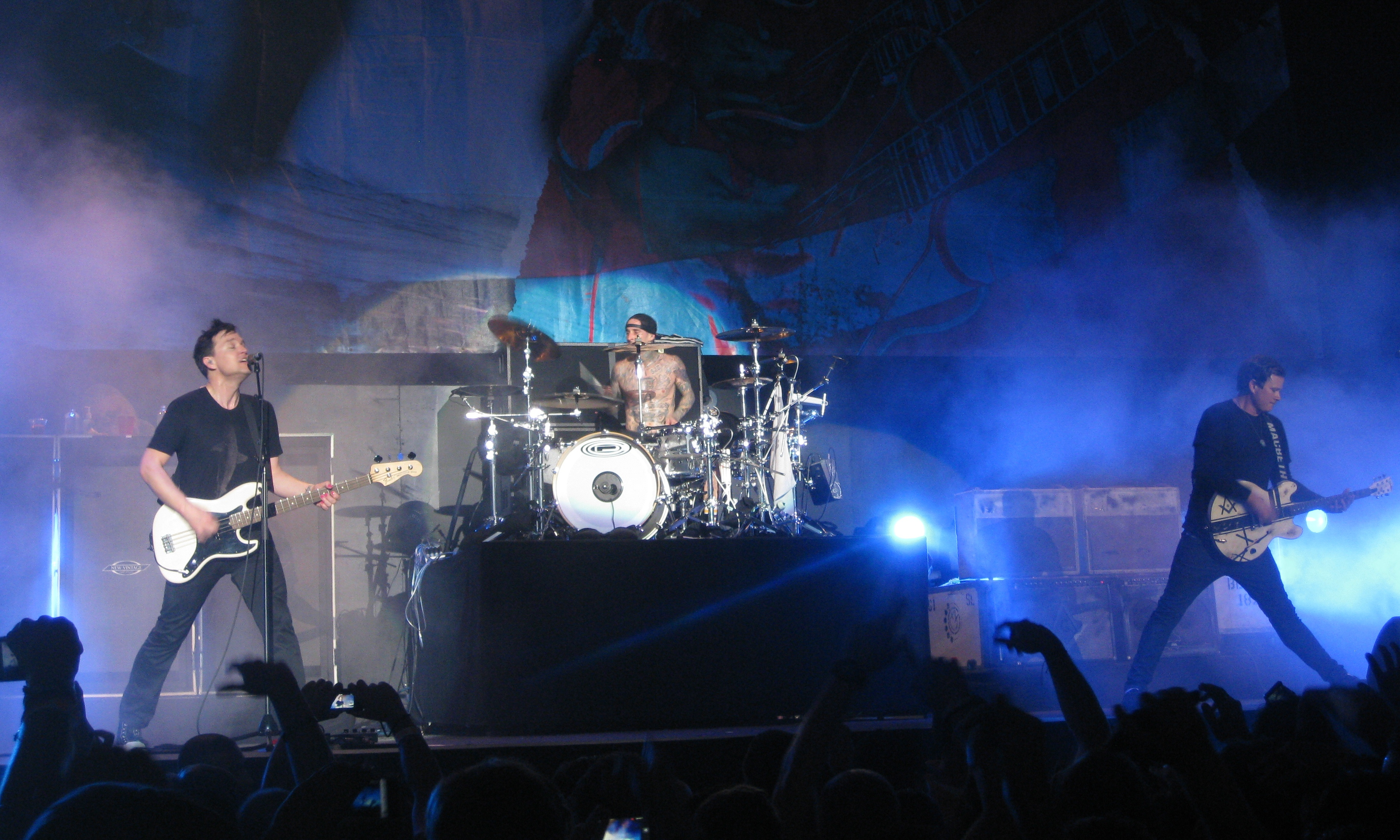
- Blink-182 in San Diego, 2011
- Studio albums: 9
- Extended plays: 2
- Live albums: 1
- Compilation albums: 2
- Singles: 36
- Video albums: 3
- Music videos: 32
- Promotional singles: 12
- Splits: 2
- Demos: 3
- Guest appearances: 3

This is the discography of Blink-182, an American rock band. They have released nine studio albums, one live album, two compilation albums, three video albums, two extended plays (EPs), twenty-four singles, six promotional singles, and thirty-two music videos. Their recording material was distributed mainly by subdivisions of Universal Music Group, including MCA Records, Geffen Records, Interscope Records, and DGC Records. They have also released material under independent labels such as Cargo Music, its subdivision Grilled Cheese, Kung Fu Records and BMG. The band currently consists of bassist and vocalist Mark Hoppus, drummer Travis Barker, and guitarist and vocalist Tom DeLonge. Founded by Hoppus, guitarist and vocalist Tom DeLonge, and drummer Scott Raynor, the band emerged from the Southern California punk scene of the early 1990s and first gained notoriety for high-energy live shows and irreverent lyrical toilet humor. Blink-182 has sold 15.3 million albums in the United States, and over 50 million albums worldwide. The band is known for bringing the genre of pop punk into the mainstream.

The band recorded three demos, including the commercially available Buddha, before signing to San Diego–based independent label Cargo Music in 1994. Cargo issued the band's debut album, Cheshire Cat, in 1995. The band signed with major label MCA Records to co-distribute 1997's Dude Ranch. The album was their first to chart on the Billboard 200, peaking at number 67. Dude Ranch also featured their first radio hit, "Dammit", which helped the album reach Platinum status in the United States. The following album, Enema of the State (1999), was met with more commercial success, reaching top ten positions in several countries, including the United States. Its singles, "What's My Age Again?", "All the Small Things", and "Adam's Song", became airplay and MTV staples. "All the Small Things" became the most successful of the three, reaching number-one on the Alternative Songs chart, but also became a crossover hit and peaked at number six on the Billboard Hot 100 chart. Enema of the State is Blink-182's most successful album, certified five times platinum in the United States for having shipped five million units. It has sold over 15 million worldwide.

Their fourth album, Take Off Your Pants and Jacket (2001), reached the number-one spot in the United States, Canada, and Germany. In its first week, the album sold more than 350,000 copies in the United States, eventually being certified double Platinum by the RIAA. The first two singles, ("The Rock Show" and "First Date") achieved moderate success internationally, while its third and final single "Stay Together for the Kids" had a weaker impact. The eponymously titled Blink-182 followed in 2003 and marked a stylistic shift for the group, infusing experimental elements into their usual pop punk formula, resulting in a more mature sound. The album spawned four singles: "Feeling This", "I Miss You", "Down", and "Always", with "I Miss You" having the greatest success and narrowly missing the top 40 of the Billboard Hot 100. "Feeling This" and "I Miss You", along with "All the Small Things" and "Bored To Death", remain the best-selling of the group's singles, which have all been certified Gold by the RIAA. DeLonge left the group in 2005, sending the band into what was termed an "indefinite hiatus." The band’s first Greatest Hits album was released in October of the same year.

The trio reunited in 2009, and their sixth studio album, Neighborhoods, was released in 2011. While it was a top ten success on many charts around the globe, it did not prove to be as successful as their last album, and its singles "Up All Night" and "After Midnight" had weaker success on the charts in comparison to previous releases. Dogs Eating Dogs, an extended play containing new material, was self-released by the band after they departed their record label DGC in 2012, whom the group had been with since they reunited. After a second falling-out with DeLonge which resulted in his departure in January 2015, the band recruited Alkaline Trio's Matt Skiba as a replacement. The album's production was expedited without DeLonge, and their seventh record California was released in 2016. It was the band's first album to reach number-one on any chart since before the band's breakup, and their first ever in the UK; and each song from the album managed to reach chart positions in the US and the UK. The band's eighth studio album, Nine, was released on September 20, 2019.

Upon DeLonge's return to the band in 2022, a new album was announced to be in the works, with the lead single "Edging" releasing on October 14, 2022. The band's ninth studio album, One More Time... was announced on September 18, 2023, and released on October 20, 2023. The album's title track was released on September 21, 2023, along with a third single titled "More Than You Know". The fourth single of the album, "Dance with Me", was released on October 5, with the fifth single "Fell in Love" released on October 13, 2023, and the sixth single, "You Don't Know What You've Got", following on October 18, 2023. One More Time... became the band's third number-one album on the Billboard 200. The single "One More Time" became one of the band's biggest modern radio singles in the US, where it peaked for a record-setting 20 weeks atop Billboard's Alternative Airplay chart; it also became their first crossover hit since 2004's "I Miss You", ultimately reaching Gold certification on December 5, 2024.

== Albums ==
=== Studio albums ===
List of studio albums, with selected chart positions, sales figures and certifications
| Title | Album details | Peak chart positions | | | | | | | | | | Sales | Certifications |
| Title | Album details | US | AUS | AUT | CAN | GER | IRL | ITA | NZ | SWI | UK | Sales | Certifications |
|---|---|---|---|---|---|---|---|---|---|---|---|---|---|
| Cheshire Cat | Released: February 17, 1995; Label: Cargo / Grilled Cheese; Formats: CD, cassette, LP | — | 73 | — | — | — | — | — | 27 | — | 187 | | BPI: Silver |
| Dude Ranch | Released: June 17, 1997; Label: MCA / Cargo; Formats: CD, cassette, LP | 67 | 25 | — | 42 | — | — | — | — | — | 100 | US: 1,100,000 | RIAA: Platinum; ARIA: Platinum; BPI: Gold; MC: 2× Platinum |
| Enema of the State | Released: June 1, 1999; Label: MCA; Formats: CD, cassette, LP | 9 | 4 | 6 | 7 | 18 | 31 | 5 | 2 | 13 | 15 | WW: 15,000,000; US: 4,600,000; UK: 537,100 | RIAA: 5× Platinum; ARIA: 2× Platinum; BPI: Platinum; FIMI: Platinum; IFPI AUT: Gold; IFPI SWI: Gold; MC: 4× Platinum; RMNZ: 2× Platinum |
| Take Off Your Pants and Jacket | Released: June 12, 2001; Label: MCA; Formats: CD, cassette, LP | 1 | 2 | 3 | 1 | 1 | 10 | 4 | 10 | 4 | 4 | UK: 453,000 | RIAA: 2× Platinum; ARIA: Platinum; BPI: Platinum; BVMI: Gold; IFPI SWI: Gold; MC: 2× Platinum |
| Blink-182 | Released: November 18, 2003; Label: Geffen; Formats: CD, cassette, LP, digital download | 3 | 7 | 16 | 1 | 14 | 18 | 26 | 10 | 17 | 22 | US: 2,200,000 | RIAA: Platinum; ARIA: 2× Platinum; BPI: 2× Platinum; BVMI: Gold; MC: 2× Platinum; RMNZ: Gold |
| Neighborhoods | Released: September 27, 2011; Label: DGC; Formats: CD, LP, digital download | 2 | 2 | 7 | 2 | 6 | 12 | 11 | 3 | 11 | 6 | US: 353,000 | ARIA: Gold; BPI: Gold |
| California | Released: July 1, 2016; Label: BMG; Formats: CD, cassette, LP, digital download | 1 | 2 | 2 | 1 | 3 | 5 | 4 | 4 | 3 | 1 | US: 172,000 | RIAA: Gold; ARIA: Gold; BPI: Gold; MC: Gold |
| Nine | Released: September 20, 2019; Label: Columbia; Formats: CD, cassette, LP, digital download | 3 | 4 | 8 | 5 | 4 | 23 | 11 | 21 | 13 | 6 | US: 77,000 | |
| One More Time... | Released: October 20, 2023; Label: Columbia; Formats: CD, cassette, LP, digital download | 1 | 2 | 2 | 2 | 2 | 3 | 3 | 5 | 2 | 2 | US: 247,000 | BPI: Silver; MC: Gold |
"—" denotes a recording that did not chart or was not released in that territory.

=== Live albums ===
List of live albums, with selected chart positions, sales figures and certifications
| Title | Album details | Peak chart positions | | | | | | | | | | Certifications |
| Title | Album details | US | AUS | AUT | BEL | CAN | GER | IRL | NZ | SWI | UK | Certifications |
|---|---|---|---|---|---|---|---|---|---|---|---|---|
| The Mark, Tom and Travis Show (The Enema Strikes Back!) | Released: November 7, 2000; Label: MCA; Formats: CD, cassette, LP | 8 | 6 | 38 | 4 | 4 | 43 | 10 | 10 | 36 | 69 | RIAA: Gold; ARIA: Platinum; BPI: Gold; MC: Platinum; RMNZ: Gold |

=== Compilation albums ===
List of compilation albums, with selected chart positions, sales figures and certifications
| Title | Album details | Peak chart positions | | | | | | | | | | Sales | Certifications |
| Title | Album details | US | AUS | AUT | BEL | CAN | GER | IRL | NZ | SWI | UK | Sales | Certifications |
|---|---|---|---|---|---|---|---|---|---|---|---|---|---|
| Greatest Hits | Released: October 31, 2005; Label: Geffen; Formats: CD, LP, digital download | 6 | 4 | 21 | 61 | 3 | 26 | 22 | 23 | 45 | 6 | UK: 918,421 | ARIA: 3× Platinum; BPI: 3× Platinum; BVMI: Platinum; MC: Platinum |
| Icon | Released: March 19, 2013; Label: Geffen; Formats: CD | — | — | — | — | — | — | — | — | — | — | | |
"—" denotes a recording that did not chart or was not released in that territory.

== Extended plays ==
List of extended plays, with selected chart positions and certifications
| Title | Extended play details | Peak chart positions | |
| Title | Extended play details | US | CAN |
|---|---|---|---|
| They Came to Conquer... Uranus | Released: February, 1996; Label: Cargo / Grilled Cheese; Formats: 7" vinyl | — | — |
| Dogs Eating Dogs | Released: December 18, 2012; Label: Self-released; Formats: Digital download, 10" vinyl | 23 | 21 |
"—" denotes a recording that did not chart or was not released in that territory.

=== Demos ===
List of demos
| Title | Album details | Peak chart positions |
| Title | Album details | AUS |
|---|---|---|
| Flyswatter | Released: May 1993; Label: Self-released; Formats: Cassette | — |
| 21 Days | Released: 1993; Label: Self-released; Formats: Cassette | — |
| Buddha | Released: January 1994; Label: Filter/Kung Fu; Formats: Cassette, vinyl, CD | 78 |

=== Splits ===
List of splits
| Title | Extended play details | Other artist(s) |
|---|---|---|
| Short Bus | Released: 1994; Formats: 7" vinyl | The Iconoclasts |
| Lemmings / Going Nowhere | Released: November 23, 1996; Label: Cargo / Grilled Cheese; Formats: 7" vinyl | Swindle |

== Singles ==
=== As lead artist ===
==== 1990s ====
List of singles released in the 1990s, with selected chart positions and certifications, showing year released and album name
| Title | Year | Peak chart positions | | | | | | | | | | Certifications | Album |
| Title | Year | US | US Alt. | AUS | CAN | GER | IRL | ITA | SWE | SWI | UK | Certifications | Album |
|---|---|---|---|---|---|---|---|---|---|---|---|---|---|
| "M+M's" | 1995 | — | — | — | — | — | — | — | — | — | — | | Cheshire Cat |
| "Wasting Time" | 1996 | — | — | 90 | — | — | — | — | — | — | — | | Cheshire Cat |
| "Apple Shampoo" | 1997 | — | — | 90 | — | — | — | — | — | — | — | | Dude Ranch |
| "Dammit" | 1997 | — (Note: "Dammit" did not enter the Billboard Hot 100, but did peak at number 61 on the US Billboard Hot 100 Airplay chart.) | 11 | 34 | — | — | — | — | — | — | — | BPI: Silver; RMNZ: Platinum | Dude Ranch |
| "Dick Lips" | 1998 | — | — | — | — | — | — | — | — | — | — | | Dude Ranch |
| "Josie" | 1998 | — | — | 31 | — | — | — | — | — | — | — | | Dude Ranch |
| "What's My Age Again?" | 1999 | 58 | 2 | 42 | 42 | 80 | 34 | 4 | 44 | 52 | 17 | BPI: 2× Platinum; BVMI: Gold; FIMI: Platinum; RMNZ: 3× Platinum | Enema of the State |
| "All the Small Things" | 1999 | 6 | 1 | 8 | 4 | 18 | 11 | 7 | 7 | 14 | 2 | ARIA: Platinum; BPI: 4× Platinum; BVMI: Platinum; IFPI SWE: Gold; RMNZ: 5× Platinum | Enema of the State |
"—" denotes a recording that did not chart or was not released in that territory.

==== 2000s ====
List of singles released in the 2000s, with selected chart positions and certifications, showing year released and album name
| Title | Year | Peak chart positions | | | | | | | | | | Certifications | Album |
| Title | Year | US | US Alt. | AUS | AUT | CAN | GER | IRL | SWE | SWI | UK | Certifications | Album |
|---|---|---|---|---|---|---|---|---|---|---|---|---|---|
| "Adam's Song" | 2000 | — (Note: "Adam's Song" did not enter the Billboard Hot 100, but peaked at number 1 on the Bubbling Under Hot 100 Singles chart, which acts as a 25-song extension to the Hot 100.) | 2 | 72 | — | — | 98 | — | — | — | — | BPI: Gold; RMNZ: Platinum | Enema of the State |
| "Man Overboard" | 2000 | — (Note: "Man Overboard" did not enter the Billboard Hot 100, but peaked at number 17 on the Bubbling Under Hot 100 Singles chart, which acts as a 25-song extension to the Hot 100.) | 2 | 40 | — | — | — | — | — | — | — | | The Mark, Tom, and Travis Show (The Enema Strikes Back!) |
| "The Rock Show" | 2001 | 71 | 2 | 34 | 38 | 24 | 55 | 28 | 39 | 84 | 14 | BPI: Platinum; RMNZ: Gold | Take Off Your Pants and Jacket |
| "First Date" | 2001 | — (Note: "First Date" did not enter the Billboard Hot 100, but peaked at number 6 on the Bubbling Under Hot 100 Singles chart, which acts as a 25-song extension to the Hot 100.) | 6 | 50 | 69 | — | 74 | 47 | 48 | 92 | 31 | BPI: Platinum; RMNZ: Platinum | Take Off Your Pants and Jacket |
| "I Won't Be Home for Christmas" (Note: "I Won't Be Home for Christmas" was released twice, first as a single in 1997 and again solely in Canada in 2001.) | 2001 | — (Note: "I Won't Be Home for Christmas" did not enter the Billboard Hot 100, but did peak at number 34 on the US Billboard Hot Singles Sales chart.) | — | — | — | 1 | — | — | — | — | — | | Non-album single |
| "Stay Together for the Kids" | 2002 | — (Note: "Stay Together for the Kids" did not enter the Billboard Hot 100, but peaked at number 16 on the Bubbling Under Hot 100 Singles chart, which acts as a 25-song extension to the Hot 100.) | 7 | 66 | — | — | 73 | — | — | 85 | 117 | BPI: Silver | Take Off Your Pants and Jacket |
| "Feeling This" | 2003 | — (Note: "Feeling This" did not enter the Billboard Hot 100, but peaked at number 2 on the Bubbling Under Hot 100 Singles chart, which acts as a 25-song extension to the Hot 100.) | 2 | 20 | 65 | — | 49 | 46 | 60 | 60 | 15 | RIAA: Gold; BPI: Silver | Blink-182 |
| "I Miss You" | 2004 | 42 | 1 | 13 | 41 | 15 | 32 | 20 | 55 | 51 | 8 | RIAA: Gold; ARIA: Gold; BPI: 2× Platinum; BVMI: Gold; RMNZ: 3× Platinum | Blink-182 |
| "Down" | 2004 | — | 10 | 35 | 59 | — | 76 | — | — | 33 | 24 | | Blink-182 |
| "Always" | 2004 | — | 39 | 45 | — | — | 96 | — | — | — | 36 | BPI: Silver | Blink-182 |
| "Not Now" | 2005 | — | 18 | — | — | — | — | 49 | — | — | 30 | | Greatest Hits |
"—" denotes a recording that did not chart or was not released in that territory.

==== 2010s ====
List of singles released in the 2010s, with selected chart positions and certifications, showing year released and album name
| Title | Year | Peak chart positions | | | | | | | | | | Certifications | Album |
| Title | Year | US | US Alt. | US Rock | AUS | BEL (FL) | CAN | CAN Rock | MEX | SCO | UK | Certifications | Album |
|---|---|---|---|---|---|---|---|---|---|---|---|---|---|
| "Up All Night" | 2011 | 65 | 3 | 6 | 30 | — | 58 | 13 | 34 | 35 | 48 | | Neighborhoods |
| "After Midnight" | 2011 | 88 | 7 | 20 | — | — | — | 31 | 48 | — | — | | Neighborhoods |
| "Bored to Death" | 2016 | 85 | 1 | 6 | 50 | 79 | 79 | 2 | 48 | 53 | 107 | RIAA: Gold; ARIA: Gold; MC: Platinum | California |
| "She's Out of Her Mind" | 2016 | — | 2 | 11 | — | — | — | 2 | — | — | — | MC: Gold | California |
| "Home Is Such a Lonely Place" | 2017 | — | 32 | 29 | — | — | — | — | — | — | — | | California |
| "Blame It on My Youth" | 2019 | — | 11 | 9 | — | — | — | 11 | 24 | — | — | | Nine |
| "Generational Divide" | 2019 | — | — | 32 | — | — | — | — | — | — | — | | Nine |
| "Happy Days" | 2019 | — | — (Note: "Happy Days" did not enter the Alternative Songs chart, but peaked at number 12 on the Alternative Digital Songs chart.) | — (Note: "Happy Days" did not enter the Hot Rock & Alternative Songs chart, but peaked at number 17 on the Rock Digital Songs chart.) | — | — | — | — | — | — | — | | Nine |
| "Darkside" | 2019 | — | — (Note: "Darkside" did not enter the Alternative Songs chart, but peaked at number 4 on the Alternative Digital Songs chart.) | 7 | — (Note: "Darkside" did not enter the Australian ARIA Singles Chart but peaked at number 43 on the ARIA Digital Track Chart.) | — | — | — | — | — | — | | Nine |
| "I Really Wish I Hated You" | 2019 | — | 13 | 4 | — | — | — | 33 | — | — | — | | Nine |
| "Not Another Christmas Song" | 2019 | — | — (Note: "Not Another Christmas Song" did not enter the Alternative Songs chart, but peaked at number 12 on the Alternative Digital Songs chart.) | — (Note: "Not Another Christmas Song" did not enter the Hot Rock & Alternative Songs chart, but peaked at number 16 on the Rock Digital Songs chart.) | — | — (Note: "Not Another Christmas Song" did not enter the Flanders Ultratop 50, but charted as an "extra tip" on the Ultratip chart.) | — | — | — | — | — | | Non-album single |
"—" denotes a recording that did not chart or was not released in that territory.

==== 2020s ====
List of singles released in the 2020s, with selected chart positions, showing year released and album name
| Title | Year | Peak chart positions | | | | | | | | | | Certifications | Album |
| Title | Year | US | US Alt. | US Rock | AUS | CAN | GER DL | IRL | NZ Hot | UK | WW | Certifications | Album |
|---|---|---|---|---|---|---|---|---|---|---|---|---|---|
| "Quarantine" | 2020 | — | — (Note: "Quarantine" did not enter the Alternative Songs chart, but peaked at number 11 on the Alternative Digital Songs chart.) | 46 | — | — | — | — | 39 | — | — | | Non-album single |
| "Edging" | 2022 | 61 | 1 | 7 | 50 | 25 | 20 | 63 | 7 | 31 | 78 | | One More Time... |
| "One More Time" / "More Than You Know" | 2023 | 62 | 1 | 10 | 51 | 41 | 18 | 70 | 9 | 28 | 105 | RIAA: Gold | One More Time... |
| "One More Time" / "More Than You Know" | 2023 | — | — (Note: "More Than You Know" did not enter the Alternative Songs chart, but peaked at number 8 on the Alternative Digital Songs chart.) | 41 | — (Note: "More Than You Know" did not enter the Australian ARIA Singles Chart but peaked at number 19 on the ARIA Digital Track Chart.) | — | — | — | 28 | 99 | — | | One More Time... |
| "Dance with Me" | 2023 | — | — (Note: "Dance with Me" did not enter the Alternative Songs chart, but peaked at number 11 on the Alternative Digital Songs chart.) | 28 | — | — (Note: "Dance with Me" did not enter the Canadian Hot 100 but peaked at number 37 on the Canadian Hot Digital Songs chart.) | 51 | — | 23 | 55 | — | | One More Time... |
| "Fell in Love" | 2023 | — | — (Note: "Fell In Love" did not enter the Alternative Songs chart, but peaked at number 23 on the Hot Alternative Songs chart.) | 34 | — (Note: "Fell In Love" did not enter the Australian ARIA Singles Chart but peaked at number 49 on the ARIA Digital Track Chart.) | — | — | — | 35 | — (Note: "Fell In Love" did not enter the UK Singles Chart, but peaked at number 78 on the UK Singles Sales Chart.) | — | | One More Time... |
| "You Don't Know What You've Got" | 2023 | — | — | 49 | — | — | — | — | — | — | — | | One More Time... |
| "All in My Head" / "No Fun" | 2024 | — | 7 | 45 | — | — | — (Note: "All In My Head" did not enter the German Singles Downloads Chart, but peaked at number 41 on the Germany Airplay Chart.) | — | 23 | — (Note: "All In My Head" did not enter the UK Singles Chart, but peaked at number 34 on the UK Rock & Metal Singles Chart.) | — | | One More Time... Part-2 |
| "All in My Head" / "No Fun" | 2024 | — | — | — | — | — | — | — | — | — | — | | One More Time... Part-2 |
| "Take Me In" | 2024 | — | 29 | — (Note: "Take Me In" did not enter the Rock Songs chart, but peaked at number 9 on the Rock Digital Songs chart.) | — | — | — | — | — | — (Note: "Take Me In" did not enter the UK Singles Chart, but peaked at number 58 on the UK Singles Sales Chart.) (Note: "Take Me In" did not enter the UK Singles Chart, but peaked at number 57 on the UK Singles Downloads Chart.) | — | | One More Time... Part-2 |
"—" denotes a recording that did not chart or was not released in that territory.

=== As featured artist ===
List of singles as featured artist, with selected chart positions and certifications, showing year released and album name
| Title | Year | Peak chart positions | | | Album |
| Title | Year | US Alt. | US Rock | US Dance | Album |
|---|---|---|---|---|---|
| "Why Are We So Broken" (Steve Aoki featuring Blink-182) | 2018 | — | — | 36 | Neon Future III |
| "Scumbag" (Goody Grace featuring Blink-182) | 2019 | 28 | — (Note: "Scumbag" did not enter the Hot Rock & Alternative Songs chart, but peaked at number 41 on the Rock & Alternative Airplay chart.) | — | Don’t Forget Where You Came From |
| "P.S. I Hope You're Happy" (The Chainsmokers featuring Blink-182) | 2019 | — (Note: "P.S. I Hope You're Happy" did not enter the Alternative Songs chart, but peaked at number 11 on the Alternative Digital Songs chart.) | 21 | 16 | World War Joy |
| "Let Me Down" (Oliver Tree featuring Blink-182) | 2020 | — | — | — | Ugly Is Beautiful |
"—" denotes items which were not released in that country or failed to chart.

=== Promotional singles ===
List of promotional singles, with selected chart positions, showing year released and album name
| Title | Year | Peak chart positions | | | | | | Album |
| Title | Year | US Alt. DL | US Pop | US Rock | MEX | UK Indie | UK Rock | Album |
|---|---|---|---|---|---|---|---|---|
| "Family Reunion" | 1999 | — | — | × | × | — | — | Non-album song |
| "Dumpweed" (Live) | 2000 | — | — | × | × | — | — | The Mark, Tom and Travis Show (The Enema Strikes Back!) |
| "Another Girl, Another Planet" | 2005 | — | 99 | × | × | — | — | Greatest Hits |
| "Wishing Well" | 2011 | — | — | — | — | — | — | Neighborhoods |
| "Rabbit Hole" | 2016 | 18 | — | 19 | 42 | — | 18 | California |
| "No Future" | 2016 | 23 | — | 23 | — | 40 | 7 | California |
| "Parking Lot" | 2017 | — | — | 34 | — | — | — | California (deluxe edition) |
| "Misery" | 2017 | 17 | — | 23 | — | — | 8 | California (deluxe edition) |
| "Can't Get You More Pregnant" | 2017 | — | — | — | — | — | — | California (deluxe edition) |
| "6/8" | 2017 | — | — | — | — | — | — | California (deluxe edition) |
| "Wildfire" | 2017 | — | — | — | — | — | — | California (deluxe edition) |
| "What's My Age Again? / A Milli"(Blink-182 and Lil Wayne) | 2019 | — | — | — | — | — | — | Non-album single |
"—" denotes items which were not released in that country or failed to chart. "×" denotes periods where charts did not exist or were not archived

== Other charted songs ==
List of songs, with selected chart positions, showing year released and album name
| Title | Year | Peak chart positions | | | | | | | | | | Album |
| Title | Year | US Bub. | US Alt. DL | US Rock | CAN | IRL | NZ Hot | UK Indie | UK Rock | UK | US Alt. | Album |
|---|---|---|---|---|---|---|---|---|---|---|---|---|
| "Ghost on the Dance Floor" | 2011 | — | 17 | — (Note: "Ghost on the Dance Floor" did not enter the Rock Songs chart, but peaked at number 28 on the Rock Digital Songs chart.) | — | — | — | — | — | — | — | Neighborhoods |
| "Snake Charmer" | 2011 | — | — | — | — | — | — | — | 24 | — | — | Neighborhoods |
| "Fighting the Gravity" | 2011 | — | — | — | — | — | — | — | 29 | — | — | Neighborhoods |
| "Even If She Falls" | 2011 | — | — | — | — | — | — | — | 9 | — | — | Neighborhoods |
| "Dogs Eating Dogs" | 2012 | — | — | — | — | 55 | — | — | — | — | — | Dogs Eating Dogs |
| "Cynical" | 2016 | — | — | 20 | — | — | — | 30 | 5 | — | — | California |
| "Los Angeles" | 2016 | — | — | 31 | — | — | — | 42 | 8 | — | — | California |
| "Sober" | 2016 | — | — | 25 | — | — | — | 37 | 6 | — | — | California |
| "Kings of the Weekend" | 2016 | — | — | 36 | — | — | — | — | 16 | — | — | California |
| "Teenage Satellites" | 2016 | — | — | 42 | — | — | — | — | 21 | — | — | California |
| "Left Alone" | 2016 | — | — | 33 | — | — | — | — | 20 | — | — | California |
| "San Diego" | 2016 | — | — | 35 | — | — | — | — | 22 | — | — | California |
| "The Only Thing That Matters" | 2016 | — | — | 45 | — | — | — | — | 30 | — | — | California |
| "California" | 2016 | — | — | 37 | — | — | — | — | 24 | — | — | California |
| "The First Time" | 2019 | — | — | 15 | — | — | 40 | — | 14 | — | — | Nine |
| "Heaven" | 2019 | — | — | 26 | — | — | — | — | 20 | — | — | Nine |
| "Run Away" | 2019 | — | — | 33 | — | — | — | — | — | — | — | Nine |
| "Black Rain" | 2019 | — | — | 28 | — | — | — | — | 29 | — | — | Nine |
| "Pin the Grenade" | 2019 | — | — | 13 | — | — | 35 | — | 18 | — | — | Nine |
| "No Heart to Speak Of" | 2019 | — | — | 29 | — | — | — | — | 27 | — | — | Nine |
| "Ransom" | 2019 | — | — | 42 | — | — | — | — | — | — | — | Nine |
| "On Some Emo Shit" | 2019 | — | — | 36 | — | — | — | — | 36 | — | — | Nine |
| "Hungover You" | 2019 | — | — | 37 | — | — | — | — | — | — | — | Nine |
| "Remember to Forget Me" | 2019 | — | — | 40 | — | — | — | — | — | — | — | Nine |
| "Anthem Part 3" | 2023 | 12 | — | 22 | 78 | — | 9 | — | 4 | 48 | — | One More Time... |
| "Terrified" | 2023 | — | — | 38 | — | — | 30 | — | — | — | — | One More Time... |
| "When We Were Young" | 2023 | — | — | 48 | — | — | 34 | — | 17 | — | — | One More Time... |
| "Blink Wave" | 2023 | — | — | 50 | — | — | 38 | — | — | — | — | One More Time... |
| "Bad News" | 2023 | — | — | — | — | — | — | — | 28 | — | — | One More Time... |
| "Turpentine" | 2023 | — | — | — | — | — | — | — | 27 | — | — | One More Time... |
| "Other Side" | 2023 | — | — | — | — | — | — | — | 39 | — | — | One More Time... |
| "Cut Me Off" | 2023 | — | 10 | — | — | — | — | — | — | — (Note: "Cut Me Off" did not enter the UK Singles Chart, but peaked at number 98 on the UK Singles Sales Chart.) | — (Note: "Cut Me Off" did not enter the UK Singles Chart, but peaked at number 89 on the UK Singles Downloads Chart.) | One More Time... |
| "See You" | 2023 | — | 8 | — (Note: "See You" did not enter the Rock Songs chart, but peaked at number 14 on the Rock Digital Songs chart.) | — | — | — | — | — | — (Note: "See You" did not enter the UK Singles Chart, but peaked at number 88 on the UK Singles Sales Chart.) | — (Note: "See You" did not enter the UK Singles Chart, but peaked at number 80 on the UK Singles Downloads Chart.) | One More Time... |
| "Can't Go Back" | 2024 | — | 8 | — (Note: "Can't Go Back" did not enter the Rock Songs chart, but peaked at number 10 on the Rock Digital Songs chart.) | — | — | — | — | — | — (Note: "Can't Go Back" did not enter the UK Singles Chart, but peaked at number 68 on the UK Singles Sales Chart.) | — (Note: "Can't Go Back" did not enter the UK Singles Chart, but peaked at number 67 on the UK Singles Downloads Chart.) | One More Time... Part 2 |
| "One Night Stand" | 2024 | — | 10 | — (Note: "One Night Stand" did not enter the Rock Songs chart, but peaked at number 12 on the Rock Digital Songs chart.) | — | — | — | — | — | — (Note: "One Night Stand" did not enter the UK Singles Chart, but peaked at number 81 on the UK Singles Sales Chart.) | — (Note: "One Night Stand" did not enter the UK Singles Chart, but peaked at number 79 on the UK Singles Downloads Chart.) | One More Time... Part 2 |
| "Everyone Everywhere" | 2024 | — | — | — (Note: "Everyone Everywhere" did not enter the Rock Songs chart, but peaked at number 14 on the Rock Digital Songs chart.) | — | — | — | — | — | — (Note: "Everyone Everywhere" did not enter the UK Singles Chart, but peaked at number 84 on the UK Singles Sales Chart.) | — (Note: "Everyone Everywhere" did not enter the UK Singles Chart, but peaked at number 82 on the UK Singles Downloads Chart.) | One More Time... Part 2 |
| "Every Other Weekend" | 2024 | — | 9 | — (Note: "Every Other Weekend" did not enter the Rock Songs chart, but peaked at number 11 on the Rock Digital Songs chart.) | — | — | — | — | — | — (Note: "Every Other Weekend" did not enter the UK Singles Chart, but peaked at number 73 on the UK Singles Sales Chart.) | — (Note: "Every Other Weekend" did not enter the UK Singles Chart, but peaked at number 72 on the UK Singles Downloads Chart.) | One More Time... Part 2 |
| "If You Never Left" | 2024 | — | 5 | — (Note: "If You Never Left" did not enter the Rock Songs chart, but peaked at number 7 on the Rock Digital Songs chart.) | — | — | — | — | — | — (Note: "If You Never Left" did not enter the UK Singles Chart, but peaked at number 74 on the UK Singles Sales Chart.) | — (Note: "If You Never Left" did not enter the UK Singles Chart, but peaked at number 73 on the UK Singles Downloads Chart.) | One More Time... Part 2 |
"—" denotes a recording that did not chart or was not released in that territory.

== Guest appearances ==
List of guest appearances, showing year released and album name
| Title | Year | Album |
|---|---|---|
| "Dancing with Myself" | 1997 | Before You Were Punk: A Punk Rock Tribute to 80's New Wave |
| "Dead Man's Curve" | 1999 | Shake, Rattle and Roll: An American Love Story |
| "Family Reunion" | 1999 | Short Music for Short People |
| "It's All Fading to Black" (XXXTentacion featuring Blink-182) | 2019 | Bad Vibes Forever |
| "Death Bed" (Bonus Remix) (Powfu featuring Beabadoobee and Blink-182) | 2020 | Poems of the Past |

== Videography ==
=== Video albums ===
List of video albums, with selected chart positions, sales figures and certifications
| Title | Album details | Peak chart positions | | Certifications |
| Title | Album details | US Vid. | AUS DVD | Certifications |
|---|---|---|---|---|
| The Urethra Chronicles | Released: November 30, 1999; Label: MCA; Formats: DVD, VHS | 8 | 1 | RIAA: Platinum; MC: Gold |
| The Urethra Chronicles II: Harder, Faster Faster, Harder | Released: May 7, 2002; Label: MCA; Formats: DVD | 1 | 9 | |
| Greatest Hits | Released: November 1, 2005; Label: Geffen; Formats: DVD, UMD | — | 7 | ARIA: Platinum |
"—" denotes a recording that did not chart or was not released in that territory.

=== Music videos ===
List of music videos, showing year released and directors
| Title | Year | Director(s) |
|---|---|---|
| "M+M's" | 1995 | Darren Doane and Ken Daurio |
| "Dammit" | 1997 | Darren Doane and Ken Daurio |
| "Josie" | 1998 | Darren Doane and Ken Daurio |
| "What's My Age Again?" | 1999 | Marcos Siega |
| "All the Small Things" | 1999 | Marcos Siega |
| "Adam's Song" | 2000 | Liz Friedlander |
| "Man Overboard" | 2000 | Marcos Siega |
| "The Rock Show" | 2001 | The Malloys |
| "Anthem Part Two" (live) | 2001 | Virgil P. Thompson |
| "First Date" | 2001 | The Malloys |
| "Stay Together for the Kids" | 2001 | Samuel Bayer |
| "Feeling This" | 2003 | David LaChapelle |
| "I Miss You" | 2004 | Jonas Åkerlund |
| "Down" | 2004 | Estevan Oriol |
| "Always" | 2004 | Joseph Kahn |
| "Not Now" | 2005 | Estevan Oriol |
| "Up All Night" | 2011 | Isaac Rentz |
| "Heart's All Gone" | 2011 | Jason Bergh |
| "Wishing Well" | 2011 | Haven Lamoureux |
| "After Midnight" | 2011 | Isaac Rentz |
| "Bored to Death" | 2016 | Rob Soucy |
| "She's Out of Her Mind" | 2016 | Nicholas Lam and Jason Koenig |
| "Home Is Such a Lonely Place" (Note: The music video for "Home Is Such a Lonely Place" was released in four versions: three iterations filmed at each band member's home, and a main version with those clips interspersed.) | 2017 | Jason Goldwatch |
| "Why Are We So Broken" (Steve Aoki featuring Blink-182) | 2019 | Brandon Dermer |
| "Generational Divide" | 2019 | Kevin Kerslake |
| "Darkside" | 2019 | Andrew Sandler |
| "Scumbag" (Goody Grace featuring Blink-182) | 2019 | Kyle Cogan and Kyle Dunleavy |
| "Not Another Christmas Song" | 2019 | Johnny McHone |
| "Happy Days" | 2020 | Andrew Sandler |
| "Quarantine" | 2020 | Unknown |
| "Edging" | 2022 | Cole Bennett |
| "One More Time" | 2023 | Carlos Lopez Estrada |
| "Dance with Me" | 2023 | The Malloys |
| "Anthem Part 3" | 2023 | Unknown |

== See also ==
- List of songs recorded by Blink-182
