= What's My Age Again? =

1999 single by Blink-182

Single by Blink-182

from the album Enema of the State
- Released: April 1999
- Recorded: January–March 1999
- Genre: Pop-punk; alternative rock
- Length: 2:26
- Label: MCA
- Songwriters: Mark Hoppus; Tom DeLonge
- Producer: Jerry Finn

Blink-182 singles chronology
"Josie" (1998)	"What's My Age Again?" (1999)	"All the Small Things" (1999)

Music video
- "What's My Age Again?" on YouTube

"What's My Age Again?" is a song by American rock band Blink-182. It was released in April 1999 as the lead single from the group's third studio album, Enema of the State (1999), released through MCA Records. "What's My Age Again?" shares writing credits between the band's guitarist Tom DeLonge and bassist Mark Hoppus, but Hoppus was the primary composer of the song. It was the band's first single to feature drummer Travis Barker. A mid-tempo pop-punk song, "What's My Age Again?" is memorable for its distinctive, arpeggiated guitar intro.

Lyrically, the song is about immaturity. Hoppus declined to label the song as autobiographical, but admitted that he spent his twenties acting immature. The trio recorded the song with producer Jerry Finn. It was originally titled "Peter Pan Complex", an allusion to the pop-psychology concept, but label MCA found the reference obscure and adjusted the title. The song's signature music video famously features the band running nude on the streets of Los Angeles. It received heavy rotation on MTV and other music video channels.

It became one of the band's best-performing singles, peaking at number two on the U.S. Billboard Modern Rock Tracks chart for 10 weeks. The song placed at number three in Italy and number 17 in the United Kingdom. Primarily an airplay hit, the song was the band's first to cross over to pop radio, hitting number 58 on the Billboard Hot 100. The song received positive reviews and has been called a classic pop punk track; NME placed it at number 117 on its list "150 Best Tracks of the Past 15 Years" in 2012.

== Background and writing ==
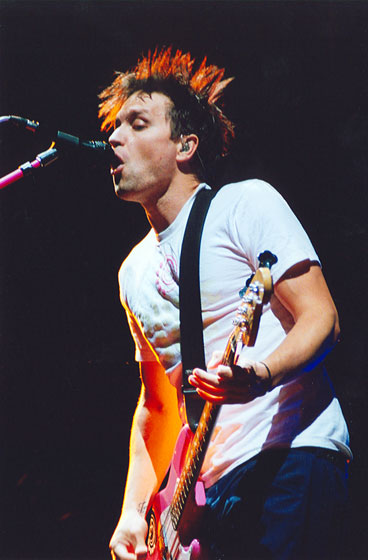
Bassist and vocalist Mark Hoppus initially composed the song as a joke.

Blink-182, consisting of bassist Mark Hoppus, guitarist Tom DeLonge, and drummer Scott Raynor, formed in the early 1990s, and by the end of the decade, had reached commercial success with their second album, 1997's Dude Ranch. Its lead single, "Dammit", became one of the most-played U.S. modern rock hits of 1998, sending its parent album to a gold certification and bringing the members newfound notoriety and wealth. With his first advance from major-label MCA, Hoppus purchased a home in the band's hometown of San Diego, California. Hoppus developed "What's My Age Again?" while sitting on the floor and playing guitar in his kitchen/living room. He was attempting to play the song "J.A.R." by Green Day, which has a distinctive intro on bass guitar. While practicing playing the riff, Hoppus came up with a new song derived from his failure to perform the part correctly.

Though he initially developed it as a vulgar joke song, he felt it had potential as a regular tune. Hoppus claims it took him five minutes to write. He later presented the song to the band while rehearsing at DML Studios in Escondido, California, where they had booked time for two weeks to write new songs. Earlier that year, Raynor had been expelled from the group and replaced with percussionist Travis Barker, previously of the ska-punk act the Aquabats. He and DeLonge found the composition agreeable and further developed it in the rehearsal space. The story in the song is not strictly autobiographical, but its central theme resonated with Hoppus, who spent his twenties by his own admission "acting like a jackass teenager". Barker agreed, later commenting: "[Mark] was a grown man but kept acting like a kid." Many Blink songs center on maturity—"more specifically, their lack of it, their attitude toward their lack of it, or their eventual wide-eyed exploration of it" according to writer Nitsuh Abebe.

== Composition ==
"What's My Age Again?"
The arpeggiated guitar riff gives way to power chords in the song's chorus.

"What's My Age Again?" is credited to Tom DeLonge and Mark Hoppus. Though Barker helped write the songs on Enema of the State, only Hoppus and DeLonge received songwriting credits, as Barker was technically a hired musician, not an official band member. The song is two minutes and twenty-eight seconds long. The song is composed in the key of G-flat major and is set in time signature of common time with a driving tempo of 158 beats per minute. Hoppus' vocal range spans from Db_{3} to Gb_{4}. It follows a I–V–vi–IV chord progression, common across several genres of music. The band utilize the progression in numerous other singles; music educator and author Dan Bennett claims the progression is sometimes called the "pop-punk progression" because of its frequent use in the genre. The song is incredibly brief compared to most singles; within one minute, nearly two full verses and a chorus have been completed, and it in total runs two minutes and twenty-six seconds.

=== Instrumentation ===
The song opens with an arpeggiated guitar hook, following the song's chord progression in playing the root notes of each chord. The part has been considered tricky to perform; given its quick, articulated nature, it can be difficult to skip over the strings properly. Hoppus's bass line, which has been compared to the Pixies' song "Debaser", also situates on the roots of each chord. The song combines Hoppus' melodic vocal with harmonized backing vocals by DeLonge, while Barker's drumming incorporates syncopated kick patterns and intricate fills. Barker based the song's drum rhythm on "Boxcar" by Jawbreaker. Double-tracked guitar parts contribute to the song's dense, polished sound. The song utilizes power chords in its chorus, and substitutes the arpeggiated intro for palm-muted power chords in the succeeding verse.

=== Lyrics ===
The lyrics follow an immature young man whose inability to behave like an adult repeatedly sabotages his relationships. In the opening verse, the narrator prepares for a date by putting on cologne in hopes of impressing his girlfriend, but loses her interest after choosing to watch television during a romantic encounter. The chorus concludes that "nobody likes you when you're 23"—a lyric Hoppus wrote at age 26 simply because the number rhymed. Although the protagonist briefly questions his own behavior ("What the hell is wrong with me?"), he ultimately embraces his immaturity, dismissing the pressure to "act my age" in favor of taking his time growing up.

The second verse continues the narrator's juvenile behavior as he prank-calls his ex-girlfriend's mother from a payphone, falsely claiming that her husband has been arrested for sodomy, before joking, "What the hell is call ID?" Hoppus intentionally wrote each chorus with different lyrics to advance the story rather than repeating the same refrain. He later explained that he wanted the familiar hook to evolve with each repetition, reflecting an artistic philosophy that "the best art is the evolution of familiarity": introducing an idea, allowing the audience to connect with it, and then subtly altering it to keep it engaging.

== Recording and production ==
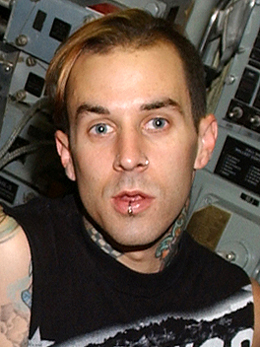
"What's My Age Again?" was the trio's first single with drummer Travis Barker.

After further development, the group presented it to producer Jerry Finn. A veteran engineer, Finn came to fame mixing Green Day's breakthrough album Dookie (1994). Finn was suggested by major label MCA as an option for producing Enema of the State; the band got along with him immediately, and continued to work with him on their future projects. Finn would suggest and make adjustments where necessary, though in the case of "What's My Age Again?", he had little notes. By the time Hoppus presented the song to his bandmates, the first verse and chorus were written, with its second verse and bridge section needing further work. Hoppus and DeLonge crafted an instrumental bridge that went on for eight measures, which all agreed felt too long. Finn assisted in shortening the section, and the group recorded a demo at DML Studios.

Within the new year, the group recorded the song proper. The drums on Enema of the State were tracked at Mad Hatter Studios in North Hollywood, a space once owned by jazz musician Chick Corea. Hoppus remembered that Finn was meticulous in recording the kit, spending hours on microphone placement, as well as picking compressors and at which rate they would run. Barker recorded his drum portions, as well as the rest of the album's twelve songs, in eight hours. From there, Hoppus and DeLonge recorded their bass and guitar tracks at multiple studios throughout Los Angeles and San Diego. The band brought in session musician Roger Joseph Manning Jr.—best known for his career in the band Jellyfish and work with Beck—to add keyboard parts in the background of the song.

The song originally concluded after its final chorus. While recording, Hoppus liked how the arpeggiated chord progression continued over the rhythm guitar line in the last chorus, and wished to extend its length to highlight this element. In the pre-digital recording environment, this required the team to "bounce" the mix from the analog tape recorder (a 24 track 2-inch tape) to another tape, and splice the recordings together. With recording complete, the song was sent to engineer Tom Lord-Alge, who mixed the song at his South Beach Studios facility in Miami Beach, Florida. Lord-Alge had previously remixed the Dude Ranch singles "Dammit" and "Josie" for radio, and would work with the group frequently in the future. Lord-Alge added subtle touches, including a panning effect for the title phrase in the last chorus.

== Release ==
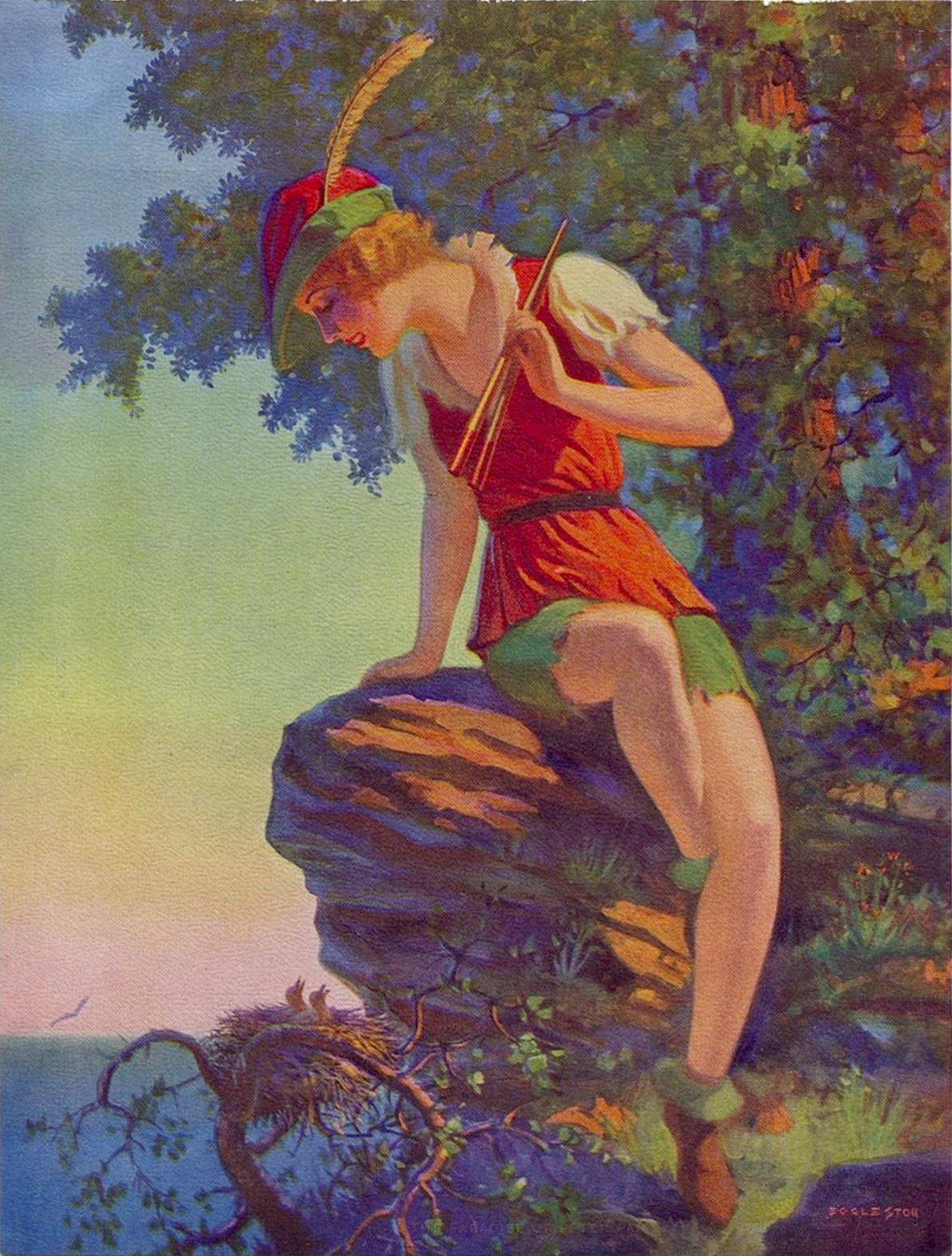
The song's title originally referenced fictional children's character Peter Pan.

Although Blink-182 retained creative control over Enema of the State, MCA Records insisted on approving the album's lead single, believing the choice would be pivotal to its parent album's long-term commercial prospects. Band manager Rick DeVoe and label executives viewed "What's My Age Again?" as the album's strongest commercial prospect, and MCA president Jay Boberg ultimately selected it as the lead single. DeLonge, however, was initially unconvinced by the decision, later recalling, "I didn't understand it, because up to that point, we hadn't had a big single."

The working title for the song was "Peter Pan Complex", referencing the popular psychology concept of an adult who is socially immature. Executives at MCA Records were uncertain that listeners would connect with the title, given it goes unmentioned in the song's lyrics. Previously, the label had appended parentheses to its two stateside singles from Dude Ranch: "Dammit (Growing Up)" and "Josie (Everything's Gonna Be Fine)". The label was also concerned about litigation from the Walt Disney Company, who held rights to the name following their film adaption. The band disliked the suggestion, but given the creative freedom MCA had afforded them throughout recording, agreed to the change. Hoppus later conceded the new title made more sense and "feels right".

== Commercial performance ==
Commercially, "What's My Age Again?" became one of the band's best-performing singles. It was picked as the lead single from Enema of the State. It was first serviced to radio in April 1999, and premiered on KROQ-FM, an influential Los Angeles alternative station. Hoppus remembered the group were finalizing mixing the album when the song debuted. The song did best on Billboard's Modern Rock Tracks chart; the song first entered the chart during the week of May 8, where it debuted at number 21. It entered the top five during the week of June 5, and reached number two on July 24, where it remained for ten weeks behind the Red Hot Chili Peppers' "Scar Tissue". The song crossed over to mainstream domestic radio in mid-1999, where it debuted at number 71 on the Billboard Hot 100 on July 17. It later peaked at number 58 in the issue dated October 23. The song had previously peaked at number 51 on the Hot 100 Airplay chart on September 11.

It was also one of the year's most successful alternative radio singles, finishing 1999 at number four on Billboard's year-end Modern Rock Tracks chart, while also placing on the year-end Mainstream Rock Tracks and Mainstream Top 40 rankings. Abroad, "What's My Age Again?" became blink-182's first major international hit, marking the band's commercial breakthrough beyond North America. Internationally, the song charted across Europe and Oceania, reaching the top five in Italy, number 12 in Scotland, number 34 in Ireland, and the top 50 in Australia, Iceland, New Zealand, and Sweden. In the United Kingdom, the song was released twice, first on September 20, 1999, and again on June 26, 2000, following the success of "All the Small Things. The 2000 re-release peaked at number 17 on the UK Singles Chart, while also reaching the top spot on the Rock & Metal Singles Chart. It also entered the national charts in France, Germany, the Netherlands, and Switzerland, and also made the Eurochart Hot 100, a Billboard aggregate of charts across European markets. Its widespread chart success established blink-182 as an international mainstream act and laid the foundation for the global commercial success of Enema of the State.

== Critical reception ==
The truth is that it was always a little strange for grown men to be writing songs about prom night and other high-school pitfalls, but "What's My Age Again?" works so well because it tackles that strangeness head-on. Aside from featuring Blink's most recognizable riff this side of "Dammit", the song is an honest, relatable assessment of what it feels like to be dragged kicking and screaming into adulthood. It's rock and roll as escape, yes, but also as a kind of backpedaling. Let the rock bands of the '70s champion sex and drugs; these guys just want to remember what it feels like to be kids again.

— Collin Brennan, Consequence of Sound

The song received generally positive reviews upon release. Carrie Bell at Billboard deemed the song a "peppy punk anthem" while Spin columnist Jeffery Rotter called it an "ideal tonic for back-to-school nausea." A Kerrang! writer called the song "ridiculously infectious," while the New Musical Express (NME) derided the song as "more mindless, punk-pop guitar thrashing from the world's current favorite American brats ... on the plus side, the song — much like Blink-182's career, we hope — only lasts for two-and-a-half minutes." Stephen Thompson, writing for The A.V. Club, complimented its catchy sensibility, remarking, "you'll never go broke creating an anthem for immature post-adolescents, even working within a well-worn genre."

Later reviews have subsequently been positive. Jon Blisten of Beats Per Minute deemed it one of the record's "finest songs," calling it a "twisted, self-depreciating examination of man-children." In 2014, Chris Payne of Billboard called it "the quintessential Blink manifesto — the story of a twenty-something who still acts like a child." The website Consequence of Sound, in a 2015 top 10 of the band's best songs, ranked it as number six, with writer Collin Brennan observing that its title is "the question underpinning the entire Blink ethos". Jeremy Gordon of Pitchfork agreed, observing that "What's My Age Again?" "summed up blink's entire emotional purview," citing its themes of "sexual failure, exes, and developmentally arrested existential despair."

Steve Appleford of the Los Angeles Times described "What's My Age Again?" as one of blink-182's signature songs, praising its blend of adolescent humor and "irresistible hooks." Writing for The New Yorker, Amanda Petrusich described "What's My Age Again?" as "a frantic anthem for anyone unwilling to go gracefully into adulthood," arguing that the song had retained that cultural role decades after its release. In a retrospective review for Tidal, Dale Eisinger called "What's My Age Again?" "nearly perfect," writing that its "introspection remarks distinctly on this period for the band" and arguing that it showcased the band's songwriting, musicianship, and melodic strengths.

== Music video ==
=== Filming ===
The opening shot depicts the band running nude down 3rd Street in Los Angeles.

The music video for "What's My Age Again?", directed by Marcos Siega, features the band running in the nude through the streets of Los Angeles, as well as through commercials and daily news programs. It was filmed shortly after completing the album, and was co-directed by Brandon PeQueen. Siega had known the band for many years at that point, having seen them play small clubs years before. It was the first of three videos Siega helmed for the trio; he later returned for 1999's "All the Small Things" and "Man Overboard", from 2000.

Siega became involved after meeting Craig DeLeon, then a video commissioner for MCA, at an art installation. Siega had a history in punk and hardcore videos, including clips for bands like Quicksand, and developed the song's treatment, alongside PeQueen. They took inspiration from the band's previously-established sense of humor, and onstage antics, in addition to their proclivity for nudity: when performing live, Barker would often strip down to his boxers due to heat, while Hoppus would sometimes disrobe entirely, with only his bass guitar covering his genitals. Siega partially credited the idea to a late-night talk show segment about a streaker. Hoppus and DeLonge were immediately receptive to the idea; Barker less so. "My brain kept going to the sort of anti-establishment punk rock ethic that I associated them with. But not in an aggro way. They always came across to me as doing it with a wink," Siega later recalled.

The group wore flesh-colored Speedos for most scenes. The clip features cameo appearances by porn star Janine Lindemulder, the model featured on the cover of Enema of the State, and television personalities John Henson and Jim Rome as well as anchors from Los Angeles station KTLA as the band ran through the sets of their respective shows (Talk Soup, The Last Word with Jim Rome, and KTLA 5 News). Barker remembered that motorists "kept staring at us and honking their horns," and that the entire filming took nearly fifteen hours. "They almost got into accidents," Hoppus told Rolling Stone.

=== Popularity ===
The video first began receiving airplay in early May 1999, debuting on U.S. television channels MTV, MTV2 and The Box. The video was MTV's second-most played video for the week ending August 1, and remained a popular video on the channel for over two years. The video was nominated for Best Alternative Video at the 2000 MVPA Awards, but lost to Foo Fighters' "Learn to Fly". The band referenced the clip at the 1999 Billboard Music Awards, which opened with a clip of the band streaking through Las Vegas, as well as through appearances on Total Request Live and the scripted sitcom Two Guys, a Girl and a Pizza Place. Entertainment Weekly writer Chris Willman called the video "ubiquitous".

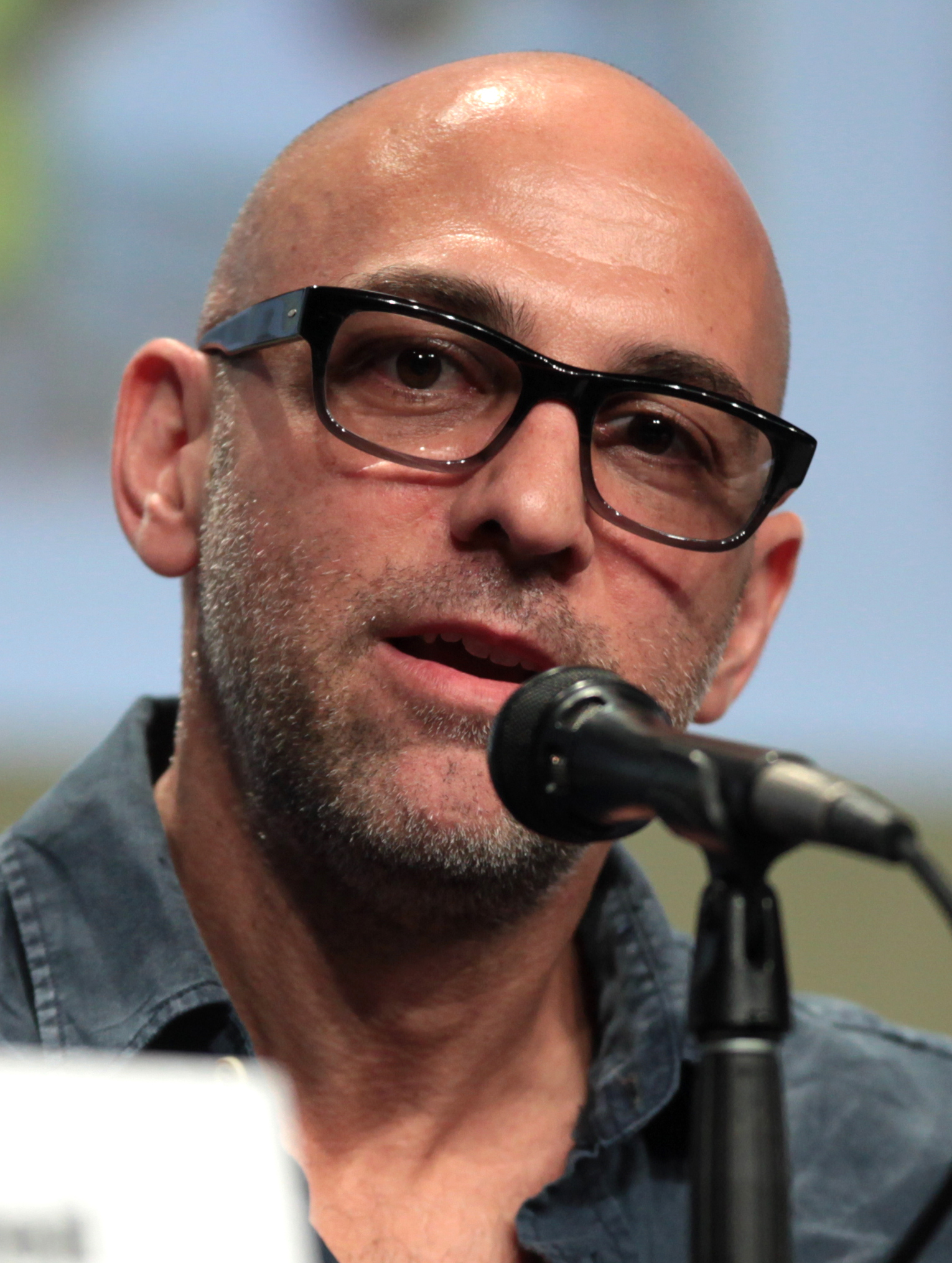
Marcos Siega, the video's director, in 2014.

The video gave the band a reputation for nudity, leading many critics to pigeonhole them as a joke act. "It became something of an albatross as band members grew up," wrote Richard Harrington of The Washington Post. "You know, when we were filming the video for "What's My Age Again?" the whole naked thing was only funny for like 10 minutes. Then, I was the guy standing naked on the side of the street Los Angeles with cars driving by me giving me the finger and shit. It's funny watching the video now, but at the time, it stopped being funny ten minutes in, and it definitely wasn't funny three days into it," recalled Tom DeLonge.

This reputation would lead the band members to take control of their marketing and image, as DeLonge later commented in 2014:

We were so naïve that we would run around naked, but they’d make it all glossy and put it on posters and make it look like we really were some kind of erotic boy band or some shit. We were coming from the punk scene, but the label fashioned a whole thing around us that we didn’t even understand; we were just kinda caught up in it. So it took us a little bit to dig out of that and come back to who we really were. And it’s hard to do that once people spend millions of dollars making you into something visually that we weren’t.

== Legacy ==
"What's My Age Again?" has endured as among the band's most popular songs, and has widely been considered a watershed moment for pop punk as a genre. Several of the group's contemporaries ranked the song among the genre's most influential, including Jack Barakat of All Time Low, Pierre Bouvier and Chuck Comeau from Simple Plan, and Tyson Ritter of the All-American Rejects. Rolling Stone's Nicole Frehsée wrote that, "For a new generation of emo fans and bands, Blink's irreverent, upbeat take on punk rock with hits like "What's My Age Again?" and "All the Small Things" was hugely influential." Twenty years after the song's release, Hoppus noted that fans often decorate birthday cakes on their 23rd birthday with the lyric "Nobody likes you when you're 23", which he felt was an honor. The band later paid homage to the song's infamous video in the music video for their 2016 single "She's Out of Her Mind". The clip sees modern-day social media personalities running in the nude in Los Angeles. Lindemulder's place in the video was taken by actor and comedian Adam DeVine.

The Hollywood Reporter's Mischa Pearlman, in a review a 2013 concert by the group, wrote that the song "visibly infects every member of the audience. Because it's a song that recalls the reckless abandon of youth, and the carelessness of growing up." Although the magazine gave the song a scathing review upon its initial release, NME placed it at number 117 on its list "150 Best Tracks of the Past 15 Years" nearly thirteen years later, writing, "Few songs capture the urge of wanting to act stupid and be immature as well as this 2000 single does. [...] This is everything pop punk does well. Its guitar riffs seem to have been soaked in Relentless and its chorus makes you want to jump around the room. It's been imitated thousands of times since, but nothing's come close to this..."

By the late 2000s, club promoters in the U.K. created nights based around lasting appreciation of the pop punk genre, including one named after "What's My Age Again?", described as a night celebrating "pop-punk, youthful abandon and teenage riot". British radio station BBC Radio 1 have a section on one of their shows named after the single and using it as the theme song. Greg James originated the game on his drivetime show, and has moved it to The BBC Radio 1 Breakfast Show. The game sees Greg pitted against an opponent, typically a fellow Radio 1 DJ/presenter or celebrity guest. In the game, three listeners phone in and talk to the competitors, who take it in turns to ask questions, then try to guess the listeners' age.

On March 26, 2019, the song was lauded by Princeton professor of music Steven Mackey during an interview between Hoppus and Mackey given at Princeton University. Mackey praised the lyrics by saying, "it's very much this portrait of this kind of 23 year old... Peter Pan complex", noting his enjoyment of the structure of the song, as well as its tone. Mackey stated, "after the second chorus there's this instrumental break. And there's a lot of instrumental breaks in Blink, which I really like. This one in particular, it goes to a minor key. All of a sudden, it's kind of melancholy. And when they come out of that instrumental break, and I hear the rest of the words, it's sort of like... I feel like, wow, was that a moment of reflection? And then it's like, 'Ah, fuck it. Whatever.' It has that feeling. It sort of deepens it for me."

In 2023, the song was used in the trailer for the reboot of Clone High.

In 2024, the song was later included in Fortnite in Fortnite Festival as a jam track.

== Mashup ==
"What's My Age Again? / A Milli"

Single by Blink-182 and Lil Wayne
- Released: August 23, 2019
- Genre: Pop punk; rap rock
- Length: 2:25
- Label: Columbia
- Songwriters: Mark Hoppus; Travis Barker; Tom DeLonge; Dwayne Carter; Ali Shaheed Muhammad; Kamaal Ibn John Fareed; Shondrae Crawford

Blink-182 singles chronology
"Darkside" (2019)	"What's My Age Again? / A Milli" (2019)	"I Really Wish I Hated You" (2019)

Lil Wayne singles chronology
"Be Like Me" (2019)	"What's My Age Again? / A Milli" (2019)

Music video
- "What's My Age Again? / A Milli" on YouTube

In May 2019, the band recorded a live mashup of the song with hip hop artist Lil Wayne, to promote their joint headlining tour. The track combines "What's My Age Again? and Wayne's 2008 single "A Milli". The duo later released a joint digital single featuring a studio version of the mashup in August of that year. The track features Matt Skiba, who replaced founding guitarist Tom DeLonge in 2015, performing backing vocals and guitar. A press release promoted the new version, which was released to promote the second leg of the aforementioned tour, as a "new take on the track."

The Fader contributor Jordan Darville noted that Wayne altered a lyric from his original verse, substituting the term "crackers" for "bitches".

== Credits and personnel ==
=== Original version ===
Credits adapted from the liner notes of Enema of the State.
Locations

- Recorded at Signature Sound, Studio West, San Diego California; Mad Hatter Studios, The Bomb Factory, Los Angeles, California; Conway Recording Studios, Hollywood, California; Big Fish Studios, Encinitas, California
- Mixed at Conway Recording Studios, Hollywood, California; South Beach Studios, Miami, Florida

Personnel

Blink-182

- Mark Hoppus – bass guitar, lead vocals, songwriting
- Tom DeLonge – guitars, backing vocals, songwriting
- Travis Barker – drums

Additional musicians

- Roger Joseph Manning Jr. – keyboards

Production

- Jerry Finn – production
- Tom Lord-Alge – mixing engineer
- Sean O'Dwyer – recording engineer
- Darrel Harvey – assistant engineer
- John Nelson – assistant engineer
- Robert Read – assistant engineer
- Mike Fasano – drum technician
- Rick DeVoe – management
- Gary Ashley – A&R
- Brian Gardner – mastering engineer

=== Mashup version ===
Credits adapted from the YouTube video for "What's My Age Again?" / "A Milli". Barker is credited with songwriting on this edition, as opposed to his original credits for Enema of the State.
Personnel

Blink-182

- Mark Hoppus – bass guitar, lead vocals, songwriting
- Matt Skiba – guitars, backing vocals
- Travis Barker – drums, songwriting

Additional musicians

- Shondrae Crawford – songwriting
- Tom DeLonge – songwriting
- Kamaal Ibn John Fareed – songwriting
- Ali Shaheed Muhammad – songwriting
- Lil Wayne – rap vocals, songwriting

Production

- Matt Malpass – engineer
- Rich Costey – mixing engineer
- Chris Athens – mastering engineer

== Charts ==
=== Weekly charts ===
Chart (1999–2000)	Peak position
Australia (ARIA)	42
Canada Top Singles (RPM)	42
Canada Rock/Alternative (RPM)	18
Europe (Eurochart Hot 100)	52
France (SNEP)	93
Germany (GfK)	80
Iceland (Íslenski Listinn Topp 40)	36
Ireland (IRMA)	34
Italy (FIMI)	4
Netherlands (Dutch Top 40 Tipparade)	9
Netherlands (Single Top 100)	90
New Zealand (Recorded Music NZ)	43
Scottish Singles Sales (Official Charts)	12
Sweden (Sverigetopplistan)	44
Switzerland (Schweizer Hitparade)	52
UK Singles (Official Charts)	17
UK Rock & Metal (Official Charts)	1
US Billboard Hot 100	58
US Adult Pop Airplay (Billboard)	36
US Alternative Airplay (Billboard)	2
US Pop Airplay (Billboard)	28

=== Year-end charts ===
Chart (1999)	Position
US Mainstream Rock Tracks (Billboard)	49
US Mainstream Top 40 (Billboard)	85
US Modern Rock Tracks (Billboard)	4

== Certifications ==
Region	Certification	Certified units/sales
Germany (BVMI)	Gold	250,000^{‡}
Italy (FIMI)	Platinum	50,000^{‡}
New Zealand (RMNZ)	3× Platinum	90,000^{‡}
Spain (Promusicae)	Gold	30,000^{‡}
United Kingdom (BPI)	2× Platinum	1,200,000^{‡}
^{‡} Sales+streaming figures based on certification alone.
