= Short Bus =

A short bus refers to a smaller school bus typically used to transport disabled students apart from the other students. The term may also refer to:

- Shortbus, an American film
- Short Bus (album), by American band Filter
- Short Bus (EP), by Blink-182 and The Iconoclasts
- Long Beach Shortbus, an American reggae band
