= Blink-182 and Lil Wayne Tour =

2019 concert tour

- Continental tour by Blink-182 and Lil Wayne
- Location: North America
- Associated album: Nine; Enema of the State; Tha Carter V
- Start date: June 29, 2019
- End date: September 20, 2019
- Legs: 1
- No. of shows: 41
Blink-182 tour chronology
Kings of the Weekend Tour (2018)	Blink-182 and Lil Wayne Tour (2019)	World Tour 2023/2024 (2023–24)
Lil Wayne tour chronology
I Ain't Shit Without You (2018)	Blink-182 and Lil Wayne Tour (2019)	Welcome To Tha Carter Tour (2023)

The Blink-182 and Lil Wayne Tour was a co-headlining concert tour by American rock band Blink-182 and American rapper Lil Wayne. The tour was in support of the group's eighth studio album, Nine, as well as Wayne's previously released twelfth studio album, Tha Carter V (2018). The tour began on June 29 in Hartford, Connecticut and concluded on September 16, 2019, in Cincinnati, Ohio. One date coincided with Blink-182's appearance on the Vans Warped Tour 25th anniversary reunion show, as well as at 2019's Riot Fest. Welsh punk group Neck Deep was the opening act on the tour. It was the band's last tour with guitarist/vocalist Matt Skiba before his departure in 2022 upon original member Tom DeLonge's return.

To promote and announce the tour, Blink-182 and Lil Wayne released live and studio mashups of their songs "What's My Age Again?" and "A Milli". One month after first publicizing the tour, Blink-182 also announced they would perform their 1999 album Enema of the State in full at all shows, in addition to their hit singles and new music.

== Reception ==
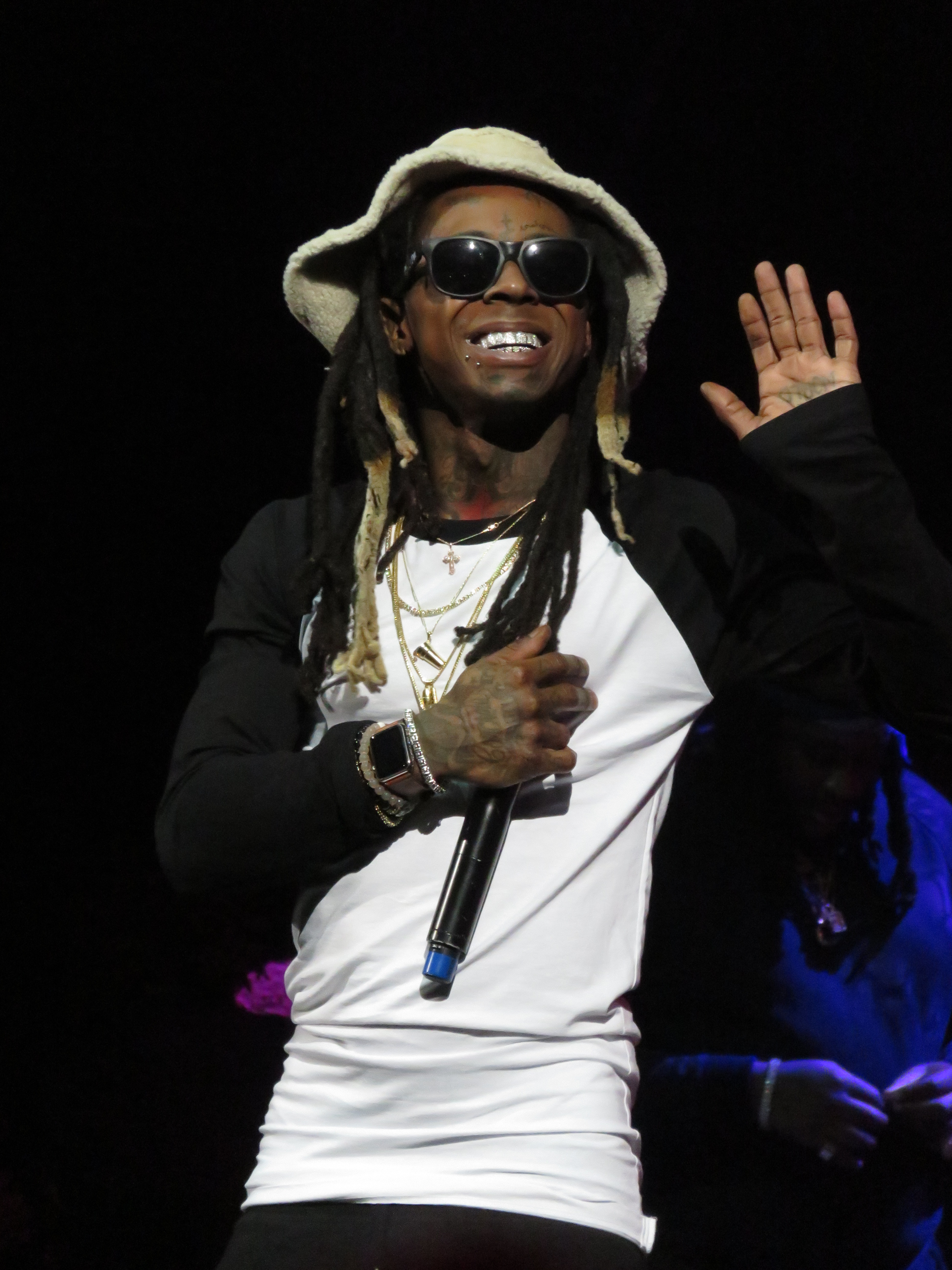
Lil Wayne canceled several shows on the tour, reportedly unhappy with low attendance.

Ticket sales to the tour were low. Three weeks prior to the opening date of the tour, Rolling Stone contributor Andy Greene observed that "A quick glance at Ticketmaster shows oceans of unsold tickets at many shows with seats even in the back of the pavilion going for over $100 in certain markets." As "ticket sales flagged," Live Nation rebranded the tour as a twentieth anniversary celebration of Enema of the State, Blink's seminal 1999 album. Spencer Kornhaber at The Atlantic opined that it "seemed like a bid to lure the masses," while Greene noted, "In all likelihood, this move was designed to help move tickets that were probably priced a little too high to begin with." Star Tribune writer Chris Riemenschneider wrote that discount tickets were heavily promoted on Groupon, and noted that his city's venue moved fans with tickets to closer levels to the stage to account for the unused seats.

In addition to the sales, Wayne did not perform at several of the tour's shows. He nearly quit the tour only nine shows in, at the stop in Bristow, Virginia. He stopped mid-set, complained of the crowd size, and remarked that it may be his last night on tour. The next day he clarified on Twitter he would not be leaving: "I'm having too much fun with my bros blink-182." He later also skipped the Tampa date due to illness, the Irvine, California concert for "unforeseen circumstances", and a stop St. Louis after a run-in with the authorities. Mike Walters of TheBlast News reported that "One source pointed out that all [three] times he bailed, it was on a venue that guaranteed a smaller crowd than his usual stadium or arena performances, and our sources believe the rapper is intentionally skipping out on the smaller crowds."

Otherwise, reviews of the tour were positive. Scott Mervis for the Pittsburgh Post-Gazette found Blink "still a force of nature in a bold, flashy show with pyro, smoke jets and a spinning drum contraption for Barker to solo with backing tracks." Jillian Atelsek, reviewing their performance at Hersheypark Stadium for The Patriot-News, singled out Wayne's set as "more than just a prelude to blink-182's. It felt complete and impressive in its own right." NJ.com's Bobby Olivier dubbed the combination "summer's oddest couple," but also "electrifying". In contrast, Chris Kelly at The Washington Post bemoaned both acts' "road-weary antics," remarking that "nobody on stage seemed to be having fun." Riemenschneider of the Star Tribune stated the tour did not have a "good buzz," remarking that it might "have been a big hit as a frat party circa 2005."

=== El Paso shooting ===
The band were scheduled to perform at Don Haskins Center in El Paso, Texas on August 4, 2019, but the show was postponed following a mass shooting at a local Walmart store the day prior. The band announced the show was delayed "in solidarity with the community [...] Sending our love to the entire community of El Paso." Blink bassist Mark Hoppus tweeted that he was en route to El Paso's Cielo Vista Mall, which was near the Walmart where the shooting took place, when his security team texted him regarding the situation. Following that, the band were "locked down" in their hotel rooms. Lil Wayne was never booked for the show, as he had a prior commitment with Lollapalooza in Chicago. El Paso radio station KSII later reported that LiveNation, the promoter of the tour, announced that the date would not be rescheduled.

Hoppus later addressed the El Paso cancellation on Instagram:

Regarding El Paso, [...] There was no way we were going to play a show the next day. That would've been the ultimate disrespect, and to be honest I was probably too shaken to play the next day. We weren't able to schedule a timely make-up show, so rather than keep people's ticket money for months until we can return, we cancelled, so people can get their money back and decide next time we're able to come through if they want to come to the show. I hope they do. We're heartbroken over the entire thing.

== Set list ==
=== Blink-182 ===
This set list is from the concert on June 29, 2019, in Hartford. It is not intended to represent all shows from the tour

1. "Dumpweed"
2. "Don’t Leave Me"
3. "Aliens Exist"
4. "Going Away to College"
5. "What's My Age Again?"
6. "Dysentery Gary"
7. "Adam's Song"
8. "All The Small Things"
9. "The Party Song"
10. "Mutt"
11. "Wendy Clear"
12. "Anthem"
13. "Down" (acoustic)
14. "Wasting Time" (acoustic)
15. "Family Reunion"
16. "Feeling This"
17. "Bored To Death"
18. "Built This Pool"
19. "I Miss You"
20. "Cynical"
21. "Blame It On My Youth"
22. "First Date"
23. "Generational Divide"
24. "Dammit"

== Tour dates ==
List of 2019 concerts
Date	City	Country	Venue
June 20, 2019 (Note: This concert was a rehearsal show, attended by invite-only fans and family, and was not a part of the main tour.)	Los Angeles	United States	Galen Center
June 29, 2019	Hartford	United States	Xfinity Theatre
June 30, 2019 (Note: This concert was a Vans Warped Tour 25th anniversary reunion show.)	Atlantic City	United States	Atlantic City Beach
July 1, 2019	Saratoga Springs	United States	Saratoga Performing Arts Center
July 3, 2019	Noblesville	United States	Ruoff Home Mortgage Music Center
July 5, 2019	Hershey	United States	Hersheypark Stadium
July 6, 2019	Burgettstown	United States	KeyBank Pavilion
July 7, 2019 (Note: Lil Wayne was never scheduled for this date.)	Toronto	Canada	Budweiser Stage
July 9, 2019	Holmdel	United States	PNC Bank Arts Center
July 10, 2019	Mansfield	United States	Xfinity Center
July 11, 2019 (Note: Lil Wayne canceled his performance.)	Bristow	United States	Jiffy Lube Live
July 13, 2019	Bangor	United States	Darling's Waterfront Pavilion
July 16, 2019	Cuyahoga Falls	United States	Blossom Music Center
July 17, 2019	Darien	United States	Darien Lake Amphitheatre
July 20, 2019	Virginia Beach	United States	Veterans United Home Loans Amphitheater
July 21, 2019	Columbia	United States	Merriweather Post Pavilion
July 23, 2019	Charlotte	United States	PNC Music Pavilion
July 25, 2019	West Palm Beach	United States	Coral Sky Amphitheatre
July 26, 2019 (Note: Lil Wayne canceled his performance.)	Tampa	United States	MidFlorida Credit Union Amphitheatre
July 27, 2019	Atlanta	United States	Cellairis Amphitheatre
July 29, 2019	Jacksonville	United States	Daily's Place
July 31, 2019	The Woodlands	United States	Cynthia Woods Mitchell Pavilion
August 1, 2019	Austin	United States	Austin360 Amphitheater
August 2, 2019	Dallas	United States	Dos Equis Pavilion
August 5, 2019	Phoenix	United States	Ak-Chin Pavilion
August 7, 2019	Chula Vista	United States	North Island Credit Union Amphitheatre
August 8, 2019	Inglewood	United States	The Forum
August 27, 2019 (Note: Lil Wayne canceled his performance.)	Irvine	United States	FivePoint Amphitheatre
August 30, 2019	Ridgefield	United States	Sunlight Supply Amphitheater
August 31, 2019	Auburn	United States	White River Amphitheatre
September 2, 2019	West Valley City	United States	USANA Amphitheatre
September 4, 2019	Denver	United States	Pepsi Center
September 6, 2019	Wichita	United States	Hartman Arena
September 7, 2019	Council Bluffs	United States	Stir Cove
September 8, 2019	Bonner Springs	United States	Providence Medical Center Amphitheater
September 10, 2019	Clarkston	United States	DTE Energy Music Theatre
September 12, 2019	Saint Paul	United States	Xcel Energy Center
September 13, 2019 (Note: This concert is part of Riot Fest 2019.)	Chicago	United States	Douglass Park
September 14, 2019 (Note: Lil Wayne canceled his performance.)	Maryland Heights	United States	Hollywood Casino Amphitheatre
September 16, 2019	Cincinnati	United States	Riverbend Music Center
September 18, 2019	Camden	United States	BB&T Pavilion
September 20, 2019	Brooklyn	United States	Barclays Center

=== Box score data ===
List of concerts, showing date, city, venue, attendance, and gross revenue
Date	Venue	City	Attendance	Revenue
August 8, 2019	The Forum	Inglewood	12,540 / 12,540	$747,606
September 20, 2019	Barclays Center	Brooklyn	14,231 / 14,231	$885,645

== Canceled shows ==
List of canceled concerts, showing date, city, country, venue and reason for cancellation
Date	City	Country	Venue	Reason
August 4, 2019	El Paso	United States	Don Haskins Center	2019 El Paso shooting
September 22, 2019	Columbus	United States	Nationwide Arena	"Unforeseen production delays"
