= Nine (Blink-182 album) =

2019 studio album by Blink-182

Studio album by Blink-182
- Released: September 20, 2019
- Recorded: June 2018–July 2019
- Studios: Foxy Studios, Los Angeles; Opra Studios, North Hollywood; Rancho Pagzilla, North Hollywood; Studio 1111, Beverly Hills
- Genres: Pop-punk; pop rock
- Length: 41:40
- Label: Columbia
- Producers: John Feldmann; Tim Pagnotta; Andrew Watt; Travis Barker; Matt Malpass

Blink-182 chronology
California (2016)	Nine (2019)	One More Time... (2023)

Singles from Nine
- 1. "Blame It on My Youth" Released: May 8, 2019; 2. "Generational Divide" Released: June 21, 2019; 3. "Happy Days" Released: July 1, 2019; 4. "Darkside" Released: July 25, 2019; 5. "I Really Wish I Hated You" Released: September 6, 2019

Nine is the eighth studio album by American rock band Blink-182, released on September 20, 2019, through Columbia Records, as the band's first album on the label. The band began developing the album after fulfilling touring obligations for their previous release, California (2016). While producer John Feldmann returned from the previous album, Nine also utilizes additional producers and outside songwriters including Captain Cuts, the Futuristics, and Tim Pagnotta. It is the band's second and final album to feature guitarist/vocalist Matt Skiba, before the return of founding member Tom DeLonge in 2022.

Although Nine is sequentially Blink-182's eighth studio album, Hoppus and Barker consider it their ninth by retroactively counting the band's 1994 demo, Buddha, as their first. Hoppus also cited the significance of the number 9 as "the number of universal love, and the number of Uranus." The color wash album cover was painted by graffiti artist RISK. Much of the album's lyricism is dark in nature and was informed by world events, as well as Hoppus' battle with depression. Musically, the album augments the band's pop-punk sound with hip hop-inspired programming as well as electronics. For Nine, the trio moved from independent service BMG to major label Columbia.

Nine received mixed to positive reviews from music critics, many of whom complimented its upgrade to the band's signature sound and moodier lyrical content, but criticized its heavier production. It debuted at number three on the Billboard 200 domestically; it reached the top ten in Canada, Austria, Australia, Germany, and the United Kingdom as well. The band promoted the album with a North American co-headlining tour with rapper Lil Wayne, as well as five singles, including "I Really Wish I Hated You", which reached the top five on Billboard's Hot Rock Songs chart.

== Background ==
From 2016 to 2018, Blink-182 toured extensively in support of their previous album, California. After touring concluded, Skiba and Barker took time off from the band in order to focus on other projects. Skiba returned to Alkaline Trio to record their 2018 album, Is This Thing Cursed?, and tour in support of it, while Barker focused his energies on multiple different projects, including collaborations with Yungblud, Machine Gun Kelly, Suicideboys, XXXTentacion, and Lil Nas X. Hoppus, however, fell into a depression. Band manager Gus Brandt became concerned, as did Hoppus' wife, Skye. She implored him to focus on activities that made him feel happiest, which for him were writing and playing music. He decided upon the idea of fronting a solo album, with guest spots from familiar faces he had worked with over the years. His first call went to All Time Low vocalist/guitarist Alex Gaskarth, and their studio sessions evolved into Simple Creatures, a full-fledged side project. The duo released their first two extended plays, Strange Love and Everything Opposite, in 2019.

== Recording and production ==
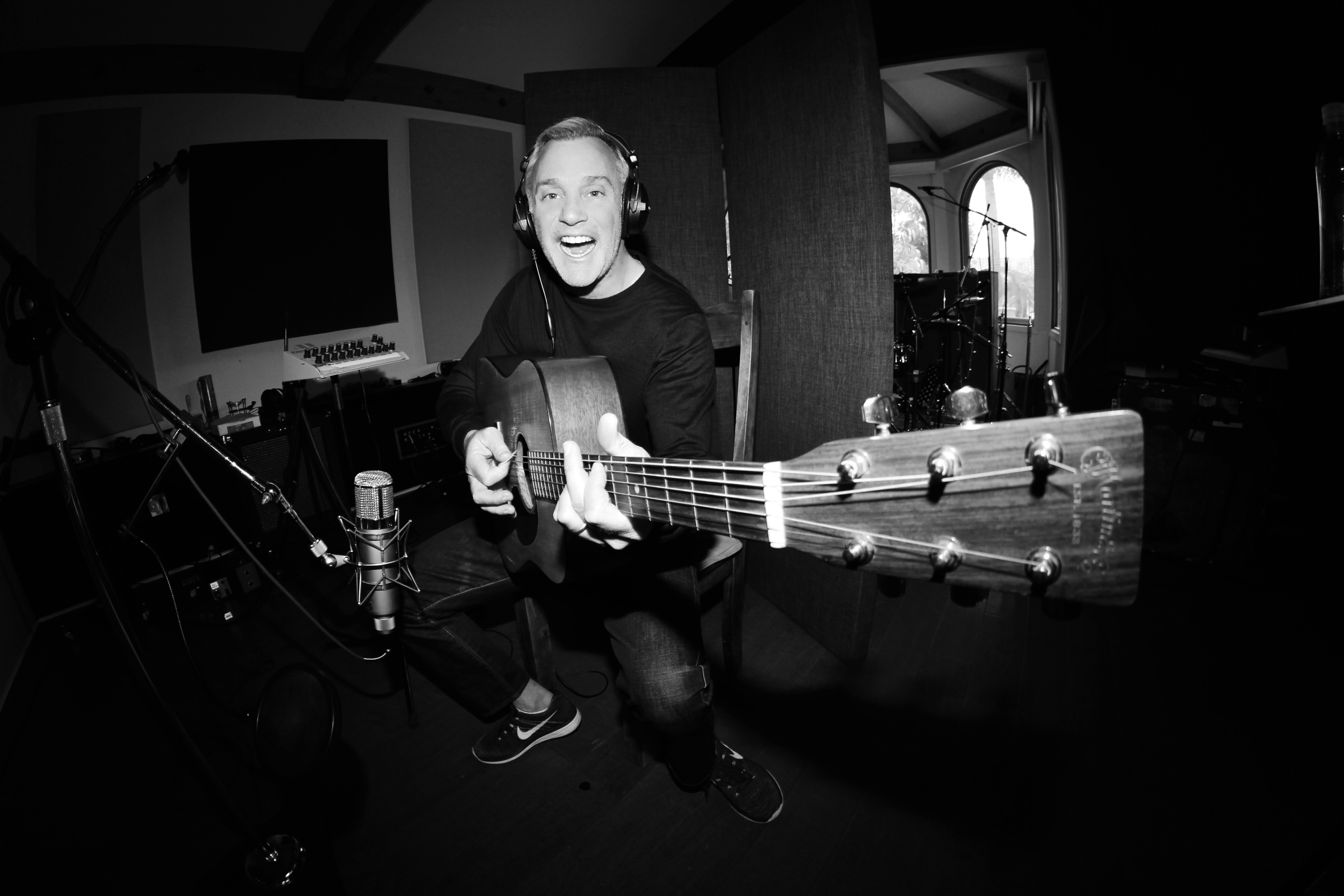
Much of Nine was co-written and produced by John Feldmann.

The band first began recording new music in April 2018, with the band members posting photos and videos to their respective social media accounts. The band continued collaborating with producer John Feldmann, as well as recording at their personal home studios. The trio recorded over 30 songs, largely in the same pop-punk vein as California. Midway through the process, the band became concerned the material felt too familiar and predictable. Barker was the first to voice concern, joking that it sounded like California 2: Electric Boogaloo. Hoppus and Skiba concurred, with Skiba later offering that the songs weren't "new or exciting." The group opted to begin again, this time with a new mindset—as well as outside help.

For Nine, the trio moved from independent service BMG to major label Columbia Records. Executives aimed to expand the band's reach into larger markets, specifically targeting a big pop radio crossover. The strategy was to start with the alternative format and gradually broaden to top 40 stations. To this end, the band enlisted a large number of professional songwriters. Hoppus likened the approach to a blind date, as prior to the sessions, the band members and producers/songwriters had yet to meet. Hoppus said they "[swung] for the fences [...] We pulled out all the stops. We brought in more cowriters and more top-shelf pop producers. Everybody had ideas on how we could achieve pop success while still being blink." Among the collaborators included singer Miley Cyrus, Pharrell Williams, The Futuristics, Captain Cuts, Andrew Watt, and Tim Pagnotta, with whom they wrote the singles "Blame It on My Youth" and "Happy Days". The latter two were written as the group became concerned the album was too lyrically dark and lacked positive songs.

Much of the new songs were built around Barker's drum beats, rather than guitar melodies. For Skiba, the unity of the band during the recording process helped solidify their friendships. "I now know my place better in Blink than I did years ago. We're always learning," he said. Musically, Nine infuses hip hop-inspired programming, electronics, and modern recording techniques into the band's punk rock sound. "Making sure Blink isn't different than modern music — rather than being something of the past — is a big achievement for me," Barker said shortly before the album's release. Steve Appleford of the Los Angeles Times describes the album as containing "postmodern effects and accelerated beats mingling with Blink-style vocal harmonies."

== Composition ==
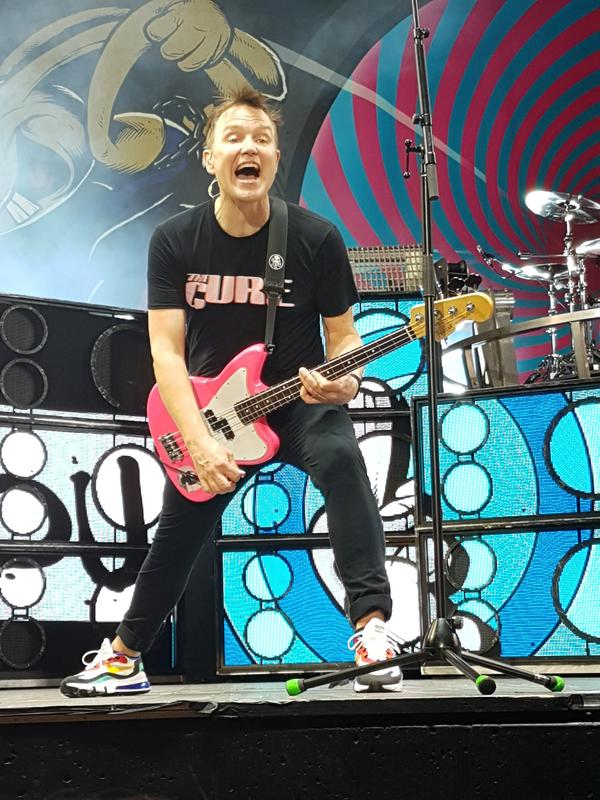
Lyrical content on Nine stemmed from Mark Hoppus' (seen here in 2019) struggle with depression.

Nine is considered a pop-punk and pop rock album. Lyrical subject matter on the album is largely dark in tone, frequently focusing on self-doubt and isolation. Christian Allaire of Vogue called it an album that focuses on "healing—from depression, anxiety, failed relationships, a broken political system." Many conversations with their outside songwriters began with discussing their worst fears and building a song around it. Hoppus hoped to capture more honesty in his songwriting, and as such, much of Nine is inspired by his battle with depression. "My brain naturally goes in cycles to dark places and I have to actively combat that," he told Matt Allen of Kerrang!. "I'm not in a place right now where I want to write happy, up-tempo songs." He turned to exercise as a method of countering the negative thoughts, as well as spending more time outdoors and reading books. He also struggled with his confidence: "I wake up every day like, 'I'm never going to write another good song,'" he said. Hoppus noted to Allen that a compulsion to check his phone and scroll on Twitter impacted his daily thoughts:

"It's a really strange time where everyone is on heightened alert," he said. "I wake up and look at Twitter, I get angry, and I start my day. It's unhealthy to live with this level of anger. I have to consciously make an effort to not look at the news a lot of the time and just say, 'Every single day there's some new outrage and a lot of the time it's not worth my time.' [...] The way everything is wired right now — between the news, and Twitter, and social media — everything spins so quickly that there's no time to take a breath."

In addition, world events—the presidency of Donald Trump, his border control policies, and the influx of mass shootings in the U.S.—were infused into Nine. Specifically, "Heaven" was written about a massacre at a bar in Thousand Oaks that took place just shy of two miles from Barker's California home in 2018. Other songs, such as "Black Rain", center on concepts of faith. Feldmann first sketched out the song as an uplifting embrace of salvation, but Skiba altered it to serve as a critique of organized religion. He had recently viewed the film Spotlight, and its investigation into the known abuses of children at the hands of the Catholic Church instilled a rage in him. "I took John's hopeful, churchy idea and painted it black [...] I have zero faith for the business of fear and war-mongering," he said. There are also multiple references throughout the album to using alcohol for self-medicative purposes. Hoppus noted to Allen that he and Skiba were not completely sober, and that the lyrical references capture his belief that "the world is looking for something to take the edge off, whether that be drinking or taking pills."

== Artwork and title ==
Barker was in charge of developing the artwork, as he had been on previous releases. He picked from four of his favorite artists, with the renowned graffiti artist RISK delivering the final artwork. His goal as an artist is to evoke emotion with color in an abstract sense, and to achieve this, he often uses the color wash technique. RISK calls this treatment "Beautiful Destruction", and everyone in the band loved his pieces enough to use for the album cover.

While in production, the band often referred to the album with the joke title Bojmir—or rim job backwards. Shortly after the album's announcement, Hoppus posted the meaning of the album's name on Reddit, stating that it is their ninth album. While Blink-182 had only released seven official studio albums prior to Nine, Hoppus also included their demo album, Buddha, as an official album:

NINE. This is our ninth album, as decided by me and Travis. Some count Buddha, some not. Some count The Mark, Tom and Travis Show. Some count Greatest Hits. Some count Dogs Eating Dogs. I'm counting Buddha, Cheshire Cat, Dude Ranch, Enema of the State, TOYPAJ, Untitled, Neighborhoods, California, and now Nine. Nine is also the number of universal love, and the number of Uranus.

== Release ==
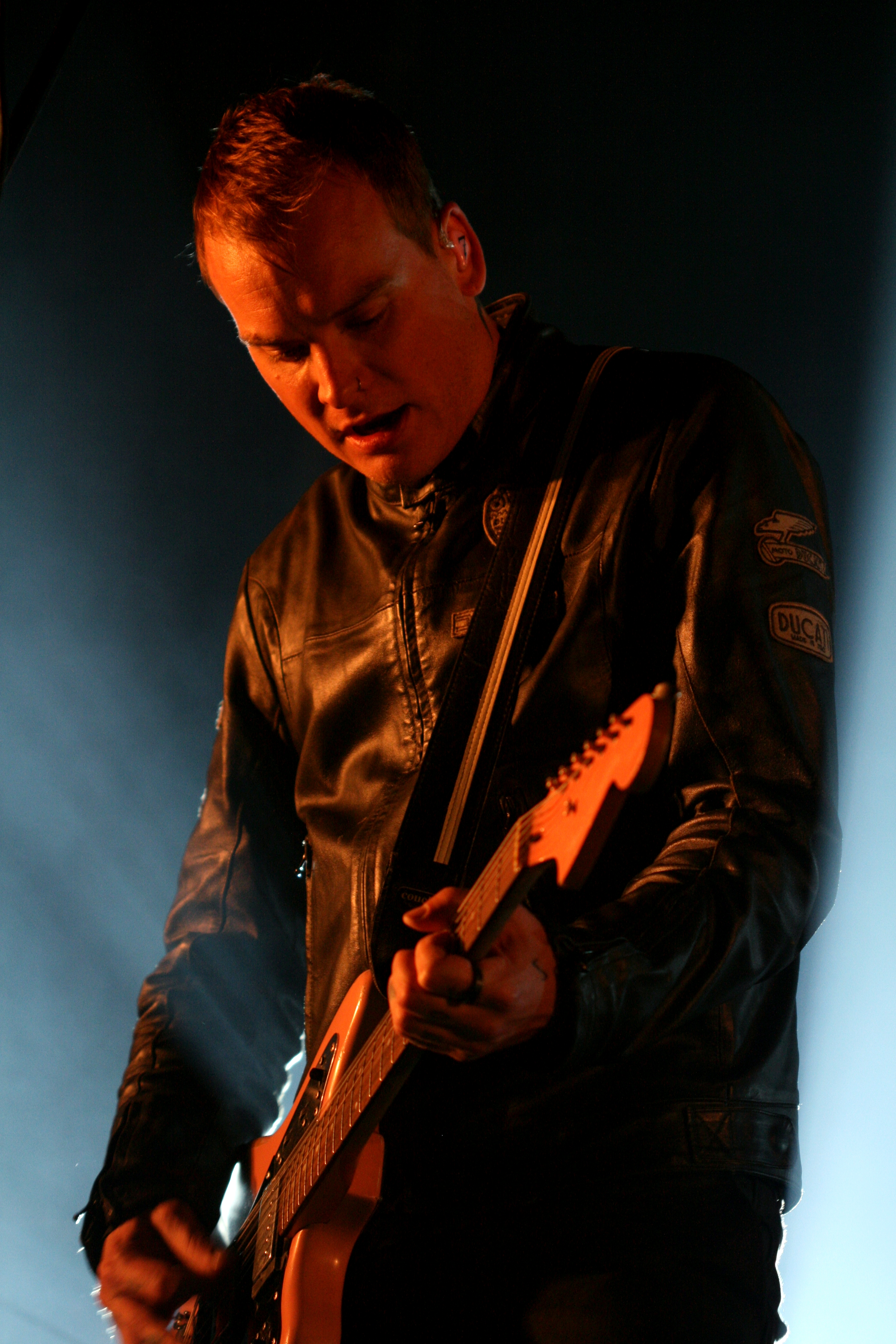
Nine is the second and final album to feature guitarist and vocalist Matt Skiba.

The band announced a 2019 headlining tour with rapper Lil Wayne on May 6, 2019 in support of the forthcoming album. Two days later, the trio released the lead single "Blame It on My Youth" with a lyric video online featuring Risk spray-painting the song's lyrics on a wall in a time lapse. The trio previewed an additional three songs prior to the album's release; "Generational Divide" was released on June 21, as was its accompanying music video, with "Happy Days" following on July 1. "Darkside" continued the pre-release strategy on July 26, with its official music video premiering on August 28. In addition, the group released “I Really Wish I Hated You” as the fifth and final single for the album on September 6.

The band started a text messaging newsletter in the days leading up to the release of the "Darkside" single, and has since updated it with previews of songs and links to new videos. The number could also be called to be greeted with a fifteen-second preview of "Darkside" as the answering machine.

The band announced Nine on July 25, 2019.

== Critical reception ==
Professional ratings
Aggregate scores
Source	Rating
Metacritic	67/100
Review scores
Source	Rating
AllMusic	3.5/5 stars
Consequence of Sound	C
Exclaim!	3/10
Kerrang!	4/5 stars
The Music	2.5/5 stars
NME	4/5 stars
Pitchfork	5.2/10
Rolling Stone	3.5/5 stars
Sputnikmusic	3.6/5
The Sydney Morning Herald	2/5 stars

Nine received mixed to positive reviews from music critics. At Metacritic, which assigns a normalized rating out of 100 to reviews from mainstream critics, the album has an average score of 67 out of 100, indicating "generally favorable reviews" based on ten reviews. AllMusic contributor Neil Z. Yeung considered it one of Blink's "strongest late-era efforts," praising its "commitment to vulnerability and honesty." Nick Catucci of Rolling Stone found it to be an "excellent album," commending the trio's self-awareness and maturity. Spencer Kornhaber of The Atlantic described its sound as "high-grade [and] ultra-processed", albeit "very, very catchy."

Many critics favorably compared Nine to the band's 2003 untitled effort. Ali Shutler of NME called it the "spiritual follow-up" to that LP, and said Nine showcases the band "back at their very best." Tom Shepherd at Kerrang! extolled the material's "rich personality", while Collin Goeman of Alternative Press dubbed it a "pop-punk record for the next generation."

Exclaim!'s Adam Feibel wrote a more negative review of Nine, heavily criticizing the album's adolescent themes. "Hoppus can't decide if he's writing for the kids or as a kid, churning out corny, melodramatic musings ripped from a high-school diary." Grant Sharples of online magazine Consequence of Sound felt the LP was "weighed down by stereotypical lyrics and cloying choruses." Nadine Smith at Pitchfork considered it "surprising how well the new sound works," but also "half as fun as the band used to be." Bobby Olivier from Spin critiqued it as a "largely insipid, punk-by-numbers [release]."

Loudwire named it one of the 50 best rock albums of 2019.

== Commercial performance ==
Nine debuted at number three on the US Billboard 200 with 94,000 album-equivalent units, including 77,000 pure album sales. To date it has sold over 202,000 copies worldwide and is the band's eighth US top 10 album. Nine debuted at number one on the US Rock Albums, US Alternative Albums, US Tastemakers Albums and US Vinyl Albums.

== Legacy ==
The promotional cycle of Nine was stunted by the onset of the COVID-19 pandemic, which took hold in March 2020. Single “Happy Days” received a crowdsourced at-home music video during lockdowns. Only “Blame It On My Youth”, "Darkside" and "I Really Wish I Hated You" were performed from the album in the brief window before the pandemic, including performances for Monday Night Football and ALTer Ego Festival. During the pandemic, the band kept recording, amassing nearly an album’s worth of material, but progress slowed as Hoppus began to battle cancer in 2021.

Following Tom DeLonge's return to the band and Skiba's subsequent departure in 2022, the band has yet to play any song from Nine live again. Hoppus has publicly expressed mixed feelings towards the album; in his 2025 memoir, Fahrenheit-182, he admits the pop crossover was unsuccessful, and assumed that perhaps "we strayed too far from what people liked about us in the first place," writing:

The [top 40] crossover never happened, partly because the songs didn’t connect as well and partly because the landscape had changed so much. It was a new world in music. [...] Instead of radio stations, we were catering to the websites and streaming services that had replaced them, like iHeartRadio and Spotify. And there wasn't much press left to speak of. It’s hard to be on the cover of a magazine when there are no magazines left. [...] Maybe there was no room in pop music for punk rock bands anymore.

== Track listing ==
Adapted from ASCAP and Apple Music.

No.	Title	Writer(s)	Lead vocals	Length
1.	"The First Time"	Mark Hoppus; Travis Barker; Matt Skiba; John Feldmann; Jim Lavigne; John Mitchell	Hoppus; Skiba	2:26
2.	"Happy Days"	Hoppus; Barker; Tim Pagnotta; Sam Hollander; Matt Malpass	Hoppus	3:00
3.	"Heaven"	Hoppus; Barker; Skiba; Feldmann; Chris Greatti	Hoppus; Skiba	3:17
4.	"Darkside"	Hoppus; Barker; Skiba; Feldmann	Skiba; Hoppus	3:00
5.	"Blame It on My Youth"	Hoppus; Barker; Skiba; Pagnotta; Hollander; Malpass	Skiba; Hoppus	3:05
6.	"Generational Divide"	Hoppus; Barker; Skiba; Feldmann; Benjamin Berger; Ryan McMahon; Ryan Rabin	Skiba; Hoppus	0:49
7.	"Run Away"	Hoppus; Barker; Skiba; Feldmann; Mitchell	Hoppus; Skiba	2:27
8.	"Black Rain"	Hoppus; Barker; Skiba; Feldmann	Skiba; Hoppus	2:46
9.	"I Really Wish I Hated You"	Hoppus; Barker; Skiba; Feldmann; Andrew Watt; Ali Tamposi; Nathan Perez	Hoppus; Skiba	3:11
10.	"Pin the Grenade"	Hoppus; Barker; Skiba; Feldmann; Joe Khajadourian; Alex Schwartz; Jake Torrey	Hoppus; Skiba	2:59
11.	"No Heart to Speak Of"	Hoppus; Barker; Skiba; Feldmann	Skiba; Hoppus	3:40
12.	"Ransom"	Hoppus; Barker; Skiba; Feldmann	Hoppus; Skiba	1:25
13.	"On Some Emo Shit"	Hoppus; Barker; Skiba; Feldmann; Joe Khajadourian; Alex Schwartz; Matthew Malpass	Hoppus; Skiba	3:09
14.	"Hungover You"	Hoppus; Barker; Skiba; Feldmann; Lavigne; Mitchell	Hoppus; Skiba	2:58
15.	"Remember to Forget Me"	Hoppus; Barker; Skiba; Feldmann; JP Clark; Jaramye Daniels	Hoppus; Skiba	3:29
Total length:				41:40

Japanese edition bonus track
No.	Title	Writer(s)	Lead vocals	Length
16.	"Out of My Head"	Hoppus; Skiba	Hoppus; Skiba	2:23
Total length:				44:03

== Personnel ==
Credits taken from the album's liner notes.

Blink-182

- Mark Hoppus – vocals, bass
- Travis Barker – drums, piano and programmed drums (3, 11, 14–15), producer (13)
- Matt Skiba – vocals, guitar

Additional musicians

- John Feldmann – producer (1, 3–4, 6–12, 14–15), instrumentation and programming (9), guitar (9)
- Tim Pagnotta – producer (2, 5), gang vocals (5)
- Brian Phillips – additional production and engineering (5), programming and gang vocals (5)
- Ian Walsh – programming and digital editing (5)
- Sam Hollander – gang vocals (5)
- Andrew Watt – producer (9), instrumentation and programming (9), guitar (9), vocals (9)
- Happy Perez – additional production (9), instrumentation and programming (9), guitar (9)

Design

- Chris Feldmann – art direction, design
- Mark Rubbo – CGI and neon design
- RISK – mural, track listing titles
- Sacha Waldman – mural photography

Technical personnel

- Matt Malpass – producer (13), additional production and engineering (5)
- The Futuristics – additional production (13)
- Scot Stewart – engineer (1, 3–4, 6–15), additional mixing (6, 12)
- Dylan McLean – engineer (1, 3–4, 6–15), additional mixing (6, 12)
- Michael Bono – assistant recording engineer (3, 7, 10, 14–15)
- Neal Avron – mixing (1–3, 8)
- Rich Costey – mixing (4, 6–7, 10–11, 14–15)
- Manny Marroquin – mixing (5)
- Serban Ghenea – mixing (9)
- Zakk Cervini – mixing (12–13)
- Chris Galland – mix engineer (5)
- John Hanes – mix engineer (9)
- Robin Florent – assistant mix engineer (5)
- Scott Desmarias – assistant mix engineer (5)
- KI Pipal – mixing assistant (6)
- Nik Tretiakov – mix assistant (12–13)
- Andrew "Schwifty" Luftman – production coordinator (9)
- Zvi "Angry Beard Man" Edelman – production coordinator (9)
- Sarah "Goodie Bag" Shelton – production coordinator (9)
- Drew "Grey Poupon" Salamunovich – production coordinator (9)
- Jeremy "Jboogs" Levin – production coordinator (9)
- David "Dsilb" Silberstein – production coordinator (9)
- Samantha Corrie "SamCor" Schulman – production coordinator (9)
- Daniel Jensen – crew
- Robert Ortiz – crew
- Darian Polich – crew
- Chris Athens – mastering (all except 9)
- Dave Kutch – mastering (9)

== Charts ==
=== Weekly charts ===
Chart (2019)	Peak position
Australian Albums (ARIA)	4
Austrian Albums (Ö3 Austria)	8
Belgian Albums (Ultratop Flanders)	16
Belgian Albums (Ultratop Wallonia)	48
Canadian Albums (Billboard)	5
Dutch Albums (Album Top 100)	37
French Albums (SNEP)	55
German Albums (Offizielle Top 100)	4
Irish Albums (IRMA)	23
Italian Albums (FIMI)	11
Japan Hot Albums (Billboard Japan)	85
Japan (Oricon)	55
New Zealand Albums (RMNZ)	21
Scottish Albums (Official Charts)	4
Spanish Albums (PROMUSICAE)	25
Swedish Albums (Sverigetopplistan)	58
Swiss Albums (Schweizer Hitparade)	13
UK Albums (Official Charts)	6
UK Rock & Metal Albums (Official Charts)	1
US Billboard 200	3
US Top Alternative Albums (Billboard)	1
US Top Rock Albums (Billboard)	1
US Indie Store Album Sales (Billboard)	1

=== Year-end charts ===
Chart (2019)	Position
US Top Rock Albums (Billboard)	56
