= Blame It on My Youth (Blink-182 song) =

Single by Blink-182

from the album Nine
- Released: May 8, 2019
- Genre: Pop rock; arena rock; electronic rock
- Length: 3:06
- Label: Columbia
- Songwriters: Mark Hoppus; Travis Barker; Matt Skiba; Tim Pagnotta; Sam Hollander; Matt Malpass
- Producer: Tim Pagnotta

Blink-182 singles chronology
"Parking Lot" (2017)	"Blame It on My Youth" (2019)	"Generational Divide" (2019)

"Blame It on My Youth" is a song recorded by American rock band Blink-182. The song was released on May 8, 2019, through Columbia Records, as the lead single from the band's eighth studio album Nine. It was written by bassist Mark Hoppus, drummer Travis Barker, and guitarist Matt Skiba, as well as producer Tim Pagnotta, and songwriters Sam Hollander and Matt Malpass. The track blends electronic and rock elements while lyrically reflecting on nostalgia, youth, and the band members' early experiences forming the group.

"Blame It on My Youth" was met with a notably divided fan reaction, though critics enjoyed its anthemic quality. The song debuted with a lyric video featuring renowned graffiti artist Risk. Its commercial performance was modest, with the song primarily charting within the top 10 on North American rock charts.

== Background ==
"Blame It on My Youth" originated from a drum pattern that drummer Travis Barker created that the band and their songwriters took and developed further. The song was produced and co-written by Tim Pagnotta, best known for his work with the Strumbellas, Neon Trees, and Plain White T's. Additional writers credited on the track include Sam Hollander and Matt Malpass. The song was their first release with Columbia Records, with whom they signed for Nine. Lyrically, the song nostalgically recounts the band members' upbringings, and how they came to start a band.

== Composition ==
John Aubert of All Punked Up described "Blame It on My Youth" as "a modern-pop-nostalgia track" which rings "true to failed youths on the dawn of the millennia". Andrew Sacher of BrooklynVegan labeled the song "fist-pumping, festival-ready 'whoa-oh' rock". However, in a review of the song's parent album Nine, Sacher unfavorably linked the song to "empty, Imagine Dragons-style arena rock". Jim Moster and Jacob Neisewander of The Observer noted that the band "declares victory over their childhood circumstances amidst a blend of electronic and rock elements" on "Blame It on My Youth".

== Commercial performance ==
"Blame It on My Youth" was sent to rock and alternative radio on May 14, 2019. It debuted at number 31 on Billboard's Alternative Songs chart, and slightly higher on the Hot Rock Songs chart at number 29. The song was added by over 60 radio stations in its opening week in North America, according to Hits columnist Ted Volk. The song ended up peaking at number nine on Billboard's Hot Rock Songs chart, and at position 11 on its sister ranking, Alternative Airplay.

"Blame It on My Youth" achieved its strongest chart performance in the Czech Republic, where it peaked at number four on the Modern Rock chart.

== Release and reception ==
The band announced the single one day after unveiling their 2019 headlining tour with rapper Lil Wayne; it premiered on May 8, 2019 on all streaming platforms, as well as on radio. Travis Barker also guested on KROQ's Kevin and Bean that morning and discussed the song's origins. It premiered with a lyric video online featuring famed graffiti artist Risk spray-painting the song's lyrics on a wall in a time lapse.

Lake Schatz at Consequence of Sound described the song as bouncy and anthemic, while Claire Shaffer of Rolling Stone said the song "celebrates their continued youthfulness and tendencies toward teenage rebellion." Ali Shutler at NME considered the tune a fearless exploration of a new sound, and reminiscent of "classic Blink."

Despite positive reviews from critics, "Blame It on My Youth" was poorly received by a large number of fans. Hoppus said that these reactions confused him, as he considered it "the most obvious Blink-182 song on the whole record," while Skiba thought it was funny that some fans thought it was a prank. In response to the feedback, Hoppus said "I can't try and write a song to hit a moving target of what I think people are going to expect Blink is or should be or what they want Blink to be... And we've never sat down with the intent of 'Let's write a radio single' because what is a radio single? I don't know what works with radio. I can't write a song for the radio." Hollander later wrote in his 2022 memoir 21-Hit Wonder: Flopping My Way to the Top of the Charts that the tune was "crucified by a portion of their fanbase. They wanted to try something new artistically and were willing to take the hate for it."

== Track listing ==
- Digital download
1. "Blame It on My Youth" – 3:06

== Personnel ==
Personnel taken from Nine liner notes.

Blink-182

- Mark Hoppus – vocals, bass
- Travis Barker – drums
- Matt Skiba – vocals, guitar

Additional personnel

- Sam Hollander – gang vocals
- Tim Pagnotta – production, gang vocals
- Brian Phillips – additional production, engineering, programming, gang vocals
- Matt Malpass – additional production, engineering
- Ian Walsh – programming, digital editing
- Manny Marroquin – mixing
- Chris Galland – mix engineer
- Robin Florent – assistant mix engineer
- Scott Desmarais – assistant mix engineer
- Chris Athens – mastering

== Charts ==
=== Weekly charts ===
Chart (2019)	Peak position
Czech Republic Modern Rock (IFPI)	4
US Hot Rock & Alternative Songs (Billboard)	9
US Alternative Airplay (Billboard)	11

=== Year-end charts ===
Chart (2019)	Position
US Hot Rock Songs (Billboard)	74

== Release history ==
Country	Date	Format	Label
United States	May 8, 2019	Digital download	Columbia
United States	May 14, 2019	Alternative radio	Columbia
United States	May 14, 2019	Rock radio	Columbia
