= I Really Wish I Hated You =

Single by Blink-182

from the album Nine
- Released: September 6, 2019
- Studio: Opra Studios (North Hollywood, California)
- Genre: Pop; pop rock
- Length: 3:11
- Label: Columbia
- Songwriters: Mark Hoppus; Travis Barker; Matt Skiba; John Feldmann; Andrew Watt; Ali Tamposi; Nathan Perez
- Producers: Andrew Watt; John Feldmann

Blink-182 singles chronology
"Darkside" (2019)	"I Really Wish I Hated You" (2019)	"Not Another Christmas Song" (2019)

"I Really Wish I Hated You" is a song recorded by American rock band Blink-182. The song was released on September 6, 2019 through Columbia Records, as the fifth and final single from the band's eighth studio album Nine. It was released as a single two weeks before the album was released. It was written by bassist Mark Hoppus, drummer Travis Barker, and guitarist Matt Skiba, as well as producers Andrew Watt and John Feldmann, and songwriters Ali Tamposi and Nathan Perez. The song explores the emotional fallout of a deteriorating relationship.

For the band, it was regarded as the toughest song to develop while writing Nine. It went through several iterations—including one involving a collaboration with pop star Miley Cyrus—before the trio settled on a version that suited them best. Critically, the song received negative reviews, with reviewers dismissing its polished, mainstream production and simple lyrical approach. Commercially, "I Really Wish I Hated You" only charted in the U.S., where it peaked within the top 15 of Billboard's rock charts.To promote the single, the band performed it in a pre-taped piece for a broadcast of Monday Night Football.

== Background ==
"I Really Wish I Hated You" is a collaboration with producer Andrew Watt and songwriters Ali Tamposi and Nathan Perez. Watt sings and plays guitar on the track, and Perez is also credited with guitar. John Feldmann, one of the producers of Nine, also contributed production work, instrumentation and programming, and guitar. The song was mainly recorded at Opra Studios, Barker's studio space in North Hollywood, California. Lyrically, the song centers on a relationship breaking apart.

Skiba and Hoppus regarded it as one of the toughest songs to develop for Nine, noting in an interview that it went through up to five different iterations. Skiba acknowledged that "there was a lot of push and pull from all different sides, and there were a lot of very talented and opinionated cooks in the kitchen from different musical backgrounds" that made finalizing the song difficult. In the end, the trio "chose the version that sounds the most like Blink, while still challenging the boundaries or lack thereof of Blink." An early edit of the song, featuring guest vocals from pop singer Miley Cyrus, surfaced online in April 2020. Hoppus expressed surprise at the leak, and confirmed that one iteration of the track featured the musicians collaborating.

== Composition ==
Andrew Sacher of BrooklynVegan described the song as "ultra glossy pop", stating that it is better suited for Taylor Swift's Lover, which was released two weeks before "I Really Wish I Hated You". Paul Brown of Wall of Sound described the song as a slow, "melodic, pop-rock track".

== Release and commercial performance ==
The band first teased the release of "I Really Wish I Hated You" on September 5, 2019, utilizing an automated phone number that, when texted, revealed a snippet of the tune. The full song premiered on September 6, 2019. The band played the song live for the first time only days later on September 12 at the Xcel Energy Center in Saint Paul, Minnesota. The performance was recorded and later broadcast on ESPN's Monday Night Football Genesis Halftime Show on September 23, 2019. Following this performance, it entered the top 20 of the US iTunes song sales chart.

"I Really Wish I Hated You" debuted at number 4 of the US Hot Rock Songs, at number 3 of the US Rock Digital Songs and number 6 of the US Alternative Digital Songs. It also peaked at number 13 on Billboards Alternative Songs chart in February 2020.

== Critical reception ==
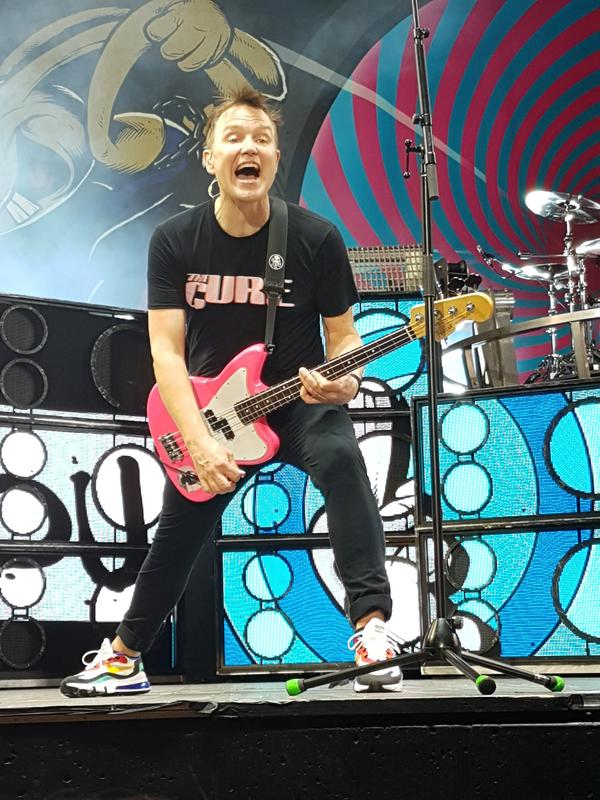
Critics found the song's narrative unusual for band bassist Mark Hoppus.

Critical reviews of the song were largely negative. Spencer Kornhaber of The Atlantic likened its songwriting to pop singer Halsey, calling its melody for kindergartners. Grant Sharples of online magazine Consequence of Sound similarly found its lyrical content "elementary", "forgettable," and repetitive. Tosten Burks from Spin noted that Hoppus's narrative of navigating a breakup seemed confusing given his status as a married man. Anna Smith of Gigwise too considered it odd that the song focuses on "teenage rejection" considering the band members' ages and cumulative years married. Exclaim!'s Adam Feibel, reviewing Nine, singled it among the LP's "worst offenders," comparing its narrative of a "toxic, dependent" male lover to Drake's 2015 single "Hotline Bling", with only "a fraction of the charm."

In contrast, Billboard columnist Bobby Olivier ranked it the second-best song on the LP, an "earworm" with the "right mix" between modern production and the band's catchy past. Vogue writer Christian Allaire deemed it a "catchy breakup track that veers way more pop than punk." Pitchfork contributor Nathan Smith viewed it a transparent bid for mainstream popularity, theorizing it was inspired by the Chainsmokers, with whom the band indeed collaborated with later in 2019 with the single "P.S. I Hope You're Happy".

== Track listing ==
- Digital download
1. "I Really Wish I Hated You" – 3:11

== Personnel ==
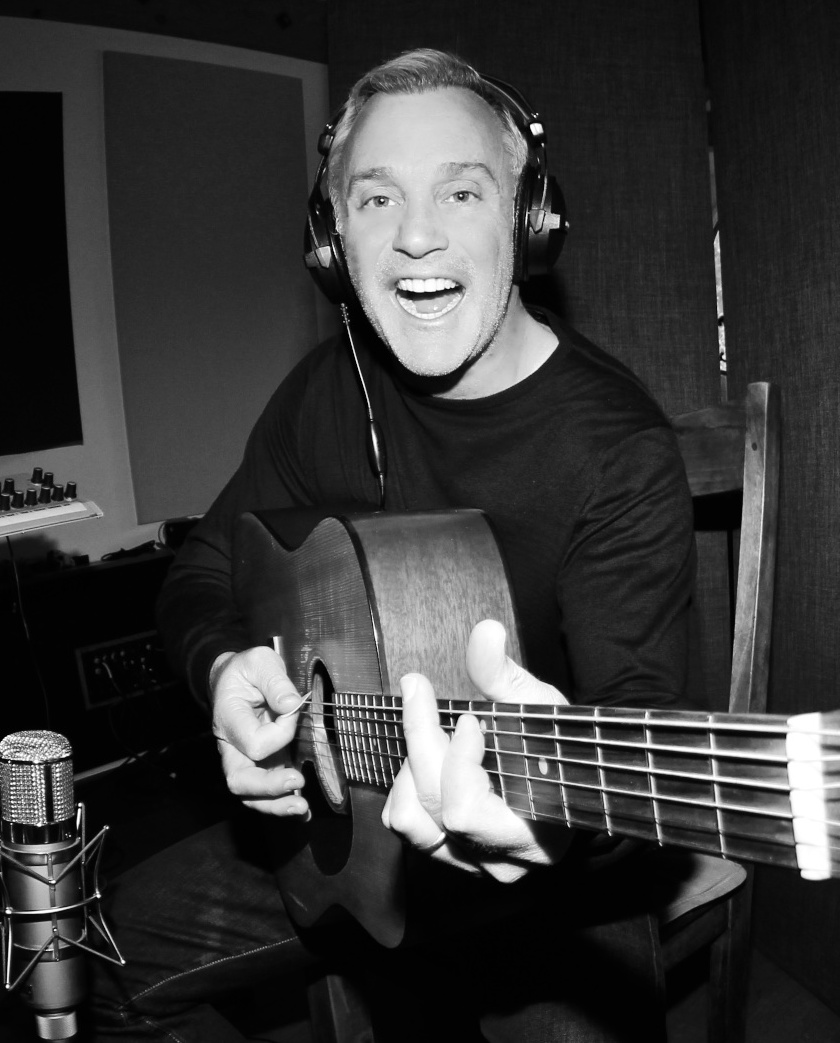
Producers Andrew Watt and John Feldmann (pictured) co-wrote "I Really Wish I Hated You", and contribute additional guitar and vocals.

Credits adapted from the album's liner notes.

Blink-182

- Matt Skiba – vocals, guitars
- Mark Hoppus – vocals, bass guitar
- Travis Barker – drums

Design

- Chris Feldmann – art direction, design
- Mark Rubbo – CGI and neon design
- RISK – title

Production

- Ali Tamposi – songwriting
- Andrew Watt – producer, songwriting, instrumentation and programming, guitar, vocals
- Andrew "Schwifty" Luftman – production coordinator
- Dave Kutch – mastering
- David "Dsilb" Silberstein – production coordinator
- Drew "Grey Poupon" Salamunovich – production coordinator
- Dylan McLean – engineer
- Nathan Perez – songwriting, additional production, instrumentation and programming, guitar
- Jeremy "Jboogs" Levin – production coordinator
- John Feldmann – producer, songwriting, instrumentation and programming, guitar
- John Hanes – mix engineer
- Samantha Corrie "SamCor" Schulman – production coordinator
- Sarah "Goodie Bag" Shelton – production coordinator
- Scot Stewart – engineer
- Serban Ghenea – mixing
- Zvi "Angry Beard Man" Edelman – production coordinator

== Charts ==
=== Weekly charts ===
Chart (2019)	Peak position
Czech Republic Modern Rock (IFPI)	5
US Hot Rock & Alternative Songs (Billboard)	4
US Alternative Airplay (Billboard)	13

==== Year-end charts ====
Chart (2020)	Position
US Alternative Songs (Billboard)	41
US Billboard Hot Rock & Alternative Songs	100
