= Happy Days (Blink-182 song) =

Single by Blink-182

from the album Nine
- Released: July 1, 2019
- Genre: Pop rock; pop-punk
- Length: 2:59
- Label: Columbia
- Songwriters: Mark Hoppus; Travis Barker; Tim Pagnotta; Sam Hollander
- Producer: Tim Pagnotta

Blink-182 singles chronology
"Generational Divide" (2019)	"Happy Days" (2019)	"Darkside" (2019)

"Happy Days" is a song recorded by American rock band Blink-182. The song was released on July 1, 2019 through Columbia Records, as the third single from the band's eighth studio album, Nine. The song is a contemplative, up-tempo track regarding personal frustration. It was written by bassist Mark Hoppus, and drummer Travis Barker, as well as producer Tim Pagnotta, and songwriter Sam Hollander. Hoppus developed the song's concept based on his personal struggle with anxiety and depression.

The song's music video was filmed during the COVID-19 pandemic, and depicts the band performing from home under quarantine. It also includes clips submitted by fans on social media doing daily tasks such as relaxing with pets or washing their hands. The video garnered the band two nominations at the 2020 MTV Video Music Awards, their first such nod in nearly two decades. The song received mixed reviews from critics, and only charted in the United Kingdom, where it peaked within the top 20 of the rock charts.

== Background ==
"Happy Days" examines personal anger and confusion. Blink-182 bassist Mark Hoppus, who delivers solo vocals on the track, developed the song's concept based on his own struggle with anxiety and depression, which had worsened when the band were recording Nine. In an interview, Hoppus said the song encourages listeners to "go to a better place and leave all this nonsense behind." In the chorus, Hoppus notes the "walls of isolation inside of my pain," adding, "And I don't know if I'm ready to change." The band premiered the song on July 1, 2019, the 182nd day of the year.

== Composition ==
"Happy Days" was described by Kerrang! as "a gorgeous three-minute piece of pop-rock perfection", while Andrew Sacher of BrooklynVegan described it as "slower-paced pop punk".

== Music video ==
The music video for "Happy Days" was directed by Andrew Sandler, and handled by the production company Underwonder Content. It was released on YouTube on April 9, 2020. In the clip, which was entirely filmed on smartphones and vertically angled, pictures Hoppus, Barker, and Skiba performing from their homes, intercut with footage of fans and friends. The concept for the video stemmed from the outbreak of the virus COVID-19 in the U.S., which forced many to quarantine at their homes and distance themselves socially. The band had requested two weeks prior on social media that fans send clips of themselves to appear in the video. The video features various daily behaviors such as interacting with pets, washing hands, and playing instruments. The clip features cameos from various celebrities, including Steve-O, Machine Gun Kelly, the Used frontman Bert McCracken and Bella Thorne.

The video was nominated for two categories at the 2020 MTV Video Music Awards: Best Rock Video and Best Music Video from Home but did not win. Blink-182 were last nominated for a VMA in 2002 for Best Group Video for their single "First Date"; as such, the nods were the band's first nominations in nearly two decades.

This was the band's final music video to feature Matt Skiba, as he departed the band following the return of Tom DeLonge in 2022.

== Reception ==
"Happy Days" only charted commercially in the United Kingdom, where it reached number 19 on the Rock and Metal chart compiled by the Official Charts Company. In Belgium, it did not chart, but was listed on the Ultratop Bubbling Under chart, which lists the top songs that have not yet charted on the main chart. In the band's home country, "Happy Days" did not enter the Alternative Songs chart, but peaked at number 12 on the Alternative Digital Songs chart.

Tom Breihan at Stereogum enjoyed the song, praising it as "heartfelt and catchy, and it's got that great Travis Barker drum-thunder underneath those pinched, hopeless hooks." Mackenzie Cummings-Grady, writing for music blog Popdust, criticized the song as formulaic and overly nostalgic: "'Happy Days' shows that our favorite middle-aged musicians are lost in translation, unable to articulate exactly what kind of band they are anymore."

== Track listing ==
- Digital download
1. "Happy Days" – 2:59

== Personnel ==
Personnel taken from Nine liner notes.

Blink-182

- Mark Hoppus – vocals, bass guitar
- Matt Skiba – guitars, backing vocals
- Travis Barker – drums

Production

- Tim Pagnotta – production
- Neal Avron – mixing
- Chris Athens – mastering

== Charts ==
Chart (2019)	Peak position
UK Rock & Metal (OCC)	19
