= Darkside (Blink-182 song) =

Single by Blink-182

from the album Nine
- Released: July 26, 2019
- Studio: Opra Studios (North Hollywood, California); Foxy Studios (Los Angeles, California); Studio 1111 (Beverly Hills, California)
- Genre: Pop-punk; post-punk; alternative rock
- Length: 3:00
- Label: Columbia
- Songwriters: Mark Hoppus; Travis Barker; Matt Skiba; John Feldmann
- Producer: John Feldmann

Blink-182 singles chronology
"Happy Days" (2019)	"Darkside" (2019)	"I Really Wish I Hated You" (2019)

"Darkside" is a song recorded by American rock band Blink-182. The song was released on July 26, 2019 through Columbia Records, as the fourth single from the band's eighth studio album Nine. It was written by bassist Mark Hoppus, drummer Travis Barker, and guitarist Matt Skiba, as well as producer John Feldmann. The song blends pop-punk with synth-pop and goth pop influences, pairing electronic production with the band's melodic songwriting. Its lyrics center on themes of unrequited love and unwavering devotion.

"Darkside" received generally positive reviews from music critics, who praised its catchy songwriting, synth-driven production, and dance-oriented rhythm, although some were less enthusiastic about its electronic sound. The song reached number seven on Billboard's Hot Rock & Alternative Songs chart. Its accompanying music video, directed by Andrew Sandler, featured the band performing in a school gymnasium alongside children performing dances popularized through the video game Fortnite, and drew a largely negative reaction from fans.

== Background ==
The song was primarily written by Matt Skiba. Skiba said he had envisioned "Darkside" as blink-182's take on Joy Division's "Disorder", explaining that, unlike Joy Division's unrelentingly bleak original, "Darkside" paired themes of struggle with a more energetic, danceable sound and blink-182's characteristic sense of humor. Bassist Mark Hoppus later identified "Darkside" as one of his favorite tracks on Nine, despite having relatively little involvement in its writing. He credited Skiba with shaping the song, praising his ability to write "catchy melodies and lyrics with a dark twist."

== Composition ==
Musically, "Darkside" is a synth-driven goth pop-punk song that places a greater emphasis on electronic textures than traditional guitar instrumentation. It blends blink-182's established melodic style with contemporary pop production, with synthesizers and programmed drum elements dominating much of the arrangement outside of its guitar-led chorus. Vocal duties are shared between Matt Skiba, who performs the opening verse and chorus, and Mark Hoppus, who sings the second verse and pre-choruses, while drummer Travis Barker is largely driven by a propulsive hi-hat pattern.

Lyrically, "Darkside" centers on unrequited love and unwavering devotion. Its narrator expresses a willingness to remain loyal to a woman described as "a girl dressed in black from another world," repeatedly declaring in the chorus, "I'm going to the darkside with you."

Critics noted the song's synth-heavy production and dance-oriented rhythm; Spencer Kornhaber of The Atlantic likened its choruses to the disco-influenced sound of The Killers. Andrew Sacher of BrooklynVegan felt that the song heavily leaned on post-punk. Mike DeWald of Riff Magazine noted that the song contains "alt-rock and atmospheric aspects".

== Release and commercial performance ==
Following the announcement of Nine on July 22, 2019, blink-182 teased "Darkside" on social media ahead of its release by posting the song's artwork alongside a telephone number. Calling the number played a 15-second preview of the track. The song was released three days later as the album's fourth promotional single.

"Darkside" reached number seven on Billboard's Hot Rock & Alternative Songs chart, becoming the band's first top-ten entry on the ranking. It spent four weeks on the chart, attaining its peak position in the issue dated October 5, 2019.

== Critical reception ==
"Darkside" received generally positive reviews from music critics, who praised its catchy melodies, energetic rhythm, and synth-driven production, although some reviewers were less enthusiastic about its electronic sound. Gil Kaufman of Billboard called it a "super-catchy tale of one-sided infatuation." Writing for Spin, Rob Arcand described "Darkside" as a "sugary single." Neil Z. Yeung at Allmusic called it an album highlight, citing its driving rhythm and energy.

Jacob Neisewander of The Observer described "Darkside", alongside "Pin the Grenade", as the "superior pop-punk jams" on Nine. Writing for NME, Ali Shutler described "Darkside" as "a weird little punk song that has absolutely no right being this joyful," arguing that it was the kind of song blink-182 "couldn't have made before now or with any other line-up." In a mixed review for The Sydney Morning Herald, Giselle Au-Nhien Nguyen called "Darkside" better than most of Nine, highlighting its dance-oriented percussion despite criticizing the album's electronic production.

== Music video ==
The official music video for "Darkside" premiered on August 28, 2019, and depicts blink-182 performing in an elementary school gymnasium wearing matching red outfits as a group of schoolchildren perform dances popularized through the online video game Fortnite. The band promoted the video on social media with the tagline "Here's a video for Darkside with a bunch of kids doing dances we don't know." The dancers are the primary focus of the video, with the band largely performing in the background. The video also includes scenes of Skiba performing on a playground jungle gym and Hoppus dancing beneath a disco ball. The clip was directed by Andrew Sandler.

Hoppus said the video's concept originated with Barker, who suggested recreating a viral video of schoolchildren performing a choreographed dance. The video was poorly received by a large number of fans, who questioned the target audience of Blink-182 as a whole, and felt confused by the video's direction.

== Track listing ==
- Digital download
1. "Darkside" – 3:00

== Personnel ==
Credits adapted from the album's liner notes.

Blink-182

- Matt Skiba – vocals, guitars
- Mark Hoppus – vocals, bass guitar
- Travis Barker – drums

Design

- Chris Feldmann – art direction, design
- Mark Rubbo – CGI and neon design
- RISK – title

Production

- Chris Athens – mastering
- John Feldmann – producer, songwriting
- Rich Costey – mixing
- Dylan McLean – engineer
- Scot Stewart – engineer

== Charts ==
Chart (2019)	Peak position
US Hot Rock & Alternative Songs (Billboard)	7
