= Generational Divide =

2019 song by Blink-182

Single by Blink-182

from the album Nine
- Released: June 21, 2019
- Genre: Hardcore punk; pop-punk; rock
- Length: 0:49
- Label: Columbia
- Songwriters: Mark Hoppus; Travis Barker; Matt Skiba; John Feldmann; Benjamin Berger; Ryan McMahon; Ryan Rabin
- Producer: John Feldmann

Blink-182 singles chronology
"Blame It on My Youth" (2019)	"Generational Divide" (2019)	"Happy Days" (2019)

"Generational Divide" is a song by American rock band, Blink-182. The song was released on June 21, 2019, through Columbia Records, as the second single from the band's eighth studio album, Nine. It was written by bassist Mark Hoppus, drummer Travis Barker, and guitarist Matt Skiba, as well as producer John Feldmann, and songwriters Benjamin Berger, Ryan McMahon, and Ryan Rabin. At just under a minute in length, the song embraces a hardcore style, built around a burst of aggressive, fast-paced punk energy. Hoppus developed the song after an argument with his son. It was ultimately trimmed from a longer, more complex composition.

Its release was accompanied by a music video directed by Kevin Kerslake, showing the band performing in a confined room covered in flyers from influential punk acts.

== Background ==
Unlike the band's previous single, "Blame It On My Youth", "Generational Divide" uses a noticeably more aggressive and darker tone, while also being much shorter than most of the band's previous singles.

The song is based on an argument Hoppus had with his son when driving him to the bus stop one morning before school. Afterwards, he went to the studio and wrote "Generational Divide" based on the fight. The theme of the song was "nothing changes if nothing changes." In an interview with Kat Corbett at SiriusXM's Lithium, Hoppus also explained that the song's brief length was the result of it being trimmed from a three-minute song preceding it. Initially, "Generational Divide" was a longer song with a very different structure: it shifted between three-quarter time and four-quarter time, which Hoppus described as reminiscent of the Beatles' "She's Leaving Home". In the end, the group preferred the snippet towards its conclusion where it grew faster, and simply decided to clip that portion off and release it.

== Composition ==
Charlotte Krol of NME noted the song's hardcore punk nature, while Paul Brown of Wall of Sound described "Generational Divide" as "fast and furious pop punk". Chad Childers of Loudwire noted that, despite its short length, it remains "50 seconds of high energy rock".

== Release and reception ==
Many critics noted that the song was particularly short, but also praised it for the more aggressive direction. Jon Blistein of Rolling Stone felt that the song "is a burst driving guitars and hardcore drums", while Chad Childers at Loudwire called it "a 'blink and you might miss it' cut". Additionally, Collin Goeman from Alternative Press pointed out Travis Barker's previous promises of returning to a sound more akin to the band's untitled album, calling it a "perfect illustration" of the statements.

Many fans speculated that the band released the song as a single in response to the backlash that "Blame It On My Youth" received from their fanbase. Hoppus denied these accusations, stating that "Generational Divide" had been written six months prior to "Blame It On My Youth".

== Music video ==
The music video was directed by Kevin Kerslake, and released on the same day as the song. It depicts the band playing in a small room with the walls, floor, and ceiling plastered with concert flyers from other notable punk rock acts, including but not limited to: Bad Brains, Bad Religion, Descendents, The Misfits, Iggy Pop, Meat Puppets, Melvins, Motörhead, Fugazi, Cro-Mags, The Vandals, G.B.H., THE GERMS, Youth of Today and Nirvana.

== Track listing ==
- Digital download
1. "Generational Divide" – 0:49

== Personnel ==
Personnel taken from Nine liner notes.

Blink-182

- Mark Hoppus – vocals, bass
- Travis Barker – drums
- Matt Skiba – vocals, guitars

Production

- John Feldmann – production
- Scott Stewart – engineering
- Dylan McLean – engineering
- Rich Costey – mixing
- KT Pipal – mix assistant
- Chris Athens – mastering
