= RISK (graffiti artist) =

American graffiti artist

- Born: Kelly Graval; Louisiana, U.S.
- Occupations: Graffiti Artist, Contemporary artist
- Website: https://www.riskrock.com/

RISK (born Kelly Graval), also known as RISKY, is a Los Angeles–based graffiti writer and contemporary artist often credited as a founder of the West Coast graffiti scene. In the 1980s, he was one of the first graffiti writers in Southern California to paint freight trains, and he pioneered writing on "heavens", or freeway overpasses. He took his graffiti into the gallery with the launch of the Third Rail series of art shows, and later created a line of graffiti-inspired clothing. In 2017, RISK was knighted by the Medici Family.

== Early history ==
Born to a Jewish family and raised in Louisiana, Graval moved with his family to Los Angeles in 1983 where he enrolled at University High School. During his time in high school, RISK began tagging his name throughout the school and started a graffiti crew, Prime Crime Artists, with a few of his friends. The artist then attended the Pasadena Art Institute and the University of Southern California, School of Fine Arts, both on full scholarships. Graval did commercial work as well, working for corporate clients including Budweiser and Playboy, and in 1987, he spray-painted the set for Michael Jackson's "The Way You Make Me Feel" music video. In 1989, RISK painted a set for the movie Bill and Ted's Excellent Adventure and has painted sets for music videos of artists including Red Hot Chili Peppers, Ice Cube and Bad Religion.

== Graffiti ==
RISK started spray painting train yards and freeway overpasses throughout Los Angeles in the early 1980s, when graffiti marking making on the West Coast was in its infancy. His moniker, RISK, is both a reference to the rebellious energy of graffiti culture, but also to the board-game. RISK's style of lettering incorporates the flow of Wild Style, but showcases the artist's interest in balance, color field theory and legibility. RISK has worked with the West Coast Artists crew and, in 1986, the artist painted a graffiti mural that was featured on the cover of Hot Rod Magazine. In 1989, RISK and his friend and fellow graffiti writer Slick, were asked to represent the United States at the Bridlington International Street Art Competition in the U.K, which they took home the silver cup.

== Murals ==
RISK expanded his practice from graffiti writing to include painting murals that explore color theory rather than lettering. In 2012, he worked on a project connected to the 2012 Summer Olympics in London at the London Pleasure Gardens. To support a project called ART History, RISK, alongside other renowned graffiti artists, painted the abandoned Miami Marine Stadium to raise money for the stadium's restoration in 2014. In 2019, Risk painted the largest public mural in Canada, at the disused St. Joseph's Health Centre site of Health Sciences North in Greater Sudbury, Ontario, as part of the city's Up Here Festival. That same year, RISK collaborated with MEAR ONE to paint a mural inspired by Art Nouveau artist, Alphonse Mucha at the Mayfair Hotel in Los Angeles. In 2020, he painted a mural for the Super Bowl LIV hosted in Miami, and, in 2023, RISK painted murals on the exterior walls of the Museum of Graffiti in Austin, Texas. RISK has collaborated with some of the most notable contemporary urban artists, including Futura, Ed Moses, Ron English, and Shepard Fairey.

== Fine Art and Sculpture ==
Starting in 2010, RISK began to utilize found objects in his work, including license plates, car hoods and scrap metal. Influenced by the Los Angeles Ferus Gallery and its emphasis on assemblage, activism and sculpture, RISK's sculptures incorporate similar themes.

=== Metallic Tissue, 2014 ===
For this series, RISK collected thousands of empty aerosol cans that he had used over years of art-making and flattened them to create his own innovative canvases.

=== Face Your Fears, 2018 ===
As an homage to Damien Hirst's infamous sculpture of a dead Tiger shark encased in formaldehyde, RISK created a 300-pound metal shark fashioned from license plates from all 50 states in the United States. A former surfer, RISK also intended the subject matter to reference his fear of encountering sharks in the ocean and the material choice of license plates to allude to the police as urban predators. Face Your Fears collides the artist's personal biography with a salient reference to one of the most controversial sculptures in art history.

== Exhibitions ==
RISK's work on canvas was featured in the benchmark 2011 "Art in the Streets" street art exhibition at the Museum of Contemporary Art, Los Angeles, curated by Jeffrey Deitch. RISK was one of five Los Angeles graffiti artists included. In 2018, his sculptures and graffiti tags were featured in "Beyond the Streets," a traveling exhibition of urban art curated by Roger Gastman. In 2019, several of his pieces were included in an exhibition at the California Museum of Art. RISK's canvas work has been on-view at museums around the country, including: the Museum of Fine Arts, Boston, the Graffiti Museum in Miami, the Honolulu Museum of Art, and the Pasadena Museum of California Art.

In July 2023, RISK participated as a special invited guest at the Los Angeles art and music collective Surf Skate Roots Rock, alongside of known skateboarder-artist pioneers such as Lance Mountain, Lonnie Toft, Marty Grimes Greyson Fletcher, and Steve Olson.

== Clothing ==
RISK founded Third Rail clothing line in 1992, one of the pioneering street wear lines. He has collaborated with fashion brands, such as Citizens of Humanity, Nike and lululemon to create clothing with his signature graffiti aesthetic. The artist has designed clothes for celebrities and musicians, including Red Hot Chili Peppers, Halsey, Kid Rock, House of Pain and Limp Bizkit.

== Publications ==
- Gastman, Roger. "Freight Train Graffiti." New York: Abrams, 2006.
- Alva, Robert. "The History of Los Angeles Graffiti Art." Alva & Reiling Publications, 2005.
- Grody, Steve. "Graffiti L.A." New York: Abrams, 2006.
