= Damon DeLaPaz =

American drummer

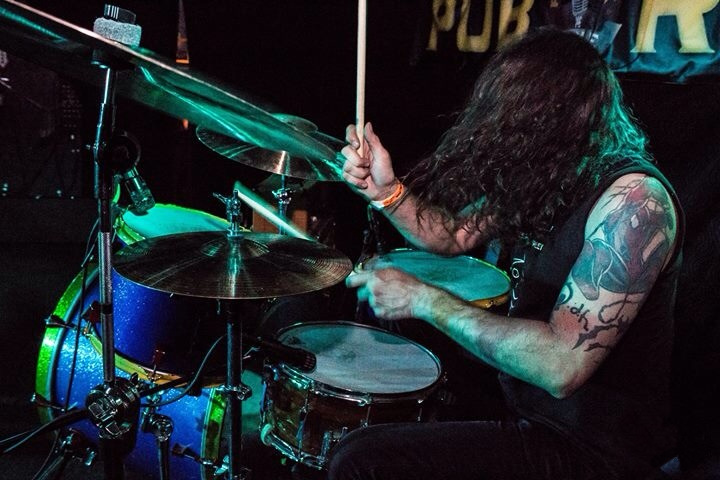
- DeLaPaz performing in 2014

Background information
- Born: July 22, 1974 (age 51)
- Origin: Houston, Texas, United States
- Genres: Punk rock, hard rock, crossover thrash
- Occupation: Musician
- Instrument(s): Drums, guitar
- Years active: 1995–present
- Labels: Drive-Thru Records; MCA Records; Ripple Music

Damon DeLaPaz (born July 22, 1974) is an American drummer, guitarist, and songwriter. He was a founding member of the punk rock groups Fenix TX, 30footFALL, Demasiado, and Sing The Body Electric. He has also recorded an instrumental solo project called Sci-Fi/Horror. DeLaPaz has recorded, performed and toured with a variety of different bands and also toured as a fill in drummer for Blink-182, The Vandals, Good Charlotte, Pulley, Home Grown, Ape Machine, Trash Talk, The Last Internationale, and more recently, Excel.

== History ==
=== 30 Foot Fall ===
DeLaPaz was recruited to play drums for 30 Foot Fall in the early 1990s by then drummer Rubio Cisneros and lead singer Butch Klotz. Touring Houston, Dallas, and Austin, 30 Foot Fall's popularity grew. The band at this point had developed their own sound, comparable to early NOFX or based on elements developed by Minor Threat.

DeLaPaz's first recording with the band was on the "Elementary School Love" 7". 30 Foot Fall then recorded and released their first full length LP, Divided We Stand on Fuzzgun Records in 1995 and began touring the United States extensively, eventually gaining a strong underground fanbase.

The band followed up their first LP with the Junior High Sucked 7" and in 1996 Fearless Records signed the band and produced their next record, Acme-143. DeLaPaz toured extensively with the band during their most active years before moving to California with his other band, Fenix TX.

=== Riverfenix / Fenix Tx ===
Fenix TX formed in late 1995 in Houston, Texas under the name Riverfenix by guitarists Will Salazar and Damon DeLaPaz (also the drummer for 30 Foot Fall at the time). The four piece played extensively on the Texan pop punk scene alongside such renowned bands as 30 Foot Fall, Good Riddance and Goldfinger.

In 1996, the band released their debut EP G.B.O.H. under the Houston-based record label Fuzzgun Records, which they then followed by playing the Mullets Across America Tour with Home Grown, Cousin Oliver and The Hippos. Two Mojo Records interns Richard and Stefanie Reines, were on the brink of starting their own label, Drive-Thru Records, and agreed to sign Riverfenix as their first band.

In December 1997, Drive-Thru released Riverfenix's thirteen-track full-length debut Riverfenix, produced by Jim Barnes. Within the following year, the album managed to sell out its first three print runs of 5,000 copies each. Blink-182's Mark Hoppus offered the band an opening slot on an upcoming Blink-182 tour, and eventually became their manager. Hoppus passed managing duties on to Blink-182 manager Rick DeVoe. While Fenix TX's song "Speechless" was slowly garnering radio airplay and major labels' attention, Hoppus' effort in promoting Riverfenix was overheard by Blink-182's record label MCA, who showed major interest in signing the band.

Riverfenix became Fenix TX. With a new record deal, Fenix TX re-recorded the majority of their 1997 eponymous album for their MCA debut Fenix TX with new tracks produced by Ryan Greene and mixed by Jerry Finn, and released it July 13, 1999. The album debuted at #115 on the Billboard 200 and reached #3 on Billboard's Top Heatseekers. The hit single "All My Fault" received heavy radio and TV airplay, triggered through the song's integration in the TV movie Jailbait (2000), which even featured a cameo appearance by Fenix TX. The music video, in return, starred Alycia Purrott from the cast of Jailbait, as well as Blink-182's Hoppus. "All My Fault" reached #21 on the Billboard Modern Rock charts.

Fenix TX went on numerous tours, including the Warped Tour and both national and international tours with label mates Blink 182 and New Found Glory. However, in late 2000, drummer Reyes left the band to pursue other interests. To compensate, DeLaPaz took over drumming duties for the band.

DeLaPaz's second recording with the band, Lechuza was released on May 22, 2001 and debuted on #87 of the Billboard 200, with its single "Threesome" reaching #66 on the UK Singles Chart. "Lechuza" featured DeLaPaz on Guitar as well as Drums. The album was produced by Jerry Finn and also includes Keyboard tracks performed by Roddy Bottum of the band Faith No More. The hidden track at the end of the album entitled "Kool-Aid", features DeLaPaz on all instruments. The instrumental song was inspired by a drum cadence that DeLaPaz and Salazar performed as part of the drum line in their high school marching band.

The decision to break up the band occurred in the middle of the writing process for what would have become Fenix TX's third album. On September 19, 2002, the disbandment of Fenix TX was officially announced. However, the band reunited again to record a live album at The Clubhouse in Tempe, Arizona, which was released under the title Purple Reign in Blood - Live on November 8, 2005. DeLaPaz's concept for the album's artwork merged the band's logo with the pentagram from Thrash Metal Band Slayer's logo on top of Prince's iconic glyph. The album's artwork resulted in a cease and desist order from Prince's attorneys.

=== Sing the Body Electric ===
After the breakup of Fenix TX in September 2002, DeLaPaz and Adam Lewis recruited singer Anthony Scalamere, bassist Jason Torbert and ex-Fenix TX guitarist James Love (who was replaced by guitarist/keyboardist Tony Montemarano in February 2004) for their experimental/hardcore side-project Big Black Boat. Soon after the formation, the name of the project was changed first to ChChCh HaHaHa and officially became Sing the Body Electric on February 15, 2004. Sing the Body Electric recorded their eponymous six song EP Sing the Body Electric, which was released by Restart Records on August 10, 2004. The band put on many energetic live performances in Southern California alongside bands such as Sparta and Unwritten Law, and embarked on one US tour opening for Fu Manchu.

Sing the Body Electric's musical style was completely different from that of Fenix TX, and tended more towards progressive rock and hardcore punk.

== Equipment ==
=== Kit ===
- Drums - Pork Pie Percussion Custom set
  - 13x9" Tom
  - 16x18" Floor Tom
  - 18x20" Floor Tom
  - 26x22" Bass Drum
  - 14x9" Pork Pie Percussion Custom Snare
- Cymbals - Amedia
  - 15" Hi-Hats
  - 22" Ride
  - 18" Crash
  - 6" Bell
- Sticks - Vater
  - Vater Signature Sticks.

== Discography ==
- 30footFALL - "Elementary School Love" 7" (Yo Mama's Records, 1994) - Drums
- 30footFALL - "Divided We Stand" LP (Fuzzgun Records, 1994) - Drums
- 30footFALL - "Jr. High Sucked" 7" (1996) - Drums
- 30footFALL - "Acme 143" LP (Fearless Records, 1997) - Drums
- 30footFALL - "Cartoons 7" (Die Cow Die Records, 1998) - Drums
- Riverfenix - "G.B.O.H." EP (Fuzzgun Records, 1996) - Guitar
- Riverfenix - S/T LP (Drive-Thru Records, 1997) - Guitar
- Fenix TX - S/T LP (MCA Records. 1999) - Guitar
- Fenix TX - "Lechuza" LP MCA Records. 2001) - Drums, Guitar
- Fenix TX - "Purple Reign In Blood Live" LP (MCA Records. 2005) - Drums
- Sing The Body Electric - S/T (Restart Records, 2004) - Drums
- Sci-Fi/Horror - S/T (Sci-Fi/Horror Records, 2006) - All Instruments
- Demasiado - "May The Horse Be With You" LP (Sci-Fi/Horror Records, 2006) - All Instruments
- Demasiado - "EP" (Sezio Records, 2006) - Drums, Guitar
- Demasiado - "One Night In A Vision Cult" - Drums, Guitar
- Lindsey Cook - "Cold Days" EP (Sezio Records, 2007) - Drums, Guitar
- Demasiado - "Birth of a Worm in the Inner Ear" (2008) - Guitar
- Avitia - "Oceanside Boulevard" EP (Broken Note Records, 2008) - Drums, Percussion
- ManOverboard - "Port Towns" (2011) - Drums
- Doom, Doom, Doom - "Exiles" (2012) - Guitar
- Ape Machine - "Mangled By The Machine" (2013) - Drums
- Ape Machine - "Live at Freak Valley" (2014) - Drums
- Ape Machine - "Coalition of the Unwilling" (2015) - Drums
