= CRE.EP =

EP by Fenix TX
- Released: September 30, 2016
- Recorded: 2010–2016
- Length: 18:04
- Label: Cyber Tracks

Fenix TX chronology
Purple Reign in Blood (2005)	CRE.EP (2016)

CRE.EP is the second EP released by American band Fenix TX. It is their first EP released since changing the band's name to Fenix TX. It is the band's first studio release of since their album Lechuza. CRE.EP is the band's first release without longtime member Damon DeLaPaz and the last release to feature vocalist William Salazar. It is the last studio material to include Adam Lewis on bass before his death in June 2024. The first track, "Spooky Action at a Distance", first appeared on the soundtrack of MLB 13: The Show.

== Track listing ==
All tracks are written by Adam Lewis, Chris Lewis, William Salazar, and Hayden Scott; except where noted

No.	Title	Length
1.	"Spooky Action at a Distance"	4:04
2.	"Church and State"	3:11
3.	"Bending Over Backwards" (Salazar)	3:45
4.	"Get Loose"	2:58
5.	"I Don't Know What to Say"	4:06
Total length:		18:04

== Personnel ==
Fenix TX

- William Salazar – vocals, guitar
- Chris Lewis – guitar, backing vocals
- Adam Lewis – bass, backing vocals

Additional musicians

- Hayden Scott – drums
