= Pork pie (disambiguation) =

A pork pie is a type of meat pie.

Pork pie may also refer to:

- Pork Pie (film), a 2017 remake of New Zealand film Goodbye Pork Pie
- Porkpie (TV series), a British sitcom
- Pork pie hat, style of men's hat worn since the mid-19th century
- Pork Pie Percussion, a drum company started in 1987 by Bill Detamore

== People ==
- Jonny Porkpie (born 1974), New York City-based writer and director
