= I Feel So =

Single by Box Car Racer

from the album Box Car Racer
- Released: June 6, 2002
- Recorded: 2002
- Studio: Signature Sound & O'Henry Sound Studios
- Genre: Post-hardcore; pop-punk; emo
- Length: 4:31 (album version); 3:32 (piano intro version); 3:24 (guitar intro version)
- Label: MCA
- Songwriters: Thomas DeLonge; Travis Barker
- Producer: Jerry Finn

Box Car Racer singles chronology
"I Feel So" (2002)	"There Is" (2002)

"I Feel So" is the debut single released by Box Car Racer from their eponymous album. The single peaked at number eight on the Billboard Modern Rock Tracks chart.

== Background ==
An instrumental version of "I Feel So" is present on the cassette edition of the Box Car Racer album, replacing the last track, “Instrumental”.

== Track listing ==
All tracks are written by Tom DeLonge and Travis Barker, and arranged by Box Car Racer.

CD single
No.	Title	Length
1.	"I Feel So" (piano intro)	3:32
2.	"I Feel So" (guitar intro)	3:24

US maxi single
No.	Title	Length
1.	"I Feel So" (piano intro)	3:32
2.	"I Feel So" (album version)	4:31
3.	"There Is"	3:11
4.	"I Feel So" (music video)	3:32

UK maxi single
No.	Title	Length
1.	"I Feel So" (album version)	4:31
2.	"I Feel So" (guitar intro)	3:24
3.	"Cat Like Thief" (featuring Tim Armstrong of Rancid and Jordan Pundik of New Found Glory)	4:20
4.	"I Feel So" (music video)	3:32

7" single
No.	Title	Length
1.	"I Feel So" (album version)	4:31
2.	"Cat Like Thief" (featuring Tim Armstrong of Rancid and Jordan Pundik of New Found Glory)	4:20

== Music video ==
Box Car Racer on set for the "I Feel So" music video.

The music video for the song features scenes switching between the band playing in what appears to be a basement with "Box Car Racer" written in graffiti on the wall, along with the track titles of all the songs on the eponymous album, and two children (a boy and a girl) asleep in their bedrooms. The storyline was inspired by the "Muncie, Indiana" scene of the 1977 science fiction film Close Encounters of the Third Kind by Steven Spielberg (where the boy awakens in the night and his toys start operating on their own). The boy's possessions start to shake as the first chorus starts and the young girl's eyes water as she takes a rose off of her windowsill and its petals fall off. The video achieved some airplay on MTV, and massive success on MTV2, MuchMusic and Fuse TV. The video was directed by both singer Tom DeLonge and Nathan "Karma" Cox. The clip was filmed on March 21, 2002 at a studio in Burbank, California. The video was later released on the Box Car Racer DVD. The album version of the song is a minute longer than the version used in the music video, due to the guitar intro being removed, but the piano intro is still kept in.

== Charts ==
=== Weekly charts ===
Weekly chart performance for "I Feel So"
Chart (2002)	Peak position
Scotland Singles (OCC)	40
UK Singles (OCC)	41
UK Rock & Metal (OCC)	6
US Bubbling Under Hot 100 (Billboard)	20
US Alternative Airplay (Billboard)	8

=== Year-end charts ===
Year-end chart performance for "I Feel So"
Chart (2002)	Position
US Modern Rock Tracks (Billboard)	50
