= There Is =

Single by Box Car Racer

from the album Box Car Racer
- Released: August 19, 2002
- Recorded: 2001
- Studio: Signature Sound & O'Henry Sound Studios
- Genre: Acoustic rock; emo; pop-punk
- Length: 3:17
- Label: MCA
- Songwriters: Thomas DeLonge; Travis Barker
- Producer: Jerry Finn

Box Car Racer singles chronology
"I Feel So" (2002)	"There Is" (2002)

"There Is" is the second and final single from Box Car Racer's eponymous album. The single peaked at number 32 on the Billboard's Modern Rock Tracks chart.

The band performed the song live on The Tonight Show with Jay Leno on September 3, 2002, and on The Late Late Show with Craig Kilborn on October 17, 2002. Guitarist and vocalist Tom DeLonge still occasionally plays a solo version of this song in concert with Angels & Airwaves. In 2024, Blink-182 performed the song as part of a medley alongside +44's "When Your Heart Stops Beating".

== Track listing ==
1. "There Is" (Radio edit) – 3:08
2. "Tiny Voices" – 3:27

== Music video ==
In the music video, the band plays the song in the rain outside of a house, where a teenage boy is trying to get a girl to talk to him from her bedroom window. During the video, people come out of their houses trying to make the band stop. A policeman comes and takes away Tom DeLonge towards the end, as the boy runs into the girl's house and upstairs to her room to see her. The music video for the song was inspired by the film Say Anything... (1989), and was directed by Alexander Kosta. It can be seen on the Box Car Racer DVD.

== Charts ==
Chart (2002)	Peak position
US Modern Rock Tracks (Billboard)	32

== Release history ==
Region	Date	Format(s)	Label(s)	Ref.
United States	August 19, 2002	Alternative radio	MCA	
