= Bickley (band) =

American punk rock band

- Origin: Houston, Texas, U.S.
- Genres: punk rock, skate punk, hardcore punk
- Years active: 1995–2001, one off reunions 2002-2018, 2023-present
- Members: Uncle Dig; Dave Wreckoning; Rubio Coconut; Greg Urgitate

Bickley is an American punk rock band from Houston, Texas, United States, originally active from 1995 until 2001. The band's name is a word derived from Robert De Niro's character in Taxi Driver, Travis Bickle.

Influenced primarily by the likes of The Vindictives, The Queers and Screeching Weasel, Bickley delivered a simple yet powerful sound. Bickley's first full-length studio recording was Pogo Au Go-Go (PaperDoll), a full-length CD issued in 1996. They quickly developed a loyal following in the Houston, Texas area. By 1998, Bickley had been picked up by Fearless Records, and the Pogo Au Go-Go CD was re-released under that label. In late 1998, Bickley released their second CD, Kiss The Bunny, also on Fearless records. By this time their fan base extended across the US, and they often toured the Southwest US region, with short stints across the West Coast, East Coast, and the Deep South.

Bickley's final release, Fat, Drunk and Stupid, captured their raucous live show at their favorite venue, Fitzgerald's, in Houston Texas. Fat, Drunk and Stupid was released in August 2001 through PaperDoll Records.

Bickley were also noted by the music press for the adult content of their songs, and the unique character of lead singer Ben Fondled's voice.

Bickley's core lineup (singer Ben Fondled, guitarist Uncle Dig, and drummer Dave Wreckoning) did not change from the time of their 1998 re-release under Fearless Records. Bickley switched between two bass players in the 1998-2001 period, driven by the availability of the players: Rubio Coconut (from the successful Houston punk rock band, 30 Foot Fall) and Bill Fool. Rubio began touring the country with 30footFALL and Bill was brought in to replace him in late 1997. Matte Finish was the original drummer for the band, and is the drummer on the Down the Hatch 7", on Pogo Au Go-Go, and on some songs that appeared on Kiss the Bunny.

In 2001, at the peak of their popularity, Bickley split up citing the need for more personal time with their respective families. The band has reunited at various times since August 2001 for special benefit and reunion shows.

Bickley (including both Rubio Coconut on bass and Bill Fool on rhythm guitar) recently reunited for one night on July 20, 2013 at Fitzgerald's in Houston, TX for 30footFALL's 20th anniversary show. They re-released Down The Hatch on vinyl and released a greatest hits album entitled, "Good To See You Again, Asshole!", which includes 20 tracks of fan favorites from the band's two studio albums.

They reunited twice in 2015 for their 20th Anniversary Show as well as the 30footFALL Christmas Show, as well as two appearances in 2018 as a memorial for Chris LaForge and the final 30footFALL Christmas Show at Fitzgerald's.

Bickley played their first show in three years in January 2023 at The Black Magic Social Club in Houston for the You Ain't Punk show, playing a set as The Vindictives. This show saw the revamped lineup of Bickley, with Uncle Dig replacing Ben Fondled as lead vocalist, and Greg Urgitate from Monster Soup joining as second guitarist.

== Band members ==
Current

- Uncle Dig – guitars (1995–2001; reunions; 2023-present); lead vocals (2023–present)
- Greg Urgitate – guitars, backing vocals (2023–present)
- Rubio Coconut – bass, backing vocals (1995–1997; reunions; 2023-present)
- Dave Wreckoning – drums, backing vocals (1998–2001; reunions; 2023-present)

Former

- Ben Fondled - lead vocals (1995-2001; reunions)
- Bill Fool - bass, backing vocals (1997-2001; guitars, backing vocals (reunions)
- Matte Finish- drums, backing vocals (1995-1998)

== Discography ==
=== Studio albums ===
- Pogo Au Go-Go (1996) (PaperDoll)
- Pogo Au Go-Go (1998) (Fearless) (re-release)
- Kiss The Bunny (1998) (Fearless)
- Fat, Drunk and Stupid (2001) (PaperDoll)

=== 7" and Tapes ===
- Down The Hatch (1995) (7" on PaperDoll)
- Texas Tag Team Up (1998) (7" on Chicken Ranch Records) split w/ The Put-Downs

=== Compilations ===
- Punk Bites 2 (1999) (Fearless)
- Punk til ya Poop (1999) (Bad Stain Records)
- Good To See You Again, Asshole! (2013) (Little T&A Records)

== See also ==
- 30 Foot Fall
