= Terrified (Blink-182 song) =

Song by Blink-182

from the album One More Time...
- Released: October 20, 2023
- Recorded: 2018–2021 (Box Car Racer version; unreleased); 2023 (Blink-182 version)
- Genre: Punk rock
- Length: 2:48
- Label: Columbia
- Songwriters: Mark Hoppus; Tom DeLonge; Travis Barker; Nick Long
- Producer: Travis Barker

"Terrified" is a song by American rock band, Blink-182. It is the fourth track from their ninth album, One More Time... The song was originally written by guitarist Tom DeLonge and drummer Travis Barker for their early 2000s side project, Box Car Racer. Following its recording for One More Time..., bassist Mark Hoppus was also credited as a songwriter, alongside additional songwriter Nick Long. The song was produced by Barker, Long, and Aaron Rubin. The Box Car Racer version remains unreleased.

== Background ==
Following the release and touring in support of Blink-182's fourth album, Take Off Your Pants and Jacket, guitarist Tom DeLonge began writing songs with the intent of exploring more of his post-hardcore influences. As he continued to write, DeLonge invited his bandmate and drummer, Travis Barker, and longtime friend, David Kennedy, to record with him, which would eventually become enough for them to start Box Car Racer. Soon after the release of the band's 2002 self-titled album, the band went on tour to promote the album. The band broke up in mid 2003 after tensions started to rise up between DeLonge and his bandmate and bassist Mark Hoppus, who felt betrayed after DeLonge didn't include Hoppus as a part of the project.

After a conversation between DeLonge and Barker a few years after DeLonge's second departure from Blink-182, ideas were created to revive the project and record another Box Car Racer track. The song was written in 2018, while the recording process circulated between 2018 and 2021.

News of an unreleased Box Car Racer song began to surface in late 2020, when Barker was asked in an interview if there would ever be new music from the side project:

"So, there is a Box Car song that's unreleased. I think whenever the time's right or it makes sense, we're gonna release it. I would just love for the fans to hear that song." - Travis Barker

DeLonge later confirmed these claims the following year, stating that he and Barker had recorded it within the last few years. News on the song went dark until early 2023, when Barker claimed that the song would never be released. At the time of these claims, Blink-182 was in the middle of recording their ninth album, One More Time..., which marked DeLonge's return to the band after a seven year absence. While recording the album, DeLonge and Barker discussed the idea of releasing "Terrified" on One More Time..., despite not being a single, which they ultimately agreed on. In an interview with Zane Lowe, the two called the song "a gem," and expressed how happy they were that they could have it on this album. As Box Car Racer caused a large amount of resentment between DeLonge and Hoppus, there were questions of if including "Terrified" on One More Time... would cause tension between the two again. When asked about the song in his Discord server, Hoppus clarified that this wasn't the case:

"My old ego would've rejected the boxcar song out of hand but this whole album was about getting past all that shit and just making music. It turned out so good." - Mark Hoppus

== Composition ==
Paul Brown of Wall of Sound described "Terrified" as carrying "punk rock vibes", comparing the song structure to that of "Tiny Voices" by Box Car Racer.

== Reception ==
The song has been well received by many critics, many of which favorably compared it to multiple songs from their untitled album. Emily Carter of Kerrang! called the song an "explosive easter egg," noting how the song originated from Box Car Racer. Paolo Ragusa of Consequence heavily praised DeLonge's guitar playing, while also making comparisons to not just Box Car Racer, but DeLonge's later side project, Angels & Airwaves.

== Personnel ==
Credits adapted from the song's YouTube video.

Blink-182

- Mark Hoppus – bass guitar, bass engineering, songwriting
- Tom DeLonge – vocals, guitars, songwriting
- Travis Barker – drums, producer, songwriting

Other musicians

- Kevin Bivona – piano, synthesizer

Production

- Travis Barker – producer
- Nick Long – co-producer, songwriting
- Aaron Rubin – co-producer, recording
- Nick Morzov – recording
- Kevin Bivona – recording
- Eric Emery – recording
- John Warren – recording
- Kevin "Thrasher" Gruft – recording
- Adam Hawkins – mixing
- Henry Lunetta – mix assistant
- Mark Hoppus – bass engineering
- Randy Merrill – mastering

== Charts ==
Chart performance for "Terrified"
Chart (2023)	Peak position
New Zealand Hot Singles (RMNZ)	30
US Hot Rock & Alternative Songs (Billboard)	38
