= Punk Bites 2 =

Compilation album by Various artists
- Released: 1997
- Genre: Punk rock
- Label: Fearless

Punk Bites 2 is a punk rock compilation album released by Fearless Records in 1997.

== Track listing ==
1. Calling All Punks - Bickley

2. Two On Glue - NOFX

3. Simpley-Fy - Pulley

4. Subhumanitarian Homewrecked Blues - 30footFall

5. Gimmie, Gimmie, Gimmie - Pennywise

6. Falling Down - Bigwig

7. On The Counter - Discount

8. Self Appointed Leader - Gob

9. GSF - MxPx

10. Just Like Me - Strung Out

11. Basement Diaries - The Drapes

12. Revolve - Straight Faced

13. My So Called Real World - Slick Shoes

14. 7 Minutes - Backside

15. Police Truck - Whitekaps

16. Holiday Road - Whippersnapper

17. More Than Friends - Home Grown

18. Another Boring Day - 98 Mute

19. Nutso Smasho - Quincy Punx

20. Charmed (...I'm Sure) - Dynamite Boy

21. Pulling Worms Apart - Apocalypse Hoboken

22. P.O.C. - Chuck

23. Excuses - Sam The Butcher

24. Bruce Wayne - Assorted Jellybeans

25. Go To The Dentist - The Crowd

26. Feel Better Today - Krhissy

27. Just Around The Corner - Horace Pinker

28. Detroit - Ballgagger

29. Dumb As Rocks - Boredom

30. Fit - The Outside
