= Pork Pie Percussion =

American drum manufacturer

- Type: Private
- Industry: Musical instruments
- Founded: 1987; 39 years ago
- Founder: Bill Detamore
- Headquarters: Canoga Park, California, United States
- Key people: Bill Detamore (President)
- Products: Drum kits and hardware
- Website: porkpiedrums.com

Pork Pie Percussion is a US musical instrument manufacturing company based in Canoga Park, California. Established in 1987, it has been producing handmade Drum kits and hardware since then. Part of the products are manufactured in Taiwan.

== History ==
In 1987, Bill Detamore –a drummer himself– started making drums as a hobby, then evolving to a more professional grade. The company's name was taken from a New Zealand movie called Goodbye Pork Pie as Detamore stated in an interview.

By 2006, the company had only 9 employees and its drums were sold with Bill Detamore's signature and the date of manufacture.

Recently, Pork Pie has introduced the Little Squealer line, the Piglite acrylic line and the Big Black Brass snare drums. The Big Black Brass drum as well as the Little Squealers are MADE IN TAIWAN. Piglite drums are made in California. The Little Squealer line has grown from one snare drum to a 4-piece drumset and 4 assorted snare drums.

In addition to drum manufacturing, Pork Pie also offers services that include drum restoration, customizing, and refinishing. Bill Detamore has done customizing for many big bands from Van Halen to Yes and Fleetwood Mac to Framing The Red, Marilyn Manson, Blink 182 and Guns N' Roses.

== Drumset lineup ==
Pork Pie offers three types of drumsets. The Little Squealer line is a mid line drum that is made in Taiwan. The Piglite line are acrylic shelled drums hand-crafted in California. Everything else is hand-crafted and made-to-order.

== Artists ==
Musicians that use/have used Pork Pie drums are:

- Tim Alexander (Primus)
- Damon DeLaPaz (Fenix TX)
- Frank Ferrer (Guns N' Roses)
- William Fish (Framing the Red)
- Keith Hanson (The House Harkonnen)
- Matt Hayward (Band of Skulls)
- Jevin Kaye (Much The Same)
- Rory Koff (No Use For a Name)
- Byron McMackin (Pennywise)
- Chris Cox (All Hallowed)
- Butch Norton (The Eels)
- Marky Ramone (The Ramones)
- Dave Raun (Lagwagon)
- Scott Raynor (Blink-182)
- The Rev (Avenged Sevenfold)
- John "Saucy Jack" Kramer (Kilmaine Saints)
