= Cigar (band) =

American punk rock band

- Origin: Eugene, Oregon, U.S.
- Genres: Punk rock, skate punk
- Years active: 1996–2004, 2013 (show reunion)–present
- Labels: Theologian Records; Fat Wreck Chords
- Members: Rami Krayem; Jon Sortland; Jonathan Hischke
- Past members: Jeff Jones; Jason Torbert

Cigar is an American punk rock band from Eugene, Oregon, and, later, San Diego, California, United States. Cigar was formed in 1996, discovered by Fletcher Dragge of the band Pennywise and signed to Theologian Records in 1997. Its first album, Speed is Relative, was released in 1999 and produced by Fletcher Dragge. The band also appeared on several punk compilations and surf and skate videos (including Toy Machine's "Jump off a Building" during Chris Senn's part).

== History ==
In 1996, Jon Sortland, alias "Big Jon" (The Shins, Broken Bells, Circus Tents) and Jason Torbert (Goddamn Electric Bill) met through the local classified advertisements. Following this, Jeff Jones (Circus Tents) joined the band as a guitarist. Badly needing a singer, Sortland, then working at a local movie theater, asked everyone who came in if they would like to be in a band and Rami Krayem was found. After recording the first demos, Jones left the band and Krayem took over on guitar.

== Reunion ==
In 2013 and in 2016, Cigar reunited to headline a benefit show for Music 4 Cancer in Ste-Therese, Quebec, Canada. In 2014, Cigar headed back to Quebec to play Amnesia Rockfest alongside bands including Blink 182, Weezer, Alice in Chains, and more.

== Lineup change ==
In June 2019, after 23 years in Cigar, Jason Torbert announced on Cigar's Facebook page, that he left the band in January 2019 to "focus on my family and continue to make music when possible." Bassist Jonathan Hischke replaced Torbert shortly after. In 2022, Cigar released their debut Fat Wreck Chords release, The Visitor.

== Band members ==
=== Current ===
- Rami Krayem – vocals, guitar
- Jon Sortland – drums, vocals
- Jonathan Hischke – bass guitar (2019–present)

=== Past ===
- Jeff Jones – guitar (1996–1997)
- Jason Torbert – bass guitar (1996–2019)

== Discography ==
- Speed is Relative (1999) Theologian Records

Track listing

1. "No More Waiting"
2. "Mr. Hurtado"
3. "Two Kevins"
4. "Wright & Rong"
5. "Laundry Basket"
6. "Back To Home"
7. "The Bind"
8. "Nick Of Time"
9. "Long Run"
10. "Watch It Fall"
11. "Weight Of The World"
12. "Show Me"
13. "Captain"
14. "Dr. Jones"
- The Visitor (2022) Fat Wreck Chords

Track listing

1. "These Chances"
2. "Legacy of the 7 Plies"
3. "We Used To"
4. "Gone Wrong"
5. "The Loss"
6. "In Armor"
7. "Classic You"
8. "Forget About Me"
9. "Move On"
10. "Knocked Down"

== Soundtracks ==
- 1998 Jump Off A Building - Toy Machine
- 1999 The Year - A Curran Film
- 2001 TK5 - The Kill Five
- 2002 TK6 - The Kill Six
