= Kiss the Bunny =

Kiss The Bunny

Studio album by Bickley
- Released: November 10, 1998
- Recorded: March 1998
- Genre: Punk Rock, Skate Punk, Hardcore Punk
- Length: 45:24
- Label: Fearless
- Producer: Dan Workman

Bickley chronology
Pogo Au Go-Go (1996/1998)	Kiss The Bunny (1998)	Fat, Drunk and Stupid (2000)

Kiss The Bunny was the second full-length album by Bickley, released in 1998 through by Fearless Records. This album pushed Bickley from a regional punk rock success into national exposure.

== Track listing ==
1. "Roommate 29"
2. "Calling All Punks"
3. "Two Ton Tessie"
4. "Fuckwall"
5. "Natalie"
6. "So Fucking Stupid"
7. "William Lester Brown III"
8. "Bert and Ernie"
9. "Say Something"
10. "You Getta Pettum"
11. "My Best Friends Girlfriend"
12. "Uncle Borloff"
13. "William Walks"
14. "The Abyss Sucks"
15. "She's My Beer"
16. "Punk Rock Girl"
17. "Bad Natalie"
18. "Legion of Beer"
19. "Dino"
20. "Prom Night"
21. "Passout"
22. "Rover Passed Away"
23. "Somebody's Gonna Get Their Head Kicked in Tonight"

== Personnel ==
- Ben Fondled - vocals
- Uncle Dig - guitar, vocals
- Bill Fool - bass, vocals
- Rubio Coconut - bass, vocals
- Dave Wreckoning - drums, vocals
- Matte Finish - drums, vocals
- Dan Workman - Producer
