= Jason Torbert =

American musician

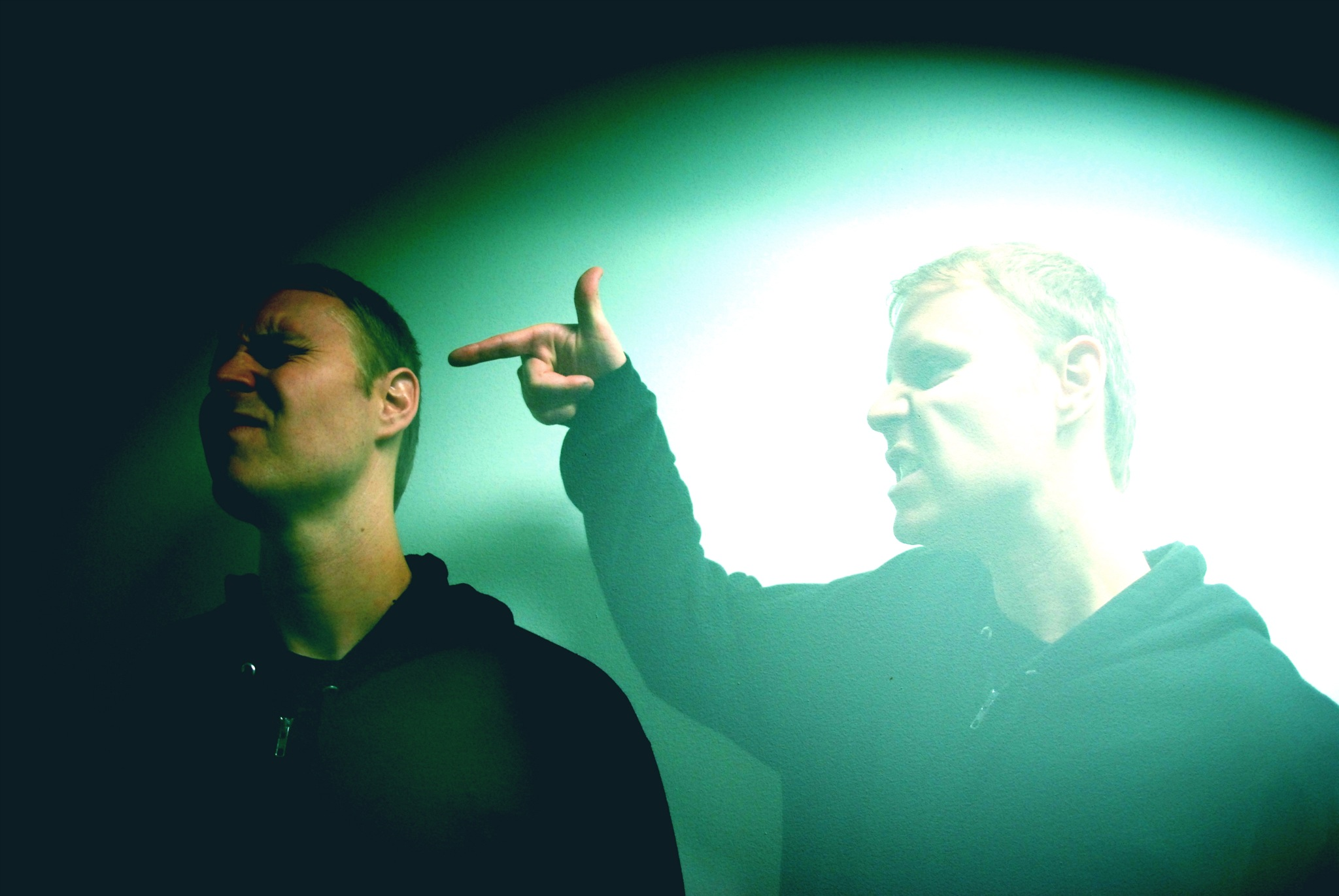
- Swallowed by the Machines Promo

Background information
- Origin: Davis, California, US
- Genres: Electronic music Folktronica; Ambient music Skate Punk
- Instruments: Bass; Guitar; Vocals; Keyboards
- Years active: 1998–present
- Labels: Pro.Con Records; 99X/10 Records; Restart Records; Theologian Records
- Website: http://www.goddamnelectricbill.com

Jason Torbert is an American musician currently in the solo project Goddamn Electric Bill on the record label 99X/10 (founded by keyboardist Roger O'Donnell of The Cure (and previously, The Psychedelic Furs, Thompson Twins and Berlin)). Torbert has also played bass in several other bands, including Cigar (with Jon Sortland (The Shins, Broken Bells) and Rami Krayem) and Sing The Body Electric (with Damon DeLaPaz and Adam Lewis (Fenix TX)).

== Discography ==
=== With Cigar ===
- Speed is Relative (Theologian Records, 1999)
- The Early Demos, (Self-Released, 2007)

=== With Goddamn Electric Bill ===
- The Only Power To Please (Pro.Con Records, 2005)
- Nothing Concrete – 99X/10 Label Sampler, (99X/10 Records, 2006)
- Swallowed by the Machines (99X/10 Records, 2006)
- Dntel – Dumb Luck Remixes, (Sub Pop, 2007)
- Erin Lang – Foundlings and Strays (99X/10 Records, 2008)
- Topics For Gossip (99X/10 Records, 2008)
- IMMOOR – She Moves, 2010
- Jazz (Pro.Con Records, 2011)
- Dead Alive (Pro.Con Records, 2012)

=== With Sing The Body Electric ===
- S/T (Restart Records, 2004)

== TV and film uses ==
- "Birth of a Star" appeared in the film Opposite Field which played at the Toronto International Film Festival and DOC NYC
- Composer for the short film, NSFW which premiered at the 2013 Santa Barbara International Film Festival
- "Clouds and a Bee" appeared in an episode of One Tree Hill
- "Pull The Lever" and "Less Evil" appeared in the film Like Crazy which won the Sundance Grand Jury Prize for Best Film at the 2011 Sundance Film Festival
- "End Credits" appeared in an episode of The Real World: New Orleans
- Composer for the film, Douchebag which premiered, in Dramatic competition, at the 2010 Sundance Film Festival
- "Lost in the Zoo" appeared in an episode of Cameron Crowe's television series Roadies on Showtime, a trailer for the movie Spooner, an episode of The Real World: Cancun, and in a commercial for Tri-Cities Regional Airport
- "Birth of a Star", "Fairytale Orchestra", "Country Jam", "Everyone's Turning Back", and "Lost in the Zoo" appeared in commercials for Etnies
- "Country Jam" and "Everyone's Turning Back" appeared in episodes of The Real World: Hollywood
- "Country Jam" appeared in an episode of Real World/Road Rules Challenge: The Island
- "In Memory" and "The Morning Commute" appeared in episodes of The Real World: Brooklyn
- "Oui-Ja" appeared in an episode of Keeping Up with the Kardashians
- "Witching Hour", "Wake Me Up", "Clouds and a Bee" and "Looking Up at Down" appeared in episodes of Giuliana and Bill
