= Jon Sortland =

American drummer

- Jon Sortland at La Maroma, 22 November, 2024

Background information
- Born: September 12, 1973 (age 53); Vancouver, Washington, United States
- Genres: Rock, punk rock, indie rock
- Occupations: Musician, singer-songwriter, record producer, video director
- Years active: 1989–present
- Labels: Columbia Records; Wedge Records; Dowd Records; Theologian Records; ORG Music

Jon Sortland (born September 12, 1973) is an American musician, record producer and video director, currently playing the drums for indie rock band The Shins. Sortland has also played drums, bass, keyboards and backing vocals in the band Broken Bells. Sortland also writes and performs in his own bands, EV Kain and Cigar.

== History ==
In the late 1980s, Sortland started The Circus Tents, a northern California skate punk band with Matt Wedgley (The Force, Dirty Filthy Mugs, Viva Hate), Scot Pickering, Jeff Jones and Chad Cox. The band self-released their 12-song cassette tape in 1991, followed by their EP (Hard Up) in 1992. Both releases had songs featured in several skateboarding videos (Powell, Toy Machine).

In 1996, Sortland formed Cigar with Rami Krayem on guitar and lead vocals, and Jason Torbert on bass. Cigar, produced by Fletcher Dragge of Pennywise, released their debut album, Speed is Relative, in 1999 on Theologian Records. Throughout the 2000s, Sortland performed and recorded with several other bands and producers until starting his current band E V Kain. E V Kain released their "Clear" 7-inch in late 2012 and is currently active. The most recent release from E V Kain is a split 7-inch record with Mike Watt and The Secondmen. In 2022, Cigar released their debut Fat Wreck Chords release, The Visitor.
