= Pogo Au Go-Go =

Pogo Au Go Go

Studio album by Bickley
- Released: 1996
- Recorded: 1996
- Genre: punk rock, hardcore punk
- Label: PaperDoll (1996) Fearless (1998)
- Producer: Dan Workman

Bickley chronology
Down The Hatch 7 (1995)	Pogo Au Go Go (1996)	Kiss The Bunny (1998)

Pogo Au Go Go is the first album by Houston punk rock band Bickley, released in 1996 by PaperDoll Records. After Bickley signed on to Fearless Records, the album was re-released in 1998. The album led to Bickley gaining wide local exposure.

== Personnel ==
- Ben Fondled – vocals
- doopy mcsqueeg – guitar, vocals
- Matte Finish – drums
- Rubio Coconut – bass

Additional personnel

- Dan Workman – producer
- Bill Fool – Backing vocals

== Track listing ==
1. "Call Girl" (1:04)
2. "Johnny Dynomite" (1:09)
3. "Silly Monkey" (1:17)
4. "Communication" (1:58)
5. "Bad Car" (1:26)
6. "Down The Hatch" (1:58)
7. "Sally" (1:41)
8. "This Song Sucks" (2:08)
9. "Human Habitrail" (1:18)
10. "Mission and Vallejo" (2:53)
11. "Box Car" (originally by Jawbreaker) (1:32)
12. "Arkansas Death Ride" (2:04)
13. "Piss Fetish" (1:24)
14. "Teen Porno Star" (1:49)
15. "Sniffy" (2:03)
16. "Pink Power Ranger" (1:49)
