= Box Car Racer =

American post-hardcore band (2001–2003)

- The group during the music video for "I Feel So".

Background information
- Origin: San Diego, California, U.S.
- Genres: Post-hardcore; pop-punk; alternative rock; emo; punk rock
- Years active: 2001–2003
- Label: MCA
- Spinoffs: Angels & Airwaves
- Spinoff of: Blink-182
- Past members: Tom DeLonge; Travis Barker; David Kennedy; Anthony Celestino
- Logo
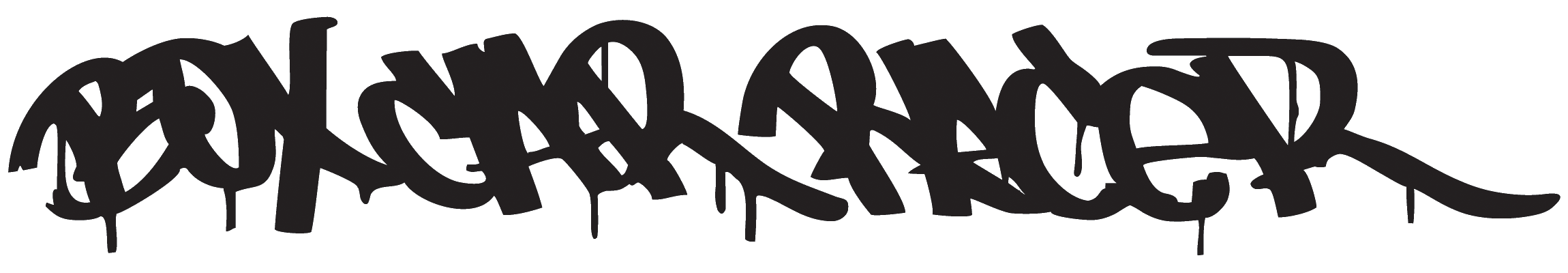

Box Car Racer was an American rock band formed in San Diego, California, in 2001. The band was a side-project of Blink-182 members Tom DeLonge and Travis Barker, with David Kennedy of Hazen Street completing the band's studio lineup. A friend of Barker, Anthony Celestino later joined the band as a bassist. DeLonge created the project to pursue darker ideas he felt unsuited to his work with Blink-182.

The group recorded the band's eponymous debut, Box Car Racer, in quick fashion with a more DIY spirit. MCA Records issued the band's lone release in May 2002, which peaked on the Billboard 200 at number 12. Singles "I Feel So" and "There Is" also charted on the Modern Rock Tracks chart, with the former peaking at number eight. The band embarked on their sole headlining tour across North America in the fall of 2002 with supporting act The Used. The project was largely the cause of ongoing tension between DeLonge and Blink-182 bandmate Mark Hoppus and influenced the band's following studio album, the more experimental Blink-182 (2003). DeLonge ended the project in mid-2003, considering it to have served its purpose; however, he described his later band, Angels & Airwaves (which also features Kennedy), as a continuation of Box Car Racer. Between 2018 and 2021, the project was rumored to have been revived by DeLonge and Barker, with talk of a new song recorded by the duo. That song, Barker confirmed in 2023, was eventually repurposed as the Blink-182 song "Terrified".

== History ==
=== Formation and origins ===
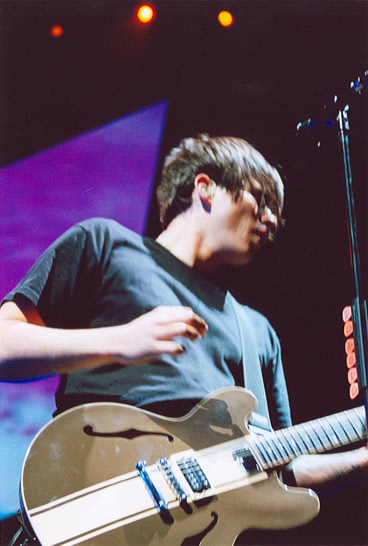
Tom DeLonge formed Box Car Racer largely due to delayed and canceled Blink-182 tour dates, the content of which was influenced by treatment of chronic back pain.

Box Car Racer was conceived by Blink-182 guitarist/vocalist Tom DeLonge and formed during a break from touring. A European tour for Blink-182 in winter 2001 was delayed in the aftermath of the September 11 attacks, and rescheduled dates in early 2002 were also canceled due to DeLonge's back problems. The roots for Box Car Racer began with DeLonge playing acoustic guitar during recording sessions for Blink-182's 2001 album Take Off Your Pants and Jacket and grew from there. Feeling "bummed out" in the studio during the recording of Take Off Your Pants and Jacket, DeLonge felt an "itch to do something where he didn't feel locked in to what Blink was." In a 2012 interview, DeLonge likened the creative state of Blink-182 to the art of painting, in which one has several different colors but, in the case of Blink-182's previous efforts, only employs one.

According to DeLonge, the project wasn't "meant to be a real band," but rather "something to do in some spare time that was really only expected to be on the low list of the totem pole of priorities in my life, and just to have an experimental creative outlet." The unnamed project went through other names, such as The Kill, and the record was initially titled Et tu, Brute?. He eventually settled on Box Car Racer, which was actually the name of a band Barker was in just after high school with schoolmates Alex Barreto and James Lopez, that DeLonge liked. Although Barker felt the name was meaningless, DeLonge related it to similarities between the Book of Revelation and World War II. While reading about the war, DeLonge was "freaked out" to learn that Fat Man, the atomic bomb that was detonated over Nagasaki, was dropped from the B-29 bomber Bockscar (commonly misspelled Boxcar). The record was originally conceived as a "Violent Femmes-esque acoustic record" that allowed DeLonge to explore his dark songwriting abilities away from Blink-182, but the project quickly became louder and more plugged in when Barker joined the project. To complete the project he invited fellow guitarist David Kennedy, whom DeLonge had met in the San Diego music circuit years prior.

Kennedy began in San Diego straight edge hardcore group Over My Dead Body, and had become good friends with DeLonge the summer prior to recording. The two had chatted about bands, gigs and the underground scene, which sparked off more interest from DeLonge in exploring his more traditionally hardcore punk leanings. "We had been hanging out a lot last summer or whatever ... it came about that we were talking about a type of music [with which] we were gonna experiment and do ... Blink had some openings [in their schedule] and he said if we were gonna do it, that we had to do it now," said Kennedy. "And that's really how things evolved in the band. Just hanging around really." Despite this, DeLonge was in control of the material "to an incredibly hands-on level," and the material recorded on the album was formulated over the fall and when the musicians entered the studio, very little would be changed aside from certain lyrics. The sessions were particularly difficult for DeLonge, who suffered chronic back pain, the result of a herniated disc. "When your back is killing you and you have to have surgery and all this stuff, it's just kind of hard to keep a focus on the happier times in your life," he said in an interview with MTV News. "You end up writing all these songs about feeling sad and confused."

=== Debut album ===
Box Car Racer was recorded over the course of six weeks beginning in December 2001, primarily at Signature Sound in San Diego, California. Rather than spend "months and months refining and polishing everything for a major label and international pop market," Box Car Racer followed a closer DIY spirit. Sessions for the album commenced quickly, with the "ever-resourceful" Jerry Finn having sent one whole load of equipment to Signature ahead of his arrival. Barker recorded his drums in one day at two separate recording facilities in Los Angeles prior to the Signature sessions. MCA representatives dropped in on the recording sessions and were pleased with what they heard. According to journalist Joe Shooman, while Box Car Racer was "essentially an outlet for DeLonge's more esoteric leanings, it very quickly became obvious that this was an album destined for release," largely due to Blink-182's explosive popularity at the time. "Any musical project with which any member was involved was very likely to fly off the shelves." "I don't think there was ever a doubt it was gonna be released — you have a project with two members of Blink-182 on it, it's pretty hard not to turn a profit on that," said engineer Sam Boukas. "I guess if the record company wasn't going to foot the bill, they were quite prepared to foot it themselves for Box Car Racer."

The creation of the Box Car Racer side project would cause great division in Blink-182, mostly between DeLonge and bassist Mark Hoppus. Hoppus was very interested in being a part of the project, but DeLonge did not want the record to turn into another Blink-182 album. DeLonge contended that the invitation of Barker was to refrain from having to pay a studio drummer. Regardless, Hoppus felt betrayed on the side project and it would become an unresolved tension that followed the band for the following few years. "At the end of 2001 it felt like Blink-182 had broken up. It wasn't spoken about, but it felt over," he said later. Despite tensions between the two, Hoppus lent vocals to the track "Elevator" and shared early ideas for the next Blink-182 album.

=== Touring ===
While DeLonge played bass on the group's debut album, a bassist went unannounced until the band made their live debut with bassist Anthony Celestino on April 1, 2002. They continued with a string of live shows in California until Blink-182 set out on tour with Green Day and Jimmy Eat World for the Pop Disaster Tour on April 17. DeLonge did not announce song titles at the band's debut performance at San Diego's Mira Mesa Epicentre, as they were unfinished ("Letters to God" was listed on the setlist as "Maybe I Don't"). In a review of the performance, MTV News writer Brian Wallace remarked that "For the most part, Kennedy and bassist Anthony Celestino were careful not to do anything — physically or musically — that would distract attention away from the band's pop-punk marquee players."

Box Car Racer was issued by MCA Records on May 21, 2002, and debuted at a "surprising" number 12 on the Billboard 200 the following week. The band regrouped later in the year for 22 headlining North American tour dates with supporting act The Used. While on the road, the group wrote and performed one new song, as well as a cover of Barry Manilow's "Mandy". In addition, Barker planned to remix several Box Car Racer songs for an EP and bolster the record with the two new tracks. The band played their final show in Detroit, Michigan on December 17, 2002, with DeLonge remarking that he would like to experiment more with Box Car Racer one day, "an every-other-year type thing."

=== Breakup and aftermath ===
I did it for myself, whether it sold a million copies or just one, it was for myself ... I wanted to challenge myself to do different shit, I honestly didn't realize how it would make Mark [Hoppus] feel.

— Tom DeLonge on the band's origin and later breakup

Despite this, DeLonge shelved the project in mid-2003, feeling it as a whole had run its course. "There are a lot of emotions between Mark and I and that's why there's never going to be another Box Car Racer album," he explained. The sound of Box Car Racer inspired the change in tone and experimental nature the band approached Blink-182 with. "Once the door was opened by Tom and Travis with Box Car Racer, Mark started to be more on board with that concept. He was also more flexible and the next Blink album was able to be a pretty big departure from the previous two," said assistant engineer Sam Boukas. "Box Car Racer opened the door in that sense and I think the three of them wanted to be more creative and have more creative liberty on that next album."

"It sucked," Hoppus said in 2003. "It really sucked. I took it very personally. It was really hard and a weird time for our band. When Tom and Travis started Box Car Racer I felt like the odd man out, the forgotten bassist." Tom Bryant of Kerrang!, who interviewed the duo shortly before the release of Blink-182 (2003), noted that "this is clearly an uncomfortable topic for the two of them. Though they say they have had hundreds of discussions about it, there's an awkward charge to the air as Hoppus explains his feelings ... While everything in the Blink-182 camp now seems rosy—it seems like these [apologies] still need to be reiterated." Unresolved tensions came to a head in late 2004 and Blink-182 broke up in February 2005.

In an interview with MTV News in September 2005, DeLonge spoke at length about the impact Box Car Racer had on the group as a whole:

It's obvious that the music changed after I went and did Box Car ... One of the craziest things about Box Car Racer is that it was the both greatest and the worst thing for Blink. It was obviously the reason why we made that last record, which I thought was a masterpiece, but it also caused a great division in the band. It was really hard for Mark. He thought it was really lame Travis and I went and did that, but it was a totally benign thing on my part, because I only asked Travis to play drums because I didn't want to pay for a studio drummer. It wasn't meant to be a real band.

Unfinished material from Box Car Racer eventually became part of DeLonge's next band, Angels & Airwaves, and their debut studio album, We Don't Need to Whisper (2006). Angels & Airwaves covered Box Car Racer's "There Is" at their very first live performance, and has performed various Box Car Racer songs live since. A sequel to a song found on Box Car Racer, "Letters to God, Part II" can be found on Angels & Airwaves' 2010 album Love.

=== Rumored revivals ===
In early 2017, DeLonge said in a tweet that he had a pleasant conversation with Barker. This stirred rumors that Box Car Racer was reuniting. The rumors grew when on May 8, 2017, DeLonge made a tweet asking fans who should guest feature on an album if one were to be made. However, no announcement has been made regarding a reunion since then. In 2018 DeLonge and Barker started to work on a new Box Car Racer song in secret. The recording process circulated between the years 2018 and 2021. In late 2020, Barker tweeted that 2021 will be the 20th anniversary of Box Car Racer, this tweet caused a reply from DeLonge who had a humorous response.

On April 30, 2021, Allison Hagendorf released the 23rd episode of her podcast "Rock This" featuring an interview with DeLonge during which he confirmed that he and Barker had recently recorded a song for Box Car Racer that had yet to be released, saying:

"I think Travis already let out of the bag that we do have a Box Car song laying around. We have not decided when to release it, but there is one. And we did it over the past, like, I think couple of years. But we just got to figure out, like, when that comes out, and how we do that. But we plan to."

In February 2023, Barker confirmed in a Twitter post that the song would "never" be released, only to announce a month later that it would be released on the forthcoming Blink-182 album instead. In an interview with Zane Lowe, Barker and DeLonge confirmed the song ultimately became the One More Time... track "Terrified." Blink-182 performed the first verse and chorus of "There Is" during their One More Time Tour in 2024.

== Musical style and influences ==
Box Car Racer was inspired by and is partly a tribute to bands DeLonge credits as an influence: Jawbox, Quicksand, Fugazi and Refused.

Critics primarily labeled Box Car Racer as pop punk, but with a few other genre categories being ascribed to the band. PopMatters describing the band as "hardcore/emo/punk rock" while also describing the band as pop punk. USA Today labeled the band as post-punk and power pop.

== Band members ==
- Tom DeLonge – vocals, guitars (2001–2003), bass (2001–2002)
- Travis Barker – drums (2001–2003)
- David Kennedy – guitars (2001–2003)
- Anthony Celestino – bass (2002–2003)

== Discography ==
=== Studio albums ===
Year	Title	Peak chart positions						Certifications
Year	Title	US	AUS	CAN	GER	IRL	UK	Certifications
2002	Box Car Racer: Released: May 21, 2002; Label: MCA (112894); Formats: CD, vinyl, cassette tape	12	30	7	89	49	27	CAN: Gold; UK: Silver

=== Singles ===
Year	Title	Peak chart positions			Album
Year	Title	US	US Alt.	UK	Album
2002	"I Feel So"	—^{[A]}	8	41	Box Car Racer
2002	"There Is"	—	32	—	Box Car Racer
"—" denotes a release that did not chart.

Notes

- A. "I Feel So" peaked outside of the US Billboard Hot 100 chart, therefore it is listed on the Bubbling Under Hot 100 chart.

== Videography ==
=== DVD ===
Year	Title	Label
2002	Box Car Racer	MCA Records

=== Music videos ===
Year	Title	Director
2002	"I Feel So"	Nathan Cox, Tom DeLonge
2002	"There Is"	Alexander Kosta
