= Purple Reign in Blood =

Live album by Fenix TX
- Released: November 8, 2005
- Recorded: August 19, 2005 at The Clubhouse (Tempe, Arizona)
- Genre: Pop punk, skate punk, melodic hardcore
- Length: 51:06
- Label: Adrenaline, New Planet

Fenix TX chronology
| Lechuza (2001) | Purple Reign in Blood (2005) | CRE.EP (2016) |

Professional ratings
Review scores
| Source | Rating |
|---|---|
| AllMusic | 2.5/5 stars |

Purple Reign in Blood is the third album released by the pop punk band Fenix TX. The album is a live recording and it marks their first performance together in almost four years.

== Release ==
"Katie W." and "Phoebe Cates" were made available for streaming on November 2, 2005. On the same day, it was announced that Prince was going to sue the band in regards to the album artwork. The album was released on November 8 through Adrenaline. From November 18 onwards, the version with the original artwork was replaced with a version with altered artwork.

The show's encore was cut from the CD, which is evident as the end of the CD fades out while the crowd chants the phrase "One more song!".

== Track listing ==
1. "Something Bad Is Gonna Happen" – 3:56
2. "Phoebe Cates" – 4:09
3. "Katie W." – 3:59
4. "Minimum Wage" – 3:05
5. "Tearjerker" – 3:50
6. "Pasture of Muppets" – 4:05
7. "Fortunate Son" – 2:29
8. "Threesome" – 4:02
9. "Abba Zabba" – 4:47
10. "A Song for Everyone" – 4:13
11. "Flight 601" – 4:15
12. "Major Tom" – 3:54
13. "All My Fault" – 4:33

Six songs were cut from the recording to make the album. These songs include the entire encore, which consisted of a cover song, an original song and ended with "Rooster Song". Two other cover songs and a song from the Fenix TX album also failed to make the album.

== Personnel ==
- Damon DeLaPaz – drums
- Adam Lewis – bass
- Chris Lewis – guitar
- Will Salazar – vocals, guitar
