= G.B.O.H. =

EP by Riverfenix
- Released: 1996
- Recorded: Deep Dot Studios (Houston, Texas)
- Genre: Pop punk, skate punk, ska-punk
- Length: 17:12
- Label: Fuzzgun
- Producer: Redo Makeshift, Riverfenix

Riverfenix chronology
G.B.O.H. (1996)	Riverfenix (1997)

Professional ratings
Review scores
Source	Rating
Allmusic	3/5 stars

G.B.O.H. (Gangster Bitches on Heroin) is the debut EP by Riverfenix, released in 1996 on Fuzzgun Records. It has been out of print for some time.

== Track listing ==
(all songs written by Riverfenix, now known as Fenix TX)

1. "Minimum Wage" – 2:18
2. "Telefornication" – 2:25
3. "G.B.O.H." – 3:23
4. "Philosophy" – 2:24
5. "O'Bleek" – 3:31
6. "Skinhead Jessie" – 3:09

== Personnel ==
- Damon DeLaPaz (credited as M.C. Treefrog) – guitar, vocals
- Adam Lewis (credited as Brother Quaddell Hicks) – bass
- Donnie Reyes (credited as El Gordo) – drums, vocals
- Will Salazar (credited as Chato Smooth) – guitar, vocals
