= Riverfenix (album) =

Studio album by Riverfenix
- Released: December 16, 1997
- Genre: Pop punk, skate punk
- Length: 47:43
- Label: Drive-Thru
- Producer: Jim Barnes

Riverfenix chronology
G.B.O.H. (1996)	Riverfenix (1997)	Fenix TX (1999)

Singles from Riverfenix
- 1. "All My Fault" Released: 2000

Professional ratings
Review scores
Source	Rating
AllMusic	3/5 stars

Riverfenix is the first full-length album by Riverfenix, released on December 16, 1997 on Drive-Thru Records. Most of the album's songs were re-recorded for Fenix TX (released by both Drive-Thru and major label MCA Records), when Riverfenix was forced to change their name. This album has since been out of print and is a treasured collector's item among fans as "Skinhead Jessie", "Jaw" and the untitled tracks are not featured on the Fenix TX version release. "Apple Pie Cowboy Toothpaste" and "Jolly Green Dumbass" also featured short intros while "Rooster Song" had a slightly different sound and featured a small message within the silence leading into the second untitled track.

== Track listing ==
(all songs written by Riverfenix)

1. "Apple Pie Cowboy Toothpaste" – 4:58
2. "G.B.O.H." – 3:18
3. "Minimum Wage" – 1:57
4. "All My Fault" – 2:51
5. "Jolly Green Dumbass" – 3:06
6. "Skinhead Jessie" – 2:50
7. "Ben" – 3:17
8. "Speechless" – 4:10
9. "Jean Claude Trans Am" – 2:27
10. Untitled intro to "Philosophy" – 0:33
11. "Philosophy" – 2:10
12. "Jaw" – 3:48
13. "No Lie" – 2:41
14. "Rooster Song" – 4:04
15. "City of the Dead" hidden track – 4:55
16. Untitled outro – 0:31

== Personnel ==
Riverfenix

- Will Salazar (credited as The Silky Smooth Ninja) – guitar, vocals
- Damon DeLaPaz (credited as M.C. Treefrog) – guitar, vocals
- Adam Lewis (credited as Brother Quaddel Hicks) – bass guitar
- Donnie Reyes (credited as Tofu) – drums

Additional personnel

- Louis Castle – trumpet
- Danny Rukasin – trombone
- Ro Sahebi – additional guitar
- Rich Zahniser – trombone
