= Lechuza (album) =

Studio album by Fenix TX
- Released: May 22, 2001
- Studio: Ocean (Burbank, California), Entourage (North Hollywood, California), Track Record (North Hollywood, California), Village Recorders (Los Angeles, California)
- Genre: Pop punk; melodic hardcore
- Length: 52:02 (39:55 without silence and hidden track)
- Label: MCA; Drive-Thru
- Producer: Jerry Finn

Fenix TX chronology
Fenix TX (1999)	Lechuza (2001)	Purple Reign in Blood (2005)

Singles from Lechuza
- 1. "Threesome" Released: June 11, 2001; 2. "Katie W." Released: 2002

Lechuza (Spanish "barn owl") is the second studio album by American pop punk band Fenix TX, released on May 22, 2001, by MCA and Drive-Thru Records. Between June and August, the group performed on the Warped Tour.

The first song, "Phoebe Cates", is a first-person tale of falling in lust with actress Phoebe Cates. It includes a bridge with the lines "Looking for a fast time / Watching out for bright lights / Send me off to private school / When I'm with you it's paradise", all of which are references to films starring Cates (Fast Times at Ridgemont High, Bright Lights, Big City, Private School and Paradise, respectively).

On both the UK and the Japanese issue of the album, two bonus tracks are added — an updated rendition the Spanish Christmas song "Feliz Navidad" and the group's 2000 single "All My Fault" from Fenix TX. The hidden track "James' Song" is placed at the end of the second bonus track, thus shortening the length of track 11 on these issues to 5:34.

This is the final studio album with Adam Lewis on bass, before his death in June 2024.

== Reception ==
Professional ratings
Review scores
Source	Rating
AllMusic	link
Melodic	2/5 stars
Ox-Fanzine	Favorable

The album was included at number 33 on Rock Sound's "The 51 Most Essential Pop Punk Albums of All Time" list. The album has sold 600,000 copies to date.

== Track listing ==
All tracks written by Fenix TX.

1. "Phoebe Cates" – 3:40
2. "Katie W." – 3:34
3. "Threesome" – 2:33
4. "Something Bad Is Gonna Happen" – 3:34
5. "Tearjerker" – 3:44
6. "Pasture of Muppets" – 3:00
7. "A Song for Everyone" – 4:08
8. "Manufactured Inspirato" – 2:51
9. "Beating a Dead Horse" – 3:16
10. "Abba Zabba" – 4:01
11. "El Borracho" – 17:36
  - Hidden track "James' Song" appears 13 minutes and 47 seconds into the last track.

Bonus tracks

12. "Feliz Navidad" – 3:02
13. "All My Fault" – 14:56

== Personnel ==
Fenix TX

- William Salazar – lead vocals, guitar
- Damon DeLaPaz – drums, guitar, background vocals
- Adam Lewis – bass, background vocals
- James Love – guitar

Additional personnel

- Roddy Bottum – keyboards
- Dennis Hill – additional guitar, background vocals
