= Fenix TX (album) =

Studio album by Fenix TX
- Released: July 13, 1999
- Studio: Desert Moon (Anaheim, California), Royaltone (Burbank, California)
- Genre: Pop punk; skate punk
- Length: 39:50
- Label: MCA; Drive-Thru
- Producer: Ryan Greene; Jim Barnes; Jerry Finn (add.)

Fenix TX chronology
Riverfenix (1997)	Fenix TX (1999)	Lechuza (2001)

Singles from Fenix TX
- 1. "All My Fault" Released: 1999

Professional ratings
Review scores
Source	Rating
AllMusic	3/5 stars
Ox-Fanzine	Favorable
Kerrang!	2/5 stars

Fenix TX (typeset as Fēnix★TX) is the second studio album by Fenix TX, released on July 13, 1999, by MCA and Drive-Thru Records. It is the first album with their updated name.

Most of the Riverfenix album was re-recorded for Fenix TX. "Skinhead Jessie", "Jaw" and the untitled tracks from Riverfenix weren't included on this album, instead they were replaced by the previously unreleased "Flight 601 (All I've Got Is Time)" and "Surf Song". The track listing had also been rearranged.

Cleveland.com ranked "All My Fault" at number 91 on their list of the top 100 pop-punk songs.

== Track listing ==
All songs written by Fenix TX.

1. "Flight 601 (All I've Got Is Time)" – 3:28
2. "Minimum Wage" – 2:02
3. "Surf Song" – 2:37
4. "All My Fault" – 2:49
5. "Jolly Green Dumbass" – 2:51
6. "G.B.O.H." – 3:25
7. "Ben" – 3:27
8. "Speechless" – 4:13
9. "Philosophy" – 2:18
10. "No Lie" – 2:38
11. "Apple Pie Cowboy Toothpaste" – 4:50
12. "Jean Claude Trans Am" – 2:37
13. "Rooster Song" – 2:30

== Personnel ==
Fenix TX

- Will Salazar (credited as Will Powers) – guitar, lead vocals
- Damon DeLaPaz (credited as Dumpster Damon) – guitar, background vocals
- Adam Lewis (credited as Adam Atomic) – bass
- Donnie Reyes (credited as Donnie Vomit) – drums

Production

- Ryan Greene – producer (1, 3), mixing (1, 3, 9, 12, 13)
- Jim Barnes – producer (2, 4-13)
- Jerry Finn – additional production and mixing (2, 4-7)
- Rich Mouser – mixing (8)
