= Box Car Racer (album) =

Studio album by Box Car Racer
- Released: May 21, 2002
- Recorded: September – November 2001
- Studios: Signature Sound, San Diego, California; Larrabee West, Hollywood, California; O'Henry Sound, Burbank, California
- Genres: Post-hardcore; emo; punk rock; pop-punk; post-punk; power pop
- Length: 41:30
- Label: MCA
- Producer: Jerry Finn

Singles from Box Car Racer
- 1. "I Feel So" Released: June 6, 2002; 2. "There Is" Released: August 19, 2002

Box Car Racer is the only studio album by American rock band Box Car Racer. Produced by Jerry Finn, the album was released on May 21, 2002, through MCA Records. The band was a side-project of Blink-182 members Tom DeLonge and Travis Barker, with David Kennedy completing the band's studio lineup. A bassist and friend of Barker, Anthony Celestino, later joined as the band's bassist after DeLonge recorded the bass tracks for the record.

The record is primarily based on DeLonge's post-hardcore influences, such as Fugazi and Refused. The recording sessions were particularly difficult for him, as he had recently undergone back surgery. The record is a concept album detailing the end of the world, and features dark, moody tracks mulling over confusion. Blink-182 bassist Mark Hoppus—the only member of that band not involved in the project—felt betrayed over his lack of inclusion, which evolved into tensions between him and DeLonge, ultimately contributing to the band's 2005 breakup. Despite this, Hoppus provided guest vocals on the album's twelfth track "Elevator".

Box Car Racer peaked at number twelve on the US Billboard 200 despite little promotion, and the two singles "I Feel So" and "There Is" charted on Billboard's Modern Rock Tracks chart, with the former hitting the top 10. The album received positive reviews from music critics, who complimented the darker direction in comparison to DeLonge's previous work with Blink. The group toured the album in North America in late 2002 with the Used and H_{2}O, and subsequently dissolved in 2003.

== Background ==
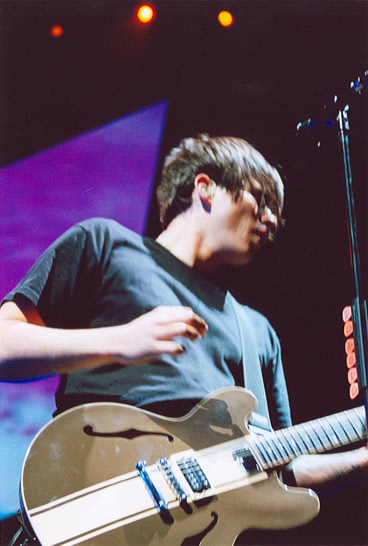
Tom DeLonge conceived the project during a break from touring.

Box Car Racer was conceived by Blink-182 guitarist/vocalist Tom DeLonge and formed during a break from touring. DeLonge, who came to prominence as guitarist of Blink-182, began his career within the band's fast-paced, irreverent pop-punk style, and was singularly focused on punk rock and emo, rejecting other styles as part of the punk identity. When drummer Travis Barker joined Blink-182 in 1998, his broader musical background—including metal (he had learned Master of Puppets start to finish as a teenager) and hip-hop—introduced new stylistic possibilities. Barker encouraged DeLonge to explore heavier and more experimental music, leading him toward post-hardcore acts such as Fugazi, Quicksand, Rocket from the Crypt, and Pitchfork. Reflecting on this period in 2001, DeLonge told Alternative Press, "You grow up and realize, 'There are so many great forms of music out there,'" noting that his tastes were expanding beyond the constraints of traditional punk.

"His reasons for starting the band were in part spawned from the dark thoughts he was immersed in post–September 11, the side-effects of the painkillers protecting him from the searing pain of his back problems and a dissatisfaction with the lyrical and musical territory he felt he could with Blink-182."

— Kerrang! writer Tom Bryant

This stylistic shift coincided with the band’s heightened commercial visibility in the early 2000s, as Blink-182 became a multi-platinum arena act. The pressures of fame shaped each member differently: DeLonge sought greater privacy, married in 2001, and he felt a growing urge to explore material that would not leave him constrained by what Blink-182 had become. He also expressed frustration with major label expectations and with not being taken seriously within the broader punk community. Physical strain added to this transitional period: DeLonge suffered a herniated disc that required surgery in 2001, and the resulting painkiller regimen caused what he later described as "neurosis-inducing side effects." Ultimately, Blink-182's European tour in late 2001 was postponed in the aftermath of the September 11 attacks, and rescheduled dates in early 2002 were canceled due to DeLonge's ongoing back problems. During the resulting hiatus, DeLonge told friends he intended to step away from music entirely. But while jamming with Barker on tour, he began developing heavier-sounding guitar riffs; the first riff he created became part of the song "All Systems Go".

Throughout this period, DeLonge reconnected with guitarist David Kennedy, a fellow San Diego musician who had played in straight-edge bands like Over My Dead Body. Having known each other for several years, they began spending more time together in 2001. Their conversations drifted to the heavier guitar style he had been writing, and the idea of fleshing them out into a new project took shape. It was at first solely acoustic guitar-based; he considered it in its earliest stages to be a "Violent Femmes-esque acoustic record". The unnamed project went through other names, such as The Kill, and the album was initially titled Et tu, Brute?. He eventually settled on the name Box Car Racer, which was actually the name of a band Barker was in just after high school that DeLonge liked. He began writing songs about the end of the world, and connected it thematically with the biblical Book of Revelation and World War II. When reading about the war, DeLonge was "freaked out" to learn that Fat Man, the atomic bomb that was detonated over Nagasaki, was dropped from the B-29 bomber Bockscar (commonly misspelled Boxcar).

== Recording and production ==
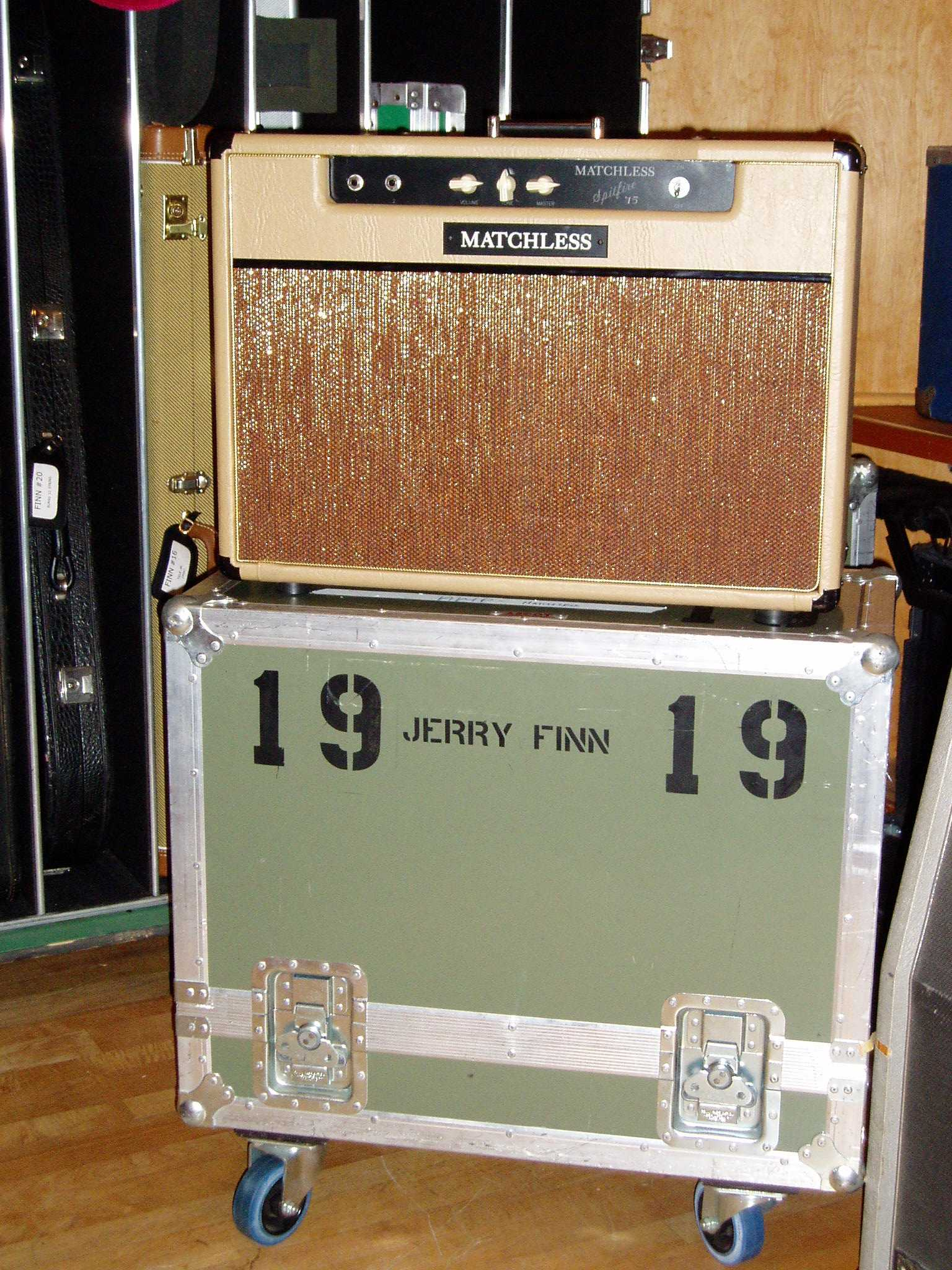
Producer Jerry Finn's gear. According to assistant engineer Sam Boukas, his equipment took up "half the studio space."

Box Car Racer was recorded over six weeks beginning in December 2001, primarily at Signature Sound in San Diego, California. Sessions commenced quickly, with producer Jerry Finn having sent one whole load of equipment to Signature ahead of his arrival. Travis Barker said he used five different drum kits while recording Box Car Racer, calling it "totally different" from blink-182 and describing the album as more dynamic than his previous work. He added that he wanted each song to have its own distinct sound rather than simply recording with a single kit throughout the sessions. Barker and DeLonge worked out "80 percent" of the completed album in Barker's warehouse in Corona, California, two weeks prior to recording. When the musicians entered the studio, little was changed aside from certain lyrics, according to assistant engineer Sam Boukas. Barker completed his drum tracks in one day at two recording facilities in Los Angeles prior to the Signature sessions, with all parts recorded in the first take. DeLonge invited musician David Kennedy, whom he had met in the San Diego music circuit some years prior, to perform lead guitar parts on the album. Roger Joseph Manning Jr. plays keyboards on the record.

The sessions were particularly difficult for DeLonge, who suffered chronic back pain. "When your back is killing you and you have to have surgery and all this stuff, it's just kind of hard to keep a focus on the happier times in your life," he told MTV News. "You end up writing all these songs about feeling sad and confused." He often could only stand and sing for five minutes at a time before having to lay down again. Journalist Joe Shooman writes that the album followed a DIY spirit, rather than spending "months and months refining and polishing everything for a major label and international pop market." According to Boukas, an MCA representative dropped in on the sessions and was pleased with what he heard.

== Composition and artwork ==
"All Systems Go"
"All Systems Go" was the first song written for the album; in writing it, DeLonge was inspired by the band Quicksand.

Box Car Racer was inspired by and is partly a tribute to bands DeLonge credited as an influence, such as Quicksand, Fugazi, and Refused. Musically, it is not drastically different than Blink-182, though it puts more emphasis on "slower, heavier rhythms" instead of being fast-paced. Critics primarily labeled the album as pop punk, but with a few other genre categories being ascribed to the album. PopMatters described the album as a "hardcore/emo/punk rock album" while also describing it as a pop punk album. USA Today labeled the album as power pop. The subject matter found on Box Car Racer explores the apocalypse, conspiracy theories, and Freemasonry. The album follows a central storyline, regarding an unnamed boy during the end of the world.

Barker and DeLonge wrote the songs together. DeLonge would decide what key he would sing the song in, and Barker would mostly arrange the song, toying with its structure and tempo/time signature. As for his performance on the album, Barker considered it a "totally different approach to the drums ... there are, like, jazzy bridges. ... It's so much more open and roomy." The album's final song, "Instrumental", was removed on the cassette edition of the album and replaced with an instrumental version of "I Feel So". The album's artwork, described by Shooman, consists of "bleak burgundy brown and black silhouettes plus a graffiti-esque band logo." The hidden message "LNW 13 01 1" is printed on the CD insert, which are coordinates pointing to Manhattan, New York. Art direction for the album was headed by Tim Stedman, with Stedman and Marcos Orozco designing the package. Keegan Gibbs was responsible for the "Box Car Racer" logo, while Maxx Gramajo created the tag logo artwork. Scott Heisel of Punknews.org considered the album similar to Blink-182, describing it as "Blink 182 in drop D tuning".

== Controversy ==
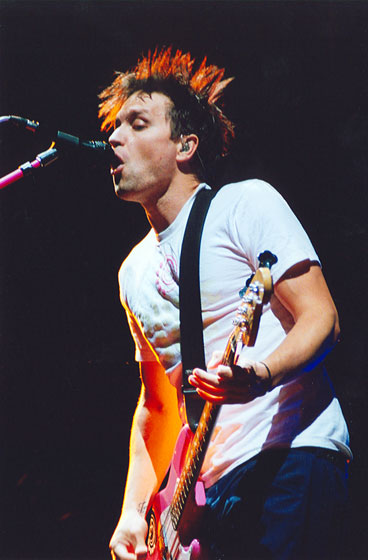
Mark Hoppus, Blink-182’s bassist and vocalist, was omitted from the project, a highly visible exclusion that fueled long-term friction.

Box Car Racer was notable in that it brought together two-thirds of Blink-182, effectively excluding bassist Mark Hoppus. The secrecy surrounding the project deepened an emerging personal rift within the band. Though the trio were outwardly buoyant, retaining their trademark brand of humor onstage, a quiet distance had begun to develop between DeLonge and Hoppus, intensified by exhaustion, competition, and the pressures of fame. Before the band took a break from touring, DeLonge had told Hoppus that he was looking forward to time away from music. Hoppus was therefore surprised to learn through mutual friends that DeLonge was working on new material. The two had long been creative partners, making the silence particularly unusual. DeLonge eventually called Hoppus to describe the project as a small acoustic collaboration with David Kennedy, and although he remained wary, Hoppus reluctantly accepted the proposal.

The project quickly "snowballed" beyond its original intent, evolving from casual studio sessions into a fully formed band, according to DeLonge. He explained that his primary goal was to freely experiment in the studio and that he had not anticipated the scale the project would ultimately reach. Although the work had originated from their shared jams, DeLonge claimed that Barker was brought in primarily to avoid hiring a session musician. Barker, in turn, assumed Hoppus had already been informed, viewing the two as inseparable. The scope of the project further expanded when an A&R representative from MCA Records heard four unfinished songs and offered to finance the album, despite DeLonge's original intent to self-fund. "They were like, 'Oh my god. What is this?! You might have done the most incredible re-branding and marketing thing ever done in music!'" DeLonge recalled. The project quickly drew in various members of Blink-182's support network, including their manager, producer, booking agency, legal team, and others. "When we wrote this album, we didn't know if it was going to be on a label or if we were going to put it out ourselves," Barker said at the time. "Once MCA jumped on board, it was kind of like, "Whatever! That's cool. Cheers! Put it out, we don't really care!"

"Things had quickly evolved from Tom saying he wanted to play acoustic guitar with his friend to creating a full-blown band called Box Car Racer featuring Tom DeLonge and Travis Barker, with our manager handling them and our label releasing their music, with shows booked by our agency and represented by our attorneys. It was Blink-182, minus Mark Hoppus. I was heartbroken."

— Mark Hoppus

As he became aware of the project's expanding scope and direction, Hoppus perceived it as deliberately deceitful and grew increasingly upset. In private, DeLonge tried to reassure Hoppus that the project had merely grown beyond his intentions, and that it was not meant to "alienate" him, but it nonetheless stood in direct tension with their primary band. Barker felt guilty when he told Hoppus they were going to tour in support of the album: "I felt like I had let him down [...] but he was ultimately more upset at Tom because they had ten years of history together before me." The wider music industry quickly noticed what appeared to be a deliberate slight toward Hoppus, prompting speculation and questions about the band's relationships. Public appearances and media attention only heightened the tensions. In January 2002, Blink-182 appeared on TRL to promote a major upcoming tour with Green Day, and Hoppus appeared visibly uncomfortable when questions about Box Car Racer arose. Similarly, during a KROQ radio interview, a host asked the two, 'So what's the deal, Tom? Is Mark not cool enough to be in your new band?'"

As a gesture of reconciliation, DeLonge invited Hoppus to sing on the song "Elevator". Hoppus initially reacted with outrage but ultimately agreed, partly to avoid being publicly portrayed as an outsider. Despite this compromise, the entire episode shaped their internal dynamics for years to come, contributing to long-term friction. It was cited as a factor in the band's 2005 breakup: in that similar turn of events, DeLonge requested time off from the band for space, but was privately tempted with a solo deal with the band's label. That arrangement eventually led to his next project, Angels & Airwaves, which included Kennedy and was described by DeLonge as a continuation of the creative direction initiated with Box Car Racer. Over time, Blink-182 members attempted to reconcile the rift: the band incorporated a Box Car Racer song into a medley on their 2024 tour. Hoppus has referred to the album as a "good album," but acknowledged that the dynamic and creative chemistry within Blink-182 was permanently altered from the experience.

== Critical reception ==
Professional ratings
Review scores
Source	Rating
AllMusic	3/5 stars
Argus Leader	(positive)
PopMatters	(positive)
Q	(positive)
Slant Magazine	3.5/5 stars
USA Today	3/4 stars
Punknews.org	1.5/5 stars

Aaron Scott of Slant was favorable in his review of Box Car Racer, writing, "Neither genre-obsessed nor intent on defying convention, Box Car Racer is the perfect union between pop-punk riffs and instrumentation that spans all rock genres from indie to folk. Finally, we have a pop band that is attempting to take advantage of the potential of its instruments." Adam Dlugacz of PopMatters summarized Box Car Racer as "pretty fantastic hardcore/emo/punk rock album. It seems to re-affirm the band's roots while proving that they are capable of more than the by-the-numbers approach of Blink. On the other hand, there's no reason this couldn't have been a Blink-182 album." Robert Morast from Argus Leader felt the same, commenting, "The music is good with brooding melodies that fester inside the soul. But for DeLonge, it just sounds like he's lost searching for his other half."

Edna Gunderson of USA Today was positive, commenting, "The music, while upbeat and even giddy, steers away from adolescent pranks and pratfalls, a welcome upgrade. The band creates a fresh breed of post-punk power pop by roughing up bright melodies." AllMusic's Brian O'Neill gave the album three stars, calling it a "far cry from the party-boy ethos DeLonge is best known for, and he wears the emotional depth well, with songs that are just as hooky as from his bread-winning main squeeze." A reviewer for Q admitted that the musicians "confound expectations with a very good record." The positive reception of the album was in contrast to the reviews for Blink, which were often negative. "I think it's a cop-out for [critics] to like the music I do," DeLonge told the Arizona Daily Star. "Critics can't say they like Blink or give us any credit, 'cause we're out there goofing around." Barker was more critical: "I especially don't care what the critics say. Most of them are like 50 years old and they're not really educated in what kind of music we're playing to begin with!" Scott Heisel of Punknews.org denounced the album as "completely and utterly forgettable".

== Commercial performance ==
Box Car Racer was released worldwide on May 21, 2002, by MCA Records. The album debuted on the Billboard 200 at number 12 on May 30, 2002, selling 65,000 copies in its first week. The numbers were considered surprising given that the album had virtually no promotion. "The overall response to this album has been ridiculous. We didn't have much push or anything, we didn't do a whole lot of promo before the album came out and it still did really well," said Barker. As of August 2002, it had sold 244,000 copies in the U.S., according to Nielsen SoundScan. Internationally, the album charted best in Canada, where it peaked at number seven. In 2006, the album was certified gold in Canada for shipments of 50,000 copies.

"I Feel So" was the album's first single. The music video for the song, which is mainly performance-based, was co-directed by DeLonge and Nathan "Karma" Cox. The song was the band's highest-charting single, peaking at number eight on Billboard's Modern Rock Tracks chart in June 2002. "There Is" was issued as the album's second and final single, and peaked at number 32 on the same chart in November 2002. The music video for that song was inspired by the film Say Anything... (1989), and was directed by Alexander Kosta. Both videos, as well as bonus footage, were included on a self-titled DVD, which was released November 2002.

== Touring ==
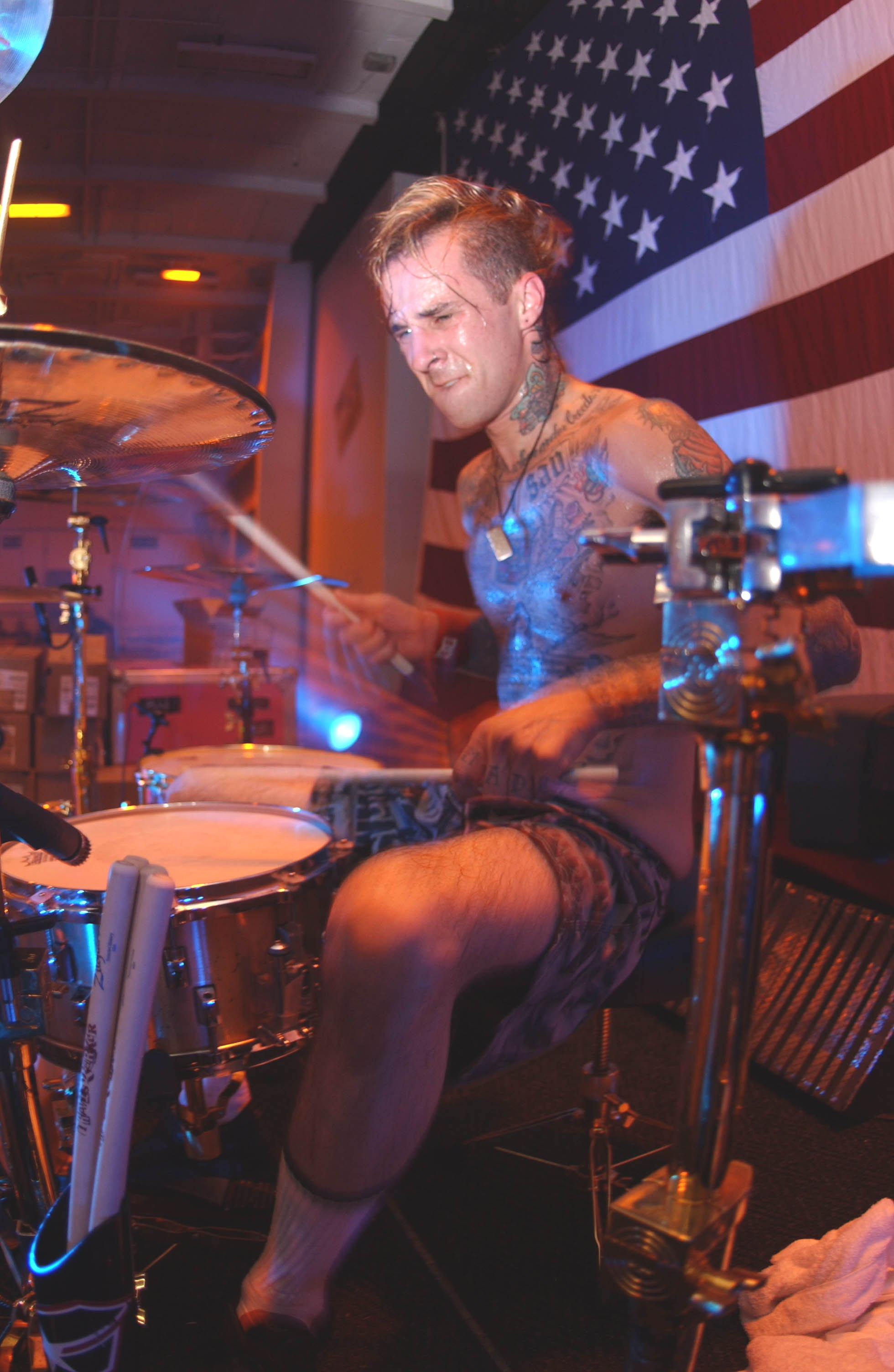
Drummer Travis Barker, whose interest in post-hardcore music helped develop the album.

To support the album, the project morphed into a full band, with Barker, DeLonge, and Kennedy. Barker invited his friend Anthony Celestino to play bass. He had initially wanted Alex Barreto, who was in the original Box Car Racer, to be a part of the "second version" of the band, but he could not get in touch with him. They played their first four shows in April 2002. The group commenced a full-scale tour behind the album in October 2002, with 22 North American shows supported by the Used and H_{2}O.

Barker described the tour as a welcome return to small clubs after blink-182's arena success, saying he missed the intimacy of playing close to fans. He contrasted the experience with blink-182's "big venues," which he felt had become impersonal, and said he enjoyed the opportunity to form a new band on the road and perform in smaller rooms. Though DeLonge would joke around at shows, as he was known for doing with Blink-182, the overall mood was much different. "With Blink, I can't wait until I get done playing a song so I can say something stupid. With this band I hardly talk at all," he told Las Vegas Weekly. He expounded upon this in another interview: "It's a much more powerful, emotional experience than it is with Blink. To play songs and have them showcased to where it represents what this kind of music is all about is a welcome experience. It's not about anything but the music itself."

== Aftermath ==
Although Box Car Racer dissolved by 2003 amid the interpersonal discomfort it had caused within Blink-182, the album has maintained a lasting popularity among fans. In a 2003 interview with Kerrang!, DeLonge claimed the album was only an attempt to "challenge myself to do different shit": "I did it for myself, whether it sold a million copies or just one, it was for myself." The article's author, Tom Bryant, describes the album's effect on subsequent Blink-182 albums: "It allowed [DeLonge], and therefore the band, to assess whether, approaching or in their 30s, they still really wanted to be writing songs about splitting up from teenage sweethearts or whether it was time to address something a little more serious and a little more important." DeLonge subsequently formed Angels & Airwaves, recruiting David Kennedy and continuing the collaborative approach initiated during Box Car Racer. Looking back, DeLonge remains proud of the record, describing it in 2017 as "a mainstream version of the post-hardcore and punk rock influences" in his life.

Mark Hoppus has remained largely diplomatic in reflecting on the album, describing it as "a good record that nearly brought down our band," though he acknowledges that it remains a sensitive point in Blink-182's history. For their part, both DeLonge and Barker have repeatedly expressed interest in reuniting the band. A continued collaboration between the two later produced the song "Terrified", which was repurposed for Blink-182's 2023 album One More Time. In later interviews, drummer Travis Barker noted that Box Car Racer developed a reputation as a "drummer's drummer" record due to its loose, improvisatory drum parts. Speaking to Modern Drummer, he noted "Drummers everywhere seemed to love it, and I'm flattered."

== Track listing ==
All tracks are written by Tom DeLonge and Travis Barker, and arranged by Box Car Racer.

Box Car Racer
No.	Title	Length
1.	"I Feel So"	4:30
2.	"All Systems Go"	3:15
3.	"Watch the World"	3:52
4.	"Tiny Voices"	3:27
5.	"Cat Like Thief" (featuring Tim Armstrong of Rancid and Jordan Pundik of New Found Glory)	4:20
6.	"And I"	3:11
7.	"Letters to God"	3:16
8.	"My First Punk Song"	1:04
9.	"Sorrow"	3:26
10.	"There Is"	3:16
11.	"The End with You"	3:11
12.	"Elevator" (featuring Mark Hoppus of Blink-182)	2:45
13.	"Instrumental"	1:57
Total length:		41:30

Notes

- An instrumental version of "I Feel So" is present on the cassette edition of the album, replacing track 13, "Instrumental".

== Personnel ==
Information adapted from CD liner notes.

Box Car Racer

- Thomas DeLonge – vocals, guitars, bass guitar
- David Kennedy – guitars
- Travis Barker – drums, percussion

Production

- Jerry Finn – producer
- Rich Costey – mixing
- Joe McGrath – engineering
- Brian Gardner – mastering
- Darren Mora – assistant engineer
- Jeff Moses – assistant engineer
- Sam Boukas – assistant engineer
- Mike Fasano – drum technician

Management

- Rick DeVoe – management
- Gary Ashley – A&R

Artwork

- Tim Stedman – art direction, illustration, photography
- Marcos Orozco – illustration, photography
- Maxx Gramajo – tag logo artwork
- Keegan Gibbs – "Box Car Racer" logo

Additional musicians

- Roger Joseph Manning Jr. – keyboards
- Mark Hoppus – featured vocals on "Elevator"
- Tim Armstrong – featured vocals on "Cat Like Thief"
- Jordan Pundik – backing vocals on "Cat Like Thief"

== Charts ==
=== Weekly charts ===
Weekly chart performance for Box Car Racer
Chart (2002)	Peak position
Australian Albums (ARIA)	30
Canadian Albums (Billboard)	7
German Albums (Offizielle Top 100)	89
Irish Albums (IRMA)	49
Scottish Albums (Official Charts)	25
UK Albums (Official Charts)	27
UK Rock & Metal Albums (Official Charts)	3
US Billboard 200	12

=== Year-end charts ===
Year-end chart performance for Box Car Racer
Chart (2002)	Position
Canadian Albums (Nielsen SoundScan)	177
Canadian Alternative Albums (Nielsen SoundScan)	57

== Certifications ==
Certifications for Box Car Racer
Region	Certification	Certified units/sales
Canada (Music Canada)	Gold	50,000^{^}
United Kingdom (BPI)	Silver	60,000^{^}
^{^} Shipments figures based on certification alone.
