= Fenix TX =

American pop punk band

- Also known as: Riverfenix (1995–1998)
- Origin: Houston, Texas, U.S.
- Genres: Pop punk; skate punk; punk rock
- Years active: 1995–2002; 2005–2006; 2009–present
- Labels: Drive-Thru; MCA; People of Punk Rock
- Members: Arturo Barrios; Damon DeLaPaz; Chris Lewis; Donnie Reyes; Jay Sanchioli
- Past members: Will Salazar; Carl Lockstedt; James Love; Adam Lewis; Ilan Rubin; Aaron Thompson; Trevor Faris; Scott McLaughlin
- Website: fenixtxofficial.com

Fenix TX (styled as Fenix*TX) is an American pop punk band. The band originally formed as Riverfenix in 1995 in Houston, Texas. Under that name, they independently released an EP, G.B.O.H., and an album, Riverfenix, before having to change their name due to a cease and desist order from the estate of actor River Phoenix. Following the change of name, they signed with major label MCA Records in 1999. On MCA, they released two further albums, 1999's Fenix TX and 2001's Lechuza, which collectively sold over 600,000 units. The band broke up in 2002 over creative differences.

After the split, bassist Adam Lewis and drummer Damon DeLaPaz devoted themselves to their now defunct side project Sing the Body Electric, while vocalist/guitarist Will Salazar and guitarist Chris Lewis formed the band Denver Harbor. Donnie Reyes went on to join Khobretti.

In September 2005, Fenix TX announced their reunion. They released a live album, Purple Reign in Blood, and supported it with tours across the United States and Japan.

== History ==
=== Early years (1995–1997) ===
The band that would ultimately become Fenix TX was formed in late 1995 in Houston, Texas under the name Riverfenix by guitarists Damon DeLaPaz (also the drummer for 30 Foot Fall at the time), Will Salazar, drummer Donnie Reyes, and vocalist Carl Lockstedt. Carl's tenure was short-lived and Salazar eventually took over vocal duties. The band then recruited bassist Adam Lewis and with this solidified line-up, the four piece immediately set to work by playing extensively on the Texas pop punk scene alongside such renowned bands as 30 Foot Fall, Good Riddance and Goldfinger. Popular venues included local clubs such as Fitzgerald's (whose head of security earned an homage in the Riverfenix song "Skinhead Jessie"). In 1996, the band released their debut EP G.B.O.H. under the Houston-based record label Fuzzgun Records, which they then followed by playing the Mullets Across America Tour with Home Grown, Cousin Oliver and The Hippos. During this time the band would also concentrate on distributing copies of their demos to other record labels. Mojo Records showed interest in the band, however, due to procrastination and indecision the process never came to fruition. However, two Mojo interns Richard and Stefanie Reines, were on the brink of starting their own label, Drive-Thru Records, and agreed to sign Riverfenix as their first band.

=== Riverfenix/Fenix TX (1997–2000) ===
In December 1997, Drive-Thru released Riverfenix's thirteen-track full-length debut Riverfenix, produced by Jim Barnes. Within the following year, the album managed to sell out its first three print runs of 5,000 copies each, which was quite an achievement for an independent record label operating out of the owners' garage. The CD's lyrics and melodies caught the attention of Blink-182's Mark Hoppus, whose sister was at that time dating Riverfenix's DeLaPaz. Hoppus offered the band an opening slot on an upcoming Blink-182 tour, and eventually became their manager. However, due to the schedule of his own band and the popularity of Blink-182's 1999 album Enema of the State, Hoppus passed managing duties onto Blink-182 manager Rick DeVoe. While Riverfenix's song "Speechless" was slowly garnering radio airplay and major labels' attention, Hoppus' effort in promoting Riverfenix was overheard by Blink-182's record label MCA, who showed major interest in signing the band.

Two obstacles, however, separated Riverfenix from MCA: The band was still under contract with Drive-Thru Records, who were unwilling to compromise. Additionally, the estate of late actor River Phoenix filed a cease and desist order against the band, barring further usage of the name Riverfenix. While Drive-Thru Records and MCA settled for a distribution agreement, the band discarded the "River" from their name and appended Texas' postal abbreviation. Thus, Riverfenix became Fenix TX. With a new record deal, Fenix TX re-recorded the majority of their 1997 eponymous album for their MCA debut Fenix TX, and released it on July 13, 1999. The album debuted at No. 115 on the Billboard 200 and reached No. 3 on Billboard's Top Heatseekers. The hit single "All My Fault" received heavy radio and TV airplay, triggered through the song's integration in the TV movie Jailbait (2000), which even featured a cameo appearance by Fenix TX. The music video, in return, starred Alycia Purrott from the cast of Jailbait, as well as Blink-182's Hoppus. "All My Fault" reached No. 21 on the Billboard Modern Rock chart.

=== Lechuza and breakup (2000–2002) ===
Following the success of their MCA debut, Fenix TX went on numerous tours, including the Warped Tour and both national and international tours with label mates New Found Glory. However, in late 2000, drummer Reyes left the band to pursue other interests. To compensate, DeLaPaz took over drumming duties for the band and a search for a new guitarist commenced. In March 2001, James Love was announced as the replacement guitarist. Simultaneously, the band revealed the name of their follow-up record, Lechuza.

Lechuza was released on May 22, 2001, and debuted on No. 87 of the Billboard 200, with its single "Threesome" reaching No. 66 on the UK Singles Chart. The album featured a total of eleven songs, all of which were more raucous and energetic than those on the band's previous efforts, with occasional escapes into heavy metal-esque guitar distortion paired with screaming vocal patterns. One of these songs, "Beating a Dead Horse", explicitly addresses the problems that had arisen within the band.

Shortly after the release of the album James Love left the band and Dennis Hill of the Southern Californian pop punk band Lefty temporarily filled his place, while a permanent replacement was found in Pivit's Chris Lewis (unrelated to bassist Adam Lewis), during a tour with P.O.D. in October 2001. However, he never legally became a member, which ultimately allowed DeLaPaz and Adam Lewis to overrule Salazar in a decision to break up the band. This occurred in the middle of the writing process for what would have become Fenix TX's third album. On September 19, 2002, the disbandment of Fenix TX was officially announced.

=== Denver Harbor and Sing the Body Electric (2002–2004) ===
After the breakup in September 2002, the members of Fenix TX split to form two separate bands: Salazar and Chris Lewis started the post-grunge band Denver Harbor, along with F.O.N. members Aaron and Ilan Rubin. DeLaPaz and Adam Lewis recruited singer Anthony Scalamere, bassist Jason Torbert and ex-Fenix TX guitarist James Love (who was replaced by guitarist/keyboardist Tony Montemarano in February 2004) for their experimental/hardcore side-project Big Black Boat. Soon after the formation, the name of the project was changed first to ChChCh HaHaHa and officially became Sing the Body Electric on February 15, 2004.

Denver Harbor released their debut EP Extended Play on December 16, 2003, and signed with Universal Records in May 2004. Sing the Body Electric recorded their eponymous six song EP Sing the Body Electric, which was released by Restart Records on August 10, 2004, shortly before Denver Harbor's second effort, the full-length album Scenic, issued on October 12, 2004. Sing The Body Electric's album was released on vinyl for the first time in September 2025 by People of Punk Rock Records.

Sing the Body Electric never received major recognition. Singer Anthony Scalamere, who was known for his extreme views on contemporary music—as evidenced by an incident where he bragged about assaulting a person for wearing a Dashboard Confessional T-shirt—clashed with fellow band members. On May 26, 2005, after months of inactivity and a deadlock on Sing the Body Electric's website, Scalamere proclaimed the breakup of the band on their message board in a profanity-plastered diatribe that implicated the unreachability of band members as a major factor. The post ended with the words "sing the body is dead". In response to this, Adam Lewis wrote "Well if Sing The Body Electric is dead, YOU KILLED IT!" Eventually, Adam Lewis formed another band called Sub Rosa based in Los Angeles. Damon DeLaPaz has since formed alternative rock group Demasiado and punk/metal trio Laserwolf and Thunderbolt. He performed with Ape Machine, a rock band from Portland, Oregon, and recorded as a session drummer for various bands and musicians.

=== Reunion, hiatus, and second reunion (2004–2016) ===
On August 14, 2004, Fenix TX played two reunion shows with their last active line-up (consisting of Salazar, Chris Lewis, Adam Lewis and DeLaPaz) at Chain Reaction in Anaheim, California. Both shows were filmed by Drive-Thru Records and slated to be released on DVD format, along with a CD of previously unreleased material. Due to reasons unknown, neither the DVD nor the CD have been released as of May 2009. However, the band reunited again exactly one year later to record a live album at The Clubhouse in Tempe, Arizona, which was released under the title Purple Reign in Blood – Live on November 8, 2005.

To coincide with the new release, Fenix TX announced two farewell tours — the Before the Blackout, After the Breakup Tour in the United States, and the Drive-Thru Invasion Tour 2006 in Japan — running from October 7, 2005, until January 15, 2006. Salazar's and Chris Lewis' other band Denver Harbor supported them on the U.S. tour, which meant that both members were required to perform two sets every night. This, and repeating logistics problems, led to many dates being cancelled on the day they were scheduled. Also, halfway through the tour, DeLaPaz was asked to leave, so Ilan Rubin from Denver Harbor replaced him for the remainder of the tour.

In February 2006, the band played another three shows with No Use for a Name before heading out on a two-week tour with Unwritten Law in the beginning of March. A European tour supported by Pensive — including England, Scotland, France, and Italy — was scheduled to take place in May 2006. However, due to Salazar developing polyps on his vocal folds, the tour was cancelled.

In April 2006, it was officially announced that Ilan Rubin replaced DeLaPaz on drums, and that Fenix TX would record their follow-up to 2001's Lechuza. Beginning on April 29, 2006, at Give It a Name, Rubin also played drums for Lostprophets. Though he has since continued to be their drummer and recorded several tracks for 2006's Liberation Transmission, as well as its successor. He was the drummer for Nine Inch Nails, but since has joined Angels & Airwaves.

On August 14, 2009 (the five-year anniversary of the first Fenix*Tx reunion) it was announced via Fenix Tx's Myspace that the original RiverFenix line-up was reuniting to begin working on new music for release sometime in 2010. However, the band later stated that the announcement of the original lineup reuniting was a mistake, and that they were reuniting with a different lineup. They went on a European tour in October 2010. Fenix Tx released three new tracks "Bending Over Backwards", "Coming Home", "Nothing Seems Bigger Than This" for their SoundCloud on January 4, 2012. Fenix Tx's new song "Spooky Action At a Distance" was featured in MLB 13: The Show.

=== CRE.EP (2016–2021) ===
On March 22, 2016, Donnie Reyes joined the original lineup in Houston, for a performance at the Continental Club.

On April 4, 2016, it was confirmed that Fenix TX had signed to Cyber Tracks, the Los Angeles-based record label owned by NOFX guitarist El Hefe and his wife Jen Abeyta. The five track EP CRE.EP was released on September 30, 2016.

On June 9, 2018, Fenix TX reported that Will Salazar would not be performing with the band during their two scheduled dates of the 2018 Warped Tour. The band reported that Salazar was still a member of the band and that "it just didn't work out."

On September 21, 2021, the band reported via social media that Adam Lewis had been diagnosed with pancreatic cancer.

=== New vocalists and recent activity (2022–present) ===
On October 11, 2022, the band was listed as a part of the lineup for When We Were Young 2023.

On September 8, 2023, the band reported that they had recruited Scott McLaughlin (With Confidence, Unwritten Law) as the vocalist for their upcoming performances at the House of Blues and the 2023 When We Were Young festival. Per the Facebook announcement, Salazar was working on his own projects and would not be a part of the band, and that new material was being written.

On June 11, 2024, it was announced that Adam Lewis had died from pancreatic cancer. He was 45. The band released a single titled "Engines" in honor of Lewis on January 20, 2025.

On August 27, 2025, Arturo Barrios, singer and guitarist for Audio Karate, was announced as the new vocalist for Fenix TX. On October 27, the band announced that Jay Sanchioli had joined the band as their new bassist.

On March 6, 2026, the band released the EP Big Fish under People of Punk Rock Records. The EP was originally recorded between 1999 and 2000, and features an unreleased track titled "Damn For Real?", as well as demos for "Abba Zabba" and "Phoebe Cates" and a track written for a Mountain Dew commercial that aired in 2000.

== Musical style and critical reception ==
"Minimum Wage"
30-second clip, from the album Riverfenix (1997)

"A Song for Everyone"
30-second clip, from the album Lechuza (2001)

"Something Bad Is Gonna Happen"
30-second clip, from the album Lechuza (2001)

During the first years of their career, Fenix TX had difficulty escaping the accusations of being a Blink-182 clone, with The Daily Athenaeum referring to their 1999 sophomore album, Fenix TX, as "a very good Blink-182 album". However, compared to Blink-182's more basic instrumentation, Fenix TX is characterized by more complex guitar accompaniments, due to their TX's dual guitar employment, as well as integrating other instruments, such as trombone and trumpet, and as unconventional vocal techniques into their sound. This allowed the band to touch upon other music genres such as ska punk and hip hop, as heard in the songs "Skinhead Jessie" and "Apple Pie Cowboy Toothpaste". The latter includes a rap originally appearing in the 1984 comedy film Revenge of the Nerds. However, the Fenix TX songs usually features a distortion guitar-driven sound, paired with fast-paced but melodic vocal patterns. Lyrics are conventionally a mix of political, personal, and occasionally comedic topics, as heard in the songs "Minimum Wage", "Ben", and "Rooster Song", respectively.

For Fenix TX's second recording effort, the quartet tried to distinguish themselves from its peers. The resulting album, 2001's Lechuza, was split into two parts, with half of the songs written by Salazar and the other half written by Lewis and DeLaPaz. This organization resulted in a slight shift in musical style. Though a tad edgier than before, Salazar's songs were largely in the vein of Fenix TX's previous material, featuring at times comical, romantic and generally positive themes combined with the band's traditional sound. Lewis' and DeLaPaz' songs, on the other hand, were musically far more metal and hardcore-influenced and commonly featured gang vocals and more aggressive lyrics. While songs such as "Something Bad Is Gonna Happen" stand out with a very crisp lead guitar sound and a high-pitched guitar solo by James Love, "Beating a Dead Horse" (the only Fenix TX song primarily sung by Adam Lewis) contains screamed vocals and an overall hardcore feel.

Due to this stylistic disparity, Lechuza was not as well received by fans and critics as Fenix TX. In particular, the band's attempt at composing a hardcore song ("Beating a Dead Horse") elicited a great amount of criticism. In addition to the album, the band's live performances were largely discredited for their leanings towards alternative metal, rather than a pop punk style. Yet, the loyalty of many fans outweighed the disappointment over the album, though a third full-length effort by Fenix TX would have continued in a harder direction, as the member's post-breakup projects featured material that was originally intended for the follow-up to Lechuza.

In 2025, Terry Bezer of Screen Rant included the band in his list of "10 Forgotten Pop-Punk Bands Who Deserve To Be Better Remembered".

== Members ==
=== Musicians ===
Current members

- Damon DeLaPaz – guitar, backing vocals (1995–2000, 2023–present); drums (2000–2002, 2005–2006, 2016–2023); bass (2024–2025)
- Donnie Reyes – drums (1995–2000; 2023–present)
- Arturo Barrios – lead vocals, guitar (2025–present)
- Chris Lewis – guitar, backing vocals (2001–2002, 2005–present)
- Jay Sanchioli - bass, backing vocals (2025–present)

Former members

- William Salazar – lead vocals, guitar (1995–2002, 2005–2006, 2009–2022)
- Adam Lewis – bass, backing vocals (1995–2002, 2005–2009, 2013–2024; his death)
- Carl Lockstedt – lead vocals (1995; only with band as Riverfenix)
- James Love – guitar (2000–2001)
- Ilan Rubin – drums (2006–2009)
- Aaron Thompson – bass, backing vocals (2010–2012)
- Trevor Faris – drums (2010–2012)
- Hayden Scott – drums (2013–2016)
- Scott McLaughlin – lead vocals, guitar (2023–2025)

=== Lineups ===
1995 (as Riverfenix)	1995–1998 (as Riverfenix), 1998–2000 (as Fenix TX)	2000–2001	2001–2002 (before disbanding), 2005–2006 (after reunion)
Carl Lockstedt – lead vocals; William Salazar – guitar; Damon DeLaPaz – guitar; Adam Lewis – bass; Donnie Reyes – drums	William Salazar – lead vocals, guitar; Damon DeLaPaz – guitar, backing vocals; Adam Lewis – bass, backing vocals; Donnie Reyes – drums	William Salazar – lead vocals, guitar; James Love – guitar; Adam Lewis – bass, backing vocals; Damon DeLaPaz – drums, guitar, backing vocals	William Salazar – lead vocals, guitar; Chris Lewis – guitar, backing vocals; Adam Lewis – bass, backing vocals; Damon DeLaPaz – drums, guitar, backing vocals
2006–2009	2010–2012	2013 – March 2016	March 2016 – September 2023
William Salazar – lead vocals, guitar; Chris Lewis – guitar, backing vocals; Adam Lewis – bass, backing vocals; Ilan Rubin – drums	William Salazar – lead vocals, guitar; Chris Lewis – guitar, backing vocals; Aaron Thompson – bass, backing vocals; Trevor Faris – drums	William Salazar – lead vocals, guitar; Chris Lewis – guitar, backing vocals; Adam Lewis – bass, backing vocals; Hayden Scott – drums	William Salazar – lead vocals, guitar; Chris Lewis – guitar, backing vocals; Adam Lewis – bass, backing vocals; Damon DeLaPaz – drums
September 2023 – June 2024	June 2024 – August 2025	August 2025 – October 2025	October 2025 – Present
Chris Lewis – guitar, backing vocals; Adam Lewis – bass, backing vocals; Damon DeLaPaz – guitar, backing vocals; Donnie Reyes – drums; Scott McLaughlin – lead vocals, guitar	Chris Lewis – guitar, backing vocals; Damon DeLaPaz – bass, guitar, backing vocals; Donnie Reyes – drums; Scott McLaughlin – lead vocals, guitar	Chris Lewis – guitar, backing vocals; Damon DeLaPaz – bass, guitar, backing vocals; Donnie Reyes – drums; Arturo Barrios – lead vocals, guitar	Jay Sanchioli – bass, backing vocals; Chris Lewis – guitar, backing vocals; Damon DeLaPaz – guitar, backing vocals; Donnie Reyes – drums; Arturo Barrios – lead vocals, guitar

== Discography ==
=== Studio albums ===
- Riverfenix (1997; as Riverfenix)
- Fenix TX (1999) US No. 115
- Lechuza (2001) US No. 87

=== Extended plays ===
- G.B.O.H. (1996; as Riverfenix)
- CRE.EP (2016)
- Big Fish (2026)

=== Live ===
- Purple Reign In Blood – Live (2005)

=== Singles ===
Year	Title	US Mod	UK	Album
2000	"All My Fault"	21	—	Fenix TX
2002	"Threesome"	—	—	Lechuza
2002	"Katie W."	—	66	Lechuza
2012	"Spooky Action at a Distance"	—	—	CRE.EP
2025	"Engines"	—	—	N/A
"—" denotes a release that did not chart.

== Other sources ==
1. "Fenix TX Reunite to Record Live Album/US and World Tour in the Works". Archived from the original on November 26, 2005. (Internet Archive mirror)
2. "HotStar Fenix TX". Pollstar. Archived from the original on February 19, 2002.
3. "Fenix TX's 7 Deadly Sins". Punk Updates.
4. "Fenix TX: Artist Chart History". Billboard.
5. "FENIX TX – 9 Questions With Adam". PopPunk.com. Archived from the original on December 18, 2005.
6. "Chart Log UK". The Zobbel Website.
7. "Will Salazar (ex-FenixTX) Interview". RockingTheScene.com. Archived from the original on May 15, 2006.
8. Anthony Scalamere. "YOU WANT A NEW FUCKING POST". Sing the Body Electric Forum. Archived from the original on July 22, 2012.
9. Anthony Scalamere. "i guess this is it". Sing the Body Electric Forum. Archived from the original on July 22, 2012.
10. "Fenix TX – Interview with Will". DecoyMusic.com. Archived from the original on May 22, 2006.
11. "FenixTX ready to start anew". Rehearsals.com. Archived from the original on September 27, 2007.
12. "First Listening". The Daily Athenaeum Interactive. Archived from the original on May 30, 2001.
13. "Fenix TX – Lechuza review". Last Life Media. Archived from the original on January 25, 2005. (Internet Archive mirror)
14. "R-JENERATION: Relient K concert moves both fans and lead singer". reviewjournal.com.
