= Jerry Finn =

American record producer (1969–2008)

- Finn in 2001

Background information
- Also known as: "Huckle" Jerry Finn; Huckle Finn; Finnbad
- Born: Jermone Gregory Finn; March 31, 1969; Ventura, California, U.S.
- Died: August 21, 2008 (aged 39) Los Angeles, California, U.S.
- Genres: Punk rock; alternative rock; pop-punk
- Occupations: Record producer; audio engineer
- Years active: 1992–2008

Jermone Gregory Finn (March 31, 1969 – August 21, 2008), sometimes credited as "Huckle" Jerry Finn, was an American record producer and mix engineer. He worked with numerous punk rock and pop-punk artists such as Blink-182, AFI, Sum 41, Alkaline Trio, Green Day, MxPx, and Rancid. Finn was known for the warm guitar tone present on albums he produced as well as the "punchy" sound of his mixes. He was instrumental in developing the polished sound of pop-punk in its second wave of popularity between the mid-1990s and early 2000s.

A graduate of the Dick Grove School of Music, Finn began his career in the early 1990s as an assistant engineer at various Hollywood-based studios. He began an association with producer Rob Cavallo, with whom he engineered and mixed Green Day's Dookie (1994). Finn's career subsequently prospered, as he moved from being an engineer to producing albums with the likes of Pennywise and Rancid. Finn forged a strong bond with Blink-182, producing four albums with them, beginning with Enema of the State (1999). He also worked extensively with Sum 41 and Alkaline Trio, and over the course of the 2000s, worked on several albums with Morrissey.

Known for his kind manner and technical expertise, Finn was valued by engineers and musicians alike. Scott Heisel of Alternative Press wrote that Finn often "helped rough punk bands refine their sound, and helped them discover the power of a good vocal hook."

Finn suffered a brain hemorrhage in July 2008, and died the following month.

== Career ==
Jerry Finn was born on March 31, 1969, in Ventura, California. When asked about his ancestry in a later interview, Finn did not know, noting he was adopted. The first music he remembered hearing was the soundtrack to Fiddler on the Roof. He attended Dick Grove School of Music. He became an assistant at The Music Grinder in Hollywood in the early 1990s, and he was later hired as a second engineer. Finn then moved to Devonshire Sound Studios, where he met Rob Cavallo. He became a "right-hand man" to Cavallo, who at the time was producing Green Day's major-label debut, Dookie (1994). When the band declared themselves dissatisfied with the original mix, Finn and Cavallo set to work again and came up with a brighter mix. "Anyone who heard Green Day's first two records knew the breakout potential was there, but it took Cavallo and Finn to draw it out," wrote Alternative Press.

Afterwards, Finn worked as an assistant at Conway Recording Studios, which he regarded as his favorite studio to work in. He left the job after several months to pursue work independently because of the success of Dookie. "Being realistic about the music business, I thought I'd have a red[-]hot career for six months and then be back assisting, so when I left I made them promise that when my career fell apart they'd hire me back as an assistant," Finn joked in 2006. According to engineer Ed Cherney, Dookie's success made Finn "the great hope of every assistant engineer everywhere." Finn characterized the massive change in his life thanks to the success of the album: "Before [Green Day], I was an assistant making eight bucks an hour. I was producing gold records less than a year after them." Soon, Finn began a fruitful association with Epitaph Records, and he co-produced Pennywise's About Time (1995) alongside the label's founder, Bad Religion guitarist Brett Gurewitz. Finn's first solo production endeavor, Rancid's …And Out Come the Wolves, came the same year. He mixed the "landmark punk album" Dear You by Jawbreaker in 1995 and The Suicide Machines' Destruction by Definition in 1996, the latter described by Alternative Press as "a watershed moment for ska-punk."

Finn forged a particularly strong bond with Blink-182 in the late 1990s. He first worked with the band to record "Mutt" for the American Pie soundtrack, after which he produced their breakthrough album Enema of the State and they chose to "never work with anyone else again." According to writer James Montgomery, "[Finn] served as an invaluable member of the Blink team: part adviser, part impartial observer, he helped smooth out tensions and hone their multiplatinum sound." When recording sessions became contentious, Finn would often smooth over differences with humor, advice, and a new perspective, according to bassist Mark Hoppus. "Recording can get pretty monotonous, but at least we could laugh with Jerry. A pretty typical day would involve multiple takes for one part of one song, and then everyone would get naked and jump on Jerry," he said. He subsequently returned to produce The Mark, Tom, and Travis Show (2000), Take Off Your Pants and Jacket (2001) and Blink-182 (2003). He also produced the 2002 self-titled debut album by Box Car Racer, which featured guitarist Tom DeLonge and drummer Travis Barker, and co-produced and mixed When Your Heart Stops Beating (2006) by +44, which featured Hoppus and Barker. He was approached to produce DeLonge's follow-up band, Angels & Airwaves, but reportedly declined.

Finn co-produced AFI's major-label debut Sing the Sorrow (2003), which has been called a "landmark in the post-hardcore genre." Alternative Press wrote that "None of it would've been possible had Jerry Finn not manned the boards and polished the band's previously metallic sound into spike-covered punk-rock candy cane." In his later years, Finn worked with Morrissey on his best-selling You Are the Quarry (2004). Morrissey was introduced to Finn via a mutual friend and was effusive about his work: "He made me feel very confident. He's not easily pleased and he's not prepared to be overwrought. He knows exactly what he wants to do." Finn's last production credits included Decemberunderground (2006) by AFI, Music from Regions Beyond (2007) by Tiger Army, and Years of Refusal (2009), for which he reunited with Morrissey.

== Personal life and death ==
Finn lived in a residence located behind the Riot House, a Hyatt hotel historically associated with rock musicians on the Sunset Strip. Friends later recalled that he frequently shared stories about the area's history in rock music. Professionally, Finn preferred working out of public view and avoided media attention, routinely declining interviews. He was regarded by peers as being deeply devoted to music and to the people close to him.

In July 2008, Finn suffered a medical emergency while having lunch with a member of the band Tiger Army at Café Med in West Hollywood. During the meal, he collapsed after experiencing a intracerebral hemorrhage. He later suffered a heart attack. He was transported by ambulance to Cedars-Sinai Medical Center, where he remained in a coma and never regained consciousness. He was taken off of life support on August 9 after never regaining consciousness, and he died on August 21, 2008. A memorial service was held several weeks later in the parking lot of Conway Recording Studios, his favorite recording location. The gathering featured a photo montage set to "God Only Knows" by The Beach Boys, which played on repeat throughout the service.

Following Finn's death, Dexter Holland of The Offspring posted a statement on their website regarding his death: "We would like to extend our deepest sympathy to the family of Jerry Finn. We worked with Jerry in the studio many times over the years, and he produced the songs "Can't Repeat" and "Next To You" for our Greatest Hits album. He was a pleasure to be around and we are thankful for the time we were able to spend with him. Jerry left his mark on countless great records, and he will be missed. RIP, my friend. Dexter".

In February 2017, more than 200 pieces of Finn’s recording equipment were made available to the public through a special online shop hosted by Reverb.com in partnership with the Los Angeles–based gear reseller Techno Empire. The collection included a wide range of professional audio gear—such as amplifiers, studio effects, microphones, and outboard processors. A portion of the proceeds were donated to the Recording Academy's MusiCares Foundation.

== Recording style and influences ==
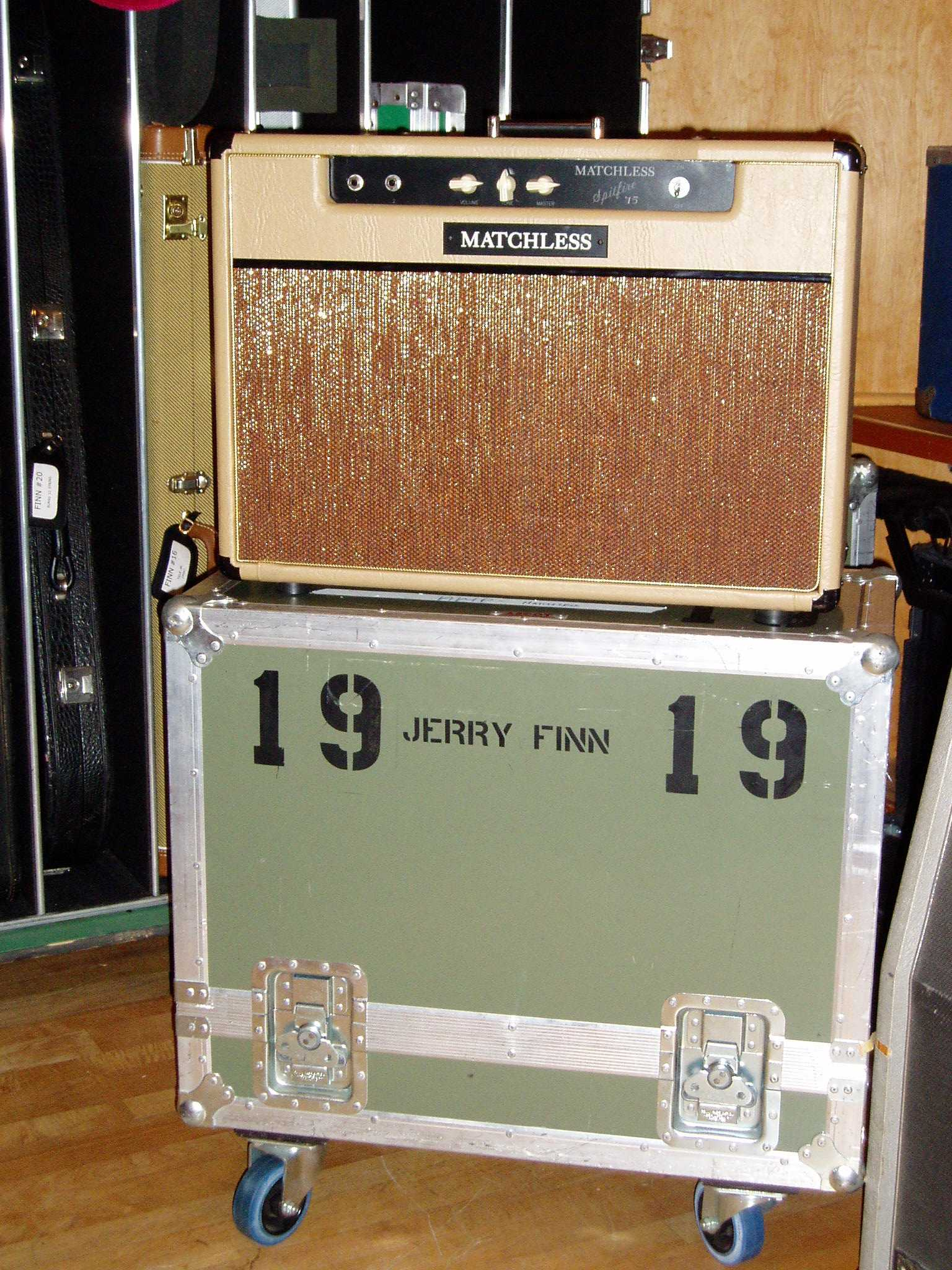
Finn's recording equipment at Conway Recording Studios in September 2003.

Finn was known for his methodical, technically focused approach to recording. Blink-182 bassist Mark Hoppus called Finn "meticulous in getting great sounds". Even as digital audio workstations became standard in professional studios, he continued to favor analog methods, preferring to track sessions on traditional tape rather than adopt contemporary software-based workflows. His setups frequently incorporated extensive racks of vintage equipment, and sessions often involved prolonged experimentation to capture subtle variations in sound. Finn reportedly owned over 100 guitars, and he would often bring large collections of instruments and amplifiers to the studio. Rather than rely on software-based effects, Finn frequently employed physical or analog techniques. For example, he constructed makeshift reverb chambers on-site and created flanging effects by synchronizing dual tape machines instead of using digital plug-ins.

For drum tracking, Finn maintained large selections of snare drums and other instruments to facilitate detailed tonal comparisons. Considering recording drums to be a "lost art," Finn took great interest in this step of the process. He often focused on room microphones to capture drum ambience naturally. Similar attention to nuance was applied to guitar recording, with teams testing numerous combinations of guitars, strings, amplifiers, speaker cabinets, microphones, and microphone placements. In some instances, Finn spent hours evaluating differences among individual cables and arranged studio wiring at right angles to minimize electromagnetic interference. Finn was known for this warm, dynamic guitar sound, featured prominently on Blink-182 albums and Sum 41's All Killer No Filler (2001). "Whenever I could corner him at a party, I harassed him about how he gets guitar sounds and how he gets his mixes to sound so punchy," said producer and Goldfinger frontman John Feldmann. Finn achieved the sound by recording instruments through more than one amplifier at the same time. "Many engineers try to keep everything separate and add effects later," said Finn. "Players play to the sound, so you just have to get a sound and go with it. This allows you to mix tones together to get just the right sound."

He estimated that it took him 10–12 days to mix an album, though some took less or more. Upon reviewing rough mixes, Finn would attempt to craft the mix around the "sound in [his] head" he created. In mixing songs, Finn preferred to first "get the drums happening to where they have some ambience," followed by the vocal tracks. In terms of mixing bass and drums—"perhaps the most difficult task of a mixing engineer," according to Bobby Owsinski—Finn preferred to have the "kick [drum] and the bass ... occupying their own territory and not fighting each other." He felt the "sound of modern records today is compression. Every time I try to be a purist and go, 'You know, I'm not gonna compress that,' the band comes in and goes, 'Why isn't that compressed?'" When setting the compressor, Finn would set the attack slow and the release fast so that "all the transients are getting through and initial punch is still there, but it releases instantly when the signal drops below the threshold." Finn called this "the sound of my mixes. It keeps things kinda popping the whole time."

As for Finn's producing style, Travis Barker wrote, "[Jerry] was more about giving us ideas and lending an extra set of ears. He'd say, 'Hey, that sounds cool—why doesn't that part at the end go a little longer?' Or 'What if this song had an intro?'" Frequent collaborators to Finn included drum technician Mike Fasano, and engineers Sean O'Dwyer, Ryan Hewitt and Joe McGrath. He was also known for working with keyboardist Roger Joseph Manning Jr., whom he brought into Blink-182, Alkaline Trio and Morrissey sessions. Finn credited John Bonham as a musical inspiration growing up, and Don Was, Ed Cherney, Mick Guzauski, John Purdell, and Duane Baron as influential on his recording techniques.

== Legacy ==
Finn was known for his genial demeanor and technical prowess. According to Pierre Perrone of The Independent, "He could act as a sounding board or confidant and push musicians and singers to perform at their best. He would order food and shoot the breeze with his clients and generally create a relaxed atmosphere." Finn would occasionally mix albums for independent bands or friends "from anywhere from free to half [his] rate" because he enjoyed the music. Bobby Owsinski, author of The Mixing Engineer's Handbook, wrote that Finn "represented one of the new generation of mixers who knows all the rules but is perfectly willing to break them." After his death, Alternative Press compiled a list of nine "classic" albums helmed by Finn, writing that "Finn's bread and butter during the past decade was helping rough punk bands refine their sound, and helping them discover the power of a good vocal hook."

Finn's impact on Blink-182 led bassist Mark Hoppus to dub him the "fourth member" of the band. "Every day I spent with Jerry over the past 10 years, I feel like he taught me something new about music, or recording, or life," he wrote after his death. "Jerry wasn't some asshole rolling up to the studio in a Bentley—he was one of us. He could be honest with us, and we would listen to him," drummer Travis Barker remembered in his memoir Can I Say (2015). When the band reconvened to work on their reunion album Neighborhoods (2011), the band found it very difficult to work without Finn. They continued to work alone into 2016, until they recruited co-founder of third-wave ska band Goldfinger, John Feldmann for their seventh album California. Feldmann considers himself a disciple of Finn, commenting, "the sound of my records was influenced by the records Jerry made."

== Production discography ==
This list does not include greatest hits compilations. Finn was producer unless otherwise noted.

Name of artist, release, details, and year released.
Year	Artist	Release	Details	Ref.
1992	Color Me Badd	Young, Gifted & Badd: The Remixes	Assistant engineer, remix assistant	
1992	PH Factor	PH Factor	Assistant engineer	
1993	Everette Harp	Common Ground	Mixing	
1993	Ill Repute	Big Rusty Balls	Engineer and mixing	
1993	León Gieco	Mensajes del Alma	Assistant	
1993	Lea Salonga	Lea Salonga	Assistant engineer	
1993	Man	"Chocolate Rocket"		
1993	The Muffs	The Muffs	Assistant engineer	
1993	Taj Mahal	Dancing the Blues	Engineer	
1993	999	You Us It!	Engineered	
1994	Alvin and the Chipmunks	A Very Merry Chipmunk	Assistant engineer	
1994	Body Count	Born Dead	Assistant engineer	
1994	Front Page	Front Page	Second engineer	
1994	Green Day	Dookie	Mixing	
1994	Green Day	Woodstock '94	Mixing ("When I Come Around")	
1994	Matthew Sweet	Son of Altered Beast	Assistant mixing	
1994	Maria Muldaur	Meet Me at Midnite	Engineer, assistant engineer	
1994	Patrice Rushen	Anything But Ordinary	Assistant engineer	
1994	Peter Rodgers Melnick	Arctic Blue	Engineer	
1995	Ash	"Kung-Fu / Jack Names the Planets"	Mixing	
1995	Dance Hall Crashers	Lockjaw	Mixing	
1995	Goo Goo Dolls	A Boy Named Goo	Engineer and mixing	
1995	Goo Goo Dolls	"Don't Change"		
1995	Green Day	Insomniac	Mixing	
1995	Green Day	The Jerky Boys	Remix ("2000 Light Years Away")	
1995	IV Xample	For Example	Engineer	
1995	Jawbreaker	Dear You	Mixing	
1995	Love Spit Love	Angus: Music from the Motion Picture	Mixing ("Am I Wrong")	
1995	The Muffs	Blonder and Blonder	Engineer and mixing	
1995	Pennywise	About Time	Producer and engineer	
1995	Rancid	...And Out Come the Wolves	Producer and mixing	
1995	Slash's Snakepit	It’s Five O’Clock Somewhere	Engineer	
1995	That Dog	Totally Crushed Out!	Mixing	
1995	Weezer	Angus: Music from the Motion Picture	Engineer ("You Gave Your Love to Me Softly")	
1996	Daredevils	"Hate You"		
1996	Fastball	Make Your Mama Proud		
1996	Goo Goo Dolls	"Hit or Miss"		
1996	Green Day	Bowling Bowling Bowling Parking Parking	Mixing ("Dominated Love Slave")	
1996	Green Day	"Brain Stew / Jaded"	Mixing ("Do Da Da")	
1996	Jawbreaker	Jabberjaw...Pure Sweet Hell	Mixing ("Sister")	
1996	Magnapop	Fire All Your Guns at Once	Mixing	
1996	N.Y. Loose	Year of the Rat	Mixing	
1996	The Presidents of the United States of America	II	Mixing	
1996	Schleprock	(America's) Dirty Little Secret	Mixing	
1996	The Suicide Machines	Destruction By Definition	Mixing	
1996	Sukia	Contacto Especial con el Tercer Sexo		
1996	Van Gogh's Daughter	Shove	Mixing	
1997	Coward	Coward	Producer and mixing	
1997	Green Day	"Good Riddance (Time of Your Life)"	Mixing ("Rotting")	
1997	Kara's Flowers	The Fourth World	Engineer	
1997	Millencolin	"Lozin' Must"	Remix ("The Story of My Life")	
1997	Smoking Popes	Destination Failure		
1998	Liars Inc.	Superjaded	Mixing	
1998	The Living End	The Living End	Mixing	
1998	Madness	Universal Madness	Mixing	
1998	The Presidents of the United States of America	"Tiki God"	Mixing ("Tiki Lounge God")	
1998	Rancid	Life Won't Wait	Mixing	
1998	Superdrag	Head Trip in Every Key	Co-producer, engineer, and mixing	
1998	The Vandals	Hitler Bad, Vandals Good	Mixing	
1999
1999	Blink-182	Enema of the State	Producer and mixing ("The Party Song" and "Wendy Clear")	
1999	Blink-182	"Family Reunion"	Producer and mixing	
1999	Fenix*TX	Fenix*TX		
1999	The Offspring	"Beheaded"		
1999	The Offspring	"The Kids Aren't Alright"	Mixing	
2000	Blink-182	The Mark, Tom, and Travis Show (The Enema Strikes Back)	Producer and mixing	
2000	Green Day	86 (Live from Prague)	Mixing	
2000	Marvelous 3	"Reelin' in the Years"		
2000	Marvelous 3	ReadySexGo!		
2000	MxPx	The Ever Passing Moment		
2000	New Found Glory	"Hit or Miss"	Mixing (Note: Finn's mix of "Hit or Miss", unreleased at the time, was later included on a 2010 reissue of New Found Glory.)	
2000	Sum 41	Half Hour of Power	Mixing	
2001	Alkaline Trio	From Here to Infirmary	Mixing	
2001	Blink-182	Take Off Your Pants and Jacket		
2001	Fenix*TX	Lechuza		
2001	MxPx	Fat Club		
2001	Sum 41	All Killer No Filler		
2002	Bad Religion	The Process of Belief	Mixing	
2002	Box Car Racer	Box Car Racer		
2002	MxPx	"Christmas Party"	Mixing	
2002	Sparta	Wiretap Scars		
2003	AFI	Sing the Sorrow		
2003	Alkaline Trio	Good Mourning	Co-producer and mixing	
2003	Blink-182	Blink-182	Producer and mixing	
2003	The Offspring	"I Wanna Be Sedated"		
2003	Vendetta Red	Between the Never and the Now		
2004	Marjorie Fair	Self Help Serenade		
2004	Morrissey	You Are the Quarry		
2004	Nancy Sinatra	"Let Me Kiss You"	Mixing	
2004	The Vandals	Hollywood Potato Chip	Mixing	
2005	Alkaline Trio	Crimson		
2005	Blink-182	Greatest Hits	Producer and mixing ("Not Now" and "Another Girl, Another Planet")	
2005	Eisley	Room Noises	Mixing	
2005	The Offspring	"Can't Repeat"		
2006	AFI	Decemberunderground		
2006	+44	When Your Heart Stops Beating	Co-producer and mixing	
2007	Tiger Army	Music from Regions Beyond		
2009	Morrissey	Years of Refusal		
