= 30 Foot Fall =

American punk rock band

- Origin: Houston, Texas, United States
- Genres: Punk rock, melodic hardcore, skate punk, hardcore punk
- Years active: 1993–present (On hiatus: 2019-2022)
- Labels: People of Punk Rock Records, It's Opposite Day And I Love You Records Nitro Records, Fearless Records Fuzzgun Records, Paranoid Records
- Members: James "Butch" Klotz (vocals); Chris Vasquez (guitar); Rubio Cisneros (bass); Brian Davis (drums)
- Past members: Tony Avitia (guitar); Damon DeLaPaz (drums); Chris La Forge (guitar); Jason Davis (guitar)

30 Foot Fall (stylized as 30footFALL) is an American punk rock band that began in Houston, Texas.

== History ==
The band played their first show on Mother's Day in 1993 and after a few lineup changes, were composed of Rubio Cisneros on drums, Mitch on bass, Tony Avitia on guitar, and Butch Klotz on vocals. Shortly after releasing their first demo, Mitch left the Houston area to get married. He was replaced by Jeff, before Rubio took over the bass role. Damon DeLaPaz filled in the drum position, and this lineup recording the self titled 1994 demo, along with the group's first EP, Elementary School Love, that same year. Ativia then left the group to start I-45 and after a few temporary guitarists, Chris LaForge of I-End Result picked up as their official guitarist. This lineup remained stable during their most active period in the mid to late 90s. Touring Houston, Dallas, and Austin, 30 Foot Fall's popularity grew; they would later become openers for larger bands such as Screeching Weasel and Sum-41 among others.

In 1995, on Fuzzgun Records, they released their first studio album Divided We Stand. In 1996 they also released their second EP, Junior High Sucked 7. After hearing a demo, Bob Becker of Fearless Records signed 30 Foot Fall to a record deal and in 1997 produced their next album Acme-143.

The band toured extensively alongside other notable bands such as Bigwig and Diesel Boy.. They self released the EP Cartoons in 1998. Two of the three songs from Cartoons were included on their next album. At this time, DeLaPaz received a record deal offer with MCA Records for his other band Fenix*TX and moved to California. Brian Davis of Middlefinger was brought in to replace him.

In 1999, the band released their most successful album, Ever Revolving, Never Evolving, on Nitro Records. The release was followed by numerous shows including a tour with The Vandals. Despite being at the height of their popularity, and with a looming tour with The Offspring planned for later that year, 30footFALL instead went on hiatus after the conclusion of their 1999 tour, citing the need to spend more time with family with personal issues back home in Houston. As a result, Chris LaForge left the band at this time to seek other musical ventures. Jason Davis (brother of drummer Brian Davis), and also formerly of Middlefinger, was brought on to play guitar when they resumed playing locally in the spring of 2000. This line-up recorded The Doppler Effect in 2002, intended to be their last album. At this time, 30footFALL chose not to tour for the new album. Instead, the band chose to play occasional Houston/Dallas/Austin shows and their annual 30footFALL Christmas show at Fitzgerald's in Houston, TX. In 2003, with Chris LaForge back in the group, they released 10yearsandstillFALLING, a live album which documents their ten years as a band.

At their 2005 Christmas Show, Klotz announced that he would be moving to Virginia, ending his 12 years in the Houston punk scene.

On December 25, 2010, at their 16th annual Christmas Show, the band self-released their Jesus, Elvis, and Richard Petty EP, which was their first studio release since 2002's The Doppler Effect. In 2012, 30footFALL were featured in When We Ruled H-Town, which documents Houston punk bands and their rise to popularity in the 1990s.

On June 30, 2014, Klotz announced that he would be returning to Houston after nearly nine years in Virginia. 30footFALL acknowledged this and planned a show for August 30, 2014, at Fitzgerald's. The band played a brief set in October at The Continental Club with former drummer Damon DeLaPaz, reuniting their 1994-1998 lineup.

In March 2015, 30footFALL unveiled two new songs at a show at Griff's Bar, entitled "Champion Song" and "National Treasure." Another song, "Maybe You Could Be The One", was debuted soon after. They began playing more shows over the next few years, including the Remember the Punks Festival in October 2016 and opening up for Screeching Weasel in early 2017.

Chris LaForge died unexpectedly following a stroke at age 42 on May 29, 2017. His final show with the band was at the Nightingale Room in April 2017. Despite uncertainty regarding their future, 30footFALL played their scheduled June show at Saint Arnold's brewery with Skeleton Dick guitarist Chris Vasquez and Arnett Vaughn filling in on guitars.

While playing a brief tour with Bigwig in October 2017, it was announced that Chris Vasquez had officially replaced LaForge on lead guitar. 30footFALL confirmed they will release a new album and that LaForge's guitar tracks will be featured, although these plans would later change as the material continued to be worked on with Chris Vasquez. "Champion Song" was released on October 27, and is the final track to feature LaForge's guitar playing. 30footFALL held a memorial show for LaForge in March 2018, and held their final Christmas show that year due to the closure of Fitzgerald's in early 2019.

After playing a Southside Skate Park benefit in mid 2019, 30footFALL embarked on a near three-year hiatus as result of the COVID-19 pandemic. They played their first show in three years on June 11, 2022, once again at Southside Skate Park in Houston, as part of a benefit to donate to children with heart defects. They next played on September 30 at Trip Six, playing new material. The Christmas show made a comeback after four years at Number's Nightclub that December.

On November 28, they announced they had officially signed with People of Punk Rock Records, with their first releases on the label being a vinyl, CD, and cassette reissue of The Doppler Effect, along with a similar reissue for the rare 10yearsandstillFALLING live album from 2003.

30footFALL played a set as Bickley for the 2023 You Ain't Punk show in January at Black Magic Social Club. On May 5, they released their first new song in over five years, titled "Maybe You Could Be The One", which had been played sporadically at concerts since 2015. The song is the first recording to feature Chris Vasquez on guitar. The next day, 30footFALL celebrated their 30th Anniversary at the Heights Theatre. This was the final show to feature longtime guitarist Jason Davis. Aaron Echegaray temporarily filled at Kickbutt Coffee in Austin a few weeks later, along with their festival performances in Canada at Red Bridge Fest. The group would instead decide to remain as a four piece, and played numerous Texas dates throughout 2023, in what ended up as their most active year since 1999.

In March 2024, 30footFALL released their first EP in over 13 years, National Treasure...And Other LaForgeries. In addition to including a new recording of Champion Song and the previously released Maybe You Could Be The One, it also includes the title track, debuted live in 2015, and two additional songs debuted at the 2022 Trip Six show. This marks the first full release to include Chris Vasquez on guitar, and serves as the final recordings with Jason Davis on guitar.

In addition to playing Dallas, Austin, Corpus Christi, and Houston dates in support of the EP, 30footFALL played Brakrock in Belgium in August 2024. In December, they released their second live album, "Live at Fitzgerald's", which documents their final Christmas Show at Fitzgerald's in 2018.

In January, People of Punk Rock reissued 2010's Jesus, Elvis, and Richard Petty EP and pressed it on vinyl for the first time. In May, 30footFALL released a new single entitled "My First Show." Butch will play a number of acoustic dates with Lagwagon's Joey Cape in Canada throughout the summer.

== Band members ==
Current

- James "Butch" Klotz – lead vocals (1993–present)
- Chris Vasquez – guitars (2017–present)
- Rubio Cisneros – bass (1994–present); drums (1993–1994)
- Brian Davis – drums (1998–present)

Former

- Only members who recorded are included. 30footFALL had multiple short-term members in its early years.
- Tony Avitia - guitars (1993–1994)
- Mitch M.- bass (1993–1994)
- Damon DeLaPaz - drums (1994–1998)
- Chris "Delron" LaForge - guitars (1994–1999, 2003–2017; died 2017)
- Jason Davis -guitars (1999–2023)

== Discography ==
- Neartown Demo (Fallin'Down Productions, 1993)
- 30footFALL Demo (Broken Note Records, 1994)
- Elementary School Love EP (Yo Mama's Records, 1994)
- Divided We Stand (Fuzzgun Records, 1995)/Fearless Records, 1998)
- Junior High Sucked EP (Twistworthy Records, 1996)
- Acme-143 (Fearless Records, 1997)
- Cartoons EP (Paranoid Records, 1998)
- Ever Revolving, Never Evolving (Nitro Records, 1999)
- The Doppler Effect (It's Opposite Day And I Love You Records, 2002) (People of Punk Rock Records, 2022)
- 10yearsandstillFALLING Live (It's Opposite Day And I Love You Records, 2003) (People of Punk Rock Records, 2022)
- Jesus, Elvis, and Richard Petty EP (It's Opposite Day And I Love You Records, 2010) (People of Punk Rock Records, 2025)
- Champion Song (Single) (It's Opposite Day And I Love You Records, 2017)
- Maybe You Could Be The One (Single) (People Of Punk Rock Records, 2023)
- National Treasure...And Other LaForgeries EP (People Of Punk Rock Records, 2024)
- Live At Fitzgerald's (People Of Punk Rock Records, 2024)
- Better Off Dead (Single) (People Of Punk Rock Records, 2025)
- My First Show (Single) (People Of Punk Rock Records, 2025)
- Something Beautiful/Words (Single) (People Of Punk Rock Records, 2025)
