= List of songs recorded by Blink-182 =

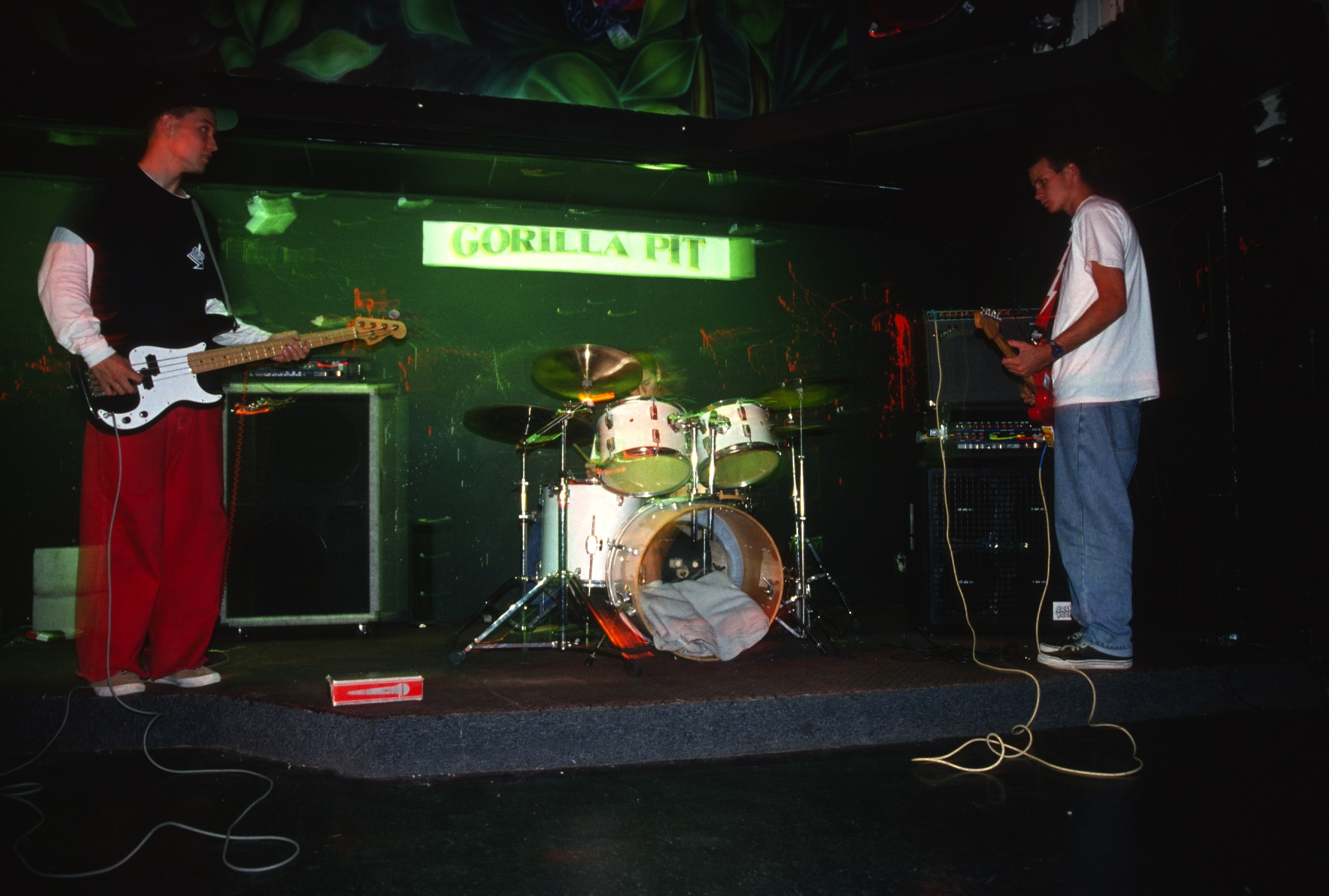
The original lineup of Mark Hoppus, Scott Raynor and Tom DeLonge recorded the albums Buddha (1994), Cheshire Cat (1995) and Dude Ranch (1997), and the song "I Won't Be Home for Christmas" (2001).

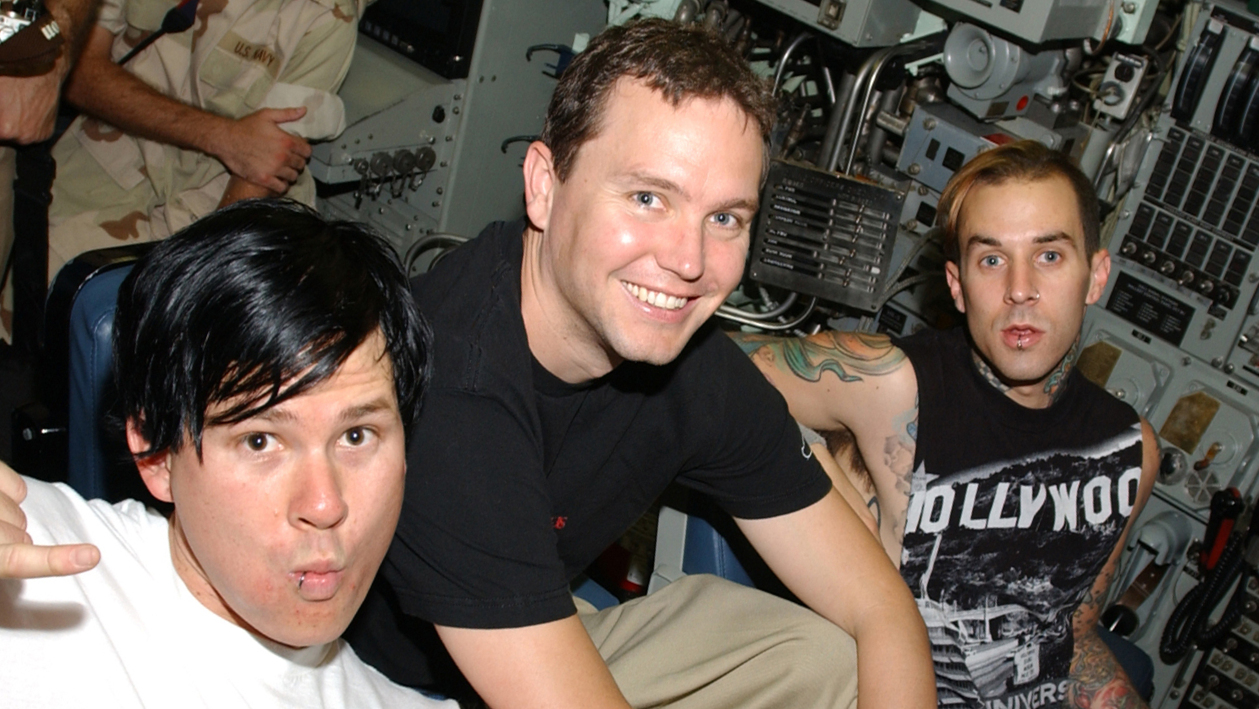
The 1998–2005 lineup of DeLonge, Hoppus and Travis Barker recorded the albums Enema of the State (1999), The Mark, Tom, and Travis Show (2000), Take Off Your Pants and Jacket (2001) and Blink-182 (2003), as well as the songs "Family Reunion" (1999), "Not Now" (2005) and non-album cover versions.

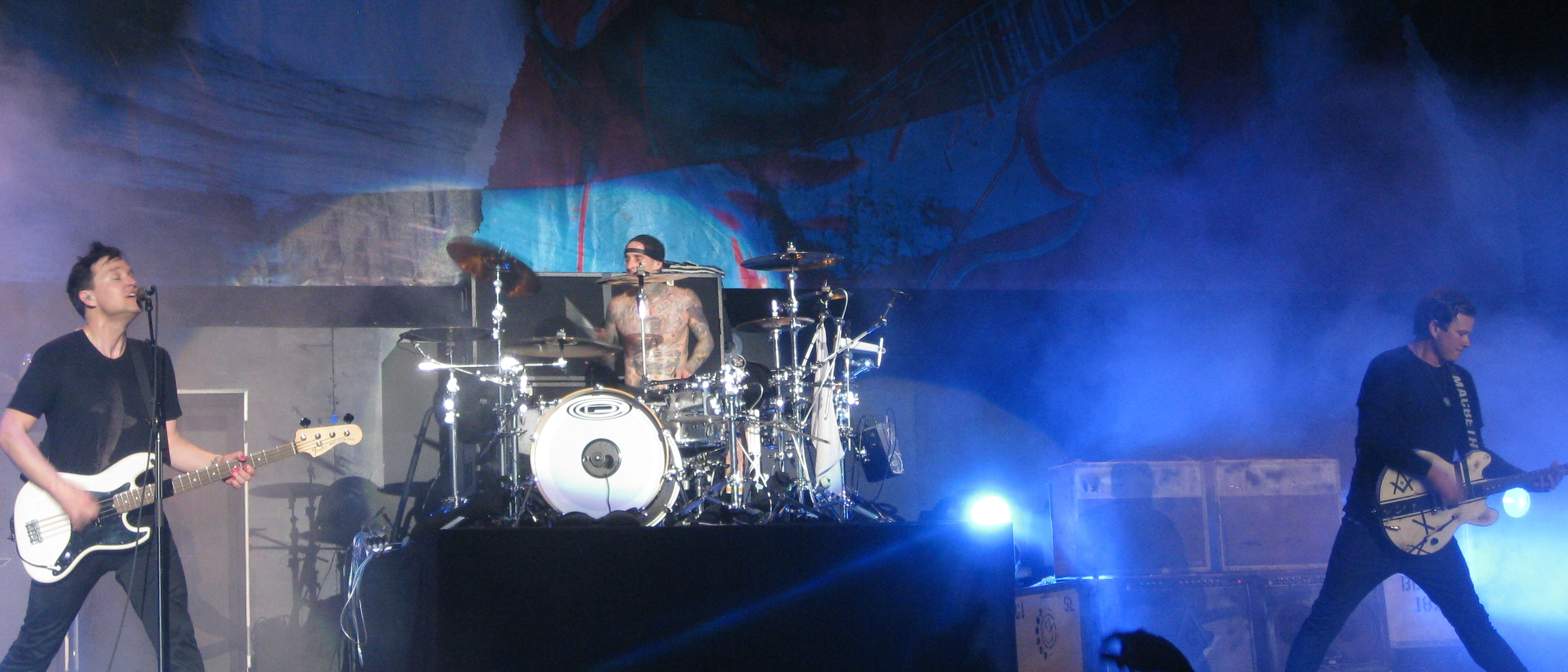
The reformed 2009–2015 lineup of Hoppus, Barker and DeLonge recorded the album Neighborhoods (2011) and the EP Dogs Eating Dogs (2012).

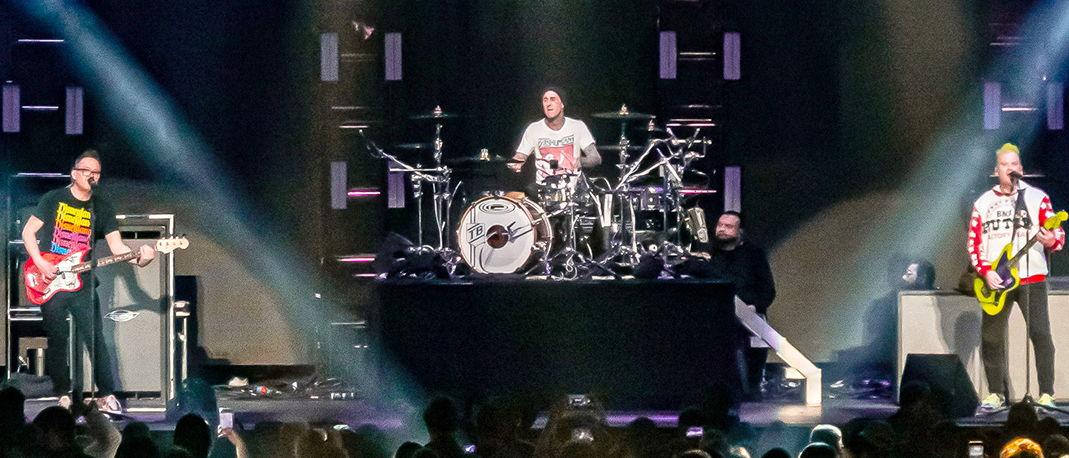
The 2015–2020 lineup of Hoppus, Barker and Matt Skiba recorded the albums California (2016) and Nine (2019), the single "Not Another Christmas Song" (2019), and featured on several singles.

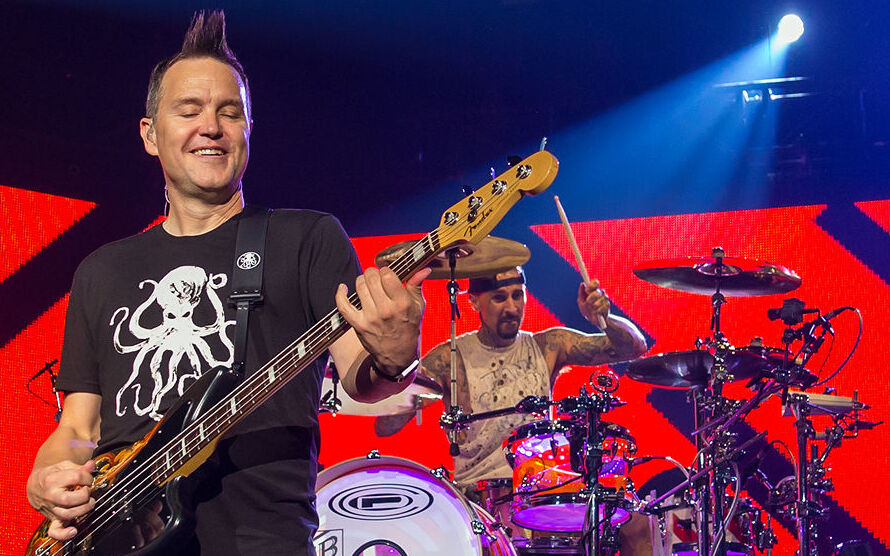
During the COVID-19 pandemic, Hoppus and Barker recorded the song "Quarantine" (2020).

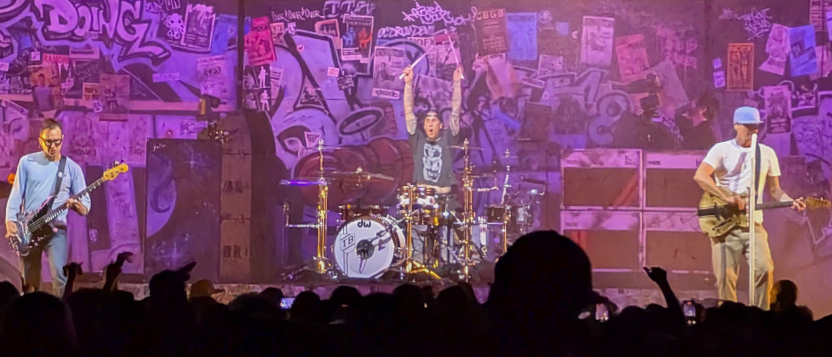
The reunited lineup since 2022 of Hoppus, Barker and DeLonge recorded the album One More Time... (2023) and its deluxe version One More Time... Part-2 (2024).

The American rock band Blink-182 has recorded songs for nine studio albums, as well as numerous extended plays. This list comprises the band's recorded catalog, as well as live renditions, early demo tracks, and recorded appearances on other albums. Blink-182 formed in Poway, a suburb of San Diego, California in 1992. The trio consists of bassist and vocalist Mark Hoppus, drummer Travis Barker, and guitarist and vocalist Tom DeLonge. The band is considered a key group in the development of pop punk music; their combination of pop melodies with fast-paced punk rock featured a more radio-friendly accessibility than prior bands. The group, with original drummer Scott Raynor, emerged from the Southern California punk scene of the early 1990s and first gained notoriety for high-energy live shows and irreverent lyrical toilet humor.

The band were initially known as Blink until an Irish techno band threatened legal action; they appended "-182" randomly. However, the band proceeded to make up many reasons for the number, such as the number of times Al Pacino said the word 'fuck' in the 1983 film Scarface, Mark Hoppus' goal weight, and others. Cheshire Cat (1995) led the band to tour with Pennywise and NOFX on the Warped Tour. Dude Ranch (1997) was co-distributed by major label MCA Records and featured their first rock radio hit, "Dammit". Raynor was fired midway through a 1998 tour and replaced by Barker. Enema of the State (1999) was an enormous success on the strength of hit singles "What's My Age Again?" and "All the Small Things", which became airplay and MTV staples. Take Off Your Pants and Jacket (2001) reached number 1 in the United States, Canada, and Germany. The eponymously titled Blink-182 followed in 2003 and marked a stylistic shift for the group, infusing experimental elements into their usual pop punk formula, resulting in a more mature sound. DeLonge left the group in 2005, sending the band into what was termed an "indefinite hiatus."

The trio reunited in 2009 and their sixth studio album, Neighborhoods, consisting of their characteristic sound and the band member's different music tastes, was released in 2011 through Interscope to modest success and generally positive reviews, reaching number two on the Billboard 200. The band departed Interscope the next year. In November 2012, the group would record the Dogs Eating Dogs EP, released independently a month after. Tension would grow between the trio as new material was planned to be recorded but due to DeLonge's side projects kept delaying dates, he would quit the band afterwards. Hoppus and Barker recruited Alkaline Trio frontman Matt Skiba to fill in for DeLonge to perform two club shows and a slot at the Musink Tattoo Convention & Music Festival in March 2015. After legal battles with DeLonge were worked out, Skiba, who returned to Alkaline Trio for a string of dates and the release of his side project the Sekrets, rejoined Blink-182 as an official member. Between January and March 2016, the new line-up consisting of Hoppus, Barker and Skiba recorded California, produced by John Feldmann for its release in July on independent service BMG to mixed to positive reviews. The album included, for a first time, outside songwriters, the likes of Patrick Stump of Fall Out Boy. It also marked their second number-one album in over 15 years, thus becoming their first to top the charts in the United Kingdom and receiving a Grammy nomination for the Best Rock Album award. After touring in support of the album, recording process began developing for the following record.

The trio moved to major label Columbia for their eighth album Nine, released on September 20, 2019 to generally positive reviews, who complimented the band's upgrade signature sound, as well as its moody lyrical content. Produced by Feldmann, also utilizing outside producers/songwriters including Captain Cuts, the Futuristics, and Tim Pagnotta. It debuted at number three on the Billboard 200 domestically and reached top ten in Canada, Austria, Germany and the United Kingdom. In October 2022, DeLonge returned to the band after almost eight years with a new single, "Edging", on October 14, 2022 and their ninth album One More Time... was released on October 20, 2023. Blink-182 has sold over 50 million albums worldwide.

== Songs ==
=== As lead artist ===
Keydan
†	Indicates single release
#	Indicates promotional single release
‡	Indicates songs covered by Blink-182

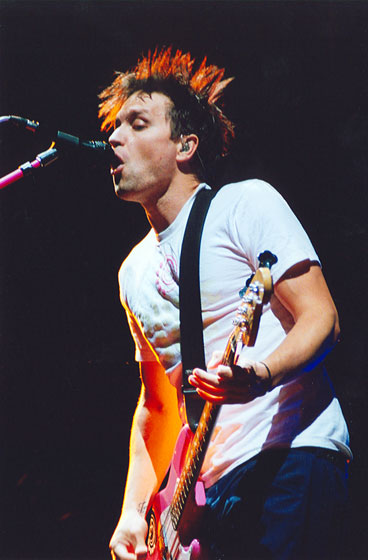
Mark Hoppus shares co-lead vocals and plays bass guitar for the group.

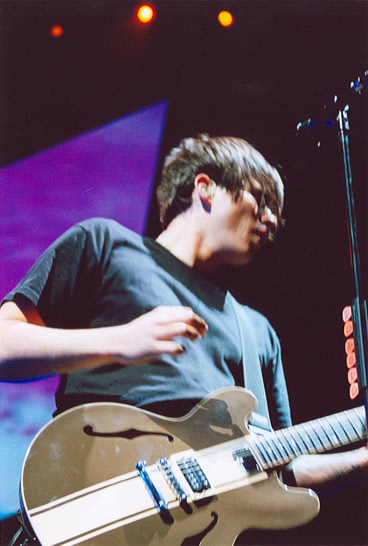
Tom DeLonge has shared co-lead vocals and played guitar for the group except between 2015 and 2022.

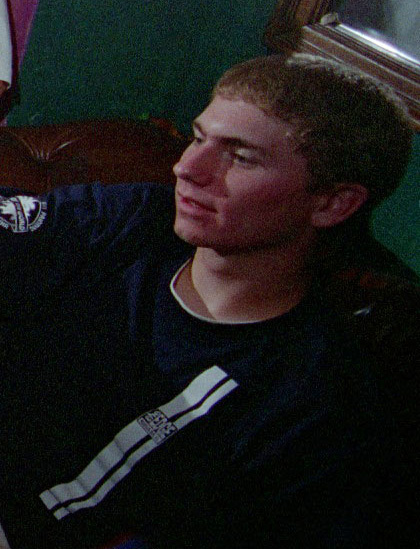
Scott Raynor played drums for the group between 1992 and 1998.

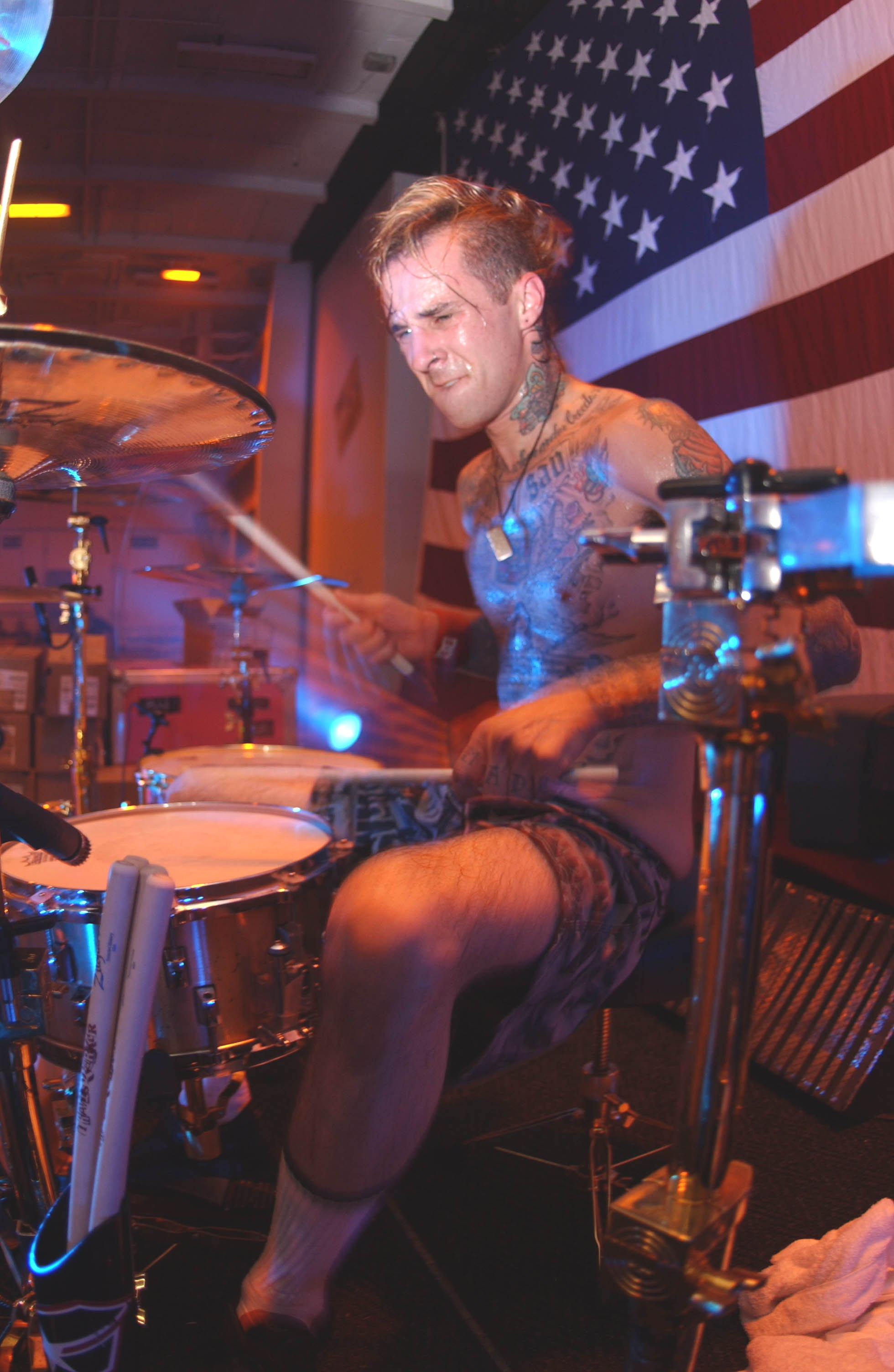
Travis Barker began playing drums for the group in 1998.

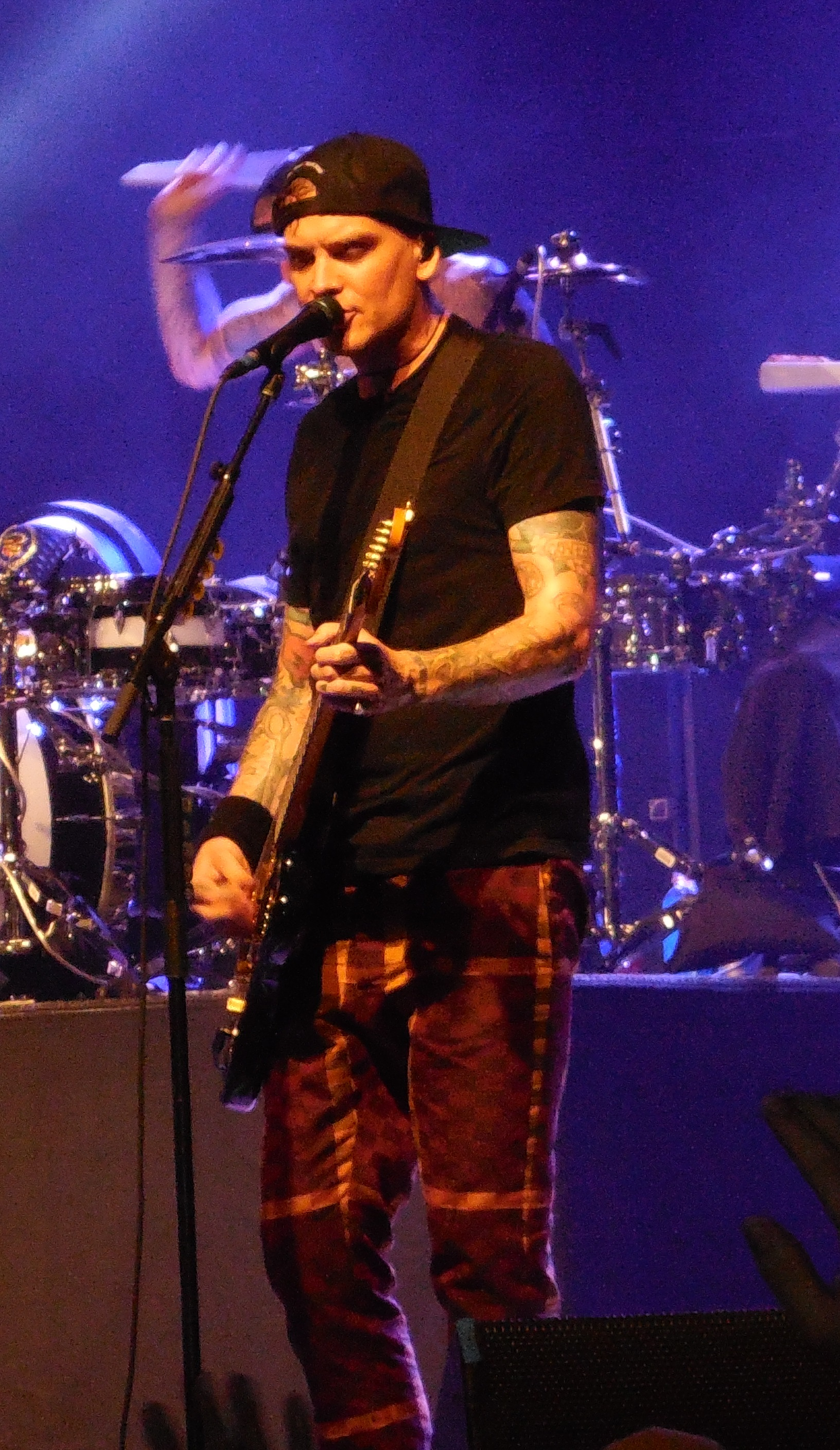
Matt Skiba shared co-lead vocals and played guitar for the group from 2015 to 2022.

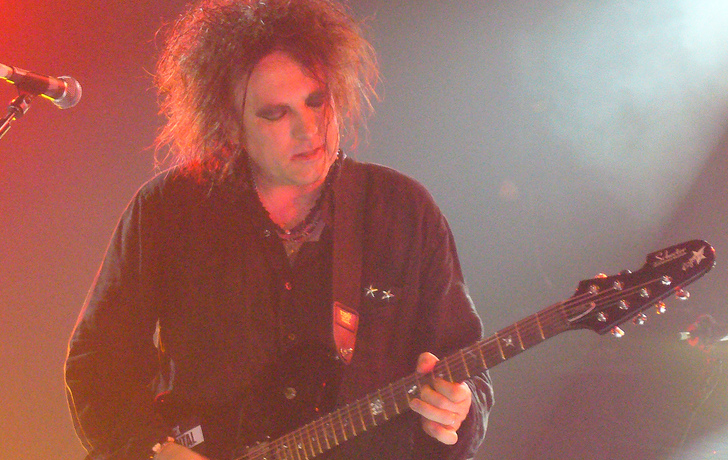
Robert Smith, frontman of the Cure, contributed vocals to "All of This" in 2003 and co-composed "Fell in Love" in 2023.

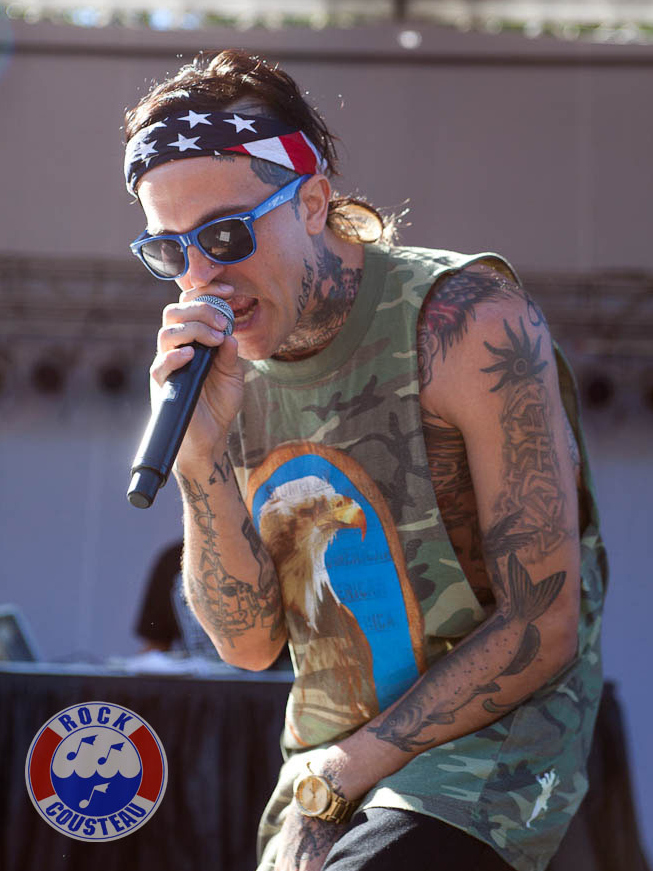
Yelawolf contributed vocals to "Pretty Little Girl" in 2012.

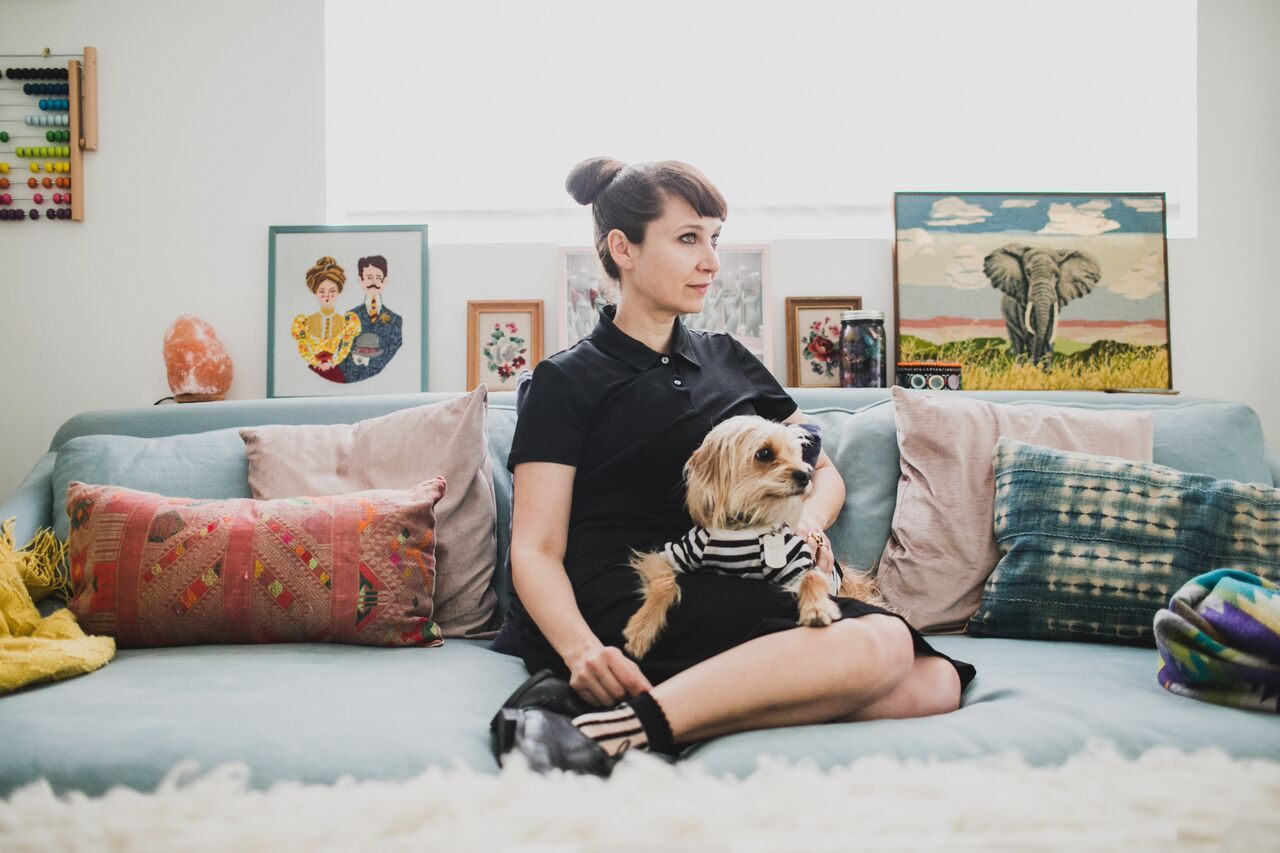
Singer-songwriter Simon Wilcox is credited with songwriting and backing vocals on "Bottom of the Ocean", from the deluxe edition of California (2017).

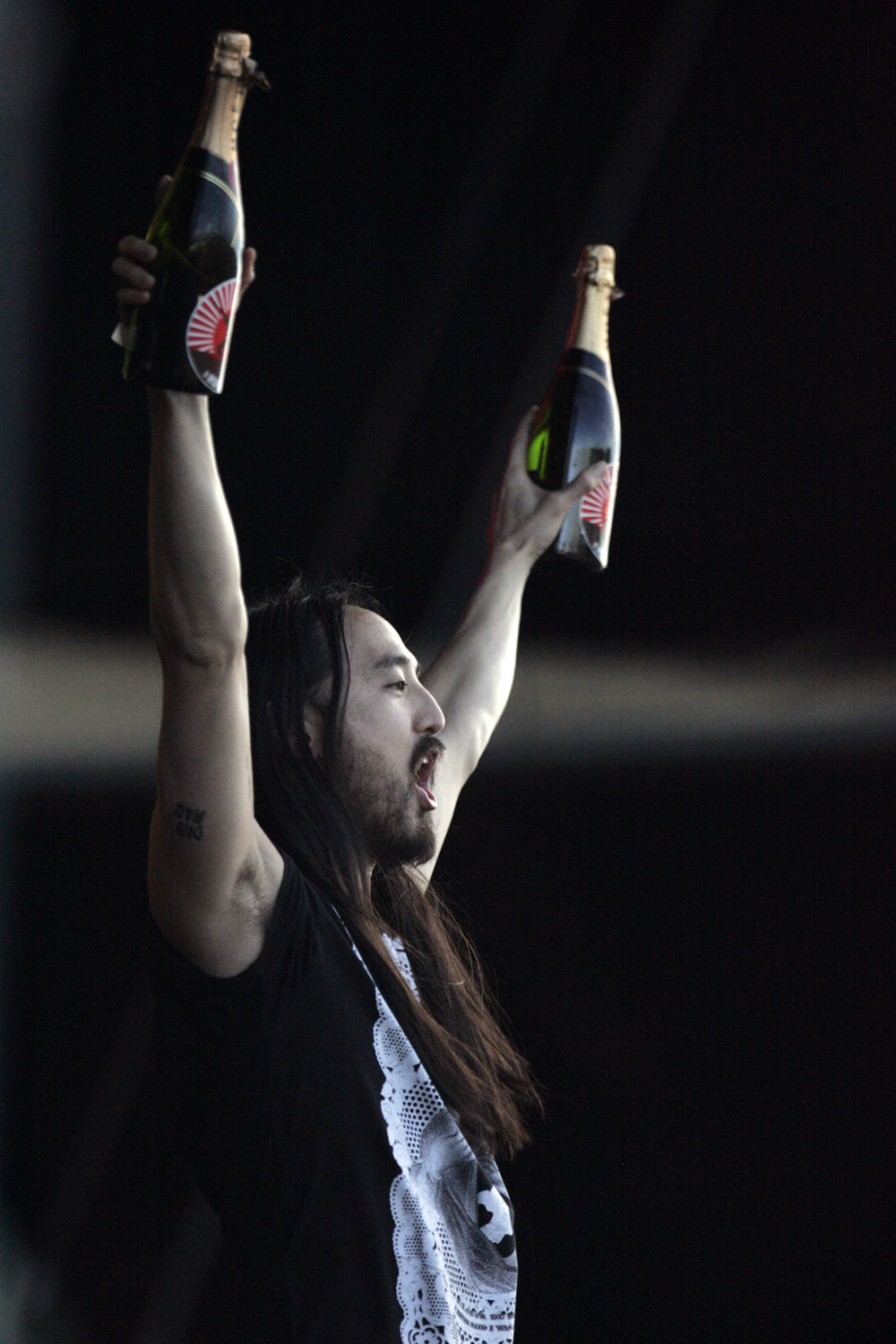
The band collaborated with DJ and producer Steve Aoki, pictured above, for "Why Are We So Broken", in 2018.

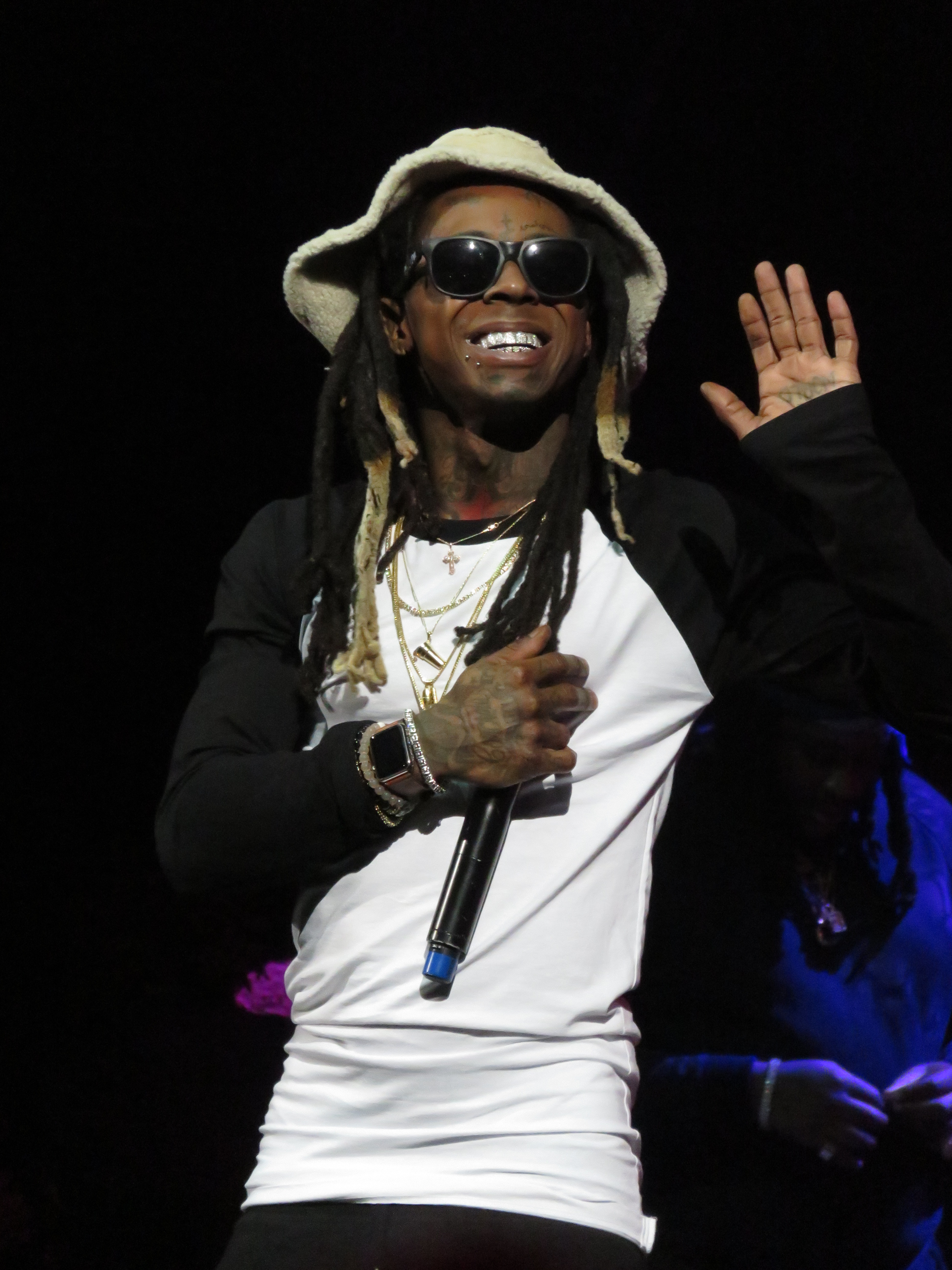
In 2019, the band created a mashup with rapper Lil Wayne.

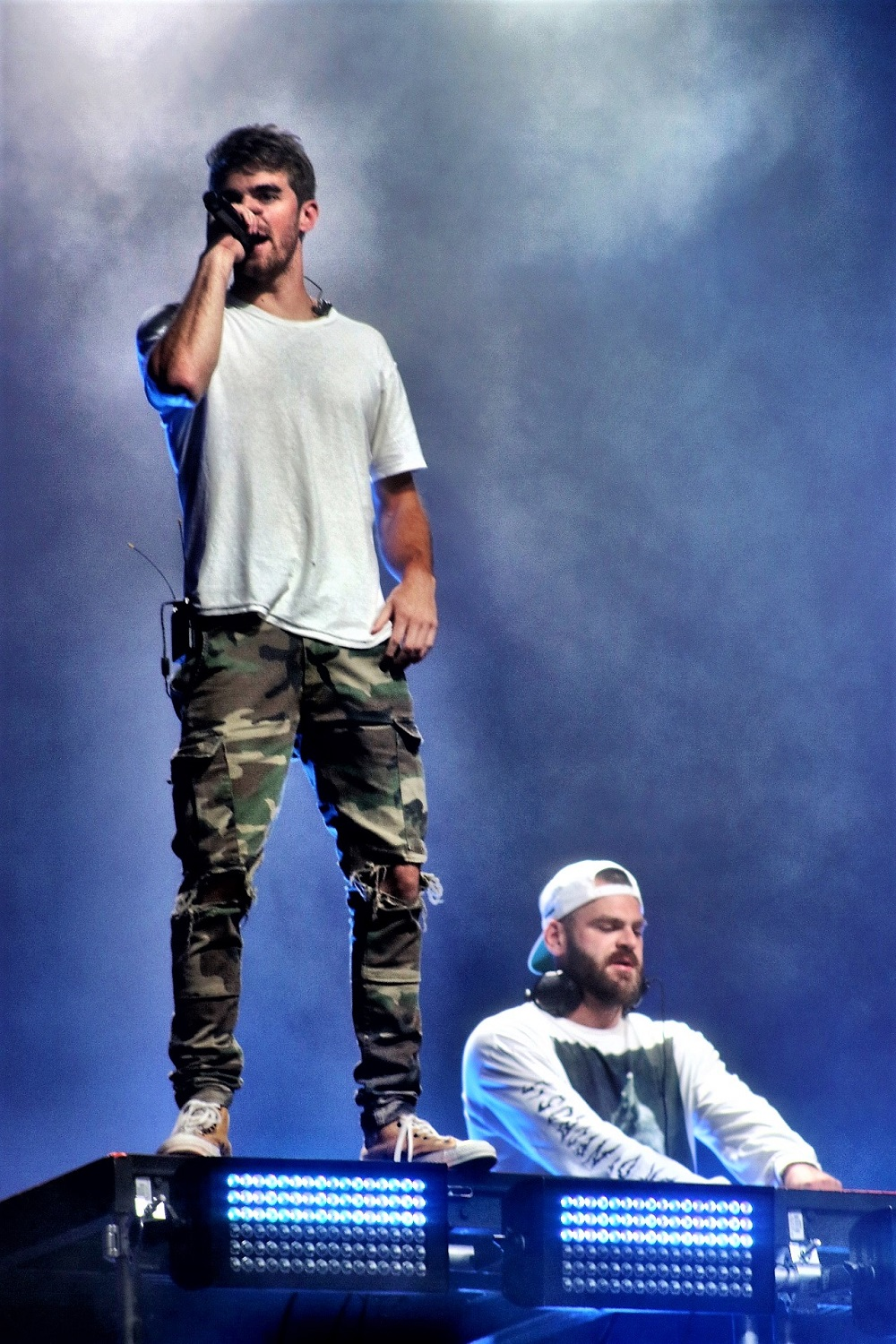
The band collaborated with DJ duo the Chainsmokers for the single "P.S. I Hope You're Happy" in 2019.

Name of song, originating album, and year released.
Song	Year	Album	Lead vocal(s)	Ref.
"6/8"	2017	California (Deluxe Edition)	Mark Hoppus; Matt Skiba	
"13 Miles"	2000	The Mark, Tom, and Travis Show (Japanese Edition) (Note: "13 Miles" also appears on the "Man Overboard" single.)	Mark Hoppus	
"21 Days"	1994	Buddha	Tom DeLonge	
"A New Hope" (Note: An early version of "A New Hope", titled "Princess Leia", is unreleased and can be found online.)	1997	Dude Ranch	Mark Hoppus	
"Adam's Song" †	1999	Enema of the State	Mark Hoppus	
"After Midnight" †	2011	Neighborhoods	Tom DeLonge; Mark Hoppus	
"Aliens Exist"	1999	Enema of the State	Tom DeLonge	
"All of This"	2003	Blink-182	Robert Smith; Tom DeLonge	
"All in My Head" †	2024	One More Time... Part-2	Mark Hoppus; Tom DeLonge	
"All the Small Things" †	1999	Enema of the State	Tom DeLonge	
"Alone"	1993	Flyswatter	Tom DeLonge	
"Always" †	2003	Blink-182	Tom DeLonge	
"Another Girl, Another Planet" # ‡ (The Only Ones cover)	2005	Greatest Hits	Mark Hoppus	
"Anthem"	1999	Enema of the State	Tom DeLonge	
"Anthem Part Two"	2001	Take Off Your Pants and Jacket	Tom DeLonge	
"Anthem Part 3"	2023	One More Time...	Tom DeLonge; Mark Hoppus	
"Apple Shampoo" †	1997	Dude Ranch	Mark Hoppus	
"Asthenia"	2003	Blink-182	Tom DeLonge	
"Bad News"	2023	One More Time...	Mark Hoppus	
"Ben Wah Balls"	1995	Cheshire Cat	Tom DeLonge	
"Better Days"	1993	21 Days	Tom DeLonge	
"Black Rain"	2019	Nine	Mark Hoppus; Matt Skiba	
"Blame It on My Youth" †	2019	Nine	Mark Hoppus; Matt Skiba	
"Blink Wave"	2023	One More Time...	Mark Hoppus; Tom DeLonge	
"Blow Job"	2000	The Mark, Tom, and Travis Show	Tom DeLonge	
"Boring"	1997	Dude Ranch	Tom DeLonge	
"Bored to Death" †	2016	California	Mark Hoppus; Matt Skiba	
"Bored to Death (Acoustic)"	2017	California (Deluxe Edition)	Mark Hoppus; Matt Skiba	
"Bottom of the Ocean"	2017	California (Deluxe Edition)	Mark Hoppus; Matt Skiba	
"Boxing Day"	2012	Dogs Eating Dogs	Tom DeLonge; Mark Hoppus	
"Brohemian Rhapsody"	2016	California	Mark Hoppus	
"Built This Pool" #	2016	California	Mark Hoppus	
"Cacophony"	1995	Cheshire Cat	Mark Hoppus	
"California"	2016	California	Mark Hoppus; Matt Skiba	
"Can't Get You More Pregnant" (Note: A second version of "Can't Get You More Pregnant", labeled the "Party Mix", was released in July 2018.) #	2017	California (Deluxe Edition)	Mark Hoppus	
"Can't Go Back"	2024	One More Time... Part-2	Mark Hoppus; Tom DeLonge	
"Carousel"	1994	Buddha	Tom DeLonge	
"Childhood"	2023	One More Time...	Mark Hoppus; Tom DeLonge	
"The Country Song" (Note: An alternative version entitled “Dog Lapping” appears on advance copies of Dude Ranch.)	2000	The Mark, Tom, and Travis Show	Tom DeLonge	
"Cut Me Off"	2023	One More Time... (Digital Exclusive Edition)	Tom DeLonge; Mark Hoppus	
"Cynical"	2016	California	Mark Hoppus; Matt Skiba	
"Dammit" †	1997	Dude Ranch	Mark Hoppus	
"Dance with Me" †	2023	One More Time...	Tom DeLonge; Mark Hoppus	
"Dancing with Myself" ‡ (Generation X cover)	1997	Before You Were Punk	Tom DeLonge	
"Darkside" †	2019	Nine	Mark Hoppus; Matt Skiba	
"Dead Man's Curve" ‡ (Jan and Dean cover)	1999	Shake, Rattle and Roll: An American Love Story	Tom DeLonge; Mark Hoppus	
"Degenerate"	1993	21 Days	Tom DeLonge	
"Depends"	1995	Cheshire Cat	Tom DeLonge; Mark Hoppus	
"Dick Lips" †	1997	Dude Ranch	Tom DeLonge	
"Disaster"	2012	Dogs Eating Dogs	Mark Hoppus; Tom DeLonge	
"Does My Breath Smell?"	1994	Short Bus	Tom DeLonge	
"Dogs Eating Dogs"	2012	Dogs Eating Dogs	Mark Hoppus; Tom DeLonge	
"Don't"	1998	Buddha (Reissue)	Mark Hoppus	
"Don't Leave Me"	1999	Enema of the State	Mark Hoppus	
"Don't Mean Anything"	2017	California (Deluxe Edition)	Mark Hoppus; Matt Skiba	
"Don't Tell Me It's Over"	2001	Take Off Your Pants and Jacket (Green Edition)	Tom DeLonge	
"Down" †	2003	Blink-182	Tom DeLonge; Mark Hoppus	
"Dumpweed" #	1999	Enema of the State	Tom DeLonge	
"Dysentery Gary"	1999	Enema of the State	Tom DeLonge; Mark Hoppus	
"Easy Target"	2003	Blink-182	Tom DeLonge; Mark Hoppus	
"Edging" †	2022	One More Time...	Tom DeLonge; Mark Hoppus	
"Emo"	1997	Dude Ranch	Mark Hoppus	
"Enthused" (Note: A demo version is available on the "Wasting Time" single.)	1997	Dude Ranch	Tom DeLonge	
"Even If She Falls"	2011	Neighborhoods (Deluxe Edition)	Tom DeLonge	
"Everyone Everywhere"	2024	One More Time... Part-2	Tom DeLonge; Mark Hoppus	
"Every Other Weekend"	2024	One More Time... Part-2	Mark Hoppus; Tom DeLonge	
"Every Time I Look for You"	2001	Take Off Your Pants and Jacket	Mark Hoppus	
"The Fallen Interlude"	2003	Blink-182	Menno	
"The Family Next Door" (Note: "The Family Next Door" was excluded from the reissue of Buddha in 1998. It is only available on the original demo cassette.)	1994	Buddha	Tom DeLonge; Mark Hoppus	
"Family Reunion" #	1999	Short Music for Short People	Mark Hoppus	
"Feeling This" †	2003	Blink-182	Tom DeLonge; Mark Hoppus	
"Fell in Love" †	2023	One More Time...	Tom DeLonge; Mark Hoppus	
"Fentoozler"	1994	Buddha	Mark Hoppus	
"Fighting the Gravity"	2011	Neighborhoods (Deluxe Edition)	Mark Hoppus	
"First Date" †	2001	Take Off Your Pants and Jacket	Tom DeLonge	
"The First Time"	2019	Nine	Mark Hoppus; Matt Skiba	
"Freak Scene" ‡ (Dinosaur Jr. cover)	1993	Flyswatter	Mark Hoppus	
"Fuck a Dog"	2001	Take Off Your Pants and Jacket (Yellow Edition)	Tom DeLonge; Mark Hoppus	
"Fuck Face"	2023	One More Time...	Travis Barker; Tom DeLonge	
"Generational Divide" †	2019	Nine	Mark Hoppus; Matt Skiba	
"Ghost on the Dance Floor"	2011	Neighborhoods	Tom DeLonge	
"The Girl Next Door" ‡ (Screeching Weasel cover)	1998	Buddha (Reissue)	Mark Hoppus	
"Give Me One Good Reason"	2001	Take Off Your Pants and Jacket	Tom DeLonge	
"Go"	2003	Blink-182	Mark Hoppus	
"Going Away to College"	1999	Enema of the State	Mark Hoppus	
"Good Old Days"	2017	California (Deluxe Edition)	Mark Hoppus	
"Good Times" ‡ (Good Times theme cover)	1998	None (Note: "Good Times" only appears on the "Apple Shampoo" single.)	Mark Hoppus	
"Happy Days" †	2019	Nine	Mark Hoppus	
"Happy Holidays, You Bastard"	2001	Take Off Your Pants and Jacket	Mark Hoppus	
"Heart's All Gone"	2011	Neighborhoods	Mark Hoppus	
"Heart's All Gone Interlude"	2011	Neighborhoods (Deluxe Edition)	Instrumental	
"Heaven"	2019	Nine	Mark Hoppus; Matt Skiba	
"Here's Your Letter"	2003	Blink-182	Mark Hoppus	
"Hey I'm Sorry"	2017	California (Deluxe Edition)	Mark Hoppus; Matt Skiba	
"Home Is Such a Lonely Place" †	2016	California	Mark Hoppus; Matt Skiba	
"Hungover You"	2019	Nine	Mark Hoppus; Matt Skiba	
"Hurt (Interlude)"	2023	One More Time...	Tom DeLonge	
"If You Never Left"	2024	One More Time... Part-2	Mark Hoppus; Tom DeLonge	
"I Miss You" †	2003	Blink-182	Mark Hoppus; Tom DeLonge	
"I Really Wish I Hated You" †	2019	Nine	Mark Hoppus; Matt Skiba	
"I Won't Be Home for Christmas" † (Note: "I Won't Be Home for Christmas" was first released as a promotional single in 1997, and re-released as a single in 2001.)	1997	None	Mark Hoppus	
"I'm Lost Without You"	2003	Blink-182	Tom DeLonge	
"I'm Sorry"	1997	Dude Ranch	Tom DeLonge	
"Josie" †	1997	Dude Ranch	Mark Hoppus	
"Just About Done"	1995	Cheshire Cat	Tom DeLonge; Mark Hoppus	
"Kaleidoscope"	2011	Neighborhoods	Mark Hoppus; Tom DeLonge	
"Kings of the Weekend"	2016	California	Mark Hoppus; Matt Skiba	
"Last Train Home"	2017	California (Deluxe Edition)	Mark Hoppus; Matt Skiba	
"Left Alone"	2016	California	Mark Hoppus; Matt Skiba	
"Lemmings"	1996	Lemmings / Going Nowhere	Mark Hoppus	
"The Longest Line" ‡ (NOFX cover)	1993	Flyswatter	Mark Hoppus	
"Long Lost Feeling"	2017	California (Deluxe Edition)	Mark Hoppus; Matt Skiba	
"Los Angeles"	2016	California	Matt Skiba; Mark Hoppus	
"Love Is Dangerous"	2011	Neighborhoods	Tom DeLonge	
"Lunch"	1993	21 Days	Tom DeLonge	
"M+M's" †	1995	Cheshire Cat	Mark Hoppus	
"Man Overboard" †	2000	The Mark, Tom, and Travis Show	Mark Hoppus; Tom DeLonge	
"Marlboro Man"	1993	Flyswatter	Tom DeLonge	
"MH 4.18.2011"	2011	Neighborhoods	Mark Hoppus	
"Misery" #	2017	California (Deluxe Edition)	Mark Hoppus; Matt Skiba	
"Mother's Day"	2001	Take Off Your Pants and Jacket (Red Edition)	Mark Hoppus	
"More Than You Know" †	2023	One More Time...	Mark Hoppus; Tom DeLonge	
"Mutt"	1999	Enema of the State	Tom DeLonge	
"My Pet Sally"	1993	21 Days	Tom DeLonge	
"Natives"	2011	Neighborhoods	Tom DeLonge; Mark Hoppus	
"Nipples of Fury"	1993	21 Days	Tom DeLonge	
"No Fun" †	2024	One More Time... Part-2	Tom DeLonge	
"No Future" #	2016	California	Mark Hoppus; Matt Skiba	
"No Heart to Speak Of"	2019	Nine	Mark Hoppus; Matt Skiba	
"Not Another Christmas Song" †	2019	None (Note: "Not Another Christmas Song" was released as a standalone single in 2019.)	Mark Hoppus; Matt Skiba	
"Not Now" †	2005	Greatest Hits	Tom DeLonge	
"Obvious"	2003	Blink-182	Tom DeLonge	
"Online Songs"	2001	Take Off Your Pants and Jacket	Mark Hoppus	
"One More Time" †	2023	One More Time...	Tom DeLonge; Mark Hoppus; Travis Barker	
"One Night Stand"	2024	One More Time... Part-2	Tom DeLonge; Mark Hoppus	
"On Some Emo Shit"	2019	Nine	Mark Hoppus; Matt Skiba	
"The Only Thing That Matters"	2016	California	Mark Hoppus; Matt Skiba	
"Other Side"	2023	One More Time...	Mark Hoppus	
"Out of My Head"	2019	Nine (Japanese Edition)	Mark Hoppus; Matt Skiba	
"Parking Lot" #	2017	California (Deluxe Edition)	Mark Hoppus; Matt Skiba	
"The Party Song"	1999	Enema of the State	Mark Hoppus	
"Pathetic"	1997	Dude Ranch	Mark Hoppus; Tom DeLonge	
"Peggy Sue"	1995	Cheshire Cat	Tom DeLonge	
"Pin the Grenade"	2019	Nine	Mark Hoppus; Matt Skiba	
"Please Take Me Home"	2001	Take Off Your Pants and Jacket	Tom DeLonge	
"Point of View"	1993	Flyswatter	Tom DeLonge	
"Pretty Little Girl"	2012	Dogs Eating Dogs	Tom DeLonge; Yelawolf	
"Quarantine" †	2020	None	Mark Hoppus	
"Rabbit Hole" #	2016	California	Mark Hoppus; Matt Skiba	
"Ransom"	2019	Nine	Mark Hoppus; Matt Skiba	
"Reckless Abandon"	2001	Take Off Your Pants and Jacket	Tom DeLonge	
"Red Skies"	1993	Flyswatter	Tom DeLonge	
"Reebok Commercial"	1993	Flyswatter	Mark Hoppus	
"Remember to Forget Me"	2019	Nine	Mark Hoppus; Matt Skiba	
"The Rock Show" †	2001	Take Off Your Pants and Jacket	Mark Hoppus	
"Roller Coaster"	2001	Take Off Your Pants and Jacket	Mark Hoppus	
"Romeo and Rebecca"	1993	21 Days	Tom DeLonge	
"Run Away"	2019	Nine	Mark Hoppus; Matt Skiba	
"San Diego"	2016	California	Mark Hoppus; Matt Skiba	
"See You"	2023	One More Time... (Digital Exclusive Edition)	Tom DeLonge; Mark Hoppus	
"She's Out of Her Mind" †	2016	California	Mark Hoppus; Matt Skiba	
"Shut Up"	2001	Take Off Your Pants and Jacket	Mark Hoppus	
"Snake Charmer"	2011	Neighborhoods (Deluxe Edition)	Tom DeLonge	
"Sober"	2016	California	Mark Hoppus; Matt Skiba	
"Sometimes"	1993	21 Days	Mark Hoppus	
"Stay Together for the Kids" †	2001	Take Off Your Pants and Jacket	Mark Hoppus; Tom DeLonge	
"Stockholm Syndrome"	2003	Blink-182	Mark Hoppus	
"Stockholm Syndrome Interlude" (Note: Originally combined with "Violence", digital releases of Blink-182 list "Stockholm Syndrome Interlude" as its own track.)	2003	Blink-182	Joanne Whalley	
"Story of a Lonely Guy"	2001	Take Off Your Pants and Jacket	Tom DeLonge	
"Strings"	1994	Buddha	Mark Hoppus	
"Take Me In"	2024	One More Time... Part-2	Tom DeLonge; Mark Hoppus	
"Teenage Satellites"	2016	California	Mark Hoppus; Matt Skiba	
"Terrified"	2023	One More Time...	Tom DeLonge	
"This Is Home"	2011	Neighborhoods	Tom DeLonge	
"Time"	1993	Flyswatter	Mark Hoppus	
"Time to Break Up"	2001	Take Off Your Pants and Jacket (Red Edition)	Tom DeLonge	
"Toast and Bananas"	1994	Buddha	Tom DeLonge	
"Touchdown Boy"	1995	Cheshire Cat	Tom DeLonge	
"Transvestite" (Note: "Transvestite" was excluded from a later reissue of Buddha in 1998. It is only available on the original demo cassette.)	1994	Buddha	Tom DeLonge; Mark Hoppus	
"Turn This Off!"	2023	One More Time...	Tom DeLonge; Mark Hoppus	
"Turpentine"	2023	One More Time...	Tom DeLonge; Mark Hoppus	
"TV"	1993	21 Days	Mark Hoppus	
"Untitled"	1997	Dude Ranch	Tom DeLonge	
"Up All Night" †	2011	Neighborhoods	Tom DeLonge; Mark Hoppus	
"Violence"	2003	Blink-182	Tom DeLonge	
"Voyeur"	1997	Dude Ranch	Tom DeLonge	
"Waggy"	1996	They Came to Conquer... Uranus	Mark Hoppus	
"Wasting Time" †	1994	Short Bus	Mark Hoppus	
"Wendy Clear"	1999	Enema of the State	Mark Hoppus	
"What Went Wrong?"	2001	Take Off Your Pants and Jacket (Yellow Edition)	Tom DeLonge	
"What's My Age Again?" †	1999	Enema of the State	Mark Hoppus	
"When I Was Young"	2012	Dogs Eating Dogs	Tom DeLonge	
"When We Were Young"	2023	One More Time...	Tom DeLonge; Mark Hoppus	
"When You Fucked Grandpa"	2001	Take Off Your Pants and Jacket (Green Edition)	Mark Hoppus	
"Wildfire" #	2017	California (Deluxe Edition)	Mark Hoppus; Matt Skiba	
"Wishing Well" #	2011	Neighborhoods	Tom DeLonge	
"Wrecked Him"	1996	They Came to Conquer... Uranus	Tom DeLonge	
"You Don't Know What You've Got" †	2023	One More Time...	Mark Hoppus; Tom DeLonge	
"Zulu"	1996	They Came to Conquer... Uranus	Tom DeLonge	

=== As featured artist ===
Name of song, originating album, and year released.
Song	Artist	Year	Album	Ref.
"Death Bed" (Bonus Remix) (Note: "Death Bed" is featured on rapper Powfu's 2020 extended play, Poems of the Past.)	Powfu and Beabadoobee	2020	Poems of the Past	
"It's All Fading to Black" (Note: "It's All Fading to Black" is featured on rapper XXXTentacion's final studio album, Bad Vibes Forever (2019).)	XXXTentacion	2019	Bad Vibes Forever	
"Let Me Down" †	Oliver Tree	2020	None	
"P.S. I Hope You're Happy" (Note: "P.S. I Hope You're Happy" is featured on DJ and production duo the Chainsmokers's third studio album, World War Joy (2019).) †	The Chainsmokers	2019	World War Joy	
"Scumbag" †	Goody Grace	2019	None	
"What's My Age Again?/A Milli" (Note: "What's My Age Again?/A Milli", a mashup of the band's 1999 song and Lil Wayne's 2008 hit "A Milli", was released as a standalone single in 2019.) †	Lil Wayne and Blink-182	2019	None	
"Why Are We So Broken" (Note: "Why Are We So Broken" is featured on DJ and producer Steve Aoki's fifth studio album, Neon Future III (2018).) †	Steve Aoki	2018	Neon Future III	

=== Unreleased songs ===
Name of song, originating album, and year released.
Song	Year	Album	Lead vocal(s)	Ref.
"Falling" (Note: This song is a demo that leaked in 2020 from the Nine sessions.)	2019	None	Mark Hoppus; Matt Skiba	
"I Really Wish I Hated You" (featuring Miley Cyrus) (Note: This is an unreleased version of the song, recorded during the Nine sessions. It was leaked in 2020.)	2019	None	Mark Hoppus; Matt Skiba; Miley Cyrus	
"Life's So Boring" (Note: "Life's So Boring" is one of the few unreleased songs by the group. Hoppus spoke on the song's existence in a 2000 interview: "It [was] a cool song, I just couldn't think of any lyrics for it at all — it just sounded really contrived.")	1999	None	Instrumental	
"Love's Not Pretty" (Note: This song is a demo that leaked in 2023 from the post- Nine sessions.)	2020	None	Mark Hoppus; Matt Skiba	
"Punk Kid" (Note: This song was recorded during the blink-182 sessions. It was briefly heard in the documentary of the album.)	2003	None	Mark Hoppus	
"Same As It Ever Was" (Note: This song is a demo from the post- Nine sessions. An EDM remix of this song was fully leaked.)	2020	None	Mark Hoppus; Matt Skiba	
"The Start/Here We Are" (Note: This song is a demo that fully leaked in 2024 from the post- Nine sessions.)	2020	None	Mark Hoppus; Matt Skiba	
"Voyeur" (Note: "Voyeur" is an unreleased demo that can be found online; it is entirely different to the Dude Ranch song of the same name.)	1994	None	Tom DeLonge	

== See also ==
- Blink-182 discography
