= Icon (Blink-182 album) =

Greatest hits album by Blink-182
- Released: March 19, 2013
- Recorded: 1997–2003
- Genre: Pop-punk; punk rock; skate punk; alternative rock
- Length: 35:10
- Label: Geffen; UM
- Producer: Mark Trombino; Jerry Finn

Blink-182 chronology
Dogs Eating Dogs (2012)	Icon (2013)	California (2016)

Icon is the second greatest hits album from the American rock band Blink-182, released on March 29, 2013. Icon was released following the band's departure from Interscope Records in 2012 and compiles the band's biggest singles, covering material from Dude Ranch (1997) to Blink-182 (2003).

== Background ==
Icon is the band's second greatest hits collection. The album was part of the Icon series launched by Universal Music Enterprises, which features greatest hits releases from "major artists spanning rock, pop, R&B and country." The front cover image is a photograph taken of the band by Estevan Oriol during a photo shoot for the band's eponymous sixth album in 2003.

== Reception ==
Professional ratings
Review scores
Source	Rating
Allmusic	4/5 stars

Allmusic reviewer Gregory Heaney called the collection a "crash course in pop-punk" that "takes listeners on a whirlwind tour of the band's back catalog while showing off an emotional range that was often masked by the band's youthful irreverence," while praising its simplicity and compact track listing, calling it a "best of the best-of."

== Track listing ==
No.	Title	Writer(s)	Original release	Length
1.	"All the Small Things" (single version)	Mark Hoppus, Tom DeLonge	Enema of the State (1999)	2:51
2.	"Josie" (single version)	Hoppus, DeLonge, Scott Raynor	Dude Ranch (1997)	3:06
3.	"Feeling This"	Hoppus, DeLonge, Travis Barker	Blink-182 (2003)	2:54
4.	"Adam's Song" (single version)	Hoppus, DeLonge	Enema of the State (1999)	4:07
5.	"Dammit" (single version)	Hoppus, DeLonge, Raynor	Dude Ranch (1997)	2:46
6.	"What's My Age Again?" (single version)	Hoppus, DeLonge	Enema of the State (1999)	2:28
7.	"The Rock Show"	Hoppus, DeLonge, Barker	Take Off Your Pants and Jacket (2001)	2:48
8.	"Down" (single version)	Hoppus, DeLonge, Barker	Blink-182 (2003)	3:12
9.	"First Date"	Hoppus, DeLonge, Barker	Take Off Your Pants and Jacket (2001)	2:51
10.	"Stay Together for the Kids"	Hoppus, DeLonge, Barker	Take Off Your Pants and Jacket (2001)	3:59
11.	"I Miss You"	Hoppus, DeLonge, Barker	Blink-182 (2003)	3:47
Total length:				35:10

== Personnel ==
Blink-182

- Tom DeLonge – vocals, guitars
- Mark Hoppus – vocals, bass guitar
- Travis Barker – drums on all other tracks
- Scott Raynor – drums on "Josie" and "Dammit"

Additional musicians

- Roger Joseph Manning Jr. – keyboards
- Scott Russo – backing vocals on "Josie"

Artwork

- Vartan – art direction
- Matt Diehl – design
- Ryan Null – director of photography
- Estevan Oriol – photography

Production

- Jerry Finn – production, mixing engineer of "Feeling This"
- Mark Trombino – production, mixing engineer and keyboards on "Dammit" and "Josie"
- Tom Lord-Alge – mixing engineer
- Jaime Feldman – compilation producer
- Laura Benanchietti – product manager
- Monique McGuffin Newman – production manager
- Erick Labson – mastering engineer
