= Scott Raynor =

American drummer (born 1978)

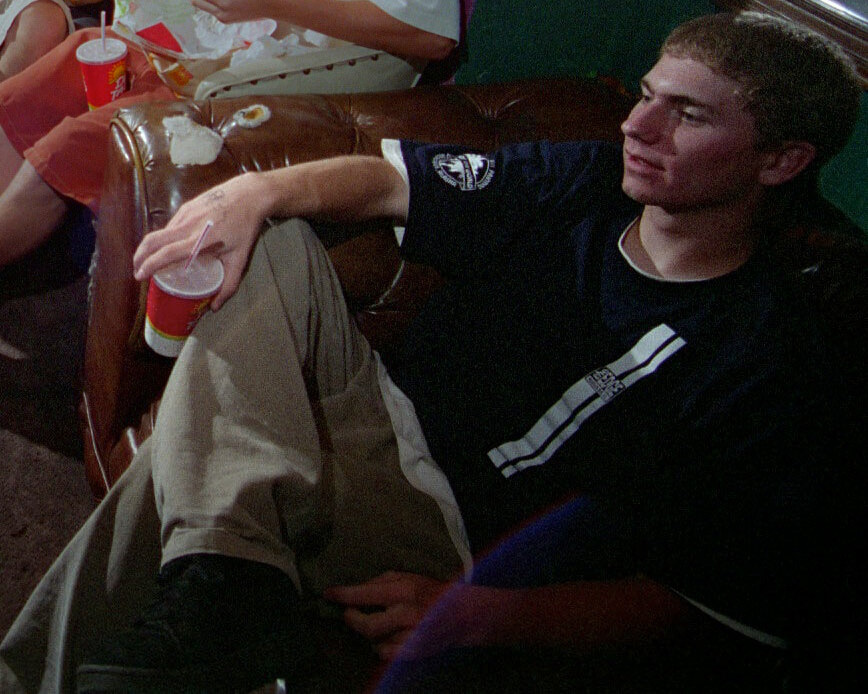
- Raynor in 1995

Background information
- Born: Scott William Raynor Jr. May 23, 1978 (age 48); Poway, California, U.S.
- Genres: Punk rock; skate punk; pop-punk
- Occupations: Musician; police officer
- Instruments: Drums; guitar
- Years active: 1992–2020
- Formerly of: Blink-182; One Track Mind; Grimbly; Death on Wednesday; Isinglass; Trailer Park Queen; Bastidas!; The Wraith

Scott William Raynor Jr. (born May 23, 1978) is an American former musician best known as a founding member and the original drummer of the band Blink-182. Born in Poway, California, Raynor first approached the drums in his preteens; he joined Blink-182 at only 14 years old, and played with the band for six years. With Raynor, the group recorded their first demo, Buddha (1994), their debut album, Cheshire Cat (1995), as well as the gold-certified Dude Ranch (1997). Raynor was dismissed from the group in 1998 and was replaced by Travis Barker.

Since then, Raynor has performed with a wide variety of groups, including post-punk band the Wraith, and contributed to the charity StandUp for Kids. As of 2023, he works as a police officer for San Diego Police Department.

== Life and career ==
Raynor began playing drums at a young age, forming a group with friend Ryan Kennedy at age 11 to perform at a school competition – "a kind of 'show and tell' thing," Raynor later recalled. The duo were initially inspired by Metallica, but found their material far too technical; they instead played "Twist of Cain" by Danzig and "London Dungeon" by the Misfits. Raynor's first legitimate performance consisted of a cover of "Vlad the Impaler" by Gwar.

=== Beginnings of music career ===
Raynor attended Rancho Bernardo High School (RBHS). RBHS often arranged Battle of the Bands competitions, and Raynor participated: his band, The Necropheliacs, played a cover of Metallica's "Creeping Death". While at the competition, new transfer student Tom DeLonge, who had been expelled from Poway High School for attending a basketball game while drunk, performed an original song titled "Who's Gonna Shave Your Back Tonight?" to a packed auditorium. Raynor was introduced to DeLonge at a party by Paul Scott, founding member of The Necropheliacs, shortly before he moved out of state. The two found they had plenty in common, and DeLonge was searching for a more permanent band to create music with. The two began writing songs at Raynor's parents' home – "a strange mix of metal and Descendents-style punk" – and tried out a variety of bass players, according to Raynor.

DeLonge later met Mark Hoppus in August 1992 through friend Kerry Key and his girlfriend, Anne Hoppus. "I thought they were hilarious when I met them. I mean, I didn't have a driver's license yet, so I gained a lot of agency through hanging with them and their group of friends," said Raynor. The trio began to practice in Raynor's room (amid complaints from neighbors), which was soundproofed with empty egg cartons.

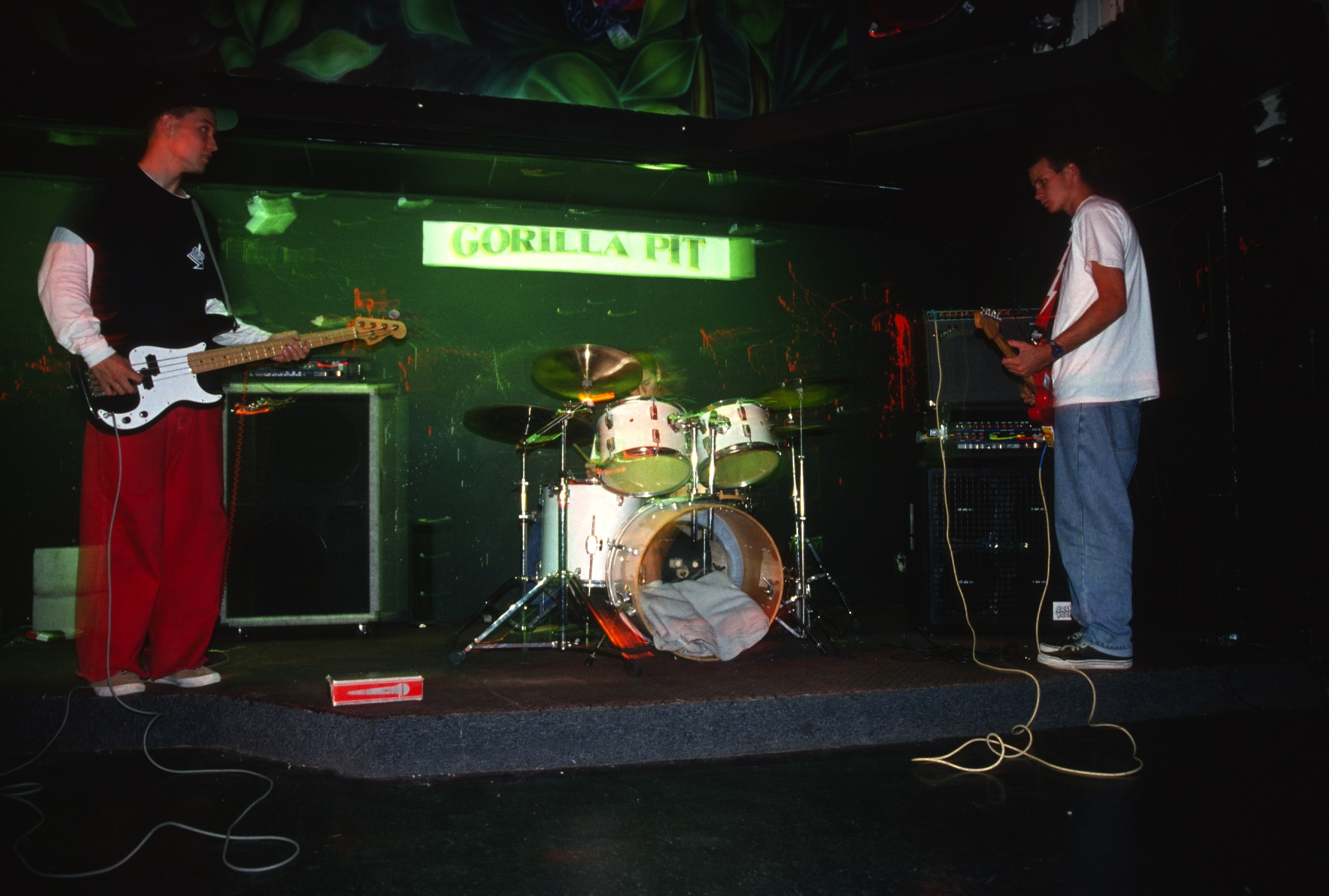
Blink at the Gorilla Pit in 1993

The trio spent time together constantly, attending punk shows and movies and playing practical jokes. The trio first operated under a variety of names, including Duck Tape and Figure 8, until DeLonge rechristened the band "Blink". Hoppus' girlfriend later led him to depart from the group for a time, but he returned when Raynor and DeLonge began recording a demo tape on a four track recorder with friend and collaborator Cam Jones. The band soon became part of a circuit that also included the likes of Ten Foot Pole and Unwritten Law, and they found their way onto the bill as the opening band for local acts at SOMA, a local all-ages venue which they longed to headline. "It's difficult to describe, in words, the nauseous mix of fear and excitement that would hit me when I first started seeing lines of people wanting to hear us play," said Raynor.

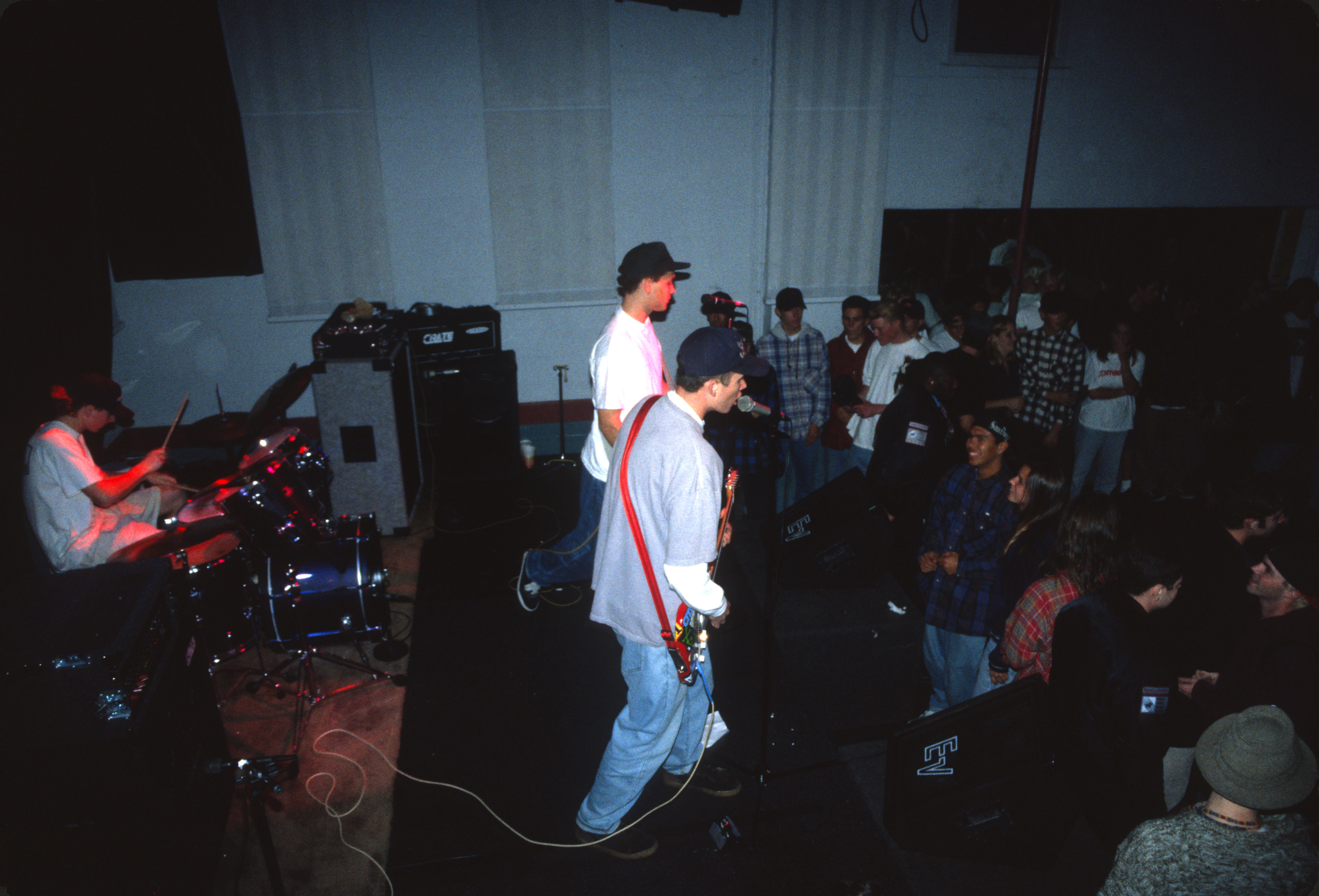
An early Blink-182 show at the Soul Kitchen in El Cajon

The three eventually were playing concerts at local venues such as SOMA, which alerted local independent record label Cargo Music. Hoppus was the only member to sign the contract, as DeLonge was at work at the time and Raynor was still a minor. The Cheshire Cat sessions were to be the last performance with the band for Raynor, whose family had moved to Reno, Nevada. Raynor stayed with his sister for the summer of 1993 in order to rehearse for the recording of their debut album. Raynor moved to Reno following the recording and was briefly replaced by school friend Mike Krull. The band saved money and began flying Raynor out to shows, but eventually Raynor would move back to San Diego to live with Hoppus and his family. His parents allowed him to drop out of full-time school to move back and play with the band, but he would continue to finish his diploma by bringing homework on tour. "I think Mark and his sister Anne and I stayed up watching old TV shows until morning that whole summer," he recalled.

"The summer I lived with Mark and his family was probably the greatest summer of my life so far," said Raynor in 2001. "I left home at 17, came to San Diego, we bought a van, finished our first video… I had all kinds of dreams in my head and they were all coming true."

=== Mainstream success and dismissal from Blink-182 ===
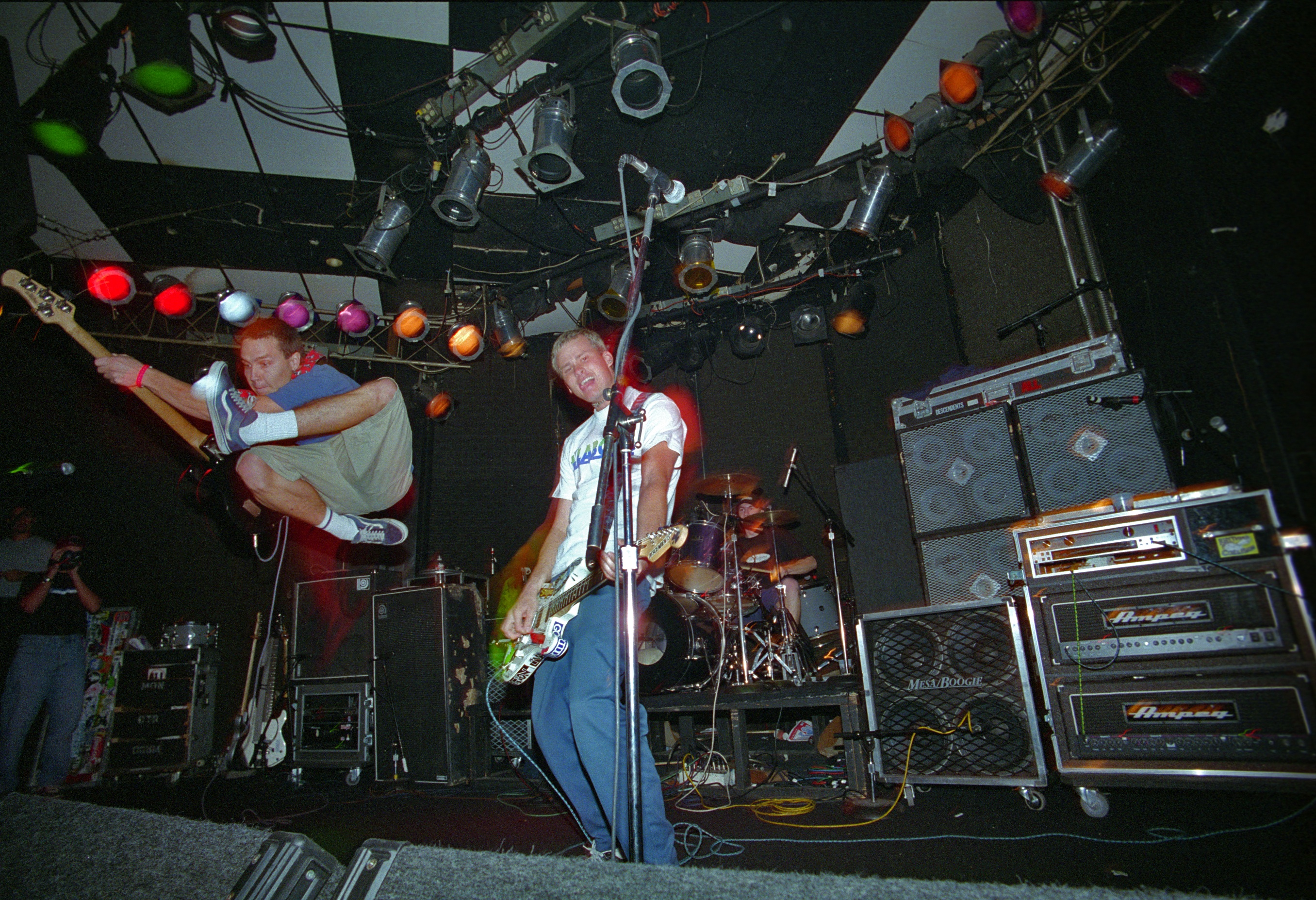
Blink-182 at the Whiskey in 1996

By March 1996, the trio began to accumulate a genuine buzz among major labels, resulting in a bidding war between Interscope, MCA, and Epitaph. MCA's persistence and sincerity won the band over, as well as their promise of complete artistic freedom, but Raynor held a great affinity for Epitaph and began to feel half-invested in the band when they passed over the label. The band began recording their sophomore effort Dude Ranch that winter. The record hit stores the following summer and the band headed out on the Warped Tour, which Raynor described as "one of the most unequivocally positive experiences of my time with the band." When lead single "Dammit" began rotation at Los Angeles-based KROQ, other stations took notice and the single was added to rock radio playlists across the country. Desperate for a break due to extended touring, the overworked band began to argue and tensions formed, centering largely around Raynor.

I always had aspirations for the band that went beyond the independent paradigm. I didn't measure success in terms of oppositional credibility. I loved being on the radio and MTV. We were certified products of pop culture, born and bred in suburbia. I was happy for the band when we got signed.

— Raynor on his relationship with the band

Raynor had planned from the earliest days of the band to one day attend college, as he said in a partially tongue-in-cheek remark in a 1994 interview: "I don't want to be 30 and still in a punk-rock band. That seems kind of scary to me." Shortly after the band released Dude Ranch, Raynor began to think outside of the situation, viewing the major label experience as nothing like he had hoped. He had only been half invested in the band since signing to MCA, as he felt it offered less creative freedom, especially in comparison to Epitaph, which had been pursuing the band and was Raynor's first choice. "I mean, I was intellectually invested, I recognized it as a smart move financially. But it's like that song says, 'I Left My Heart in San Francisco'; I left my heart in the office at Epitaph. After that compromise I found it difficult to make further ones, and I felt like I was asked to make a lot. Eventually, there was not enough of my heart in the band to justify my sticking around. I backed away, I was dead weight."

The tension came to a head in February 1998 as the band embarked on SnoCore, described as "a winter version of the Warped Tour." Sharing the stage with Primus, the band was enjoying more success than ever before, but the drama between the musicians had grown substantially. Relations reached a low point when the band engaged in a fight on a Nebraska date after SnoCore's conclusion. Shortly after the conclusion of SnoCore was a short mini-tour along the western coast, most notably Southern California, the band's favorite place to play. The tour ended with the band headlining a sold-out show at the Palladium in Hollywood, where the band had dreamed of performing for years.

Raynor suffered a "tragic loss" during the West Coast mini-tour and flew home, forcing the band to find a fill-in drummer: Travis Barker of the ska punk support band The Aquabats. Barker learned the drum tracks for the band's set in only 45 minutes prior to his first show. Raynor returned for the band's Hollywood Palladium performance, and the band became increasingly uneasy and arguments grew worse. To offset personal issues, Raynor began to drink heavily and it began to affect the band's performances. Following a largely successful Australian tour in the spring, Hoppus and DeLonge presented an ultimatum: quit drinking or go to an in-patient rehab. Raynor agreed to both and informed the band of his decision after taking the weekend to mull options. According to Raynor, he was fired through a phone call despite his agreement to rehab. Despite this, he felt no malice toward his former bandmates and conceded they were "right" to fire him. The band minimized the impact of the situation in future interviews and remained vague regarding his departure. The band later worked Raynor's departure into a song, "Man Overboard", which makes reference to his alcohol abuse.

According to Hoppus, who wrote about Raynor’s departure in his memoir Fahrenheit-182, Raynor had chosen to quit the band after being given the ultimatum. Hoppus stated, "the relationship with [Raynor] ended on the worst note possible, I feel like there’s a lot unsaid with Scott, and I would love to have that kind of closure at some point in my life. I don’t know when that is and it’s not something that I can force." Hoppus also revealed that Raynor called him a year after he left the band and, "ran through a laundry list of grievances, both real and imagined, cursed me and Tom, called us hypocrites." The phone call was the last time Hoppus spoke to Raynor.

=== Later work ===
Raynor has kept a low profile since exiting Blink-182; he has taken part in few interviews, aside from a 2004 AbsolutePunk piece and portions for Joe Shooman's unauthorized 2010 biography of the band, Blink-182: The Bands, The Breakdown & The Return.

In his immediate years after leaving the group, Raynor kept himself busy with various musical projects, including a band called The Axidentals. Raynor played guitar for the group, which recorded an EP and a full-length that was left unreleased when Vagrant Records showed interest in signing the band. By the time the deal went through, Raynor was having disputes with the group and quit; the band later released their debut album as Death on Wednesday through Vagrant in 2000. Raynor later went on to perform with the group Grimbly from 2000 to 2001, which recorded an extended play at Doubletime Studios. Recorded live over the course of a day, Raynor has described it as dark comedy, "a Black Sabbath, Ramones, and "Weird Al" Yankovic milkshake." Raynor fulfilled a long-held ambition to work with Nirvana producer Jack Endino on an EP recorded with The Spazms in 2004. "The language of the whole record really speaks for me. It's deskilled, nihilistic, and posits, by default not intention, a Franco-feminism", he said.

In the 2000s, he began contributing to a charity called StandUp for Kids, an outreach organization that helped street and homeless youth. He also taught music to teens in trouble with the law under the Street of Dreams program. In 2003, a rumor circulated on the Internet that Raynor had been shot dead; he addressed the hoax via a letter he e-mailed to the sites in question, that instead directed the attention to the StandUp for Kids organization. He continued to play music; in 2017, Raynor joined the Los Angeles post-punk band The Wraith, with whom he released the extended play Shadow Flag. He left the band some time after, but re-joined in 2019. Raynor appears in the music video for the song "Wing of Night", although he didn't take part in the writing process. In January 2020, Raynor left The Wraith again; the band continued with a new drummer.

As of 2023, Raynor had joined the San Diego Police Department and lives in San Diego.

== Discography ==
=== With Blink-182 ===
Albums

- Buddha (1994, Filter Records)
- Cheshire Cat (1995, Cargo/Grilled Cheese)
- Dude Ranch (1997, Cargo/MCA)

EPs

- They Came to Conquer... Uranus (1996, Grilled Cheese)

Singles

- "M+M's" (1995, Cheshire Cat, promo)
- "Wasting Time" (1996, Cheshire Cat)
- "Apple Shampoo" (1997, Dude Ranch)
- "Dammit" (1997, Dude Ranch)
- "I Won't Be Home for Christmas" (1997, Cargo/MCA, promo)
- "Dick Lips" (1998, Dude Ranch)
- "Josie" (1998, Dude Ranch)
