= StandUp for Kids =

US non-profit organization

- Founded: 1990; 36 years ago
- Type: Not-for-profit organisation
- Legal status: 501(c)(3)
- Purpose: Serving unaccompanied homeless and at risk youth up to age 25
- Location: Decatur, Georgia, United States
- Region served: United States
- Services: Youth outreach, housing support, school mentoring, and food access
- National executive director: Kelly Fields
- Volunteers: Hundreds (2024)
- Website: www.standupforkids.org

StandUp for Kids is an American 501(c)(3) not-for-profit organization founded in 1990 headquartered in Decatur, Georgia. Its stated mission is to "End the Cycle of Youth Homelessness". StandUp for Kids is run almost entirely by volunteers and has established multiple outreach programs over the United States. It is dedicated to making a difference to at-risk or homeless kids.

== Mission ==
The stated mission of StandUp for Kids is to "End the Cycle of Youth Homelessness". StandUp for Kids volunteers work directly with the homeless youth population and go on the streets to find, stabilize, and otherwise help homeless and street kids. StandUp for Kids also provides deterrence and resource programs in schools and via the internet.

== Organization ==
StandUp for Kids is run almost entirely by volunteers, who fill a variety of positions including Executive Director, Public Relations Manager, Community Resource Director, Outreach and Apartment Support Directors, and Adult Training Directors. StandUp for Kids is headquartered in Decatur, Georgia, US, and has programs in other large cities, including San Diego, California, Atlanta, Georgia, and Washington, DC.
