= Dick Lips =

Single by Blink-182

from the album Dude Ranch
- Released: February 28, 1998
- Recorded: December 1996–January 1997
- Studio: Big Fish Studios (Encinitas, California)
- Genre: Pop punk; skate punk
- Length: 3:00
- Label: Grilled Cheese
- Songwriters: Mark Hoppus; Tom DeLonge; Scott Raynor
- Producer: Mark Trombino

Blink-182 singles chronology
"Dammit" (1997)	"Dick Lips" (1998)	"Josie" (1998)

"Dick Lips" is a song by American rock band Blink-182, released on February 28, 1998, as the third single from the group's second studio album, Dude Ranch (1997). The song was released by Grilled Cheese, a subsidiary label of Cargo Music. It was the band's final single with Cargo; "Josie" was distributed jointly through MCA before they left the label by the end of the year.

== Background ==
"Dick Lips" was written about an experience in Tom DeLonge's high school years, in which he got kicked out of Poway High School during his junior year (1991) after being caught inebriated at a school basketball game. He then attended Rancho Bernardo High School for the remainder of his high school years. "Being kicked out of school was bad, but it was also the best thing in my life. Because none of us would be here today," DeLonge said in 2001. "Blink-182 is one million percent around today because I got kicked out of school.” The title has no real significance; it was an insult bandied around the Big Fish Studios while recording, that the band wanted to record "for posterity."

The song largely "failed to register" on international charts, in part due to the continued success of lead single "Dammit".

== Composition ==
The song is composed in the key of A major and is set in time signature of common time with a moderately fast tempo of 124 beats per minute. DeLonge's vocal range spans from E_{4} to E_{5}.

== Reception ==
Consequence of Sound, in a 2015 top 10 of the band's best songs, ranked it as number seven, commenting, "Without delving into unnecessary details, the lyrics hint at an abusive household and a prospect of romantic longing that serves no purpose beyond the promise of 'something new.' Blink often suffered from spelling out its themes, but 'Dick Lips' represents one of those rare times they simply let the song speak for itself."

== Format and track listing ==
CD (1998)

1. "Dick Lips" – 2:56
2. "Apple Shampoo" – 2:52
3. "Wrecked Him" – 2:50
4. "Zulu" – 2:07

== Personnel ==
Blink-182

- Tom DeLonge – guitar, lead vocals
- Mark Hoppus – bass, backing vocals
- Scott Raynor – drums

Production

- Mark Trombino – production, recording, mixing
- Brian Gardner – mastering
