= Wasting Time (Blink-182 song) =

Single by Blink-182

from the album Cheshire Cat
- Released: May 20, 1996
- Recorded: 1994
- Studio: Westbeach Recorders, Los Angeles, California
- Length: 2:49
- Label: Cargo Music; Grilled Cheese; Rapido
- Songwriters: Mark Hoppus; Scott Raynor; Tom DeLonge; Jeff Forrest
- Producer: O

Blink-182 singles chronology
"M+M's" (1995)	"Wasting Time" (1996)	"Apple Shampoo" (1997)

"Wasting Time" is a song by American rock band Blink-182, released on May 20, 1996 in Australia, and on June 28, 1996 elsewhere, as the second and final single from the group's debut studio album, Cheshire Cat (1995).

== Background ==
An early version of "Wasting Time" appears on the band’s 1994 split 7-inch with the Iconoclasts, Short Bus.

"Wasting Time" largely centers on an attempt to gain the attention of a girl, to the point of writing a song about her. The line "In my town, you can’t drive naked" was suggested by engineer Jeff Forrest when Hoppus was recording vocals for the track at Doubletime Studios in San Diego. "Jeff never offered any further insight into what may have been the source material for this pro-active free association, and we never asked," remembered drummer Scott Raynor in 2010.

Mike Halloran of XETRA-FM and producer O considered "Wasting Time" to be the band's debut single, but chose "M+M's" instead. "Wasting Time" was released as a single by Cargo/Grilled Cheese in the summer of 1996, and was the final single from Cheshire Cat. It was released as an "Australian Tour EP", and contains early versions of two songs later re-recorded for the band's major label debut, Dude Ranch: "Lemmings" and "Enthused".

== Reception ==
MTV News journalist James Montgomery wrote that "I grew up a Blink fan [...] I used to blare "Wasting Time" in my 1988 Caprice Classic and put it on a mixtape for my high school girlfriend."

== Format and track listing ==
CD (1996)
No.	Title	Length
1.	"Wasting Time"	2:46
2.	"Wrecked Him"	2:56
3.	"Lemmings" (re-recorded for Dude Ranch)	2:50
4.	"Enthused" (re-recorded for Dude Ranch)	2:43

== Personnel ==
- Scott Raynor – drums
- Tom DeLonge – guitars, vocals
- Mark Hoppus – bass, vocals

== Chart positions ==
Chart (1996)	Peak position
Australia (ARIA)	90
