= Apple Shampoo =

Single by Blink-182

from the album Dude Ranch
- Released: April 14, 1997
- Recorded: December 1996–January 1997
- Studio: Big Fish Studios (Encinitas, California)
- Length: 2:52
- Label: Cargo Music; Grilled Cheese; Rapido
- Songwriters: Mark Hoppus; Tom DeLonge; Scott Raynor
- Producer: Mark Trombino

Blink-182 singles chronology
"Wasting Time" (1996)	"Apple Shampoo" (1997)	"Dammit" (1997)

"Apple Shampoo" is a song by American rock band Blink-182, released on April 14, 1997, in Australia as the first single from the group's second studio album, Dude Ranch (1997). The song was released as a single in Australia only, through an exclusive license with Mushroom Records imprint label Rapido.

== Background ==
The song, which regards a failing relationship, was inspired by the end of Mark Hoppus' relationship with Elyse Rogers of the ska punk band Dance Hall Crashers, with whom Blink toured in 1996. The song's title came from Rogers' favorite type of shampoo. Hoppus said, "[Rogers] always smelt like apple shampoo and that's why I named it 'Apple Shampoo' [be]cause it's about her. It would've been really bad form to name the song 'Elyse from Dance Hall Crashers'."

Hoppus later described "Apple Shampoo" as one of the most personal songs he had written, explaining that writing about real experiences helped listeners relate to the band's music. In a 1998 interview, he called it "the most honest song on the record", adding that it had taken him a long time to write and remained the composition with "the most impact" for him personally, despite having since moved on from the relationship that inspired it.

== Composition ==
The song is composed in the key of C major and is set in time signature of common time with a fast tempo of 216 beats per minute. Hoppus's vocal range spans from G_{4} to A_{5}.

== Release ==
"Apple Shampoo" was released as an Australia-exclusive single through Rapido, the ska/punk imprint of Festival Mushroom Records. Rapido had previously served as blink-182's Australian distributor, issuing several country-exclusive releases, including "Wasting Time", and remained involved following the band's signing to MCA Records under a provision in the group's recording contract. The single was released to coincide with blink-182's Australian dates on the 1997 Warped Tour. Australia was one of the first international markets where the band developed a substantial following, and the single reached number 90 on the Australian Singles Chart in April 1997.

"Apple Shampoo" has been covered by artists including indie singer-songwriter Colleen Green and the emo band Retirement Party.

== Reception ==
Joel McKinney of the Journal and Courier considered "Apple Shampoo" one of Dude Ranch's strongest songs, praising its dynamic arrangement. He highlighted its "distant, plucking bass", "high-pitched vocals", and abrupt shift from fast-paced verses into a slower guitar passage before returning to a rapid-fire conclusion.

== Format and track listing ==
All songs written by Blink-182, except "Good Times" (D. Grusin, A. Bergman/D.Bergman)

CD (1997)

1. "Apple Shampoo" – 2:54
2. "Voyeur" – 2:46
3. "Good Times" – 1:04

== Personnel ==
Blink-182

- Mark Hoppus – bass, lead vocals
- Tom DeLonge – guitar, backing vocals
- Scott Raynor – drums

Production

- Mark Trombino – production, recording, mixing
- Brian Gardner – mastering

== Chart positions ==
=== Weekly charts ===
Chart (1997)	Peak position
Australia (ARIA)	90
