= Dude Ranch (album) =

1997 studio album by Blink-182

Studio album by Blink-182
- Released: June 17, 1997
- Recorded: December 1996 – January 1997
- Studios: Big Fish, Encinitas, California
- Genres: Skate punk; melodic hardcore; pop-punk; punk rock
- Length: 44:54
- Labels: Cargo; MCA
- Producer: Mark Trombino

Blink-182 chronology
| Cheshire Cat (1995) | Dude Ranch (1997) | Enema of the State (1999) |

Singles from Dude Ranch
- 1. "Apple Shampoo" Released: April 14, 1997; 2. "Dammit" Released: September 23, 1997; 3. "Dick Lips" Released: February 28, 1998; 4. "Josie" Released: November 17, 1998

Dude Ranch is the second studio album by the American rock band Blink-182, released on June 17, 1997. The trio formed in 1992 amid the San Diego skate-punk circuit, and built a growing grassroots following through heavy touring. The growing commercial appeal of punk rock brought the band to the attention of major labels, and the resulting arrangement saw Dude Ranch issued on indie Cargo Music with MCA Records handling distribution. It is the band's final album recorded with all three original members, as drummer Scott Raynor was dismissed from the band in 1998.

Dude Ranch expands the band's fast-paced punk framework with tighter arrangements and melodic harmonies. The band picked producer Mark Trombino based on his work in the emerging emo scene. Written largely on the road, the material mixes the group’s familiar oddball humor with themes related to maturity, relationships, and time. Trombino pushed the band toward tighter, more disciplined performances amid an otherwise playful atmosphere, even as all three members faced personal challenges. The album's visual identity leans into deliberately absurd cowboy imagery.

Upon release, Dude Ranch received generally positive reviews. It steadily expanded Blink-182's reach via touring and radio play, propelled in part by the modern rock breakthrough of "Dammit". The band supported the album on a series of international tours, including a four-month stint on the Warped Tour. Dude Ranch later achieved platinum certification in the United States. Its lasting appeal within punk circles is underscored by the existence of several complete cover versions of the album.

== Background ==
Blink-182 emerged from the early 1990s San Diego skate-punk scene, formed when Mark Hoppus, Tom DeLonge, and Scott Raynor—musicians bonded by a shared love of fast West Coast punk and irreverent humor—began writing songs together in 1992. They first built a loyal local following through homemade demos and small venues like SOMA, releasing their 1995 debut Cheshire Cat on independent label Cargo Music. With a relentless focus on touring, including a breakout presence on the 1996 Vans Warped Tour, the trio connected with audiences far beyond Southern California, especially skateboard- and surf-culture teens. Cheshire Cat sold well for an indie release; it had moved over 70,000 units by late 1996. But the band grew dissatisfied when fans reported being unable to purchase the album at retailers, leading them to explore labels with stronger distribution networks. Relations with Cargo had also begun to deteriorate, as several employees viewed the group as not to be taken seriously.

By the mid-1990s, punk rock was breaking through on a national scale, aided by high-profile releases by bands like Rancid and Green Day. As this interest in commercial punk expanded, A&R departments from numerous major labels began courting the band, including Atlantic, Epic, and Interscope. In March 1996, these attempts culminated in a bidding war, with reps offering industry perks and making aggressive pitches that included high-end dinners and parties. Although fans in the scene criticized moving to major labels as contrary to punk ideals, the band saw practical advantages in broader distribution, increased promotional capability, and the opportunity to reach larger audiences. "The Clash, Sex Pistols and the Ramones did it, so how come we can't?" DeLonge reasoned, reflecting their honest ambitions. Despite this influx of attention, the band initially leaned toward remaining independent. They entered advanced discussions with Epitaph Records, the influential Hollywood punk label home to many of their peers. They viewed the label as capable of mainstream reach without compromising creative freedom. Despite support from artists within that community, the group hesitated over the comparatively small financial advance and the prospect of being overshadowed by Epitaph's flagship acts. Negotiations were complicated by Blink-182’s existing multi-album contract with their Cargo, which required a substantial buyout for any transfer.

Altogether, MCA Records emerged as the band's most viable option, particularly after entering into an upstream distribution partnership with Cargo Music. The arrangement first placed Blink-182 on MCA's radar at a time when major labels increasingly relied on independent imprints as incubators for emerging artists before bringing successful acts into the mainstream.. Eventually, the band's original contract became the property of MCA as part of a corporate acquisition, putting the buyout cost beyond Epitaph's budget and effectively shifting the band onto a major label. The trio were also drawn to the prospect of being one of the label's few punk-leaning acts, which provided a clearer identity within its roster. "Anyone that was in a punk rock band all went to Epitaph or Fat," the band's manager, Rick DeVoe, said later. "But Green Day stood alone on Warner, so we wanted to do the same." Though MCA was struggling through a quiet period, earning the derisive industry nickname 'Musicians' Cemetery of America,'" it offered them assurances of full creative autonomy. DeVoe was encouraged by MCA president Jay Boberg, a veteran A&R executive whose résumé included signing artists such as R.E.M. and The Go-Go's. DeVoe was particularly impressed by Boberg's role in breaking The Police, believing the executive could similarly elevate Blink-182 from a successful three-piece into a mainstream act. From the label's viewpoint, the band had already built a self-sufficient operation with touring, merchandising, and grassroots support; the label’s role was simply to expand what the band had already created. Their jump to a major label didn’t curb their juvenile streak; they once used an MCA representative’s computer to circulate a company-wide email claiming he was homosexual.

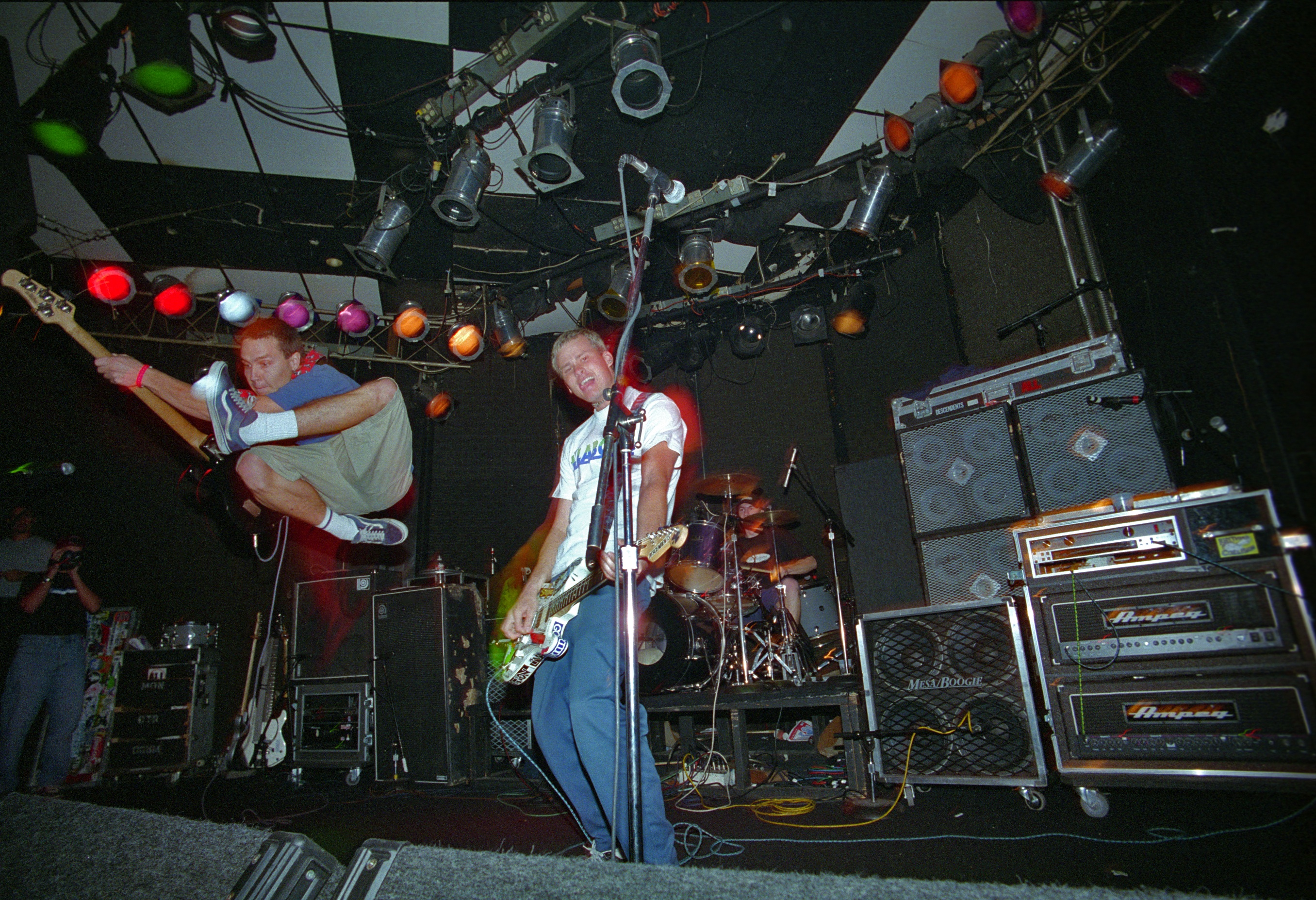
Blink-182 performing in Los Angeles in October 1996

The band’s decision to sign with a major label marked the first real strain in their relationship with drummer Scott Raynor. Though he had no objection to a major—later saying he “didn’t measure success in terms of oppositional credibility” and that he "loved being on the radio and MTV" as "certified products of pop culture"—he was deeply attached to Epitaph and disappointed the band had passed on the label. "Looking back, I marked the decision to go to a major over Epitaph as the point where I was only half-invested in Blink," he told author Joe Shooman. Raynor was also struggling with long stretches on the road. At a signing celebration at the Hotel del Coronado, tensions with a girlfriend boiled over, and the inebriated drummer jumped from a second-story balcony, breaking both heels. This injury forced him to record the resulting album in a wheelchair. Altogether, between the label compromise and the physical and emotional toll of touring, Raynor later admitted, "Eventually, there was not much of my heart in the band to justify my sticking around. I backed away. I was dead weight."

== Recording and production ==
=== Pre-production ===
We write simple songs. In fact, the best songs are the ones that happen immediately and spontaneously. If you work on a song for weeks and weeks, you're forcing it...Every song has its own creation story. Sometimes someone comes to practice with a complete song. Other times we only have a riff, and we hammer out the right words. Mostly, we just screw around until inspiration hits.

— Hoppus on the band's songwriting techniques.

To develop the album, the band booked time at DML Studios in Escondido, California, where they worked out arrangements for new songs. Most of the lyrics for the album had been written over 1995 and 1996, while touring. "I remember writing most of those songs in my living room, sitting on a curb, whatever," recalled DeLonge in 2001. "Back then, each song was pretty much written with a specific girl or event in mind." Demos for the album were recorded with Warren Fitzgerald of the Vandals; early versions of "Enthused" and "Lemmings" were released on the "Wasting Time" single and the Lemmings / Going Nowhere split EP, respectively.

The album's creative direction was shaped by both the band’s peers and the growing punk and emo scenes. While preparing Dude Ranch, Blink-182 drew inspiration from groups such as Jawbreaker, Bad Religion, and Lagwagon. A pivotal moment came during a tour stop at Denver's Mercury Café, where they shared a bill with Arizona rockers Jimmy Eat World. Impressed by their set, the members of Blink-182 became enthusiastic fans of the group’s then-unreleased major-label debut Static Prevails. "It just blew my mind," Hoppus recalled. "The guitars sounded insane. Everything just sounded so good. We listened to that cassette over and over and over in our tour van." The album's dynamic, polished sound prompted them to seek out its producer: Mark Trombino, a fellow San Diego musician and former drummer of Drive Like Jehu. They first connected with Trombino through their friendship with local punk band Fluf. While initially slated to record with another producer, the three picked Trombino because of his familiarity with the studio itself and his major-label know-how.

=== Recording ===
Blink-182 entered the studio in December 1996 to record Dude Ranch, at Big Fish Studios in Rancho Santa Fe, California, a rural facility in San Diego's North County. The studio, a converted guesthouse on a large property, sat between horse farms and wooded areas. The community had been recently devastated by wildfires, which the band sometimes used as the backdrop for their impromptu videos and antics. The band were afforded more time to record than previous endeavors, and now had the time and resources to fully realize their vision. During breaks, the trio entertained themselves with computer mah-jongg, Crash Bandicoot, and "reading the articles from the shelves and shelves of Playboys that the studio had thoughtfully provided." The group ate lunch nearly each day at Sombrero, a local Mexican restaurant namedropped in "Josie", and Chinese for dinner from Encinitas' Pick Up Stix.

Mark Trombino oversaw the sessions, and also contributed piano and keyboards. Trombino emphasized precision and pushed the band toward tighter performances, frequently requiring multiple takes to achieve the desired sound. Hoppus likened him to a "musical accountant." This disciplined approach contrasted with the band’s playful energy, often prompting pranks and attempts to break his composure. Though the band often saw him as quiet and reserved, he was simply navigating the unusual dynamic of producing a group that had already achieved far greater commercial success than he had. In his own words, he felt "excited, but also nervous and intimidated... these guys had sold way more records than I had ever sold and I’m sitting in the producer’s chair telling them what to do." Despite that unease, Trombino was struck by their unusual combination of humor and ambition, noting that they were “the most business-centric band I’d ever seen at that point. They had their shit together." In addition to the record, Trombino produced "I Won't Be Home for Christmas", a Christmas song recorded during the Dude Ranch sessions.

Despite the creative boom while writing lyrics for the album, all three members of Blink-182 faced setbacks while recording Dude Ranch. DeLonge was having vocal problems and spent much time recording and re-recording vocal tracks, and Hoppus realized he too was having difficulty singing after losing his voice during a one-off Christmas concert. Hoppus realized the magnitude of the situation and cancelled the final week of recording in December 1996. He quit smoking in order to take care of his voice, which was stressed due to lack of vocal warm-ups, full days of vocal tracks, and the strain of singing for "Dammit", which was accidentally written just outside his vocal range. Meanwhile, Raynor had to record his drum tracks while still in his wheelchair, the result of injuries sustained at the signing party. He would wheelchair up to the drum set and scoot onto the drum throne and play," remembered Trombino in a later interview. "I got the sense that [the band] were bummed."

=== Post-production ===
It would be January 1997 by the time the band was able to wrap up sessions for Dude Ranch, eventually amounting to five weeks of recording. For the final touches, Unwritten Law frontman Scott Russo donated a few vocal tracks to "Josie", and Trombino let Blink-182 record a couple of jokes between songs using a sound-effects machine he owned. The group contacted Fletcher Dragge of Pennywise to find someone to remix a few tracks from the album, and he suggested Donnell Cameron of Track Recording Studios. The band went in to Track and re-recorded Raynor's drum tracks for several songs. After production completed, the album was mastered by Brian Gardner at Bernie Grundman Mastering in Hollywood. Both DeLonge and Hoppus later reflected on the sessions with pride, noting that Dude Ranch represented the first time the band could fully focus on producing a professional-quality album.

Despite concerns that a major label might sanitize the band, Blink-182 made the album exactly as they hoped, aside from management persuading them to drop a parody of "Macarena" called "Hey Wipe Your Anus"—not due to its stupidity, but legal clearance. Label representatives only dropped by on occasion and seemed excited by the material they heard. "When we were in there mixing, the A&R person would come by," remembered Cameron. "I don't think the band really knew what they had but certainly the label knew they had so many good songs on the record." DeLonge remembered it differently: "[Label executives] fucking hated pop-punk. They wanted nothing to do with it. They were into Pavement or whatever."

According to Hoppus, the internal playback session at MCA’s Los Angeles headquarters drew little employee attention:

We drove up from San Diego to Los Angeles to present the album to MCA. We brought the DAT there and we sat down in this lounge area at the label. Somebody walked around and said, ‘Hey, Blink is here to present their new record!' Out of the entire office, five or six people came to listen. We played the first song, then the second song, then by the third song people started checking their BlackBerrys, saying, ‘Uh, I have to go make a phone call.’ By the fifth song, it was one person, who was on their [phone] the whole time. By song six or seven, it was just me, Scott, and Tom sitting there by ourselves. That was our reception from MCA when we presented our first major-label record, recorded in a real studio, with a real producer. We couldn’t even get the people at the label to listen to the whole album.

== Music ==
"Emo"
Emo as a genre is characterized by expressive, confessional lyrics, and the trio named this song after DeLonge's favorite band at the time, Jimmy Eat World. "And while later pop-punk bands such as the Promise Ring will implausibly deny their emo tendencies, the scrupulously unpretentious Blink actually name one of their bitter anthems after the frequently derided genre," wrote Rolling Stone.

Musically, Dude Ranch continues Blink-182's high-energy punk style, and subtly expands it with more complex vocal harmonies, and keyboard accompaniment, such as the Hammond organ. According to music critic Stephen Thomas Erlewine, Dude Ranch is an album of "juvenile, adrenaline-fueled punk-pop." Billboard magazine's Doug Reece described it as "a collection of machine-gun-quick, energetic punk songs—sometimes with a puerile slant—about such topics as girlfriends, broken hearts, and fights with one's parents." At Alternative Press, it was characterized as a "killer skate-punk record". Greg Simpsons at Punknews.org too labeled it skate punk, stating that the album "set [the] blueprint for their style of poppy, goofy skate punk that they would later bring to the masses." DeLonge considered the album a step up in terms of songwriting, with "Dammit" proving the breakthrough to him. The album's guitar tone has been interpreted as scratchy and displaying a "blown-out quality that's in constant combat with the vastly more refined vocal hooks." DeLonge at the time was playing a "sticker-heavy" Stratocaster with a Seymour Duncan Invader pickup. The album's production, while an improvement on its predecessor, is still more gritty than albums the band made later.

"Pathetic" has been considered a tale of "abject self-pity in the face of collapsed relationship." "Pathetic" is also reportedly about DeLonge's mother being disappointed about how DeLonge was doing in high school and college. "Voyeur" explores the life of a peeping Tom. The distinctive riff of "Dammit" was created when Hoppus was forced to skip over the missing two strings on an acoustic guitar. The song's theme is maturity, exemplified by the refrain, "Well, I guess this is growing up." "Dick Lips" was named after an insult the trio bandied around at Big Fish during recording. It was written about DeLonge's experience when he was kicked out of Poway High School for showing up to a basketball game while intoxicated. "Waggy" was a word Hoppus created while belching, prompting him to name the song with it. "Untitled" has been considered a tribute to the emerging ska punk scene, and "Emo" by its namesake, which is partly a tribute to DeLonge's favorite band at that time, Jimmy Eat World.

"Apple Shampoo" was inspired by Elyse Rogers of Dance Hall Crashers, whom Hoppus dated; the title is culled from a particular brand of shampoo she often used. "Josie" makes further reference to Dance Hall Crashers and the band Unwritten Law ("My girlfriend likes UL and DHC"). "A New Hope" takes the standard rock subject matter of a hopeless crush and rewrites it with details of the Star Wars series. The original Star Wars trilogy were popular during Hoppus' childhood into the late 1970s and early 1980s, and a theatrical re-release in the late 1990s reinvigorated interest in the series. "Degenerate" is a re-recording of a track that first appeared on the band's demo cassette Demo No.2. "Lemmings" is another re-recorded track, which had previously only been available on a 7-inch. The band felt the song was strong enough that it should not be limited to those owning record players.

== Artwork and packaging ==
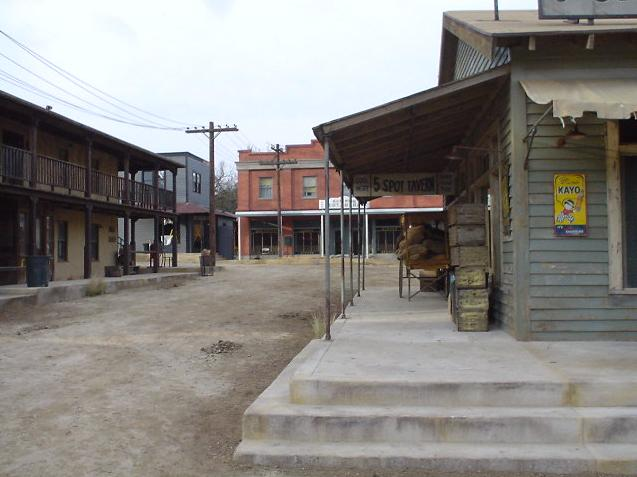
The album artwork is themed after cowboy kitsch and was photographed on a Hollywood backlot.

The band titled the album Dude Ranch after the band's term for parties attended exclusively by men, joking that "there are no girls" at a "dude ranch." The band joked that the album was originally titled Attack of the Epileptic Proctologist. Some listeners, noting the record's raunchy humor and sexual themes, interpreted the title as a crude double entendre referring to semen—a reading Hoppus says was entirely accidental. "We never meant it that way," Hoppus later explained. "In the context of Blink-182 album titles, it makes sense as a pun, but that wasn’t the intention. I just liked the way the words sounded together."

The album cover depicts a bull on a farm branded with the logo for the band, with its prominent testicles swinging below. The accompanying packaging is themed around cowboy and Western ephemera. For the accompanying photography, the band staged a shoot on the Old Mexico backlot at Universal Studios Hollywood, shot by Steven Shea. Writing in The Sydney Morning Herald, Vanessa McQuarrie likened the album's cover artwork—which depicts the band dressed as cowboys—to the characters from The Three Amigos. The resulting images feature unconventional and intentionally absurd poses. "Trams full of tourists passed by, hoping to catch a glimpse of a movie being filmed, but were instead subjected to me in a steel bathtub, fully nude save for soapsuds covering my shame, while Tom scrubbed me down with a mop," Hoppus remembered.

The cover design, a collage by artist Lou Beach, features a bull with the band's name branded on its rear end. The gatefold packaging features a painting stating "Greetings from the Blink-182 Dude Ranch," which was intended to be a pastiche of both "cheesy postcards" and a parody of Bruce Springsteen's Greetings from Asbury Park, N.J.. Art direction for the album was headed by MCA in-house graphic artist Tim Stedman, with Stedman and designer Ashley Pigford crafting the visual package. The CD art, a revolver chamber, was designed by artist Victor Gastelum. DeLonge recalled in 2012 that the only "bad" aspect of Dude Ranch in retrospect were the jokes found within the inside artwork: "I remember sitting at the Sombrero taco shop going, 'Fuck, we’ve got to finish off our album cover, let's just write some jokes to these cowboy pictures.' Why did we do that? We should have had better jokes for those pictures."

== Release ==
I remember right before Christmas [1997], we sold 40,000 copies in one week. That's when I went, 'Oh my God, this is heavy.' That and when I had a gold record and gave it to my dad. My dad was all about business and getting a career, go to school and everything, and he was not always as supportive about the band, never understood. Then when I gave him a gold record, he was kind of, like, emotional. He was all proud of me.

— Tom DeLonge

Dude Ranch was released on June 17, 1997, jointly through Cargo Music and MCA Records. Dude Ranch was originally set as a joint release between Cargo Records, and MCA subsidiary Way Cool Music, a Sunset Beach-based label run by Mike Jacobs. A year after the album's release, MCA bought out the remaining two years of Way Cool's joint-venture agreement, dissolving the label. MCA gained the rights to the bands on the label, including Blink-182. In Australia, Dude Ranch was released jointly with Rapido, a ska/punk sub-label of what was then Festival Mushroom Records. The band had previously issued Oz-only singles ("Wasting Time") through the label, and arranged a stipulation in their contract with MCA that the label remain involved.

The record, at first, largely passed without notice from audiences outside their established fan base. The band sold copies of the album out of the trunk of their tour van. With fan support and the trio touring nonstop, the album's sales began to improve. The momentum from touring helped Dude Ranch sell 3,000–4,000 units a week, and the record sold 40,000 copies by August 1997. Dude Ranch was promoted by the label through board-sport magazines and tie-ins between surf shops and record stores. At retail, MCA and Cargo organized midnight sales promotions on the West Coast. The popularity of the trio in Australia has been cited as the sign that alerted major record companies of Dude Ranch's commercial potential; at the time, the album had spent five months on the charts and the band became famous for their stage show while on the 1997 Warped Tour. Thanks to increased recognition, the band dropped Cargo and fully signed with MCA in 1998 to handle increased distribution. Punk rock purists asserted the band were betraying their indie roots by even considering major label proposals and began to address the band as "sell-outs".

Sales improved dramatically when the record's lead single, "Dammit", began making rounds at rock radio. MCA's marketing strategy involved waiting until after the band's Warped Tour performances wrapped in order to have a retail story to back up radio promotion efforts. The label first serviced "Dammit" in August 1997 and several SoCal stations were quick to pick up the single, finding it to be a good match alongside Green Day and The Offspring radio hits. The song was released in September, and was added to the playlist of Los Angeles–based radio station KROQ, after which the song began to be played across the country. Mainstream rock received "Dammit" in November, and MTV picked up the "Dammit" video, bumping it into "stress rotation" in December. This led to feature stories in magazines such as Billboard and Rolling Stone. Radio-wise, "Dammit" achieved great commercial success, peaking at number 11 on the US rock charts in 1998. The year-end Billboard Airplay Monitor Report (BDS) stats indicated that "Dammit" earned top spins at many key radio stations. In addition, its success knocked Dude Ranch onto the all-genre Billboard 200 album chart for the first time, where it peaked at number 67 in February 1998. On January 24, 1998, Billboard reported that Dude Ranch sold more than 268,000 copies, according to Nielsen SoundScan. Dude Ranch spent a total of 48 weeks in the top 200 in the United States.

Dude Ranch, which was certified gold by the Recording Industry Association of America (RIAA) on February 9, 1998, yielded three more singles, which did not attract the same commercial success as "Dammit". "Apple Shampoo" was the second single release from Dude Ranch, released in October 1997. "Although it didn't have the impact of "Dammit", it hardly mattered as the former was still receiving heavy play on radio and TV stations across the nation", wrote journalist Joe Shooman. "Dick Lips" was released in February 1998 but failed to register on charts. "Josie" became the record's fourth and final single in November 1998. Its music video also received MTV airplay and the single charted at number 31 in Australia. For the single release of both "Dammit" and "Josie", the songs were remixed and remastered by Tom Lord-Alge. The unreleased Dude Ranch cut "I Won't Be Home for Christmas" was released as an international single in 2001, only successful in Canada, but charting for six non-consecutive weeks at number one. Dude Ranch was certified platinum by the RIAA on November 8, 1999. As of June 30, 2001, Dude Ranch sold 1,100,000 copies, according to Nielsen SoundScan.

== Critical reception ==
Professional ratings
Review scores
| Source | Rating |
|---|---|
| Allmusic | 4.5/5 stars |
| IGN | 7/10 stars |
| Sputnikmusic | 4/5 stars |
| Rolling Stone | 3/5 stars |

Initial reviews of Dude Ranch were generally positive, with critics praising its infectious melodies, memorable hooks, and blend of melodic pop songwriting with fast-paced punk, though some dismissed it as lightweight or lacking emotional depth. A CMJ write-up commented, "Dude Ranch has the hooks and sonic wallop to rocket Blink-182 into stadiums throughout the nation. British rock magazine Kerrang! published a negative early review: the reviewer laments the disc's "little depth, passion, soul and even vaguely memorable hooks." In an early editorial review from Amazon.com, journalist Mark Woodlief called it "another infectious collection of snotty vocals, punchy rhythms, vivid lyrics, and aggressive chords." He further wrote that Trombino "shines some of the scuffed edges, but this is still good ol' Blink at its sunny, effervescent best," also complimenting the trio's "odd knack for crafting basslines that recall—seriously!—New Order, and vocal harmonies that owe debts to the Beach Boys." Ed Condran at the Asbury Park Press called it "a bunch of infectious tracks. Such tunes as 'Waggy', 'Pathetic' and 'Josie' are speedy pop gems." Michael Mihelich of The Windsor Star described Dude Ranch as "punk with a pop edge," praising its blend of melodic hooks and fast-paced punk energy.

Later reviews were subsequently more positive. Rolling Stone regarded Dude Ranch as the moment "the trio focused and refined their pop-punk sound," summarizing the record's themes: "bassist Mark Hoppus plays the straight man, singing sturdily and deadpan, while the squeakier-voiced guitarist Tom DeLonge bleats urgently about romance gone wrong." The website AbsolutePunk placed the album on their "Absolute Classics" list in February 2009, calling it a "classic mix" that was successful due to timing. In 2011, a writer for Total Guitar referred to the record as "a genuine modern punk classic," while Scott Heisel of Alternative Press called it a "quantum leap in sonic quality and songwriting." Guitar.com writer Huw Baines writes that the band on Dude Ranch "[settle] into a songwriting mode that was more focused, lean and representative of what they were trying to achieve." In 2000, Gavin Edwards at Rolling Stone called the record a "vast improvement" on its predecessor; in 2017, Maria Sherman for the same magazine praised "the album's disarming combo of humor and raw pop smarts" and opined that "the record's juvenile overtones often conceal real poignancy."

=== Accolades ===
Dude Ranch was awarded Best Punk Album at the 1998 California Music Awards.

| Publication | Country | Accolade | Year | Rank |
|---|---|---|---|---|
| Alternative Press | United States | Class of 1997: 10 Albums That Shaped the Punk of Today | 2007 | * |
| Kerrang! | United Kingdom | 51 Greatest Pop Punk Albums Ever | 2015 | 15 |
| Rolling Stone | United States | Readers' Poll: The 10 Best Pop-Punk Albums of All Time | 2016 | * |
| Rolling Stone | United States | The 50 Greatest Pop-Punk Albums | 2017 | 8 |
| Rolling Stone | United States | The 100 Greatest Punk Albums of All Time | 2026 | 83 |

* denotes an unordered list

== Touring ==
By the release of Dude Ranch in mid-1997, Blink-182 had already developed a reputation as a relentless touring band, having completed two U.S. circuits as well as early trips to Alaska and Australia. Their touring schedule intensified significantly in 1997 when they joined the Warped Tour for its entire global run, after having played only a handful of dates on the festival the previous summer. The band spent four months with the festival, including overseas legs in Europe, Japan, and Australia, while also filling the gaps between Warped dates with their own headlining shows. The tour proved an ideal match: the communal, "punk-rock summer camp" atmosphere helped them forge friendships with peers while exposing them daily to thousands of new fans. Despite the camaraderie, the conditions were often grueling—outdoor summer shows in extreme heat, long overnight drives, and minimal access to showers or rest. The band, still initially traveling by van, endured weeks of sleepless nights and logistical strain, compounded when their tour earnings were stolen mid-route, leaving them temporarily without funds.

The visibility, however, significantly expanded the band's audience, allowing them to upgrade to a bus for travel. Between late 1997 and early 1998, Blink-182 was on the road for roughly nine consecutive months, returning home only briefly between runs. These headlining dates included the domestic Race Around Uranus tour with Less Than Jake, a European tour, and a string of radio station Christmas festivals intended to push "Dammit" onto airwaves. The schedule began to wear on them. "When we did our longest tour stretch, it was right when I started dating my fiancée," recalled DeLonge. "We were all new and in love, and I had to leave. It was just, 'Hey, I'll see you in nine months.' It was really hard." Although live performance itself remained a sustaining force—shows routinely grew in size and reception—the fatigue and lack of stability began impacting the members' daily lives. By early 1998, prolonged stress had deepened existing frictions, particularly with drummer Scott Raynor, whose heavy drinking, personal stress, and unpredictability on the road increasingly strained the group.

During the SnoCore Tour, a winter counterpart to Warped that paired Blink-182 with Primus and the Aquabats, the band’s morale reached a low point amid poor conditions, mismatched audiences, and mounting disagreements. Raynor became increasingly withdrawn, often isolating himself from the group outside of performances. After SnoCore, a brief but successful West Coast run followed, culminating in the band’s first headlining appearance at the Hollywood Palladium—a milestone they had long aspired to. Yet even this achievement was disrupted when Raynor temporarily left the tour, prompting the Aquabats' drummer Travis Barker to step in with only minutes of preparation. Both Hoppus and DeLonge immediately recognized he was a natural fit for the band, and Barker finished the remainder of the tour playing double duty for both bands. When Hoppus and DeLonge first floated the idea of him joining full-time, Barker held back out of respect for Raynor's position, but indicated interest. Behind the scenes, Hoppus began calling him weekly, hinting that a lineup shift was likely.

Tensions with Raynor persisted during a subsequent Australian tour, and attempts to resolve the internal conflicts after returning home proved unsuccessful. Hoppus and DeLonge presented an ultimatum over a phone call: quit drinking or go to an in-patient rehab. Raynor reportedly quit on the spot initially, but later asked the band to mull his options over a weekend. His initial response cemented his exit for Hoppus and DeLonge, and though he ultimately agreed to rehab, Raynor was dismissed from the band in June 1998. Raynor later conceded they were "right" to fire him at the time, and held no malice toward his former bandmates. The band would minimize the impact of the situation in future interviews and remained vague regarding his departure. The "Josie" CD single, released in the US in November 1998, was the first Blink-182 release to feature Barker in any capacity (he is pictured on the back cover alongside Hoppus and DeLonge). Barker would join Blink-182 full-time in mid-1998 and toured with the band for the remainder of the year, playing sold-out shows across America on the sophomoric PooPoo PeePee Tour.

== Legacy ==
Dude Ranch was the band's first step into the mainstream and proved to be a pivotal moment for the trio. While subsequent albums sold more copies, Dude Ranch has proved influential in other ways. Lindsay Zoladz provides context for its place in the band's canon in a 2019 piece for The Ringer: "For a lot of pop-punk fans who felt the whiplash of Blink's sudden late-'90s transformation from Warped Tour upstarts to genuine TRL heartthrobs, Dude Ranch came to develop a mythic, almost Edenic glow. It was their final punk record, the one they made before they went pop." Indeed, it was ranked among the top punk albums of all-time by Rolling Stone in 2026. Senior writer Jon Blistein similarly wrote: "Dude Ranch is the masterpiece Blink-182 made right before they fully put the pop in pop punk."

In an anniversary piece celebrating the album, Maria Sherman, writing for MTV News, commented that on Dude Ranch the trio "found a subversive way to embrace lameness as something to be commended—a language all outsiders could understand." Vice columnist Emma Garland writes: "Dude Ranch remains a formative and timeless classic [...] the perfect segue from [Cheshire Cat to their 1999 effort Enema of the State], capturing Blink-182 right on the precipice of self-discovery." Trevor Kelley from Alternative Press credited it with "reigniting" the pop punk movement while calling it a "huge source of inspiration for a new generation of bands," such as Midtown and New Found Glory. The members of FIDLAR credited the album's impact, while original Panic! at the Disco guitarist Ryan Ross has cited the album as his first influence: "I wanted to learn how to play like Tom DeLonge [on Dude Ranch]." The musician Day Wave has said the album made the band his grade-school heroes; likewise, the Wonder Years frontman Dan Campbell wore out his copy of the album: "I played Dude Ranch to death," he laughed in a 2022 interview. Some writers, like Chris Payne at Billboard, have suggested hints of the album's impact in groups like Cloud Nothings.

At least three full-length album covers of Dude Ranch have been released. In 2019, American musician Colleen Green issued a cassette-only cover of Dude Ranch in her signature lo-fi style. Green's cover was widely celebrated: "There's a sepia quality to Green's covers, as if they've been filtered through translucent gobs of memory," wrote Randall Colburn for The A.V. Club. It's Never Over Til It's Done, a charity album supporting Black transgender communities, was released in 2020 and contained covers by bands like Joyce Manor, Adult Mom, and Rozwell Kid. Another "concept cover album" by American musician Cameron Hurley (under the name new.wav) saw release in 2023, this time in the high-energy and sonic style of the band's later work with Barker and producer Jerry Finn. The album's title is also the namesake for one Blink-182 cover band.

== Track listing ==
All tracks are written by Mark Hoppus, Tom DeLonge, and Scott Raynor.

| No. | Title | Lead vocals | Length |
|---|---|---|---|
| 1. | "Pathetic" | Hoppus; DeLonge | 2:27 |
| 2. | "Voyeur" | DeLonge | 2:43 |
| 3. | "Dammit" | Hoppus | 2:45 |
| 4. | "Boring" | DeLonge | 1:41 |
| 5. | "Dick Lips" | DeLonge | 2:57 |
| 6. | "Waggy" | Hoppus | 3:16 |
| 7. | "Enthused" | DeLonge | 2:48 |
| 8. | Untitled | DeLonge | 2:46 |
| 9. | "Apple Shampoo" | Hoppus | 2:52 |
| 10. | "Emo" | Hoppus | 2:50 |
| 11. | "Josie" | Hoppus | 3:20 |
| 12. | "A New Hope" | Hoppus | 3:45 |
| 13. | "Degenerate" | DeLonge | 2:28 |
| 14. | "Lemmings" | Hoppus | 2:38 |
| 15. | "I'm Sorry" | DeLonge | 5:37 (Note: The version of "I'm Sorry" on the Japanese and Australian editions of Dude Ranch is 4:30 in length.) |
| Total length: | | | 44:54 |

Japanese and Australian version
| No. | Title | Lead vocals | Length |
|---|---|---|---|
| 16. | "Dog Lapping" (hidden track) | Hoppus | 7:07 |
| Total length: | | | 50:53 |

== Personnel ==
Blink-182

- Mark Hoppus – bass, vocals
- Tom DeLonge – guitars, vocals
- Scott Raynor – drums

Additional musicians

- Mark Trombino – piano, keyboards
- Scott Russo – backing vocals

Production

- Mark Trombino – production, recording, mixing (all except "Pathetic", "Boring", "Enthused", "Josie", "A New Hope" and "I'm Sorry")
- Donnell Cameron – mixing ("Pathetic", "Boring", "Enthused", "Josie", "A New Hope" and "I'm Sorry")
- Brian Gardner – mastering

Artwork

- Tim Stedman – art direction, design
- Lou Beach – cover illustration
- Ashley Pigford – design
- Steve Shea – band photos
- Victor Gastelum – disc art
- Carl Otto – skateboard art, design

== Charts ==
=== Weekly charts ===
Weekly chart performance for Dude Ranch
| Chart (1997–2002) | Peak position |
|---|---|
| Australian Albums (ARIA) | 25 |
| Scottish Albums (Official Charts) | 88 |
| UK Albums (Official Charts) | 100 |
| UK Rock & Metal Albums (Official Charts) | 16 |
| US Billboard 200 | 67 |
| US Heatseekers Albums (Billboard) | 1 |

=== Year-end charts ===
Year-end chart performance for Dude Ranch
| Chart (1998) | Position |
|---|---|
| Australian Albums (ARIA) | 46 |
| US Billboard 200 | 156 |

| Chart (2002) | Position |
|---|---|
| Canadian Alternative Albums (Nielsen SoundScan) | 183 |
| Canadian Metal Albums (Nielsen SoundScan) | 93 |

== Certifications ==
| Region | Certification | Certified units/sales |
|---|---|---|
| Australia (ARIA) | Platinum | 70,000^{^} |
| Canada (Music Canada) | 2× Platinum | 200,000^{^} |
| United Kingdom (BPI) | Gold | 100,000^{*} |
| United States (RIAA) | Platinum | 1,100,000 |
^{*} Sales figures based on certification alone.^{^} Shipments figures based on certification alone.
