= Josie (Blink-182 song) =

Single by Blink-182

from the album Dude Ranch
- Released: November 17, 1998
- Recorded: December 1996–January 1997
- Studio: Big Fish Studios (Encinitas, California)
- Genre: Skate punk; punk rock; pop punk
- Length: 3:19
- Label: MCA; Cargo
- Songwriters: Mark Hoppus; Tom DeLonge; Scott Raynor
- Producer: Mark Trombino

Blink-182 singles chronology
"Dick Lips" (1998)	"Josie" (1998)	"What's My Age Again?" (1999)

"Josie" (sometimes subtitled "Everything's Gonna Be Fine") is a song by American rock band Blink-182, released on November 17, 1998, as the fourth and final single from the group's second studio album, Dude Ranch (1997). "Josie", primarily written by bassist Mark Hoppus, envisions the ideal girlfriend and captures the thrill of young love. In addition to its romantic themes, "Josie" nods to the band's San Diego roots, referencing pop-punk peers (Unwritten Law and Dance Hall Crashers), as well as local chain Sombrero Mexican Food. It was the band's last single to feature drummer Scott Raynor.

The single, which was remixed by Tom Lord-Alge, reached number 31 in Australia. The single remix of "Josie" was later featured on the band's Greatest Hits. The music video stars Alyssa Milano as the titular character and depicts the band as high school students navigating adolescent life. Critics have praised "Josie" for its lyrical charm and melodic hooks, calling it a defining pop-punk love song. Over the years, the track has remained a fan favorite and has inspired covers by artists including Colleen Green and Adult Mom.

== Background ==
"Josie" is an ode to the perfect relationship companion. Bassist Mark Hoppus wrote the song imagining the ideal girlfriend; "It is about a common feeling that everyone can understand, which is being stoked on a girl," Hoppus told Billboard in 1998. In the song, Hoppus sings: "she's so smart and independent / I don't think she needs me / quite half as much as I know I need her."

The trio recorded a demo of the song with Warren Fitzgerald of the Vandals; this edition is featured in the 1996 surf film Drifting, directed by filmmaker Taylor Steele. Its final version was recorded with producer Mark Trombino for the band's second album, Dude Ranch, between 1996–97. The band wrote a spiritual sequel to the song, "Online Songs", for their 2001 album Take Off Your Pants and Jacket.

The song is composed in the key of B major and is set in time signature of common time with a very fast tempo of 200 beats per minute. Hoppus's vocal range spans from G#_{3} to F#_{4}. In Australia, the song spent eight weeks in the top 50 and 24 weeks in the top 100, where it peaked at number 31 on July 6.

=== References ===
"Josie" boasts several pop culture references. Though the song is fictional, it was named after a dog owned by Elyse Rogers, vocalist for ska-punk quartet Dance Hall Crashers, whom Hoppus dated in the mid-1990s. Hoppus namedrops the band, as well as fellow Poway pop-punkers Unwritten Law, in the lyric "My girlfriend likes UL and DHC". The song also alludes to Sombrero Mexican Food, a restaurant chain in San Diego, that the trio ate at frequently when recording. The group later partnered with the chain with the lyrics emblazoned on shirts. In the song's chorus, Hoppus depicts a scene where he returns home to his girlfriend, who is up waiting for him and watching National Lampoon's Vacation.

== Music video ==
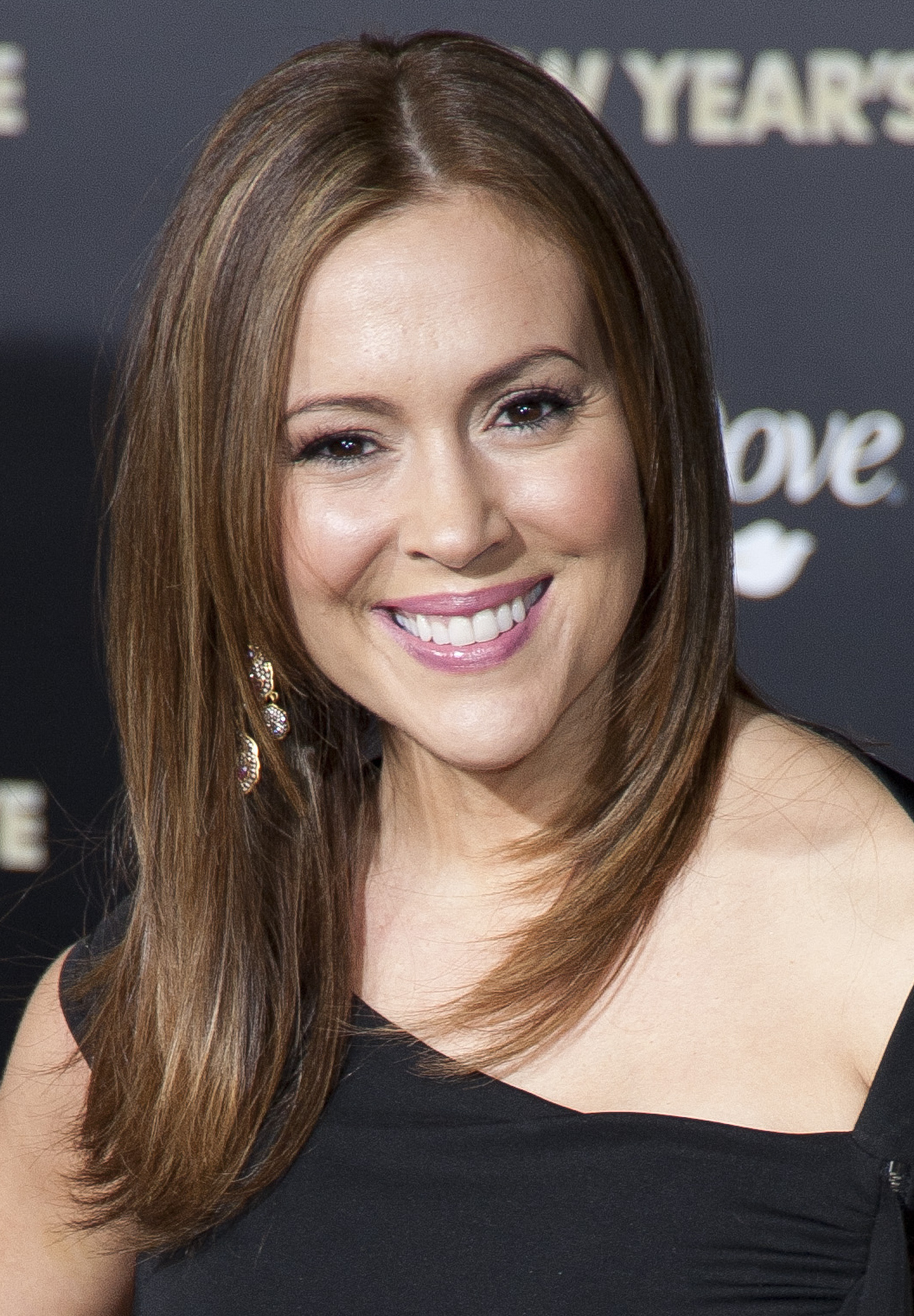
The video stars Alyssa Milano as "Josie".

For the group's third music video, the band attempted to take a more serious route and turned to director Jason Matzner and his collaborator Brendan Lambe. Hoppus' original idea was that the band would be playing on the deck of an old cruise liner as it sank. The band would play in real time as everything around them exploded in slow motion. Gradually, the ship would reach catastrophe ("people running, sparks flying, superstructure collapsing") before the ship sinks into the dark waters as the songs ends with the line "everything's gonna be fine." As that video would have cost the band's label, MCA, millions of dollars, an alternative was settled on: the band is performing in a basement when one musician hits a pipe with his guitar, causing the room to flood. The video was shot in the Universal Studios Lot and was director Matzner's first video. "Filming the first 'Josie' video was awful," Hoppus remembered in 2000. "We had to bring old equipment that we were willing to ruin." The trio were unhappy with the shockingly cold water, and DeLonge cut his head open on shrapnel that was floating around in water. When the band received the first edit, the band members decided to scrap it and start over. A snippet of the original video surfaced online in 2011.

The final music video for "Josie" was directed by Darren Doane, who also shot the videos for "M+M's" and "Dammit". It did not receive extensive MTV play, unlike its predecessor. The video depicts the members as students in high school, and stars Alyssa Milano as the object of Hoppus' affection. Milano was cast as an It Girl type, and was a rising star due to her role on the soap opera Melrose Place. The clip was filmed at Westlake High School, in Thousand Oaks, California. Though the trio play adolescents in the video, they were far from high school: Hoppus was 25 when he filmed the clip. A food fight scene was completed in one take by necessity, as the cafeteria was destroyed afterward. "All those kids had to sit around all day outside in the summer and, at the end of the day, they were rewarded by letting them nail us with tons of food," said Hoppus. In contrast to the song's point, the video has been interpreted as preoccupied with homosociality: scenes take place in locker rooms, and one male student confuses a paper airplane love note as intended for him. Spencer Kornhaber, writing for The Atlantic, mentions those moments in context with the band's public image: "The truth is that the band members weren't bored with sex; it's just that their own bromance often fascinated them more."

== Reception ==
"Josie" was one of the band's first breakout hits, preceded by the album's main single, "Dammit". While not one of the band's best-known singles, "Josie" remains a fan favorite. Music critics have complimented the song. Maria Sherman of Rolling Stone observed the "sweet" song's comical tone "conceal[s] real poignancy." Molly Lambert at MTV described the tune as a summary of "that totally crushed-out teenage feeling [...] That deeply romantic streak is what set Blink-182 apart." Chris Payne, writing for Billboard in 2023, called it a "holy text" of the genre and included it as its third-best love song, remarking, "'Josie' set the mold for the modern pop-punk love song"; in another ranking, he included it among the best singles of 1998. Matt Mitchell of Paste included it among the band's greatest, commenting: "The pedestal he's put his unnamed lover on is problematic in how it idealizes her, but there’s a subtle adoration alive here that still makes the track sing."

The song was covered by singer-songwriter Colleen Green in 2019, and by indie rock band Adult Mom in 2020.

== Format and track listing ==
US CD (1998)

1. "Josie" (Tom Lord-Alge remix; radio edit) – 3:06
2. "Wasting Time" – 2:44
3. "Carousel" – 3:12
4. "I Won't Be Home for Christmas" – 3:17

Australian CD (1998)

1. "Josie" (Tom Lord-Alge remix) – 3:23
2. "Untitled" (Live) – 3:05
3. "Dammit" (Live) – 2:58
4. "Does My Breath Smell?" (Live) – 2:25
5. "Wasting Time" (Live) – 4:06

The versions of "Josie" released for radio were remixed by Tom Lord-Alge; the Australian CD features the full version while the US CD contains the shorter radio edit. The live tracks on the Australian CD single were recorded at dates on Warped Tour 1997.

== Personnel ==
Blink-182

- Mark Hoppus – bass, lead vocals
- Tom DeLonge – guitars, backing vocals
- Scott Raynor – drums

Additional musician

- Scott Russo – backing vocals

Production

- Mark Trombino – production, recording
- Donnell Cameron – mixing
- Brian Gardner – mastering

== Charts ==
Chart (1998)	Peak position
Australia (ARIA)	31
US Alternative (Radio & Records)	50
