= Pop Disaster Tour =

2002 concert tour by Blink-182 and Green Day

- Continental tour by Blink-182 and Green Day
- Promotional poster for the tour
- Location: North America
- Associated albums: International Superhits!; Take Off Your Pants and Jacket
- Start date: April 17, 2002
- End date: June 17, 2002
- No. of shows: 47
- Supporting acts: Jimmy Eat World; Simple Plan; Saves the Day; Kut U Up
Green Day tour chronology
Life Without Warning Tour (1999–2000)	Pop Disaster Tour (2002)	American Idiot World Tour (2004–05)
Blink-182 tour chronology
Take Off Your Pants and Jacket Tour (2001)	Pop Disaster Tour (2002)	DollaBill Tour (2003)

The Pop Disaster Tour was a concert tour co-headlined by American rock bands Blink-182 and Green Day. It began in Bakersfield, California on April 17, 2002, and concluded in Minneapolis, Minnesota, on June 17. Set largely at arenas and outdoor amphitheatres, it encompassed 47 shows across the United States and Canada.

The tour came at a moment of peak popularity for pop-punk in the early aughts, and paired together its biggest names for a single tour. Despite sharing roots in California's punk scene, Blink-182 and Green Day differed significantly in their influences and approach. Their rumored rivalry made headlines, and the tour was conceived partly as a way to push back against that perception. The tour is notable for the onstage competition that developed between the two groups. Though billed a co-headlining affair—with both bands receiving equal billing—Blink-182 closed each evening.

While the bands generally got along, Blink's attempt at humor fell flat with critics, who often preferred Green Day's superior set. The Pop Disaster Tour as a whole grossed nearly $20 million. Support acts included Jimmy Eat World, Simple Plan, Saves the Day, and Kut U Up. The behind-the-scenes antics of the bands and their crews were captured in the documentary Riding in Vans with Boys (2003).

== Background ==
The Pop Disaster Tour teamed up two of pop-punk’s biggest acts: Blink-182 and Green Day. Although both bands hailed from California and were part of its punk scene, their backgrounds were distinctly different. Green Day, nearly a decade older, were rooted in the Bay Area's politically influenced culture. Blink-182, by contrast, embraced SoCal irreverence and earned a reputation as a more radio-friendly act. By the early 2000s, their respective fortunes had reversed—Green Day was in a commercial slump, and were preparing to release their greatest hits compilation. Blink, on the other hand, were enjoying their most profitable period, with their most recent LP, Take Off Your Pants and Jacket, becoming the first punk album to hit number one. Given their age, Green Day had obtained a reputation as "elder statesmen" of the pop-punk scene. These comparisons fueled a perceived rivalry in the press, particularly in Europe.

To challenge that perception, Blink-182 proposed a joint tour. Modeled after the famous Monsters of Rock festivals, the concept was essentially a "Monsters of Punk" tour. Blink manager Rick DeVoe said that he originated the idea of a joint tour. The bands shared an agent at the time, Darryl Eaton of Creative Artists Agency, and DeVoe—himself a longtime Green Day fan—believed the pairing made sense both artistically and financially. According to DeVoe, Green Day's management initially rebuffed repeated attempts by Eaton to discuss the proposal. DeVoe subsequently reached Warner Bros. chairman Tom Whalley through mutual acquaintances; Whalley recognized the potential of the pairing and helped persuade Green Day to participate, ultimately leading to the Pop Disaster Tour.

Early reports of the showdown were confirmed by spokespeople in January 2002, and the bands formally announced the tour in a joint appearance on MTV's TRL the next month. MTV sponsored the outing, alongside the newly released Xbox. Blink-182 were quick to offer praise for their forebears, acknowledging their impact: "They were a huge inspiration for us", Blink bassist Mark Hoppus said. Green Day, instead, frequently distanced themselves from their offspring. Frontman Billie Joe Armstrong declined an idea to cover each other’s songs, telling Rolling Stone he didn’t see much common ground between the two bands.

The tour featured an elaborate stage production that incorporated pyrotechnics. Blink's performance contained a drum solo by Travis Barker, performed on a rotating drum riser suspended by four cables above the stage. Barker said the stunt grew out of his desire to continually "step it up," explaining that the production team expanded on Tommy Lee's rotating drum concept by designing a rig that would spin him "six times forward and one time backward" during the performance.

Support bands included Jimmy Eat World, riding the mainstream success of Bleed American (2001), alongside rising acts Simple Plan, Saves the Day and Kut U Up. Kut U Up became known for their wild backstage antics, which were captured in the 2003 film Riding in Vans with Boys. The film was conceived by the Blink duo of Hoppus and guitarist Tom DeLonge, who brought in Matt Beauchesne—also behind their The Urethra Chronicles II documentary—to direct. It was intended as "a social experiment" to document what happens when an ordinary band spends two months touring with two of rock's biggest bands.

== Controversy ==
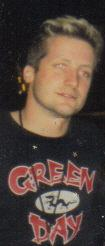
Green Day's Tré Cool, seen here on the tour in 2002, did not hide his disdain for sharing the stage.

While the mood behind the scenes was mostly jovial, the tour is infamous for the tensions it created between the two bands. Although marketed as a co-headlining tour, Green Day effectively played the role of opener ("we closed every show for a reason", Hoppus said). In his memoir, Fahrenheit-182, Hoppus suggests Green Day employed subtle tactics to assert dominance—such as a clause in their contract requiring them to perform only after sunset. Hoppus contends that Green Day would refuse to go on unless it was completely dark, and despite the delay, perform their full set. It put Blink in the position of having to shorten their setlist instead, due to curfew laws in some municipalities. DeVoe also recalled the friction; he specifically cited a show in Bakersfield where Green Day's set ran substantially beyond its allotted time, leading to a confrontation that he remembered as nearly becoming physical. Similarly, although pyrotechnics were initially planned just for Blink’s set, Green Day ended up using them as well. "I got the sense that Green Day fucking hated that they’d been reduced to opening for us", Hoppus said.

The musicianship between the two bands was more marked side-by-side. In a press release, Hoppus had jokingly predicted these comparisons, saying Blink planned to use "a bunch of fire and cool lights to distract people from our poor musical performance". However, the joke didn’t land with critics, who left unimpressed with Blink's headlining set. In a later interview, Green Day's Tré Cool acknowledged they had only committed to the tour as an opportunity to regain their status as a technically superior live act. Green Day's producer, Rob Cavallo, played a key role in developing the plan, emphasizing that their strength lay in their live performances: "Basically the idea was to blow Blink-182 off the stage every night", he confirmed. Cool claimed that "we heard they were going to quit the tour because they were getting smoked so badly [...] We didn't want them to quit the tour. They're good for filling up the seats up front."

For the most part, however, the bands got along well. Hoppus fondly remembered Armstrong bringing his family along for the ride, and Barker recalled little of the purported tension between the bands. He frequently jammed backstage with Armstrong and bassist Mike Dirnt. At the conclusion of the tour, Dirnt gave Barker a star-spangled bass guitar, which Barker later adopted as a frequently used instrument in his studio. Hoppus would later concede in his memoir that Green Day delivered the stronger performances and that the challenge ultimately pushed Blink to improve. Barker agreed, later characterizing Blink-182 as comparatively inexperienced and under-rehearsed for the outing. Green Day went on to write their 2004 rock opera American Idiot, which revitalized their career and solidified their place in rock history. The rivalry, however, has persisted: Blink-182 has repeatedly invited Green Day to tour together again, but each time, they refused to.

== Set list ==
Green Day

1. "Maria"
2. "Longview"
3. "Welcome to Paradise"
4. "Hitchin' a Ride"
5. "Brain Stew"
6. "Jaded"
7. "2000 Light Years Away"
8. "Knowledge"
9. "Basket Case"
10. "She"
11. "King for a Day / Shout"
12. "Waiting"
13. "Minority"
14. "When I Come Around"
15. "Good Riddance (Time of Your Life)"

Blink-182

1. "Anthem Part Two"
2. "The Rock Show"
3. "Dumpweed"
4. "Going Away to College"
5. "What's My Age Again?"
6. "Please Take Me Home"
7. "Happy Holidays, You Bastard"
8. "Adam's Song"
9. "First Date"
10. "Man Overboard" or "Carousel"
11. "When You Fucked Grandpa"
12. "Dysentery Gary" or "Story of a Lonely Guy"
13. "Family Reunion"
14. "Don't Leave Me"
15. "Stay Together for the Kids"
16. "All the Small Things"
17. "Everytime I Look for You" or "What Went Wrong"
18. "Reckless Abandon" (including Travis Barker drum solo)
19. "Dammit"

== Tour dates ==
List of 2002 concerts
Date	City	Country	Venue	Attendance	Gross
April 17, 2002	Bakersfield	United States	Centennial Garden	9,407 / 9,407	$294,580
April 19, 2002	Phoenix	United States	America West Arena	13,295 / 13,295	$405,860
April 20, 2002	Irvine	United States	Verizon Wireless Amphitheatre	26,543 / 32,492	$938,516
April 21, 2002	Irvine	United States	Verizon Wireless Amphitheatre	26,543 / 32,492	$938,516
April 23, 2002	Las Vegas	United States	MGM Grand Garden Arena	7,412 / 13,549	$259,420
April 24, 2002	Inglewood	United States	The Forum	12,795 / 15,162	$438,409
April 25, 2002	Chula Vista	United States	Coors Amphitheater	12,133 / 19,089	$307,947
April 27, 2002	Mountain View	United States	Shoreline Amphitheatre	16,474 / 22,000	$488,279
April 28, 2002	Sacramento	United States	AutoWest Amphitheater	12,465 / 18,500	$328,519
April 29, 2002	Oakland	United States	Oakland Arena	8,751 / 14,595	$285,419
May 1, 2002	Tacoma	United States	Tacoma Dome	15,979 / 16,389	$543,830
May 3, 2002	West Valley City	United States	E Center	10,174 / 10,590	$324,917
May 4, 2002	Greenwood Village	United States	Fiddler's Green Amphitheatre	-	
May 6, 2002	Maryland Heights	United States	Riverport Amphitheater	11,735 / 21,252	$354,809
May 7, 2002	Bonner Springs	United States	Sandstone Amphitheater	10,974 / 18,000	$325,818
May 9, 2002	Dallas	United States	Smirnoff Music Center	18,700 / 19,501	$607,750
May 10, 2002	Selma	United States	Verizon Wireless Amphiteheatre	12,170 / 20,000	$349,443
May 11, 2002	The Woodlands	United States	Cynthia Woods Mitchell Pavilion	16,040 / 16,040	$542,710
May 13, 2002	Pelham	United States	Oak Mountain Amphitheatre	7,696 / 10,288	$190,132
May 14, 2002	Tampa	United States	Ice Palace	10,406 / 11,000	$320,933
May 15, 2002	West Palm Beach	United States	Mars Music Amphitheatre	13,376 / 19,571	$447,671
May 16, 2002	Orlando	United States	TD Waterhouse Centre	9,686 / 10,000	$315,182
May 18, 2002	Atlanta	United States	HiFi Buys Amphitheatre	13,649 / 18,558	$312,524
May 19, 2002	Raleigh	United States	Alltell Pavilion	10,463 / 20,090	$266,988
May 20, 2002	Charlotte	United States	Verizon Wireless Amphitheatre Charlotte	7,916 / 18,850	$225,110
May 22, 2002	Virginia Beach	United States	Verizon Wireless Amphitheatre Virginia Beach	11,812 / 20,000	$373,237
May 23, 2002	Hershey	United States	Hershey Park Pavilion	17,505 / 20,827	$592,760
May 24, 2002	Holmdel	United States	PNC Bank Arts Center	16,930 / 16,930	$621,831
May 25, 2002	Burgettstown	United States	Post-Gazette Pavilion	-	
May 27, 2002	Hartford	United States	New England Dodge Music Center	-	
May 28, 2002	Camden	United States	Tweeter Center at the Waterfront	-	
May 30, 2002	Wantagh	United States	Jones Beach Theater	-	
May 31, 2002	New York City	United States	Madison Square Garden	-	
June 1, 2002	Darien	United States	Darien Lake Performing Arts Center	-	
June 2, 2002	Mansfield	United States	Tweeter Center for the Performing Arts	19,900 / 19,900	$647,744
June 4, 2002	Saratoga Springs	United States	Saratoga Performing Arts Center	13,706 / 25,133	$395,215
June 5, 2002	Washington, D.C.	United States	MCI Center	-	
June 7, 2002	Toronto	Canada	Molson Amphitheatre	-	
June 8, 2002	Grand Rapids	United States	Van Andel Arena	-	
June 9, 2002	Columbus	United States	Jerome Schottenstein Center	-	
June 11, 2002	Auburn Hills	United States	The Palace of Auburn Hills	-	
June 12, 2002	Cuyahoga Falls	United States	Blossom Music Center	-	
June 14, 2002	Noblesville	United States	Verizon Wireless Music Center	-	
June 15, 2002	Tinley Park	United States	Tweeter Center	28,040 / 28,040	$875,488
June 16, 2002	Milwaukee	United States	Marcus Amphitheater	14,028 / 22,404	$361,000
June 17, 2002	Minneapolis	United States	Target Center	-	

== Reception ==
Many reviewers were unimpressed with Blink-182's headlining set following Green Day. "Sometimes playing last at a rock show is more a curse than a privilege […] Pity the headliner, for instance, that gets blown off the stage by the band before it. Blink-182 endured that indignity Saturday at the Shoreline Amphitheatre", a reporter for the San Francisco Chronicle wrote in 2002. "Blink came off as simply chaotic, tiring and convoluted noise [...] their trademark gross-out comedy on stage was surprisingly toned down throughout the performance – perhaps ashamed to seem juvenile following Green Day", wrote Tony Ding of The Michigan Daily. In his book Nobody Likes You: Inside the Turbulent Life, Times and Music of Green Day, author Marc Spitz compared Blink-182 headlining a tour with Green Day to "Frank Sinatra, Jr. headlining over Frank Sinatra."

The Pop Disaster Tour as a whole grossed nearly $20 million from 45 shows. It attracted 632,491 fans. Pop Disaster was the first concert for many future pop-punk stars, including Spencer Smith from Panic! at the Disco, and Jack Barakat of All Time Low, who remarked that it "changed [his] life forever".

== Personnel ==
Green Day

- Billie Joe Armstrong – guitar, harmonica, lead vocals
- Mike Dirnt – bass guitar, backing vocals
- Tré Cool – drums, percussion, additional vocals on "King for a Day" and "Shout"

Additional musicians

- Jason White – rhythm guitar, additional vocals on "King for a Day"
- Kurt Lohmiller – trumpet, additional vocals on "King for a Day"
- Marco Villanova – trombone, additional vocals on "King for a Day"

Blink-182

- Mark Hoppus – bass guitar, vocals
- Tom DeLonge – guitar, vocals
- Travis Barker – drums, percussion

== See also ==
- Hella Mega Tour
