= Take Off Your Pants and Jacket =

2001 album by Blink-182

Studio album by Blink-182
- Released: June 12, 2001
- Recorded: December 2000 – March 2001
- Studios: Signature Sound (San Diego); Larrabee West (Hollywood); Cello (Hollywood)
- Genres: Pop-punk; punk rock
- Length: 39:01
- Label: MCA
- Producer: Jerry Finn

Blink-182 chronology
| The Mark, Tom, and Travis Show (The Enema Strikes Back!) (2000) | Take Off Your Pants and Jacket (2001) | Blink-182 (2003) |

Blink-182 studio chronology
| Enema of the State (1999) | Take Off Your Pants and Jacket (2001) | Blink-182 (2003) |

Singles from Take Off Your Pants and Jacket
- 1. "The Rock Show" Released: May 7, 2001; 2. "First Date" Released: September 24, 2001; 3. "Stay Together for the Kids" Released: February 19, 2002

Take Off Your Pants and Jacket (abbreviated as TOYPAJ) is the fourth studio album by American rock band Blink-182, released on June 12, 2001, by MCA Records. Nearly a decade deep in their career, Blink-182 had reached mainstream, multiplatinum heights with their previous album, Enema of the State (1999). The band continued its partnership with producer Jerry Finn to record the majority of the album in their hometown of San Diego. Its title is a double entendre ("take off your pants and jack it").

Take Off Your Pants and Jacket reflects a band in transition – marked by evolving styles and personal friction – with the trio split on its direction. It was made while grappling with creative burnout and industry demands, with their label pushing them to meet its deadlines and expectations. The resulting album mainly stays true to their polished pop-punk style, with its crowd-pleasing anthems subtly expanding the band's palette with post-hardcore tones and emo touches. Its lyrics chronicle adolescence, with songs dedicated to the prom, fighting authority, and teenage parties. As part of its rollout, the band adopted more mature branding, reflecting a growing desire to evolve artistically and shed their silly reputation.

Upon its release, Take Off was a modern rock blockbuster, becoming the first punk album to hit number one in the U.S., and selling over 14 million copies globally. It produced three hit singles—"The Rock Show", "Stay Together for the Kids", and "First Date". The CD release featured three collectible versions, each with unique bonus tracks and band-member icons. Critics generally complimented its expansion on teenage themes, while others viewed it as its weakness. To support the album, the band co-headlined the Pop Disaster Tour with Green Day. A Y2K-era record, Take Off was part of a wave of loud and irreverent pop-punk that critics and musicians alike have cited as a lasting influence.

== Background ==
At the onset of the millennium, Blink-182 became one of the biggest international rock acts with the release of their third album Enema of the State (1999). It became an enormous worldwide success, moving over fifteen million copies. Singles "What's My Age Again?", "All the Small Things", and "Adam's Song" became radio staples, with their music videos and relationship with MTV cementing their stardom. It marked the beginning of their friendship with producer Jerry Finn, a key architect of their "polished" pop-punk rhythm; according to journalist James Montgomery, writing for MTV News, the veteran engineer "served as an invaluable member of the Blink team: part adviser, part impartial observer, he helped smooth out tensions and hone their multiplatinum sound." The glossy production set Blink-182 apart from the other crossover punk acts of the era, such as Green Day, and this style and sound made for an extensive impact that permeated its way through the Southern California punk scene and beyond, igniting a new wave of the genre.

Behind the scenes, the three were adjusting to this new lifestyle. "After years of hard work, promotion, and nonstop touring, people knew who we were, and listened to what we were saying ... it scared the shit out of us," said bassist Mark Hoppus. Each musician was now wealthy and famous, which brought both comfort and challenges: DeLonge reacted to fame with a desire for privacy, and both Hoppus and Barker had been the subject of stalking. It became a transitionary time for the group, adjusting to larger venues than before, including amphitheaters, arenas, and stadiums. At the beginning of the album's promotional cycle, the trio were driving from show to show in a van with a trailer attached for merchandise and equipment; by its end, they were flying on private jets. Hoppus recalled that "we had gone from playing small clubs and sleeping on people's floors to headlining amphitheaters and staying in five-star hotels." On top of that, Blink was no longer simply responsible for their van and merchandise — as a newly minted "big" band, their operation employed accountants, attorneys, lighting, technicians, crew, carpenters, and more. The pressure was on: “Every day, there were 15 semitrucks and 15 buses carrying a crew of 70 people, plus the extensive local-venue staff, all depending on the three of us," Hoppus wrote in his memoir, adding: "We were running a large business that supported an entire economic infrastructure. Millions of dollars were at stake every single night."

In the public eye, Blink became known for their juvenile antics, including running around nude; the band made a cameo appearance in the similarly bawdy comedy American Pie (1999). While grateful for their success—which the trio parlayed into various business ventures, like Famous Stars and Straps, Atticus Clothing and Macbeth Footwear—they gradually became unhappy with their goofy public image. In one instance, the European arm of UMG had taken photos shot lampooning boy bands and distributed them at face value, making their basis for parody appear thin. In response, a conscious effort was made to make the trio appear more authentic with their next album. However, the relentless pace also was wearing on the group, and the growing divide between art and commerce began to frustrate them. The band was rushed into recording the follow-up, as according to DeLonge, "the president of MCA was penalizing us an obscene amount of money because our record wasn't going to be out in time for them to make their quarterly revenue statements. [...] And we were saying, 'Hey, we can't do this right now, we need to reorganize ourselves and really think about what we want to do and write the best record we can.' They didn't agree with us." To satiate fans in the interim, the band issued a stopgap live album, The Mark, Tom, and Travis Show (The Enema Strikes Back!), displaying more of their high-energy antics, in November 2000.

== Recording and production ==
=== Pre-production ===
The band began pre-production in December 2000, using ideas they had been developing on the road over the past year. DeLonge joked to a BBC reporter that the material may not be so fresh: "About this time in our careers we start running out of guitar riffs and ideas, so we start pulling out of the archives," he laughed. They recorded demos at DML Studios, a small practice studio in Escondido, California, where the band had written Dude Ranch and Enema of the State. The group had written a dozen songs after three weeks and invited their manager, Rick DeVoe, to be the first person outside Blink-182 to hear the new material, which the band found "catchy [but with] a definitive edge". DeVoe quietly listened to the songs from the control room and generally avoided involving himself in the band's creative decisions, but recalled becoming increasingly concerned by the absence of an obvious "hit". Though he regarded the music as the band's domain, he worried that withholding his concerns could ultimately affect the album's sales and the band's commercial momentum.

Near the end of the session, he finally questioned the band about the lack of what he described as a "Blink-182 good-time summer anthem". DeLonge and Hoppus were furious, remarking, "You want a fucking single? I'll write you the cheesiest, catchiest, throwaway fucking summertime single you've ever heard!" Hoppus went home and wrote lead single "The Rock Show" in ten minutes, and DeLonge similarly wrote "First Date", which became the most successful singles from the record and future live staples. Hoppus likened it to "anti-thought", with the goal of not overthinking it – simply making something friendly and enjoyable for a wide audience. "In a way, they ended up being the most fun," he conceded.

While writing the album, Barker frequently commuted between his home studio in Riverside and Hoppus and DeLonge's homes in San Diego, with the trio regularly driving back and forth across Southern California to develop new material. The three also worked on the arrangements for at Barker's Famous Stars and Straps warehouse. Barker also proposed being promoted to official partner in the band; prior to 2001, he had been considered a touring musician only, and while he had arranged the songs on Enema, he received no publishing residuals. Hoppus and DeLonge obliged – they wanted his input on songwriting. Finn came into the process during the last week of pre-production, and was very fond of Barker's drum parts, which the other musicians found unconventional and "algebraic". Barker remembered going into the process was intimidating but exciting: "We had a lot more pressure on that album than we did before, when nobody seemed to be paying attention. We had this huge success, but that just made us feel like we had something to prove. Instead of saying, 'Let's write some simple songs that will be huge,' we thought we'd try something more technical and darker. We wanted to be taken seriously, and we wanted to challenge ourselves."

=== Recording ===
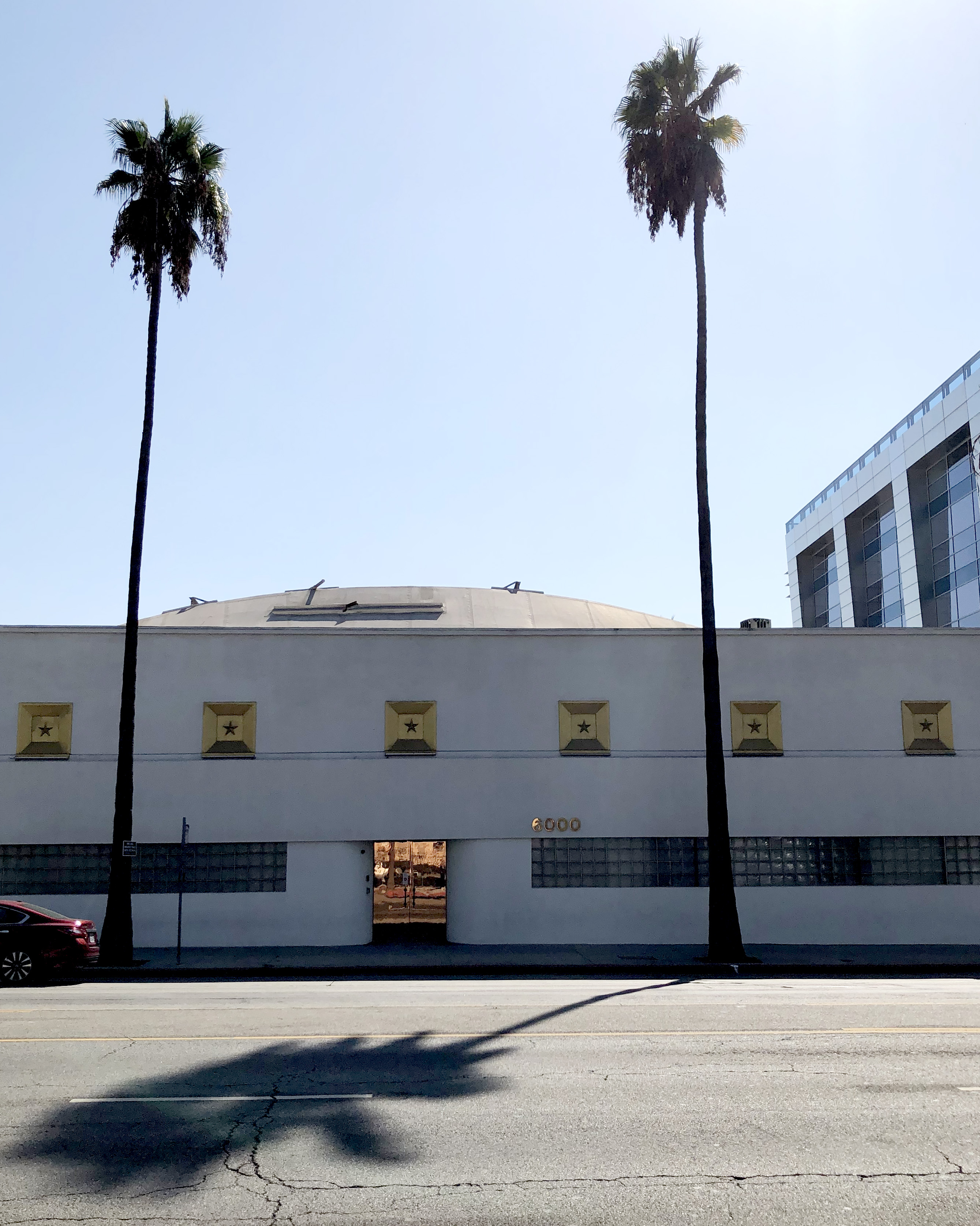
Some of Take Off was recorded at Cello Studios off Sunset Boulevard in Hollywood.

Take Off Your Pants and Jacket was recorded between December 2000 and March 2001. The band began proper tracking for drums not long after pre-production at Larrabee Studios West and Cello Studios in Hollywood. The working relationship with producer Jerry Finn had been so fruitful that the same team was largely engaged for Take Off Your Pants and Jacket, with Finn producing and Joe McGrath engineering. Barker recorded his drum parts in "two or three days" while DeLonge and Hoppus watched television upstairs. Barker recorded the songs from memory with no scratch tracks, largely in one take; Take Off was the first time he enabled a click track while recording to ensure timing. When the drums were finished, the band returned to San Diego to record the majority of Take Off Your Pants and Jacket at Signature Sound, where they had also recorded its predecessor. While the band worked with few days off, the sessions also proved to be memorable: "We took long dinner breaks, ate Sombrero burritos, watched Family Guy and Mr. Show, and laughed way too hard," said Hoppus.

The band later acknowledged that Take Off Your Pants and Jacket was shaped by label pressure to replicate the commercial success of Enema of the State. DeLonge said the pressure prevented the album from taking any "creative leaps [or] bounds," recalling that the band had begun bringing additional equipment into the studio in hopes of expanding its sound before rushing to complete the record. He later described the band's 2003 untitled album as the more ambitious work they had originally intended to make. Barker similarly said the album was completed under a contractual deadline before the band was "ready to be in the studio"; he noted the album was turned in before the band felt it was ready, explaining that they wanted more time to experiment in the studio. Despite the pressure, the band's sense of humor remained intact: when MCA executives visited San Diego to hear the new material, blink-182 jokingly pretended that the only songs they had recorded were "Fuck a Dog" and "When You Fucked Hitler" (later rewritten as "When You Fucked Grandpa"), leaving the executives "incredulous," according to DeLonge.

In 2013, Hoppus referred to Take Off Your Pants and Jacket as the "permanent record of a band in transition ... our confused, contentious, brilliant, painful, cathartic leap into the unknown." The creative struggle was evident from the outset. Hoppus loved everything regarding Enema of the State—including the music videos and live show—and "wanted to do it again," hoping to create a bigger, better and louder follow-up. DeLonge's guitar style was becoming dirtier and heavier; Arpeggiated guitar hooks became frenetic 1/16th note spasms," observed Hoppus. Meanwhile, drummer Travis Barker's were imbued a sense of hip-hop and heavy metal into his technique. Hoppus felt his lyricism was largely darker and more introspective: "love songs became broken love songs," he remembered. DeLonge rewrote some of his lyrics after listening to songs by Alkaline Trio, feeling as though he needed to elevate himself. Hoppus remembered that it was the first time the three had worked in opposition to one another, and noted that the sessions sometimes prompted arguments. He felt that the sessions created an unspoken competition between him and DeLonge, between who could write the superior lyrics: "Our confidence and insecurity begat some heated differences, sometime to the point where we had to leave rooms and cool down," he said in 2013. Finn helped to resolve these situations by offering fresh insights and good humor.

The band wrote two more songs in the studio; for these songs, Barker looped and filtered his parts and recorded the live drums after the fact. One of these songs became the single "Stay Together for the Kids", which was developed only one day before the album was turned over for mixing.

=== Technical ===
The engineering and post-production team behind Jacket remains largely unchanged from its predecessor. Finn and McGrath, exacting in acquiring the best sound, took two days to assess microphone placement, different compressors, and shifting EQs before committing Barker's drums to tape. Barker had technician Mike Fasano sit in and complete the drum tuning because he disliked waiting for Finn and his team. It was the last Blink album recorded on analogue tape; their next effort involved the emerging Pro Tools software. On the technical side, all of the vocals were recorded with Blue's Bottle condenser tube microphone. DeLonge augments his guitar setup with chorus pedals, flangers and delays – "just really light, tasteful touches", he felt. Barker used a variety of snare drums in his process, which he tuned tightly to his liking; the album uses brands like Ludwig Coliseum and Brady, and many came from Orange County Drum and Percussion. He liked using different snares to match what he felt the song required. To that end, the team rented a Tama snare called "Big Red" that Guns N' Roses used to make "November Rain".

According an EQ piece published after the album's release, Finn was so meticulous in quality that he A/B tested speaker wire from an independent hi-fi shop. Hoppus grew wary of the painstaking approach: "You go out and spend [hundreds of thousands of dollars] on the best recording equipment in the world just to record onto tape how bad of a musician you really are." Roger Joseph Manning, Jr. returns to add keyboard parts, while Tom Lord-Alge served as the mixing engineer, which was conducted at Encore Studios in Burbank. He typically worked out of his Miami space, but the band had him mix the album in California instead. The band also returned to work with Brian Gardner at Bernie Grundman Mastering in Hollywood. A writer for EQ magazine profiling Finn was present at the mastering session and characterized the atmosphere as "easygoing, the band was relaxed."

== Packaging ==
Each icon represents a song title; icon three is a condom, humorously representing the album's third track, "First Date".

The title is a tongue-in-cheek pun on male masturbation ("take off your pants and jack it"). Previous titles had included Epileptic Proctologist, If You See Kay (a pun on the spelling of "fuck") and Genital Ben, accompanied by a bear on the cover of the album. Stressed at being at a loss for a name, DeLonge asked guitar tech Larry Palm for suggestions. The album's title was coined by Palm, who was snowboarding on a rainy day. Inside the lodge, Palm was congregating with friends when a young kid walked in completely drenched, to which his mother suggested he "take off [his] pants and jacket." Palm was told by DeLonge that if the band were to use the name, he would "hook him up". Instead, Palm received a letter from manager Rick DeVoe for his contribution, which offered a $500 payout for the name. Palm scoffed at the amount, and filed suit in 2003 with the intellectual property attorney Ralph Loeb, alleging breach of contract and fraud against the band. Guitarist Tom DeLonge dismissed the claim in an interview, describing it as untrue and suggesting the lawsuit was motivated by financial reasons. Palm demanded $20,000; the band eventually settled out of court for $10,000. Journalist Joe Shooman called the title "a glint of sharp intelligence behind the boys' humour as it draws oblique attention to the fact that, latterly, Blink-182 had often been encouraged to get naked in order to promote themselves. It's a very self-aware album title in that context and a portent, perhaps, of what was to come".

The cover has three "Zoso-like" icons for each band member: a jacket, a pair of pants and an airplane. Delonge and Hoppus' symbols became the pants and jacket, respectively, leaving Barker the airplane despite begging his bandmates not to assign him the symbol, citing his fear of flying, but he took it anyway. CD copies of the album were initially released in three separate configurations for the first million printings: the "red plane", the "yellow pants" and the "green jacket" editions. Each release contained two separate bonus tracks, ranging from joke tracks to outtakes. The only outward signs to differentiate the three editions were three stickers. The concept was inspired by NOFX's Punk in Drublic, which had varying tracks on its corresponding cassette and CD versions. The idea was for each fan of the band to receive something special on their copy that they could then share with their friends. Executives hoped to market the three editions separately to boost sales ("buy all three"), but the band argued strongly against this tactic as they felt it was predatory to their fans. The multiple bonus-track versions were only available for a limited time before being replaced by an edition without any bonus tracks.

== Composition ==
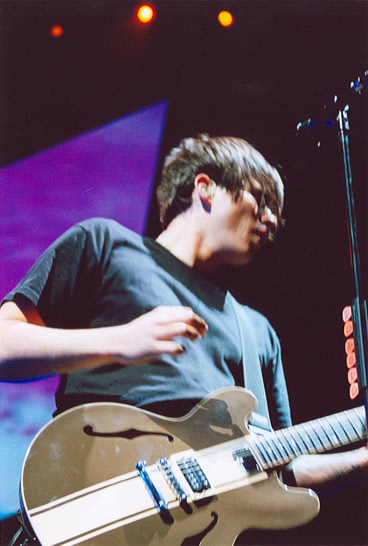
Tom DeLonge's guitar style becomes heavier on Take Off Your Pants and Jacket.

While Take Off Your Pants and Jacket fits squarely within the band's "commercial and conventional" pop-punk mold, it quietly introduces disparate elements into the band's sound. It ranges from bracingly fast-paced numbers to slower, more emo-indebted songs. Hoppus felt it was a "darker, harder album that pushed the boundaries of what blink-182 could do." Roger Catlin of the Hartford Courant said the album boasts "tight little anthems, with precision playing, staccato lyrics and sing-along choruses." Joshua Klein from The Washington Post described its familiar "sturdy pop elements — chiming guitars, exciting drums, endearing vocals and ear-catching chord changes."

DeLonge's droning guitar style was influenced by post-hardcore bands Fugazi and Refused. "As Blink grew, I wanted to contribute progressive elements: bring some modernism into the band and change what everyone thought we were capable of," DeLonge said. Part of that stemmed from the band's desire to illustrate they were not a boy band, as they felt had been marketed. Additionally, DeLonge's adenoidal vocal twang, with its "cartoonish California diction", is prominent. Barker's drumming is more technical than before; "Don't Tell Me It's Over" uses an Afro-Cuban bass drum and hi-hat pattern, and another song takes the beat from James Brown's "Funky Drummer". One song that developed midway through recording used looping for a danceable drum 'n' bass style. Barker used these affectations to differentiate the band from the rest of the pop-punk pack: "Every punk rock band sounds recycled," he confided to Modern Drummer in 2001. "It's the same recycled beats. Believe me, I know where you took that fill from. I'm trying to bring more to the table."

In interviews surrounding the album, Take Off Your Pants and Jacket was frequently presented as a more mature, introspective step for blink-182, emphasizing its emotional depth alongside the band's trademark humor. Hoppus, however, rejected the notion that the band had consciously written a more serious record, instead describing the album as a continuation of blink-182's longstanding balance between heartfelt songwriting and irreverent humor.

== Songs ==
I lived, ate, and breathed skateboarding. All I did all day long was skateboard. It was all I cared about. So I didn't notice too much [else going on]. When I got home [one] day, my dad's furniture was gone, my mom was inside crying and everything just erupted at that point. I was 18, sitting in my driveway when it all went down. So I just took everything from that day and put it into a song.

— Tom DeLonge on "Stay Together for the Kids"

"Stay Together for the Kids
"Stay Together for the Kids" showcases a quiet verse/loud chorus dynamic, and is lyrically about divorce.

"Everytime I Look for You"
Bassist Mark Hoppus called "Everytime I Look for You" the most obvious combination of the band's disparate elements, including "distorted drone guitar, poppier verses and chorus, [and] punk to bombastic [drums]."

Take Off Your Pants and Jacket has been called a concept album chronicling adolescence and associated feelings. The band did not consider them explicitly teenage songs: "The things that happen to you in high school are the same things that happen your entire life," said Hoppus. "You can fall in love at sixty; you can get rejected at eighty." The record begins with "Anthem Part Two", which touches on disenchantment and blames adults for teenage problems. It serves as the opposite of the band's typical "party" image presented to the media, with heavily politically-charged lyrics. Joe Shooman called it a "generational manifesto that exhorts kids to be wary of the system that surrounds them". "Online Songs" was written by Hoppus about "the thoughts that drive you crazy" in the aftermath of a breakup, and is essentially a follow-up to "Josie", whose name is dropped at the beginning of the song. "First Date" was inspired by DeLonge and then wife Jennifer Jenkins' first date at SeaWorld in San Diego. "I was about 21 at the time and it was an excuse for me to take her somewhere because I wanted to hang out with her," said DeLonge. The track was written as a summary of neurotic teen angst and awkwardness. "Happy Holidays, You Bastard" is a joke track intended to "piss parents off." The fifth track, "Story of a Lonely Guy", concerns heartache and rejection prior to the high school prom. The song is downbeat and melancholy, filtered through "tuneful guitar lines reminiscent of the Cure and hefty drum patterns".

The following track, "The Rock Show", is an upbeat "effervescent celebration of love, life and music". It was written as a "fast punk-rock love song" in the vein of the Ramones and Screeching Weasel. The song tells the story of two teenagers meeting a rock concert, and, despite failing grades and disapproving parents, falling and staying in love. It was inspired by the band's early days in San Diego's all-ages venue SOMA. The dysfunctional "Stay Together for the Kids" follows and is written about divorce from the point of view of a helpless child. Inspired by DeLonge's parents' divorce, it is one of the band's darker songs. "Roller Coaster" was written when Hoppus had a nightmare when he and his wife, Skye, first began dating; the song is about finding something ideal but fearing for its certain departure. "Reckless Abandon" was penned by DeLonge as a reflection on summer memories, including parties, skateboarding and trips to the beach. "Everytime I Look for You" has no specific lyrical basis, according to Hoppus, and "Give Me One Good Reason" was written about punk music and nonconformity in a high school setting. Spin columnist Tim Coffman called it "practically a pop-punk answer to "Come On Eileen" [...] "Many of the great pop-punk songs are about rallying against your parents. No one really talked about what to do once the rebellion was over, though." "Shut Up", a "broken-family snapshot", revisits the territory of youthful woes, described by Shooman as a "fairly familiar rites-of-passage tale" that "adds to general themes of isolation, alienation and moving on to a new place that pervade Take Off Your Pants and Jacket". "Please Take Me Home" concludes the standard edition of the album and was written about the consequences of a friendship developing into a relationship.

Several bonus tracks follow on separate editions; some continue the teenage theme, while others are joke tracks. Notably, "What Went Wrong" is an acoustic track; while DeLonge felt "staple acoustic songs" were big for groups at the time (such as Green Day's "Good Riddance"), the band wrote all of their songs from their inception on acoustic guitars, and he felt he would rather have "What Went Wrong" in its original form. "You grow up and realize, 'Fuck! Who gives a fuck about punk rock?'" he said. "There are so many great forms of music out there, and you grow beyond wanting to listen to or write something because your parents will hate it." Producer Jerry Finn suggested lyrics for the song after viewing a documentary on the first Soviet nuclear test; in the film, an aged Soviet physicist says of watching the explosion, "There was a loud boom, and then the bomb began fiercely kicking at the world."

== Promotion ==
Following the success of Enema of the State, band manager Rick DeVoe viewed his primary responsibility as maintaining the band's momentum into Take Off Your Pants and Jacket, including ensuring that the group continued producing strong singles while sustaining touring and merchandise sales. To promote Take Off Your Pants and Jacket, MCA Records released three singles: "The Rock Show", "First Date" and "Stay Together for the Kids", all of which were top-ten hits on Billboard's Modern Rock Tracks chart. The band recorded a television commercial for the LP, starring Hoppus as a proctologist and Barker as his patient. Blink-182 performed on the Late Show with David Letterman and Late Night with Conan O'Brien in support of Take Off Your Pants and Jacket. The band also appeared in a MADtv sketch, in which the trio stars as misfits in an all-American 1950s family in a parody Leave It to Beaver. The trio also sanctioned a band biography, Tales from Beneath Your Mom (2001), which was written by the trio and Anne Hoppus (sister of Mark Hoppus).

Additionally, the band undertook a series of in-store CD signings, at chains like Tower Records and CD World. They also stopped by mom-and-pop record shops, as part of a targeted campaign to "game" the charts to win a number-one debut. "The way album sales were measured, you had to spread them out. Some sales were weighted more than others. [...] It was a whole complicated system that every label was trying to game, but it’s how you got the numbers," Hoppus remembered in his book. The band continued to partner with MTV, making several appearances on Total Request Live; Hoppus guest-hosted the 2001 MTV Movie Awards Pre-Show with Beyoncé.

== Commercial performance ==
Blink-182 presented with their Canadian double platinum plaques for "Take Off Your Pants and Jacket".

Take Off was a marquee rock release of the season, alongside acts like Staind and Tool; writer Jim DeRogatis of the Chicago Sun-Times viewed it an "unlikely modern-rock radio blockbuster in an era otherwise dominated by vapid nu-metal." Like many high profile releases of the era, Take Off Your Pants and Jacket was leaked on the Internet prior to release. The album's leak is mentioned in the book How Music Got Free, which profiles the warez group Rabid Neurosis, as well as the North Carolina CD manufacturing facility from which the album leaked. Steven Hyden, in a piece for Uproxx, recounts its leak in the context of record company greed, opining that "Take Off Your Pants And Jacket is a particularly apt signifier of this unceremonious crash-and-burn climax to a depraved and decadent time."

At any rate, the assured success allowed the band, according to Brittany Spanos at Rolling Stone to "fully settle into their status as one of the biggest rock bands in the world." "There's nowhere to go but down," Hoppus joked. The album debuted at number one on the US Billboard 200 chart, with first-week sales of 350,000 copies. Billboard attributed the success of the record overall as a result of the success of the first single, "The Rock Show". The album debuted at number one on the Canadian Albums Chart, selling 47,390 copies. It also reached number one on Germany's Top 100 Albums. The album was the first album by a punk rock band to debut at number one in the United States. The record shipped enough units to be certified platinum, and it sold through those million copies by August. It was later certified double platinum in May 2002. It had moved three million units worldwide by December. Take Off Your Pants and Jacket is the second-highest selling album in the band's catalogue, and has sold over 14 million copies worldwide.

Take Off Your Pants and Jacket was the first punk album to reach number one in the United States, an achievement widely noted as a milestone for the genre. Prior punk albums, such as Never Mind the Bollocks, Here's the Sex Pistols (1977), had hit the top spot on the UK Albums Chart, but not Stateside. Jessica Lynch of Billboard observed that Blink-182's "landmark album rewrote the rules of what punk rock could achieve commercially."

== Critical reception ==
Professional ratings
Aggregate scores
| Source | Rating |
|---|---|
| Metacritic | 69/100 |
Review scores
| Source | Rating |
| AbsolutePunk | 95% |
| AllMusic | 4/5 stars |
| Christgau’s Consumer Guide | A− |
| Entertainment Weekly | C+ |
| Playlouder | 4/5 stars |
| Q | 3/5 stars |
| Rock Hard | 7.5/10 |
| Rolling Stone | 4/5 stars |
| Slant Magazine | 2/5 stars |
| Sputnikmusic | 4.0/5 |

Rob Sheffield of Rolling Stone was generally the most effusive of the positive reviews, praising the unpretentious attitude of the band: "As they plow in their relatively un-self-conscious way through the emotional hurdles of lust, terror, pain and rage, they reveal more about themselves and their audience than they even intend to, turning adolescent malaise into a friendly joke rather than a spiritual crisis." Darren Ratner of AllMusic felt likewise, writing that the record is "one of their finest works to date, with almost every track sporting a commanding articulation and new-school punk sounds. They've definitely put a big-time notch in the win column". People commended the "adrenaline-laced sonic gems reveling in Blink's patented, potty-mouthed humor, recommended only for adolescents of all ages". British publication Q offered the sentiment that "when they stop arsing around for the sake of it, Blink-182 write some very good pop songs".

The Village Voice called the sound "emo-core ... intercut with elegiac little pauses that align Blink 182 with a branch of punk rock you could trace back through The Replacements and Ramones Leave Home, to the more ethereal of early Who songs". Aaron Scott of Slant Magazine, however, found the sound to be recycled from the band's previous efforts, writing, "Blink shines when they deviate from their formula, but it is awfully rare ... The album seems to be more concerned with maintaining the band's large teenage fanbase than with expanding their overall audience." Joshua Klein from The Washington Post felt it was stagnant, critiquing its formula and "cookie-cutter" approach. Kerrang!'s Ian Fortnam critiqued its lack of risks, its "money-in-the-bank commercialism. [It's] eminently hummable dummy-spitting tantrum rock for the emo generation." Entertainment Weekly felt similarly, with David Browne opining that "the album is angrier and more teeth gnashing than you'd expect. The band work so hard at it, and the music is such processed sounding mainstream rock played fast, that the album becomes a paradox: adolescent energy and rebellion made joyless". British magazine NME, who heavily criticized the band in their previous efforts, felt no more negative this time, saying "Blink-182 are now indistinguishable from the increasingly tedious 'teenage dirtbag' genre they helped spawn". The magazine continued, "It sounds like all that sanitised, castrated, shrink-wrapped 'new wave' crap that the major US record companies pumped out circa 1981 in their belated attempt to jump on the 'punk' bandwagon."

More recent reviews have subsequently been positive. Music critic Kelefa Sanneh complimented the album in a New Yorker profile: "Take Off Your Pants and Jacket is by turns peppy, sulky, and stupid—Blink-182 at its finest." Website AbsolutePunk, in part of their "Retro Reviews" project in 2011, called Take Off Your Pants and Jacket the band's best effort; reviewer Thomas Nassiff referred to it as "a transitory record for Blink-182, but you can't tell just by listening to it on its own. It's developed and it's full – it feels holistically complete, dick jokes and all". In 2005, the album was ranked number 452 in Rock Hard magazine's book The 500 Greatest Rock & Metal Albums of All Time. in 2021, Stereogum's Grant Sharples felt it improved on its predecessor; "it's an endearing time capsule [...] replete with refined songwriting and incredibly infectious hooks." Richard Blenkinsop of Reverb.com called the album "a masterclass in pop punk writing." Conversely, Hyden, in the aforementioned Uproxx article, suggests the album is middling: "[Take Off] had some hits but [is] also a record no fan would ever consider their best work."

=== Accolades ===
Accolades for Take Off Your Pants and Jacket
| Publication | Country | Accolade | Year | Rank |
|---|---|---|---|---|
| Kerrang! | United Kingdom | The 50 Best Rock Albums of the 2000s | 2016 | 14 |

* denotes an unordered list

== Touring ==
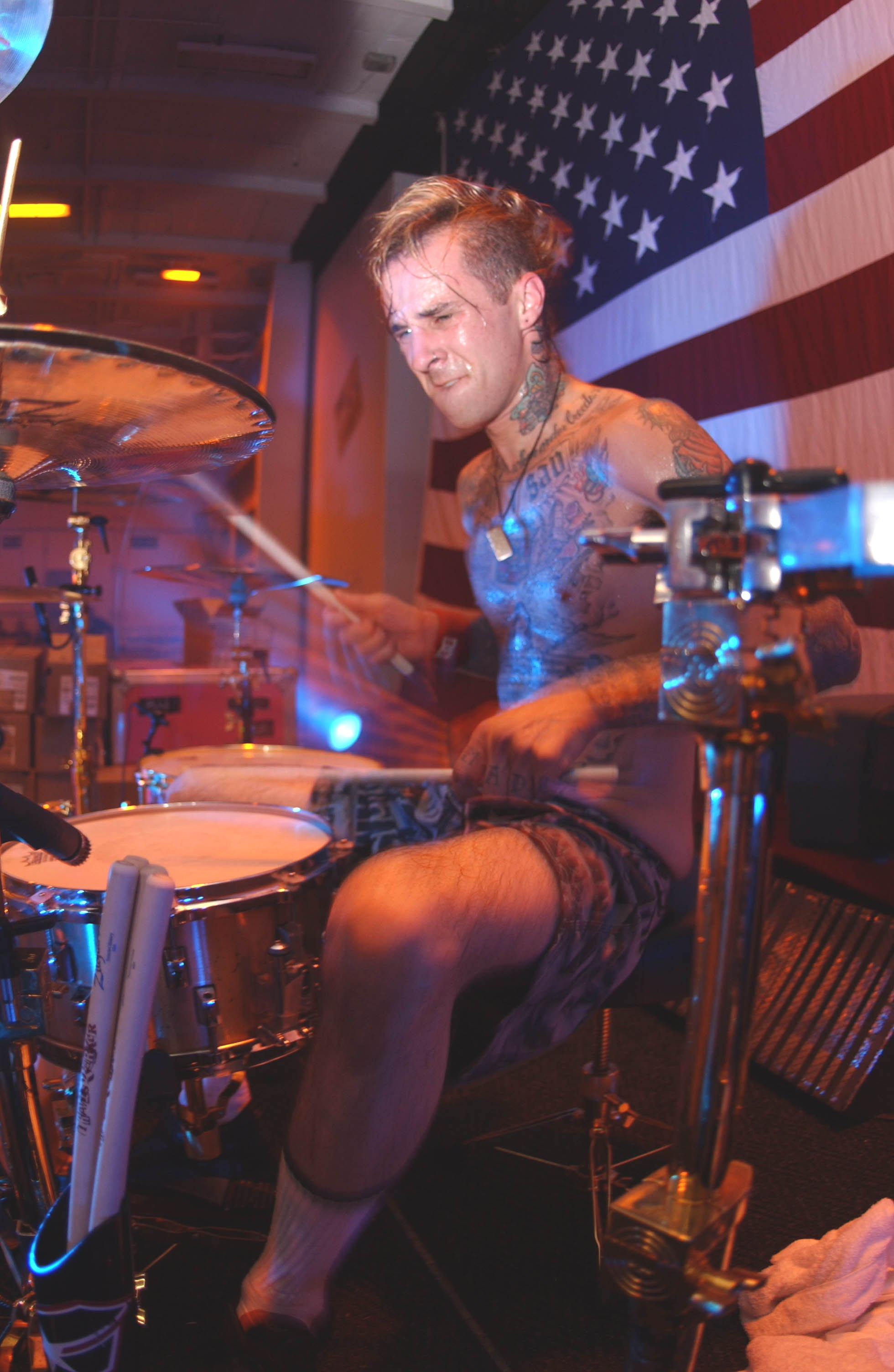
In the aftermath of 9/11, Barker performed with a red, white, and blue drum kit.

The Take Off Your Pants and Jacket supporting tour began in April 2001 in Australia and New Zealand. Afterwards, the band played two weeks of club shows at small venues across America in an effort to decrease ticket prices and get back to their roots. The band returned to the US to promote their new record on the Late Show with David Letterman in June 2001. Afterwards, the band set out on the 2001 Honda Civic Tour with No Motiv, Sum 41, the Ataris, and Bodyjar, for which the trio designed a Honda Civic to promote the company. The band again received criticism for "selling out", but the band argued by way of mitigation that their tickets were consistently offered at lower prices than those of other groups of their stature, and by accepting corporate links they could continue to give fans a good deal. Likewise, the band partnered with Ticketmaster, setting up a special website where fans could purchase pre-sale tickets for each show.

The main headlining tour visited arenas and amphitheaters between July and August 2001, and was supported by New Found Glory, Jimmy Eat World, Alkaline Trio and Midtown. Each show winkingly began with the overture of "Also sprach Zarathustra" and debuted a flaming sign reading "FUCK". The band had initially contacted Eminem in hopes of partnering for a tour, but he was too busy. For Barker, he would have preferred to tour with a stylistically different artist: "If it was my choice, we wouldn't tour with other punk bands," he said in 2001. In December 2001, the trio played at a series of radio-sponsored holiday concerts—which Barker liked because of their variety—and also appeared as presenters at the 2001 Billboard Music Awards in Las Vegas. The band rescheduled European tour dates in the aftermath of the 9/11 attacks. "After the attacks the world kind of went into freeze mode and we didn't know whether to carry on with things or not ... so we decided we'd rather everyone was safe and play the shows a little later instead," said Hoppus shortly thereafter. In the wake of the tragedy, the band draped an American flag over a set of amplifiers and drummer Barker played on a red, white, and blue drum kit. At one concert, DeLonge invited the crowd to join him in his cheers of "Fuck Osama bin Laden!" The European dates were canceled a second time after DeLonge suffered a herniated disc in his back.

In 2002, the band co-headlined the Pop Disaster Tour with Green Day. The tour was conceived by Blink-182 to echo the famous Monsters of Rock tours; the idea was to have, effectively, a Monsters of Punk tour. The tour, from the band's point of view, had been put together as a show of unity in the face of consistent accusations of rivalry between the two bands, especially in Europe. Instead, Green Day's Tré Cool acknowledged in a Kerrang! interview that they committed to the tour as an opportunity to regain their reputation as a great live band, as they felt their spotlight had faded over the years. "We set out to reclaim our throne as the most incredible live punk band from you know who," said Cool. Cool contended that "we heard they were going to quit the tour because they were getting smoked so badly ... We didn't want them to quit the tour. They're good for filling up the seats up front." Several reviewers were unimpressed with Blink-182's headlining set following Green Day. "Sometimes playing last at a rock show is more a curse than a privilege ... Pity the headliner, for instance, that gets blown off the stage by the band before it. Blink-182 endured that indignity Saturday at the Shoreline Amphitheatre," a reporter for the San Francisco Chronicle wrote in 2002.

The band released a second DVD of home videos, live performances and music videos titled The Urethra Chronicles II: Harder, Faster Faster, Harder in 2002. Likewise, the 2003 film Riding in Vans with Boys follows the Pop Disaster Tour throughout the U.S.

== Legacy ==
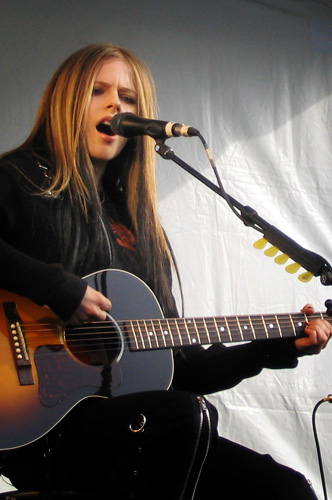
The album was a favorite of Avril Lavigne, an artist who arrived in its aftermath.

Take Off Your Pants and Jacket arrived at the apex of an early 2000s, pre-9/11 moment for youth culture. A 2001 Federal Trade Commission report condemned the entertainment industry for marketing lewd lyrics to American youth, specifically naming Blink-182 as among the most explicit acts. It debuted at the peak of a musical moment the band helped foment, a brand of snotty pop-punk popularized with bands following Blink's footsteps like Sum 41, Simple Plan and Good Charlotte, all of whom released seminal albums in 2001–02. Its songs became common on peer-to-peer sites like Kazaa and LimeWire, and its sound proved influential: its ubiquity made it a "sonic bible for many millennials" according to Kat Bein of Billboard. Others agreed: “If you're part of a certain twenty-something age bracket, you can recite every chorus [of the album]" replied Zach Schonfeld of The Atlantic. The album was an influence on artists like Avril Lavigne, Mod Sun You Me at Six, Knuckle Puck, and Neck Deep, who covered "Don't Tell Me It's Over" in 2019.

It also marked a transitionary period in the group, being the first time the trio began to fracture. Shortly after the album's release, the 9/11 attacks prompted a pause in the band's schedule, which led DeLonge to explore a slower, more heavy musical style—which became the album Box Car Racer (2002). Blink producer Jerry Finn naturally returned to engineer, and DeLonge, ostensibly trying to avoid paying a session player, invited Barker to record drums—making Hoppus the odd man out. It marked a major rift in their friendship: while DeLonge claimed he was not intentionally omitted, Hoppus nonetheless felt betrayed. "At the end of 2001, it felt like Blink-182 had broken up. It wasn't spoken about, but it felt over", said Hoppus later.

For the album's 25th anniversary, the band released limited-quantity merchandise honoring the album, and made available for the first time the six bonus tracks on streaming, which were formerly only available on physical formats.

== Track listing ==
All tracks are written by Mark Hoppus, Tom DeLonge and Travis Barker.

| No. | Title | Lead vocals | Length |
|---|---|---|---|
| 1. | "Anthem Part Two" | DeLonge | 3:48 |
| 2. | "Online Songs" | Hoppus | 2:25 |
| 3. | "First Date" | DeLonge | 2:51 |
| 4. | "Happy Holidays, You Bastard" | Hoppus | 0:42 |
| 5. | "Story of a Lonely Guy" | DeLonge | 3:39 |
| 6. | "The Rock Show" | Hoppus | 2:51 |
| 7. | "Stay Together for the Kids" | Hoppus/DeLonge | 3:59 |
| 8. | "Roller Coaster" | Hoppus | 2:47 |
| 9. | "Reckless Abandon" | DeLonge | 3:06 |
| 10. | "Every Time I Look for You" | Hoppus | 3:05 |
| 11. | "Give Me One Good Reason" | DeLonge | 3:18 |
| 12. | "Shut Up" | Hoppus | 3:20 |
| 13. | "Please Take Me Home" | DeLonge | 3:06 |
| Total length: | | | 39:01 |

Red Take Off version hidden tracks
| No. | Title | Lead vocals | Length |
|---|---|---|---|
| 14. | "Time to Break Up" | DeLonge | 3:07 |
| 15. | "Mother's Day" | Hoppus | 1:35 |

Yellow Pants version hidden tracks
| No. | Title | Lead vocals | Length |
|---|---|---|---|
| 14. | "What Went Wrong?" | DeLonge | 3:16 |
| 15. | "Fuck a Dog" | Hoppus/DeLonge | 1:26 |

Green Jacket version hidden tracks
| No. | Title | Lead vocals | Length |
|---|---|---|---|
| 14. | "Don't Tell Me It's Over" | DeLonge | 2:32 |
| 15. | "When You Fucked Grandpa" | Hoppus | 1:37 |

Notes

- On the clean version of the album the track "Happy Holidays, You Bastard" is listed as just "Happy Holidays", and is an instrumental with the exception of the very last line, due to nearly every other line containing strong language and/or crude sexual references.
- On the limited edition bonus track versions, "Please Take Me Home" has 182 seconds (roughly 3 minutes) of silence at the end, likely to hide the hidden tracks, which are not listed on the back cover, and also to reference the band's name.
- The clean version omits the second bonus track on each edition.
- The 25th anniversary edition includes all hidden tracks as bonus tracks.

== Personnel ==
Blink-182

- Mark Hoppus – bass, vocals
- Tom DeLonge – guitars, vocals
- Travis Barker – drums

Artwork

- Tim Stedman – art direction, design
- Marcos Orozco – design
- Justin Stephens – photography
- Intersection Studio – symbol design

Additional musicians

- Roger Joseph Manning, Jr. – keyboards

Production

- Jerry Finn – production
- Tom Lord-Alge – mixing
- Joe McGrath – engineering
- Joe Marlett – assistant engineer
- Ted Reiger – assistant engineer
- Robert Read – assistant engineer
- Femio Hernandez – mixing assistant
- Mike "Sack" Fasano – drum tech
- Brian Gardner – mastering

== Charts ==
=== Weekly charts ===
Weekly chart performance for Take Off Your Pants and Jacket
| Chart (2001–26) | Peak position |
|---|---|
| Australian Albums (ARIA) | 2 |
| Austrian Albums (Ö3 Austria) | 3 |
| Belgian Albums (Ultratop Flanders) | 15 |
| Belgian Albums (Ultratop Wallonia) | 8 |
| Canadian Albums (Billboard) | 1 |
| Danish Albums (Hitlisten) | 40 |
| Dutch Albums (Album Top 100) | 36 |
| European Albums (Music & Media) | 3 |
| French Albums (SNEP) | 13 |
| German Albums (Offizielle Top 100) | 1 |
| German Rock & Metal Albums (Offizielle Top 100) | 5 |
| Hungarian Albums (MAHASZ) | 23 |
| Irish Albums (IRMA) | 10 |
| Italian Albums (FIMI) | 4 |
| Japanese Albums (Oricon) | 31 |
| New Zealand Albums (RMNZ) | 10 |
| Norwegian Albums (VG-lista) | 15 |
| Scottish Albums (Official Charts) | 4 |
| Swedish Albums (Sverigetopplistan) | 26 |
| Swiss Albums (Schweizer Hitparade) | 4 |
| UK Albums (Official Charts) | 4 |
| UK Rock & Metal Albums (Official Charts) | 1 |
| US Billboard 200 | 1 |

=== Year-end charts ===
2001 year-end chart performance for Take Off Your Pants and Jacket
| Chart (2001) | Position |
|---|---|
| Australian Albums (ARIA) | 49 |
| Belgian Albums (Ultratop Flanders) | 74 |
| Canadian Albums (Nielsen SoundScan) | 19 |
| European Albums (Music & Media) | 63 |
| French Albums (SNEP) | 139 |
| German Albums (Offizielle Top 100) | 45 |
| Swiss Albums (Schweizer Hitparade) | 47 |
| UK Albums (OCC) | 67 |
| US Billboard 200 | 62 |
| Worldwide Albums (IFPI) | 29 |

2002 year-end chart performance for Take Off Your Pants and Jacket
| Chart (2002) | Position |
|---|---|
| Canadian Albums (Nielsen SoundScan) | 139 |
| Canadian Alternative Albums (Nielsen SoundScan) | 44 |
| US Billboard 200 | 154 |

== Certifications ==
Certifications and sales for Take Off Your Pants and Jacket
| Region | Certification | Certified units/sales |
|---|---|---|
| Australia (ARIA) | Platinum | 70,000^{^} |
| Brazil (Pro-Música Brasil) | Gold | 50,000^{*} |
| Canada (Music Canada) | 2× Platinum | 200,000^{^} |
| Denmark (IFPI Danmark) | Gold | 10,000^{‡} |
| Germany (BVMI) | Gold | 150,000^{‡} |
| Italy (FIMI) Sales + streams since 2009 | Gold | 25,000^{‡} |
| Japan (RIAJ) | Gold | 100,000^{^} |
| Switzerland (IFPI Switzerland) | Gold | 20,000^{^} |
| United Kingdom (BPI) | Platinum | 300,000^{*} |
| United States (RIAA) | 2× Platinum | 2,000,000^{^} |
^{*} Sales figures based on certification alone.^{^} Shipments figures based on certification alone.^{‡} Sales+streaming figures based on certification alone.

== See also ==
- List of number-one albums of 2001 (U.S.)
