= The Urethra Chronicles II: Harder, Faster Faster, Harder =

2002 American documentary

Video by Blink-182
- Released: May 7, 2002
- Length: 48:00
- Language: English
- Label: Universal Music & Video Distribution, Inc.
- Director: Matthew Beauchesne, Jeffery Motyll, Marc "Cheetah" Steinberger

Blink-182 video chronology
The Urethra Chronicles (1999)	The Urethra Chronicles II: Harder, Faster Faster, Harder (2002)	Greatest Hits (2005)

The Urethra Chronicles II: Harder, Faster Faster, Harder is a documentary about pop punk band Blink-182. It is the follow-up to the first Urethra Chronicles. The DVD was released by MCA Records on May 7, 2002, and contains music videos, bonus footage, making of videos, band biographies, and other bonus content.

== Contents ==
The Urethra Chronicles II: Harder, Faster Faster, Harder
No.	Title	Length
1.	"Opening"	1:46
2.	"Travis"	3:14
3.	"Tom"	2:32
4.	"Mark"	2:33
5.	"Past, Present, and the Paranormal"	4:06
6.	"Sin City"	1:36
7.	"Making of "The Rock Show""	3:04
8.	"Tour Life"	9:29
9.	"Backstage"	6:18
10.	"Making of "Stay Together for the Kids""	3:11
11.	"Recording Studio"	4:05
12.	"Making of "First Date""	3:35
13.	"Friends"	8:08
14.	"Credits"	4:23

Music videos
No.	Title	Length
15.	"The Rock Show"	3:15
16.	"First Date"	3:38
17.	"Stay Together for the Kids"	4:01
18.	"Stay Together for the Kids" (original version)	4:12

Live in Chicago, July 7, 2001
No.	Title	Length
19.	"First Date"	2:53
20.	"Carousel"	2:41
21.	"Aliens Exist"	3:00
22.	"The Rock Show"	3:11
23.	"Anthem Part Two"	3:44

Management
No.	Title	Length
24.	"Rick DeVoe"	2:37
25.	"Chris Georggin"	0:43
26.	"Kristen Worden"	1:13

Bonus content
No.	Title	Length
27.	"Photo Gallery"	– –
28.	"Do You Believe?"	3:25
29.	"Mark Undercover"	1:52
30.	"The Battle of the Enchanted Forest"	2:49
31.	"Doctor Brian"	2:58
32.	"Making of "Stay Together for the Kids"" (original version)	4:14
33.	"1216 Beats"	1:45
34.	"A Message to Our Fans"	2:07

== Charts ==
Chart (2002)	Peak position
Australia Top 20 DVD (ARIA)	9
US Top Music Videos (Billboard)	1
