= Take Off Your Pants and Jacket Tour =

2001 concert tour by Blink-182

- Continental tour by Blink-182
- Location: North America
- Associated album: Take Off Your Pants and Jacket
- Start date: July 4, 2001
- End date: September 21, 2001
- Legs: 1
- No. of shows: 45
- Supporting acts: New Found Glory; Jimmy Eat World; Alkaline Trio; Midtown

Blink-182 concert chronology
- 2001 Honda Civic Tour (2001); Take Off Your Pants and Jacket Tour (2001); Pop Disaster Tour (2002)

The Take Off Your Pants and Jacket Tour was a concert tour by the American rock band Blink-182, in support of the band's fourth studio album of the same name (2001). It began in Moline, Illinois on July 4, 2001, and concluded in Chula Vista, California on September 21, 2001. The tour encompassed 45 shows between the U.S. and Canada. The tour was supported by New Found Glory, Jimmy Eat World, Alkaline Trio and Midtown.

Announced in May 2001 shortly before the album's release, the tour was the band's second major arena and amphitheater headlining run, and featured an expanded production emphasizing large-scale set design and extensive pyrotechnics. Each concert opened pairing Richard Strauss's Also sprach Zarathustra with the reveal of a giant expletive on a flaming sign. This pairing of high-art orchestral grandeur with juvenile profanity became one of the tour's signature visual motifs.

Critical reception to the Take Off Your Pants and Jacket Tour was generally positive, with reviewers praising the band's musicianship, energy, and balance of humor and melodic performance. Several dates were rescheduled following the September 11 attacks. A planned European leg, initially delayed in the aftermath of the attacks, was later canceled after guitarist Tom DeLonge suffered a back injury.

== Background ==
The tour was announced in May 2001 in support of Take Off Your Pants and Jacket, which was released on June 12. In partnership with Ticketmaster, the band launched an exclusive online presale beginning May 17, 2001, allowing registered fans to purchase up to four tickets before the general public onsale. The promotion included a giveaway for an autographed Stratocaster guitar created by Fender specifically for guitarist Tom DeLonge. The band conducted backstage meet and greets for fans at some shows.

Ticket prices ranged from $12 to $32. Because of the tour's elaborate production, the band was required to perform in larger and more expensive venues, resulting in higher ticket prices than on previous tours. Despite this, Hoppus maintained that the group's tickets remained among the least expensive of the major arena acts touring the United States at the time. Speaking to Kerrang!, Hoppus joked, "Tickets are $25, and we still feel that's about 25 times what we’re worth," adding that "some people even bring ear-plugs to cancel out the music and just enjoy the lights."

The band's performances often featured extended onstage banter and improvisational comedy between songs, a hallmark of their live shows. In an interview at the time, Hoppus said the group did not follow a scripted routine, explaining that "sometimes we go onstage and hardly say any jokes at all, and some nights we'll end up having to cut songs out of our set because we end up talking so much." He also noted that the band had grown fatigued performing older material by that point in the tour cycle, stating that they were "excited to play the new songs" from Take Off Your Pants and Jacket after performing some earlier songs live for nearly a decade.

=== Production ===
The production for the 2001 Take Off Your Pants and Jacket Tour represented a major increase in scale and theatricality for the band. The shows incorporated extensive pyrotechnics, large-scale stage props, and elaborate visual effects. Each concert began in darkness as Richard Strauss' symphonic poem Also sprach Zarathustra—widely recognized as the theme from 2001: A Space Odyssey—played over the venue speakers. When the music reached its climax, the curtain dropped to reveal the band performing in front of a giant flaming sign displaying the word "FUCK". Bassist Mark Hoppus later recalled conceiving the deliberately juvenile-yet-grandiose concept while driving home from the studio late one night. "I had this idea where a huge obscenity would be spelled out in fire," he said to Rolling Stone. "And you have to go for the king daddy. You have to go with fuck." The prop later became a recurring feature of the band's arena productions, reappearing during their 2014 and 2016 tours.

According to Hoppus, the tour featured a "record-breaking" amount of pyrotechnics, including propane flame effects, cascading fireworks, and cold-spark effects positioned throughout the stage. The complexity of the production required precise coordination between the band and crew because of the numerous timed flame and pyrotechnic cues integrated into the performance. The tour marked a substantial logistical expansion for the group, traveling with approximately 15 semi-trucks, 15 buses, and a crew of around 70 personnel, in addition to local venue staff. The tour was managed by Jens Geiger, with production managed by Eric Fermin. Videos from across the tour were filmed by the band's videographer, Marc "Cheetah" Steinberger, and posted on their official website throughout the year.

=== Support acts ===
The shows were supported by was supported by New Found Glory, Jimmy Eat World, Alkaline Trio and Midtown. For New Found Glory, opening for one of their influences was exhilarating. "We always dreamed about touring with Blink ever since we started," frontman Jordan Pundik shared to Kerrang!. "The whole tour has been a blast for us," guitarist Chad Gilbert agreed.

=== Rescheduled shows and cancellations ===
The band postponed shows for the last few dates of the tour due to the September 11 attacks. When they returned, the band draped an American flag over a set of amplifiers and drummer Travis Barker played on a red, white, and blue drum kit. At one concert, DeLonge invited the crowd to join him in his cheers of "Fuck Osama bin Laden!" A European leg of the tour, initially scheduled for November 2001, was put on hold after the attacks. "After the attacks the world kind of went into freeze mode and we didn't know whether to carry on with things or not ... so we decided we'd rather everyone was safe and play the shows a little later instead," said Hoppus shortly thereafter. It was later rescheduled to January 2002, and later canceled altogether after guitarist Tom DeLonge suffered a back injury.

== Reception ==
Reception towards the Take Off Your Pants and Jacket Tour was generally positive. Jim DeRogatis of the Chicago Sun-Times was positive in his review of the band's concert at the Tweeter Center, writing, "There is a long and noble tradition in rock 'n' roll of hyperenergetic, ultramelodic, sha-la-la-la stupidity, and Blink has proven itself to be a worthy inheritor of this tradition—not as great as the mighty Ramones just yet, but at least as good as the Troggs or the Archies or Grand Funk Railroad." Tom Kielty of The Boston Globe wrote that blink-182 had matured into a more dynamic live act by successfully balancing its trademark juvenile humor with increasingly emotional material. He praised Barker's "powerful and precise" drumming and argued that the band's sincere performances of songs such as "Adam's Song" and "Stay Together for the Kids" demonstrated a newfound emotional depth without sacrificing its irreverent personality. Al Choman of The Tribune praised blink-182's "frenetic, unapologetic punk spirit," and noted that its catchy melodies and youthful themes resonated with its broad audience.

The band's appearance at Radio 104 Fest in Hartford, Connecticut was reviewed by Roger Catlin of the Hartford Courant: "Blink-182 [...] has earned its place at the top. Both bassist Mark Hoppus and guitarist Tom DeLonge are tighter now from working with ace drummer Travis Barker for a few years. The show's focus is more their bracing, melodic songs rather than the childishly vulgar banter between them." Ed Masley of the Pittsburgh Post-Gazette called the trio "the Steely Dan of cartoon punk", feeling that "the [dirty] jokes were nearly overshadowed by musical highlights [...] Some, I'm sure, would argue that the show was worse than reprehensible. But unlike, say, Limp Bizkit, Korn or Eminem, these clowns did it all for the giggles. At a time when so much of teen culture is focused on hate and aggression, last night's show was practically refreshing." Randy Lewis of the Los Angeles Times felt the concert tasteful in light of the then-recent September 11 attacks; "In some strange way Blink-182's concert Sunday at the Arrowhead Pond in Anaheim provided a kind of catharsis, or at least temporary escape, for the thousands of fans who turned out." He praised the group's inclusion of humor, while also comparing drummer Travis Barker to Keith Moon of The Who.

== Tour dates ==
List of 2001 concerts
Date	City	Country	Venue
July 4, 2001	Moline	United States	Mark of the Quad Cities
July 5, 2001	Milwaukee	United States	Marcus Amphitheater
July 6, 2001	Noblesville	United States	Verizon Wireless Music Center
July 7, 2001	Tinley Park	United States	Tweeter Center
July 9, 2001	Cincinnati	United States	Riverbend Music Center
July 10, 2001	Columbus	United States	Polaris Amphitheater
July 11, 2001	Cuyahoga Falls	United States	Blossom Music Center
July 13, 2001	Bonner Springs	United States	Sandstone Amphitheater
July 14, 2001	Somerset (Note: This concert was a part of the Warped Tour.)	United States	Rivers Edge Amphitheatre
July 15, 2001	Maryland Heights	United States	Riverport Amphitheatre
July 17, 2001	Burgettstown	United States	Post-Gazette Pavilion
July 19, 2001	Clarkston	United States	DTE Energy Music Theatre
July 21, 2001	Wantagh	United States	Jones Beach Theater
July 22, 2001	Wantagh	United States	Jones Beach Theater
July 23, 2001	Darien Center	United States	Darien Lake Performing Arts Center
July 24, 2001	Columbia	United States	Merriweather Post Pavilion
July 26, 2001	Holmdel	United States	PNC Bank Arts Center
July 27, 2001	Camden	United States	Tweeter Center at the Waterfront
July 28, 2001	Boston	United States	Suffolk Downs
July 29, 2001	Scranton	United States	Coors Light Amphitheatre at Montage Mountain
July 31, 2001	Raleigh	United States	Alltel Pavilion at Walnut Creek
August 2, 2001	West Palm Beach	United States	Mars Music Amphitheatre
August 3, 2001	Tampa	United States	Ice Palace Arena
August 5, 2001	Antioch	United States	AmSouth Amphitheater
August 7, 2001	Dallas	United States	Smirnoff Music Centre
August 8, 2001	The Woodlands	United States	Cynthia Woods Mitchell Pavilion
August 9, 2001	Selma	United States	Verizon Wireless Amphitheater
August 11, 2001	Greenwood Village	United States	Coors Amphitheatre
August 13, 2001	West Valley	United States	E Center
August 14, 2001	Nampa	United States	Idaho Center Amphitheater
August 15, 2001	Portland	United States	Memorial Coliseum
August 17, 2001	George	United States	The Gorge Amphitheatre
August 18, 2001	Vancouver	Canada	Thunderbird Stadium
August 21, 2001	Calgary	Canada	Pengrowth Saddledome
August 22, 2001	Edmonton	Canada	Telus Field
August 25, 2001	Toronto (Note: This concert was a part of "Edgefest II)	Canada	Molson Amphitheatre
August 26, 2001	Ottawa	Canada	Ottawa Civic Centre
August 28, 2001	Quebec City	Canada	Colisée Pepsi
August 29, 2001	Montreal	Canada	Parc Jean-Drapeau
August 31, 2001	Essex	United States	Champlain Valley Fairgrounds
September 1, 2001	Allentown	United States	Allentown Fairgrounds
September 2, 2001	Syracuse	United States	New York State Fairgrounds
September 3, 2001	Hartford (Note: This concert was a part of "Radio 104 Fest 2001")	United States	ctnow.com Meadows Music Center
September 8, 2001	Wheatland	United States	Sacramento Valley Amphitheatre
September 9, 2001	Mountain View	United States	Shoreline Amphitheatre
September 16, 2001 (Note: The show was originally scheduled to take place on September 13, but was rescheduled due to the September 11 attacks.)	Anaheim	United States	Arrowhead Pond at Anaheim
September 17, 2001 (Note: This show was part of the Oklahoma State Fair.)	Oklahoma City	United States	Jim Norick Arena
September 19, 2001 (Note: The show was originally scheduled to take place on September 12, but was rescheduled due to the September 11 attacks.)	Long Beach	United States	Long Beach Arena
September 20, 2001 (Note: The show was originally scheduled to take place on September 14, but was rescheduled due to the September 11 attacks.)	Phoenix	United States	Arizona Veterans Memorial Coliseum
September 21, 2001 (Note: The show was originally scheduled to take place on September 15, but was rescheduled due to the September 11 attacks.)	Chula Vista	United States	Coors Amphitheatre
