= The Urethra Chronicles =

1999 American documentary film

Video by Blink-182
- Released: November 30, 1999 (VHS); May 2, 2000 (DVD)
- Length: 62:00
- Language: English
- Labels: Universal Music & Video Distribution, Inc.
- Directors: Rick DeVoe, Jeffery Motyll

Blink-182 video chronology
The Urethra Chronicles (1999)	The Urethra Chronicles II: Harder, Faster Faster, Harder (2002)

The Urethra Chronicles is a 1999 documentary film about the American pop punk band Blink-182. The film, directed by former manager Rick DeVoe, is a behind-the-scenes look at the band's history featuring their usual toilet humor. The documentary includes exclusive live performance footage and music videos.

The film was released on November 30, 1999 on VHS and May 2, 2000 for DVD. A sequel, The Urethra Chronicles II: Harder, Faster Faster, Harder, was released in 2002.

== Background ==
The Urethra Chronicles was conceived during Blink-182's commercial breakthrough in 1999, following the release of their third studio album, Enema of the State. The band's growing popularity prompted the production of a home video documenting their early career and rise to mainstream recognition. Initially planned for release before Christmas 1999, the project was envisioned as a companion to Enema of the State, combining the band's music videos with previously unreleased concert footage and behind-the-scenes material. Guitarist Tom DeLonge initially proposed the title The Diary of the Butt. The film features footage shot over many years: for example, stunts shot by Hoppus and DeLonge during the recording of sophomore effort Dude Ranch in 1996 open up the film.

The documentary was directed by the band's manager, Rick DeVoe, who enlisted friends and crew members associated with surf filmmaker Taylor Steele to assist with production. Steele had maintained a longstanding relationship with Blink-182 through the Southern California punk and surfing scenes, having featured their music in his surf films and helped introduce the band to audiences beyond the local punk circuit. The resulting documentary adopted an informal, low-budget approach, interspersing concert performances and interviews with candid home movies of the band. Much of its material emphasized the group's irreverent humor, including practical jokes, nudity, and backstage antics.

== Contents ==
The Urethra Chronicles
No.	Title	Length
1.	"Intro"	4:10
2.	"Tom"	4:42
3.	"Mark"	5:02
4.	"Travis"	4:07
5.	"Travels"	6:09
6.	"Friends"	2:53
7.	"Credits"	2:49

Music videos
No.	Title	Length
8.	"Dammit"	2:50
9.	"Josie"	3:35
10.	"What's My Age Again?"	2:28
11.	"All the Small Things"	3:52
12.	"Adam's Song" (omitted on VHS version)	4:16

Live at the Electric Ballroom, November 30, 1999 (omitted on VHS version)
No.	Title	Length
13.	"What's My Age Again?"	2:36
14.	"All the Small Things"	3:21

Bonus content (omitted on VHS version)
No.	Title	Length
14.	"Photo Gallery"	– –
15.	Untitled (easter egg)	4:59

== Reception ==
Writing retrospectively for Kerrang! in 2019, Kieron Passaway characterized the film as a crude but nostalgic portrait of the band at the height of its early popularity, noting its unpolished production and emphasis on the personalities of Hoppus and DeLonge.

== Charts ==
Chart (2000–01)	Peak position
Australia Music Video (ARIA)	1
US Top Video Sales (Billboard)	8

== See also ==
- The Urethra Chronicles II: Harder, Faster Faster, Harder
- Riding in Vans with Boys
