= Stay Together for the Kids =

2002 single by Blink-182

"Stay Together For the Kids"

Single by Blink-182

from the album Take Off Your Pants and Jacket
- Released: February 4, 2002
- Recorded: January–March 2001
- Studio: Signature Sound (San Diego); Larrabee West, Cello (Hollywood, California)
- Genre: Pop-punk; emo; alternative rock
- Length: 4:07
- Label: MCA
- Songwriters: Tom DeLonge; Mark Hoppus; Travis Barker
- Producer: Jerry Finn

Blink-182 singles chronology
"I Won't Be Home for Christmas" (2001)	"Stay Together For the Kids" (2002)	"Feeling This" (2003)

Music video
- "Stay Together for the Kids" on YouTube

"Stay Together for the Kids" is a song by the American rock band Blink-182 from their fourth studio album, Take Off Your Pants and Jacket (2001). It was released as the third and final single from the album on February 4, 2002. The track shares writing credits between guitarist Tom DeLonge, bassist Mark Hoppus, and drummer Travis Barker, with DeLonge serving as its primary composer. The dark, emotionally charged ballad draws from the members' personal experiences with divorce. It balances quiet-loud dynamics with post-hardcore influences to heighten its emotional intensity.

Told from the perspective of a child caught in a collapsing household, the song reflects themes of family breakdown, emotional displacement, and adolescent frustration. The song's original music video, directed by Samuel Bayer, depicts the band performing in a suburban house being destroyed by a wrecking ball, serving as a visual metaphor for a broken home. The clip was re-shot following the 9/11 attacks, with both the band and label MCA deeming its imagery too similar to the collapse of the World Trade Center.

The song was produced by Jerry Finn. Critics responded positively to its emotional weight and tonal departure from the band's usual pop-punk style, while others noted its raw depiction of divorce as especially resonant for listeners from similar backgrounds. It was a hit on rock radio in the United States, where it peaked at number seven on the Modern Rock Tracks chart in 2001, and also reached the top 15 in the United Kingdom.

== Background ==
"Stay Together for the Kids" is written about divorce from the point of view of a helpless child. It was primarily written by guitarist Tom DeLonge and was informed by the separation of his parents when he was 18. The subject of fractured families resonated across the band. Bassist Mark Hoppus's parents divorced when he was a child, after which he divided his upbringing between them on opposite coasts of the United States. Hoppus later described the experience as formative to his understanding of family and parenthood, observing that growing older had made him recognize his parents as fallible. Drummer Travis Barker, though not a child of divorce, lost his mother as a teenager and later recalled the discomfort he felt as his widowed father began pursuing new relationships in his memoir. Reflecting on their respective experiences, Barker characterized all three members as coming from "broken homes."

The song itself was drawn most directly from DeLonge's experience. He later recalled being largely oblivious to his parents' marital problems as a teenager, which became apparent to him abruptly when he returned home one day to find scrape marks across the family's driveway where his father had dragged out his furniture. He later identified the episode as the basis for "Stay Together for the Kids":

I lived, ate, and breathed skateboarding. All I did all day long was skateboard. It was all I cared about. So I didn't notice too much [else going on]. When I got home [one] day, my dad's furniture was gone, my mom was inside crying and everything just erupted at that point. I was 18, sitting in my driveway when it all went down. My whole family life was deteriorating, so, I just moved out. So I just took everything from that day and put it into a song.

The band viewed the topic as universal, and reflective of a broader generational phenomenon. At the time of the song's release, divorce rates in the United States had risen considerably from previous decades, with more than half of marriages estimated to end in divorce. DeLonge believed the prevalence of divorce gave the song a wide audience among young listeners who shared its feelings of anger and alienation. "You look at statistics that 50 percent of parents get divorced, and you’re going to get a pretty large group of kids who are pissed off and who don’t agree with what their parents have done," he said.

== Recording and production ==
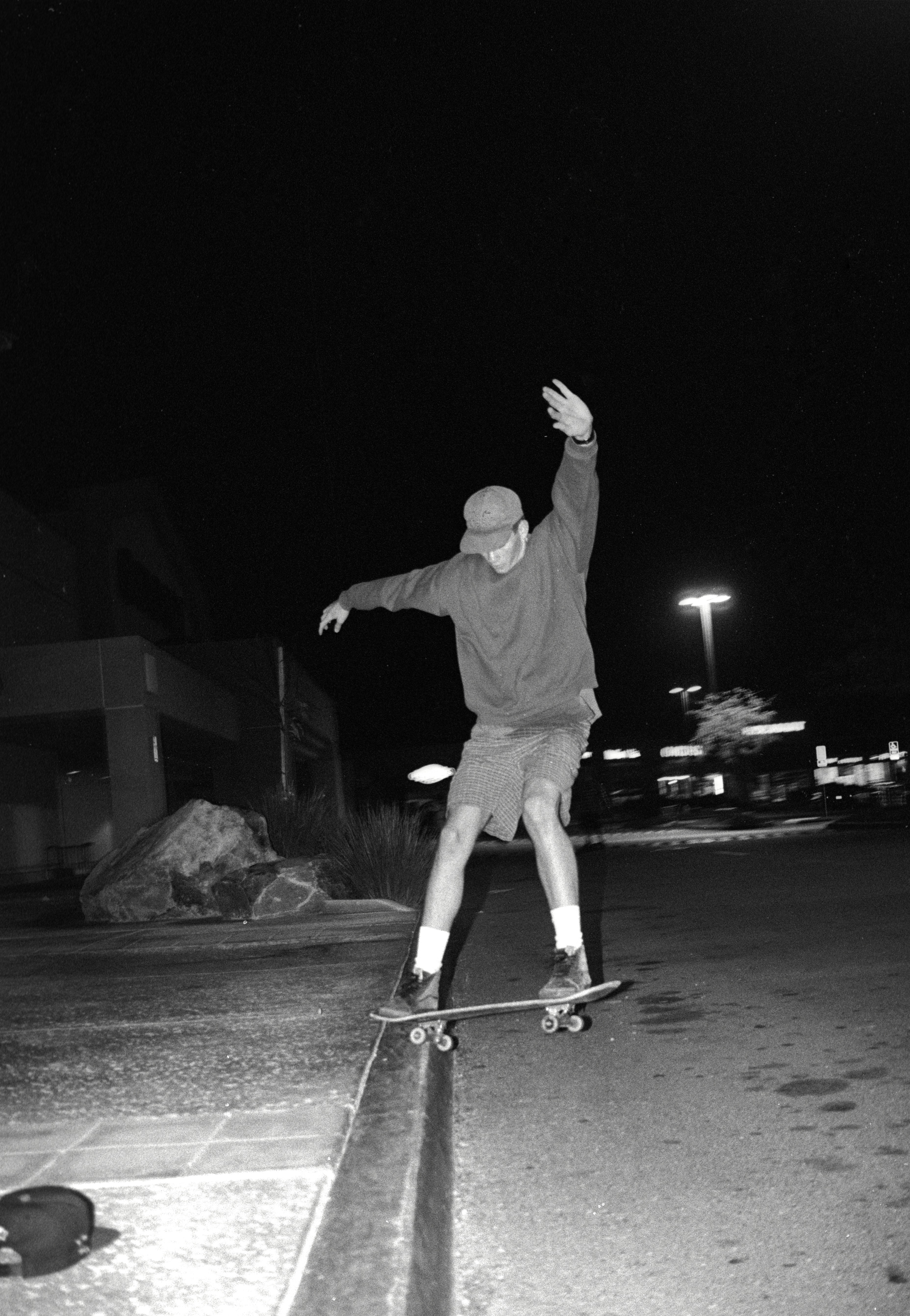
Tom DeLonge, the song's primary lyricist, seen here in the early 1990s.

"Stay Together for the Kids" came together near the end of the recording sessions for the band's fourth album, Take Off Your Pants and Jacket. According to drummer Travis Barker, the song was completed only a day before the band was scheduled to turn the album over for mixing. Its heavier sound reflected music the members had been listening to during the sessions, particularly post-hardcore bands such as Fugazi and Refused.

The song developed from an informal jam between Barker and DeLonge. DeLonge introduced a guitar riff, to which Barker responded with a complementary drum pattern, and the pair continued developing the idea until arriving at a straightforward verse–chorus arrangement. Before leaving the sessions to tour with another band, Barker provided the group with a drum concept for the song, including separate ideas for the verses and choruses. He envisioned the verses with tight, restrained drums influenced by hip-hop, contrasting them with a considerably wider drum sound in the choruses. With little time remaining in the sessions, the band recorded the song quickly. "It was simple, but it worked, and it was cool," Barker later recalled. The song was produced by Jerry Finn, with frequent collaborator Roger Joseph Manning Jr. contributing piano to the recording. DeLonge credited his work with Finn with teaching him how to write songs that were "in-your-face, but still produced really well," an approach that informed the band's increasingly dynamic and heavier material.

"Stay Together for the Kids" departed from the band’s typically irreverent subject matter. Hoppus viewed it as DeLonge's counterpart to "Adam's Song," Hoppus's meditation on suicide from the band's previous album, Enema of the State. He praised it as a "really beautiful song" containing some of DeLonge's strongest and most personal lyrics. At the time of the album's release, Hoppus also singled out the track as an example of the band attempting to move beyond its established sound. "There's always a song or two where we really try to really push ourselves," he said, adding that on Take Off Your Pants and Jacket, "it's 'Stay Together for the Kids.'"

== Composition ==
"Stay Together for the Kids" is a power ballad that has been considered a pop-punk, emo, and alternative rock song. Characterized by a quiet–loud dynamic, pairing subdued, melancholy verses with heavier, explosive choruses. Stereogum characterized its structure as drawing from the 1990s alternative rock formula of quiet verses and loud choruses. It is set in the time signature of common time, with a tempo of 72 beats per minute. It is composed in the key of D major with vocals spanning the tonal nodes of A_{3} to B_{5}. Bassist Mark Hoppus and guitarist Tom DeLonge share lead vocals, with Hoppus singing the verses and DeLonge taking the choruses. The song opens with a sparse, spindly guitar riff accompanied by the crackle of television static. Hoppus delivers the verses in a somber style, describing a family fractured by its parents' unresolved conflict: "Rather than fix the problems / They never solve them / It makes no sense at all."

The song's dynamics contrast its subdued verses with considerably heavier choruses, in which DeLonge shifts to shouted vocals over distorted guitars. DeLonge later described the arrangement as an early experiment in dynamics, recalling that he "wanted something that was a bit more melancholy and quiet" before erupting into explosive choruses. His performance turns the narrator's frustration outward, culminating in the refrain, "So when you're dead and gone / Will you remember this night? / Twenty years now lost." The bridge introduces piano alongside an interlocking guitar part before returning to an instrumental rendition of the chorus. A final double chorus expands the arrangement further, reintroducing the piano alongside a softer acoustic guitar accompaniment. The song gradually fades out as DeLonge repeats, "It's not right."

DeLonge later attributed the song's impact less to its construction than to the emotion it conveyed. In the documentary Pursuit of Tone, he described the song as capturing "adolescents lashing out over being caught in the middle of a storm that they had no control of," a quality he considered central to its appeal. "I think that's what's great about rock 'n' roll," he said. "It's not about the music as much as it's about the emotion, and the emotion is what resonates with people."

== Commercial performance ==
"Stay Together for the Kids" was released as a single and EP on February 4, 2002, with live tracks and video extras. It debuted on Billboard's Modern Rock Tracks chart in the issue dated September 22, 2001, at number 36, before gradually rising to a peak of position seven in the issue dated November 24, 2001. The single spent 26 weeks on the chart as a whole, before appearing in the issue dated March 16, 2002. It also peaked at number 16 and spent five weeks on the Bubbling Under Hot 100 Singles chart, which documents top singles that have yet to chart on the main chart, the Billboard Hot 100. By June 2002, the song had accumulated over 80,000 spins on radio in the United States, and it received a BDS Certified Spin Award. Outside of the US, the song charted in Germany, where it reached a peak of 73.

== Reception ==
"Stay Together for the Kids" received positive reviews from contemporary music critics. Rob Sheffield of Rolling Stone deemed the song "bleak," describing it as a "broken-family snapshot." Eric Aiese of Billboard wrote that the song "remains compelling throughout," suggesting it could be a "MacArthur Park" or "Hey Jude" within the band’s catalogue. Slant Magazine's Aaron Scott called it "the best track on the album," writing, "The surprising content about a marriage that is resisting divorce will certainly appeal to a generation of youth subjected to a massive divorce epidemic. Blink hints at something here, but resists saying anything concrete."

Tom Kielty of The Boston Globe described "Stay Together for the Kids" as "heart-rending", praising its emotional intensity and writing that the band "knocked off the silliness and concentrated" on the song's themes of broken families. Chris Macias of The Sacramento Bee described "Stay Together for the Kids" as "a sober take on divorce," praising its exploration of "unrequited crushes, alienation in high school hallways and other young-man blues" as evidence of the band's growing maturity. John J. Miller of the National Review included the song at number 17 in "Rockin' the Right: The 50 Greatest Conservative Rock Songs", describing it as "a eulogy for family values by an alt-rock band whose members were raised in a generation without enough of them".

William Shaw of Blender compared the song to then-popular songs by rock bands about divorce, such as Papa Roach ("Broken Home"), Staind ("For You") and Nickelback ("Too Bad"), commenting, "The ’90s had Generation X — have we ended up with Generation Whine?" He interviewed DeLonge, who remarked in response to divorce's effect on children, "Is this a damaged generation? Yeah, I’d say so."

== Music video ==
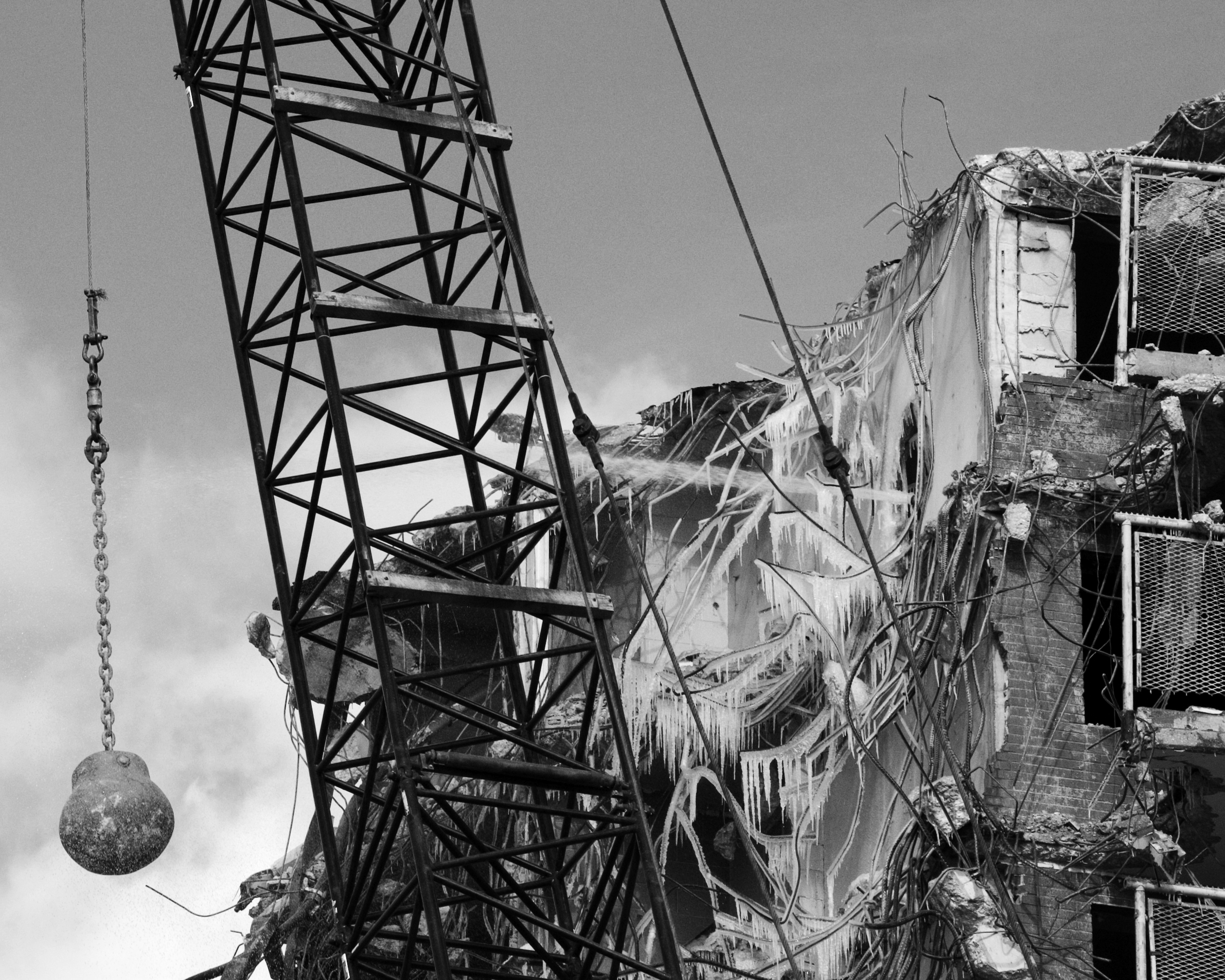
The music video depicts a suburban home being demolished, symbolizing family breakdown.

The music video for "Stay Together for the Kids" depicts the band performing inside a suburban house as it is gradually demolished, serving as a visual metaphor for a broken home and the effects of family conflict. It was directed by Samuel Bayer, a prominent director known for his work on iconic 1990s videos by bands like Metallica and Nirvana. The band sought to make the video a statement, and the label afforded the band a high budget to make the video stand out. For the location, the band selected a house in Fullerton, California that was slated for demolition and assembled a team of leading artists and set designers to oversee the shoot. The production employed high-end cinematography and special effects. For example, it utilized a technique developed for Saving Private Ryan that rattled the film cameras to intensify the visual impact of the wrecking ball striking the house.

Filming coincided with the September 11 attacks, which dramatically affected the production. The band and crew watched news coverage intermittently while filming, noting disturbing visual parallels between their video footage and the real-life destruction occurring in New York City. Concerned that the imagery could be misconstrued, Hoppus initially advised against releasing the video at all, but their label, MCA, insisted on receiving a return on their investment. It suggested re-editing the video to clarify its metaphorical intent, and added a statistic to open the clip: "50 percent of American households are destroyed by divorce." The band were displeased with these additions; Hoppus called the statistic "laughably ham-handed" in his book.

The video's release coincided with a period of heightened sensitivity following the attacks, during which some songs and albums were censored or altered to avoid controversy. MTV, which was based in New York, outright refused to air the original video. The video ended up being entirely reshot with the same production crew, with the crumbling home swapped to an empty mansion. It removes the wrecking ball, and replaces it with teenagers causing minor destruction, and swaps debris for leaves and trash to maintain the visual metaphor. The two videos were first released on The Urethra Chronicles II: Harder, Faster Faster, Harder, a 2002 home video on the band. The first video has since widely become available online on sites like YouTube.

== Legacy ==
"Stay Together for the Kids" resonated with children of divorce and became something of an anthem for family conflict. Bobby Olivier of Billboard viewed it "the ultimate anthem for millennial children of divorce." DeLonge later recalled receiving a steady stream of messages from fans who identified with the song's depiction of a broken home. "With 'Stay Together', we get emails—just kid after kid after kid—saying, 'I know exactly what you're talking about! That song is about my life!'" he said. In a 2002 Guardian feature, journalist William Shaw describes how the song connected deeply with teenagers whose parents had separated.

The song has continued to receive recognition in retrospective assessments of the band's work. Stereogum ranked it among the band's ten best songs, with writer Pranav Trewn analyzing the song's emphasis on emotional immediacy over nuance or resolution, suggesting that its lack of mature perspective authentically captures childhood trauma. Paste likewise included it among the band's best songs, describing it as the "heavy, emo centerpiece" of Take Off Your Pants and Jacket, with writer Matt Mitchell praising the band's ability to draw inward on personal turmoil. Beyond its original context, the song has continued to be used in settings that reflect war and instability; for example, a soldier is shown playing it on acoustic guitar during the War in Afghanistan near the end of the documentary Restrepo (2010).

Over time, the song acquired new personal meaning for its creators. Barker, who later went through two divorces, wrote that it "hits home today, in ways that I couldn't have guessed back then," adding that learning it was his children's favorite Blink-182 song "crushed me." During a 2025 performance, DeLonge similarly became emotional over the lyric "when you're dead and gone," explaining that it had come to remind him of his father's death years earlier.

== Track listing ==
All tracks are written by Blink-182.

Single track listing
No.	Title	Length
1.	"Stay Together for the Kids"	3:59
2.	"The Rock Show" (Live in Chicago)	3:06
3.	"Anthem Part Two" (Live in Chicago)	3:47
4.	"First Date" (Video)	3:17

EP track listing
No.	Title	Length
1.	"Stay Together for the Kids"	3:59
2.	"The Rock Show" (Live in Chicago)	3:06
3.	"Anthem Part Two" (Live in Chicago)	3:47
4.	"First Date" (Live in Chicago)	3:28
5.	"Carousel" (Live in Chicago)	2:55
6.	"First Date" (Video)	3:17
7.	"Stay Together for the Kids" (Video)	3:50

== Charts ==
Chart (2001–02)	Peak position
Germany (GfK)	73
Switzerland (Schweizer Hitparade)	85
UK Rock & Metal (Official Charts)	13
US Modern Rock Tracks (Billboard)	7
US Bubbling Under Hot 100 (Billboard)	16
