= Anthem Part Two =

Song by Blink-182

from the album Take Off Your Pants and Jacket
- Released: June 12, 2001
- Genre: Pop punk
- Length: 3:47
- Label: MCA
- Songwriters: Tom DeLonge; Mark Hoppus; Travis Barker
- Producer: Jerry Finn

"Anthem Part Two" is a song by American rock band Blink-182 from the band's fourth studio album, Take Off Your Pants and Jacket (2001). It was written primarily by guitarist Tom DeLonge, with additional songwriting credit to bassist Mark Hoppus, and drummer Travis Barker. It serves as a thematic sequel to their earlier song "Anthem", expanding on similar ideas of adolescent rebellion and generational conflict. In writing the song, DeLonge drew on his high school experiences and frustrations with authority. The surging, breakneck song pairs rapid-fire drums and stabbing guitar riffs with a tightly constructed pop-punk structure.

Critical reception to "Anthem Part Two" was mixed, with critics praising its high energy and hooks, while others criticized its youthful themes as simplistic and formulaic. The song has been covered by artists like Julien Baker. A sequel to the song, "Anthem Part 3", was released as the opening track of their ninth studio album One More Time... (2023).

== Background ==
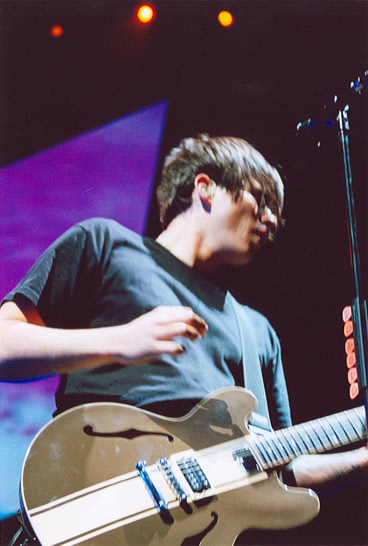
Guitarist Tom Delonge wrote the song based on his memories of growing up.

Blink-182 attracted mainstream recognition with its 1999 album Enema of the State, which sold five times platinum domestically and influenced a host of pop punk bands. Its follow-up, 2001's Take Off Your Pants and Jacket, followed a similar path, hitting number one on the Billboard 200. For the project, the trio aimed to make a groovier, less polished effort than its predecessor; central points of inspiration included post-hardcore acts like Fugazi and Refused. "Anthem Part Two" track takes its title from the final song on Enema, "Anthem"; it serves as a sequel and logical continuation of similar themes.

Though credited to all three band members, "Anthem Part Two" was largely composed by DeLonge. Hoppus has considered the song among DeLonge's best: "The intro still gives [me] chills," he wrote on Twitter in 2020, singling out its "stab of guitars and drums with the arpeggiated guitar line" as a highlight. To write the song, DeLonge explored his memories of high school:

"I do journey back every once in a while. I'll just put myself in that spot and say, 'What was I feeling at that moment?' For ["Anthem Part Two"], I was thinking about how when I was in high school, I got kicked out for drinking. And I didn't even drink a lot. I drank, like, once, and I got caught. My parents were ultra conservative and they just went berserk on me. And I remember going, 'Hey, if I'm really that messed up as a kid, then you guys should be blaming yourselves a little bit too and not taking it all out on me.'"

Lyrically, the song explores parental responsibility and adolescent frustration. Its chorus places blame for teenage misconduct squarely on parents, declaring, "If we're fucked up, you're to blame." The song's rebellious verses claim "We need guidance, we've been misled / Young and hostile but not stupid." During the song's bridge, DeLonge repeats with increasing intensity that "everything has fallen to pieces." Variety writer Troy J. Augusto interpreted the lyrics as a "cry out for leadership in a seemingly out-of-control world." According to sheet music published at Musicnotes.com by Kobalt Music Publishing America, "Anthem Part Two" is written in common time with a tempo of 207 beats per minute, and is set in the key of C major. DeLonge's vocal parts span from c♯_{5} to G_{5}.

Upon their reunion with Tom DeLonge in 2022, the band recorded a sequel to the song titled "Anthem Part 3" for their 2023 album One More Time...

== Reception ==
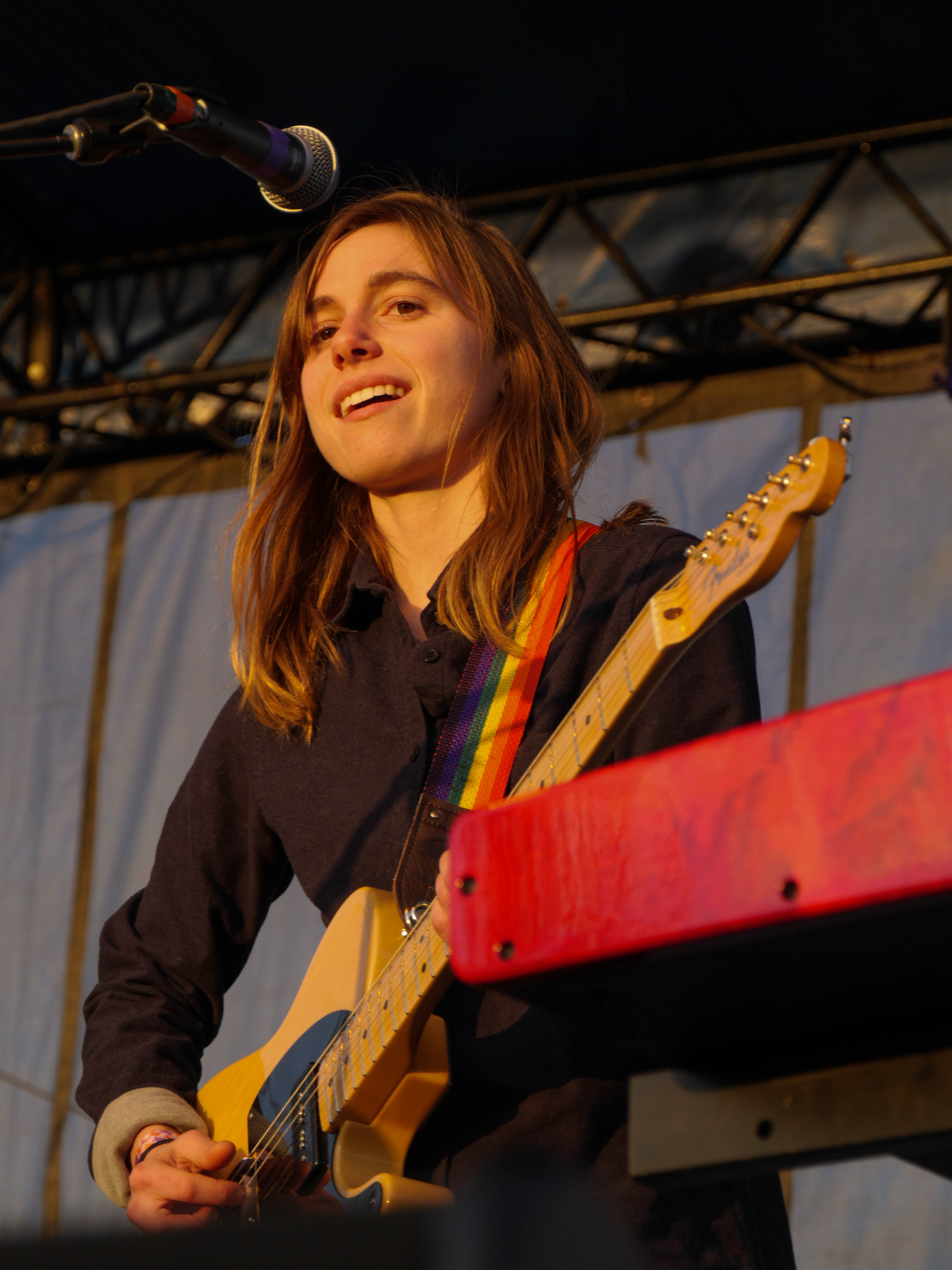
Singer-songwriter Julien Baker covered the song in 2020.

Critical reception towards "Anthem Part Two" was mixed. Greg Kot of the Chicago Tribune identified "Anthem Part Two" as an example of the group's subtle "undercurrent of seriousness and an attention to songcraft." Kyle Ryan, writing for The A.V. Club called it "one of Jacket's best songs, with a massively catchy four-chord chorus and just the right amount of self-righteous rebellion for teenagers to sing along." Kevin O'Hare of Newhouse News Service likened "Anthem Part Two" to the Who's "My Generation", calling it one of the strongest "us-against-them" teenage anthems in years.

Darren Ratner, writing for Allmusic, considered it "irresistible," opining that it houses a "indomitable school-kid voice where a surging vapor of knockout speed chords meet wrecking-ball percussion." Among the more negative reviews, Aaron Scott of Slant Magazine found the song "rocking and almost musically interesting", but its content "dubious coming from three guys who are nearly 30." Steven Wells at NME was derisive, bemoaning its "whiny vocals" and "brittle-boned punk-superlite guitar." Joshua Klein of The Washington Post considered it too formulaic, describing its "cookie-cutter" arrangement as too similar to the band's past singles.

In a 2020 piece for Nylon, Jack Barakat of All Time Low and Ryan Key of Yellowcard—both among the band's descendants—praised the song among their favorites of the genre. Key remarked: "The snare drum sounded like a shotgun. The sparkly clean guitar riff was such a different sound for a punk song. That whole record blew my mind at the time, but I’ve always put a lot of stock in album openers, and that song may be the best of any pop-punk record ever made."

=== Usage in media and other versions ===
Director Richard Linklater selected "Anthem Part Two" to soundtrack a singular growing-up montage in his 2014 film Boyhood. Singer-songwriter Julien Baker in 2020 covered the song for Save Stereogum: An '00s Covers Comp, a digital compilation benefitting the music website. Justin Curto of the blog Vulture described it as a "tearjerker performance."

== Personnel ==
Adapted from the liner notes for Take Off Your Pants and Jacket.

Locations

- Recorded at Signature Sound (San Diego, California) and Larrabee Studios West and Cello Studios (Hollywood, California)

Blink-182

- Mark Hoppus – bass guitar, vocals
- Tom DeLonge – guitars, vocals
- Travis Barker – drums, percussion

Additional musicians

- Roger Joseph Manning, Jr. – keyboards

Technical

- Jerry Finn – production
- Tom Lord-Alge – mixing
- Joe McGrath – engineering
- Joe Marlett – assistant engineer
- Ted Reiger – assistant engineer
- Robert Read – assistant engineer
- Femio Hernandez – mixing assistant
- Mike "Sack" Fasano – drum tech
- Brian Gardner – mastering
