= First Date (Blink-182 song) =

2001 single by Blink-182

Single by Blink-182

from the album Take Off Your Pants and Jacket
- B-side: "Don't Tell Me It's Over"
- Released: September 24, 2001
- Recorded: January–March 2001
- Studio: Signature Sound (San Diego); Larrabee West, Cello (Hollywood)
- Genre: Pop-punk; punk rock
- Length: 2:51
- Label: MCA
- Songwriters: Tom DeLonge; Mark Hoppus; Travis Barker
- Producer: Jerry Finn

Blink-182 singles chronology
"The Rock Show" (2001)	"First Date" (2001)	"I Won't Be Home for Christmas" (2001)

Music video
- "First Date" on YouTube

"First Date" is a song by the American rock band Blink-182 from their fourth studio album, Take Off Your Pants and Jacket (2001). It was released as the second single from the album on September 24, 2001. It was written primarily by guitarist Tom DeLonge, with additional songwriting credit to bassist Mark Hoppus, and drummer Travis Barker. "First Date" explores the awkwardness and emotional complexity that can arise when two people meet for the first time. Tom DeLonge wrote the song based on memories of an early relationship.

The song's creation stems from Blink-182 manager Rick DeVoe's opinion that the album lacked a catchy, "feel-good" song. DeLonge composed "First Date" in response, while bassist Mark Hoppus composed the album's lead single "The Rock Show". The song's music video depicts the trio as hippies in the 1970s, parading around the suburbs in a Volkswagen van and visiting a water park.

In the United States, the song spent nearly half a year on Billboard's Modern Rock Tracks chart, on which it peaked at number six; internationally, it was a top five hit on the UK Rock Chart, and reached the top 40 on the all-genre UK Singles Chart. Music critics were generally mixed in their reception, with many considering it unimaginative. In promotion of the single, Blink-182 performed the song live on late-night talk show Late Night with Conan O'Brien, and at the 2001 MTV Europe Music Awards.

== Background ==
"First Date" was written during late 2000 as Blink-182 worked on material for Take Off Your Pants and Jacket. During pre-production at DML Studios in Escondido, Blink-182 developed material that reflected a comparatively darker tone than their earlier work. However, both their label and manager, Rick DeVoe, pushed for a more accessible, radio-friendly single, expressing concern that the new songs lacked a clear commercial standout. Frustrated by the pressure, principal songwriters Mark Hoppus and Tom DeLonge set out to consciously lean into bright melodies, simple structure, and relatable lyrical themes. In a single evening, the pair wrote two deliberately commercial songs: Hoppus composed "The Rock Show", while DeLonge developed "First Date".

For "First Date", DeLonge drew directly from personal experience, revisiting memories from his early relationship with his first wife. He described the song as capturing the awkwardness and uncertainty of an initial romantic outing, including feeling unsure of "how to act, what to wear, or what to say." Recalling their first date at SeaWorld San Diego, where the two spent time casually walking and observing the exhibits, DeLonge channeled those feelings of youthful discomfort and nervous excitement into the song’s lyrics. After writing the song, the band further worked out its arrangement at drummer Travis Barker's Famous Stars and Straps warehouse in San Diego.

== Reception ==
Joshua Klein of The Washington Post found the track "immediately likable," if innocuous, while Kevin O'Hare of Newhouse News Service found the song "shockingly innocent". Gina Vivinetto of Tampa Bay Times called the song a "tender tune." Darren Ratner, reviewing for AllMusic, writes that the song serves as "therapy for post-pubescent dilemma," adding that he found it "sharp, if not entertaining." Aaron Scott of Slant Magazine expressed the belief that the "biggest chunk of the record-buying public is just the right age to relate to their songs about first dates," viewing its parent album on the whole monotonous. Nick Hornby, writing for The New Yorker, said the song proceeds "straightforwardly and unimaginatively." Chuck Taylor at Billboard was dismissive, commenting, "Fans will dig it — otherwise it's business as usual for a band who's made the most of its 15 minutes."

== Commercial performance ==
Commercially, "First Date" became another international hit for blink-182. It was first released as a single on September 24, 2001, in Australia, then was serviced to US alternative radio in early 2002. It debuted on Billboard's Modern Rock Tracks chart in the issue dated February 2, 2002, at position 25; it began collecting significant airplay two weeks later. It first entered the top ten in the week ending March 16, and reached its peak at number six during the week of April 6, where it remained for four weeks. It dropped out of the top ten in the week ending May 11, and fell off the ranking after 25 weeks, on July 27, 2002. It also reached number six on the Bubbling Under Hot 100, while also entering the Hot 100 Airplay chart.

Internationally, the song charted across Europe and Oceania, reaching number 25 in Scotland, number 31 on the UK Singles Chart, and the top 50 in Australia, Ireland, and Sweden. It also entered the national charts in Austria, France, Germany, and Switzerland.

== Music video ==
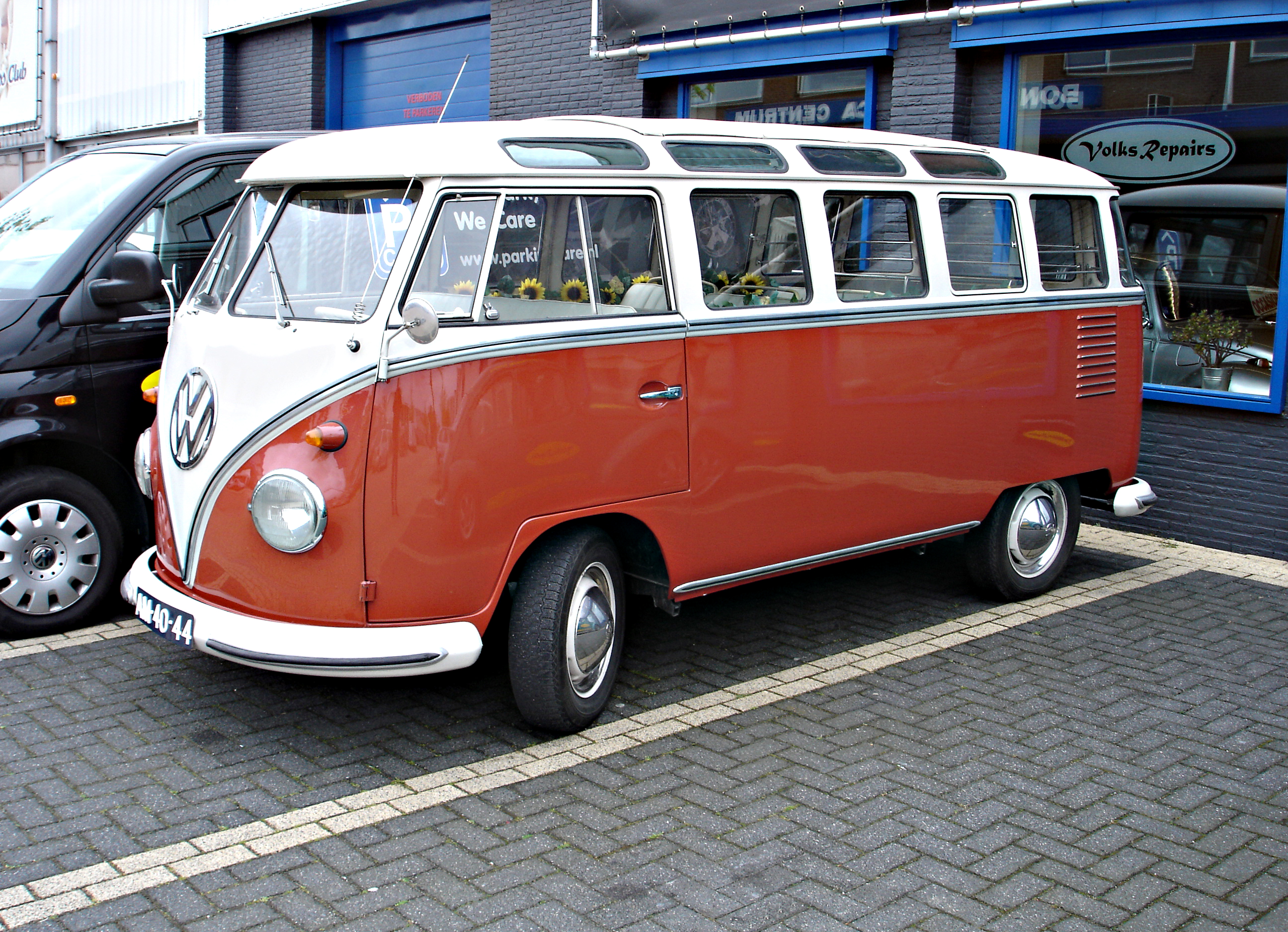
The video features the trio riding around in a red Volkswagen van.

The music video for "First Date" pays homage to 1970s culture, featuring the band acting as long-haired hippie versions of themselves. Clad in long wigs, bell-bottoms and butterfly collars, the trio drive around a quiet suburb in a Volkswagen van, making stops at a diner and water park. The video, directed by The Malloys, was filmed over three days in Burnaby, British Columbia, and performance footage was filmed in a garage decorated with 1970s paraphernalia. Although the video was actually filmed in British Columbia, the video was thematically set in El Segundo, California in 1974. Singer Jordan Pundik and guitarist Chad Gilbert of New Found Glory, with whom the band were touring at the time, make cameo appearances in the clip. Journalist Joe Shooman interpreted the video as a retelling of the film Dazed and Confused. Elements of the clip's concept stemmed from DeLonge, who viewed a documentary on the Bee Gees and found their hair and clothing outrageous: "I called up Mark and was like, 'Dude you've got to watch this shit.' These dudes are on top of a mountain, singing face to face, with the sunset behind them," he recounted. The video debuted on MTV's Total Request Live on January 18, 2002; it was added to the playlists of MuchMusic in Canada during the week of February 9, 2002, and the College Television Network on March 16. As its radio performance peaked, it attracted airplay on MTV; it was first listed on Billboard's Video Monitor, ranking the most-played clips on television stations, in the week of April 20, 2002.

A shot from the video, where DeLonge's character Boomer mouths the phrase "what the fuck", became a popular GIF online in the late 2010s. In addition, DeLonge's company, To the Stars, has produced merchandise based on the Boomer character. In 2021, DeLonge created and played a new character named Disco that is said to be Boomer's older brother. Disco was featured in the music video for the song "Losing My Mind" by DeLonge's other band, Angels & Airwaves.

== Track listing ==
All tracks are written by Blink-182.

First Date CD Single
No.	Title	Length
1.	"First Date"	2:51
2.	"Don't Tell Me It's Over"	2:34
3.	"Mother's Day"	1:37
4.	"The Rock Show" (Video)	2:55

All tracks are written by Blink-182.

First Date DVD Single
No.	Title	Length
1.	"First Date"
2.	"The Rock Show" (Video)
3.	"4x30 Second Clips (1. The Rock Show (Live); 2. Backstage; 3. Say Hello to Travis; 4. Want a Ticket?)"

First Date Single 7-inch
No.	Title	Length
1.	"First Date"	2:51
2.	"Don't Tell Me It's Over"	2:34

== Personnel ==
Blink-182

- Tom DeLonge – guitars, lead vocals
- Mark Hoppus – bass, backing vocals
- Travis Barker – drums

Production

- Jerry Finn – production
- Tom Lord-Alge – mixing
- Joe McGrath – engineering
- Joe Marlett – assistant engineering
- Ted Reiger – assistant engineering
- Robert Read – assistant engineering
- Femio Hernandez – mixing assistance
- Mike "Sack" Fasano – drum tech
- Brian Gardner – mastering

== Charts ==
Chart (2001–2002)	Peak position
Australia (ARIA)	50
Austria (Ö3 Austria Top 40)	69
Belgium (Ultratip Bubbling Under Flanders)	15
France (SNEP)	81
Germany (GfK)	74
Ireland (IRMA)	47
Scottish Singles Sales (Official Charts)	25
Sweden (Sverigetopplistan)	48
Switzerland (Schweizer Hitparade)	92
UK Singles (Official Charts)	31
UK Rock & Metal (Official Charts)	2
US Bubbling Under Hot 100 (Billboard)	6
US Radio Songs (Billboard)	84
US Alternative Airplay (Billboard)	6
US Rock Digital Songs (Billboard)	33

== Certifications ==
Region	Certification	Certified units/sales
Italy (FIMI)	Gold	50,000^{‡}
New Zealand (RMNZ)	Platinum	30,000^{‡}
United Kingdom (BPI) Sales since 2004	Platinum	600,000^{‡}
^{‡} Sales+streaming figures based on certification alone.
