= Rick DeVoe =

American music manager

- Born: Encinitas, California, U.S.
- Occupations: Music manager; concert promoter
- Spouse: Julie DeVoe
- Children: 3

Rick DeVoe is an American music manager and concert promoter best known for managing the rock band blink-182 during its rise to mainstream success in the 1990s and 2000s. Emerging from the region's surf and skate culture, DeVoe founded the promotion company Big Dummy, which combined surf film premieres with live punk performances and helped forge connections between the action sports and punk rock communities.

He later founded Rick DeVoe Management, representing musicians and professional surfers. During his career, DeVoe has managed or represented artists including blink-182, Angels & Airwaves, New Found Glory, Pennywise, Fenix TX, Eisley, The Aquadolls, among others.

== Early life ==
DeVoe grew up in the Los Angeles communities of Woodland Hills, Calabasas, and Malibu, where he became immersed in Southern California's surfing culture. As a high school student, he founded his school's surf club and organized surfing competitions and lunchtime concerts to raise funds for the organization. Among his earliest events was the "Big Dummy Jam," a surf film premiere held at the Whisky a Go Go in Hollywood, which combined surf films, live music, and sponsorship from surfwear companies.

Seeking to combine his interests in surfing and punk rock, DeVoe founded the promotion company Big Dummy, which organized surf film premieres accompanied by live performances from punk bands. As the surf films he promoted grew in popularity, DeVoe began working with prominent filmmakers, including Taylor Steele. During this period, he developed relationships with surf brands such as Quiksilver and Volcom, while collaborating with independent label Epitaph Records to feature artists including Pennywise, Bad Religion, and NOFX on surf film soundtracks.

== Career ==
After relocating to San Diego to attend San Diego State University, DeVoe began managing the local punk band Unwritten Law and became a promoter for The Offspring. In August 1994, he joined concert promoter Bill Silva, where he continued booking punk rock concerts under the Big Dummy Productions banner. During this period, he promoted performances by artists including the Offspring, Green Day, and Sublime.

In late 1994, DeVoe became the manager of the San Diego punk band blink, later known as blink-182. Guitarist Tom DeLonge approached DeVoe with a homemade press kit consisting primarily of fanzine clippings, reviews, and hand-drawn cartoons in an effort to convince him to represent the group. Although he had never seen the band perform live, DeVoe agreed to take them on as clients. He secured the band's first booking agency, the Tahoe Agency, and helped cultivate its association with the surf, skateboarding, and snowboarding communities by arranging sponsorships with companies including Billabong, Hurley, and Arnette. DeVoe also played a key role in the band's business strategy, including signing to MCA Records in 1996.

As blink-182's popularity grew during the late 1990s, DeVoe remained the group's manager through its commercial peak, overseeing its rise from clubs to international success. Beyond his managerial role, DeVoe maintained a close friendship with the members of blink-182 and occasionally appeared in the band's music videos, including "Dammit" (1997), and he also directed a behind-the-scenes documentary on the band, The Urethra Chronicles (1999). During this period, DeVoe established himself as one of the leading managers in punk rock, and founded Rick DeVoe Management, representing both musicians and professional surfers. His client roster expanded to include acts such as Pennywise, New Found Glory, Fenix TX, Eisley, as well as pro surfers Makua Rothman and Timmy Curran.

DeVoe also managed DeLonge's side project Box Car Racer, a relationship that contributed to tensions within blink-182. According to bassist Mark Hoppus and drummer Travis Barker, they increasingly viewed DeVoe as primarily representing DeLonge's interests, a dynamic that contributed to the band's internal divisions prior to its 2005 breakup. Following the split, DeVoe continued to manage DeLonge and his subsequent band, Angels & Airwaves.

When blink-182 reunited in 2009, DeVoe remained DeLonge's personal manager while working alongside the band's other management representatives. After DeLonge's departure from blink-182 in 2015, DeVoe continued to represent him until the two ended their professional relationship in 2019. DeVoe has since continued to manage emerging artists, including The Aquadolls, Sullvn, and Sitting on Stacy.

== Personal life ==
DeVoe is married to his wife, Julie, and they have three children. He resides in Encinitas, California.
