= The Rock Show =

2001 single by Blink-182

Single by Blink-182

from the album Take Off Your Pants and Jacket
- Released: May 7, 2001
- Recorded: January–March 2001
- Studio: Signature Sound (San Diego); Larrabee West, Cello (Hollywood, California)
- Genre: Pop-punk; emo
- Length: 2:51
- Label: MCA
- Songwriters: Mark Hoppus; Tom DeLonge; Travis Barker
- Producer: Jerry Finn

Blink-182 singles chronology
"Man Overboard" (2000)	"The Rock Show" (2001)	"First Date" (2001)

Music video
- "The Rock Show" on YouTube

"The Rock Show" is a song by the American rock band Blink-182 from their fourth studio album, Take Off Your Pants and Jacket (2001). It was released as the lead single from the album on May 7, 2001. The track shares writing credits between guitarist Tom DeLonge, bassist Mark Hoppus, and drummer Travis Barker, with Hoppus serving as its primary composer. Built around a fast, three-chord structure and a compact runtime of under three minutes, the song tells the story of falling in love after meeting a girl at a concert.

Drawing on the band's early experiences touring punk rock clubs, the song is influenced by acts such as the Ramones and the Descendents. Its lyrics explore young love, teenage rebellion and impulsivity. The band intentionally set out to create a simple, catchy track, writing it in response to pressure for an anthemic summertime single. It includes lyrical references to the Warped Tour, a traveling punk showcase that the band had previously headlined. The song was produced by Jerry Finn.

"The Rock Show" achieved strong alternative radio success in the United States—peaking at number two on Billboard's Modern Rock Tracks chart—while also charting widely across Europe. Critical reception to the song was generally positive, with reviewers highlighting its simplicity, energy, and nostalgic appeal. The music video for "The Rock Show" depicts Blink-182 using their label's budget on a series of chaotic, humorous stunts and public pranks, presented in a deliberately DIY, anarchic style that mocks the excesses of high-budget music videos most likely inspired by the stunts of the Jackass media franchise crew and the skits and stunts of underground skateboarding videos.

== Background and release ==
Blink-182 emerged from the Southern California punk scene in the nineties, first performing in small clubs across the region. Among their regular haunts were venues such as the Showcase Theatre in Corona and the all-ages venue SOMA in San Diego. SOMA—then located at 5305 Metro Street—was a gritty, do-it-yourself space housed in a converted industrial building that hosted both emerging punk acts and established bands such as Green Day and Rancid. In their early years, Blink-182 played dozens of shows there. Guitarist Tom DeLonge later recalled the venue's rough conditions: "It was covered with graffiti, it stunk, it was made of concrete and metal so the sound sucked and the toilets were always overflowing. It was the best—we loved it."

By the time Blink-182 began writing "The Rock Show", the group had transitioned far beyond small-capacity venues. Their 1999 album Enema of the State had propelled them to mainstream fame, leading to headlining tours in arenas and amphitheaters. The album produced multiple hit singles, and anticipation was high for a similarly successful follow-up. Seeking to move away from their increasingly comedic image, the band entered pre-production at DML Studios, a small practice studio in Escondido, where they developed material with a comparatively darker tone. Both their label and manager Rick DeVoe were eager for another broadly accessible single—particularly an upbeat, summer-ready anthem that could match the chart performance of the band's previous hits. After hearing their new material, DeVoe was receptive, but apprehensive that it did not contain a radio-friendly single. The band acknowledged the critique, though principal songwriters Mark Hoppus and DeLonge found it frustrating. Hoppus was particularly incensed: "You want a fucking single? I'll write you the cheesiest, catchiest, throwaway fucking summertime single you've ever heard!"

In response, Hoppus and DeLonge wrote two additional tracks in a single evening: "First Date" and "The Rock Show." Hoppus composed the song on acoustic guitar at home, drawing inspiration from a simple narrative of falling in love at a concert. He estimated it took him only ten minutes to write the song. The band later solidified the song's arrangement at the warehouse for drummer Travis Barker's clothing line, Famous Stars and Straps. The song resonated personally with all three members; Barker recalled growing up going to gigs by bands like Face to Face, the Dickies, and Rhythm Collision, where punk shows also served as spaces for socializing and meeting girls. Altogether, Hoppus later viewed the song as an exercise in immediacy rather than overanalysis. “There was no way to overthink them. It was almost like anti-thought. [We were] just making something people would like,” Hoppus noted. The track was subsequently recorded for the album with producer Jerry Finn, whose production, according to Hoppus, helped shape the material into the polished, radio-friendly form the band believed was expected of them. Keyboardist Roger Joseph Manning, Jr. was brought in to add an organ part to the song's outro.

"The Rock Show" was initially serviced to three US radio formats—alternative radio, mainstream rock, and active rock radio—between May 7 and 8, 2001. It was later sent to contemporary hit radio beginning on June 26 of that year. CD and maxi singles were released worldwide, supported mainly with the B-side "Time to Break Up". To promote the song, the band performed it on MTV's Total Request Live, as well as the Late Show with David Letterman.

== Composition ==
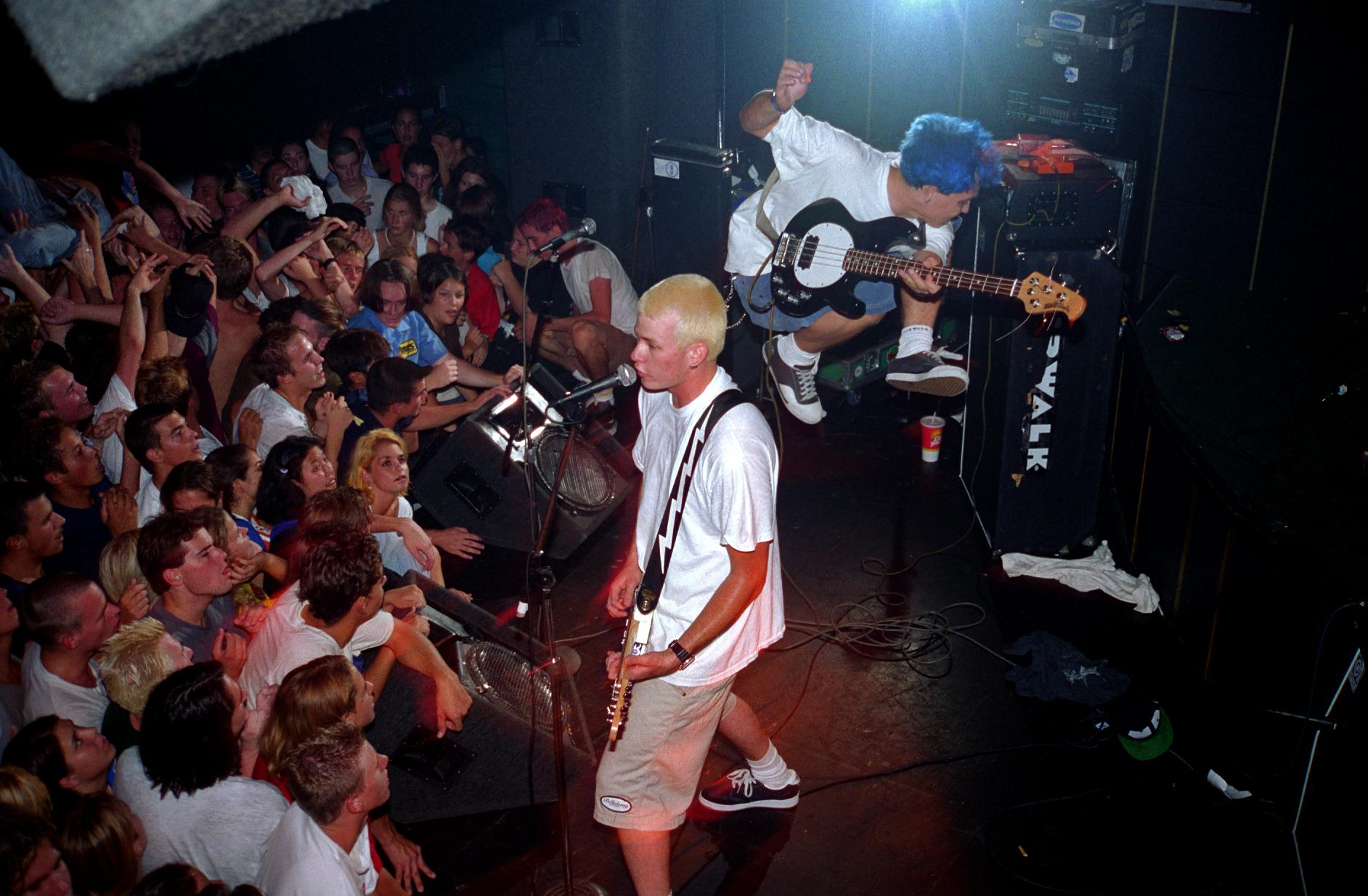
The band performing at a small punk club in 1995, the kind of setting that inspired "The Rock Show".

"The Rock Show" shares songwriting credits between the band's three members, but was primarily written by Hoppus. The song is two minutes and fifty-one seconds long. The song is composed in the key of A major and is set in time signature of common time with a driving tempo of 182 beats per minute. The band aimed to keep things simple with the song, which is based around three chords. DeLonge and Hoppus share vocals on the song. The song depicts Hoppus meeting the girl of his dreams at the Warped Tour, the traveling festival that became synonymous with the pop-punk and emo scenes of the era. The lyrics trace themes of teenage rebellion and impulsivity—depicting sneaking out, clashing with authority, and imagining escape. It aims to capture the spirit of bands the group idolized, including the Ramones, Screeching Weasel, and the Descendents. It has been variously referred to as a pop-punk or punk song.

The band members expanded upon the song's genesis in a 2001 interview with BBC Music:

I think it's actually as if we built a punk rock time capsule and went back to five years ago when we were writing songs. We wrote that song as a mid-tempo punk-pop song about a girl, and it ended up being one of the better ones on the record.

== Critical reception ==
Critical reception to "The Rock Show" was generally positive, with reviewers highlighting its simplicity, energy, and nostalgic appeal. Rob Sheffield of Rolling Stone described the song as a "slice of suburban teen romance," drawing a comparison to the Ramones’ simple, fast-food take on love in "Oh Oh I Love Her So". Similarly, Roger Catlin of the Hartford Courant praised it as one of the standout tracks on the album, emphasizing its "pure adrenaline and good cheer." Tom Kielty of The Boston Globe described "The Rock Show" as embodying the blink-182 aesthetic, pairing loud, hook-driven guitars and references to the Warped Tour with earnest lyrics about teenage romance.

Other critics focused on its accessibility and mainstream appeal. Joshua Klein from The Washington Post called it "immediately likable" and ideal as "soundtrack fodder" for a teen film, while David Browne of Entertainment Weekly characterized it as carefree and "cutesy." Eric Aiese of Billboard examined the song through the lens of its airplay competition: "As the face of rock radio has yielded toward the emerging hard sounds on "nu metal", Blink continues to provide a contrasting voice [...] "The Rock Show" clearly shows the band's talent for writing—and performing—hooks."

In retrospective analysis, Grant Sharples of Stereogum suggested the song distills Blink-182's core identity into a single nostalgic idea, encapsulated in the lyric "I couldn’t wait for the summer and the Warped Tour." The song made a reader's poll of the 10 best songs by the band conducted for Rolling Stone. Tom Connick in NME called the song a "classic track".

== Commercial performance ==
In the United States, "The Rock Show" debuted on Billboard's Modern Rock Tracks chart at number 28 in the issue dated May 19, 2001; it reached its peak position of number two on July 14, spending 26 weeks on the chart. It also peaked at number 71 on the Billboard Hot 100 and number 33 on the Mainstream Top 40 chart. It was ranked number 14 on the Modern Rock Tracks year-end chart of 2001.

Internationally, the single reached the top 10 in Portugal and Scotland and peaked at number 14 on the UK Singles Chart. Elsewhere, it achieved top-40 positions in countries including Australia, Austria, Ireland, Italy, and Sweden while also charting France, Germany, the Netherlands, and Switzerland. The song reached number 35 on the Eurochart Hot 100, which collected chart data from sales rankings across the continent. In the United Kingdom, it was certified gold by the British Phonographic Industry (BPI), denoting sales of over 400,000 units.

== Music video ==
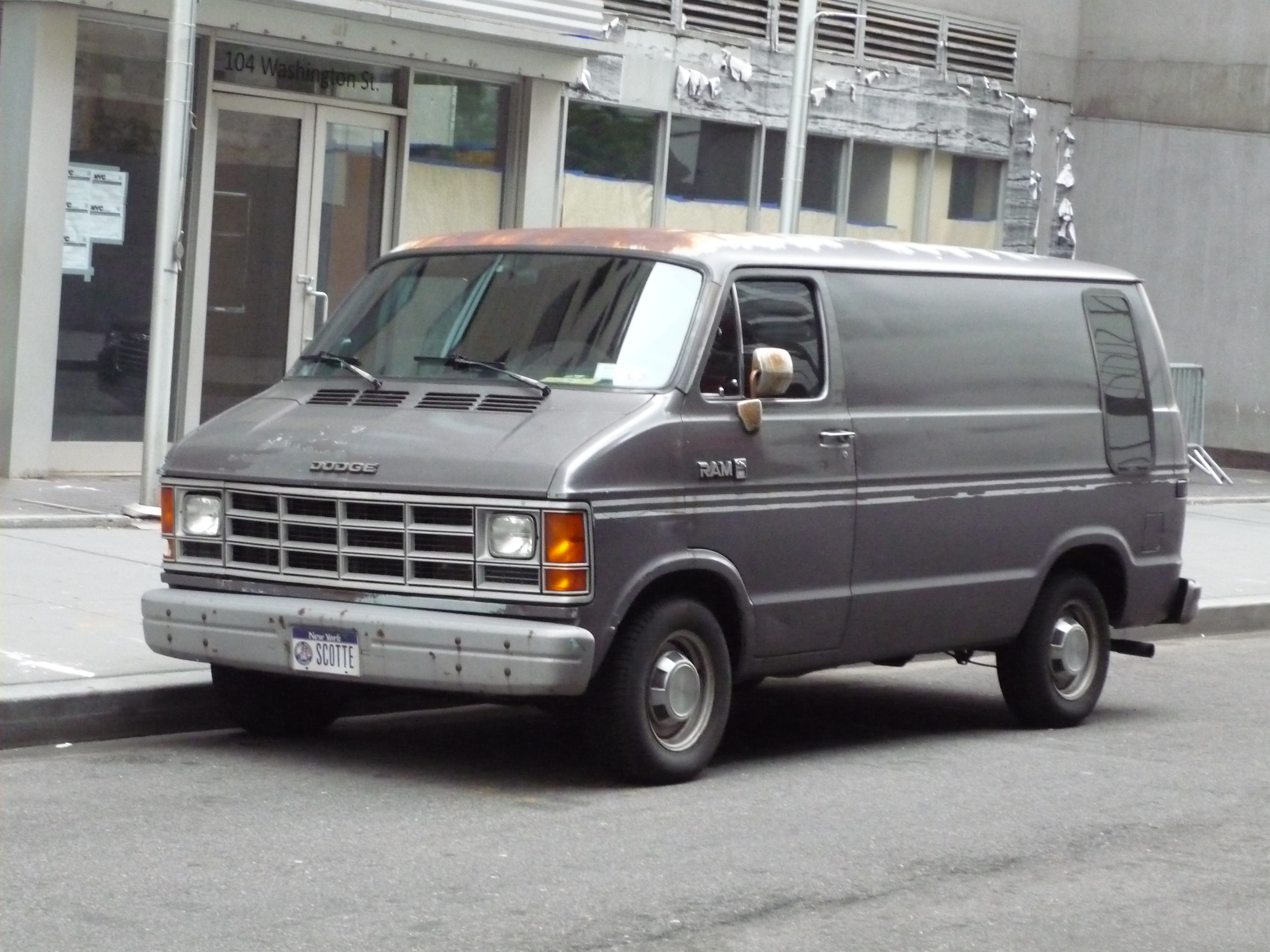
A gray Dodge Ram Van, a similar model of which was used in the video for the song.

The music video for "The Rock Show" continued blink-182's tradition of elaborate comedic videos, and depicts the band deliberately blowing the extravagant budget provided by their record label on chaotic stunts and pranks. It depicts the trio purchasing pet birds and a television set, setting the birds free and trashing the TV set and dropping a sports automobile from a crane, taking homeless individuals for a spa makeover, handing out and dropping cash from a rooftop to strangers, and paying people to have their head shaved and exotic dancers to mow the lawn of a random houseowner as well as having a plane banner display the song's album title. DeLonge said the group had originally envisioned more outrageous stunts, including driving cars off cliffs and setting pianos on fire, but many ideas were abandoned because they could not be broadcast on television. Many of the people involved were bewildered when handed money during filming, with some even suspecting it was a scam. The budget for the clip was reportedly $500,000.

The video was directed by the Malloy brothers, who had previously gained experience making surf films. DeVoe knew the filmmakers through his connections in the surfing industry. Marcos Siega, who had directed three of the band's previous videos, wrote a treatment for "The Rock Show" but was unable to get his schedule aligned to direct the clip. The band's label, MCA, initially wanted the video to focus on skateboarding, aiming to align the band with their SoCal subculture, but the band rejected the idea, but acknowledged the SoCal background with brief clips of skateboarding with one involving stunts of launching over the van. "We had to really put our foot down [with the label]," Hoppus recalled, noting that their growing clout allowed them to get the video they wanted. Hoppus later recalled that the band conceived the video as a deliberately chaotic, DIY-style clip, using handheld cameras in the style of an "anarchic skate video". The project became a way to lampoon the often exorbitant music-video budgets that reached millions at the millennial peak of the record industry. Still: "That was a cheap video for a band of our size at that time," Hoppus said. Despite initial label skepticism, Hoppus observed that the resulting footage fit well with MTV's post-Jackass programming, which embraced its anarchic tone. "We thought we’d made the Casablanca of punk videos," he remembered. The gray 1985 Dodge van that the band used for the video was later bought and restored by fans, where it has since been used as a traveling fan exhibit at Blink concerts.

The video for "The Rock Show" attracted heavy airplay on MTV's TRL, where it was retired from their countdown after 65 days, in August 2001. Other music videos have used a similar conceit, which critics have sometimes pointed out as reminiscent of "The Rock Show". Pop-punk band Knuckle Puck took direct inspiration for their 2017 clip for "Gone", while Drake's 2018 video for "God's Plan" was deemed unintentionally similar.

== Live performances and covers ==
The band first debuted "The Rock Show" live. Since then, it has become a staple of the band's setlists, sometimes as an opener. The band continued playing the song with Matt Skiba, DeLonge's replacement from 2015 to 2022. The band also played the song live on The Tonight Show with Jay Leno in 2009, in what was their first televised performance after reuniting.

The song has been covered by numerous artists. Mayday Parade played their spin on the song on the final Warped Tour in 2018, while the Paradox teamed with Travis Barker for a 2025 live cover. The same year, pop-punk band Bowling for Soup covered this song to coincide with the announcement that they were playing the relaunched Warped Tour. During their hiatus with Blink-182, Mark Hoppus and Travis Barker regularly played this song in their band, +44. Guitarist and background vocalist Craig Fairbaugh replaced DeLonge on backing vocals.

== Track listings ==
All tracks are written by Blink-182.

CD single 1
No.	Title	Length
1.	"The Rock Show" (radio edit)	2:51
2.	"Time to Break Up"	3:05
3.	"Man Overboard" (radio edit)	2:46
4.	"Man Overboard" (video)	3:12

CD single 2
No.	Title	Length
1.	"The Rock Show" (album version)	2:51
2.	"Aliens Exist" (live from The Mark, Tom, and Travis Show)	3:43
3.	"Adam's Song" (enhanced video)	4:22

DVD single
No.	Title	Length
1.	"The Rock Show" (album version)	2:51
2.	"All the Small Things" (video)	2:53
3.	"Clips from 'The Urethra Chronicles'" (video, four 30-seconds clips)

== Charts ==
=== Weekly charts ===
Chart (2001)	Peak position
Australia (ARIA)	34
Austria (Ö3 Austria Top 40)	38
Belgium (Ultratip Bubbling Under Flanders)	11
Europe (Eurochart Hot 100)	35
France (SNEP)	88
Germany (GfK)	55
Ireland (IRMA)	28
Italy (FIMI)	24
Netherlands (Single Top 100)	98
Portugal (AFP)	10
Scottish Singles Sales (Official Charts)	10
Sweden (Sverigetopplistan)	39
Switzerland (Schweizer Hitparade)	84
UK Singles (Official Charts)	14
US Billboard Hot 100	71
US Alternative Airplay (Billboard)	2
US Pop Airplay (Billboard)	33

=== Year-end charts ===
Chart (2001)	Position
US Modern Rock Tracks (Billboard)	14

== Certifications ==
Region	Certification	Certified units/sales
New Zealand (RMNZ)	Gold	15,000^{‡}
United Kingdom (BPI)	Gold	400,000^{‡}
^{‡} Sales+streaming figures based on certification alone.

== Release history ==
Region	Date	Format(s)	Label(s)	Ref.
United States	May 7, 2001	Alternative radio	MCA	
United States	May 8, 2001	Mainstream rock; active rock radio	MCA	
Australia	June 25, 2001	CD	MCA	
United States	June 26, 2001	Contemporary hit radio	MCA	
Japan	June 27, 2001	CD	MCA	
United Kingdom	July 2, 2001	CD; DVD	MCA	
