= Greatest Hits (Blink-182 album) =

2005 compilation album by Blink-182

Greatest hits album by Blink-182
- Released: October 31, 2005
- Recorded: 1994–2005
- Genres: Pop-punk; punk rock; skate punk; alternative rock
- Length: 54:38
- Label: Geffen
- Producers: O; Mark Trombino; Jerry Finn; Blink-182

Blink-182 chronology
Blink-182 (2003)	Greatest Hits (2005)	Neighborhoods (2011)

Blink-182 video chronology
The Urethra Chronicles II: Harder, Faster Faster, Harder (2002)	Greatest Hits (2005)

Singles from Greatest Hits
- 1. "Not Now" Released: November 28, 2005

Greatest Hits is the first greatest hits album of American rock band Blink-182. It was released on October 31, 2005, by Geffen Records. Greatest Hits was created by Geffen shortly after the band's February 2005 breakup, termed an "indefinite hiatus" by the label. Tensions had risen in the group and guitarist Tom DeLonge desired to take time off. Bassist Mark Hoppus and Travis Barker argued with DeLonge regarding the band's future and their possible next album, and heated exchanges led to DeLonge's exit. In the interim, Hoppus and Barker continued playing together in +44, and DeLonge formed his new outfit Angels & Airwaves.

The compilation collects the band's most successful singles with one new song and a non-album track. The collection covers tracks from the band's debut album Cheshire Cat (1995) to their self-titled album (2003). Greatest Hits features numerous hit singles by the band, including "Dammit", "What's My Age Again?", "All the Small Things", "The Rock Show", "First Date", "Feeling This" and "I Miss You".

"Not Now", which was recorded during the Blink-182 sessions (and originally released as a bonus track on the UK edition of Blink-182), featured on the compilation and was released as its lead single; a cover of "Another Girl, Another Planet" by the Only Ones was sent to radio as an airplay promotional single.

Greatest Hits peaked at number six on the Billboard 200 album chart. Critics were generally very positive regarding Greatest Hits, viewing it a suitable, reflective compilation of the band's hits. Andy Greenwald of Blender called it a "flawless compilation," covering the group's transition from "nudists to near-geniuses." The compilation was released alongside a DVD of the same name, a collection of the trio's music videos to that point in time. Greatest Hits has been certified platinum in Canada and triple platinum in Australia.

== Background ==
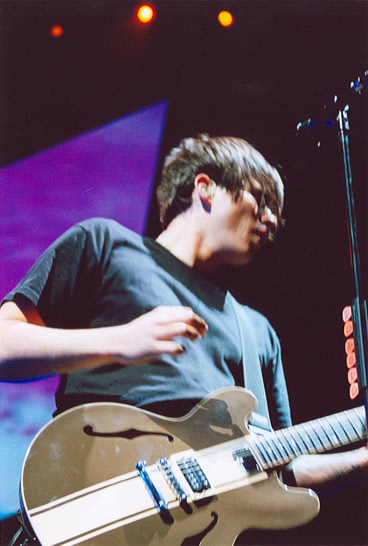
Tom DeLonge performing in 2004 with Blink-182. He left the group the following year.

By 2004, Blink-182, consisting of guitarist Tom DeLonge, bassist Mark Hoppus and drummer Travis Barker, had emerged as the biggest pop-punk act of the era, releasing the seven-times-multiplatinum Enema of the State (1999) and number one album Take Off Your Pants and Jacket (2001). The band had taken a brief break in 2001 when DeLonge suffered a herniated disc in his back, during which time he recorded an album—titled Box Car Racer—which contained darker musical material he felt was unsuited for Blink. Barker provided drums on the album, and the project quickly evolved into a full-fledged band. It caused great division between DeLonge and Hoppus, who was not included and felt betrayed. The moody subject matter and music on Box Car Racer edged its way into Blink's sound as well on their next effort, an eponymous fifth studio album (2003). Geffen Records, after the success of Box Car Racer, offered DeLonge a solo recording deal, which he declined, feeling that it would cast a negative shadow over the band. Nevertheless, the possible deal loomed over the band, contributing to internal tension.

DeLonge became increasingly conflicted both about his creative freedom within the group and the toll touring was taking on his family life. He soon expressed his desire to take a half-year respite from touring in order to spend more time with family. Hoppus and Barker were dismayed, viewing this break as overly long. Following the 2004 Indian Ocean earthquake, DeLonge agreed to perform at Music for Relief's Concert for South Asia, a benefit show to aid victims. Further arguments ensued during band rehearsals: DeLonge asserted he would only record another album at his home in San Diego, suggesting he email Pro Tools files to Hoppus and Barker in Los Angeles. The duo were flexible regarding DeLonge's time off, but became angry when he began deciding "when we can and can't tour, [and] when and how we can record." DeLonge quit the band, coming to the conclusion that the trio had simply grown apart as they aged, had families, and gained fame. Rumors had already begun to swirl when the band unexpectedly pulled out of the benefit show, and intensified when Dave Navarro of Jane's Addiction posted on his blog that the band had "apparently" broken up. The band's label, Geffen, confirmed this on February 22, 2005, terming their dissolution an "indefinite hiatus".

== Songs ==
"Not Now"
"Not Now", the lead single central to this compilation.

Greatest Hits consists of tracks spanning from the band's debut album, Cheshire Cat (1995) to their self-titled album. It opens with "Carousel", which was the very first song Hoppus and DeLonge wrote together upon their meeting in August 1992. It has been described by journalist Joe Shooman as "a satisfyingly fast-assed punk song in the vein of NOFX with some very adept dynamic breakdowns." The band's first promotional single, "M+M's", follows, which is based around power chords and Hoppus' lead vocal of a vacation elsewhere. "Dammit", which was the band's first major-label single and also their first radio hit, is themed around maturity and the refrain, "Well I guess this is growing up." The distinctive riff of "Dammit" was created when Hoppus was forced to skip over the missing two strings on an acoustic guitar. It reached number 11 on Billboard's Hot Modern Rock Tracks chart in 1998, and received heavy radio airplay. "Josie" is about "being stoked on a girl." It contains references to the bands Unwritten Law and Dance Hall Crashers ("My girlfriend likes UL and DHC"), two groups the band toured with in the mid-1990s.

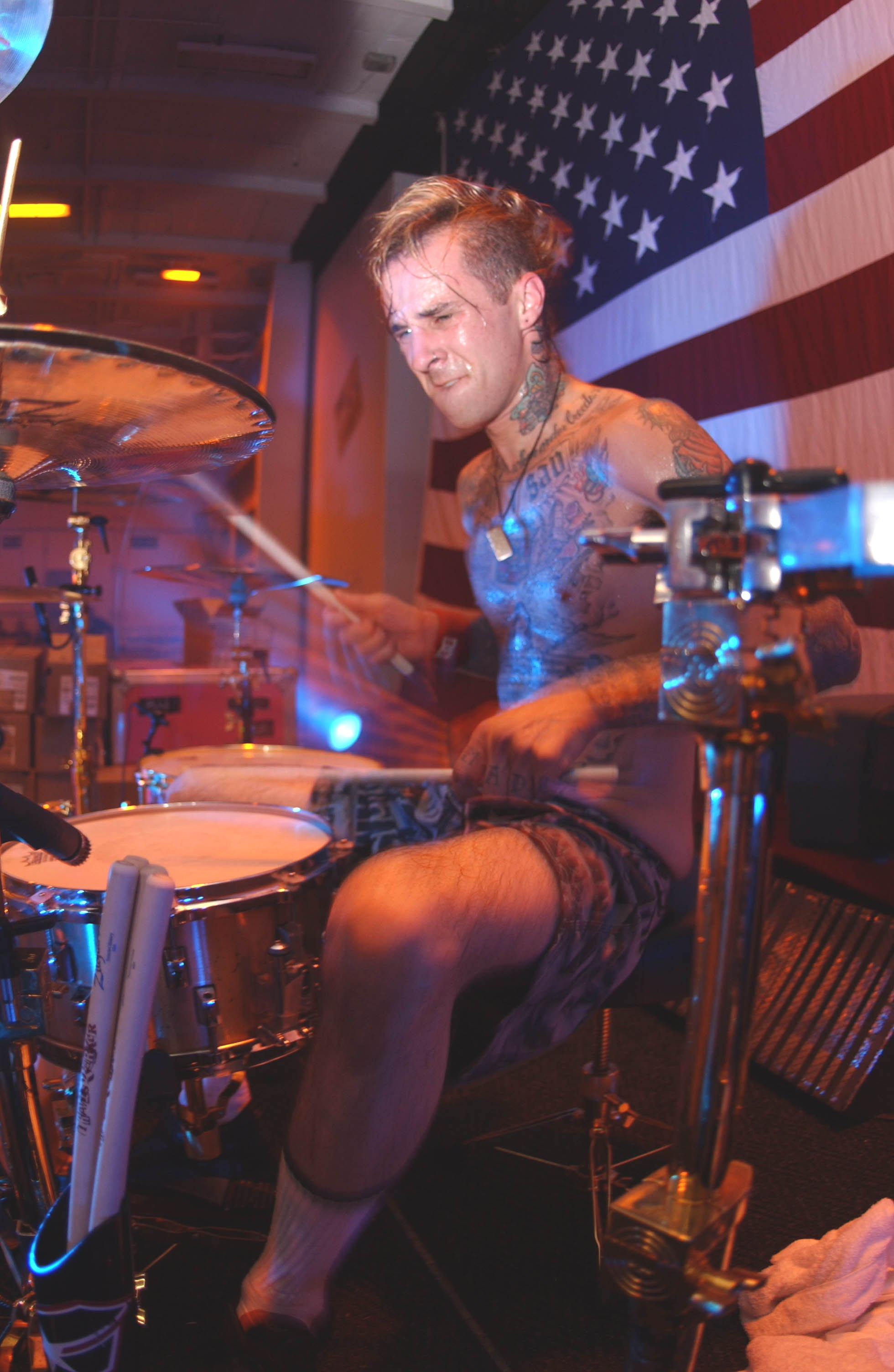
Drummer Travis Barker, who joined the group in 1998, performs on the majority of songs on Greatest Hits.

"What's My Age Again?" was originally titled "Peter Pan Complex", referencing the subject matter: one who refuses to grow up. Its music video features the band running in the nude through the streets of Los Angeles and became an MTV staple. The power pop-inspired "All the Small Things" was composed by DeLonge as both an ode to his girlfriend and one of his favorite bands, the Ramones. The single, released in early 2000, was the band's biggest mainstream hit, peaking at number six on the Billboard Hot 100 and number one on the Modern Rock Tracks chart. "Adam's Song," the piano-laced seventh track of the compilation, was written primarily based on the loneliness that Hoppus experienced during unending days of touring in 1997–98. "Man Overboard" is based on former drummer Scott Raynor and his firing from the band for alcohol abuse.

"The Rock Show" details two teenagers meeting a rock concert, and, despite failing grades and disapproving parents, the two remain in love. Hoppus wrote the song based on memories of the San Diego club Soma. "First Date" was inspired by DeLonge and wife Jennifer Jenkins' first date at SeaWorld San Diego. The track was written as a summary of neurotic teen angst and awkwardness. "Stay Together for the Kids" is written from the point of view of a helpless child of divorce. DeLonge wrote the song based on his parents' own divorce. "Feeling This" follows, and "illustrates a scenario of lust, ambivalence and regret," according to journalist Jon Wiederhorn. Its lyrics were intended to represent the lustful side of sex during the verses, the passionate side in the bridge and the romantic side in the chorus.

"I Miss You" was recorded entirely acoustic, and covers vulnerability in relationships. "Down" continues the theme of longing, set to a rain-drenched soundscape. "Always" was inspired by 1980s music in its tone; its lyrics, according to DeLonge, are about "wanting to hold a chick all night long." "Not Now", a B-side from the band's 2003 album and first included on this compilation, features a church organ in its verses and guitar riffs reminiscent of the Descendents; its subject matter continues the theme of complicated miscommunication and fading love. The album closes with "Another Girl, Another Planet", which is a cover of the song by the Only Ones and was used as the title theme for Barker's MTV reality series, Meet the Barkers.

== Release ==
Professional ratings
Review scores
Source	Rating
Allmusic	4/5 stars
Blender	5/5 stars
Rolling Stone	3.5/5 stars

Greatest Hits was first announced on August 29, 2005; it was initially slated to have a live version of "Man Overboard". The album's artwork is a smilie surrounded by arrows, which was first introduced on the band's 2003 album; it was illustrated by Mister Cartoon, a friend of drummer Travis Barker. In addition, the photography for Greatest Hits was supplied by another friend of Barker, Estevan Oriol. SA Studios handled the art direction for the compilation.

"Not Now" was selected to be the lead single, but was contested by the management between the former band members at the time. DeLonge's manager and original Blink manager Rick DeVoe supported "Not Now", while Hoppus and Barker's new management, Irving Azoff, lobbied for "Another Girl, Another Planet".

=== Commercial performance ===
In the United States, Greatest Hits peaked at number six on both the Billboard 200 and the magazine's Top Internet Albums chart, selling 72,000 copies in its first week. Greatest Hits charted highest in Canada, where it peaked at number three on the Canadian Albums Chart. The collection's second best performance arrived on Australia's ARIA Charts, where it peaked at number four. In the United Kingdom, the album also peaked at number six. The album also peaked at number nine in Austria, and number 12 on the French Albums Chart. The album charted lower in areas such as Japan, Germany, and New Zealand, but still within the top 40 of each respective country.

=== Critical reception ===
Andy Greenwald of Blender called it a "flawless compilation," covering the group's transition from "nudists to near-geniuses." Stephen Thomas Erlewine of Allmusic found the collection ran a little long, but overall deemed it an "intermittently entertaining collection."

== Track listing ==
Standard edition
No.	Title	Writer(s)	Original release	Length
1.	"Carousel" (Cheshire Cat version)	Mark Hoppus; Tom DeLonge	Originally from Buddha (1994), re-recorded for Cheshire Cat (1995)	3:11
2.	"M+M's"	Hoppus; DeLonge	Cheshire Cat	2:35
3.	"Dammit" (single version)	Hoppus; DeLonge; Scott Raynor	Dude Ranch (1997)	2:45
4.	"Josie" (single version)	Hoppus; DeLonge; Raynor	Dude Ranch	3:05
5.	"What's My Age Again?" (single version)	Hoppus; DeLonge	Enema of the State (1999)	2:28
6.	"All the Small Things" (single version)	Hoppus; DeLonge	Enema of the State	2:51
7.	"Adam's Song" (single version)	Hoppus; DeLonge	Enema of the State	4:06
8.	"Man Overboard" (Tom Lord-Alge remix)	Hoppus; DeLonge	The Mark, Tom, and Travis Show (The Enema Strikes Back!) (2000)	2:47
9.	"The Rock Show"	Hoppus; DeLonge; Travis Barker	Take Off Your Pants and Jacket (2001)	2:48
10.	"First Date"	Hoppus; DeLonge; Barker	Take Off Your Pants and Jacket	2:50
11.	"Stay Together for the Kids"	Hoppus; DeLonge; Barker	Take Off Your Pants and Jacket	3:52
12.	"Feeling This"	Hoppus; DeLonge; Barker	Untitled (2003)	2:53
13.	"I Miss You"	Hoppus; DeLonge; Barker	Untitled	3:47
14.	"Down" (single version)	Hoppus; DeLonge; Barker	Untitled	3:12
15.	"Always" (single version)	Hoppus; DeLonge; Barker	Untitled	4:17
16.	"Not Now" (alternate edit)	Hoppus; DeLonge; Barker	Untitled (Japan and UK exclusive)	4:23
17.	"Another Girl, Another Planet" (The Only Ones cover)	Peter Perrett	Previously unreleased	2:41
Total length:				54:38

International bonus track
No.	Title	Writer(s)	Original release	Length
18.	"Aliens Exist" (live in Los Angeles)	Hoppus; DeLonge	"What's My Age Again?" single (1999)	3:13

UK and Canadian bonus tracks
No.	Title	Writer(s)	Original release	Length
18.	"I Won't Be Home for Christmas"	Hoppus; DeLonge; Raynor	"I Won't Be Home for Christmas" single (2001)	3:17
19.	"Go" (BBC Radio 1 session)	Hoppus; DeLonge; Barker	"I Miss You" single (2004)	1:51

Japanese bonus tracks
No.	Title	Writer(s)	Original release	Length
18.	"I Won't Be Home for Christmas"	Hoppus; DeLonge; Raynor	"I Won't Be Home for Christmas" single (1997)	3:17
19.	"Don't Tell Me It's Over"	Hoppus; DeLonge; Barker	"First Date" single (2001)	2:33
20.	"I Miss You" (live in Minneapolis)	Hoppus; DeLonge; Barker	"Always" single (2004)	3:58

SRC vinyl bonus track
No.	Title	Writer(s)	Original release	Length
18.	"I Won't Be Home for Christmas"	Hoppus; DeLonge; Raynor	Released as a single in 1997; made first album release on A Santa Cause: It's a Punk Rock Christmas (2003)	3:17

Greatest Hits DVD
No.	Title	Director(s)	Length
1.	"Dammit"	Darren Doane; Ken Daurio	2:51
2.	"Josie"	Doane; Daurio	3:36
3.	"What's My Age Again?"	Marcos Siega	2:27
4.	"All the Small Things"	Siega	2:53
5.	"Adam's Song"	Liz Friedlander	4:14
6.	"Man Overboard"	Siega	2:56
7.	"The Rock Show"	The Malloys	3:08
8.	"Stay Together for the Kids" (original version)	Samuel Bayer	3:32
9.	"First Date"	The Malloys	3:58
10.	"Feeling This"	David LaChapelle	3:09
11.	"I Miss You"	Jonas Åkerlund	3:50
12.	"Down"	Estevan Oriol	3:17
13.	"Always"	Joseph Kahn	4:12

Deluxe edition bonus DVD
No.	Title	Length
1.	"What's My Age Again?" (live in Chicago)	3:36
2.	"Anthem Part Two" (live in Chicago)	2:34
3.	"Carousel" (live in Chicago)	2:39
4.	"Feeling This" (making of the video)	2:01
5.	"I Miss You" (making of the video)	2:01
6.	"Down" (recording and the video)	5:06
7.	"Greatest Hits Trailer"	3:03

== Personnel ==
Credits adapted from the album's liner notes.

Blink-182

- Mark Hoppus – vocals, bass
- Tom DeLonge – vocals, guitars
- Travis Barker – drums

Additional musicians

- Scott Raynor – drums on "Carousel", "M+M's", "Dammit", "Josie" and "I Won't Be Home for Christmas" (on international edition)
- Roger Joseph Manning Jr. – keyboards
- Scott Russo – backing vocals on "Josie"

Artwork

- SA Studios – art direction
- Estavan Oriol – photography
- Rob Abeyta – design
- Mister Cartoon – illustration

Production

- O – producer of "Carousel" and "M+M's"
- Mark Trombino – producer and keyboards on "Dammit", "Josie", producer on "I Won't Be Home for Christmas" (on international edition)
- Jerry Finn – producer, mix engineer of "Feeling This", "Not Now", and "Another Girl, Another Planet"
- Blink-182 – producer of "Another Girl, Another Planet"
- Miti Adhikari – producer of "Go" (BBC Radio 1 Session) (on international edition)
- Tom Lord-Alge – mix engineer
- Steve Kravac – mix engineer of "Carousel" and "M+M's"
- Ryan Hewitt – mix engineer of "Always" and on "I Miss You (Live in Minneapolis)" (on Japanese edition)
- Joe McGrath – engineer on "Don't Tell Me That It's Over" (on Japanese edition)
- Brian Gardner – mastering
- Dave Collins – mastering on "I Miss You (Live in Minneapolis)" (on Japanese edition)

== Charts ==
=== Weekly charts ===
Chart (2005–2006)	Peak position
Australian Albums (ARIA)	4
Austrian Albums (Ö3 Austria)	21
Belgian Albums (Ultratop Flanders)	61
Canadian Albums (Billboard)	3
German Albums (Offizielle Top 100)	26
Irish Albums (IRMA)	22
Italian Albums (FIMI)	28
Japanese Albums (Oricon	29
New Zealand Albums (RMNZ)	23
Scottish Albums (Official Charts)	5
Swiss Albums (Schweizer Hitparade)	45
UK Albums (Official Charts)	6
UK Rock & Metal Albums (Official Charts)	1
US Billboard 200	6
US Top Rock Albums (Billboard)	10

Chart (2020–2025)	Peak position
Greek Albums (IFPI)	29
US Top Alternative Albums (Billboard)	11

=== DVD ===
Chart (2005)	Peak position
Australia Top 40 DVD (ARIA)	7

=== Year-end charts ===
Chart (2005)	Position
Australian Albums (ARIA)	54
UK Albums (OCC)	80
Chart (2006)	Position
US Billboard 200	199
Chart (2021)	Position
US Top Rock Albums (Billboard)	32
Chart (2022)	Position
US Billboard 200	200
US Top Rock Albums (Billboard)	34
Chart (2024)	Position
US Billboard 200	169
Chart (2025)	Position
US Billboard 200	183

== Certifications ==
Region	Certification	Certified units/sales
Australia (ARIA)	3× Platinum	210,000^{^}
Canada (Music Canada)	Platinum	100,000^{^}
Germany (BVMI)	Platinum	200,000^{‡}
Italy (FIMI) sales since 2009	Gold	25,000^{*}
New Zealand (RMNZ)	Gold	7,500^{^}
United Kingdom (BPI)	3× Platinum	900,000^{‡}
^{*} Sales figures based on certification alone.^{^} Shipments figures based on certification alone.^{‡} Sales+streaming figures based on certification alone.
