= Cheshire Cat (Blink-182 album) =

1995 studio album by Blink-182

- Original cover with original band name (Note: Current pressings use the same cover, but with the added "-182" in the band name.)

Studio album by Blink
- Released: February 17, 1995
- Recorded: 1994
- Studios: Westbeach Recorders, Los Angeles, California
- Genres: Skate punk; punk rock; pop-punk
- Length: 41:59
- Label: Cargo
- Producer: Otis Barthoulameu

Blink-182 chronology
Buddha (1994)	Cheshire Cat (1995)	Dude Ranch (1997)

Singles from Cheshire Cat
- 1. "M+M's" Released: September 6, 1995; 2. "Wasting Time" Released: June 28, 1996

Cheshire Cat is the debut studio album by the American rock band Blink-182 (then known as simply Blink), released on February 17, 1995, by Cargo Music. The trio, composed of guitarist Tom DeLonge, bassist Mark Hoppus, and drummer Scott Raynor, formed in 1992 and recorded three demos that impressed the San Diego-based Cargo label. The album captures the band at a formative and early stage, blending power-chord riffs, brisk tempos, and melodic hooks with irreverent humor and juvenile antics.

Recorded under tight time constraints mainly at Westbeach Recorders in Los Angeles, the trio laid down the sixteen tracks with minimal overdubs, emphasizing spontaneity and rawness. Influenced by punk stalwarts such as NOFX, the Vandals, and the Descendents, the band injected humor and personality into every track, from cheeky joke songs to more earnest explorations of relationships and self-doubt. It was produced by Otis Barthoulameu, of local act Fluf. The album was originally released with the band's name as Blink, until an Irish band of the same name threatened legal action, after which the band appended "-182" to the end of their name.

Cheshire Cat attracted fans with its speed, humor, and accessibility, and was released as the genre was breaking on a national level. While an indie release with limited initial distribution, the album sold steadily, fueled by grassroots promotion in skate magazines and local radio play. "M+M's" and "Wasting Time" were released as singles, while lead-off track "Carousel" became a fan favorite. The band supported the album by touring clubs across the U.S. and Australia. Cheshire Cat is cited by bands and fans as an iconic release, and has sold over 250,000 copies as of 2001.

== Background ==
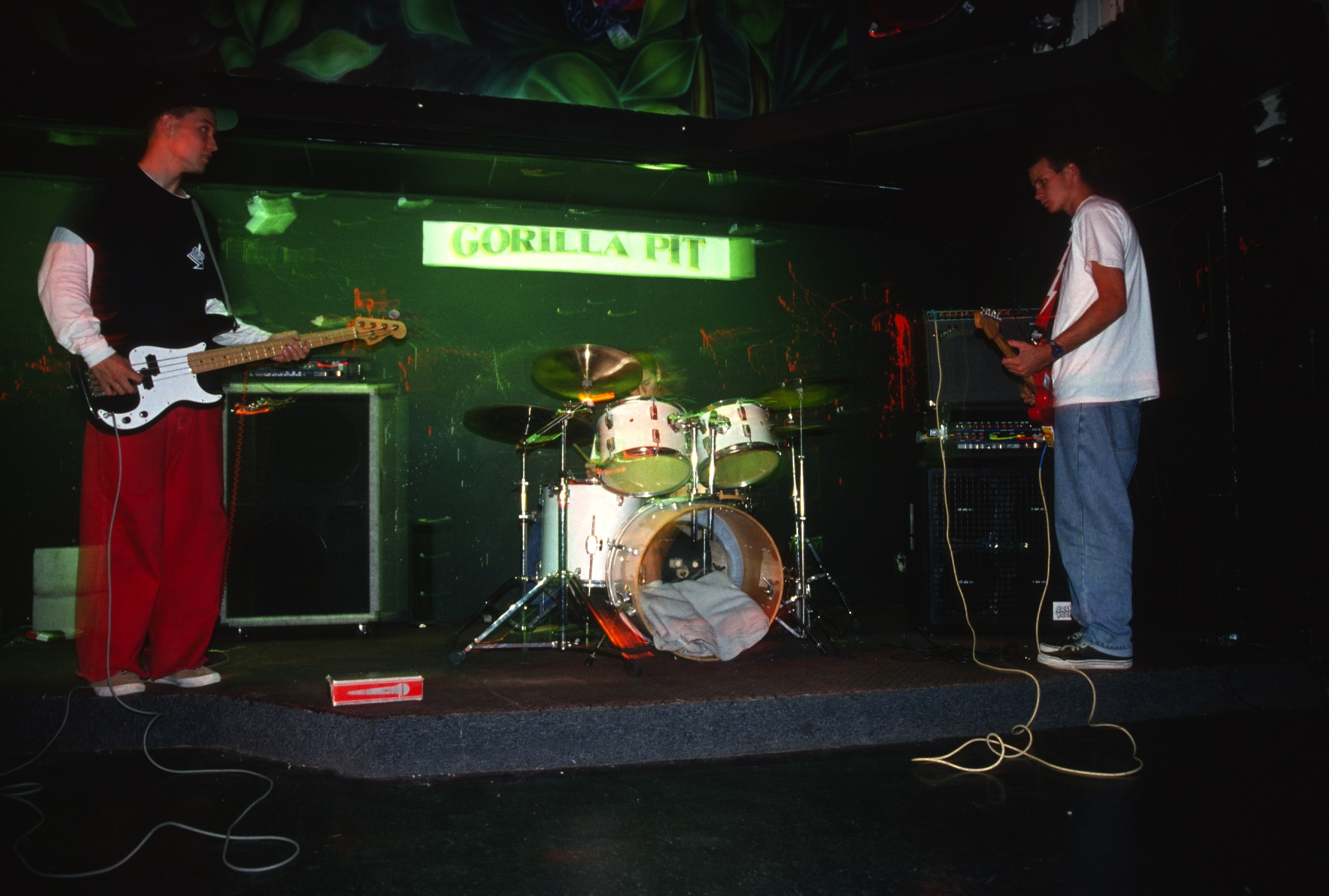
Blink performing at the Gorilla Pit in 1993. The show was only the band's second public performance.

Blink-182 was formed in San Diego in August 1992 when guitarist Tom DeLonge, bassist Mark Hoppus, and drummer Scott Raynor bonded over a shared appreciation for fast-paced punk rock and irreverent humor. Throughout 1993, the trio developed its sound while recording homemade demos and playing all-ages shows at bars, school lunch periods, YMCAs, Elks Lodges, and community centers. As the band's reputation grew, Blink-182 became regular performers at SOMA, initially playing its small basement venue known as the Dungeon before graduating to the club's main stage, where they opened for national punk acts such as Face to Face. By 1994, the band had established a devoted local following through constant touring across Southern California and the regional success of its independently released demo Buddha.

While Blink-182 occupied a different corner of San Diego's music scene, the band's rise coincided with a period of heightened industry attention on the city. Following the breakthrough of Nirvana, major labels sought to capitalize on the commercial success of grunge by signing alternative rock acts across the United States. By the mid-1990s, San Diego had emerged as one of the country's most closely watched regional music scenes, with journalists dubbing it "the Next Seattle" for its burgeoning wave of so-called "nouveau grunge" bands. The scene produced groups including Rocket from the Crypt and Drive Like Jehu. At the center of the movement was independent label Cargo Music, whose roster became synonymous with San Diego's underground rock scene.

Although Blink-182's humorous take on melodic skate punk contrasted sharply with Cargo's reputation for serious post-hardcore acts, the local success of Buddha attracted the label's attention through the efforts of three early supporters. Pat Secor, who had financed the recording of Buddha, promoted the band through a roommate connected to Cargo executives. Otis "O" Bartholameu of the Cargo-signed band Fluf, who was a prominent figure in San Diego's skateboarding and punk communities, became one of Blink-182's earliest champions, promoting the trio to his label despite skepticism that the younger group fit the label's image. Brahm Goodis, the teenage son of Cargo president Eric Goodis, repeatedly urged his father to sign the band, even leaving a Buddha cassette in his father's car stereo in hopes he would listen to it. Their combined advocacy eventually persuaded Cargo executives to attend a blink-182 performance and begin negotiations.

Cargo initially offered to release only a seven-inch EP, but Blink-182 declined, having already begun planning to finance and release a full-length album independently. Rather than lose the band, Cargo instead signed Blink-182 to a recording contract on a "trial basis," releasing the group's music through the newly established "Grilled Cheese" imprint. Goodis was reportedly not enthusiastic about signing Blink-182, and created the subsidiary to keep the band separate from the label's main roster. Because Raynor was still a minor, only Hoppus could legally sign, while DeLonge—who was working a construction job delivering cement—was absent. A friend signed DeLonge's name in his place, a substitution that reportedly went unnoticed.

== Recording and production ==
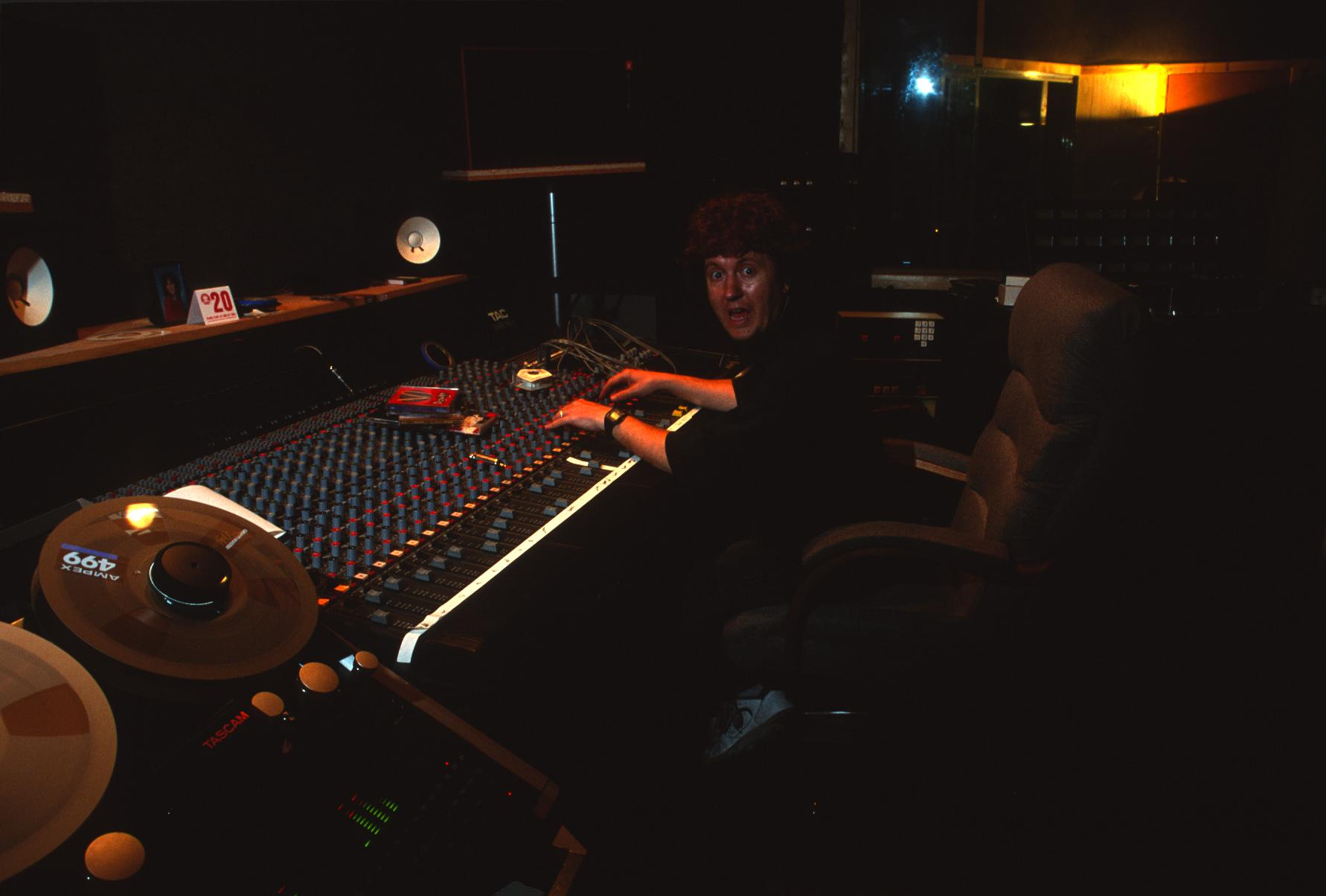
Jeff Forrest at Doubletime Studios, where the band went for additional recording

Recording began shortly after blink-182 signed with Cargo Music. The band traveled to Westbeach Recorders in Hollywood, a studio owned by members of Bad Religion and renowned for recordings by NOFX, Pennywise, Rancid, and the Offspring, among others. Cargo advanced the group a budget of $1,500—more than the band had initially believed they needed—and booked only three days to record and mix the album. For Blink-182, who had previously recorded only local demos, the opportunity to work at Westbeach represented their first experience in a major recording studio. Hoppus later recalled feeling "way out of our league," remembering that after being instructed to bring reel-to-reel recording tape, he had no idea where to buy it or how much was needed.

The sessions began inauspiciously when the band, unfamiliar with Los Angeles, became lost while driving to the studio and arrived nearly three hours late. With little time to spare, Blink-182 worked ten- to twelve-hour days in an effort to complete sixteen songs before their booking expired. Hoppus later recalled being intimidated by Westbeach's reputation, describing the studio as "hallowed ground" because so many of the band's musical heroes had recorded there. Guitarist Tom DeLonge recorded portions of the album through Bad Religion guitarist Brett Gurewitz's amplifier, while the band accidentally broke one of Gurewitz's microphones during the sessions. Each evening, the trio ate inexpensive burritos from a nearby taco shop before returning to a rundown motel, where all three members slept together in a single bed to save money.

Engineer Steve Kravac, then Westbeach's house engineer, recalled that the band's limited budget left virtually no opportunity for experimentation. Blink-182 recorded largely live on the studio floor using minimal equipment, with only occasional retakes and little time to refine arrangements or overdub additional parts. Kravac later said he had hoped to rent better amplifiers and schedule additional overdubs, but the budget made such improvements impossible. In retrospect, he believed the rushed, stripped-down approach contributed to the album's raw and energetic sound. Despite the intensive schedule, the three-day booking proved insufficient to complete the album. Recording resumed at Doubletime Studios in Santee, California, where the band had previously recorded Buddha, with producer Otis "O" Bartholameu and engineer Jeff Forrest. Forrest recalled the sessions as fast-paced but relaxed, noting the band's youthful sense of humor and preference for capturing performances quickly rather than overthinking them.

The sessions carried additional uncertainty for drummer Scott Raynor. With his family having already relocated to Reno, Nevada, Raynor remained in San Diego by staying with his sister for the summer, believing the album would likely mark his final work with the band. After the sessions concluded, Raynor moved to Reno and was briefly replaced by school friend Mike Krull. Hoppus and DeLonge, however, soon persuaded Raynor to return to the band, and he moved back to San Diego to live with Hoppus and his family while completing his high school education through homeschooling.

== Packaging and artwork ==
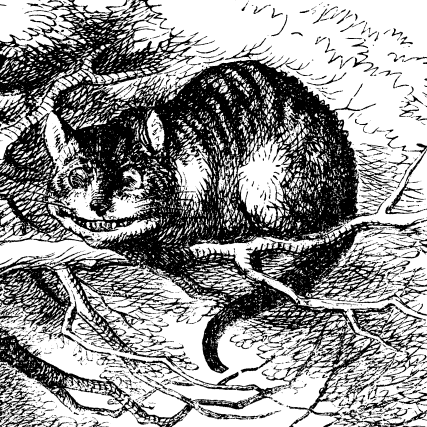
The album takes its name after the Cheshire Cat from the Lewis Carroll novel Alice's Adventures in Wonderland.

The album's title was inspired by the Cheshire Cat, the enigmatic feline from Lewis Carroll's Alice's Adventures in Wonderland. At the time, Hoppus was studying literature at San Diego State University, and later recalled he had long admired the character, describing it as "unknowable" and likening it to "The Fool of both Shakespeare and tarot." The cover image originated after Tom DeLonge, then working at a construction supply warehouse, purchased a cat calendar from a door-to-door salesman. Hoppus identified a photograph of a Siamese cat with bright blue eyes as resembling the Cheshire Cat, and the band selected it as the basis for the album artwork.

The calendar company declined the band's request to license the photograph, prompting Cargo Records' art department to digitally alter the image to avoid copyright infringement. The finished package paired the cat illustration with a collage of photographs documenting the band during the recording sessions, while prominently featuring the international accessibility symbol, which Blink-182 occasionally used as an early logo. Reflecting on the design decades later, DeLonge jokingly described it as "the worst album cover ever." In a retrospective feature on memorable cat-themed album covers, NME compared the artwork for Cheshire Cat to releases by Wavves and Best Coast, citing it as one of rock music's most recognizable feline album sleeves.

== Composition ==
"M+M's"
A sound sample of lead single "M+M's". The track exemplifies the southern California skate punk sound. Journalist Joe Shooman described it as "Blink in microcosm," commenting that, "in less than three minutes they nail their sonic colors to the mast."

Musically, Cheshire Cat combines fast-paced skate punk with melodic hooks inspired by bands such as the Vandals, the Descendents, and NOFX. The LP has comparatively intricate guitar work, particularly in DeLonge's riffs, which critics have noted are more technical than much of the band's later output. At the time of the album's release, he rejected straightforward comparisons to traditional punk rock, remarking, "We're nothing like the Sex Pistols, but our music kind of flowed from this genre of fast music with melody." He also acknowledged the band's influences, stating, "Every song of ours is a version of another punk song that I've heard and tried to make better. In the end, ours wind up a little different, but I know where the influence came from, and I think it's important to acknowledge that." The album also introduced DeLonge's signature nasal vocal style. Hoppus said the band drew little conscious inspiration from first-wave punk, remarking, "Whatever punk is, is whatever people want it to be... We just kind of like the music we write." Describing the band's songwriting in 1995, Hoppus said blink-182 aimed to write songs that were both faster and more melodic than its earlier material, while drawing lyrics from "things that happen to us specifically, things we see happen to our friends."

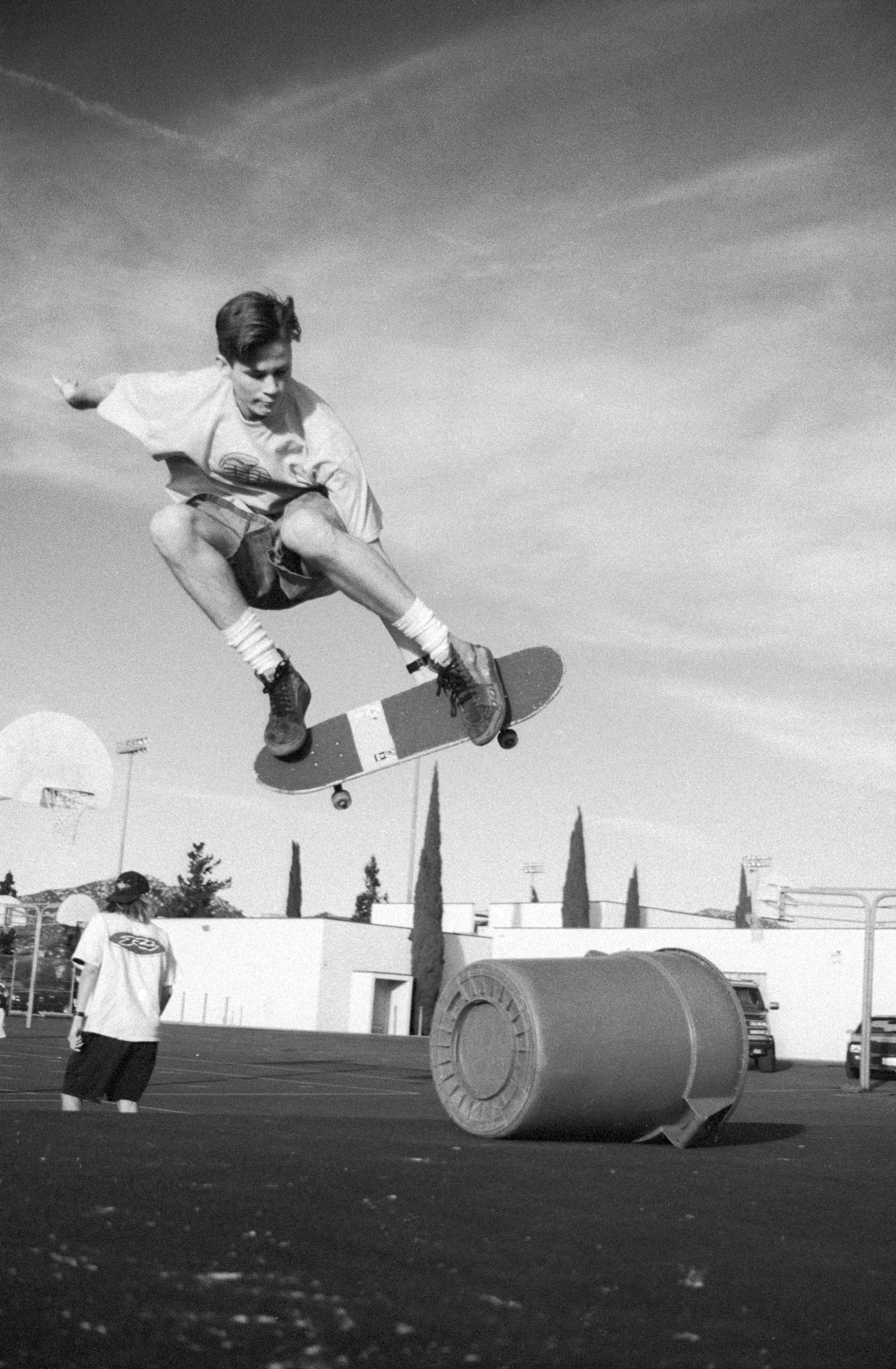
Tom DeLonge skateboarding during the Cheshire Cat era. The band's early identity was closely tied to Southern California's skateboarding culture.

Lyrically, the album reflects the band's teenage perspective, alternating between adolescent humor, relationships, and youthful frustration. The Los Angeles Times observed in 1995 that Blink-182's songs "poke fun at their own youthful escapades", focusing on "raging hormones, candy, masturbation, intestinal gas and other topics of interest to adolescents", while noting that a recurring theme throughout the album was the refusal to grow up. The Age described Cheshire Cat as being filled with "fast, razor-sharp guitar songs about girls, cars, television and wee-wee." Much of the album centers on high school life: "Touchdown Boy" satirizes the social hierarchy of teenage jocks through the eyes of an awkward student, complete with a mock football commentary interlude, while "Peggy Sue" explores teenage rebellion and resentment toward overbearing parents. Other songs take a more lighthearted approach, including "TV", an ode to wasting time watching television, and "Wasting Time", in which Hoppus portrays an infatuated teenager desperate to impress a girl. Romantic insecurity also informs songs such as "Fentoozler", "Does My Breath Smell?", and "Romeo and Rebecca", which variously depict deteriorating relationships, awkward dates, and unrequited affection.

Despite its reputation for juvenile humor, the album also contains more introspective material. "Strings" compares commitment to being controlled like a puppet, while the slower-paced "Cacophony" examines emotional imbalance and uncertainty within a relationship, revealing what biographer Joe Shooman described as a more sensitive side of the band often overshadowed by its comedic image. The band's irreverent sense of humor is most evident on the album's closing bonus tracks. "Ben Wah Balls" and "Depends" revolve around deliberately crude subjects—including incest and adult diapers—while "Just About Done" consists largely of nonsensical shouting to emulate some sort of tribal party. Hoppus at the time characterized the band's humor as "boyish junior high-type humor", explaining, "We don't take ourselves or anything else very seriously." Hoppus agreed that the band's lighthearted approach contrasted with the dominant rock trends of the era, arguing that while there was "a place" for grunge's "deep issues and tortured artists", there was also room for "fast music" where "it's OK to feel happy, too." Several tracks, including "Carousel", "Fentoozler", and "Toast and Bananas", were re-recorded from the band's earlier demos.

== Critical reception ==
Reviewing the album in 1995, Christina Lee Knauss of The Sun News wrote that Cheshire Cat explored "the spectrum of the punk-rock lifestyle", commending the album's melodic songwriting and "oddly introspective lyrics" beneath its "solid wall of punk guitar." Writing in 1996, The Age argued that blink-182 exemplified a new generation of punk bands that emphasized fun and personal experiences over the anger and political commentary of earlier punk, and suggested that its carefree outlook served as an antidote to the "angst and nihilism" associated with grunge. Mark Faulkner of The Florida Times-Union called it "one of the most engaging punk rock efforts in recent years."

Retrospective reviews have generally viewed Cheshire Cat as an energetic, if uneven, introduction to Blink-182's signature style. Writing for AllMusic, Stephen Thomas Erlewine awarded the album three out of five stars, calling it "scattershot" but noting that it revealed the band's potential and was best appreciated by dedicated fans. Rolling Stone similarly described the record as an early attempt to fuse melodic hooks with skate punk ("a sort of pop hardcore"), awarding it two-and-a-half stars. Jason Heller of The A.V. Club argued that the album's "refreshing sloppiness and wide-eyed exuberance" distinguished it from contemporaneous releases on Fat Wreck Chords and Epitaph, while AbsolutePunk considered it "a good early indicator" of Blink-182's future sound despite its rough production. Fuse later named Cheshire Cat one of pop-punk's strongest debut albums, writing that the band had made the punk rock it loved "even catchier". Joe Lynch of Billboard dubbed it an "underground classic."

Critics have also highlighted the album's youthful energy and lasting influence. NME's Ali Shutler described Cheshire Cat as "the sound of a young punk band whose ambition is greater than their actual talent", while praising Scott Raynor's frenetic drumming and the emerging "brilliant" songwriting partnership between Hoppus and DeLonge. Collin Brennan of Consequence called it the definitive document of blink-182's formative years, arguing that the band "would never sound truer to themselves" than on its debut, while Rob Harvilla at The Ringer praised its emotional sincerity, contending that the group's embrace of adolescent awkwardness became one of its defining strengths. Although Kerrang! ranked the album last among blink-182's studio releases, it nevertheless concluded that Cheshire Cat "remains one of the most cherished records of the '90s pop-punk scene."

== Commercial performance ==
Upon its release, Cheshire Cat received little critical attention outside Southern California owing to its independent distribution, though it became a strong seller for Cargo Music and steadily built Blink-182's reputation through word of mouth and touring. The band received their first profile in the Los Angeles Times in December 1995, which praised the album but questioned their authenticity and "punk" label. "I mean, is it the retro rock of England's Exploited, the anarchy of the Ramones or the political focus of Bad Religion? Punk has gone off in so many different directions that you can't really classify it anymore," DeLonge said. "People said Elvis Costello was punk when he first came out."

Cargo promoted the album with adverts in skateboarding magazines, such as Thrasher.

Despite its modest release, Cheshire Cat exceeded Cargo's expectations, benefiting from college radio airplay and widespread unauthorized CD copies that circulated beyond Southern California. The label initially pressed only 1,000 copies, with Cargo owner Eric Goodis reportedly betting employees that the album would not sell beyond its first pressing. Hoppus later recalled that while some label employees embraced the band, others dismissed blink-182's fast, irreverent style as too juvenile for Cargo's roster. Nevertheless, the album quickly exhausted its initial pressing and became Cargo's best-selling release, driven by the band's relentless touring and growing following throughout California and Australia. Within a year, the album had sold 70,000 copies, and by 2001, Cheshire Cat had moved more than 250,000 units. Disc jockey Mike Halloran of San Diego station 91X made "M+M's" a regular part of his playlist, giving the band its first significant radio exposure. The song's local success prompted Cargo to finance a music video directed by Darren Doane, although MTV declined to air it after objecting to imagery depicting firearms.

The band's increasing visibility also led to a trademark dispute with an Irish electronic group named Blink. The band sent a cease-and-desist letter, arguing that they held legal rights to the name in the United States. Blink initially resisted the change, but after Cargo warned that the band would likely lose any legal challenge, the label issued an ultimatum that a new name be chosen immediately. Frustrated by months of indecision, Hoppus spontaneously suggested adding the number "182", a proposal that Cargo accepted on the spot. Over the years, the band has offered numerous tongue-in-cheek explanations for the significance of "182", including that it represented Hoppus' ideal weight or the number of times the word "fuck" is spoken in the film Scarface. Hoppus later acknowledged that these stories were intentionally fabricated and that the number was chosen arbitrarily during the phone call with Cargo.

== Touring and GoodTimes ==
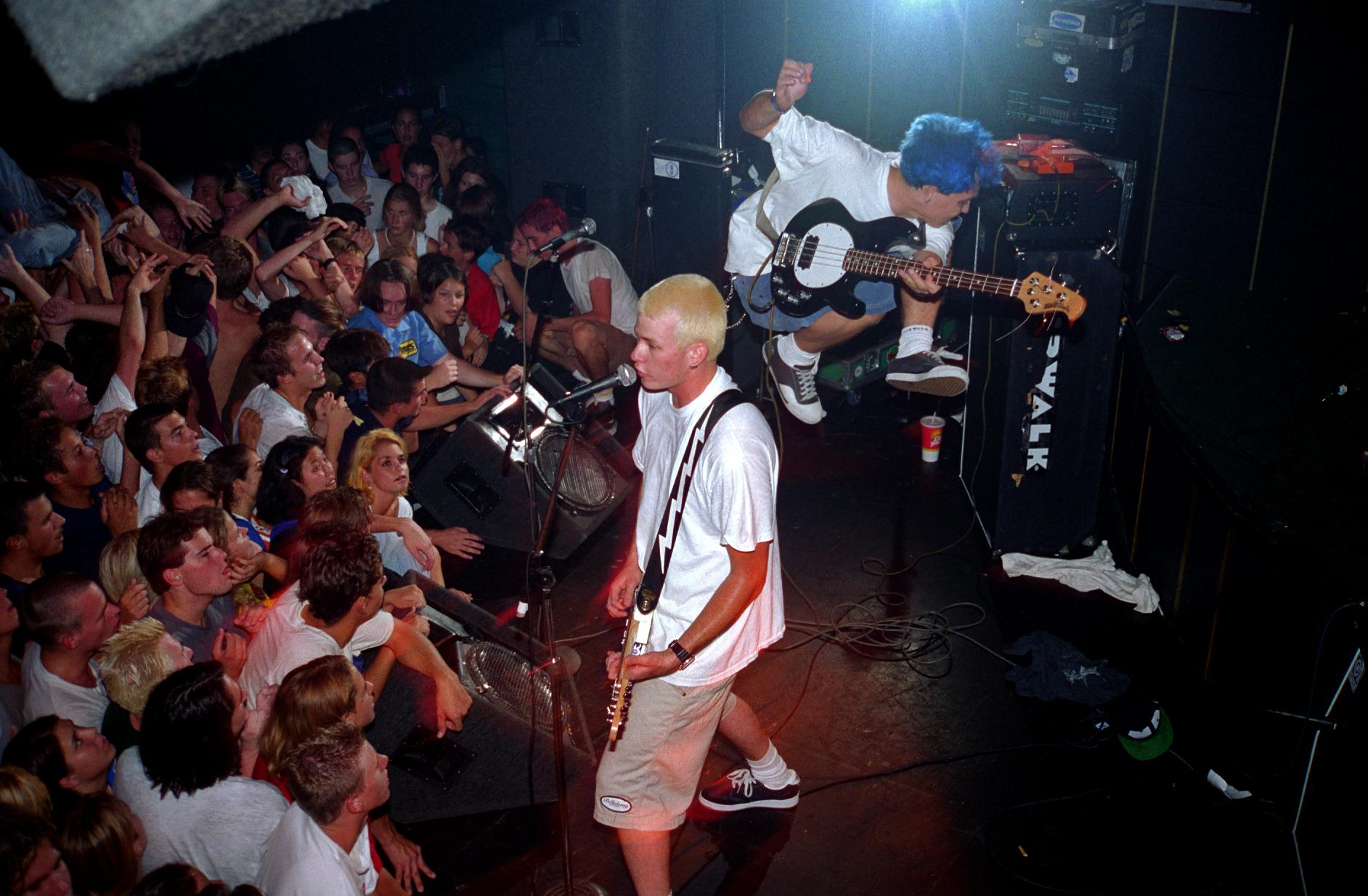
Blink-182 at the Showcase Theater in Corona, California, in 1995.

Following the release of Cheshire Cat, Blink-182 embarked on an intensive touring schedule. The trio initially concentrated on weekend runs throughout the American Southwest, driving to cities such as Los Angeles, San Francisco, Las Vegas, and Phoenix. To support the growing number of dates, Blink-182 purchased its first touring van and enlisted Rick DeVoe, a San Diego concert promoter, as its manager. DeVoe used his connections within the region's punk, skateboarding, and surfing communities to secure higher-profile support slots and place the band's music in influential surf and skate videos. The band's growing profile also attracted the attention of the Tahoe Agency, which became the band's booking agent.

The band's exposure increased substantially in 1995 when their music appeared in Taylor Steele's surf film GoodTimes, introducing Blink-182 to a wider audience alongside artists such as Pennywise and 7 Seconds. Later that year, the group joined the film's accompanying Good Times Tour, a two-week trek along the East Coast that marked its first national tour. Traveling on guarantees as low as $50 per night, the band routinely slept in its van, on fans' floors, or crowded into inexpensive motel rooms while financing each day's drive through merchandise sales. The tour was not without incident: DeLonge was arrested for underage drinking following a Halloween performance in Jacksonville, Florida, while another show ended in a riot after security guards clashed with concertgoers. Hoppus' sister Anne supplemented the band's income by producing T-shirts, later recalling that nearly every dollar earned was reinvested into gasoline to drive to the next city.

Blink-182's growing reputation also led to its first international performances. At the end of 1995, Pennywise invited the group to open its Australian tour, even covering the band's airfare despite Blink-182 having virtually no audience in the country. The tour coincided with the rising popularity of Southern California punk in Australia, fueled in part by imported surf videos featuring Blink-182's music. Hoppus recalled being surprised when audiences sang along to "Lemmings", describing it as surreal to hear fans on the opposite side of the world already familiar with the band's songs. Earlier in the year, Pennywise also brought Blink-182 to Alaska for a snowboarding competition, where a prank war between the two bands culminated in police intervention and hotel security ejecting both groups. Raynor later reflected that the constant touring steadily expanded the band's audience, recalling that "the next time we came around we had more fans and better floors to sleep on."

In 1996, DeVoe secured Blink-182 a place on the second annual Vans Warped Tour, exposing the trio to its largest audiences to date alongside acts including Fishbone, The Mighty Mighty Bosstones, NOFX, Pennywise, and Rocket from the Crypt. Unable to afford transportation between venues, Blink-182 traveled on a production bus with the festival's crew and athletes while performing thirty-minute sets across North America. The group also undertook a winter headlining run later nicknamed the "Shitty Weather Tour", enduring severe rain and snow, including a seventeen-hour drive through one of the largest snowstorms to strike the northeastern United States in decades. By the conclusion of the Cheshire Cat touring cycle, Blink-182 had toured the contiguous United States three times, in addition to visits to Alaska, Australia, and Hawaii, establishing a loyal following. Warped had especially proved a turning point in the band's profile, introducing Blink-182 to thousands of concertgoers during the mid-1990s punk revival and laying the groundwork for its breakthrough.

== Legacy ==
Although overshadowed commercially by the band's later releases, Cheshire Cat has developed a lasting cult following and is frequently cited as an influential early pop-punk record. In a retrospective review, Pranav Trewn Stereogum described Cheshire Cat as "a scrappy collection of tongue-in-cheek tantrums" that followed the commercial breakthroughs of NOFX's Punk in Drublic and Bad Religion's Stranger Than Fiction, arguing that it established Blink-182 as contemporaries of the rapidly rising melodic punk scene. Consequence argued that its combination of melody and irreverence became a blueprint for later bands such as Mom Jeans and Modern Baseball.

The album has also been cited as a formative influence by musicians across multiple genres. Mikey Way, bassist of My Chemical Romance, has said Cheshire Cat was the first album he ever purchased, while Ryan Key, frontman of Yellowcard, described seeing blink-182 on the album's touring cycle as his first punk rock concert. Electronic producer Steve Aoki and rapper Travis Mills have likewise credited Cheshire Cat with introducing them to blink-182 and shaping their early musical tastes. The album has also been cited as a formative influence outside the punk community. Comedian Whitmer Thomas recalled receiving the album from his brother as a child and learning its songs on bass guitar, later describing blink-182 as "the gateway to all cool music" because it led him to discover bands such as Descendents and The Cure.

Many critics have singled out "Carousel" and "M+M's" as the most enduring highlights from Cheshire Cat. Both songs were later added to the band's Greatest Hits compilation. Hoppus acknowledged both songs as early signs of the songwriting that would later define the band. Reflecting on the album decades later, Hoppus likened revisiting Cheshire Cat to looking at a junior high school yearbook photo: "a bit embarrassing," but an accurate snapshot of who the band was at the time. Future Blink-182 drummer Travis Barker first became familiar with the band during the Cheshire Cat era. In his memoir, Barker recalled that an the album received far more coverage than his band Feeble in a local fanzine, a disparity that initially frustrated him. After touring with Blink-182 in 1998, however, he wrote that he came to admire both the band and its music.

== Track listing ==
All tracks are written by Tom DeLonge and Mark Hoppus. Additional lyrics on "Wasting Time" by Jeff Forrest.

Cheshire Cat track listing
No.	Title	Lead vocals	Length
1.	"Carousel"	DeLonge	3:15
2.	"M+M's"	Hoppus	2:40
3.	"Fentoozler"	Hoppus	2:05
4.	"Touchdown Boy"	DeLonge	3:11
5.	"Strings"	Hoppus	2:26
6.	"Peggy Sue"	DeLonge	2:38
7.	"Sometimes"	Hoppus	1:09
8.	"Does My Breath Smell?"	DeLonge	2:38
9.	"Cacophony"	Hoppus	3:06
10.	"TV"	Hoppus	1:42
11.	"Toast and Bananas"	DeLonge	2:43
12.	"Wasting Time"	Hoppus	2:49
13.	"Romeo and Rebecca"	DeLonge	2:34
14.	"Ben Wah Balls"	DeLonge	3:56
15.	"Just About Done"	Hoppus; DeLonge	2:16
16.	"Depends"	DeLonge; Hoppus	2:51
Total length:			41:59

Japanese bonus tracks
No.	Title	Lead vocals	Length
17.	"Zulu"	DeLonge	2:06
18.	"Lemmings" (re-recorded for Dude Ranch)	Hoppus	2:45
Total length:			46:50

== Personnel ==
Blink

- Tom DeLonge – guitars, vocals
- Mark Hoppus – bass, vocals
- Scott Raynor – drums

Additional performers

- Matt Houts – introduction on "Ben Wah Balls"

Technical personnel

- O – production
- Steve Kravac – engineer
- Jeff Forrest ("The King of Santee") – mixing engineer
- Jeff Motch – layout

== Charts ==
=== Weekly charts ===
Chart performance for Cheshire Cat
Chart (1996)	Peak position
Australian Albums (ARIA)	73
Chart (2000)	Peak position
New Zealand Albums (RMNZ)	27

=== Certifications ===
Certifications for Cheshire Cat
Region	Certification	Certified units/sales
United Kingdom (BPI)	Silver	60,000^{^}
^{^} Shipments figures based on certification alone.

== Release history ==
Release history and formats for Cheshire Cat
Region	Date	Label	Format	Catalog	Ref.
United States	February 17, 1995	Cargo Music	CD	CRGD 86136	
United States	February 17, 1995	Grilled Cheese	CD	GRL-001	
United States	February 17, 1995	Grilled Cheese	Cassette	GRL-001	
United States	1996	Grilled Cheese	LP	GRL-001	
Japan	1996	Toy's Factory	CD	TFCK-88798	
United Kingdom	1998	Geffen	CD	486 136-2	
Russia	2002	Universal Music Russia	CD	486 136-9	
United States	2010	Geffen / Universal Music Special Markets	LP	B0014942-01	

== Sources ==
- Hoppus, Anne (October 1, 2001). Blink-182: Tales from Beneath Your Mom. MTV Books / Pocket Books. ISBN 0-7434-2207-4.
- Hoppus, Mark; Ozzi, Dan (2025). Fahrenheit-182: A Memoir. Little, Brown. ISBN 978-1-4087-2455-2.
- Shooman, Joe (June 24, 2010). Blink-182: The Bands, The Breakdown & The Return. Independent Music Press. ISBN 978-1-906191-10-8.
