= Not Now =

2005 single by Blink-182

Single by Blink-182

from the album Greatest Hits
- Released: November 28, 2005
- Recorded: 2003
- Studio: Signature Sound, Rolling Thunder (San Diego, California); Conway Recording (Hollywood, California)
- Genre: Pop-punk
- Length: 4:09 (original edit); 4:23 (alternate edit)
- Label: Geffen; Island
- Songwriters: Tom DeLonge; Mark Hoppus; Travis Barker
- Producer: Jerry Finn

Blink-182 singles chronology
| "Always" (2004) | "Not Now" (2005) | "Up All Night" (2011) |

"Not Now" is a song by American rock band Blink-182. It was released in November 2005 as the sole single from the group's first compilation album, Greatest Hits (2005), through Geffen Records. "Not Now" explores concepts of death and its impact on those one leaves behind, and was written from the perspective of an out-of-body experience. Stylistically, it builds heavily around the band's trademark power chords and guitar riffs, and also employs a church organ to achieve a funereal atmosphere.

"Not Now" shares writing credits between the band's three members: guitarist Tom DeLonge, bassist Mark Hoppus, and drummer Travis Barker. It was produced and mixed by Jerry Finn. "Not Now" would be the band's last single before their four-year hiatus from 2005 to 2009. As the band had broken up by its release, the song's music video recycles clips from their past videos, concerts, and tours.

An outtake from the band's untitled 2003 album, "Not Now" had previously been released as a standalone single for iTunes and elsewhere prior to its inclusion on Greatest Hits. The song reached number 18 on Billboard's Hot Modern Rock Tracks chart and number 30 on the UK Singles Chart.

== Background ==
"Not Now" was originally recorded by the band for its self-titled 2003 album. According to DeLonge, the song is about an out-of-body experience after death, and being able to visualize your loss and its impact on loved ones. An early rendition, captured on a webcam, depicts DeLonge working through developing the song's words; an early rendition went "let's dance until I’m gone / I'm here hold on / to me, goodbye I'm leaving."

== Composition ==
The song's guitar riffs were compared to the Descendents by journalist Joe Shooman, and are interspersed by verses containing a church organ. Matt Mitchell of Paste also noted the similarities to the Descendents, dubbing the song "a tight, riff-heavy, pop-punk performance".

== Release and commercial performance ==
"Not Now" was first released for download on the nascent iTunes Music Store on the day of the album's release. It was included as a bonus track on the UK edition of Blink-182, although it is unclear why it was originally left off the track listing of the international edition. The song was also included on Atticus: ...Dragging the Lake, Vol. 3 (2005), a compilation album released by DeLonge's clothing company, Atticus Clothing. Both of these physical releases are a slightly shorter edit, where the bridge is shortened, making it roughly 15 seconds shorter.

When the song was selected to be a single for the band's post-breakup Greatest Hits album, it ran into trouble with the trio's management, which were split between DeLonge (who remained with original Blink manager Rick DeVoe) and Hoppus/Barker (who switched to Irving Azoff to handle their new project, +44). The Azoff camp lobbied for the Hoppus-led "Another Girl, Another Planet" as the lead single, while DeVoe argued for "Not Now", which eventually won. "Not Now" was released to radio on October 18, 2005.

The song peaked at number 30 on the UK Singles Chart.

== Critical reception ==
"Not Now" received positive marks from contemporary music critics. Kieron Passaway in Kerrang! called it among the band's best, observing, "You can feel and hear the friction in the track [...] DeLonge appears to be pushing a separate sonic agenda which he eventually realized with Angels & Airwaves, while vocalist/bassist Mark Hoppus and drummer Travis Barker are busy reinforcing the trademark Blink sound." Matt Mitchell of Paste interpreted it as suggestive of the band's impending demise, writing, "DeLonge sings from the perspective of the song's protagonist, who, on the brink of death, much like the band at the time, keeps his loved ones close and promises to wait for them once he passes on."

== Music video ==
The music video features clips of the band's past music videos, concerts, and tours. There are two released versions of this video, but the only significant difference between them is that different clips from all of their videos are used.

There is also a third, possibly unofficial, video; this is seen on Australia's Channel [V]. In this version, the video is black and white and is made up of some of the band's previous music videos as well as some footage of their live performance in the 2000 Big Day Out during the bridge of the song.

== Format and track listing ==
US Enhanced CD (2005)

1. "Not Now" – 4:09
2. "I Miss You" (Live In Minneapolis) – 3:57
3. "I Won't Be Home for Christmas" – 3:16
4. "Not Now" (music video)

UK CD single (2005)

1. "Not Now" – 4:09
2. "Dammit" – 2:45

UK 7" single part 1 (2005)

1. "Not Now" – 4:09
2. "Dammit" – 2:45

UK 7" single part 2 (2005)

1. "Not Now" – 4:09
2. "All the Small Things" – 2:52

== Charts ==
Weekly chart performance for "Not Now"
| Chart (2005) | Peak position |
|---|---|
| Canada Rock Top 30 (Radio & Records) | 29 |
| European Hot 100 Singles (Billboard) | 88 |
| Ireland (IRMA) | 49 |
| Italy (FIMI) | 39 |
| UK Singles (Official Charts) | 30 |
| UK Rock & Metal (Official Charts) | 2 |
| US Modern Rock Tracks (Billboard) | 18 |

== Release history ==
| Region | Date | Format(s) | Label(s) | Ref. |
|---|---|---|---|---|
| United States | November 15, 2005 | Alternative radio | Geffen | |
| United Kingdom | November 28, 2005 | 7-inch vinyl; CD | Geffen; Island | |
