= Reeve Oliver =

American pop rock band

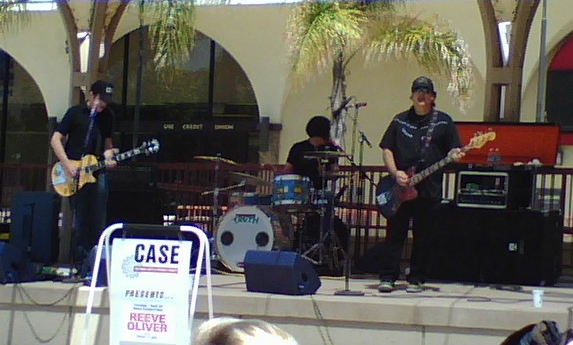
- Reeve Oliver performing at San Diego State University, April 2007. Left to right: Sean O'Donnell, Brad Davis, and O.

Background information
- Origin: San Diego, California
- Genres: Pop rock, Emo
- Years active: 2000–present
- Label: The Militia Group
- Members: Sean O'Donnell; Brad Davis
- Past members: O Jason Harper; Brandon Young
- Website: myspace.com/reeveoliver

Reeve Oliver is an American pop rock band formed in 2000 in San Diego, California. They have released two albums and several EPs and have toured with larger acts such as The Vandals, Yellowcard, and Switchfoot. They have been locally recognized at the San Diego Music Awards, earning "best rock album" in 2003 for The Reeveolution EP and again in 2005 for Reeve Oliver, and being named "best rock act" at the 2006 awards.

== Band history ==
Reeve Oliver was formed by vocalist/guitarist Sean O'Donnell while he was a member of the Christian punk band Dogwood. While writing songs for Dogwood, O'Donnell found himself writing more pop-based rock songs as well that did not fit the band's style. When Dogwood's album Building a Better Me was completed ahead of schedule, O'Donnell and Noise Ratchet drummer Brandon Young used the remaining studio time to record Reeve Oliver's first 5-song demo. O'Donnell left Dogwood in 2001 and he and Young formed Reeve Oliver as a full-time band, initially with Dogwood bassist Jason Harper who soon left and was replaced by Otis Bartholameu of the band Fluf (known simply by his first initial, O). Eventually Young's commitments to Noise Ratchet led to his replacement by Brad Davis, a longtime friend of O'Donnell's. O'Donnell and Davis also work as entertainers and show hosts at SeaWorld.

In 2003 Reeve Oliver was awarded "best rock album" at the San Diego Music Awards for The Reeveolution EP. This was followed by their debut self-titled album in 2005 which received the same award, and a 2006 award for "best rock act." During this time the band performed as the opening act for Yellowcard on tour and also performed on the Warped Tour. In 2006 the band signed to major label Capitol, however they were soon dropped during the label's merger with Virgin. In March 2007 they released The Endless Bummer EP through Apple Danish Records. That December they self-released their second album Touchtone Inferno!!!, recorded under their contract with Capitol.

In February 2009 O'Donnell announced his involvement in a new musical project called Big If with Ryan Key of Yellowcard. This effectively put Reeve Oliver on hiatus, with Key stating that "Neither Yellowcard or Reeve Oliver feel like it is necessary to announce official break ups. There may come a time down the road where we want to get together and play shows with those bands. Who knows when that may be, but we aren't ruling it out completely." O'Donnell went on to serve as the bassist for Yellowcard from April 2010 until February 2012.

== Band members ==
=== Current members ===
- Sean O'Donnell – vocals, guitar
- Brad Davis – drums, backing vocals

=== Former members ===
- O (Otis Barthoulameu) – bass, backing vocals (died 2023)
- Jason Harper – guitar
- Brandon Young – drums

== Discography ==
=== Albums ===
Year	Title	Label
2004	Reeve Oliver	The Militia Group
2007	Touchtone Inferno!!!	Summertone/Apple Danish

=== EPs ===
Year	Title	Label
2001	Yer Gonna Win	
2002	The California EP	
2003	The Reeveolution EP	Redsand Clothing
2004	The Baldachu EP	
2005	Takeover Records 3-Way Issue#2	Takeover
2007	The Endless Bummer EP	Apple Danish

=== Non-album tracks ===
Year	Title	Label	Song(s)
			"Santa Has Got Reindeer on His Mind"

== Videography ==
=== Music videos ===
Year	Title	Album
2004	"I Want Burns"	Reeve Oliver
