= Carousel (Blink-182 song) =

1994 song by Blink-182

Song by Blink-182

from the album Cheshire Cat
- Released: January 1994 (Buddha); February 17, 1995 (Cheshire Cat)
- Recorded: January 1994
- Studio: Westbeach Recorders, Los Angeles, California
- Genre: Skate punk; pop punk
- Length: 3:15
- Label: Cargo Music/Grilled Cheese
- Songwriters: Tom DeLonge; Mark Hoppus
- Producer: O

"Carousel" is a song by American rock band Blink-182, originally released on the demo album Buddha (1994) before being re-recorded for the group's debut studio album, Cheshire Cat (1995). Written by bassist Mark Hoppus, guitarist Tom DeLonge, and drummer Scott Raynor, it was the first song composed by Hoppus and DeLonge after meeting in August 1992. Musically, "Carousel" combines a distinctive melodic bass line and jangling guitar passages before accelerating into a fast-paced skate-punk arrangement. Its lyrics explore themes of adolescent isolation, loneliness, uncertainty, and the transition into adulthood.

Although never released as a single, "Carousel" has remained a staple of Blink-182's live performances and is widely regarded as one of the band's signature early songs and an enduring fan favorite. Both Hoppus and DeLonge have cited it as the product of their immediate musical chemistry. "Carousel" was later included as the only non-single on the band's Greatest Hits.

== Background ==
The origins of "Carousel" lie in the first jam session between guitarist Tom DeLonge and bassist Mark Hoppus in August 1992. Shortly after moving from Ridgecrest, California to San Diego to attend college, Hoppus met DeLonge through his sister Anne and her boyfriend, Kerry Key. Their first meeting took place in the garage of DeLonge's family home, which served as his practice space. The pair immediately bonded over a shared interest in punk rock bands such as the Descendents and Bad Religion, spending their first evening together discussing music before beginning to play. Afterwards, the two practiced the songs DeLonge had written (collected in a red notebook) and Hoppus' compositions for several hours.

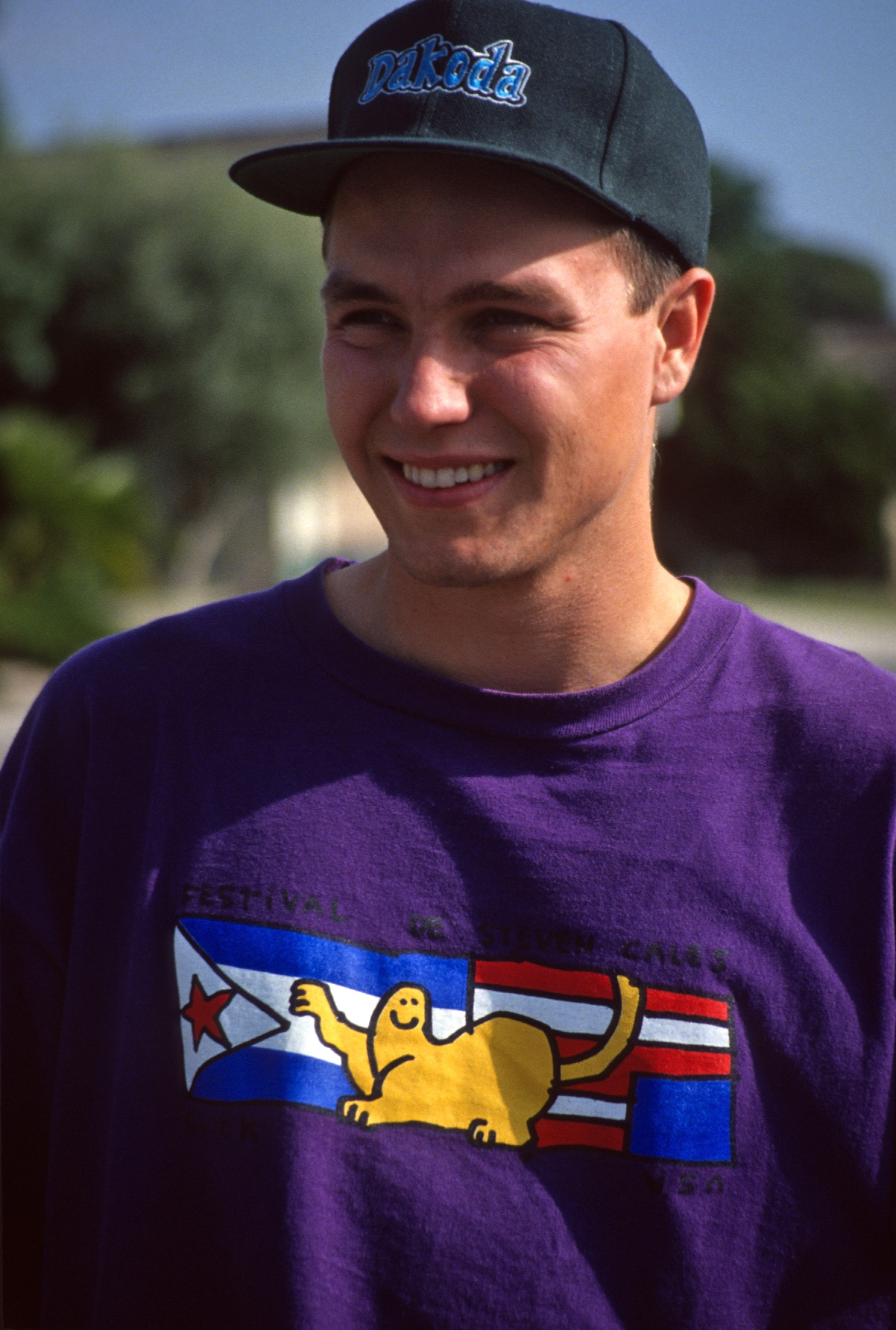
Mark Hoppus in May 1994.

The development of "Carousel" came quickly. Hoppus introduced a bassline he had written after unsuccessfully attempting to learn Ludwig van Beethoven's "Für Elise", while DeLonge paired it with a fast guitar riff from one of his own compositions. The two quickly developed the idea into a complete song, which became "Carousel", featuring DeLonge on lead vocals with Hoppus providing harmony vocals. "Instantly, I felt like we had the same musical style; he just had it on a different instrument than me," DeLonge said. Hoppus later recalled that the song's interlocking bass and guitar parts convinced both musicians they had found a compatible songwriting partnership, and by the end of the evening they had resolved to continue writing together as the nucleus of a new band. DeLonge felt being especially proud of the song's extended introductory build, describing it as "a big deal" for a self-taught guitarist who had never taken formal lessons.

Shortly afterward, the pair recruited drummer Scott Raynor, a 14-year-old whom DeLonge had previously played with. Although Raynor's musical background was rooted in heavy metal, he readily adapted to the trio's faster punk style. The three began rehearsing regularly in Raynor's bedroom, where they expanded their repertoire of original songs, including "Carousel", whose driving rhythm was shaped in part by Raynor's energetic double-bass drumming. The song was first recorded for the band's third demo, which came to be known as Buddha, released in January 1994 and distributed via cassette. The song was recorded once more, in a slightly different arrangement, on the band's debut, Cheshire Cat, issued in February 1995.

== Composition ==
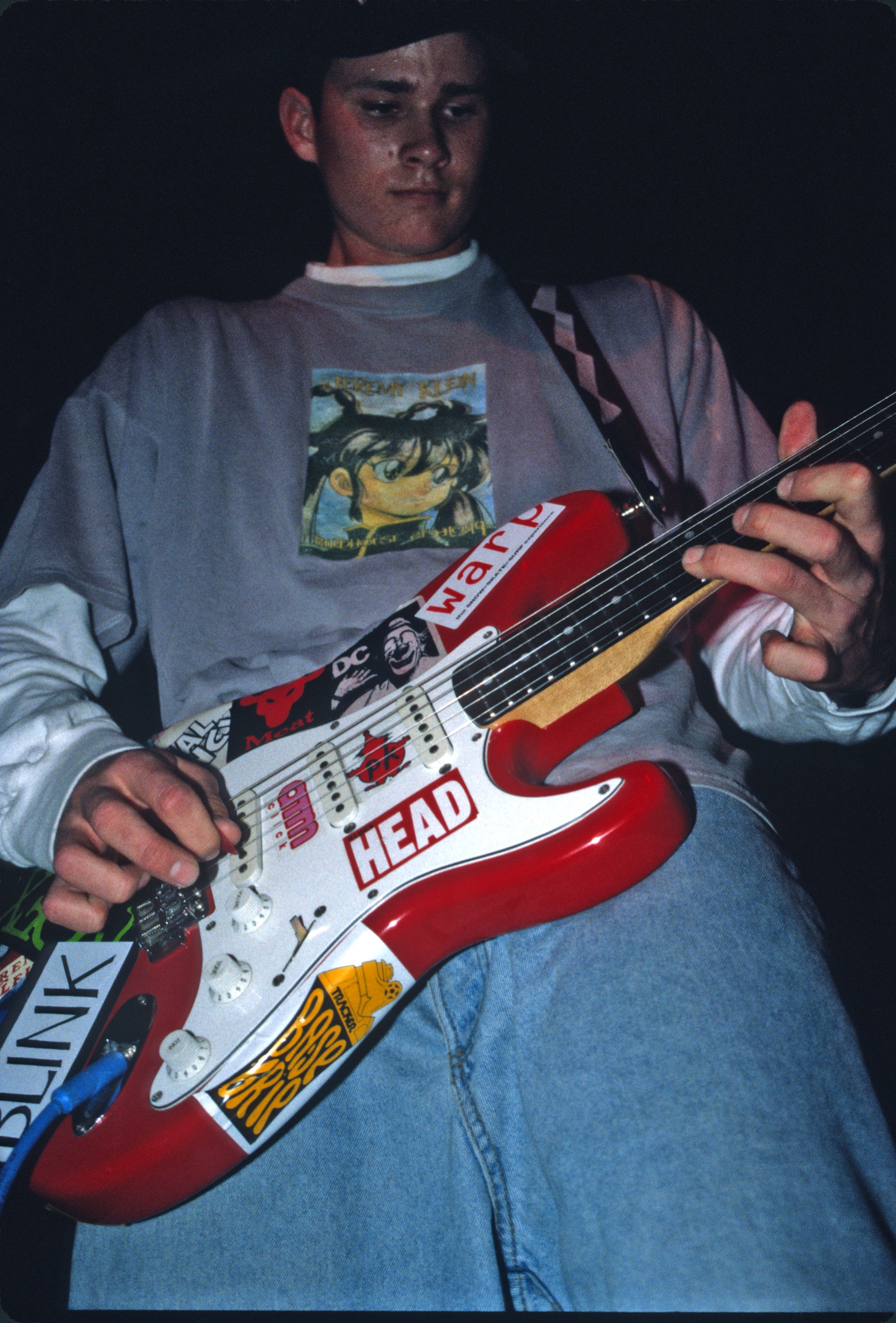
Tom DeLonge performing at an early Blink-182 show.

The song is composed in the key of D major and is set in common time. DeLonge's vocal range spans from A_{3} to G_{4}. The song "begins with a mid-paced riff and some nice undistorted jangling guitars before smashing into a satisfyingly fast-assed punk song in the vein of NOFX with some very adept dynamic breakdowns." "Carousel" opens with a melodic, arpeggiated, melodic bass line before gradually building into a fast-paced pop-punk arrangement driven by rapid-fire vocals. In a retrospective review, Sam Law of Kerrang! wrote that the song's extended introduction creates a gradual sense of momentum before "taking off" into Blink-182's characteristic high tempo. Hoppus cited Ned's Atomic Dustbin as a major influence on his bass playing, and noted that the opening bassline for "Carousel" was inspired by their song "Happy", which similarly uses the upper bass strings.

The song's lyrics explore adolescent isolation and existential uncertainty. Alternative Press interpreted the song's lyrics as expressing adolescent longing and dissatisfaction, arguing that DeLonge's reflections on school life and the search for fulfillment resonated across multiple generations of listeners. Lyrically, "Carousel" reflects on the uncertainty and isolation that follows adolescence, with the narrator mourning the loss of the friendships and sense of purpose associated with school after graduation. In a retrospective review, Stereogum interpreted the song as exploring the disorientation of entering adulthood, arguing that its repeated references to loneliness and fading communication convey the emotional vacuum left after leaving the familiar routines of youth. Consequence viewed "Carousel" as depicting adolescent heartbreak with exaggerated emotional stakes, arguing that its references to financial ruin and despair reflect the intensity with which teenagers experience romantic loss.

== Reception ==
The song has been widely called a fan favorite. Consequence, in a 2015 top 10 of the band's best songs, ranked it as number five, with Dan Caffrey commenting: "The song may very well have perfected the '90s pop-punk formula: unlike the audience, four-chord sugar and the caffeinated heartbeat of Scott Raynor's drum fills never age." Pranav Trewn at Stereogum ranked it at number six among the band's ten best tunes, and characterized "Carousel" as one of Blink-182's earliest and most emotionally resonant songs: "As the first song from the very first Blink LP, "Carousel" comes off as a statement of intent."

In 2013, DeLonge said he remained deeply connected to "Carousel", though he viewed it with mixed feelings, expressing regret over its lyrics while recalling that its speed and intensity had felt distinctive within early pop-punk. He also reflected on the song's enduring popularity, describing it as surreal that one of Blink-182's earliest compositions continued to be a concert staple decades after it was written.

The song has been covered by No Pressure.
