= M+M's =

Single by Blink-182

from the album Cheshire Cat
- Released: 1995
- Recorded: 1994
- Studio: Westbeach Recorders, Los Angeles, California
- Genre: Skate punk
- Length: 2:35
- Label: Cargo Music; Grilled Cheese
- Songwriters: Mark Hoppus; Scott Raynor; Tom DeLonge
- Producer: O

Blink-182 singles chronology
"M+M's" (1995)	"Wasting Time" (1996)

"M+M's" (read as "M and M's") is the debut single by American rock band Blink-182, released from the group's debut studio album, Cheshire Cat (1995), on 1995. The song was written by guitarist Tom DeLonge, bassist Mark Hoppus and drummer Scott Raynor, and produced by O. The song exemplifies the band's early Southern California skate-punk sound, built around power chords, rapid tempos, and Hoppus' melodic lead vocal. Its lyrics describe a longing to escape everyday life through fantasies of travel and adventure.

Following blink-182's signing to Cargo Music, "M+M's" was selected as the album's lead single. The song became a local hit in San Diego, helping expand the band's audience among the region's punk scene. The accompanying music video, directed by Darren Doane, depicts the trio stealing items from their girlfriends, who confront them later in a gunfight. It received limited overall exposure, but found an audience through skateboarding and surfing videos. "M+M's" was later included on the band's Greatest Hits.

== Background ==
"M+M's" originated from rehearsals in DeLonge's garage in the summer of 1994, when the band was preparing to record their debut album. The track was recorded at the famous Westbeach Recorders in Los Angeles shortly after the band secured their label deal with Cargo Music. "M+M's" is based around power chords and Hoppus' lead vocal of a vacation elsewhere. Journalist Joe Shooman described it as "Blink in microcosm," commenting that, "in less than three minutes they nail their sonic colors to the mast."

After Cheshire Cat was completed, producer O contacted his friend Mike Halloran of XETRA-FM (branded on-air as 91X), who was a fan of the band, to determine the album's lead single. "We went over the songs to figure out if there was a track that would stand up to the huge bands of the day: Nirvana, Pearl Jam, Soundgarden, etc.," Halloran wrote in 2000. Between "M+M's" and "Wasting Time", the former won, and began to receive regular rotation. DeLonge first heard the song in his car and rolled down his windows, yelling at passersby to "turn their damn radios on," while Hoppus later likened it to a scene from the film That Thing You Do!. Within two weeks, it was the #1 most requested track on the station, which made Halloran question whether its success was just Blink fans jamming request lines. The radio success of "M+M's" helped bolster their profile locally within San Diego, as evidenced by larger crowds following the airplay. "We sat back and watched as those old shows at SOMA went from the half club to the full club… jam packed with people of all ages," wrote Halloran.

== Composition ==
"M+M's"
A sound sample of "M+M's".

The song is composed in the key of E major and is set in time signature of common time with a tempo of 168 beats per minute. Hoppus' vocal range spans from D#_{3} to C#_{4}. "M+M's" is based around power chords and Hoppus' lead vocal of a vacation elsewhere. The track exemplifies the band's southern California skate punk sound. Journalist Joe Shooman described it as "Blink in microcosm," commenting that, "in less than three minutes they nail their sonic colors to the mast."

== Music video ==
Cargo offered the band a small budget to film a music video, to be shot for under $10,000. Blink-182 selected filmmaker Darren Doane to direct the video after being introduced through mutual friends and becoming familiar with his work on videos for Pennywise and Ten Foot Pole. The band and Doane held a planning meeting at a fast-food restaurant in Huntington Beach, California, where blink-182 gave the director just two creative requirements. "Their only criteria was to have guns and girls," Doane later recalled. "They said, 'We'll do whatever we have to do as long as we can have really pretty girls and shoot guns.'"

In the clip, the trio wake up in the morning beside their girlfriends (played by hired models) and proceed to steal an item from them. They are confronted before a concert later by their significant others, and a gunfight ensues. The band's original vision was a bit different: "I wanted the M+M's video to be fifty guys lined up, and have us shooting at their nuts," said DeLonge in 2001. "Just a whole video of slo-mo close-ups of these guys' nuts exploding." The video was shot at Belmont Park and at SOMA, an all-ages punk and hardcore venue the band often headlined. Ken Daurio co-directed the clip.

Filming a video made the band gain confidence, although they had no plans to market the video. However, the band's new manager, Rick DeVoe, had connections that led to the track being used in various skateboarding, surfing, and snowboarding videos. "M+M's" made its first appearance on Good Times, a surfing video directed by DeVoe's friend Taylor Steele. An employee of Cargo Music presented the video to MTV, but network executives "threw the tape out at first sight of the girls with guns," remarking, "Why are you showing us this shit?"
