= Reeve Oliver (album) =

Studio album by Reeve Oliver
- Released: 2004
- Recorded: 2004
- Genre: Pop rock
- Label: The Militia Group
- Producer: Sean O'Donnell

Reeve Oliver chronology
| Reeve Oliver (2004) | Touchtone Inferno!!! (2007) |

Reeve Oliver is the debut album by the San Diego, California pop rock band Reeve Oliver, released in 2004 by The Militia Group. It was awarded "best rock album" at the 2005 San Diego Music Awards. A music video was filmed for the lead single "I Want Burns" and the band toured with Yellowcard and played on the Warped Tour in support of the album.

== Track listing ==
All songs written by Sean O'Donnell

1. "I Want Burns"
2. "I Don't Want to Know!"
3. "Young and Dumb"
4. "Your Own Private Ice Age"
5. "On the Floor"
6. "Yer Motion"
7. "Until Someone Loves You"
8. "Inhale, Exhale"
9. "Reevenge"
10. "An Offer She Can't Refuse"
11. "Sizzle Digitz"

== Personnel ==
- Sean O'Donnell - vocals, guitar, piano
- Otisserie Bartimus (Otis Bartholameu) - bass
- Brad Davis - drums, congas
- Jeff Livingston - organ and piano on "Young and Dumb"
- Lenny Beh - violin on "An Offer She Can't Refuse"

== Album information ==
- Record label: The Militia Group
- All songs written by Sean O'Donnell
- Produced and engineered by Sean O'Donnell at Golden Track Studios in Escondido, California with additional production by O.
- Mixed by Mark Trombino at Extasy Studios in south Los Angeles, California with assistance by Justin Smith
- Mastered by John Golden at John Golden Mastering
- Design by O and Earl Grey Design
- Photography by Peter King
