= Touchtone Inferno =

Reeve Oliver

Studio album by Reeve Oliver
- Released: December 1, 2007
- Genre: Pop rock
- Label: Summertone/Apple Danish
- Producer: Neal Avron, Sean O'Donnell

Reeve Oliver chronology
Reeve Oliver (2004)	Reeve Oliver (2007)

Professional ratings
Review scores
Source	Rating
AbsolutePunk.net	66%

Touchtone Inferno!!! is the second album by the San Diego, California pop rock band Reeve Oliver, released in 2007 by Summertone Records and Apple Danish Records. The majority of the album was recorded while the band was under contract to Capitol Records, before they were dropped during the label's merger with Virgin Records. As a result, the band self-released the album through their own label Apple Danish. The album was initially released through iTunes, while a CD version is available at the band's performances and is planned to be available in certain San Diego-area record stores.

Several of the album's songs are drawn from earlier releases. "Yer Motion" and "I Want Burns" are re-recordings of songs from the band's 2004 debut album. "Madachu" is a re-recorded song from the 2004 Baldachu EP, while "Endless Bummer" originally appeared on The Endless Bummer EP earlier in 2007.

The iTunes version of the album includes the bonus track "Yer Time," which is a b-side from the album's recording sessions and includes drummer Brad Davis' brother Matt playing accordion. Singer/guitarist Sean O'Donnell also announced two other b-sides, both of which are re-cordings of songs from previous releases: "Young and Dumb" originally appeared on the band's 2004 debut album, while "I Can See the World From Here" originally appeared on The Endless Bummer EP in March 2007.

The album's cover model is actress Kaylee DeFer, best known for her role on the television sitcom The War at Home.

== Track listing ==
All songs written by Sean O'Donnell

1. "Yer Motion"
2. "I Want Burns"
3. "Reason to Leave"
4. "Cheat Me Slowly"
5. "Sunshine"
6. "Clean Up Mission Hills"
7. "Goldiloches"
8. "Open Face Darrell"
9. "Endless Bummer"
10. "Wings"
11. "Madachu"
12. "The Leg"
13. "Yer Time" (iTunes release only)

== Performers ==
- Sean O'Donnell - vocals, guitar, piano
- O (Otis Bartholameu) - bass
- Brad Davis - drums
- Sean Mackin - violin on "Madachu"
- Matt Davis - accordion on "Yer Time"
