= Buddha (album) =

1994 demo album by Blink-182

Demo album by Blink
- Released: January 1994 (original); October 27, 1998 (re-issue)
- Recorded: January 1994
- Studios: Doubletime, Santee, California
- Genre: Skate punk
- Length: 35:41; 31:55 (re-issue)
- Labels: Filter (original); Kung Fu (re-issue)
- Producer: Pat Secor

Blink-182 chronology
Demo 2 (1993)	Buddha (1994)	Cheshire Cat (1995)

Reissue cover

Buddha is a demo album by the American rock band Blink-182. Recorded and released in January 1994 under the name Blink, it was the band's first recording to be sold and distributed. The band had recorded two previous demos—Flyswatter and 21 Days—using a four track recorder. Originally issued on cassette, Buddha was first self-distributed locally on consignment through independent record stores and at the band's concerts, helping blink establish a growing following in the San Diego area.

Recorded over a series of low-budget sessions at Doubletime Studios in Santee, California, the release captures the trio's early skate punk sound. On Buddha, bassist Mark Hoppus and guitarist Tom DeLonge alternate lead vocals over fast-paced, three-chord arrangements driven by drummer Scott Raynor. Its songs center on adolescence, relationships, boredom, and the band's characteristic irreverent humor. The sessions were financed by Pat Secor, a friend of the band, who released the cassette under the homemade imprint Filter Records.

Several songs on Buddha, most notably "Carousel", were later included on the band's debut album, Cheshire Cat, which followed in 1995. Although originally regarded by the band as its first album, Buddha has since been more commonly described as a demo because of its homemade production and limited initial release. Ownership of the recordings later became the subject of a legal dispute between the band and Secor. In 1996, the recordings were acquired by Kung Fu Records, which remixed and reissued Buddha for wide release in 1998.

== Background ==
Blink was formed in Poway, California, in August 1992 by guitarist Tom DeLonge, bassist Mark Hoppus, and drummer Scott Raynor. Hoppus, who had recently moved to San Diego, was introduced to DeLonge by his sister Anne and the pair immediately bonded over a shared love of punk rock, spending hours writing songs together in DeLonge's garage. Raynor, whom DeLonge had met at a local Battle of the Bands competition, completed the trio. The band's early material combined the melodic Southern California skate-punk of groups such as the Descendents and Bad Religion with dual lead vocals, juvenile humor, and fast-paced three-chord songs. The trio briefly performed under names including Duck Tape and Figure 8 before settling on Blink.

After recording the homemade cassette Flyswatter in drummer Scott Raynor's bedroom in 1993, blink began building a following through performances at local high schools, clubs, and all-ages venues throughout San Diego. The band's first performance was at a local high school during lunch, and soon the trio graduated to San Diego's Spirit Club and influential local shop Alley Kat Records. DeLonge called clubs constantly in San Diego asking for a spot to play, as well as calling up local high schools convincing them that Blink was a "motivational band with a strong anti-drug message" in hopes to play at an assembly or lunch. The band soon became part of a circuit that also included the likes of Ten Foot Pole and Unwritten Law, and they found their way onto the bill as the opening band for local acts at SOMA, a local all-ages venue which they longed to headline.

== Recording and production ==
Following the release of Flyswatter in 1993, blink began seeking a more professionally recorded release. Hoppus distributed a small number of copies of Flyswatter to friends, including Pat Secor, his manager at the record store Wherehouse Music in San Diego. The two had met when Secor transferred from a north San Diego location, and became friends quickly, despite Secor's seniority of post. Secor, who was active in the local punk scene and hoped to establish an independent record label, loaned the band US$1,000 to finance a professional recording session. "He was like, hey, I'll front you the money, and we'll split the profits until you pay me back," recalled Hoppus in 2001. Secor used money from his savings to back the band.

The recording sessions at Doubletime Studios in Santee, California took place in January 1994, and were scheduled around work and school commitments. Because guitarist Tom DeLonge worked full time for a construction company and drummer Scott Raynor was still attending high school, the sessions were divided across three evenings. The recordings were engineered by Jeff Forrest. During the sessions, the trio recorded thirteen songs along with two novelty tracks, with most performances captured live in one or two takes. Hoppus, who was sick during the sessions, later described the recordings as "rushed and sloppy", recalling that the band's primary goal was simply to "play loud and fast and have fun."

Hoppus and DeLonge took the songwriting for their first legitimate release very seriously. The two strove for perfection writing songs that they felt would be relatable. The band's main influence was the Descendents. "I was trying to emulate that band. Really punchy guitars, fast, simple and formulaic nursery rhyme love songs," DeLonge later said. Blink also recorded several novelty tracks, believing that making listeners laugh was nearly as important as the serious material. DeLonge later recalled that the band devoted more time to perfecting the joke songs than the rest of the album. The trio also incorporated applause and laughter from a sound effects tape they discovered at the studio, simply because they found it amusing.

Altogether, the band completed the demo in a matter of days. Forrest later recalled that Buddha was "cut live then we added the vocals. Two days and they were done—including the mix. It's quite standard for a young punk band to do that." However, contemporary and later sources differ on the precise timeline: the original cassette's liner notes state that the demo was recorded in twelve hours, while the remastered edition describes the sessions as taking place "over three rainy nights."

== Packaging and release ==
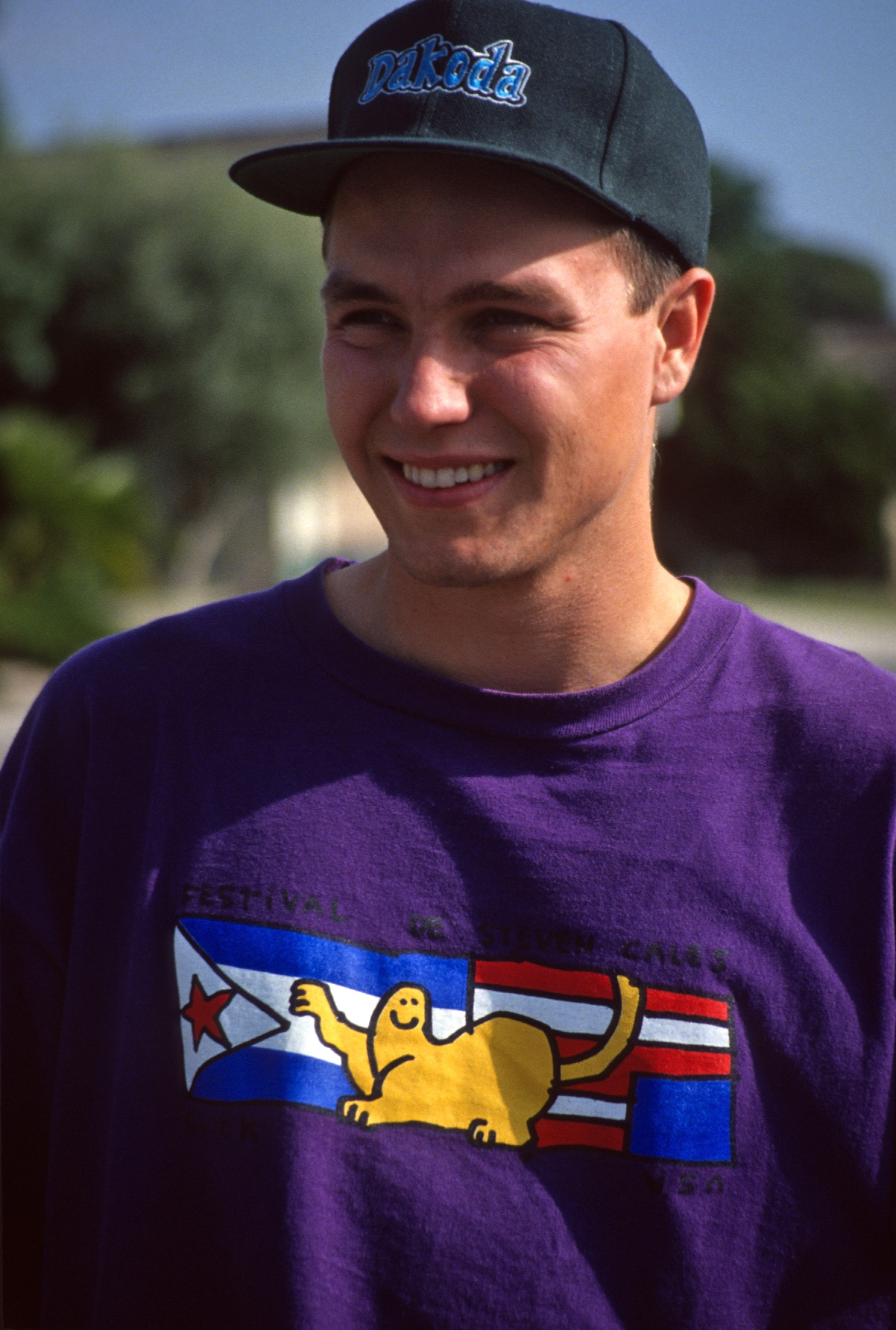
Mark Hoppus in May 1994, shortly after Buddha was recorded.

After the recording sessions concluded, the band commissioned friend Cam Jones to photograph them in Raynor's backyard for the cassette artwork. Jones also photographed a small Buddha statue that Hoppus had received as a gift from his stepfather, Glenn, after a military deployment to Japan. The cover depicts a statue of Budai, a figure commonly mistaken in the West for the Buddha, inspiring the demo's title. The image was selected for the cover, and the cassette became informally known as Buddha. The band deliberately omitted a separate title from the packaging, fearing listeners might confuse the album title with the band's name. Hoppus later remarked that the handmade presentation reflected the realities of independent punk releases at the time: "DIY wasn't an aesthetic; it was a necessity."

Kerry Key, drummer for the Iconoclasts and friend of the band, also is credited with artwork in the original cassette. The artwork was reproduced using color photocopies at Kinko's, which Hoppus recalled was considered a luxury for independent bands in the early 1990s. Afterwards, they cut, pasted and rearranged the photos until they found something suitable. The lyric sheets were handwritten. The master tape was sent to a local cassette duplication company, which produced several dozen copies, including professionally screened cassette labels listing the song titles. Hoppus and members of his family assembled the finished cassettes by hand, folding inserts and packaging them while watching television together.

Buddha was released in 1994 under Filter Records, a makeshift independent imprint Secor created to give the self-released cassette a record label. The band distributed Buddha independently through local record stores across San Diego County on a consignment basis, typically leaving five copies at a time in shops. Initially, sales were modest, but demand steadily increased as blink developed a following through performances at SOMA and other local venues. Cassette copies of Buddha were also sold at early Blink concerts, alongside homemade T-shirts. Hoppus later recalled his surprise as stores repeatedly requested additional copies, realizing that strangers—not simply friends and relatives—were purchasing the demo. The growing sales reflected the band's expanding reputation within the San Diego punk scene and helped establish an audience prior to their debut studio album, Cheshire Cat (1995).

"I totally remember driving around to all the record stores to drop off tapes to sell. I'd go to Lou's Records, and Off the Record, and Music Trader. It was so cool because the tapes were actually selling, that's why I had to keep going back every week. Music Trader would have sold one copy, Off the Record sold two, or whatever. But that meant people were actually walking into a music store and buying something we had written and recorded. It was awesome."

— Mark Hoppus

== Re-release ==
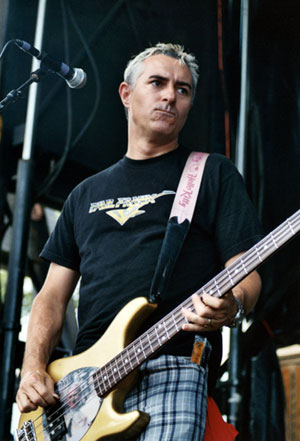
Joe Escalante of the Vandals re-released Buddha through his label, Kung Fu Records.

The ownership of Buddha and its master recordings became the subject of a dispute between the band and Pat Secor several years after the cassette's original release. According to Secor, he and the band had a verbal agreement under which he would finance the recording and manufacture of the cassette in exchange for half of its profits and ownership of the master tapes. Drummer Scott Raynor, however, recalled that the understanding was that Secor's US$1,000 investment would be repaid through sales, after which ownership would revert to the band.

Secor reportedly used his industry connections to help blink sign with Cargo Music in 1994, hoping the band's success would also establish his homemade imprint, Filter Records. As blink's popularity increased, however, the two sides disagreed over the rights to Buddha. Secor later claimed he received legal threats from Cargo Music and, after blink signed with MCA Records in 1996, from the major label as well, but lacked the resources to challenge them in court.

Believing Secor was continuing to sell copies of Buddha without accounting for royalties, blink enlisted attorney Joe Escalante of the Vandals, who also owned Kung Fu Records. Escalante anonymously purchased a cassette from Secor to confirm the sales, after which the band authorized Kung Fu to reissue Buddha on compact disc in lieu of legal fees. Secor maintained that the remaining cassettes were part of his original inventory and that the band had already received its share of the proceeds.

Kung Fu Records reissued Buddha on CD and cassette in November 1998 with remastered audio and a revised track listing, and has since released the recording on vinyl while retaining its digital distribution rights. "They'd already sold 60,000 copies of Cheshire Cat, said Escalante, "and I thought, 'Man, if I can sell just 10% of that that would be great for the label,' and of course it sold a lot more because they went on to be superstars." The reissue proved commercially successful; by 2001, it had reportedly sold more than 300,000 copies. Reflecting on the dispute, Secor said his primary frustration was not financial compensation but the lack of recognition for his role in financing and releasing the band's earliest recordings.

=== Reception ===
Reviewing the 1998 re-release of Buddha for AllMusic, critic Stephen Thomas Erlewine rated it three stars out of five, calling it a "promising debut" and "a solid skatepunk record that illustrates the group's flair for speedy, catchy hooks and irreverent humor." Rolling Stone viewed it, alongside proper debut album Cheshire Cat (1995) as "slapped together lilting melodies and racing beats in an attempt to connect emo and skate punk, a sort of pop hardcore." "This fast and furious beauty may have been recorded in two days, but it soon had the labels knocking at DeLonge and co's door," said Total Guitar in 2012.

== Classification ==
Whether Buddha constitutes blink's debut album or simply a demo has been the subject of differing interpretations. The band originally described the cassette as an album, but its homemade production, independent release, and subsequent replacement by Cheshire Cat have led many later sources—including Hoppus himself—to classify it as a demo. Reflecting the ambiguity, Hoppus remarked in 2019, "Some count Buddha, some not," when discussing the band's discography. In ranking the band's discography the next year, he left Buddha out of the ranking. In his memoir Fahrenheit-182 (2025), he consistently referred to the release as a demo.

== Track listing ==
All tracks are written by Mark Hoppus, Tom DeLonge, and Scott Raynor, except where noted.

Original version
No.	Title	Lead vocals	Length
1.	"Carousel"	DeLonge	2:54
2.	"T.V."	Hoppus	1:41
3.	"Strings"	Hoppus	2:25
4.	"Fentoozler"	Hoppus	2:06
5.	"Time"	Hoppus	2:49
6.	"Romeo & Rebecca"	DeLonge	2:34
7.	"21 Days"	DeLonge	4:03
8.	"Sometimes"	Hoppus	1:08
9.	"Degenerate"	DeLonge	2:28
10.	"Point of View"	DeLonge	1:11
11.	"My Pet Sally"	DeLonge	1:36
12.	"Reebok Commercial"	Hoppus	2:36
13.	"Toast & Bananas"	DeLonge	2:33
14.	"The Family Next Door" (Hoppus, DeLonge, Raynor, Brian Casper)	Hoppus/DeLonge	1:47
15.	"Transvestite"	Hoppus/DeLonge	3:59
Total length:			35:41

Remastered version
No.	Title	Lead vocals	Length
1.	"Carousel"	DeLonge	2:40
2.	"T.V."	Hoppus	1:37
3.	"Strings"	Hoppus	2:28
4.	"Fentoozler"	Hoppus	2:03
5.	"Time"	Hoppus	2:46
6.	"Romeo & Rebecca"	DeLonge	2:31
7.	"21 Days"	DeLonge	4:01
8.	"Sometimes"	Hoppus	1:04
9.	"Point of View"	DeLonge	1:11
10.	"My Pet Sally"	DeLonge	1:36
11.	"Reebok Commercial"	Hoppus	2:35
12.	"Toast & Bananas"	DeLonge	2:26
13.	"The Girl Next Door" (Ben Weasel)	Hoppus	2:31
14.	"Don't"	Hoppus	2:26
Total length:			31:55

== Personnel ==
Blink

- Mark Hoppus – vocals, bass
- Tom DeLonge – vocals, guitar
- Scott Raynor – drums

Production

- Pat Secor – production
- Jeff Forrest – mixing engineer

Design

- Kerry Key and Cam Jones – cover art
- Grace Walker – art direction (reissue)

== Charts ==
Chart performance for Buddha
Chart (1998)	Peak position
Australian Albums (ARIA)	78

== See also ==
- Cheshire Cat, the band's 1995 debut album on Cargo containing re-recordings of several tracks on Buddha

== Notes ==
- Hoppus, Anne (October 1, 2001). Blink-182: Tales from Beneath Your Mom. MTV Books / Pocket Books. ISBN 0-7434-2207-4.
- Shooman, Joe (June 24, 2010). Blink-182: The Bands, The Breakdown & The Return. Independent Music Press. ISBN 978-1-906191-10-8.
