= The Reeveolution =

The Reeveolution EP

EP by Reeve Oliver
- Released: 2003
- Recorded: 2003
- Genre: Pop rock
- Producer: Sean O'Donnell

Reeve Oliver chronology
The California EP (2002)	The Reeveolution EP (2003)	The Baldachu EP (2004)

The Reeveolution EP is an EP by the San Diego, California pop rock band Reeve Oliver, released in 2003 by Redsand Clothing. It was awarded "best rock album" at the 2003 San Diego Music Awards.

== Track listing ==
1. "I Want Burns"
2. "California"
3. "Young and Dumb"
4. "Yer Motion"
5. "Reevenge"
6. "The Great White North"

== Performers ==
- Sean O'Donnell - vocals, guitar
- O (Otis R.) - bass
- Brad Davis - drums
