= Waikiki (album) =

Studio album by Fluf
- Released: 1997
- Recorded: 1996
- Studio: Big Fish
- Genre: Punk rock
- Label: Way Cool Music/MCA
- Producer: Mark Trombino

Fluf chronology
The Classic Years (1995)	Waikiki (1997)	Road Rage (1998)

Waikiki is the fourth album by the American band Fluf, released in 1997. It was the band's first album with a major label. Fluf supported the album with a North American tour. The first single was "Got Everything".

== Production ==
Recorded at Big Fish Studios in Encinitas, California, the album was produced by Mark Trombino. The band spent 12 days recording Waikiki, the longest they'd spent on an album; they had to contend with the October 1996 San Diego brushfires.

"Of the Bo" is about the prevalence of homophobia in the punk rock and alternative rock scenes.

== Critical reception ==
Professional ratings
Review scores
Source	Rating
AllMusic	3/5 stars
Calgary Herald	4/5 stars
Fort Worth Star-Telegram	3.5/5 stars
Los Angeles Times	3/4 stars
North County Times	A−

The Austin Chronicle thought that, "ultimately, pure adrenal thunder is fluf's biggest attribute, but whether that's truly enough is questionable." The Calgary Herald called the band "a taut three-piece that simply rears back and delivers edgy, contemporary, no-frills, topical rock 'n' roll that manages to be angry and articulate at the same time." The North County Times said that "the band displays a mastery of the art of writing catchy, sing-along songs without losing rock 'n' roll intensity."

The Los Angeles Times concluded: "In his own gruff way, [singer] O may be the most openhearted guy in all of modern rock. His main subject, as always, is the close-in examination of relationships--romantic or comradely--in which the ties that bind are often unwinding." The San Diego Union-Tribune deemed the album "meaty, Husker Du-like guitar chords and tightly constructed melodies." The Fort Worth Star-Telegram determined that "throughout Waikiki, the threesome with a big sound but a warm heart stirs up all sorts of fun, sweet noise, with first-letter-only leader O's clever guitar playing and husky voice leading the way."

AllMusic wrote that "the lingering influence of Hüsker Dü can be clearly heard in such blasting yet warmly touching songs as 'Pushin' Back Days', while there's even a hint of the Cure's rushed guitar pop at points, especially in 'Class Action'."

== Track listing ==
No.	Title	Length
1.	"Skip Beat"
2.	"Got Everything"
3.	"Pushin' Back Days"
4.	"Bump"
5.	"The Chooser"
6.	"Of the Bo"
7.	"TV Anthem"
8.	"Sweet Dough"
9.	"Class Action"
10.	"Chocolate"
11.	"Pipe Bomb"
12.	"Batwing"
13.	"The Gift Of"
