= Dammit =

Single by Blink-182

from the album Dude Ranch
- Released: September 1997
- Recorded: December 1996–January 1997
- Studio: Big Fish Studios (Encinitas, California)
- Genre: Punk rock; skate punk; pop-punk
- Length: 2:45
- Label: MCA; Cargo
- Songwriters: Mark Hoppus; Tom DeLonge; Scott Raynor
- Producer: Mark Trombino

Blink-182 singles chronology
"Apple Shampoo" (1997)	"Dammit" (1997)	"Dick Lips" (1998)

Music video
- "Dammit" on YouTube

"Dammit" (sometimes subtitled "Growing Up") is a song by American rock band Blink-182, released in September 1997, as the second single from the group's second studio album, Dude Ranch (1997). Written by bassist Mark Hoppus, guitarist Tom DeLonge, and drummer Scott Raynor, the song examines frustration and vulnerability in adolescent breakups. Its simple four-chord guitar riff, brisk tempo, and direct, relatable lyrics exemplify the band's early skate punk style. It was produced by Mark Trombino.

Hoppus wrote "Dammit" in a burst of inspiration around a fictional breakup narrative, making it an exception among the band's early songs, which were often drawn from personal experience. Hoppus built the song around a familiar chord progression, but conceived its signature intro while experimenting on an acoustic guitar missing two strings. Its accompanying music video, directed by Ken Daurio and Darren Doane, increased the band's exposure, as did its inclusion in the 1998 film Can't Hardly Wait.

Upon its release, "Dammit" was a breakthrough for the band, becoming their first major hit, reaching number 11 on Billboard's Hot Modern Rock Tracks chart. It became a staple of modern-rock radio, gaining heavy airplay and boosting the band's profile internationally. Critics have frequently ranked "Dammit" among the band's best, praising its catchy riff, songwriting, and universal themes. The song has remained a staple of the band's live performances, traditionally serving as its concert closer. It is widely regarded as one of the defining pop-punk songs, and has been covered by a number of artists.

== Background ==
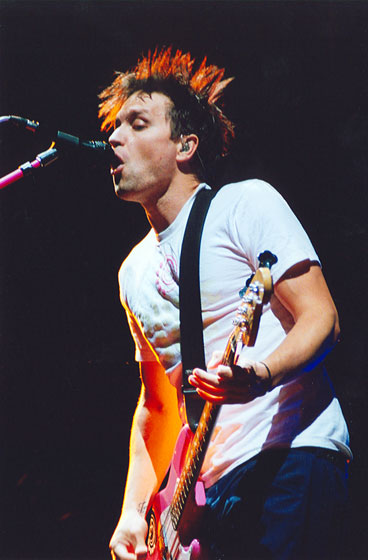
The song was composed by bassist Mark Hoppus

Blink-182 formed in San Diego, California, in 1992, with bassist Mark Hoppus, guitarist Tom DeLonge, and drummer Scott Raynor. After building a local following through frequent touring and independently released recordings, including the album Cheshire Cat (1995), the trio signed with major label MCA Records. Although the band had established itself within the Southern California punk scene, it had yet to achieve mainstream commercial success when recording its second studio album, Dude Ranch (1997).

Much of the material for Dude Ranch was written throughout 1996, and both DeLonge and Hoppus experienced a particularly prolific period while writing for the album. Hoppus conceived the signature guitar riff for "Dammit" while experimenting on an acoustic guitar that was missing two strings. The instrument's unusual configuration forced him to play around the absent strings, resulting in the distinctive riff that became the song's central hook. He wrote the song around a chord progression the band had used repeatedly, but the addition of a melodic guitar riff atop it marked a new approach.

Though many of the band's songs were inspired by specific relationships or personal experiences, "Dammit" was not autobiographical despite its breakup theme. Hoppus said the lyrics portray the awkward experience of encountering a former partner who has moved on with someone else, while trying to conceal feelings of heartbreak: "It really hurts when you aren't the person feeling the love, but you have to act like it's cool to save face," he said. While Hoppus occasionally described the song as personal, DeLonge maintained that it was fictional. Its development came quickly: "We put the whole thing together in just a few minutes. No second-guessing. No overthinking. It was one of those songs that just sort of happened," Hoppus recalled. He later attributed the song's success in part to its spontaneous creation, suggesting that its immediacy would have been lost had he labored over it for weeks.

The band began performing it live before recording Dude Ranch, where it quickly became a crowd favorite and was adopted as the closing song in their set. DeLonge considered the song a breakthrough in the band's songwriting: "It was the first time I clued in on a proper pop kind of arrangement – it's verse, verse, chorus, verse, chorus, bridge, chorus..." He found it unusual that a song that was not directly drawn from personal experience wound up connecting best with a wide audience. The song's title was inspired by an episode of Beavis and Butt-Head. In the segment, Beavis repeatedly exclaims "Dammit! Son of a bitch!" while criticizing a music video by the band Comateens, prompting him to joke that it would make a good song title.

== Recording and production ==
The song was recorded between December 1996 and January 1997 at Big Fish Studios in Encinitas, California. Producer Mark Trombino later recalled that "Dammit" stood out immediately during the Dude Ranch sessions. He added that repeated listens during recording never diminished its appeal, which gave him reason to view it as a strong single.

Recording the lead vocal proved challenging for Hoppus, who had written "Dammit" in a key just beyond his natural vocal range. Additionally, Trombino had encouraged Hoppus to deliver a more intense vocal performance than on the band's earlier recordings, later recalling that he pushed the singer "to the point of screaming" rather than relying on his characteristic talk-singing style. On the band's final day in the studio, Hoppus lost his voice after years of heavy cigarette smoking had strained his throat, delaying completion of the song until he returned several weeks later to finish the take. The demanding sessions left his voice noticeably hoarse, contributing to the raw, raspy vocal timbre heard on the finished recording. Hoppus later said he liked the performance, describing it as sounding "really raw and cool", but emphasized that it resulted from excessive vocal strain rather than any intentional technique. The experience prompted him to take greater care of his voice.

During recording, Trombino suggested adding a Hammond organ to the song's final chorus. Although the band initially found the idea hilarious—a corny organ contrasting with the heavy guitars—they were won over after hearing it incorporated into the final mix. Hoppus later recalled that the session marked the first time blink-182 realized their songs could be enhanced with instrumentation beyond the traditional trio of guitar, bass, and drums.

== Composition ==
"Dammit" carries a prominent opening guitar hook, dynamic verse-chorus structure, and climactic bridge. "Dammit" is set in the time signature of common time, with a fast tempo of 215 beats per minute. It is composed in the key of C major with Hoppus's vocals spanning the tonal nodes of C_{4} to G_{4}. The song follows a common chord progression sequence of I–V–vi–IV. Writing for Stereogum, Chris DeVille argued that the song's opening guitar riff had become one of rock's defining "beginner riffs", comparing its influence on aspiring guitarists to Nirvana's "Come as You Are" and Green Day's "Brain Stew." Nina Corcoran of Pitchfork observed that the song's opening guitar riff ascends the major scale in a deceptively simple fashion, arguing that its rudimentary construction is thematically fitting for a song about the challenges of growing up.

The lyrics depict the emotional aftermath of a breakup, following the narrator as he unexpectedly encounters a former girlfriend at a movie theater with her new partner. Through conversational language and specific details, Hoppus explores feelings of jealousy, frustration, and resignation before concluding with the refrain, "Well, I guess this is growing up," which broadens the song's relationship narrative into a reflection on the uncertainties of adulthood. Hoppus attributed the success of "Dammit" to its relatability, arguing that nearly everyone had experienced the uncertainty and heartbreak of a breakup reflected in the song's lyrics.

Chris Nelson of MTV News wrote that "Dammit"'s "staccato rhythm and melancholy pop-spirit" recalled both the Chicago punk band Screeching Weasel and the emotionally introspective style of the Descendents, which the band had cited as a formative influence.

== Commercial performance ==
On the Warped Tour in Australia […] Blink-182 walked out on stage and started playing to 10,000 people and this was when I realized they had made it. When Tom started the first notes to "Dammit," all 10,000 kids screamed and threw their hands in the air. I was sitting behind Tom's amps. I got goosebumps, and Tom turned to look at me and mouthed 'What the fuck?'

— Liza Bermingham, the band's assistant manager at the time

"Dammit" received heavy radio airplay at many key radio stations, and became the band's first hit single. MCA Records' retail plan for the single involved releasing it after the band's stint on the 1997 Vans Warped Tour in order to secure a story to help promote it to radio. The label first began to promote "Dammit" in August 1997 and several stations in Southern California were quick to begin playing the song, finding it to be a good match alongside Green Day and The Offspring radio hits. Stations such as KOME in San Jose were among the first to play the song. The song was released in September, and broke through to rock radio when it was added to the playlist of Los Angeles-based KROQ. Mainstream rock radio received "Dammit" in November, and MTV picked up the "Dammit" video, where it began receiving heavy rotation in December. This led to feature stories in magazines such as Billboard and Rolling Stone.

The song peaked at number 11 on Billboard's Hot Modern Rock Tracks chart, spending 28 weeks on the chart. It also spent nine weeks on the Mainstream Rock Tracks chart, peaking at number 26. Lastly, it charted on the airplay chart of the all-genre Billboard Hot 100, staying for nine weeks and hitting number 61. Billboard Airplay Monitor Report (BDS) figures reported that the record had received over 1,000 spins on KROQ, placing it as the second-most played track of 1998. It ranked third in terms of total airplay on Seattle's KNDD and New York's WXRK, attaining 900 plays on both respective stations. "Dammit" was among the top three most-played songs on San Francisco's KITS, Boston's WBCN, Detroit's CIMX and Sacramento's KWOD for the year. KEDJ of Phoenix played "Dammit" over 1,400 times over the course of the year. The song was called a modern rock "radio staple" by the Los Angeles Times. The song's success was largely responsible for pushing Dude Ranch to receive a gold certification from the Recording Industry Association of America for selling 500,000 copies. The song spent six weeks on RPM's Alternative 30 in Canada between April and May 1998, peaking at number 15. In addition, to its success in North America, the song peaked at number 34 on the ARIA Top 100 Singles Chart in Australia, where it spent sixteen weeks on the chart between December 1997 and April 1998.

== Critical reception ==
Carrie Bell of Billboard described it as a "jump-around pop punk song". Gavin Edwards at Rolling Stone called it a "rueful, up-tempo breakup song." Roger Catlin of the Hartford Courant praised "Dammit" for its "killer guitar hook" and its depiction of the emotional aftermath of a breakup. In a review for the Asbury Park Press, Ed Condran likened "Dammit" to the work of British alternative rock band Ned's Atomic Dustbin, arguing that its brisk tempo, frenetic vocals, and intricate bass work recalled that band's signature style. Chris DeVille of Stereogum praised Hoppus's songwriting, highlighting its evocative imagery, memorable one-liners, and the song's rudimentary yet "transcendent" opening guitar riff. Writing for MTV News, Maria Sherman observed that Hoppus' impassioned vocal performance gave "Dammit" a sing-along quality that contributed to the song's enduring popularity and lasting place in popular culture. Scott Heisel of Alternative Press called "Dammit" the "perfect punk song."

Several publications have ranked "Dammit" as the band's best song. Consequence named "Dammit" the greatest song in blink-182's catalog, with Dan Caffrey arguing that its adolescent themes and memorable opening riff gave it an enduring, global appeal: "The best songwriters don't capture what you're going through individually in your life – they capture the things that are common to all humanity, and there's something about "Dammit"'s chorus, something about its opening C, D, E riff that sounds universal." Stereogum similarly ranked it as the band's best, with Pranav Trewn praising its enduring portrayal of growing up as an ongoing process of uncertainty rather than a destination. Kerrang also pinned it as the band's best tune. Writer Sam Law credited it with establishing the band's signature sound and argued that its themes of growing older and moving on had become increasingly poignant with age for its listeners.

In 2022, Pitchfork ranked "Dammit" at number 216 on its list of the "250 Greatest Songs of the 1990s". Nina Corcoran praised its iconic opening guitar riff: "With 'Dammit', Blink-182 evolved from their juvenile skate-punk origins to a (slightly) more grown-up sound, worthy of the radio domination that would soon come." Writers for Complex also described the song as one of the 1990s' most iconic hits, with particular praise for its unmistakable opening riff, dual vocal interplay, and soaring chorus.

== Music video ==
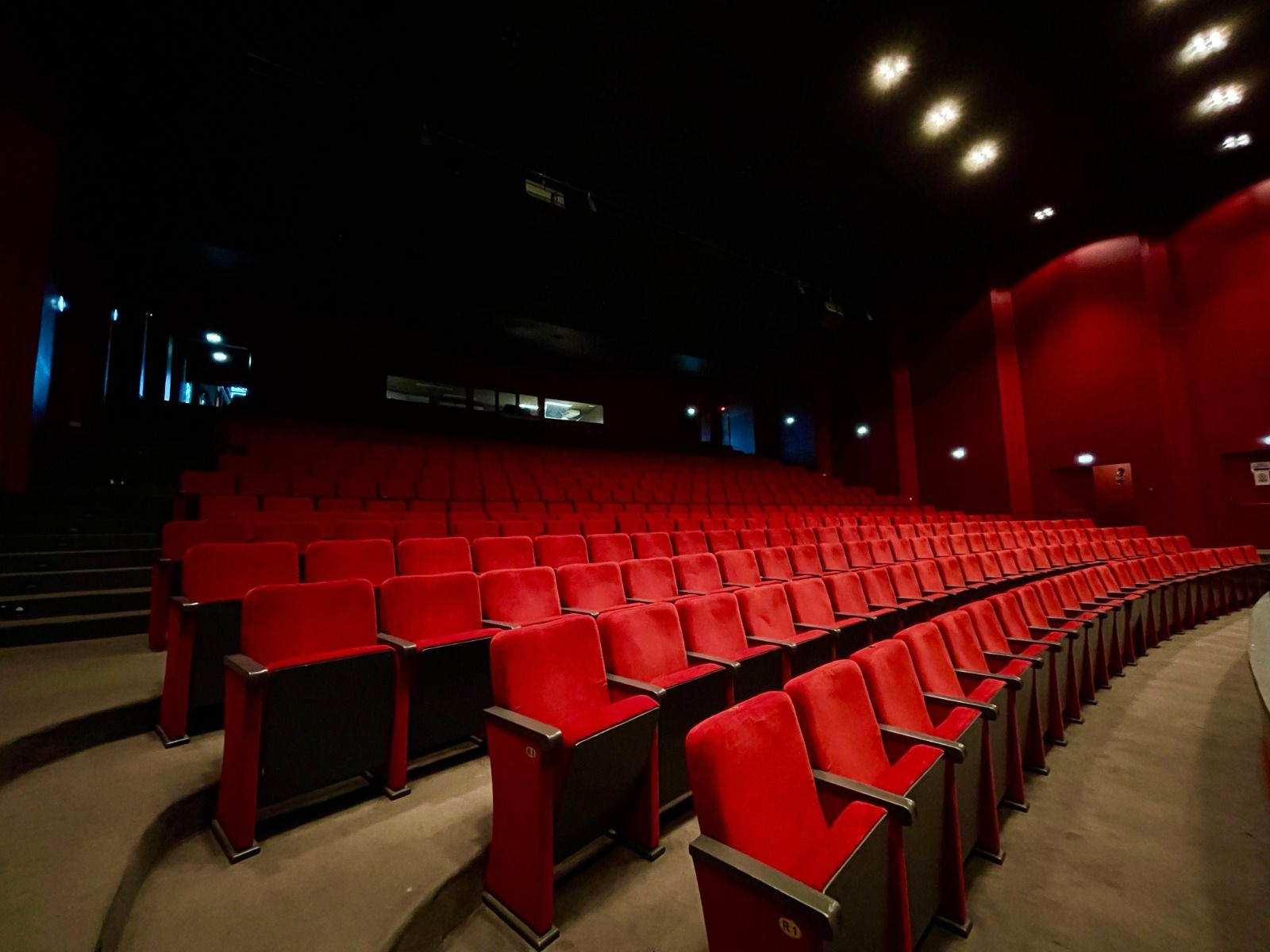
The video takes place in a movie theater.

The song's music video, co-directed by Ken Daurio and Darren Doane, loosely follows the song's narrative and is set in a cinema. It follows Hoppus after he encounters his former girlfriend on a date with another man. Interspersed with performance footage, the video adopts a comedic tone and culminates with a socially awkward concession stand employee, portrayed by the band's manager Rick DeVoe, winning the woman's affection instead. "Dammit" was filmed at the Lumiere Music Hall (formerly known as the Music Hall Theatre) located in Beverly Hills, California.

"Dammit" was blink-182's first professionally produced music video. The band had previously worked with Doane, who directed the video for "M+M's" in 1995. As MCA Records remained hesitant to invest heavily in the band, blink-182 developed the video's concept themselves. The production also marked the first time the group had worked with a dedicated film crew. Hoppus initially proposed appearing nude throughout the entire video, reasoning that because the song's protagonist had been left by his girlfriend, he was "naked" emotionally. He also thought the concept would simply be funny, but Doane persuaded him to abandon the idea. Instead, the production centered on filming overnight inside a movie theater. Doane later recalled that the opportunity to take over the theater after hours—with unlimited popcorn and soft drinks—was enough to win the band over, joking, "I think what blink really wanted to do was just get a lot of free popcorn."

Doane's collaborative approach and shared sense of humor allowed the video's concept to evolve during filming, as the band frequently improvised new gags on set. One spontaneous addition involved casting DeVoe as the snack attendant; amused by his comedic performance, the band expanded his role, with DeVoe becoming one of the video's central comic figures. Doane later praised the band's instinct for comedy, comparing them to actor Jim Carrey and saying they approached humor with unusual seriousness: "They have this mission to be as funny as an Airplane! movie or something." The video also includes visual gags, including a poster for the 1994 film Farinelli displayed behind the concession counter. Near the end of the bridge, during intercut performance footage of the group, DeLonge mouths to Hoppus a visible "I love you."

MTV premiered the music video for "Dammit" on 120 Minutes in July 1997 before adding it to regular rotation. Its increased exposure on the network, together with expanding radio airplay, helped propel the song to popularity. It was the band's first to attract heavy airplay on the network. It also became a frequent fixture on Streamland, an early online music video platform, where it regularly appeared among the service's weekly top 20 most-viewed videos.

In 2011, Hoppus auctioned off band memorabilia to help donate to victims of the Tōhoku earthquake and tsunami, one of which was his orange sweater he wore in the "Dammit" video.

== Live performances ==
"Dammit" quickly became a centerpiece of blink-182's live performances after its release, serving as the closing song in the band's setlist by the late 1990s. It has remained the group's traditional concert finale throughout much of its career, although it was briefly replaced by "One More Time" during portions of the band's 2024 tour. During live performances, DeLonge typically sings the song's chorus despite Hoppus performing the lead vocal on the studio recording. During DeLonge's absence from the band between 2015 and 2022, the chorus was instead performed by guitarist Matt Skiba.

During the instrumental bridge, Hoppus has frequently improvised by singing snippets of other songs, including TLC's "No Scrubs", Taylor Swift's "We Are Never Ever Getting Back Together", and Chappell Roan's "Pink Pony Club", among others.

== Reception and legacy ==
The success of "Dammit" significantly expanded blink-182's profile. Hoppus later recalled that, after the song entered heavy rotation on radio and MTV, the band members began to be recognized in public away from concerts, marking their transition from a regional punk act to a nationally known band. Its overall success stunned the group. DeLonge recalled: "[When 'Dammit' took off], we were freaking. We couldn't believe what was happening to us." Meanwhile, Hoppus, as a result of the single's success, began introducing himself to people as "that guy that wrote, 'duh nuh nuh nuh nuh duh nuh nuh nuh nuh, he fucked her.'" As "Dammit" gained mainstream radio airplay, Hoppus acknowledged the band's mixed feelings about pursuing broader exposure. He said radio play offered opportunities to reach a larger audience, but also carried the risk of the band being defined by a single successful song. Due to the influx of new fans, the band to add a "musical disclaimer" to live sets to remind audiences they had been active for years and had released material prior to the song's success.

Critics have identified "Dammit" as a landmark pop-punk recording whose success reshaped the genre, inspiring a wave of bands that sought to emulate its melodic songwriting and emotional candor. Trevor Kelley of Alternative Press credited Dude Ranch with helping define a style that balanced humor with emotional vulnerability, identifying "Dammit" as an influence on a new generation of bands: "Many of those acts, like Midtown and New Found Glory, spent the next few years trying to write their own version of 'Dammit'." Cameron Hurley of We Are the In Crowd is quoted saying: "For many, ["Dammit"] was the introduction to pop punk guitar playing. It's not the most advanced riff to play, but you just had to learn it." Tom Falcone of Cute Is What We Aim For cited Dude Ranch as a formative influence, describing "Dammit" as a song that captured the uncertainty of adolescence and inspired his band's early songwriting. The Wonder Years frontman Dan Campbell included "Dammit" among "The 10 Songs That Changed My Life", crediting it as one of his formative musical influences.

The song's opening guitar riff has been widely recognized as one of pop-punk's defining motifs, with Andy Greene of Rolling Stone describing it as "the sound of [listeners'] teenage years in guitar form." Critics have likened its intro to other iconic opening riffs in the pop-punk canon, such as Lit's "My Own Worst Enemy", The All-American Rejects' "Dirty Little Secret", and New Found Glory's "My Friends Over You".

== In popular culture ==
The song was featured in the 1998 teen film Can't Hardly Wait, during a scene in which the police break up a house party. These placements helped introduce the song to a broader audience beyond alternative radio. Chris DeVille of Stereogum argued that the song's inclusion on the Can't Hardly Wait soundtrack helped broaden punk's audience by introducing the genre to mainstream listeners, paving the way for a more poppy strain of the genre. The song was also featured in the television series Dawson's Creek.

In 2008, "Dammit" was included in the video game Guitar Hero: World Tour. Players could unlock Travis Barker (who joined the band after Dude Ranch) as a playable drummer after completing the song, for which Barker had also served as a consultant during the game's development.

"Dammit" has been widely covered by artists across the punk, indie rock, pop, and country genres, underscoring its broad influence beyond the pop-punk scene. Tom Breihan of Stereogum described "Dammit" as "a modern standard." Covers have ranged from emo and pop punk acts like All Time Low, Cloud Control, Lisa Prank, Good Charlotte, Of Mice & Men and Pierce the Veil, and new.wav. Indie acts like FIDLAR, Spirit Night, Colleen Green, and Best Coast have interpreted the song. Pop singers, like Amy Shark, and Hilary Duff have recorded renditions, while country musicians who have covered the song include Ruston Kelly and Alexandra Kay. Its impact even extended to hip-hop: rapper Lil Peep regularly used "Dammit" as his entrance music before taking the stage at concerts.

It was also covered in 2009 by the Decaydence All-Stars, an improvised trio composed of Fall Out Boy's Pete Wentz and Panic! at the Disco's Brendon Urie and Spencer Smith. In 2019, the blink-182 podcast Blink-155 released Been Here For Too Long, a tribute album consisting entirely of covers of "Dammit". The compilation featured reinterpretations by artists including Jenny Owen Youngs, Charlatan, Antarctigo Vespucci, and numerous other musicians, each offering a distinct stylistic take on the song.

== Track listings ==
US CD (1997)

1. "Dammit" (Tom Lord-Alge remix; radio edit) – 2:46
2. "Dammit" (Tom Lord-Alge remix) – 2:46

Australian CD (1997)

1. "Dammit" (Tom Lord-Alge remix; radio edit) – 2:46
2. "Dammit" (Tom Lord-Alge remix) – 2:46
3. "Zulu" – 2:07

== Credits and personnel ==
Credits adapted from the liner notes of Dude Ranch.

Locations

- Recorded at Big Fish Studios, Encinitas, California.
- Mixed at Track Record Studios, North Hollywood, California.

Blink-182

- Mark Hoppus – bass guitar, vocals
- Tom DeLonge – guitars
- Scott Raynor – drums

Production

- Mark Trombino – production, recording, mixing, keyboards
- Brian Gardner – mastering
- Tom Lord-Alge – remix

== Charts ==
=== Weekly charts ===
Weekly chart performance for "Dammit"
Chart (1997–1998)	Peak position
Australia (ARIA)	34
Canada Rock/Alternative (RPM)	15
US Hot 100 Airplay (Billboard)	61
US Mainstream Rock Tracks (Billboard)	26
US Modern Rock Tracks (Billboard)	11

=== Year-end charts ===
Year-end chart performance for "Dammit"
Chart (1998)	Position
US Modern Rock Tracks (Billboard)	27

== Certifications ==
Certifications and sales for "Dammit"
Region	Certification	Certified units/sales
New Zealand (RMNZ)	Platinum	30,000^{‡}
United Kingdom (BPI)	Silver	200,000^{‡}
^{‡} Sales+streaming figures based on certification alone.
