= Fluf =

Punk rock band

- Origin: San Diego, California, U.S.
- Genres: Punk rock, pop punk
- Years active: 1992–2000; 2013-present
- Labels: Headhunter; Honest Don's MCA / Universal
- Past members: O (Otis Barthoulameu); Jonny Donhowe; Miles Gillett; Josh Higgins; Brad Davis

Fluf (stylized as fluf) is an American punk rock band formed in San Diego, California, in 1992.

== History ==
O (Otis Barthoulameu - vocals, guitar) and Jonny Donhowe (bass guitar) formed the band after their previous band, Olivelawn, split up, recruiting drummer Miles Gillett. After several seven-inch singles (including a cover version of PJ Harvey's "Sheela Na Gig"), the band's debut album was released in 1993. Generally known as Mangravy, each physical format had a different title. A second album followed in 1994 (Home Improvements, also released on vinyl as Whitey on the Moon and on cassette as Stocking the Lake With Brown Trout), and in 1996 Donhowe left, to be replaced by Josh Higgins. This line-up recorded their major label (MCA) debut Waikiki (1997) and Road Rage (1998), with a final album-length EP, I Know I'm Nobody released in 2000.

Donhowe died in March 2020.

Barthoulameu died in February 2023.

== Discography ==
=== Albums ===
- Mangravy (LP) aka Compact Disc is Weak (CD)/Shooting Putty at the Moon (cassette)/Wasting Seed (10-inch LP) (1993), Headhunter
- Home Improvements (CD) aka Whitey on the Moon (LP)/Stocking the Lake With Brown Trout (cassette) (1994), Headhunter
- Waikiki (1997), Headhunter/MCA
- Road Rage (1998), Honest Don's

=== Compilation albums ===
- The Classic Years (1995), Headhunter
- Super Mixer; A Goldenrod Compilation (1996), Goldenrod

=== EPs ===
- Wasting Seed (1992), Headhunter Records hed 020
- Moody As The Day Is Young! (1994), Goldenrod
- I Know I'm Nobody (2000), Cold Steel Facts

=== Singles ===
- "Garbage Truck" (1992), Sympathy for the Record Industry
- "Sheela Na Gig" / "Song In D" (1993), Goldenrod
- Split single with Further "Lobster Tree" / "She Lives by the Castle 2" (1993) First Strike Records
- "24-7 Years" (1994), Silver Girl
- "Skyrocket" (1994), Headhunter
- "Tried" / "Clueless" (1994) Headhunter HED032
- Split single with J Church (1996), Goldenrod: "Assmunch"
