= SOMA San Diego =

Live music venue in San Diego, California

Coordinates: 32.754°N 117.209°W

- Interactive map of SOMA San Diego
- Address: 3350 Sports Arena Boulevard; San Diego, California; United States
- Capacity: 2,700 (mainstage) 500 (sidestage)
- Current use: Music venue

Construction
- Opened: 1990's
- Reopened: 1994, 2002

Website
- somasandiego.com

SOMA San Diego is a concert venue in the Midway neighborhood of San Diego, California, adjacent to Pechanga Arena. It has been described as San Diego's "leading all-ages venue for punk and alternative-rock concerts".

== History ==
SOMA was originally opened in the early 1990s by Len Paul at an old warehouse in downtown San Diego on 555 Union Street, just south of Market Street and was originally a slaughterhouse – hence the name “SOuth of MArket." At that time, the venue was mostly known as a dance club, but eventually made the transition to hosting live music. One unique feature of the club was that, in addition to the main concert hall located on the ground floor, it had a basement area, known as "The Dungeon" (which was the actual freezer room for the slaughterhouse) that held approximately 100 people. It was there that many local San Diego bands got their first opportunity to play at the club. If bands could bring in a large enough following, they would be given the opportunity to play upstairs on the main stage, in support of more popular local acts or nationally touring acts. At this downtown location some well-known San Diego bands such as Rocket from the Crypt, Blink-182, Unwritten Law, Stone Temple Pilots, and Buck-O-Nine built a strong local following before moving on to tour nationally in the mid-1990s.

In 1994, SOMA moved to a former warehouse at 5303 Metro Street, just south of the University of San Diego. Major artists such as Faith No More, Fugazi, Pavement, Radiohead, The Ramones, The Smashing Pumpkins, Marilyn Manson, Weezer and Oasis performed here, as well as many local bands. The venue closed in 1999.

In 2002, Paul reopened SOMA at its current home, a former multiplex movie theater that was renovated into a concert venue. Walls dividing individual theaters were torn down to create one large area for the main stage. It can hold up to 2,300 occupants in its main hall, and the side stage can accommodate 500+. Many of the theater's old production offices have been turned into dressing rooms for the bands which overlook the audience. There is a snack bar and merchandise area in the lobby.

On September 22, 2016, SOMA served beer in the side-stage room for a show by the band Descendents. This marked the first time in the venue's history that alcohol had been served. The first person to ever order a beer inside of SOMA was lead singer Mikey Carnevale of The Frights.

== Notable performances ==
In 2004, Switchfoot performed a sold-out show that was later released as a DVD titled Live in San Diego. Dave Matthews Band's performance at SOMA in 1995, broadcast live on radio, was later released as part of their Live Trax series.

On 16 June 2018, As I Lay Dying performed for the first time as a band since lead singer, Tim Lambesis was released from prison in late 2016. According to Tim, the concert was about gratitude for the opportunity to play as a band again and gratitude for fans.
