= Otis Barthoulameu =

American musician and record producer (1962/63–2023)

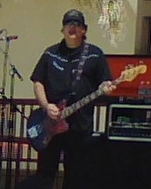
- Barthoulameu performing with Reeve Oliver in 2007

Background information
- Also known as: O; Otisserie Bartimus
- Born: 1962 or 1963 (Note: A June 1992 Los Angeles Times article states Barthoulameu's age at the time as 29, while a February 1994 Los Angeles Times article states his age at the time as 31, placing his birth between 1962 and early 1963.)
- Died: February 16, 2023 (aged 60)
- Genres: Punk rock; skate punk; pop-punk; pop rock; emo
- Occupations: Musician; record producer
- Instruments: Guitar; vocals; bass guitar
- Formerly of: Olivelawn; Fluf; Reeve Oliver

Otis "O" Barthoulameu (1962 or 1963 – February 16, 2023) was an American musician, photographer, record producer, and skateboarder. A prominent figure in Southern California's punk rock and skateboarding communities, he was best known as a member of Fluf, Olivelawn, and Reeve Oliver, his work as a photographer for Transworld Skateboarding, and his early support of blink-182, helping the band secure its first recording contract and producing its debut album, Cheshire Cat (1995).

Entirely self-taught, he performed with notable acts including Systems Officer, Makeup Sex, Woofer, Octagrape, and Harshmellow. Alongside his musical career, he worked extensively as a producer, tour manager, stage technician, and skateboard graphic designer. Known widely throughout the Southern California underground scene simply as "O," he was a prolific supporter of emerging talent and a constant fixture at local punk shows and skate sessions.

== Background ==
Known by the nickname "O" since his youth, Bartholameu grew up in Orange County, California, during the emergence of West Coast punk rock. He cited bands including Led Zeppelin, Black Sabbath, The Damned, and Black Flag among his earliest influences, later recalling that Black Flag inspired him to begin performing in bands because it made punk seem accessible. Entirely self-taught, he developed careers as a musician, record producer, photographer, and artist without formal training, describing his approach as learning "just by doing."

Before forming Fluf, Bartholameu worked as a roadie for local bands and became a familiar presence at underground concerts and skate sessions throughout Orange County and San Diego. In 1990, he co-founded the post-hardcore band Olivelawn. He later formed Fluf in 1992, whose debut album was released by Cargo Music the following year. Although Fluf attracted interest from major record labels during the early 1990s alternative rock boom, Bartholameu remained committed to artistic independence, all-ages performances, and working with independent labels, praising Cargo for its personal approach to artists.

Outside of music, he worked as an action photographer for Transworld Skateboarding, documenting Southern California's skateboarding and punk scenes. An early supporter of blink-182, he championed the band's earliest demo recordings, helped secure its first recording contract with Cargo Music, and produced Cheshire Cat (1995) as well as the EPs They Came to Conquer... Uranus and Lemmings. Bassist Mark Hoppus later credited Bartholameu as the band's first mentor, recalling that he "was the first person to believe in blink" and describing him as "the glue" of Southern California's underground punk and skateboarding communities.

Throughout his career, Bartholameu performed with numerous bands, including Makeup Sex, Systems Officer, Reeve Oliver, Octagrape, Woofer, and Harshmellow. Beyond performing, he worked as a producer, tour manager, stagehand, photographer, and graphic artist, serving as a roadie for the Muffs, a stagehand on Ministry's Psalm 69 tour, and later tour-managing acts including Dinosaur Jr. He also exhibited his paintings, designed skateboard graphics, and continued photographing musicians and skateboarders throughout his life.

Remaining active as both a musician and skateboarder into his sixties, Bartholameu formed Harshmellow in 2022 and continued touring nationally. He described skateboarding as a lifelong passion, remarking, "There's not a day that I wake up where I don't want to skateboard."
