= Ghost on the Dance Floor =

Song by Blink-182

from the album Neighborhoods
- Recorded: June 2010 – July 2011; Opra Music Studios, Henson Studios (Los Angeles, California); Neverpants Ranch (San Diego, California)
- Genre: Rock
- Length: 4:17
- Label: DGC; Interscope
- Songwriters: Tom DeLonge; Mark Hoppus; Travis Barker
- Producers: DeLonge; Hoppus; Barker

"Ghost on the Dance Floor" is a song by American rock band Blink-182 from the band's sixth studio album, Neighborhoods (2011). The song, written by guitarist Tom DeLonge, bassist Mark Hoppus and drummer Travis Barker, is a meditation on loss and the emotional weight of hearing a song associated with someone who has died. The atmospheric rock track balances a fast, driving tempo with shimmering, new wave–indebted guitar textures and dense, layered production.

The song was speculated to be inspired by the death of Barker's close friend and collaborator Adam Goldstein (DJ AM). Critical response to "Ghost on the Dance Floor" was largely positive, with reviewers highlighting it as a standout track on Neighborhoods. The song, although not a single, peaked at number 28 on Billboard's Rock Digital Songs chart in 2011.

== Background ==
"Ghost on the Dance Floor" is specifically about "hearing a song you shared with someone that's passed." DeLonge elaborated on the song in Kerrang!: "It's about being somewhere and hearing a song, which you shared with someone who has passed away, but you can feel them that night." The track resonated with drummer Travis Barker, who called DeLonge one night because the song affected him while listening to it, because of the death of his close friend and collaborator Adam Goldstein (DJ AM). For his part, DeLonge neither confirmed nor denied the song's lyrical basis, on whether it was inspired by the death of DJ AM, although the song has been played live with a tribute video to AM playing in the background.

He stated that his intentions in writing the song were to marry the notions of both beauty and angst with loss and heartache. "I think the point of a good song is that to different people, it strikes a chord for whatever reason, and I can only be responsible for half of it," said DeLonge. "I can put it out there, but other people have to hear it and have it do something. That's all I do it for – for that hope that it will do something."

== Music ==
The song is composed in the key of B major and is set in time signature of common time with a fast tempo of 207 beats per minute. DeLonge's vocal range spans from F#_{4} to E_{5}. Drowned in Sound pointed out that the melody of the song's verses are "near-identical" to that of Box Car Racer's "There Is", a song by DeLonge's 2002 side project.

The song has been described as "airy, uptempo rock," and Spin considered the song as reminiscent of new wave.

== Reception ==
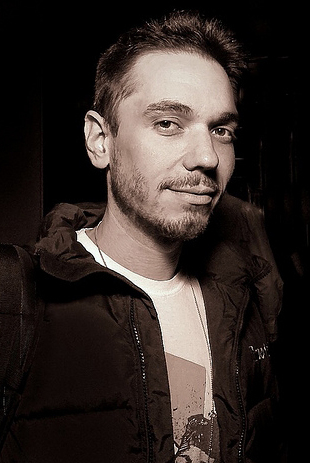
The song was speculated to be about drummer Travis Barker's friend DJ AM, who died in 2009.

The song was one of the first the band performed from Neighborhoods, alongside "After Midnight", "Heart's All Gone" and "Up All Night", and was debuted on the first night of the band's 10th Annual Honda Civic Tour, at the PNC Bank Arts Center in Holmdel, New Jersey. Spin described the performance as "sound[ing] so big you'd think there were twice as many musicians onstage."

The song received largely favorable reviews from contemporary music critics. BBC Music called the song "texturally delightful," and Chad Grischow of IGN was positive in his assumptions of the song, writing, "The energetic, smattered beat and shimmering riffs of rapidly flailing 'Ghost on the Dance Floor' does a brilliant job expressing the conflicted feelings involved with having a deceased friend's memory come rushing back with a song." Thomas Nassiff of AbsolutePunk mentioned the song in a glowing review of Neighborhoods, noting that it sets the mood "fittingly" for what is an "absolute gem of an album." Kyle Ryan of The A.V. Club also made note of its use as an opening song, comparing it to the band's previous album: "Fans who didn't enjoy that album's stylistic detours may be alarmed by the Cure-esque keyboard that opens the album." Both NME and Entertainment Weekly cited the song as a highlight from Neighborhoods.

Slant Magazine's Jonathan Keefe was less impressed with the song: "The narrative is dictated more by its rhyme scheme than by a purposeful story." He also criticized its production, noting that "The layering of sounds in Barker's percussion on [the song] is impressive, but the fact that his drumming is actually foregrounded in the mix both obscures the song's melody and detracts from whatever effect the band was trying to achieve with the heavy reverb on DeLonge's vocal track."

== Chart positions ==
=== Weekly charts ===
Chart (2011)	Peak position
US Rock Digital Songs (Billboard)	28

== Personnel ==
Blink-182

- Tom DeLonge – vocals, guitar, producer
- Mark Hoppus – vocals, bass guitar, producer
- Travis Barker – drums, producer

Additional musicians

- Roger Joseph Manning Jr. – keyboards

Production

- Chris Holmes – co-producer
- "Critter" – co-producer
- Tom Lord-Alge – mix engineer
- Femio Hernández – mixing assistance
