= 20th Anniversary Tour (Blink-182) =

2011–14 concert tour by Blink-182

- Tour by Blink-182
- Promotional poster for tour
- Location: Europe; North America; Oceania
- Associated album: Neighborhoods; Dogs Eating Dogs; Blink-182
- Start date: August 16, 2011
- End date: October 11, 2014
- Legs: 6
- No. of shows: 76
- Supporting acts: Against Me!; Rancid; The All-American Rejects; Four Year Strong; Twin Atlantic; The Blackout; Royal Republic; Lower Than Atlantis

Blink-182 concert chronology
- 10th Annual Honda Civic Tour (2011); 20th Anniversary Tour (2011–14); We Are Pirates Tour (2016)

The 20th Anniversary Tour (originally known as the Neighborhoods Tour) is the eleventh headlining concert tour by American rock band, blink-182. It began on August 16, 2011, in Montreal, Quebec and finished on October 11, 2014, in Las Vegas, Nevada. The tour supported the band's sixth studio album, Neighborhoods (2011). Originally planned to begin in Europe, the tour was postponed so the band could focus on finishing their album. The tour visited Canada in 2011, the United States and Europe in 2012, Australia in 2013, and Europe again in 2014. For select 2013 dates, the band celebrated the tenth anniversary of the release of their 2003 untitled album. The 20th Anniversary Tour was the last tour with Tom DeLonge, who left the band for the second time in 2015, until his return in 2022.

== Background ==
The tour was first announced in November 2010, shortly after the band performed at various music festivals in Germany, France and England. Initial dates revealed arena shows in Manchester, Newcastle upon Tyne. Nottingham, Birmingham and London. The tour would mark the band's first arena shows in seven years. Additional dates for the tour were announced in December 2010, with festival appearances scheduled for T in the Park and Oxegen. Four Year Strong was announced to open show in the United Kingdom. While promoting his talk show, Hoppus on Music, Mark Hoppus announced the band will tour the United States along with Europe.

In April 2011, the band postponed their European tour until 2012. Tom DeLonge stated the band's forthcoming album was not complete and they wanted to provide new songs on the tour, not repeating their previous tour. A detailed explanation followed on the band's official website. It says:

"It is with heavy hearts that we have to announce our planned 2011 European Summer tour has been rescheduled. When we booked the tour last year, we were confident that we would have the new album out before the Summer. Turns out we were mistaken as the album is taking longer than we thought and won't be out till later this year. We hoped we would have some new songs to play rather than do another 'greatest hits tour' which you all saw last Summer. As much as we know our fans would be cool with that, we feel that we owe you guys something new when you spend your money to come see us. Frankly, it's what needs to continue for us to remain vital. The three of us are working very hard to do what we set out to do when we re-formed...get a new blink-182 album recorded. Apologies to all of our fans who have bought tickets and were looking forward to the Summer shows but we'll be back soon with the rescheduled dates in Summer 2012, have a new album out and be able to play new songs for you all. Thanks for all of the continued support and understanding".

Shortly after this announcement, media outlets confirmed the band would tour the U.S. on the 10th Annual Honda Civic Tour. The band opened the long running concert tour back in 2001. They were joined by My Chemical Romance. With the album near completion in June 2011, the band toured Canada in August, separate from the Honda Civic Tour.

== Opening acts ==
- Against Me! (Canada)
- Rancid (Canada)
- The All-American Rejects (Europe, select dates)
- Four Year Strong (Birmingham—7 June, London—8 June, Dublin, Belfast)
- Twin Atlantic (London—9 June, Manchester, Birmingham—16 June, Sheffield, Newcastle, Glasgow)
- The Blackout (Bournemouth, Cardiff, Nottingham, Liverpool)
- Royal Republic (Germany)
- Lower Than Atlantis (London;25 July)

== Setlist ==
1. "Feeling This"
2. "Up All Night"
3. "The Rock Show"
4. "What's My Age Again?"
5. "Down"
6. "I Miss You"
7. "Stay Together for the Kids"
8. "Dumpweed"
9. "Not Now"
10. "Always"
11. "Violence"
12. "After Midnight"
13. "First Date"
14. "Heart's All Gone"
15. "Dick Lips"
16. "Man Overboard"
17. "Ghost on the Dancefloor"
18. "All the Small Things"
19. "Josie"

Encore

22. "Untitled I" (contains elements of "Can a Drummer Get Some?", "Beat Goes On", "Let's Go" and "Misfits") (Instrumental Interlude)
23. "Carousel"
24. "Dammit"
25. "Family Reunion"

Notes

- During the concert at the LG Arena, the band performed "Reckless Abandon" and "Going Away to College".
- During the concert at the Manchester Arena, the band performed "Wasting Time"
- During the concert at Glasgow S.E.C.C, the band performed "Wasting Time" and "Reckless Abandon".
- During the concert at the Motorpoint Arena Sheffield, the band performed "All of This"
- During the concert at the O_{2} Academy Brixton, the band performed "Reckless Abandon", "Going Away to College", "Dick Lips" and "All of This".

== Tour dates ==
List of 2011 concerts
Date	City	Country	Venue
August 16, 2011	Montreal	Canada	Bell Centre
August 17, 2011	Toronto	Canada	Molson Canadian Amphitheatre
August 25, 2011	Winnipeg	Canada	MTS Centre
August 26, 2011	Saskatoon	Canada	Credit Union Centre
August 27, 2011	Edmonton	Canada	Rexall Place
August 28, 2011	Calgary	Canada	Scotiabank Saddledome
August 31, 2011	Vancouver	Canada	Rogers Arena
October 29, 2011^{[A]}	New Orleans	United States	City Park

List of 2012 concerts
Date	City	Country	Venue
June 7, 2012	Birmingham	England	National Indoor Arena
June 8, 2012	London	England	The O_{2} Arena
June 9, 2012	London	England	The O_{2} Arena
June 12, 2012	Dublin	Ireland	The O_{2}
June 13, 2012	Belfast	Northern Ireland	Odyssey Arena
June 15, 2012	Manchester	England	Manchester Arena
June 16, 2012	Birmingham	England	LG Arena
June 17, 2012	Sheffield	England	Motorpoint Arena Sheffield
June 19, 2012	Newcastle	England	Metro Radio Arena
June 20, 2012	Glasgow	Scotland	Scottish Exhibition Hall 4
June 23, 2012^{[C]}	Neuhausen ob Eck	Germany	Neuhausen ob Eck Airfield
June 24, 2012^{[D]}	Scheeßel	Germany	Eichenring
June 25, 2012	Essen	Germany	Grugahalle
June 26, 2012	Frankfurt	Germany	Festhalle Frankfurt
June 28, 2012^{[E]}	Werchter	Belgium	Werchter Festival Grounds
June 30, 2012	Berlin	Germany	Max-Schmeling-Halle
July 1, 2012^{[G]}	Arras	France	Citadelle d'Arras
July 3, 2012	Milan	Italy	Mediolanum Forum
July 4, 2012^{[H]}	Lucca	Italy	Piazza Napoleone
July 5, 2012	Zürich	Switzerland	Hallenstadion
July 7, 2012	Bournemouth	England	Windsor Hall
July 8, 2012^{[H]}	Bodelva	England	Eden Project
July 10, 2012	Cardiff	Wales	Motorpoint Arena Cardiff
July 11, 2012	Nottingham	England	Capital FM Arena Nottingham
July 12, 2012^{[I]}	Liverpool	England	Echo Arena
July 14, 2012	Esch-sur-Alzette	Luxembourg	Rockhal
July 17, 2012^{[J]}	Nîmes	France	Arena of Nîmes
July 19, 2012	Barcelona	Spain	Sant Jordi Club
July 20, 2012	Madrid	Spain	Palacio de Deportes
July 21, 2012	Lisbon	Portugal	Pavilhão Atlântico
July 24, 2012	Manchester	England	O_{2} Apollo Manchester
July 25, 2012	London	England	O_{2} Brixton Academy
September 13, 2012	Thackerville	United States	WinStar Global Center
September 14, 2012	Thackerville	United States	WinStar Global Center
September 28, 2012	Las Vegas	United States	Boulevard Pool
September 29, 2012	Las Vegas	United States	Boulevard Pool

List of 2013 concerts
Date	City	Country	Venue
February 20, 2013^{[L]}	Sydney	Australia	Allphones Arena
February 22, 2013^{[L]}	Brisbane	Australia	Brisbane Exhibition Ground
February 23, 2013^{[K]}	Brisbane	Australia	Brisbane Exhibition Ground
February 24, 2013^{[K]}	Sydney	Australia	Sydney Olympic Park
February 26, 2013^{[L]}	Melbourne	Australia	Sidney Myer Music Bowl
February 27, 2013^{[L]}	Melbourne	Australia	Sidney Myer Music Bowl
March 1, 2013^{[K]}	Melbourne	Australia	Flemington Racecourse
March 2, 2013^{[K]}	Adelaide	Australia	Bonython Park
March 4, 2013^{[K]}	Perth	Australia	Claremont Showground
August 31, 2013^{[M]}	Calgary	Canada	Fort Calgary
September 1, 2013^{[N]}	Edmonton	Canada	Northlands Grounds
September 6, 2013	Montclair	United States	Wellmont Theater
September 7, 2013	Atlantic City	United States	Revel Ovation Hall
September 8, 2013	Uncasville	United States	Mohegan Sun Arena
September 10, 2013	Sayreville	United States	Starland Ballroom
September 11, 2013	New York City	United States	Music Hall of Williamsburg
September 12, 2013	Bethlehem	United States	Sands Bethlehem Event Center
September 14, 2013	Chicago	United States	Riot Fest
September 18, 2013^{[O]}	Santa Barbara	United States	Santa Barbara Bowl
September 19, 2013	Las Vegas	United States	Boulevard Pool
September 20, 2013^{[P]}	Chula Vista	United States	Sleep Train Amphitheatre

List of 2014 concerts
Date	City	Country	Venue
June 20, 2014	Montebello	Canada	Montebello Arena
August 6, 2014	London	England	O_{2} Brixton Academy
August 7, 2014	Lokeren	Belgium	Grote Kaai
August 8, 2014	London	England	O_{2} Brixton Academy
August 11, 2014	Budapest	Hungary	Óbudai-Sziget
August 13, 2014	Übersee	Germany	Festivalgelände Übersee
August 14, 2014	Sankt Pölten	Austria	Green Park
August 15, 2014	Prague	Czech Republic	Tipsport Arena
August 16, 2014	Leipzig	Germany	Störmthaler See
August 18, 2014	Stuttgart	Germany	Hanns-Martin-Schleyer-Halle
August 19, 2014	Dortmund	Germany	Westfalenhallen 1
August 20, 2014	Hamburg	Germany	Trabrennbahn Bahrenfeld
August 22, 2014^{[Q]}	Leeds	England	Bramham Park
August 24, 2014^{[Q]}	Reading	England	Little Johns Farm
October 11, 2014^{[R]}	Las Vegas	United States	MGM Resorts Village

Festivals and other miscellaneous performances

^{A} This concert was a part of the "Voodoo Experience"
^{C} This concert was a part of the "Southside Festival"
^{D} This concert was a part of the "Hurricane Festival"
^{E} This concert was a part of "Rock Werchter"
^{F} This concert was a part of the "Prague City Festival"
^{G} This concert was a part of the "Main Square Festival"
^{H} This concert was a part of the "Lucca Summer Festival"
^{I} This concert was a part of the "Liverpool Summer Pops"
^{H} This concert was a part of the "Eden Sessions"

^{J} This concert was a part of the "Festival de Nîmes"
^{K} These concerts were a part of the "Soundwave Festival"
^{L} These concerts were a part of the "Sidewaves"
^{M} This concert was a part of "X-Fest 2013"
^{N} This concert was a part of "Sonic Boom 2013"
^{O} This concert was a part of "KJEE Summer Round-Up"
^{P} This concert was a part of "91X X-Fest"
^{Q} These concerts were a part of the Reading and Leeds festivals
^{R} This concert was a part of the "Wine Amplified Festival"

Cancellations and rescheduled shows

June 18, 2011	Scheeßel, Germany	Eichenring	Rescheduled to June 24, 2012.
June 19, 2011	Neuhausen ob Eck, Germany	Flugplatz Neuhausen ob Eck	Rescheduled to June 23, 2012.
June 20, 2011	Frankfurt, Germany	Frankfurt Festhalle	Rescheduled to June 26, 2012.
June 27, 2011	Berlin, Germany	Kindl-Bühne Wuhlheide	Rescheduled to June 30, 2012 and moved to the Spandau Citadel.
June 23, 2011	Prague, Czech Republic	Výstaviště Praha-Holešovice	Rescheduled to June 29, 2012.
June 24, 2011	Essen, Germany	Grugahalle	Rescheduled to June 25, 2012.
June 26, 2011	Roeser, Luxembourg	Rue de la Montagne	Cancelled. This concert was a part of "Rock-a-Field"
June 27, 2011	Milan, Italy	Mediolanum Forum	Rescheduled to 3 July 3, 2012.
June 28, 2011	Lucca, Italy	Piazza Napoleone	Rescheduled to July 4, 2012.
July 1, 2011	Birmingham, England	National Indoor Arena	Rescheduled to June 7, 2012.
July 4, 2011	Liverpool, England	Echo Arena Liverpool	Rescheduled to July 12, 2012.
July 7, 2011	Sheffield, England	Motorpoint Arena Sheffield	Rescheduled to June 17, 2012.
July 8, 2011	Manchester, England	Manchester Evening News Arena	Rescheduled to June 15, 2012.
July 9, 2011	Kinross, Scotland	Balado	Cancelled. This concert was a part of "T in the Park".
July 10, 2011	Naas, Ireland	Punchestown Racecourse	Cancelled. This concert was a part of "Oxegen".
July 12, 2011	Newcastle, England	Metro Radio Arena	Rescheduled to June 19, 2012.
July 13, 2011	Nottingham, England	Capital FM Arena Nottingham	Rescheduled to July 11, 2012.
July 15, 2011	Birmingham, England	LG Arena	Rescheduled to June 16, 2012.
July 16, 2011	Cardiff, Wales	Motorpoint Arena Cardiff	Rescheduled to July 10, 2012.
July 18, 2011	London, England	The O_{2} Arena	Rescheduled to June 8, 2012.
July 19, 2011	London, England	The O_{2} Arena	Rescheduled to June 9, 2012.
August 30, 2011	Victoria, British Columbia	Save-On-Foods Memorial Centre	Cancelled
May 10, 2012	Thackerville, Oklahoma	WinStar Global Event Center	Cancelled
May 11, 2012	Thackerville, Oklahoma	WinStar Global Event Center	Cancelled
May 15, 2012	Rochester, New York	Blue Cross Arena	Cancelled
May 17, 2012	Manchester, New Hampshire	Verizon Wireless Arena	Cancelled
May 18, 2012	Uncasville, Connecticut	Mohegan Sun Arena	Cancelled
May 19, 2012	Asbury Park, New Jersey	North Beach	Cancelled. This concert is a part of "The Bamboozle"
May 20, 2012	Bethlehem, Pennsylvania	Sands Bethlehem Event Center	Cancelled
May 22, 2012	Quebec City, Canada	Colisée Pepsi	Cancelled
June 30, 2012	Berlin, Germany	Spandau Citadel	Moved to the Max-Schmeling-Halle.
July 26, 2012	London, England	O_{2} Academy Brixton	Cancelled

== Critical reception ==
The shows in Canada were well received by music critics. Rob Williams (Winnipeg Free Press) gave the concert at the MTS Centre four out of five stars. He says, "It didn't seem to matter to the crowd of 6,000 who ate everything up, from old favourites like 'Feeling This', 'Rock Show' and 'What's My Age Again?' to the new 'Up All Night' and 'After Midnight', both which lack the melodic hooks of their best material". For their show at Rexall Place, Mike Ross (Jam!) gave the band four out of five stars. .

The band's Music Hall of Williamsburg 9/11 benefit show received critical acclaim. "On Wednesday night, Blink tore through the tiny Brooklyn club, raging hard and bringing some much needed relief to a city still dealing with the terrorist attacks of a dozen years ago", wrote James Montgomery of MTV News. "There were no somber moments, just Blink's patented brand of hard-bopping pop punk (and the occasional masturbation joke). And based on how the crowd's reaction, it was just what this city needed." Patrick Flanary of Rolling Stone called it "easily Blink's smallest gig in ages", writing that "Music Hall of Williamsburg made for a wall-to-wall pit of fans hell-bent on slamming beers and slam-dancing. Even stage security joined in the fun; one bouncer, while corralling crowd-surfers, sang along to "I Miss You."" Mischa Pearlman of The Hollywood Reporter wrote that "They still know how to entertain and have fun, mixing the ri-dick-ulous with the emotional [...] [they] did both themselves and the charities they’re raising money for more than proud." Chris Payne of Billboard wrote that "The Music Hall of Williamsburg is usually reserved for buzz bands, established indie acts, and nostalgia tours, but Blink-182 was never one to play by the typical rock rules -- last night they nearly tore the place down with a intimate, frenzied performance for a tightly packed room of diehard fans." The Village Voice's Maria Sherman called the performance "better than anything", noting that "For Blink, with age comes consistency, and they showcased it by playing the set list they've played all tour, which mostly consists of the hits. It's consistent, but never complacent: this is the difference between the good and the great. Guess which camp Blink belong to?"
