= Heart's All Gone =

Song by Blink-182

from the album Neighborhoods
- Released: August 5, 2011
- Recorded: June 2010 – July 2011; Opra Music Studios, Henson Studios (Los Angeles, California); Neverpants Ranch (San Diego, California)
- Genre: Punk rock; pop punk
- Length: 3:15
- Label: DGC; Interscope
- Songwriters: Mark Hoppus; Tom DeLonge; Travis Barker
- Producers: Hoppus; DeLonge; Barker

"Heart's All Gone" is a song by American rock band Blink-182 from the band's sixth studio album, Neighborhoods (2011). The song, written by bassist Mark Hoppus, guitarist Tom DeLonge, and drummer Travis Barker, was released on August 5, 2011 as a pre-release track from Neighborhoods, although not a single. It is one of the band's fastest songs, and is largely a throwback to the sound of previous releases. In addition, it recalls the band's upbringings in the West Coast punk scene.

It received favorable reviews from contemporary music critics. A music video was released on September 28, 2011.

== Background ==
"Heart’s All Gone" is one of the band's fastest songs, alongside "Josie" and "The Party Song". "It's really fast, it's real dark, but I think it's just awesome. I'm totally proud of that song," said Hoppus.

== Music ==
"Heart's All Gone"
The song is one of the fastest the group has ever recorded.

"Heart's All Gone" is reminiscent of Blink's earlier material, with fast-paced guitars and drums. It largely recalls the band's upbringings in a "nurturing, often slapstick" Southern California punk scene, and was compared to their late-1990s contemporaries, Bad Religion and Pennywise, as well as NOFX. James Montgomery of MTV News compared the song's heavier sound to that of the band's second studio album, Dude Ranch (1997), and the band's 2003 track "Stockholm Syndrome". Jason Lipshutz of Billboard opined that the song's lyrics, namely "Take off the gloves / We fell in love by the side of the road / This desert will break you down" reference a "souring romance set in Las Vegas."

== Music video ==
A music video for the song, directed by Jason Bergh, premiered on September 28, 2011. It features the band performing the song live at their Atlanta, Georgia stop on the 10th Annual Honda Civic Tour.

== Reception ==
"Heart's All Gone" was the second song to debut from the band's sixth studio album, Neighborhoods. In contrast to the debut of the first single, "Up All Night", from Neighborhoods — on influential Los Angeles rock station KROQ — "Heart's All Gone" was released to a much more subdued fanfare, with a simple link from Hoppus' Google+ profile. The link revealed a special site (www.heartsallgone.com), titled and instructing users to "Command the A", by pressing the command (or control) button plus the A key on their keyboards. Doing so would reveal the lyrics and an MP3 download of the song. The song was one of the first the band performed from Neighborhoods, alongside "After Midnight", "Ghost on the Dance Floor" and "Up All Night", and was debuted on the first night of the band's 10th Annual Honda Civic Tour, at the PNC Bank Arts Center in Holmdel, New Jersey.

James Montgomery of MTV News commended the song's "breakneck guitars, yelped vocals and cascading drums," making reference to his own personal anticipation for Neighborhoods: "From the sound of things, the new Blink-182 may very well be adept at everything [...] Sort of only makes the anticipation that much greater." Jon Dolan of Rolling Stone gave the song three stars out of five, writing, "The second taste of Blink's comeback LP reboots their bubblegum punk, setting a post-breakup bitchfest to shrink-wrapped hardcore that's pitched perfectly between the mosh pit and the food court." BBC Music described the song as "blisteringly fast," commending Barker's drum work on the song. Thomas Nassiff of AbsolutePunk called the song "instantly accessible," noting that, for fans, "[the song] the high-energy pop-punk track we all wanted." Kyle Ryan of The A.V. Club referenced it as "a stripped-down punk song that sounds like late-'90s Blink in the best way. It’s also one of the few songs where Mark Hoppus sings lead."

== Personnel ==
Blink-182

- Mark Hoppus – vocals, bass guitar, guitar, producer
- Tom DeLonge – guitar, producer
- Travis Barker – drums

Production

- Chris Holmes – co-producer, mix engineer
- Jeff "Critter" Newel – co-producer
