= Neighborhoods (Blink-182 album) =

- Standard edition album cover (Note: The deluxe edition uses the same artwork, but the colors are inverted.)

Studio album by Blink-182
- Released: September 26, 2011
- Recorded: June 2010 – July 2011
- Studios: Opra Music, Henson Recording (Los Angeles, California); Neverpants Ranch (San Diego, California)
- Genres: Alternative rock; pop-punk; post-hardcore; progressive punk
- Length: 36:00
- Labels: DGC; Interscope
- Producer: Blink-182

Blink-182 chronology
Greatest Hits (2005)	Neighborhoods (2011)	Dogs Eating Dogs (2012)

Blink-182 studio chronology
Blink-182 (2003)	Neighborhoods (2011)	California (2016)

Singles from Neighborhoods
- 1. "Up All Night" Released: July 14, 2011; 2. "After Midnight" Released: September 6, 2011

Neighborhoods is the sixth studio album by American rock band Blink-182, first released in the UK and Europe on September 26, 2011 and a day later in the United States, through DGC Records and Interscope. Its eight-year gap from their untitled album marks the longest between two albums from the band to date. Due to conflicts within the trio, the band entered an indefinite hiatus in 2005, and the members explored various side projects. After two separate tragedies connected to the band and their entourage, the members of Blink-182 decided to reunite in late 2008, with plans for a new album and tour. It was the last studio album to feature founding member Tom DeLonge until his return on 2023's One More Time....

The band's studio autonomy, tours, managers, and side projects slowed down the recording process, which lasted over two years. After the death of longtime producer Jerry Finn, Blink-182 struggled to self-produce Neighborhoods, working separately in a pair of California studios. A lack of communication and creative momentum impacted the band's dynamics—ultimately delaying the album and deepening existing tensions. Neighborhoods blends the band's signature pop-punk sound with synthesizer-heavy progressive elements. The trio wrote lyrics on such subjects as isolation, confusion, and death. The title reflected the band's different creative styles, like unique areas in a city, with artwork and sleeve details honoring loved ones and personal connections.

Blink-182 returned to a changed music industry for Neighborhoods, navigating a diminished rock market and shifting label support. Although it debuted at No. 2 on the Billboard 200, the album's commercial performance fell short of label expectations. It was released to mixed reviews from critics: some felt it was a natural evolution from the band's previous releases, while others found it stale and disjointed. "Up All Night" and "After Midnight" were released as singles, with both attracting modest success on Billboard's Alternative Songs chart.

== Background ==
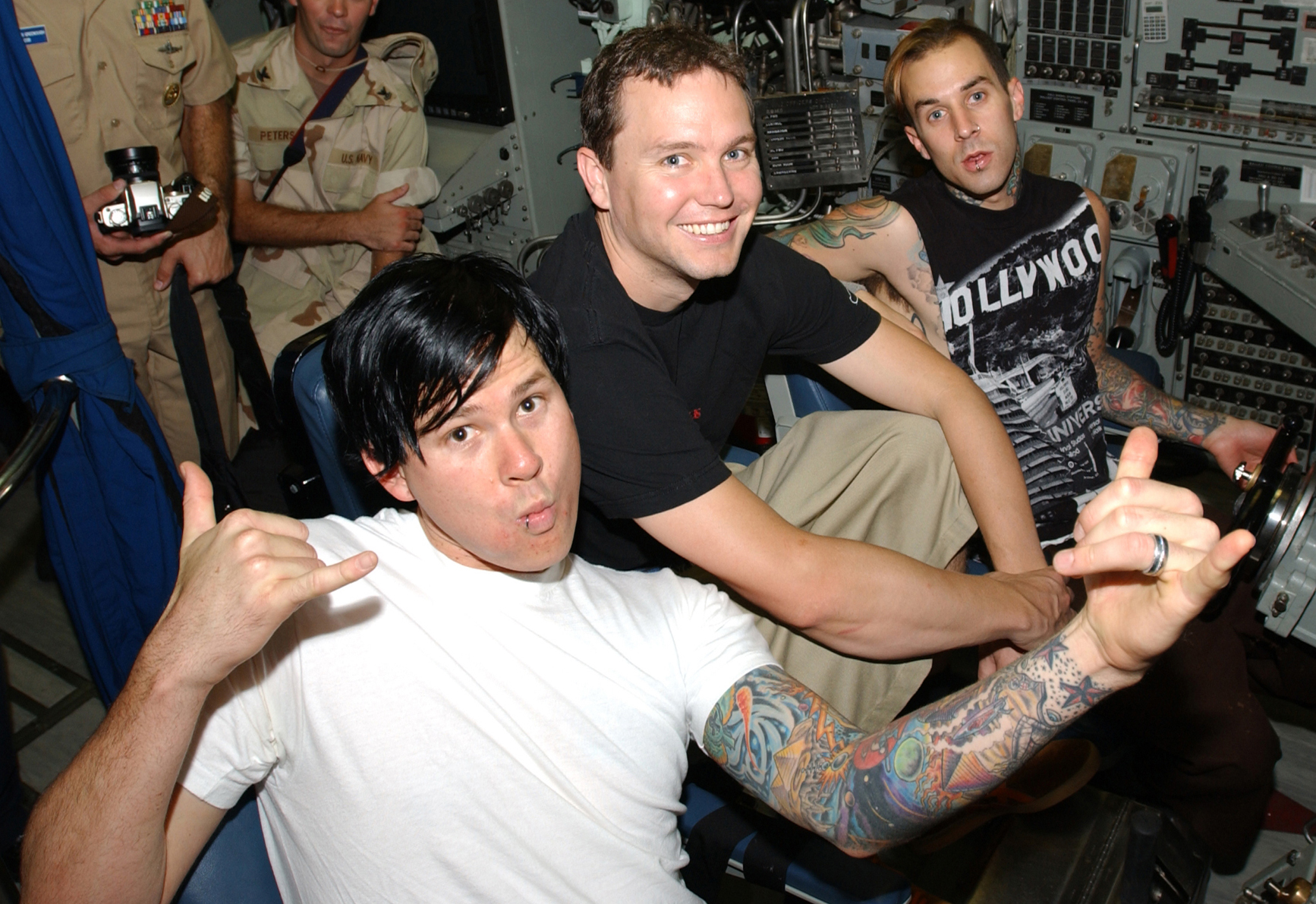
Following Barker's near-fatal plane crash, DeLonge mailed Barker this 2003 photo of the trio aboard a submarine in the Middle East, reminding him of "who we were."

Blink-182 announced on February 22, 2005, that they would be going on an "indefinite hiatus". The decision, in reality a breakup of the group, stemmed from internal band tension, which had arisen in late 2004 during their European tour. Guitarist and vocalist Tom DeLonge expressed his desire to take a half-year respite from touring in order to spend more time with family. Bassist/vocalist Mark Hoppus and drummer Travis Barker were dismayed by his decision, which they felt was an overly long break. Following the 2004 Indian Ocean earthquake, DeLonge agreed to perform at Music for Relief's Concert for South Asia, a benefit show to aid victims. Further arguments ensued during rehearsals, rooted in the band members' increasing paranoia and bitterness toward one another. DeLonge felt his priorities were "mad different", and the breakdown in communication led to heated exchanges, resulting in his exit from the group. During the hiatus, DeLonge formed the rock band Angels & Airwaves, while Barker and Hoppus continued playing together in +44. Two events in late 2008 would lead to the band's eventual reformation: the death of longtime producer Jerry Finn (who suffered a cerebral hemorrhage) and a near-fatal plane crash involving Barker and collaborator DJ AM.

The two incidents raised rumors of a possible Blink-182 reunion. Hoppus was alerted about Barker's accident by a phone call in the middle of the night and jumped on the next flight to the burn center. DeLonge learned of the crash via the TV news at an airport while waiting to board a flight. He landed and mailed a letter and two photographs to Barker: a photo of Blink aboard a submarine in the Middle East and another of himself and his two kids. "One was 'Do you remember who we were?' and the other was 'This is who I am now'" DeLonge said. He also commented that, no matter what had happened between himself and Barker in the past, "none of it matters when it comes down to somebody getting hurt". Hoppus first spoke on the matter in a blog post in November 2008, writing that he "hadn't had it in him" to post, adding that "these past two months have been the hardest times I can remember". He also revealed that he, DeLonge, and Barker had all spoken in the aftermath. Barker quashed reunion rumors in December, but noted that they had been getting along.

Talk of a reunion commenced weeks after the trio began speaking again. After a two-hour phone conversation between DeLonge and Hoppus, an arrangement was made for the trio to meet up at Hoppus and Barker's Los Angeles studio in October 2008. DeLonge was the first to approach the subject of reuniting. The trio had, in Hoppus' words, "two gnarly heart-to-hearts", during which the three opened up. "Tom had just kind of come out to Los Angeles for the day", recalled Hoppus, "I remember he said, 'So, what do you guys think? Where are your heads at?' And I said, 'I think we should continue with what we've been doing for the past 17 years. I think we should get back on the road and back in the studio and do what we love doing'". Eventually, the band appeared for the first time on stage together in nearly five years as presenters at the 51st Grammy Awards on February 8, 2009. The band's official website was updated with a statement: "To put it simply, we're back. We mean, really back. Picking up where we left off and then some. In the studio writing and recording a new album. Preparing to tour the world yet again. Friendships reformed. 17 years deep in our legacy."

== Recording and production ==
=== Pre-production ===
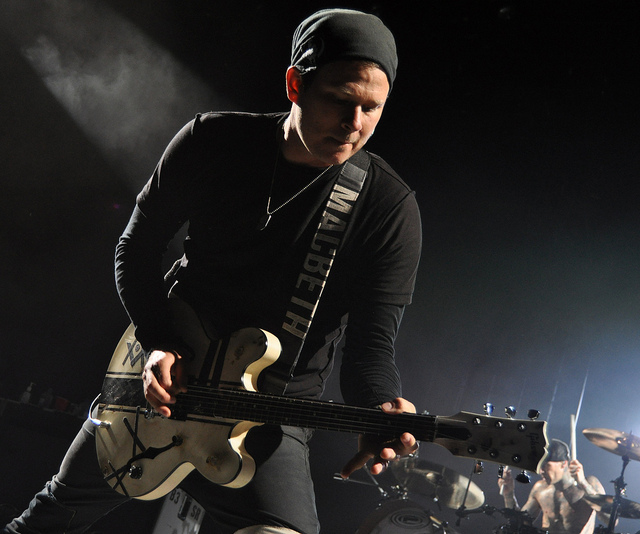
Guitarist Tom DeLonge in 2011

The band approached recording with cautious excitement. Hoppus said: "When Blink got back together, it was like we were huddled around a tiny flame, and no one wanted to breathe too hard and blow it out. [...] We weren't taking Blink for granted anymore. We were respectful of each other and careful to protect the spark we shared when we played." They first began making demos of new material in 2009, with all three bringing song ideas that they had worked on for years. They completed four demos, with one near completion, "Up All Night". The band wanted to release it as a single then but quickly realized that it was too ambitious to complete it before their reunion tour began in July. Sessions were stalled by the summer 2009 reunion tour, during which the band reconnected musically and emotionally. They did a large amount of writing before leaving on tour, but upon its completion, they took time off to "chill and do other stuff", with intentions to regroup in 2010. In June and July 2010, Blink-182 spent time at their rehearsal spot, with the intention to wrap up touring by September and stay in the studio for the rest of the year until the record was finished. The album sessions were to be partially documented in The Blinkumentary, which was scrapped in 2012.

As they began work on their comeback album, the band faced a series of medical setbacks. In 2010, DeLonge received a skin cancer diagnosis, but it was successfully treated. Still recovering from the plane crash, Barker experienced numerous medical issues. He toured with broken vertebrae and underwent several surgeries to fix his numbed left hand. Though he wasn't fully ready for studio work, he pushed through, driven by the excitement of creating again, though he still had bandages and sores all over his hands and legs: "I was still healing", he told Rolling Stone. "I had scabs all over my body and was, like, a bloody mess. It was just way too soon." He also endured personal losses during the album's creation. Barker's close friend and fellow plane crash survivor, DJ AM, died of an overdose.

=== Recording ===
"We weren't even in the same room [...] We were barely talking; we were in different studios. No one really commented on each other's parts, no one pressed anyone's buttons. Everyone was on eggshells."

— Tom DeLonge, reflecting on the album's production in 2012

After the death of longtime producer Jerry Finn in 2008, the band faced the challenge of producing the record on their own. Finn had overseen their last three albums and acted as an adviser, mediator, and creative guide. "I honestly still feel like he's in the studio with us", Hoppus reflected. "Everything I know about recording, I learned from Jerry". In his absence, the band opted to self-produce the album. "Maybe that was a mistake", Hoppus said in his memoir. No one was driving, and the process was a mess". Instead of a producer, each band member had their own dedicated sound engineer, with Hoppus and DeLonge receiving help from longtime co-production partners Chris Holmes and "Critter", respectively. DeLonge, who was against using a producer after self-producing most of his Angels & Airwaves records, described the band situation as "very democratic", noting that he learned during the recording process to "let go and be okay with not being able to control everything".

Altogether, the recording process for Neighborhoods was disconnected and disjointed. This was due to the way the band chose to work—in bits and pieces, alone and together, in a pair of California studios—in addition to each member's busy schedules. Their lives looked very different compared to before the first breakup: DeLonge had become an innovator with his company, Modlife. Barker continued to oversee his apparel company Famous Stars and Straps and worked both on a solo album and a new record with his group Transplants. Meanwhile, Hoppus—balancing his new TV show, Hoppus on Music—was set to leave the country entirely, moving thousands of miles to London, England. The three musicians were rarely in the same room while recording, opting to work on their parts individually. Ideas were exchanged via email, and engineers met in person to trade files on hard drives. The album was recorded at both DeLonge's studio in San Diego and in Los Angeles by Hoppus and Barker. Neighborhoods also featured previously uncredited guitar contributions from Hoppus, who later revealed that he played guitar on nearly all of the songs featuring his lead vocals.

=== Delays ===
"I was in London at the time looking for a house. I remember having an awful conversation [on the phone] about the tour and going to Carnaby Street afterwards. I walked into a store and this guy came up and said, 'Dude, I've got tickets to your shows! I'm coming to see you this summer'. We hadn't made the final decision at this point, but I felt [like] such an ass. I felt so duplicitous".

— Mark Hoppus on canceling the UK tour in order to complete the album

The recording and release of Neighborhoods was delayed multiple times. Hoppus attributed this to the band learning to work by themselves without Finn. A result of the trio's split was each member hiring his own attorney, and, during the Neighborhoods sessions, they had a total of four managers. Later, it was revealed that DeLonge and Hoppus would go months without direct communication, only speaking through their managers. Late in the process, Barker became convinced that the album was not up to their standards and urged his bandmates to postpone a planned tour. Under pressure, Blink-182 released a statement in April 2011 that effectively rescheduled all European tour dates due to the recording delays. Though DeLonge objected to the "hugely expensive" move, Barker and Hoppus stood by their belief that touring should happen only with fresh material to perform.

Geffen set a July 31 deadline for the record amid concerns about the band's volatility, explaining that there would be penalties if the album was not turned in on time. DeLonge joked that, "We'll probably actually drive it to the [Geffen] president's house at two in the morning and hand it through his bedroom window at the last possible minute". Mixing the album became an arduous affair. DeLonge was uninvolved, according to his bandmates, trusting his engineer, Critter, to make decisions. "Tom had washed his hands of the whole album", Hoppus lamented. Years later, Barker concurred, remarking: "Tom didn't even care about [Neighborhoods]. He didn't even listen to mixes or masterings from that record". Barker reportedly made things difficult too, however. In his autobiography, Hoppus reveals that the drummer insisted on listening to mixes in his Cadillac Escalade. The band went as far as renting an Escalade for him to approve mixes while on tour, but Hoppus said he could never be bothered to take time for it.

== Composition ==
=== Music and lyrics ===
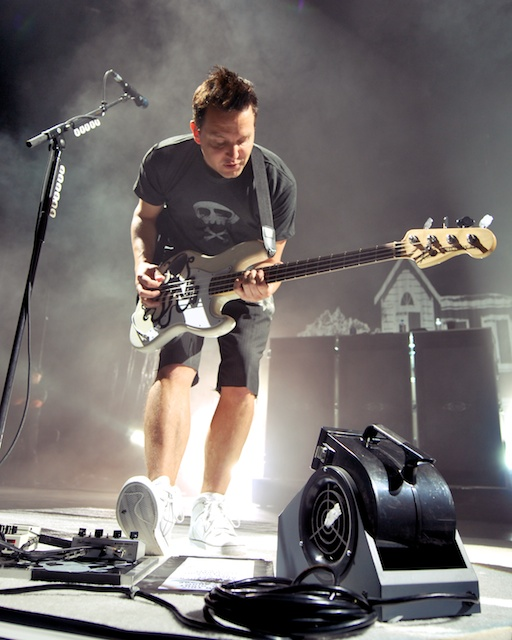
Bassist/vocalist Mark Hoppus shortly before the album's release. "I couldn't write a happy song for this record", he remarked.

Neighborhoods has been described as an alternative rock, pop-punk, progressive punk, and post-hardcore album, with pop rock hooks. Pre-release, the album was described by the band as ambitious, weird, and expansive. The music of the album was inspired by each musician's tastes: DeLonge's contributions bear hints of stadium rock, Barker infuses hip hop into his drum tracks, and Hoppus felt compelled by "weird indie rock." Hoppus stated early on that a goal for the album was to try many new things, but to remain a catchy and "poppy" sensibility. The lyricism of the album was influenced by heavy events in each member's life during the latter part of the decade, elements considered dark by Hoppus. The band made sure to produce a few throwback songs recalling their sound in the "mid-90s."

Though DeLonge hoped to retain the angst present in the band's previous work, he wanted to "deliver it in a package that's very modern, using instrumentations and formulas to launch you into different places with music that is not just three-chord pop-punk with riffs". He later felt the album was not progressive as he had wished: "I'm thinking, 'Why don't we do this? Why don't we create these landscapes?' I think we should have been pushing ourselves, and trying to push the genre forward". Likewise, Barker felt DeLonge wanted their music to be derivative of groups such as U2 or Coldplay, commenting, "For us, we were always like 'Blink is Blink, man. We want to sound like fucking Blink-182'".

Hoppus wrote lyrics dealing with breakdowns in communication and trust and tackled themes of isolation and confusion, but these lyrics were not specific to any of the band's history. He struggled with writing upbeat, happy songs for the album and attributed the dark lyricism to heavy events occurring shortly before the reunion. MTV News called Neighborhoods the "bleakest thing Blink have ever done, haunted by specters both real—depression, addiction, loss—and imagined", noting the constant lyrical mention of death in many tracks. The album mixes the electronic flourishes of +44 and the "laser-light grandeur" of Angels & Airwaves into what MTV News called "a sound that recalls nothing so much as dark streets and black expanses, mostly of the suburban variety".

=== Packaging and title ===
The title Neighborhoods evolved out of the trio discovering that each bring a very different aesthetic to the band, each like different neighborhoods in a city. "Everybody in the world thinks of something unique unto themselves when they hear the word 'Neighborhoods'", said Hoppus. "To some it is a big city, others a small town, others suburbia, everything. The world is wide, exciting and very different. That's what Neighborhoods means to me". The album artwork for the record was revealed on August 4, 2011, and featured the band name written atop a city skyline. The Neighborhoods sleeve contains many names close to the band, including Chloe (DeLonge's pet Labrador Retriever), Ava and Jon (DeLonge's daughter Ava Elizabeth and son Jonas Rocket), Jack (Hoppus' son), Landon, Alabama and Ati (Barker's son, daughter, and stepdaughter, Atiana), G! (Mike Giant, designer of the cover), and lastly, a memorial to DJ AM.

== Songs ==
"Ghost on the Dance Floor"
"Ghost on the Dance Floor" opens with an extended drum solo over a synthesizer.

"Heart's All Gone"
Compared to the band's 1997 sophomore record Dude Ranch in sound, "Heart's All Gone" also recalls the band's upbringings in the West Coast punk scene.

"Ghost on the Dance Floor" opens the album and is specifically about "hearing a song you shared with someone that's passed". The track resonated with Barker, who called DeLonge one night because the song affected him while listening to it, due to the death of DJ AM. "Natives" first arose from a tribal beat Barker created in the studio, and the song's title changed multiple times before settling on simplicity. "Up All Night" is the album's oldest song, dating to just after the band's 2009 reunion, when they grouped together and produced demos. The band returned to it multiple times over the recording process, each time making it heavier than before. "After Midnight" was one of four new songs birthed from a last-minute writing session after the band canceled their European tour. Barker's favorite track (and originally titled "Travis Beat") was written in separate studios but composed and recorded together.

"Snake Charmer", initially titled "Genesis", as a reference to the Book of Genesis, is based on the biblical story of Adam and Eve. It predates the band's reunion, and was a guitar riff DeLonge kept around to expand upon in the future. The song's coda was composed by Barker and engineer Chris Holmes. Hoppus composed two versions of "Heart's All Gone", one fast and one slow, and ended up liking both, so the slower version serves as an interlude on the album's deluxe edition. "Wishing Well" was solely created by DeLonge, and is what Hoppus describes as the epitome of the album: "It's very catchy, but the lyrics are really, really dark and a little depressing". "Kaleidoscope" arose when Hoppus woke up with the song's opening lyrics in his head, which he expanded into a Descendents-ish classic punk song. "The mentality behind it is being a slacker in 2011", Hoppus said. "The 20s and 30s malaise that is America right now". It was also inspired by the album's lengthy recording process and the transformation of the band. "This Is Home" was originally titled "Scars to Blame", but changed considerably when Hoppus took the chorus and bridge and combined it with new lyrics written by DeLonge, morphing it into what he described as "an anthem for youthful abandon".

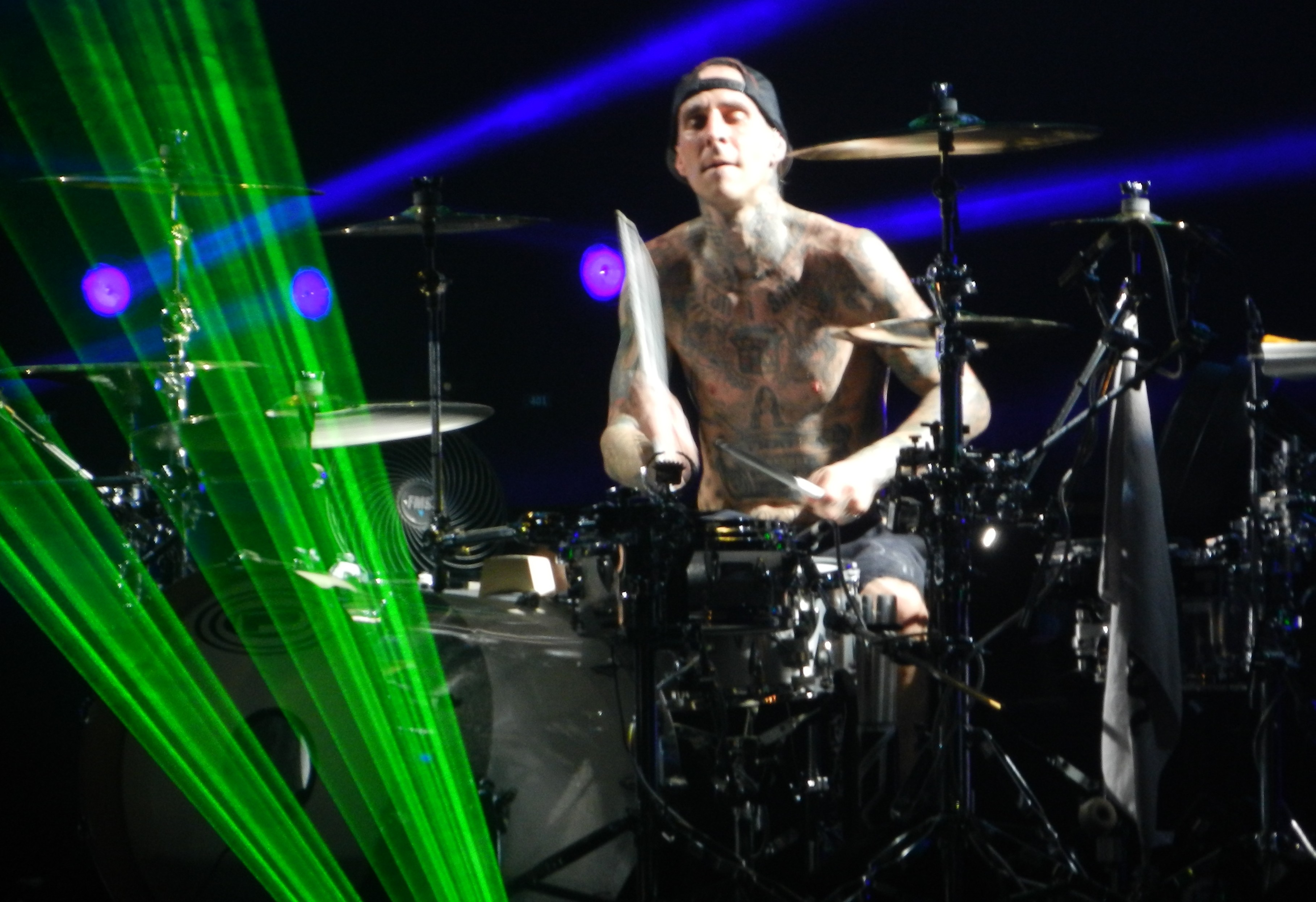
Drummer Travis Barker also recorded a solo album while making Neighborhoods.

"MH 4.18.2011" was a working title for a song that was to be named "Hold On", and represents a combination of Hoppus' initials and the date he wrote the song. However, DeLonge convinced Hoppus to keep the original title because he thought it sounded cool, likening it to a virus. The song was inspired by one occasion in which Hoppus was idle at a stoplight when a helicopter flew overahead, casting a large shadow. He began to think of war-torn countries and impoverished areas in which circling helicopters are a "way of life", and wrote the song to capture that mentality. The track is notable for being recorded without DeLonge's involvement, with Hoppus recording all of the guitars in addition to his usual bass and vocals. "Love Is Dangerous" arose from a minimalist, electronic ballad, but gradually took on a heavier sound when combined with guitars. Hoppus described "Fighting the Gravity" as a "very strange song", and highlighted its production: he ran a drum machine through his bass amp, and when the volume was turned up, it shook the entire building, causing a light fixture in the control room to start shaking. Hoppus and Holmes mic-ed up the fixture, creating the rattling heard near the beginning. "Even If She Falls" is an upbeat, "catchy love song" that Hoppus viewed as a positive note to end the record on.

== Release and promotion ==
"Wishing Well" UK radio promotional CD

Expectations for Neighborhoods were described by Alternative Press as "truly gigantic, both within the music industry and the record-buying mainstream". MTV News called Neighborhoods one of the most anticipated albums of 2010 when it was scheduled for that year, and then again as one of the most anticipated rock albums of 2011. Kerrang! also called it one of the most anticipated releases of 2011, and it was also featured on a list of Spin's "26 Fall Albums That Matter Most". The album title and release date were officially announced in July 2011. In preparation for the deluxe edition, the band compiled ten tracks as well as three extras; the deluxe edition tracks are sequenced differently from the standard version. "Up All Night" was released as the lead single on July 14, and the band began streaming another new song, "Heart's All Gone", through a dedicated website on August 4. The second single, titled "After Midnight", premiered on BBC Radio 1 on September 6. The album leaked two weeks before its release, despite being under a very high level of security. Hoppus commented to NME that he was surprised it took so long to leak and was relieved rather than annoyed that it had, reading warm comments about the album online.

Blink-182 returned to Interscope Records to distribute the record but found the music industry landscape dramatically different since the band's last effort. "The label itself has no resources or capital to do what they used to", DeLonge said in an interview with Billboard, "They just have you locked up on a contract". Interscope, since the band's breakup, had greatly pared down its rock department, in contrast to other labels. Blink-182 broke up at a heightened popularity period for pop-punk, but Neighborhoods was released in an era for the genre that Billboard described as "lacking exciting mainstream representation", in addition to falling sales for peer bands. The trio approached sponsorships, song releases, and social media incorporation during the rollout of Neighborhoods, with sites such as Facebook and Twitter present through each stage of the album's production. Although Modlife, DeLonge's revenue-sharing online service, was not involved in the promotion of the record, the band's personal business projects were integrated, such as Macbeth Footwear and Famous Stars and Straps. Retailers including Hot Topic and Interpunk.com carried different-colored vinyl editions of Neighborhoods that included MP3 download cards. The band partnered with AT&T in order to promote the record, appearing in a national spot for the HTC Status. They also partnered with Best Buy, which sold a uniquely colored HTC Status preloaded with the band's music. Television ads through networks such as ESPN were explored the week of release. In addition, Hoppus and DeLonge appeared in a "film festival" for the fan montage video of "Up All Night", honoring various internet fans through tongue-in-cheek categories.

Although the album was initially released in two editions, the deluxe version has since become the primary one and the band's preferred version: "The deluxe edition is the record as it should be heard", Hoppus has remarked. All vinyl pressings have preserved the deluxe tracklist.

== Critical reception ==
Professional ratings
Aggregate scores
Source	Rating
Metacritic	69/100
Review scores
Source	Rating
AllMusic	4/5 stars
Alternative Press	3.5/5 stars
The A.V. Club	B−
Entertainment Weekly	B−
IGN	9/10
Kerrang!	3/5 stars
NME	7/10
Rolling Stone	3/5 stars
Slant Magazine	2.5/5 stars
Spin	6/10

Neighborhoods received generally favorable reviews from critics, who praised its darker, more mature sound and musical experimentation, while some criticized its disjointed production and lack of cohesion. Tom Goodwyn of NME hailed the album as the band's best and "bravely progressive", while BBC Music's Mike Diver considered it an unexpectedly successful reunion despite the disjointed nature of its recording. Chad Grischow of IGN similarly regarded it as the band's most accomplished work, praising its artistic growth, while MTV News' James Montgomery emphasized its deeply personal, autobiographical lyricism.

Several critics welcomed the band's evolution beyond its youthful pop-punk roots. AllMusic's Stephen Thomas Erlewine praised the group for confronting familiar anxieties from the perspective of middle age rather than attempting to recapture its adolescence. Jon Dolan of Rolling Stone similarly noted the album's newfound sophistication and introspection, and Scott McLennan of The Boston Globe considered it a promising step forward. Kiel Hauck of PopMatters praised the album as one of the band's finest works, while Nitsuh Abebe of New York complimented its ambitious but accessible sound.

However, the album's ambition and fractured production also drew divided responses. Mark Sutherland of Kerrang! acknowledged its unevenness while praising its more inspired moments, whereas Scott Heisel of Alternative Press attributed its lack of cohesion to the absence of an outside producer and limited collaboration between band members. Michael Brown of Drowned in Sound likened the uneasy reunion to an awkward conversation following an argument, while Kyle Anderson of Entertainment Weekly found its strongest moments overly indebted to past successes. Several critics, including Kyle Ryan of The A.V. Club, Jonathan Keefe of Slant Magazine, and Chris Willman of TheWrap, questioned whether the band's expanded ambitions translated into stronger songwriting, while Mikael Wood of Spin found its subdued self-examination somewhat adrift from the band's earlier sound. Dan Caffrey of Consequence criticized the album's excessive melodrama, bloated production, and uneven songwriting.

== Commercial performance ==
Neighborhoods debuted at number two on the Billboard 200, with 151,000 copies sold in its first week. The album dropped to position 10 in its second week, and fell out of the top 20 soon afterward. It also debuted at number one on both the magazine's Alternative Albums and Top Rock Albums charts, number two on the Digital Albums chart, and number four on Tastemaker Albums. Internationally, the album performed best in Canada and Australia, where it also debuted in the number two position. In New Zealand, it peaked at number three, while it debuted at number six on the UK Albums Chart and in Germany.

Despite this, sales were not as smooth as the group's label, Interscope, had hoped, according to Billboard: "Despite the extended hiatus between albums, Neighborhoods failed to connect on the same scale as earlier releases". As of May 2016, it had sold 353,000 units in the US. The album was certified gold in the United Kingdom for sales of 100,000 units, and in Australia for sales of 35,000 copies.

== Touring ==
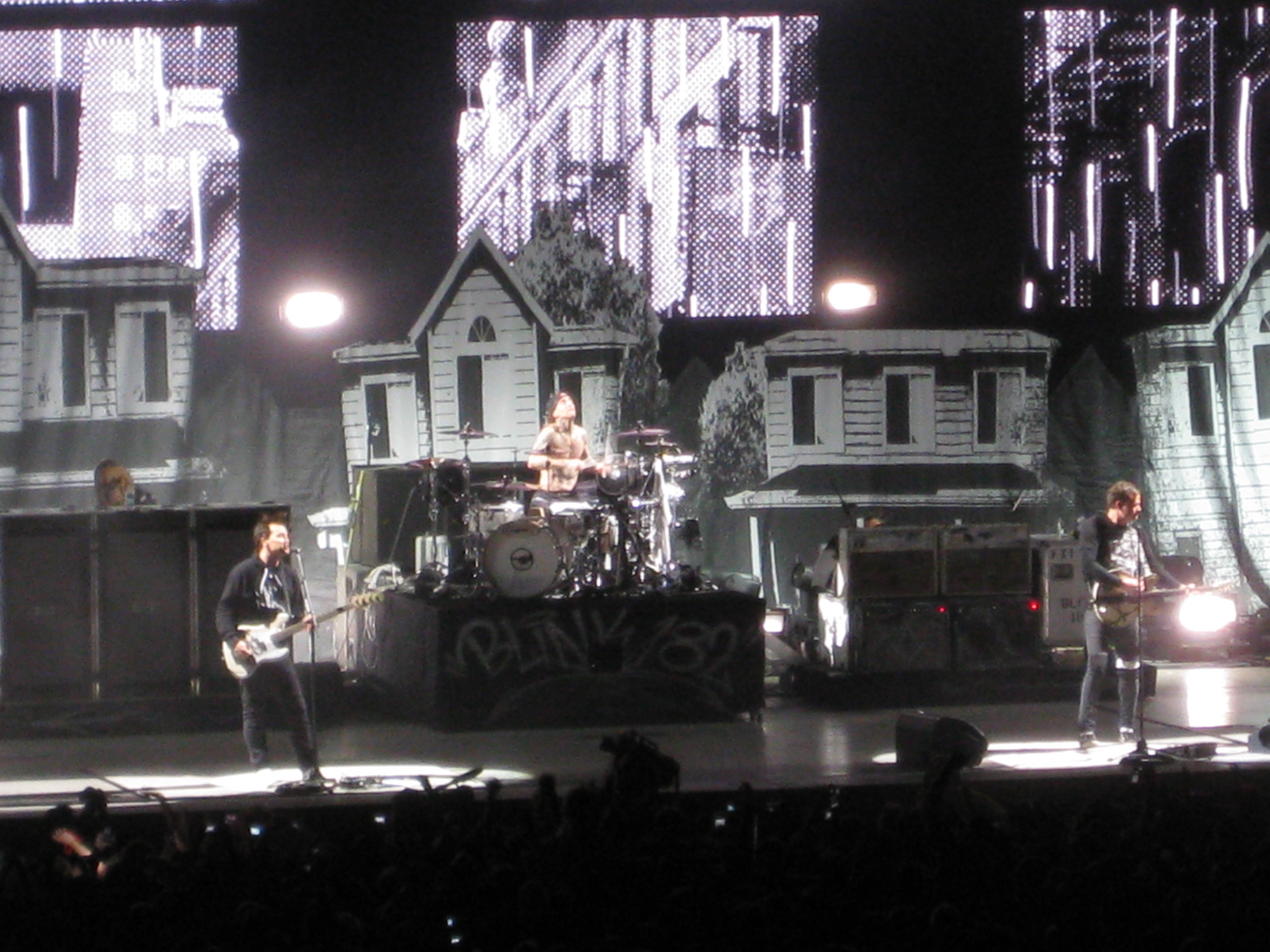
Blink-182 performing on the 2011 Honda Civic Tour in support of Neighborhoods

Following their reunion, Blink-182 embarked on the In Concert tour in 2009–2010, performing primarily material from their earlier catalog. The band intended to complete new material before touring again, but postponed a planned European tour in mid-2011 after recording sessions for Neighborhoods extended beyond schedule. The following month, they announced a co-headlining tour with My Chemical Romance, who were supporting their 2010 album Danger Days: The True Lives of the Fabulous Killjoys. Sponsored by Honda Civic, the tour ran from August to October 2011, hitting arenas and amphitheaters across North America. The band debuted several new songs during the tour, including "After Midnight" and "Ghost on the Dance Floor". The stage production incorporated lasers and a monochromatic set depicting a suburban neighborhood.

In his memoir Fahrenheit-182, bassist Mark Hoppus described the Neighborhoods tour as the most difficult of the band's career, recalling an increasingly strained atmosphere despite strong performances. According to Hoppus, the band members had little interaction outside of their time onstage. He also described mounting frustration among the band's crew and record label, as decisions regarding the album's release and promotion were repeatedly delayed or reversed. Barker's reluctance to fly following his near-fatal plane crash also necessitated additional travel days and performances in smaller markets, including casinos and private corporate events.

The band returned to Europe in June 2012 for the postponed dates, now promoted as part of their 20th Anniversary Tour. Barker traveled across the United States by bus before crossing the Atlantic aboard the Queen Mary 2 ocean liner to participate. The anniversary tour continued into 2013 with appearances at Australia's Soundwave Festival. As Barker remained unwilling to fly, drummer Brooks Wackerman filled in. His absence sparked a public dispute with Soundwave promoter AJ Maddah over conflicting accounts of the tour arrangements, escalating into legal threats and furthering the band's internal discord. The episode underscored the difficulty of the album's promotional cycle. "The Neighborhoods tour was, without question, the hardest tour [...] that tour broke people," Hoppus wrote.

== Legacy ==
Neighborhoods was initially regarded as a troubled comeback that reflected the band's creative divisions. In the years following the band's initial hiatus, emo-pop had risen to mainstream prominence, while physical record sales continued to decline. By 2011, the band's brand of pop-punk had largely receded from the spotlight, and its members, now approaching middle age, had developed increasingly divergent personal and professional interests. "No matter how big you’ve hit it, culture will eventually move on without you. Did Blink even belong in this world anymore?" Hoppus pondered in his memoir. Contemporary assessments of the album were mixed: The New York Times characterized the album as a creative and commercial disappointment, while Spin described it as grandiloquent.

As soon as 2012, the band were distancing themselves from Neighborhoods, regarding its fragmented recording process as detrimental to the finished album. Billboard later characterized it as a "largely forgotten" comeback attempt. "Neighborhoods was rough because we all three didn't agree on a sound," drummer Travis Barker recalled in 2016. In his memoir, Hoppus characterized the album's production as disorganized and lacking clear leadership, with the band members communicating largely through email. Nevertheless, he acknowledged that DeLonge had been ahead of his time in advocating for remote recording, a practice that became increasingly commonplace in subsequent years.

Over time, however, the album has undergone a degree of critical and personal reassessment. In 2021, DeLonge described Neighborhoods as "rad", while acknowledging that his ambitions to move the band toward a U2-inspired arena rock sound may have exceeded his bandmates' comfort levels. He maintained that the approach was successful when their competing musical sensibilities aligned. Later assessments have similarly highlighted the album's experimentation and ambition. Paste praised its "complicated, all-over-the-place alchemy", while other retrospective reviews have defended its expansive tone.

== Track listing ==
All tracks are written by Mark Hoppus, Tom DeLonge, and Travis Barker.

No.	Title	Lead vocals	Length
1.	"Ghost on the Dance Floor"	DeLonge	4:17
2.	"Natives"	DeLonge/Hoppus	3:55
3.	"Up All Night"	DeLonge/Hoppus	3:20
4.	"After Midnight"	DeLonge/Hoppus	3:25
5.	"Heart's All Gone"	Hoppus	3:15
6.	"Wishing Well"	DeLonge	3:20
7.	"Kaleidoscope"	Hoppus/DeLonge	3:52
8.	"This Is Home"	DeLonge	2:46
9.	"MH 4.18.2011"	Hoppus	3:27
10.	"Love Is Dangerous"	DeLonge	4:27
Total length:			36:00

Deluxe edition
No.	Title	Lead vocals	Length
1.	"Ghost on the Dance Floor"	DeLonge	4:17
2.	"Natives"	DeLonge/Hoppus	3:55
3.	"Up All Night"	DeLonge/Hoppus	3:20
4.	"After Midnight"	DeLonge/Hoppus	3:25
5.	"Snake Charmer" (bonus track)	DeLonge	4:27
6.	"Heart's All Gone Interlude" (bonus track)	(instrumental)	2:02
7.	"Heart's All Gone"	Hoppus	3:15
8.	"Wishing Well"	DeLonge	3:20
9.	"Kaleidoscope"	Hoppus/DeLonge	3:52
10.	"This Is Home"	DeLonge	2:46
11.	"MH 4.18.2011"	Hoppus	3:27
12.	"Love Is Dangerous"	DeLonge	4:27
13.	"Fighting the Gravity" (bonus track)	Hoppus	3:42
14.	"Even If She Falls" (bonus track)	DeLonge	3:00
Total length:			49:12

== Personnel ==
Adapted from the album's liner notes.

Blink-182

- Mark Hoppus – guitars, bass, vocals, production
- Tom DeLonge – guitars, vocals, production
- Travis Barker – drums, percussion, production

Additional musicians

- Roger Joseph Manning Jr. – keyboards

Production

- Neal Avron – mixing ("Even If She Falls")
- Jeff "Critter" Newell – co-producer
- Nicolas Fournier – mixing assistance ("Even If She Falls")
- Paul Frye – assistant Pro Tools engineer ("Natives")
- Femio Hernández – mixing assistance ("Ghost on the Dance Floor", "Up All Night", "After Midnight", Snake Charmer", "Wishing Well", "This Is Home", "MH 4.18.2011")
- Chris Holmes – co-producer, mixing ("Heart's All Gone Interlude", "Heart's All Gone", "Kaleidoscope", "Love Is Dangerous", "Fighting the Gravity")
- James Ingram – additional engineering
- Paul LaMalfa – assistant engineer
- Tom Lord-Alge – mixing ("Ghost on the Dance Floor", "Up All Night", "After Midnight", Snake Charmer", "Wishing Well", "This Is Home", "MH 4.18.2011")
- Paul Suarez – Pro Tools engineering ("Natives")
- Andy Wallace – mixing ("Natives")

Design

- Mike Giant – illustrations
- Estevan Oriol – photography
- Liam Ward – layout and design

== Charts and certifications ==
=== Weekly charts ===
Chart (2011)	Peak position
Australian Albums (ARIA)	2
Austrian Albums (Ö3 Austria)	7
Belgian Albums (Ultratop Flanders)	21
Belgian Albums (Ultratop Wallonia)	34
Canadian Albums (Billboard)	2
Dutch Albums (Album Top 100)	58
French Albums (SNEP)	33
German Albums (Offizielle Top 100)	6
Irish Albums (IRMA)	12
Italian Albums (FIMI)	11
Japanese Albums (Oricon)	10
Mexican Albums (Top 100 Mexico)	15
New Zealand Albums (RMNZ)	3
Norwegian Albums (VG-lista)	26
Scottish Albums (Official Charts)	5
Spanish Albums (Promusicae)	31
Swedish Albums (Sverigetopplistan)	32
Swiss Albums (Schweizer Hitparade)	11
UK Albums (Official Charts)	6
UK Rock & Metal Albums (Official Charts)	1
US Billboard 200	2
US Top Alternative Albums (Billboard)	1
US Digital Albums (Billboard)	2
US Top Rock Albums (Billboard)	1
US Indie Store Album Sales (Billboard)	4
US Billboard Vinyl Albums	3

=== Year-end charts ===
Chart (2011)	Peak position
Australia (ARIA)	88
US Billboard 200	138
US Top Alternative Albums (Billboard)	17
US Top Rock Albums (Billboard)	23

=== Certifications ===
Region	Certification	Certified units/sales
Australia (ARIA)	Gold	35,000^{^}
United Kingdom (BPI)	Gold	100,000^{‡}
^{^} Shipments figures based on certification alone.^{‡} Sales+streaming figures based on certification alone.
