= Dogs Eating Dogs =

- Original release cover. Rerelease cover has added hyphen (-) between "Blink" and "182".

EP by blink-182
- Released: December 18, 2012
- Recorded: November 2012
- Studios: Neverpants Ranch (San Diego, California); Opra Music Studios (Los Angeles, California)
- Genre: Progressive punk
- Length: 19:00
- Label: Self-released
- Producer: Blink-182

Blink-182 chronology
Neighborhoods (2011)	Dogs Eating Dogs (2012)	Icon (2013)

Singles from Dogs Eating Dogs
- 1. "Boxing Day" Released: December 10, 2012

Dogs Eating Dogs is an EP by American rock band Blink-182, released on December 18, 2012. Self-funded and issued independently following the band’s departure from Interscope Records, the project was distributed through guitarist Tom DeLonge's digital platform, Modlife. The EP emerged during a period of ongoing internal tensions, with the band members seeking to reconnect creatively after the fragmented development of their previous album, Neighborhoods. DeLonge championed Modlife as a new model for music distribution, but the other band members were hesitant to integrate the platform, fearing it might complicate or detract from their creative efforts.

The recording process for Dogs Eating Dogs was condensed, with the band writing, recording, mixing, and mastering five songs in just over a month. Sessions were held at DeLonge's Neverpants Ranch studio in San Diego and drummer Travis Barker's Opra Music Studios in Los Angeles, with co-producer Chris Holmes engineering the tracks across both locations. Musically, the EP blends punk with progressive elements, incorporating electronic drums, acoustic textures, hip-hop influences, and experimental instrumentation. Song topics include post-holiday ennui (the single "Boxing Day"), and a song for DeLonge's wife, "Pretty Little Girl", which features a guest appearance from rapper Yelawolf.

Dogs Eating Dogs was initially released digitally with accompanying fan-focused holiday bundles and later saw a limited physical release on vinyl in 2020. The EP received generally positive reviews from critics, who praised its cohesion, energy, and willingness to experiment, with several commentators describing it as an underrated entry in the band's discography. Commercially, the release debuted at number 23 on the Billboard 200. Retrospective assessments have emphasized the EP's creative vitality amid a transitional era in the band's saga. It was the band's last studio recording with DeLonge until 2022.

== Background ==
Blink-182 reunited in 2009, generating widespread excitement with their return to touring and public appearances. However, reconnecting creatively proved challenging. Each member had pursued separate projects during the hiatus, leading to conflicting schedules and diverging priorities. These challenges manifested during the recording of their 2011 album Neighborhoods, which was largely produced remotely across multiple studios in California, with ideas exchanged via email rather than in person. Band members later reflected that the process was disjointed, with limited collaboration and communication, resulting in creative friction and the resurfacing of old tensions and resentments.

Both the band and its label, Interscope Records, were reportedly disappointed with the performance of what was termed a comeback album. By October 2012, the band parted ways with Interscope, becoming independent artists for the first time since their early career. Guitarist Tom DeLonge was ecstatic about the move, posting the news to Twitter and likening it to "freedom". Just weeks before Dogs Eating Dogs entered production, bassist Mark Hoppus publicly suggested that new Blink-182 music was unlikely to materialize anytime soon. Speaking in October, he remarked that the band’s next full-length release "probably [wouldn't] happen for about a year," noting their demanding tour schedule.

== Recording ==
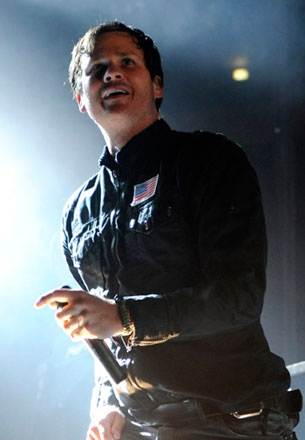
Guitarist Tom DeLonge, now a tech-sector entrepreneur, positioned the EP as both mending band relationships while promoting his company Modlife.

Dogs Eating Dogs emerged during a period of ongoing internal tensions within the band. The idea to record new material arose during Blink-182's 20th Anniversary Tour in mid-2012, when drummer Travis Barker proposed that the members regroup in person. Around the same time, Tom DeLonge arranged a "band summit" in Utah intended to address lingering conflicts; according to DeLonge, the meeting, which was meant as a focused retreat, ended up being a brief and awkward session held in a casino dressing room. Hoppus and Barker had grown skeptical of DeLonge's motivations for being in the band, surmising that his increasing focus on tech ventures—especially his digital platform Modlife—suggested he saw Blink-182 more as a financial engine than a creative priority. Modlife, a subscription-based fan-access service that DeLonge championed as a forward-thinking alternative to traditional music distribution, became a major point of conflict. For DeLonge, the service was a way to artists to build revenue in a post-Napster age, rather than relying on third-parties. Hoppus and Barker resisted incorporating Blink-182 into Modlife, believing it blurred personal business with the band's identity and risked monetizing fan engagement in ways they found exploitative. In his memoir, Hoppus acknowledges that DeLonge may have been ahead of his time in building the service, and that their unwillingness to get onboard put DeLonge in an awkward position.

This disagreement triggered ongoing arguments within the band, culminating in October 2012 when DeLonge proposed that Blink release a holiday EP—an idea Hoppus and Barker initially welcomed until DeLonge revealed he intended the release to run through Modlife. Despite their reservations, they relented, and development began on what became Dogs Eating Dogs. The EP was conceived, recorded, mixed, and mastered in just over a month, compared to the two years it took to complete the previous album. All the songs were tracked at DeLonge's Neverpants Ranch studio in San Diego and Barker's Opra Music Studios in Los Angeles. Co-producer Chris Holmes became the conduit between the members; in a podcast interview, he notes that he engineered the sessions between both studios, frequently driving between and sleeping occasionally. Rolling Stone reported that the trio met for four days in Los Angeles in November 2012 to develop the songs. Free from label oversight, the band approached the project with a sense of autonomy. Barker found the sessions as a revitalizing return to collaborative recording after the fragmented process behind Neighborhoods. Years later, Hoppus agreed; in his memoir, he writes that "The energy was supportive and enthusiastic. We sounded like an angsty, pissed-off blink-182. This was what it was all about. These moments of connection and creativity."

DeLonge privately viewed the EP as a "test" to see if the band could truly repair their relationship. After the band split with DeLonge, Hoppus acknowledged that he flew from his London home to Los Angeles on short notice for to make the EP, framing it as the type of sacrifice he and Barker made to keep the band functioning, despite tension. DeLonge later argued that he led much of the studio work over a two-month period, with Hoppus and Barker participated for roughly "eleven days."

== Composition ==
"Boxing Day"
"Boxing Day" combines acoustic instrumentation and sleigh bells with electronic drums.

Gregory Heaney of AllMusic said that the EP, like Neighborhoods, explores "a more expansive prog-punk sound", similar to Hoppus and Barker's aforementioned side project +44. DeLonge described the EP's overall sound as a "progressive punk" style, blending prog-rock and punk and in a way that he described as contemporary. The EP's opening track, "When I Was Young", revisits childhood from an adult viewpoint. Spin described the track as "cynical but sentimental", comparing the opening pipe organ to Arcade Fire. The title track is led by Hoppus and has been compared to Hoppus and Barker's previous side project, +44, and the band Alkaline Trio. Alternative Press referred to it as the "angriest, most aggressive song" on the EP. "Disaster" opens with "manipulated radio frequencies and anthemic marching drum hits" that recalls DeLonge's band Angels & Airwaves. "Boxing Day", originally titled "The Day After Christmas", began as an acoustic folk number before Barker added an electronic drum kit, creating what Hoppus described as a "real kind of indie, strange, cool vibe to it." The fifth and final track, "Pretty Little Girl", was originally titled "I Got My Eye on You" and was written by DeLonge for his wife. It features a guest appearance from rapper Yelawolf. Barker was working with the rapper at the time for a collaborative project called Psycho White and pushed for his inclusion on the track. The track carries a new wave influence and synthesizers are most prominent in the mix. An alternate version of the song without the guest artist was also considered, but during the final stages of production the band and team gravitated toward the version featuring the rapper.

Holmes said from a production standpoint the band strived to give instruments more space in the mix, after they viewed Neighborhoods as having too many competing elements. From an engineering perspective, Holmes strived to carefully reproduce signature drum and vocal textures from the band's classic period, while tailoring instrument setups for each song section.

== Release ==
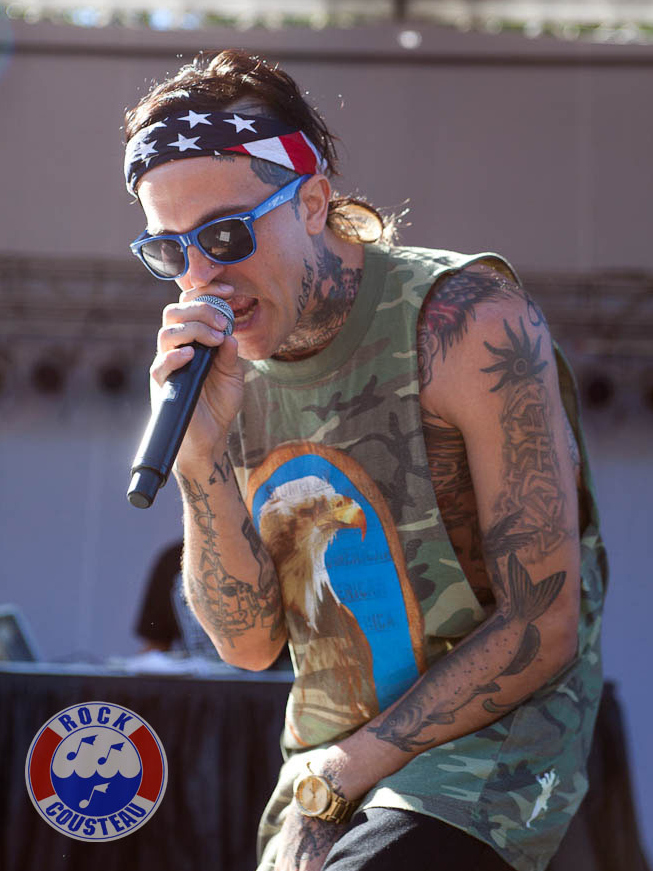
The EP contains an unexpected guest spot from rapper Yelawolf.

Dogs Eating Dogs was released independently, and distributed digitally through the iTunes Store and the band's website, with pre-orders offered directly to fans beginning on November 19, 2012. It was issued alongside a set of limited-edition holiday bundles, including posters, apparel, wrapping paper, and cards, framed as a playful seasonal offering surrounding the EP. The most elaborate option, the "Santa's Lap Package", cost $99.99; fans who ordered the highest-tier bundle before a specified deadline were guaranteed an autographed print, and all packages were advertised with the possibility of additional randomly included items. Barker characterized the EP as a fan-focused, celebratory undertaking following Blink-182's departure from the major-label system. The release of Dogs Eating Dogs coincided with an EP from Tom DeLonge’s other band, Angels & Airwaves, though the overlap was reportedly unplanned. According to Hoppus, DeLonge had not realized the timing and contacted him shortly before the release to clarify it was simply coincidental. A week prior to the EP's release, the song "Boxing Day" was streamed through Alternative Press.

Modlife handled the shipping of the accessories and other aspects of the release, and the preorder rollout for Dogs Eating Dogs encountered several logistical problems. "It was great because of the immediacy of it all, but it was kind of a drag because of the logistics of it all," Hoppus said in 2013. Fans reported issues with receiving the merchandise bundles as advertised, and the band members expressed frustration that the fulfillment process did not unfold as planned. DeLonge disputed the nature of the preorder issues, likening them to a form of self-sabotage, noting that at one point the EP was temporarily withdrawn from sale while approximately tens of thousands fans were attempting to purchase it. In his book, Hoppus suggests that Modlife was unable to adequately handle the volume and coordination required, and says that the episode only underscored the band's existing internal issues. It reinforced he and Barker's concerns about the platform's viability, while Delonge reportedly interpreted the backlash as evidence that his bandmates had hoped Modlife would fail. Dogs Eating Dogs marked the band's last collaboration with DeLonge prior to his 2015 expulsion from the group. In a post, DeLonge described the Modlife debacle as a moment of frustration that underscored the lingering tensions within the band: "That moment ultimately broke my spirit [...] I then realized that this band couldn't lose the years of ill will."

Dogs Eating Dogs debuted on the Billboard 200 at number 23 during the week of January 5, 2013, with first-week sales of 57,000 copies. It released during an era of diminished relevancy for both the band and rock altogether; it stayed on the chart for five weeks but otherwise produced no lasting singles. Initially, Dogs Eating Dogs was released exclusively in digital format, but the band explored options for a physical release in response to fan demand. The band worked with their management to make CD or vinyl versions available at a later date, but these plans were ultimately abandoned. "We had a holiday, and forgot about the physical product. We are not good businessmen,” Hoppus joked in 2013. "We didn’t get a physical product out because we were too lazy to print them up." In 2020, Blink-182 released Dogs Eating Dogs physically for the first time, offering three limited-edition vinyl variants. The release coincided with "182 Day", an annual fan celebration of the band, and was accompanied by a small merchandise collection that included dog-themed items such as bowls and leashes, available for a limited time. The vinyl reissue and associated merch received enthusiastic responses from fans, who expressed excitement at finally owning the EP in a physical format.

== Reception ==
Professional ratings
Aggregate scores
Source	Rating
Metacritic	68/100
Review scores
Source	Rating
AbsolutePunk	7/10
AllMusic	3/5 stars
Alternative Press	4/5 stars
Kerrang!	4/5 stars

Dogs Eating Dogs received generally positive reviews from music critics. Scott Heisel of Alternative Press gave it a pre-release review of high acclaim saying it is "just as strong if not stronger than anything on Neighborhoods." AllMusic writer Gregory Heaney said the EP "will surprise anyone who might have tuned out after 'All the Small Things' dominated the airwaves, but given the newfound maturity in their sound, the change is one that's both expected and welcomed." Kerrang! writer Paul Travers praised the "versatile, diffuse, but somehow far more focused collection of songs than were present on Neighborhoods." Patrick Doyle of Rolling Stone viewed it as musically interesting, highlighting the mix of electronic and acoustic on "Boxing Day". Several critics, including those from Billboard and Complex, have called the release underrated. Other reviewers, including those from Consequence, found the record uninspired or toothless.

Retrospective reviews remain positive. Bobby Olivier, writing for Billboard in 2022, considered the EP standout material: "Blink was at its least culturally relevant [...] but they released some really great tunes." Arielle Gordon in Pitchfork termed the EP "surprisingly affecting." In 2023, on the eve of the release of the band's ninth album One More Time..., Yang-Yi Goh of GQ devoted an article to praising the EP, which he felt "easily ranks as the most overlooked and underrated entry in the band’s discography [...] Dogs Eating Dogs painted an exhilarating new way forward for Blink—and then the band fell apart a couple years later and it never fully came to fruition."

== Track listing ==
All tracks are written by Mark Hoppus, Tom DeLonge, and Travis Barker, except "Pretty Little Girl" written by Hoppus, DeLonge, Barker, and Michael Atha.

No.	Title	Lead vocals	Length
1.	"When I Was Young"	DeLonge	3:28
2.	"Dogs Eating Dogs"	Hoppus/DeLonge	3:30
3.	"Disaster"	DeLonge/Hoppus	3:42
4.	"Boxing Day"	DeLonge/Hoppus	3:58
5.	"Pretty Little Girl" (featuring Yelawolf)	DeLonge/Atha	4:20
Total length:			19:00

== Personnel ==
Credits adapted from Apple Music.

Blink-182

- Mark Hoppus – bass, vocals, producer
- Tom DeLonge – guitars, vocals, synthesizers, producer
- Travis Barker – drums, percussion, keyboards, synthesizers, producer

Production

- Chris Holmes – co-producer
- Aaron Rubin – engineer
- Tom Lord-Alge – mixing
- Franco Vescovi – cover artwork

Additional musicians

- Yelawolf – vocals on "Pretty Little Girl"

== Chart performance ==
Chart (2013)	Peak position
Canadian Albums (Billboard)	21
US Billboard 200	23
US Top Alternative Albums (Billboard)	2
US Top Rock Albums (Billboard)	5
US Digital Albums (Billboard)	3
