= 2000s in the music industry =

In the first decade of the 21st century, the rise of digital media on the internet and computers as a central and primary means to record, distribute, store, and play music caused widespread economic changes in the music industry. The rise of digital media with high-speed internet access fundamentally changed the relationships between artists, record companies, promoters, retail music stores, the technology industry, and consumers. The rise of digital music consumption options contributed to several fundamental changes in consumption. One significant change in the music industry was the remarkable decline of conventional album sales on CD and vinyl. With the à la carte sales models increasing in popularity, consumers no longer downloaded entire albums but rather chose single songs.

The initial stage (from approximately 1998 to 2001) of the digital music revolution was the emergence of peer-to-peer (P2P) networks that allowed the free exchange of music files (such as Kazaa and Napster). By 2001, the cost of hard drive space had dropped to a level that allowed pocket-sized computers to store large libraries of music. The iPod and iTunes system for music storage and playback became immensely popular, and many consumers began to transfer their physical recording media (such as CDs) onto computer hard drives. The iTunes Music Store offered legal downloads beginning in 2003, and competitors soon followed, offering a variety of online music services, such as internet radio. Digital music distribution was aided by the widespread acceptance of broadband in the middle of the decade. At the same time, recording software (such as Avid's Pro Tools) began to be used almost exclusively to make records, rendering expensive multitrack tape machines (such as the 1967 Studer) almost obsolete.

The chief economic impact of these changes was a dramatic decline in revenues from recorded music. In the 21st century, consumers spent far less money on recorded music than they had in 1990s, in all formats. Total revenues for CDs, vinyl, cassettes and digital downloads in the U.S. dropped from a high of $14.6 billion in 1999 to $9 billion in 2008. The popularity of internet music distribution had increased and by 2007 more units were sold over the internet than in any other form. However, as The Economist reported, "paid digital downloads grew rapidly, but did not begin to make up for the loss of revenue from CDs." The 2000s period stands in stark contrast from the "CD boom" of 1984–1995, when profit margins averaged above 30% and industry executives were notorious for their high profile, even frivolous spending. The major record labels consistently failed to heed warnings or to support any measures that embraced the change in technology. In the early years of the decade, the industry fought illegal file sharing, successfully shutting down Napster in 2001 and threatening thousands of individuals with legal action. This failed to slow the decline in revenue and was a public relations disaster. Some academic studies had even suggested that downloads were not the true cause of the decline.

The turmoil in the industry changed the balance of power among all the various players. The major music-only stores such as Tower Records (which once wielded considerable influence in the industry) went bankrupt in 2006, replaced by box stores (such as Wal-Mart and Best Buy). Recording artists began to rely primarily on live performances and merchandise for their income, which in turn made them more dependent on music promoters such as Live Nation (which dominates tour promotion and owns a large number of music venues.) In order to benefit from all of an artist's income streams, record companies began to rely on the "360 deal", a new business relationship pioneered by Robbie Williams and EMI in 2007. At the other extreme, record companies also used simple manufacturing and distribution deals, which gives a higher percentage to the artist, but does not cover the expense of marketing and promotion. Many newer artists no longer see any kind of "record deal" as an integral part of their business plan at all. Inexpensive recording hardware and software made it possible to create high quality music in a bedroom and distribute it over the internet to a worldwide audience. This, in turn, caused problems for recording studios, record producers and audio engineers: the Los Angeles Times reported that, by 2009, as many as half of the recording facilities in that city had failed. Consumers benefited enormously from the ease with which music can be shared from computer to computer, whether over the internet or by the exchange of physical CDs. This has given consumers unparalleled choice in music consumption and has opened up performers to niche markets to which they previously had little access. According to a Nielsen and Billboard report, in 2012 digital music sales topped the physical sale of music.

== Industry Finances ==
Year	Record sales (Retail values in billions USD)				US Shipment Value (at Suggested List Price in millions USD)		US Physical Shipment Value (at Suggested List Price in millions USD)	
Year	Worldwide		US		US Shipment Value (at Suggested List Price in millions USD)		US Physical Shipment Value (at Suggested List Price in millions USD)	
Year	Sales	Change	Sales	Change	Volume	Change	Volume	Change
1999					14,584.5		13,048.0	
2000	36.7		14.0		14,323.0	▼1.79%	12,705.0	▼2.63%
2001	33.7	▼8.7%	13.4	▼4.3%	13,740.9	▼4.06%	12,388.8	▼2.49%
2002	32.2	▼4.5%	12.6	▼6.0%	12,614.2	▼8.20%	11,549.0	▼6.78%
2003	32.0	▼0.6%	11.8	▼6.3%	11,854.4	▼6.02%	11,053.4	▼4.29%
2004	33.6	▼5.0%	12.2	▲3.4%	12,345.0	▲4.14%	11,423.0	▲3.34%
2005	33.5	▼0.3%	12.3	▲0.8%	12,296.9	▼0.39%	10,477.5	▼8.28%
2006	31.8	▼5.1%	11.5	▼6.5%	11,758.2	▼4.38%	9,269.7	▼11.53%
2007	29.9	▼6.0%	10.4	▼9.6%	10,372.1	▼11.79%	7,495.3	▼19.14%
2008					8,768.4	▼15.46%	5,474.3	▼26.96%
2009			6.3		7,683.9	▼12.37%	4,376.1	▼20.06%
2010					6,995.0	▼8.97%	3,438.7	▼23.48%
2011					7,007.7	▲0.18%	3,170.9	▼5.31%
Total for period (adj. for inflation)	▼19.0% ( ▼32.1% )		▼25.7% ( ▼37.7% )		▼52.0% ( ▼ ? ) (using CPI)		▼75.70%	

Record sales
Table is a meta-analysis of eight IFPI annual reports
In 2008, 123m physical albums were sold in the UK, compared with 131m in 2007 and 151m in 2006. At an average price of £7.72, CDs were more than 25% cheaper in 2008 than in 2000.

Manufacture Shipments
The figures below (in millions) indicate the overall size of the U.S. sound recording industry based on manufacturers' shipments at suggested list prices.

Record stores
The transition from CDs to digital downloads has been shrinking the record industry most of the decade, leading to mass layoffs, and artist-roster cuts at major labels. In the USA the number of sold CDs dropped from 942.5 thousands in 2000 to 240.8 thousands in 2011. Approximately 2,680 record stores closed in the U.S. between 2005 and early 2009. In the UK, all the national specialist music retailers have collapsed except for HMV, a variety retailer that was once the UK's largest music retailer.

	1999	2000	2001	2002	2003	2004	2005	2006	2007	2008	
Consumers purchasing at record stores	44.5	42.4	42.5	36.8	33.2	32.5	39.4	35.4	31.1	30.0	%

== Peer-to-peer (P2P) downloading ==
=== Dawn of P2P: Napster ===
Napster was an online music file sharing service created by Shawn Fanning while he was attending Northeastern University in Boston and operating between June 1999 and July 2001. Its technology allowed people to easily copy and distribute MP3 files among each other, bypassing the established market for such songs and thus leading to the music industry's accusations of massive copyright violations.

The first peer-to-peer case was A&M Records, Inc. v. Napster, Inc., 239 F.3d 1004 (9th Cir. 2001). The court found that Napster was contributory liable for the copyright infringement of its end-users because it "knowingly encourages and assists the infringement of plaintiffs' copyrights." Although the original service was shut down by court order, it paved the way for larger decentralized peer-to-peer file-distribution programs such as Kazaa, Morpheus, Grokster, iMesh, and Limewire, which have been much harder to control because they practice more technically and legally creative approaches.

=== File sharing and its effects ===
A number of studies have found that file sharing has a negative impact on record sales. Examples of such studies include three papers published in the April 2006 issue of the Journal of Law and Economics (Liebowitz, Rob and Waldfogel, Zentner). Alejandro Zentner notes in another paper published in 2005, that music sales had globally dropped from approximately $38 billion in 1999 to $32 billion in 2003, and that this downward trend coincides with the advent of Napster in June 1999. Using aggregate data Stan J. Liebowitz argues in a series of papers (2005, 2012) that file sharing had a significant negative impact on record sales.

In March 2007, The Wall Street Journal found that CD sales had dropped 20 percent in one year, which it interpreted as the latest sign of the shift in the way people acquire their music. BigChampagne LLC has reported that around one billion songs a month were being traded on illegal file-sharing networks. As a result of this decline in CD sales, a significant amount of record stores were going out of business and "...making it harder for consumers to find and purchase older titles in stores". On 19 December 2008, The Wall Street Journal reported the following:

After years of suing thousands of people for allegedly stealing music via the Internet, the recording industry dropped its legal assault as it searches for more effective ways to combat online music piracy. The decision represented an abrupt shift of strategy for the industry, which had opened legal proceedings against about 35,000 people since 2003. Critics say the legal offensive ultimately did little to stem the tide of illegally downloaded music. And it created a public-relations disaster for the industry, whose lawsuits targeted, among others, several single mothers, a dead person and a 13-year-old girl. Instead, the Recording Industry Association of America said it plans to try an approach that relies on the cooperation of Internet-service providers.

== Digital business models ==
With the explosion of formats and the creation of legitimate digital content, the IFPI observed that three main business models had risen to dominance. They are a-la-carte, subscription service, and advertisement-based.

=== A-la-carte (Download Store) ===
A-la-carte is a service that sells individual songs, typically for $0.99 and now $1.29. They are known to consumers as "Download Stores". The leading provider is iTunes Store (Apple Inc.), who surpassed Wal-Mart to become the US's largest music retailer in April 2008. Sector leaders include:

- iTunes Store
- Amazon.com
- 7digital
- EMusic
- TuneTribe

Many hundreds more stores operate worldwide, often prominent only in particular countries or specialist genres. A third kind of operator never retails directly to the public, instead offering branded whitelabel stores and portals for organisations including bricks-and-mortar music stores, mobile telephony operators and ISPs.

Some services which initially only offered streaming of tracks now also offer a-la-carte downloads, either through third parties (e.g. Spotify) or fully integrated (Deezer, Juno Digital, Rhapsody etc.).

In 2009 Rolling Stone reported a price war between iTunes and Amazon MP3. Bill Carr, vice president of digital media for Amazon.com mentioned the following of digital music "one of the great benefits of the digital business versus the CD business is that we can experiment with price changes for an hour, a day or however long we like, with no impact on inventory".

=== Subscription service ===
A subscription service offers the consumer unlimited downloads for a monthly fee. This approach, according to the Open Music Model, is theorized to maximize revenues in the long run. The sector leader was Napster, which costed $12.95/month and offered 6 million downloads and a $5 a month program. Napster's net revenue for the quarter ending on 30 June 2008 was $30.3 million. Sector leaders included:

- Napster
- Rhapsody

=== Advertisement-based service ===
Advertisement-based services offer music free of charge to the consumer, while funding is derived from advertisement. The model is widespread as seen by the success of AOL Music, Yahoo Music and YouTube (multimedia provider). Many of these services are internet radio stations, as they offer continuous streaming music, while others are not continuously streaming. Many of these services offer multimedia or additional services. For example, MySpace (owned by Fox Interactive Media) offers social-networking as its flagship service. comScore reports the top 10 in internet radio viewership in the United States:

	Unique Visitors (000)		
	July '07	July '08	% Change
Total Internet: Total Audience	180,078	189,134	▲5
AOL Music	15,284	23,884	▲56
Yahoo Music	23,075	18,725	▼-19
Clear Channel Online	10,697	9,394	▼-12
Pandora Radio	2,551	4,834	▲89
Interactive One	512	3,515	▲587
CBS Radio	3,469	3,240	▼-7
NPR.ORG	1,717	2,538	▲48
Citadel Broadcasting Corporation	1,373	1,885	▲37
Batanga.com	1,239	1,810	▲46
Disney Music	1,721	1,598	▼ -7

Other sector players:

- YouTube
- MySpace

See also List of Internet radio stations

YouTube (owned by Google Inc.) is the premier site for finding music videos for both independent bands and mainstream bands that have released their music on CD or digitally, while also being useful for finding rare songs. YouTube is a multimedia provider, so it is difficult to say how much entertainment it has provided to music consumers, however it did provide about one-third of all 11 billion online video views in the US in the month of April 2008.

The site was also testing three new landing pages dedicated to the popular categories of news, movies, and music. Each page will be populated with the most popular content on the site related to that category. Some had even hailed YouTube as being the "digital successor to MTV" as they seem to be positioning themselves in that manner. They had mixed relations with labels as evidenced by their icy relationship with Warner Music Group but more optimistic relationship with Universal Music.

MySpace (owned by Fox Interactive Media) was also a key player and Rolling Stone reports that it hosts more than 70 million users monthly and that "visitors to the site can hear both Bob Dylan's or The White Stripes' entire catalogue". Unlike many services, MySpace has been successful in making copyright deals with the RIAA's "Big Four", which is Sony BMG, Warner Music Group, Universal Music and EMI, in September 2008. In January 2009, MySpace made partnerships with the following independent labels: Nettwerk, INgrooves, Iris Distribution, RoyaltyShare, and Wind-up Entertainment. In March 2009, CNET News reported that there were more than 5 million bands with music on the streaming-and-discovery music service, and more than 100 million playlists had been created.

Pandora Internet Radio is distinctive from both YouTube and MySpace in that it offers consumers continuously streaming media rather than non-continuous music, which makes it highly similar to terrestrial radio or television. However, it can be contrasted with radio in that it offers music recommendation. YouTube is similar to Pandora in that it also offers recommendation, but is distinct in that content is user-generated.

A new type of service that had also become popular was sites that allow consumers to pay what they wish or pay by advertising on social networking sites. Sites like NoiseTrade.com and comeandlive.com are examples of sites that sponsor artists and allow users to download music in exchange for advertising for the artist. Music was essentially free to users essentially costing only the time it takes to post information about the artist downloaded on Facebook, Twitter, or email. Another example was the release of the Radiohead album In Rainbows in which users could download the album and name their own price. The idea of pay what you want music consumption was new, but catching on with users and growing.

== Format issues ==
=== Decline of analog, rise of digital ===
This trend has broader implications in the use of formats. It has been a trend in music, television, movies, and print. The Recording Industry Association of America (RIAA) reported data on the music industry's sales by format over the ten-year period from 1998 until 2007. The data in the table below is from the 2007 report.

Format Market share

	1998	1999	2000	2001	2002	2003	2004	2005	2006	2007	10-Year Change	4-Year Change
Full-length CDs	74.8	83.2	89.3	89.2	90.5	87.8	90.3	87.0	85.6	82.6	▲7.8	▼ -7.7
Full-length cassettes	14.8	8.0	4.9	3.4	2.4	2.2	1.7	1.1	0.8	0.3	▼ -14.5	▼ -1.4
Singles (all types)	6.8	5.4	2.5	2.4	1.9	2.4	2.4	2.7	3.4	2.4	▼ -4.4	0
Music videos/Video DVDs	1.0	0.9	0.8	1.1	0.7	0.6	1.0	0.7	1.1	0.4	▼ -0.6	▼ -0.6
DVD audio	NA	NA	NA	1.1	1.3	2.7	1.7	0.8	1.3	1.2	▲1.2	▼ -0.5
Digital Download	NA	NA	NA	0.2	0.5	1.3	0.9	5.7	6.7	11.2	▲11.2	▲10.3
SACD	NA	NA	NA	NA	NA	0.5	0.8	1.2	0.0	0.6	▲0.6	▼ -0.2
Vinyl LPs	0.7	0.5	0.5	0.6	0.7	0.5	0.9	0.7	0.6	0.7	0	▼ -0.2

Note: These figures represent data collected only from RIAA member labels, which constitutes only a portion of total online music exchanged.

Statistical analysis suggests the large-scale change in distribution:

- Full-length CD distribution (by percentage of total music revenue) peaked in 2004.
- Between 2004 and 2007, Full-length CD sales have experienced a linear decline of around 2% annually. During this time period, Digital Download has increased from 0.9% to 11.2%.
- Of the over 10% of total market growth taken by Digital Download, roughly 8% came from losses in Full-length CD sales.
- Full-length cassettes experienced the most loss (-14.5% market share) in the 10-Year period, although most of the loss (-13.1%) was experienced from 1998 to 2003. In 2007, they were outsold by Vinyl.
- As of 2007, only two formats had greater than 10% of the market: Full-length CDs and Digital Download.
- The ratio of digital to analog sales in 2004 it was roughly 1:99, but by 2007 it was roughly 1:9.

In 2008, physical album sales fell 20 percent to 362.6 million from 450.5 million, while digital album sales rose 32 percent to a record 65.8 million units.

	1998	1999	2000	2001	2002	2003	2004	2005	2006	2007	
Record Store	44.5	42.4	42.5	36.8	33.2	32.5	39.4	35.4	31.1	30.0	%
Other Store	38.3	40.8	42.4	50.7	52.8	53.8	32.0	32.7	29.7	28.4	%
Record Club	7.9	7.6	6.1	4.0	4.1	4.4	8.5	10.5	12.6	7.2	%
TV, Newspaper, Magazine Ad Or 800 Number	2.5	2.4	3.0	2.0	1.5	1.7	2.4	2.4	1.7	1.8	%
Internet	2.4	3.2	2.9	3.4	5.0	5.9	8.2	9.1	10.9	14.6	%
Digital Download	NA	NA	NA	NA	NA	NA	6.0	6.8	12.0	13.5	%
Concert	NA	NA	NA	NA	NA	1.6	2.7	2.0	1.5	3.0	%

=== Proliferation of formats ===
The advent of digital media has led to the sudden creation of many new music formats available to the average consumer. In 2003 there were less than 10 formats available, but by 2007 there were over 100. Today a single artist release can be packaged in multiple formats including video downloads, ringtones or mobile full tracks. As the International Federation of the Phonographic Industry (IFPI) notes:

In 2003, music distribution formats were numbered in single figures – today, they number in the hundreds...In the digital era, record companies are licensing music across a multitude of platforms, in scores of different formats and with hundreds of different partners.

== Mobile music ==
=== MP3 players ===
Rise of MP3 players, which are consumer electronics devices that stores, organizes and plays audio files. Some DAPs (digital audio players) are also referred to as portable media players as they have image-viewing and/or video-playing support. The first mass-produced DAP was created in 1997 by SaeHan Information Systems, which domestically sold its "MPMan" player in the middle of 1998. In October 2001, Apple Computer (now known as Apple Inc.) unveiled the first generation iPod, the 5 GB hard drive based DAP with a 1.8" Toshiba drive. With the development of a minimalistic user interface and a smaller form factor, the iPod was initially notable within users of the Macintosh community. In July 2002, Apple introduced the second generation update to the iPod. It was compatible with Windows computers through Musicmatch Jukebox (now known as Y!Music Musicmatch Jukebox). The iPod series, which grew to include microdrive and flash-based players, has become the market leader in DAPs.

=== Smartphones ===
The 21st century saw the birth of 3G enabled mobile phones, which enables network operators to offer users a wider range of more advanced services while achieving greater network capacity through improved spectral efficiency.

The key advantage of 3G enabled phones over MP3 players was their greater web integration. This enables users to readily access a far larger quantity of songs than MP3 player users can. For an MP3 player, songs must be stored before the user leaves their computer, but with 3G enabled phones the device is not separated from the source. In 2009, it was projected that revenue from mobile media and entertainment (MME) services in the US would more than double by 2014.

== Consumer Genre Preferences in the U.S. ==
Genre	1999	2000	2001	2002	2003	2004	2005	2006	2007	2008	
Rock	25.2	24.8	24.4	24.7	25.2	23.9	31.5	34.0	32.4	31.8	%
Rap/Hip-hop	10.8	12.9	11.4	13.8	13.3	12.1	13.3	11.4	10.8	10.7	%
R&B/Urban	10.5	9.7	10.6	11.2	10.6	11.3	10.2	11.0	11.8	10.2	%
Country	10.8	10.7	10.5	10.7	10.4	13.0	12.5	13.0	11.5	11.9	%
Pop	10.3	11.0	12.1	9.0	8.9	10.0	8.1	7.1	10.7	9.1	%
Religious	5.1	4.8	6.7	6.7	5.8	6.0	5.3	5.5	3.9	6.5	%
Classical	3.5	2.7	3.2	3.1	3.0	2.0	2.4	1.9	2.3	1.9	%
Jazz	3.0	2.9	3.4	3.2	2.9	2.7	1.8	2.0	2.6	1.1	%
Soundtracks	0.8	0.7	1.4	1.1	1.4	1.1	0.9	0.8	0.8	0.8	%
Oldies	0.7	0.9	0.8	0.9	1.3	1.4	1.1	1.1	0.4	0.7	%
New Age	0.5	0.5	1.0	0.5	0.5	1.0	0.4	0.3	0.3	0.6	%
Children's	0.4	0.6	0.5	0.4	0.6	2.8	2.3	2.9	2.9	3.0	%
Other	9.1	8.3	7.9	8.1	7.6	8.9	8.5	7.3	7.1	9.1	%

== Other noteworthy developments ==
=== In the courtroom ===
- On 19 December 2008, the RIAA announced that it would stop suing file sharers, because the strategy was not working to stop the flow of illegal downloads. Instead, the RIAA tried to work with ISPs to prevent P2P piracy. "The decision represents an abrupt shift of strategy for the industry, which has opened legal proceedings against about 35,000 people since 2003".
- On 18 June 2009 CNET News reported Jammie Thomas-Rasset was found guilty of willful copyright infringement in a Minneapolis federal court and must pay the recording industry $1.92 million. This legal battle, Capitol Records, Inc. v. Thomas-Rasset, marked the first time the recording industry has argued a file-sharing case before a jury.
- In France, a new law regarding illegal downloading, called HADOPI, is being debated. If passed, it would force the Internet provider to shut down the subscription while still receiving monthly payment. This double punishment is highly criticized.

=== In politics ===
- On 5 January 2009, President-elect Barack Obama appointed Thomas J. Perrelli to the position of United States Associate Attorney General. Perrelli represented the RIAA in a slew of cases, including a high-profile bid to unmask file sharers without the requirement of a judge reviewing the evidence first. Obama's selection of Joe Biden as vice president showed that the presidential hopeful was comfortable with someone with firmly pro-RIAA views. Biden urged the criminal prosecutions of copyright-infringing peer-to-peer users and tried to create a new federal felony involving playing unauthorized music.

=== In video games ===
- In the video game industry, the music category overtook the sports category as no. 2 top category in sales, behind action. 58 percent of players played music games, second only to 65 percent who played action games. About 50 percent played sports games, down from 55 percent in 2007 and 62 percent in 2005. The video game industry was worth $22 billion in 2008.
- Guitar Hero III: Legends of Rock, which launched in 2007, had become the first single game to surpass $1 billion in sales. The announcement came during a CES keynote by Activision Publishing CEO, Mike Griffith, and follows an announcement that the entire franchise had broken the same mark a year ago. Griffith said that Guitar Hero's monumental success had trickled down to other industries, most especially the struggling music industry. According to Griffith, sales of everything connected to Guitar Hero, from music to real guitars, had gone up.

== See also ==
- 2010s in the music industry
- Comparison of online music stores
- Digital rights management
- File Sharing
- Loudness war
- Music in the 2000s
- Online music stores
- Satellite Radio
- User-generated content
