= 2010s in the music industry =

During the 2010s, consumer technology expanded upon the foundations established in the previous decade. Personal computing functions broadened beyond traditional desktop computers to include mobile devices such as smartphones, tablets, and smartwatches. Increased computing capacity and device portability influenced how music was created, distributed, and consumed.

Digital music distribution is still the primary form of music consumption, with three main business models dominating the scene: subscription-based services, a-la-carte, and advertisement-based services (see 2000s in the music industry).

== Digital music distributors ==
There are currently five big players in the digital music distribution space: Spotify, Apple Inc, YouTube, Tidal, and Amazon (in order of number of users).

=== Spotify ===
Launched out of Sweden in 2008, Spotify has become the leader of subscription-based digital music consumption with 40 million subscribers worldwide. They have a database of over 8 million songs and offer accessibility via a web, desktop, and mobile application. Spotify currently employs over 1,600 employees and operates as a private organization.

=== Apple Inc ===
==== iTunes Music Store ====
Launched in 2003, the iTunes Music Store was the global leader in a-la-carte digital music downloads as of 2012, with over 26 million songs being offered in their database.

Business model: a-la-carte downloads.

==== Apple Music ====
Apple Inc. responded to the increasing demand for subscription-based streaming services (evident by Spotify's success) in June 2015, with the release of Apple Music. Operating in over 100 countries, Apple music offers users their own take on 24/7 radio stations and music suggestions: and "for you" and "new" tab managed by talented music experts.

Business model: subscription-based streaming.

=== YouTube ===
Launched in November 2015, YouTube Music is an app that allows users to search through their database of over 30 million audio tracks. But YouTube is also unique because it offers a breadth of concert footage/audio.

Pricing: The app is free, but has advertisements. For a price, users can subscribe to YouTube Red, which removes ads and adds offline access to the My Mix playlist. The latter incorporates both tracks the user has listened to and new suggestions.

Business model: advertisement/subscription-based streaming.

=== Tidal ===
Originally launched in 2014, Tidal was founded from Norwegian/Swedish public company Aspiro. In 2015, Jay-Z acquired Aspiro and rebranded Tidal, stating that it was the first digital music streaming service by artists; in 2015 Tidal held a press conference where sixteen big-name music artists (like Daft Punk, Kanye West, Madonna) announced that they were partial owners, and held a stake in Tidal. Tidal currently claims to have 42 million paying subscribers.

Business model: subscription-based streaming.

=== Amazon ===
Launched as a beta in 2007, Amazon Music is a digital music streaming service that combines the a-la-carte and subscription based payment models; users can download or stream songs. Included with an Amazon prime membership, the Amazon Music catalog currently consists of 29,157,740 songs.

Pricing: Amazon Prime subscribers are given access to part of the music library, and can unlock full access by paying a fee. Non Amazon-Prime users pay a higher fee, and there is a lower fee for users who exclusively listen through Amazon's Echo speaker.

Business model: subscription-based streaming + a-la-carte downloads.

== Exclusive releases ==
The music industry has seen a consistent decline in album sales due to the rising popularity of streaming services. As a result, music superstars tried a new method for increasing album profits: exclusively releasing their music on a specific digital music distributor. 2016 saw exclusive album releases from music superstars such as Drake, Kanye West, Frank Ocean, Beyoncé, Rihanna, Future & Coldplay. Drake release Views was exclusively released on Apple Music and set a first-week streaming record at 250 million times worldwide, in addition to 1 million albums sold – breaking Justin Bieber's streaming record of 205 million times within the album Purpose's first week of release on Spotify (which had 5 times the subscribers as Apple Music).

On the business side, exclusive releases can help digital music conglomerates attract a significant number on new subscribers (depending on the artist) as well as free promotion for the firm. On the other side of the equation, the artist is paid a nominal fee in addition to the streaming revenue.

Exclusive streaming may be on the way out just as quickly as it appeared. Record labels have begun to realize that exclusively releasing through one or two streaming services could stunt the long-term growth in subscription music. The upfront fee may be enticing to struggling labels in the short term, but may hurt their overall sales and streaming while the streaming services themselves benefit much more from the PR, new users, and streaming itself.

Following Frank Ocean's exclusive release of his album Blonde, Lucian Grainge, CEO of Universal Music Group, banned exclusive distribution with streaming services by UMG artists.

== Remote music collaboration ==
With the advent of technology (and the digitalization of music recording and distribution), more musicians have started to collaborate online as a method for overcoming the physical distance between artists. The music industry has seen more remote music collaboration on the recording side of music in particular; the standard for recording music is digital, and individual audio tracks are easily transferable over the web. Some people prefer analog recording as a way of capturing a specific timbre, but such tracks can still be digitized and shared the same way.

=== Applications ===
Remote music collaboration has also created new possibilities on both the performance, and educational side of the music industry. In 2016 there were two desktop applications available for the digital musician: LOLA and Ultragrid.

1. LOLA (standing for low-latency) operates strictly on Window's PCs, and utilizes a low-latency sound adopter for sounds around 6ms. Musician Institutes all around the world have begun to utilize LOLA as way of enabling musicians in different locations, to play music together in real-time.
2. Ultragrid is an open source application that operates on Mac, PC, and Linux operating systems, with a focus in the transmission of HD audio and video streams in order to enable live, cyber performances.

A 2016 study looked into the efficiency of LOLA and Ultragrid for remote music collaboration. The study concluded that a delay between 15ms and 30ms is necessary in order to play music together, remotely. The research also found the following metrics to be important for live, remote music collaboration: quality of sound capture & reproduction, volume, dynamics, space, and echo.
