= After Midnight (Blink-182 song) =

Single by Blink-182

from the album Neighborhoods
- Released: September 6, 2011
- Recorded: April–July 2011
- Studio: Opra Music Studios, Los Angeles; Henson Studios, Los Angeles; Neverpants Ranch, San Diego
- Length: 3:25
- Label: Interscope
- Songwriters: Tom DeLonge, Mark Hoppus, Travis Barker
- Producers: Tom DeLonge, Mark Hoppus, Travis Barker

Blink-182 singles chronology
"Up All Night" (2011)	"After Midnight" (2011)	"Bored to Death" (2016)

"After Midnight" is a song by American rock band Blink-182, released on September 6, 2011 as the second single from the group's sixth studio album, Neighborhoods (2011). The song was written and produced very late in the recording process for Neighborhoods, following the cancellation of a European tour to complete the long-delayed album. Although the album was recorded primarily in separate studios, "After Midnight" came together quickly in a last-minute writing session when the trio were together.

The song originated from drummer Travis Barker, who laid down the song's distinctive percussion and labeled it "Travis Beat". Guitarist Tom DeLonge and bassist Mark Hoppus were immediately inspired when Barker introduced the demo to them, and the song was nearly complete three hours later. While Hoppus and DeLonge wrote the track separately, both centered lyrically on romance. Lyrically, the song revolves around two broken individuals who fall in love. "After Midnight" is a midtempo song.

The song received generally positive reviews from contemporary music critics, many of whom viewed it among the band's best work. The music video for "After Midnight", directed by Isaac Rentz, was released in January 2012. It combines a narrative following lovers sneaking around a youth psychiatric ward and performance shots of the band performing in a large hangar. "After Midnight" peaked at number seven on the US Billboard's Alternative Songs chart, and also within the top 20 on Canadian rock charts. In promotion of the single, Blink-182 performed the song live on late-night talk show Conan.

It was the last single to feature founding member Tom DeLonge until his return to the band in 2022.

== Background ==
In 2009, Blink-182 reunited after a four-year hiatus and began recording their sixth studio album, Neighborhoods. The band's studio autonomy, tours, managers and personal projects stalled the recording process, which lasted from shortly after the band's February 2009 reunion to July 2011. The band developed Neighborhoods in separate studios and regrouped at various periods to record. The band's numerous delays in the recording process resulted in the band canceling a European tour and the label setting a deadline for the album to be due.

"After Midnight" was one of four new songs birthed from a last-minute writing session after the band canceled their European tour in April 2011. The song originated from an idea by drummer Travis Barker, and the song was initially titled "Travis Beat". When the trio first listened to the beat, DeLonge and Hoppus both had ideas immediately. "It was one of those moments on the album where everybody just had a bunch of ideas all at once, and it came together pretty quickly," said Hoppus. Within "two or three hours," the song's structure was near completion.

DeLonge and Hoppus split lyrical duties and worked separately, and both wrote about romance. DeLonge recalled Barker mentioning that Neighborhoods should contain a song in a similar vein to "I Miss You", the band's 2004 single. With this in mind, DeLonge included references to "I Miss You", "Always" and "All of This", all tracks from the band's previous effort: "I can't find the best in all of this / but I'm always looking out for you / 'Cause you're the one I miss." DeLonge viewed the song's speedy creation as just one of many similarities to their back catalog: "What's cool about this song and 'I Miss You,' when Mark and I both write lyrics in different places, they come together and they're both about the same thing, usually me and him kissing and making love to each other," he joked. "We end up writing super romantic songs. And I think it worked out really good on this one."

== Composition ==
"After Midnight" is a mid tempo anthem that was written about "damaged people who fall in love." The song is written in the key of A major and follows a tempo of 84 beats per minute.

== Release ==
Mark Hoppus made an announcement via Twitter and on Blink-182's Facebook that a new song of the album called "After Midnight" would debut on Radio 1 for England and on the official web page for the rest of the world. It premiered on the Zane Lowe's program on September 6 at 7:45 pm. The same day the band launched a minigame on a web page called get182.com, and consisted to get the number 182 to download the song. "After Midnight" was played for the first time on the Honda Civic Tour along with "Ghost On The Dance Floor" before the release of the album. The band also performed the song on Jimmy Kimmel Live! on October 3, 2011, and on Conan on December 8, 2011. The song impacted radio on October 18, 2011.

== Reception ==
=== Commercial performance ===
"After Midnight" was commercially successful in North America. In the United States, "After Midnight" debuted at number 88 on the Hot 100 on October 15, 2011. On October 22, the song debuted at number 39 on the Billboard Alternative Songs chart, later peaking at number seven and spending 20 weeks on the chart. On Billboard's Hot Rock Songs chart, the song also spent 20 weeks, peaking at number 20. On the Rock Digital Songs chart, which ranks top-downloaded rock songs, the song peaked at number seven.

In Canada, the song peaked at number 16 on the Active Rock chart on January 24, 2012.

=== Critical response ===
The song's music video depicts two mental patients escaping and falling in love.

The song received positive feedback from music critics, with some of them cataloging it as one of their best songs. Tom Goodwyn from the British magazine NME said that this song is one of the best from this album, a lovely subtle love song and the lightest moment on Neighborhoods. "We'll stagger home after midnight, sleep arm in arm in the stairwell" croons Mark Hoppus over a gentle riff. Whoever fancies themselves as the new John Hughes should be locking this down for the big kissing scene at the end of their new flick now. Consequence of Sound's web critic Chris Coplan said the song is "decidedly epic with an intimate touch, an effort that highlights each member’s strengths, Tom DeLonge’s romantic verses, Mark Hoppus’ grand chorus, and Travis Barker’s bangin’ drum skills, to make for one fairly anthemic effort". SPIN's critic Marc Hogan said: "It's a bittersweet midtempo rocker, and the most contemplative of the new songs Blink has unveiled so far. 'These nights go on and on' goes the chorus, perfect for bored teenagers shouting outside car windows". Thomas Nassiff from AbsolutePunk said: "After Midnight" is instantly a classic Blink-182 song. Scott Heisel from the US magazine Alternative Press wrote: "Is one of the finest moments of Blink's career, a song so simple, catchy and geniune that it's amazing it took them nearly two decades to write it".

In contrast, Jody Rosen of Rolling Stone felt the track lacked "the sparkle and fizz of the best Blink," but nonetheless felt "comfortingly familiar."

== Music video ==
The music video for "After Midnight" was released on January 6, 2012. The clip revolves around a male (Garret Camilleri) and female (Valorie Curry) in a youth psychiatric ward who find one another and escape for an evening of reckless romance. The narrative is combined with pieces of the band performing in a large hangar. The band received 30 separate treatments from different directors from the band's lead that they "wanted something that was troubled." The band chose Isaac Rentz, who also shot the music video for the band's previous single, "Up All Night", based on his treatment. The performance clips were shot in the world's largest freestanding wooden structure, a hangar built in the 1940s to construct blimps. The clip was shot on November 30, 2011 in Tustin, California.

== Format and track listing ==
CD (2011)

1. "After Midnight" – 3:27

== Personnel ==
Blink-182

- Mark Hoppus – bass guitar, vocals, producer
- Tom DeLonge – guitars, vocals, producer
- Travis Barker – drums, producer

Production

- "Critter" – co-producer
- Paul Frye – assistant recording engineer
- Femio Hernández – assistant recording engineer
- Chris Holmes – co-producer
- James Ingram – recording engineer, additional engineering
- Paul LaMalfa – assistant recording engineer
- Tom Lord-Alge – mix engineer

== Charts ==
=== Weekly charts ===
Chart (2011–12)	Peak position
Canada Rock (Billboard)	31
Czech Republic Modern Rock (IFPI)	8
US Billboard Hot 100	88
US Alternative Airplay (Billboard)	7
US Hot Rock & Alternative Songs (Billboard)	20
US Rock Digital Songs (Billboard)	7

=== Year-end charts ===
Chart (2011)	Peak position
US Alternative Songs (Billboard)	37
US Rock Songs (Billboard)	68
