= Up All Night (Blink-182 song) =

Single by Blink-182

from the album Neighborhoods
- Released: July 14, 2011
- Recorded: April 2009–July 2011
- Studio: Opra Music Studios, Henson Studios (Los Angeles, California); Neverpants Ranch, (San Diego, California)
- Genre: Pop-punk; alternative rock
- Length: 3:20
- Label: Interscope
- Songwriters: Tom DeLonge, Mark Hoppus, Travis Barker
- Producers: Tom DeLonge, Mark Hoppus, Travis Barker

Blink-182 singles chronology
| "Not Now" (2005) | "Up All Night" (2011) | "After Midnight" (2011) |

"Up All Night" is a song by American rock band Blink-182, released on July 14, 2011 as the lead single from the group's sixth studio album, Neighborhoods (2011). The song was the band's first single following a four-year hiatus. It was the first song the trio created upon their reformation in February 2009. Although the band wanted to release the track as a digital single in July 2009, they quickly decided it was too ambitious to complete before their fall reunion tour. The track generally grew heavier over the course of two-year recording process.

The song premiered July 14, 2011, on Los Angeles radio station KROQ-FM and the band's official website. A digital single was released the following day. Critics received the song positively, with many favorably noting similarities with the band's side-projects. Two music videos were released for "Up All Night" in August 2011. The main video, directed by Isaac Rentz, features the band playing in a neighborhood during a reckless block party, and a second video features a montage compiled from fan-made YouTube videos that used the band's music illegally. Critics generally reacted to both videos favorably, with many media outlets covering the fan-made compilation.

== History ==
After the reunion at the 2009 Grammy Awards, Blink-182 began production on a new studio album. As the band got back together, drummer Travis Barker said that the trio immediately "got inspired" by practicing their old songs and listening to them again, and they decided to record demos. There were four demos done, and only one was near completion, called "Up All Night". The song was originally titled "The Night the Moon Was Gone", a name DeLonge's daughter, Ava, came up with. Quickly they realized that it was too ambitious to complete it before their reunion tour began in July.

When the band set off on tour, Tom DeLonge described the song as "almost finished." The band raised concerns that the song would debut to some fans as a bootleg-recorded version on sites such as YouTube, and opted to not release it: "It’s not so much that we were concerned that it was going to get played somewhere where we didn’t have control of it," said DeLonge. "We were just concerned that the first impressions weren’t going to be the beautiful hard work that we put into recording the song and the way we recorded it. The foundation of the song remains largely the same as when the band first began work on it in 2009, but as they recorded more songs, they kept coming back to "Up All Night", and the song became "harder and heavier than its original incarnation", according to Hoppus, "Initially the chorus had much more air. It was a lofty, synth-y chorus, but we wanted the first song that people heard to be much more of a rocker." The band changed much of the song's instrumentation and wrote heavier guitar and bass parts, and DeLonge wrote the guitar progression for the chorus. Barker then began work on the drum portion of the song which, according to Hoppus "really solidified the rock element of the track. The half-time intro of the last section was all him, and I think punctuates the song very well."

Years later in his livestream watching the Untitled album documentary, Mark confirmed that the riff Tom played on the documentary was actually "Up All Night", along with another unreleased song called "Punk Kid".

== Composition ==
According to sheet music published at Musicnotes.com by Hal Leonard Corporation, "Up All Night" is written in common time in the key of A major with a tempo of 156 beats per minute.

Barker, in June 2009, called "Up All Night" a "logical step-forward" from the music found on the band's previous effort, Blink-182 (2003). Barker also hinted that when the band was able to get back together and record, that would be the direction they would take. He called the track "heavy," and added that it sounded like "if you mixed Box Car Racer and Blink." Hoppus commented, "'Up All Night' contains elements of everything the band has done, and pushes further than they've gone before."

== Release ==
"Up All Night" premiered on Blink-182's website and Los Angeles-based radio station KROQ-FM on July 14, 2011. Though originally scheduled to play on Friday at 7:30am, the song's premiere was moved earlier, to Thursday night. In response to the single release, the official Blink-182 website crashed several times, Hoppus' new Google+ account crashed, and Blink-182 was a top trending topic on Twitter worldwide.

== Reception ==
=== Commercial performance ===
"Up All Night" was commercially successful in North America. In the United States, the song debuted at number 65 on the Hot 100 on August 6, 2011. On September 3, the song debuted on the Billboard Alternative Songs chart, going on to peak at number 3, spending 20 weeks on the chart. On Billboard's Hot Rock Songs chart, the song also spent 20 weeks, peaking at number 6.

=== Critical response ===
Music critics were generally positive regarding the song. James Montgomery of MTV News called the track "a booming, skittering mix of beats, arena-rock and yes, maybe even a little indie," that recalled "perfectly" all of the members' various side-projects over the years, most prominently Blink-182 and the Box Car Racer song "Elevator". Billboard wrote that "The verse and bridge riffs retain their palm-muted glory, but the track's main riff is much heavier than anything in previous Blink singles." Vulture's Amons Barshad said that "Up All Night" is "still a bit of a curveball, just for not being the soothing pop-punk palliative you may have expected as the first comeback release. The verses have a spacey effect and bare bass line, familiar from early aughts single 'Feeling This,' but the verses shout out 'lies' and 'demons,' and the guitar parts keep on slipping into a stomping hardcore riff." Clark Collis of Entertainment Weekly called the song a "thunderous, midtempo rocker." Matthew Perpetua of Rolling Stone commented that the track "delivers the band's distinctive pop-punk hooks on a monumental, stadium-size scale," and, in a full review of the song, Rolling Stone's Monica Herrera summarized the song while giving it three and a half stars out of five: "Jagged riffs smash into warbled sci-fi synths, as DeLonge and bassist Mark Hoppus trade glum proverbs — 'Everyone lives to tell the tale of how we die alone someday,' Hoppus wails — before wrapping it all up in one neat wallop." The Boston Globe's Scott McLennan asserted the song boasts a "richer groove" than the songs from the band's Enema of the State or Dude Ranch records, stating "The song may be more mature in its thinking, but musically keeps to the model Blink-182 originally built." Jonah Bayer of Spin noted the song's "experimental guitar riffage and a quasi-ska drum beat," describing the lyricism "continu[ing] in the same progressive vein as their last album, 2003's Blink-182." John Benson from The Vindicator described the song as having "heavy hardcore-lite guitars and alt rock synths."

== Music videos ==
Blink-182 partnered with AT&T to release an unofficial music video for "Up All Night" August 2, 2011, a montage compiled from fan-made YouTube videos that used the band's music illegally. After an online search of over 14,000 videos, several were compiled to create the montage, presented as "The Blink-182 film festival you didn't know you entered". The video's description read "To launch our first single in eight years, AT&T helped us search YouTube for every instance of fans using our music without our permission. And then we rewarded them for it. This film is made out of clips from all those videos. Thanks for being a fan." Released August 2, 2011, it features skateboarders doing tricks and amateur musicians playing along to the band's songs. Devin Brown of CBS News compared the video to Radiohead's marketing strategy, in that the band "rewarded the illegal use of their music, and in turn promoted their new music. It's a smart move for the band that has been forcibly absent from the music scene since disbanding in 2005." Entertainment Weekly's Ashley Fetters said that it "functions as a tongue-in-cheek thank-you note to their generation-Napster fan base: It’s a wry, affectionate montage". Rolling Stone called it "silly and tongue-in-cheek, but pointed: If you think you're allowed to do whatever you want with their copyrighted works, they should be obliged to do the same with yours."

The official music video for "Up All Night" was filmed July 26, 2011. DeLonge stated that it would have a more serious tone in comparison to some of the band's more humorous videos of the past, saying "at this point in our career, what we're trying to do with this record and everything, it's not going to be totally the same as what people expected. But, old Blink videos, we had a lot of serious ones and we had a lot of funny ones. This one, I think, will be along the lines of being more serious". The video premiered August 26, 2011. The video was directed by Isaac Rentz and depicts a very erratic block party, notably devoid of adults, which then evolves into a violent confrontation reminiscent of the themes in "Lord of the Flies." Blink-182 debuted at number 21 on Billboard's Social 50 due to the buzz generated by the release of the video. The video accumulated over two million views in a matter of days. In total, the video release helped grow Blink-182's fanbase by 476,000 fans week-to-week.

== Charts ==
=== Weekly charts ===
| Chart (2011) | Peak position |
|---|---|
| Australia (ARIA) | 30 |
| Canada Hot 100 (Billboard) | 58 |
| Canada Rock (Billboard) | 13 |
| Czech Republic Modern Rock (IFPI) | 5 |
| Mexico Ingles Airplay (Billboard) | 46 |
| Scotland Singles (OCC) | 35 |
| UK Singles (OCC) | 48 |
| US Billboard Hot 100 | 65 |
| US Alternative Airplay (Billboard) | 3 |
| US Hot Rock & Alternative Songs (Billboard) | 6 |

=== Year-end charts ===
| Chart (2011) | Peak position |
|---|---|
| US Rock Songs (Billboard) | 37 |
