= Angels & Airwaves discography =

- Studio albums: 6
- Extended plays: 3
- Singles: 17
- Video albums: 2
- Music videos: 18
- Covers: 7
- Internet releases: 3

This is the discography of the American alternative rock band Angels & Airwaves.

== Albums ==
=== Studio albums ===
List of studio albums, with selected chart positions and certifications
Title	Album details	Peak chart positions										Certifications
Title	Album details	US	AUS	AUT	CAN	FRA	GER	IRL	NLD	NZ	UK	Certifications
We Don't Need to Whisper	Release date: May 23, 2006; Label: Geffen; Producer: Tom DeLonge	4	8	30	3	82	18	23	62	29	6	RIAA: Gold; BPI: Silver
I-Empire	Release date: November 6, 2007; Label: Geffen; Producer: Tom DeLonge	9	31	—	11	—	77	70	—	—	29	
Love	Release date: February 14, 2010; Label: Self-released; Producer: Tom DeLonge	67	80	67	—	—	54	—	—	—	—	
Love: Part Two	Release date: November 8, 2011; Label: To the Stars; Producer: Tom DeLonge	30	80	67	—	—	54	—	—	—	— (Note: Love: Part Two did not enter the UK Albums Chart, but peaked at number 90 on the UK Album Downloads Chart.)	
The Dream Walker	Release date: December 9, 2014; Label: To the Stars; Producer: Tom DeLonge, Aaron Rubin	39	—	—	—	—	—	—	—	—	94	
Lifeforms	Release date: September 24, 2021; Label: Rise; Producer: Tom DeLonge, Aaron Rubin	36	—	40	94	—	14	—	—	—	17	
"—" denotes a recording that did not chart or was not released in that territory.

=== Compilation albums ===
Title	Album details
The Dream Walker Demos	Release date: May 4, 2016; Label: To the Stars Records; Producer: Tom DeLonge

== Extended plays ==
List of EPs, with selected chart positions
Title	EP details	Peak chart positions		
Title	EP details	US	US Ind.	US Rock
Stomping the Phantom Brake Pedal	Released: December 18, 2012; Label: To the Stars Records; Producer: Tom Delonge; Length: 35:00; Format: CD, download, vinyl	178	22	—
...Of Nightmares	Released: September 4, 2015; Label: To the Stars Records; Length: 17:19	— (Note: ...Of Nightmares did not enter the US Billboard 200, but peaked at number 96 on the US Billboard Current Album Sales Chart.)	18	37
Chasing Shadows	Released: April 8, 2016; Label: To the Stars Records; Length: 16:14	109	8	13
We Don't Need to Whisper Acoustic	Released: August 25, 2017; Label: To the Stars Records; Length: 18:23	— (Note: We Don't Need to Whisper Acoustic did not enter the US Billboard 200, but peaked at number 42 on the US Billboard Album Sales Chart.)	10	—
"—" denotes a recording that did not chart or was not released in that territory.

== Singles ==
Title	Year	Peak chart positions										Album
Title	Year	US	US Alt.	US Pop	US Rock	CAN Rock	CZ Rock	GER	IRL	SCO	UK	Album
"The Adventure"	2006	55	5	51	—	9	—	82	47	15	20	We Don't Need to Whisper
"It Hurts"	2006	—	—	—	—	—	—	—	—	41	59	We Don't Need to Whisper
"Everything's Magic"	2007	— (Note: "Everything's Magic" did not enter the Billboard Hot 100, but peaked at number four on the Bubbling Under Hot 100 chart.)	11	92	—	38	—	—	—	36	107	I-Empire
"Hallucinations"	2009	—	—	—	—	—	—	—	—	—	—	Love
"Epic Holiday"	2010	—	—	—	—	—	—	—	—	—	—	Love
"Young London"	2011	—	—	—	—	—	—	—	—	—	—	Love
"Anxiety"	2011	—	—	—	—	—	—	—	—	—	—	Love II
"Surrender"	2011	—	35	—	48	—	—	—	—	—	—	Love II
"Diary"	2012	—	—	—	—	—	—	—	—	—	—	Stomping the Phantom Brake Pedal
"The Wolfpack"	2014	—	—	—	—	—	—	—	—	—	—	The Dream Walker
"Bullets in the Wind"	2014	—	—	—	—	—	—	—	—	—	—	The Dream Walker
"Tunnels"	2014	—	—	—	—	—	—	—	—	—	—	The Dream Walker
"Rebel Girl"	2019	—	31	—	— (Note: "Rebel Girl" did not enter the Hot Rock & Alternative Songs chart, but peaked at number 49 on the Rock & Alternative Airplay chart.)	—	—	—	—	—	—	Lifeforms
"All That's Left Is Love"	2020	—	— (Note: "All That's Left Is Love" did not enter the Alternative Airplay chart, but peaked at number 22 on the Alternative Digital Song Sales chart.)	—	—	—	—	—	—	—	—	Non-album single
"Paper Thin" (with Illenium and Tom DeLonge)	2020	—	— (Note: "Paper Thin" did not enter the Alternative Airplay chart, but peaked at number six on the Alternative Digital Song Sales chart.)	—	23	—	—	—	—	—	—	Fallen Embers
"Euphoria"	2021	—	—	—	—	—	11	—	—	—	—	Lifeforms
"Restless Souls"	2021	—	—	—	—	—	—	—	—	—	—	Lifeforms
"Losing My Mind"	2021	—	—	—	—	—	7	—	—	—	—	Lifeforms
"Spellbound"	2021	—	—	—	—	—	—	—	—	—	—	Lifeforms
"—" denotes a recording that did not chart or was not released.

=== Promotional singles ===
Title	Year	Peak chart positions					Album
Title	Year	US Alt.	US Rock	CAN DL	UK Indie	UK Rock	Album
"Do It for Me Now"	2006	21	—	—	—	—	We Don't Need to Whisper
"The War"	2006	19	—	—	—	—	We Don't Need to Whisper
"Secret Crowds"	2008	—	—	—	—	—	I-Empire
"Breathe"	2008	—	—	74	—	—	I-Empire
"Paralyzed"	2014	— (Note: "Paralyzed" did not enter the Alternative Airplay chart, but peaked at number 18 on the Alternative Digital Song Sales chart.)	46	—	26	6	The Dream Walker
"Kiss & Tell"	2019	— (Note: "Kiss & Tell" did not enter the Alternative Airplay chart, but peaked at number eight on the Alternative Digital Song Sales chart.)	39	—	—	—	Lifeforms
"Timebomb"	2021	—	—	—	—	—	Lifeforms
"—" denotes a recording that did not chart or was not released.

=== Internet releases ===
Title	Year	Record label
"The Adventure" (Live from the Electric Ballroom)	2006	Geffen
"It Hurts" (Mayfair Studio Session)	2006	Geffen
"Distraction" (live)	2006	Geffen

== Other charted songs ==
Title	Year	Peak chart positions	Album
Title	Year	US Rock DL	Album
"Saturday Love"	2011	35	Love: Part Two

== DVDs ==
Title	Year	Type
Start the Machine	2008	Documentary
Love	2011	Feature film

== Music videos and short films ==
Video	Year	Director(s)	Producer
"The Adventure"	2006	The Malloys	TJ Kearney
"The Adventure" (Short film)	2006	Mark Eaton	TJ Kearney
"It Hurts" (Short film)	2006	Ron Najor and Brian Thompson	TJ Kearney
"Do It for Me Now"	2006	Shilo	TJ Kearney
"The War" (Short film)	2006	Adam Patch	TJ Kearney
"The War" (live)	2006	Mark Eaton	Angels & Airwaves
"The Gift" (Short film)	2006	Mark Eaton	TJ Kearney
"Everything's Magic"	2007	Shane Drake	Unknown
"Everything's Magic" (Short film)	2007	Mark Eaton	Unknown
"Secret Crowds"	2008	Mark Eaton	Unknown
"Breathe"	2008	Mark Eaton and Will Eubank	Unknown
"Hallucinations"	2010	Tom DeLonge	Unknown
"Anxiety"	2011	Mark Eaton and Will Eubank	Nate Kolbeck
"Surrender"	2012	Will Eubank	Unknown
"Diary"	2012	Mark Eaton	Unknown
"The Wolfpack"	2014	Mark Eaton	Unknown
"Tunnels"	2015	Tom Delonge	Unknown
"Rebel Girl"	2019	Matt Thompson	Unknown
"Kiss & Tell"	2019	Unknown	Unknown
"All That's Left Is Love"	2020	Caleb Mallery and Tom DeLonge	Unknown
"Paper Thin"	2020	Kyle Cogan	Simian
"Euphoria"	2021	Tom DeLonge	Bad Beard Productions
"Losing My Mind"	2021	Tom DeLonge	Unknown
"Spellbound"	2021	Tom DeLonge	Bad Beard Productions

== Other appearances ==
=== Albums ===
Title	Year	Angels & Airwaves track
Kevin & Bean's Super Christmas	2006	"Star of Bethlehem" & "True Love"
Kerrang! Class of 2006	2006	"The Adventure" (live)
MTV Presents Laguna Beach: Summer Can Last Forever	2007	"The Adventure"
Warped Tour 2008 Tour Compilation	2008	"Rite of Spring"
SPIKE Video Game Awards 2008	2008	"Secret Crowds"

=== Video games ===
Title	Year	Angels & Airwaves track
Tony Hawk's Proving Ground	2007	"Secret Crowds"
Rock Band (DLC)	2008	"It Hurts"
Guitar Hero On Tour: Modern Hits	2009	"Call to Arms"
Band Hero	2009	"The Adventure"
Guitar Hero: World Tour (DLC)	2009	"Everything's Magic"
Rock Band (DLC)	2012	"The Adventure"
Rocksmith 2014 (DLC)	2019	"The Adventure"
Rock Band (DLC)	2021	"Euphoria"
