= Start the Machine (film) =

- Directed by: Mark Eaton
- Starring: Angels & Airwaves
- Music by: Angels & Airwaves
- Distributed by: Modlife Films
- Release date: June 17, 2008
- Running time: 79 minutes
- Country: United States
- Language: English

Start the Machine is a documentary that focuses on the break-up of Blink-182, the genesis of Angels & Airwaves, and the making of their debut album We Don't Need to Whisper. It was released on DVD on June 17, 2008. The film is named after the closing track on We Don't Need to Whisper.

== Scene index ==
Start the Machine
No.	Title	Length
1.	"I-Empire Trailer" (later retitled as Love)	2:39
2.	"Flight"	5:13
3.	"April 11, 2005"	4:42
4.	"Writing"	4:16
5.	"The Adventure"	4:52
6.	"Rebirth"	4:39
7.	"David James Kennedy"	3:40
8.	"The Gift"	6:22
9.	"Producing"	3:44
10.	"Tom"	7:13
11.	"Big Mouth"	5:33
12.	"Breakdown"	5:19
13.	"Critter"	2:54
14.	"Atom"	3:28
15.	"Ryan"	1:34
16.	"Biographical Moment"	0:30
17.	"The War"	5:22
18.	"Credits"	5:21

Special features
No.	Title	Length
19.	"The Reviews"
20.	"More from the Studio"
21.	"Tom Talks About Blink-182 and AVA"
22.	"Distraction" (live)
23.	"I-Empire Movie Trailer" (later retitled as Love)
24.	"The Adventure" (music video)
25.	"Do It for Me Now" (music video)
26.	"The War" (short film)
27.	"The Adventure" (short film)
28.	"It Hurts" (short film)
29.	"The Gift" (short film)

== Filming and production ==
Start the Machine was filmed over a course of almost 3 years. During this time, Tom DeLonge and David Kennedy (both guitarists from the band) contacted Mark Eaton and asked him to direct this documentary. Both DeLonge and Kennedy had known him for years. Eaton was trusted with the quality of the documentary completely; DeLonge never saw it or approved or disapproved anything before it was submitted to film festivals; he had "nothing to do with putting it together". Eaton would later go on to direct the videos for "Secret Crowds" and "Breathe" by Angels & Airwaves as well.

== Premiere ==
On June 14, the documentary was exclusively premiered three days before its official release at the La Paloma Theater in Encinitas, California. No other theater showings were available for this documentary. Attendance of this show was on a first-come, first-served basis. Admission was $5, free for Modlife members. This special premiere was sponsored by Modlife, Macbeth Footwear, Loserkids, and Wahoo's and let the attendees meet the band and allowed fans to have the chance to win these door prizes:

- Signed guitars and posters
- Macbeth shoes
- Gift certificates for Loserkids.com and Wahoo's
- Modlife Premium membership accounts
- Start the Machine DVDs
- CDs and more

== Reception ==
Start the Machine has been praised by Ultimate Guitar for its honesty, production, and content, receiving a rating of 9.3 out of 10.
