= Atom Willard =

American drummer (born 1973)

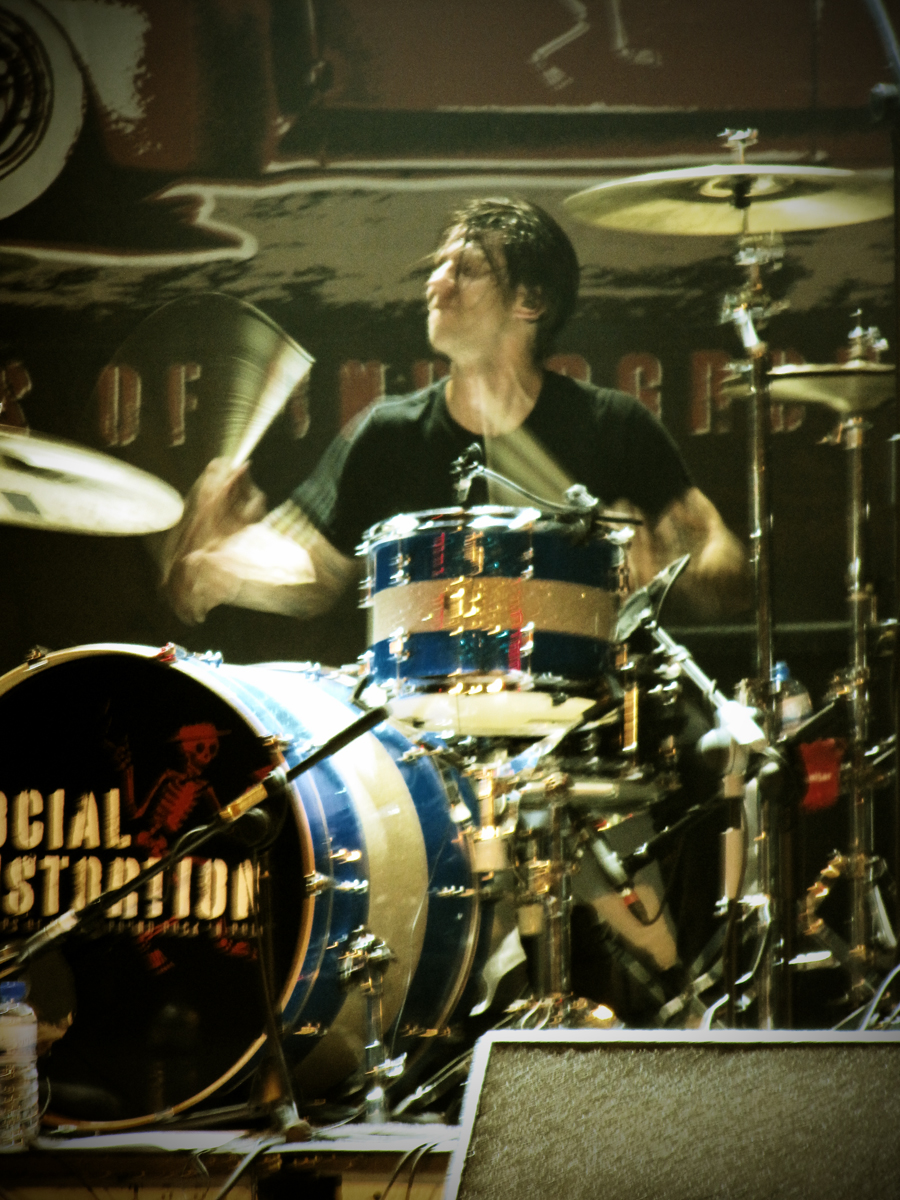
- Willard performing with Social Distortion in 2009

Background information
- Born: Adam David Willard; August 15, 1973 (age 53); San Diego, California, U.S.
- Genres: Alternative rock; punk rock; hardcore punk; metalcore
- Occupation: Drummer
- Years active: 1990–present
- Member of: Lektron; Plosivs; Worriers
- Formerly of: Rocket from the Crypt; Custom Floor; the Special Goodness; the Offspring; Angels & Airwaves; Social Distortion; Danko Jones; Against Me!; Alkaline Trio

Adam David "Atom" Willard (August 15, 1973) is an American drummer who has been a member of several notable musical acts. His career began in 1990 when he joined Rocket from the Crypt, with whom he remained until 2000. Subsequently, he joined the Special Goodness, the Offspring, and in 2005 became a founding member of Angels & Airwaves. In 2007 Willard departed from the Offspring to focus on his work with Angels & Airwaves, and in April 2009 he also joined Social Distortion, but left the following March. In June 2011, he joined the band Danko Jones and in October 2011 amicably left Angels & Airwaves. From 2013 to 2020, he was the drummer for Against Me! until their indefinite hiatus. He was part of Alkaline Trio from 2023 to 2026. Currently he is playing in the bands Worriers, Plosivs, and Lektron.

== Career ==
=== 1990–2000, 2011, 2013, 2014: Rocket from the Crypt ===
Willard joined the San Diego, California rock band Rocket from the Crypt in 1990, after their original drummer Sean had moved away from San Diego. In a 2006 interview Willard recalled of the experience:

It was crazy, man. I was just 16, I would drive down to this kind of sketchy, strange rehearsal space in this part of town I'd never been, and there were people living in some of the spaces. It was just weird, and everybody was older than me. But the sound was rad. It was a lot of soul, a lot of Otis Redding, James Brown–but it was up against a serious punk-rock influence, and just regular rock 'n' roll. Every song had four personalities!

Willard performed on Rocket from the Crypt's second album Circa: Now! (1992) and subsequent albums Hot Charity (1995), Scream, Dracula, Scream! (1995), and RFTC (1998), as well as numerous EPs and singles. During his years with the band he toured the United States, and Europe. Willard recalls several wild tour experiences with the group such as touring in a box truck and an airport shuttle, both at his suggestion. In 2000, however, he decided to leave the group due to disagreements with the other members over the band's direction:

I was getting disillusioned with the way we were doing business. It was getting harder and harder to survive–those tours where you'd come home with no money, that was getting less cool. [Laughs.] I didn't just want to get some temp job to survive and go on tour anymore. I wanted to play the drums; I wanted to play music and make a living off of it. And I thought I could. And we all could. I wanted some changes and Speedo and I were kind of at odds on that stuff; we disagreed on how we should go about it.

Willard was replaced in Rocket from the Crypt's lineup by Mario Rubalcaba.

In October 2011, he reunited with Rocket From the Crypt to perform the song "He's a Chef" on the children's television show Yo Gabba Gabba. In September 2013 he played 3 shows with the band for Riot Fest. In November 2014 he played with the band at Fun Fun Fun Fest in Austin, Texas.

=== 2000–2003: The Special Goodness and temporary acts ===
After leaving Rocket from the Crypt Willard served as a drum technician for Weezer. In 2000 he filled in as a touring drummer for Alkaline Trio and appeared with them in the music video for the single "Private Eye". He soon joined Weezer drummer Patrick Wilson in his side project the Special Goodness, in which Willard drummed while Wilson sang and played guitar. Willard also filled in with Moth in 2002 for tours in support of their third album Provisions, Fiction and Gear and appeared in their music video for "I See Sound". Willard's first recorded output with the Special Goodness was 2003's Land Air Sea. The band have not released an album since then. Willard also recorded drum tracks for the songs "Head Unbound" and "Would If I Could" on Melissa Auf der Maur's debut solo album Auf der Maur (2004).

=== 2003–2005: The Offspring ===
In 2003 Willard became an official member of the Offspring, replacing long-time drummer Ron Welty who had left the group earlier that year. During Willard's tenure with the group he performed on numerous tours but only performed on one song. Professional drummer Josh Freese had recorded the drum tracks for the band's 2003 album Splinter after Welty left the group. Willard joined shortly before the album's release and appeared with them in the music video for the single "(Can't Get My) Head Around You". However, in 2005 he became a founding member of Angels & Airwaves (see below), and his commitments to the new group began to draw him away from the Offspring. The Offspring released a Greatest Hits compilation in 2005 including two new songs, "Can't Repeat" and a cover of The Police's "Next to You". Willard appeared with the band in the "Can't Repeat" music video and recorded the drum tracks for "Next to You". In July 2007 it was officially announced he had left The Offspring to focus on Angels & Airwaves. Freese again recorded drum tracks for the Offspring for Rise and Fall, Rage and Grace (2008) before he was permanently replaced by former Face to Face drummer Pete Parada. Offspring singer Dexter Holland later commented:

The simple truth is that Atom had been working on a few of his own projects during our down time, including Angels & Airwaves but other things too. We think that's great. Unfortunately, in order for him to see those things through he isn't left with enough time to devote to future Offspring stuff. It was a tough choice, but we understand. Atom's been a great drummer for us and we're sure Pete will be great too!

Willard later revealed also partly left because he wasn't happy in the band because he couldn't get creatively fulfilled.

=== 2005–2011: Angels & Airwaves ===
While the Offspring took a "touring hiatus" in 2006, Willard joined Tom DeLonge in his new group Angels & Airwaves. In an interview with Shave Magazine, he said that felt the collective experience of all the members of the band made joining very easy for him.

There's nobody trying to figure out what is and what isn't going to work, not just for themselves but for music and for a band, what life's going to be like on the road and all that kind of stuff. Everybody had enough experience to just buckle down and do the work. It really has made it easier than anything else."

DeLonge remarked that Willard "has always felt to me like the single largest score in music. He is a loyal, honest and humble friend, but an even better showman." The band, which also included former Box Car Racer/Hazen Street guitarist David Kennedy and former Distillers bassist Ryan Sinn, released their debut album We Don't Need to Whisper in May 2006. It peaked at #4 on the Billboard 200 and spawned several successful singles including "The Adventure", "It Hurts", "Do It for Me Now", and "The War", and Willard toured extensively with the group in support of the album.

In July 2007, during production of the band's second album I-Empire, Willard left the Offspring to focus on his work with Angels & Airwaves. The album was released in November 2007 and went on to sell over 200,000 copies in the United States. Singles from I-Empire included "Everything's Magic", "Secret Crowds", and "Breathe". He also played on Angels & Airwaves third album, Love, released in February 2010. Willard toured with Angels & Airwaves in support of the album in May and July.

On October 4, 2011, Willard officially left from Angels & Airwaves. The split is said to have been "amicable" with the rest of the band. Prior to his split with Angels & Airwaves, Willard had completed recording all drum tracks for the group's fourth studio album Love: Part Two released in November 2011.

=== 2009–2010: Social Distortion ===
In April 2009, Willard replaced Charlie Quintana in Social Distortion. He toured Europe and the United States with Social Distortion in 2009, was scheduled to tour South America with them in April 2010, and had been in the studio recording their seventh studio album. On March 8, 2010, due to scheduling conflicts with Angels & Airwaves, Willard departed from Social Distortion. He was replaced by Fu Manchu drummer Scott Reeder for their South American tour.

=== 2011–2013: theHELL ===
In February 2011, Willard joined Matt Skiba of Alkaline Trio for a side project called theHELL. Their debut EP, Sauves les Requines, was released in January 2012. theHELL put out another EP titled Southern Medicine in 2013.

=== 2011–2013: Danko Jones ===
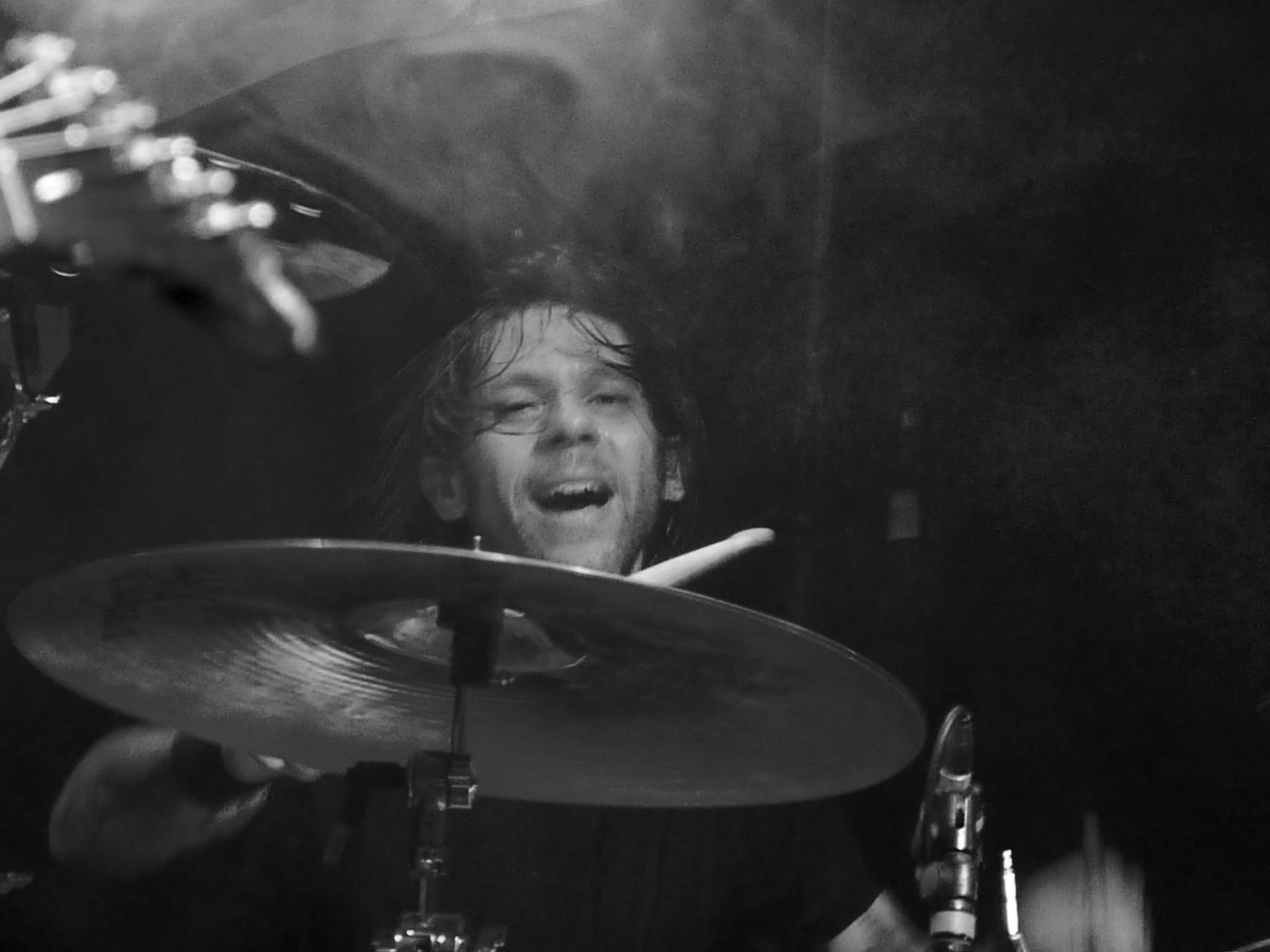
Willard with Danko Jones in 2011

In June 2011, he became the drummer for Canadian group Danko Jones. As of July 2013, he is no longer in Danko Jones.

=== 2013–2020: Against Me! ===
Willard filled in with Against Me! for the band's 2013 Australian tour dates. On July 31, 2013, Willard officially announced on his Twitter page that he was the full-time drummer for Against Me!, led by Laura Jane Grace. In 2018, he also became a member of Laura Jane Grace and the Devouring Mothers.

=== 2001, 2023–2026: Alkaline Trio ===
In early 2023, Willard reunited with Skiba to form a new band, Lektron, alongside AFI bassist Hunter Burgan, and SpiritWorld guitarist Randy Moore. In the coming weeks, he was also announced to be reuniting with Alkaline Trio, this time as their full-time drummer following the departure of Derek Grant. On February 2, 2026, he announced on Instagram that he left Alkaline Trio.

== Musical equipment ==
When performing with Angels and Airwaves his drum kit consists of two snare drums (6.5"x14" and 7"x12"), two tom-toms (6"x6" and 8"x12"), two floor toms (14"x16" and 16"x18"), and a bass drum (18"x26"). For cymbals he uses Zildjian K custom session hi-hats (14"), an A custom EFX crash cymbal (20"), one A custom projection crash (20"), a K custom ride cymbal (22"), and a K custom medium ride cymbal (20"). Since 2010, Atom has been an official Drum Workshop endorser, both for hardware and drums.

== Discography ==
This section lists albums and EPs on which Willard has performed. For complete listings of releases by each act, see their individual articles.

Year	Act	Title	Credits
1992	Rocket from the Crypt	Circa: Now!	Drums on all tracks
1995	Rocket from the Crypt	The State of Art is on Fire	Drums on all tracks
1995	Rocket from the Crypt	Hot Charity	Drums on all tracks
1995	Rocket from the Crypt	Scream, Dracula, Scream!	Drums on all tracks
1998	Rocket from the Crypt	RFTC	Drums on all tracks
1999	Rocket from the Crypt	Cut Carefully and Play Loud	Drums on all tracks
2003	The Special Goodness	Land Air Sea	Drums on all tracks
2004	Melissa Auf der Maur	Auf der Maur	Drums on the tracks "Head Unbound" and "Would If I Could"
2005	The Offspring	Greatest Hits	Drums on the track "Next to You"
2006	Angels & Airwaves	We Don't Need to Whisper	Drums on all tracks
2007	Angels & Airwaves	I-Empire	Drums on all tracks
2010	Angels & Airwaves	Love	Drums on all tracks
2011	Angels & Airwaves	Love: Part Two	Drums on all tracks
2012	theHELL	Sauve Les Requins EP	Drums on all tracks
2012	Danko Jones	Rock and Roll Is Black and Blue	Drums on all tracks
2013	theHELL	Southern Medicine EP	Drums on all tracks
2014	Against Me!	Transgender Dysphoria Blues	Drums on all tracks
2015	Against Me!	23 Live Sex Acts	Drums on all tracks
2016	Against Me!	Shape Shift with Me	Drums on all tracks
2018	Laura Jane Grace and the Devouring Mothers	Bought to Rot	Drums on all tracks
2022	PLOSIVS	PLOSIVS	Drums on all tracks
2023	Worriers	Warm Blanket	Drums on all tracks
2023	Lektron	Lektron	Drums on all tracks
2023	Worriers	Trust Your Gut	Drums on all tracks

== Videography ==
=== Music video appearances ===
Year	Act	Title	Album
1992	Rocket from the Crypt	"Ditchdigger"	Circa: Now!
1992	Rocket from the Crypt	"Sturdy Wrist"	Circa: Now!
1995	Rocket from the Crypt	"On a Rope"	Scream, Dracula, Scream!
1995	Rocket from the Crypt	"Born in '69"	Scream, Dracula, Scream!
1995	Rocket from the Crypt	"Young Livers"	Scream, Dracula, Scream!
1998	Rocket from the Crypt	"Break It Up"	RFTC
2000	Alkaline Trio	"Private Eye"	From Here to Infirmary
2002	Moth	"I See Sound"	Provisions, Fiction and Gear
2003	The Special Goodness	"Life Goes By"	Land Air Sea
2003	The Special Goodness	"N.F.A."	Land Air Sea
2004	The Offspring	"(Can't Get My) Head Around You"	Splinter
2005	The Offspring	"Can't Repeat"	Greatest Hits
2006	Angels & Airwaves	"The Adventure"	We Don't Need to Whisper
2006	Angels & Airwaves	"It Hurts"	We Don't Need to Whisper
2006	Angels & Airwaves	"Do It for Me Now"	We Don't Need to Whisper
2006	Angels & Airwaves	"The War"	We Don't Need to Whisper
2006	Angels & Airwaves	"The Gift"	We Don't Need to Whisper
2007	Angels & Airwaves	"Everything's Magic"	I-Empire
2008	Angels & Airwaves	"Secret Crowds"	I-Empire
2008	Angels & Airwaves	"Breathe"	I-Empire
2010	Angels & Airwaves	"Hallucinations"	Love
2011	Angels & Airwaves	"Anxiety"	Love: Part Two
2012	Danko Jones	"Just a Beautiful Day"	Rock and Roll Is Black and Blue
2016	Against Me!	"Crash"	Shape Shift with Me
2023	Alkaline Trio	"Blood, Hair, and Eyeballs"	Blood, Hair, and Eyeballs
2023	Alkaline Trio	"Bad Time"	Blood, Hair, and Eyeballs
2024	Alkaline Trio	"Break"	Blood, Hair, and Eyeballs
