= Angels & Airwaves Presents Love Live =

2011 concert by Angels & Airwaves

AVA Presents LOVE Live
- Remotely broadcast concert and film screening tour by Angels & Airwaves
- A One Night Event, August 10
- Location: Paradise Rock Club, Boston, U.S.
- Associated album: Love
- Start date: August 10, 2011
- End date: August 10, 2011
- Legs: 1
- No. of shows: 1 in the United States at 480+ venues
- Website: www.fathomevents.com/concerts/event/angelsandairwaves.aspx

Angels & Airwaves Presents Love Live was a one-night film screening and live-streamed concert that took place at 8:00pm ET on August 10, 2011, in 480 movie theatres across the United States and presented by the international rock multimedia project Angels & Airwaves.

Over 480 theatres hosted the event with tickets costing $15. The event used National CineMedia's NCM Fathom technology to conduct the live show.

It is unclear if a band has attempted a dual film-screening/concert at this scale before; MTV News called the event plans a "unique multimedia extravaganza".

The question and answer session was moderated by the editor-in-chief of TransWorld Surf, Chris Cote.

== Program itinerary ==
The event organizers list six different aspects of the evening, in the following order:

1. Vignettes (see below): showing of four character-study short films (bonus material to complement the feature film) during the 30 minutes leading up to the event
2. Introductions: welcomes and opening remarks from Angels & Airwaves frontman and Love executive producer, Tom DeLonge and writer and director William Eubank, broadcast live from Boston
3. Feature film: screening of the band's 2011 movie Love, previously only seen on the film festival circuit
4. Concert: live broadcast of performance of 3 of the band's most popular songs from the Paradise Rock Club
5. Dialog: live question and answer dialog with the filmmakers and the movie's star, Gunner Wright, taken from questions submitted to the Love Live Facebook page
6. Music video: world-premiere of the band's music video for the song Anxiety, a new song from the forthcoming album Love: Part Two

== Vignettes ==
Event organizers announced that four short films would be played during the 30 minutes before the event. The short character studies featured music from the band and were titled based on the song featured in each. The band released the four films online the week before the nationwide screening to help promote the event.

Title	Character featured	Starring	Released	Link
Clever Love	Marine	Troy Mittleider IMDb	July 21	Watch on Vimeo
Soul Survivor	Skateboarder	Jesse Hotchkiss IMDb	August 1	Watch on Vimeo
Hallucinations	The Storyteller	Roger E. Fanter IMDb	August 3	Watch on Vimeo
Epic Holiday	Motorcycle Racer	Brid Caveney IMDb	August 8	Watch on Vimeo

According to director William Eubank, "The vignettes are not just character back-stories, [...] each one represents some of the more pertinent themes explored in the film: communication, isolation, relationship, and fate vs destiny. Which one explores what, is up to the viewer".

== Attendance ==
Three days after tickets went on sale for the event, organizers claimed to have sold over half of available tickets.

== Method of distribution ==
The band chose to partner directly with theatres in the distribution for the August 10 screenings. Angels and Airwaves partnered with AMC and Regal Cinemas through the technology intermediary National CineMedia. This garnered some attention, with media outlets mentioning the new use of such technologies by filmmakers. I Am Rogue mentioned the July announcement by Francis Ford Coppola of his planned experimental film Twixt, featuring a future multi-city tour with he and his composer planning to appear live with the film.

Asked about the distribution scheme, Eubank stated "[There's] crazy stuff happening now with digital distribution [...] I think this is the perfect thing to do where we're finding our own way to get it into theaters through personal relationships with AMC and others. It's totally changing the [independent-film world], like what Kevin Smith did touring with his film. [It's] cool to be a filmmaker now where you have all these options and you can find your own way to distribution."

Tom DeLonge told media sources that they had always considered the setup and said "I'm so happy it will finally be experienced the way we always envisioned–seen on the big screen in theaters all over the country in 5.1 sound." He also discussed the issues facing independent film distribution, stating "We talked to a lot of different companies about all of our options, but it was by far the best opportunity for what we are. You know, we’re able to perform and have a movie, all in the same thing. And hit 500 theaters, which never would have happened with any other independent distributor. They just don’t have the budgets anymore. The independent film industry is hurting really bad, the same way the music industry was."
