= Angels & Airwaves =

American rock band

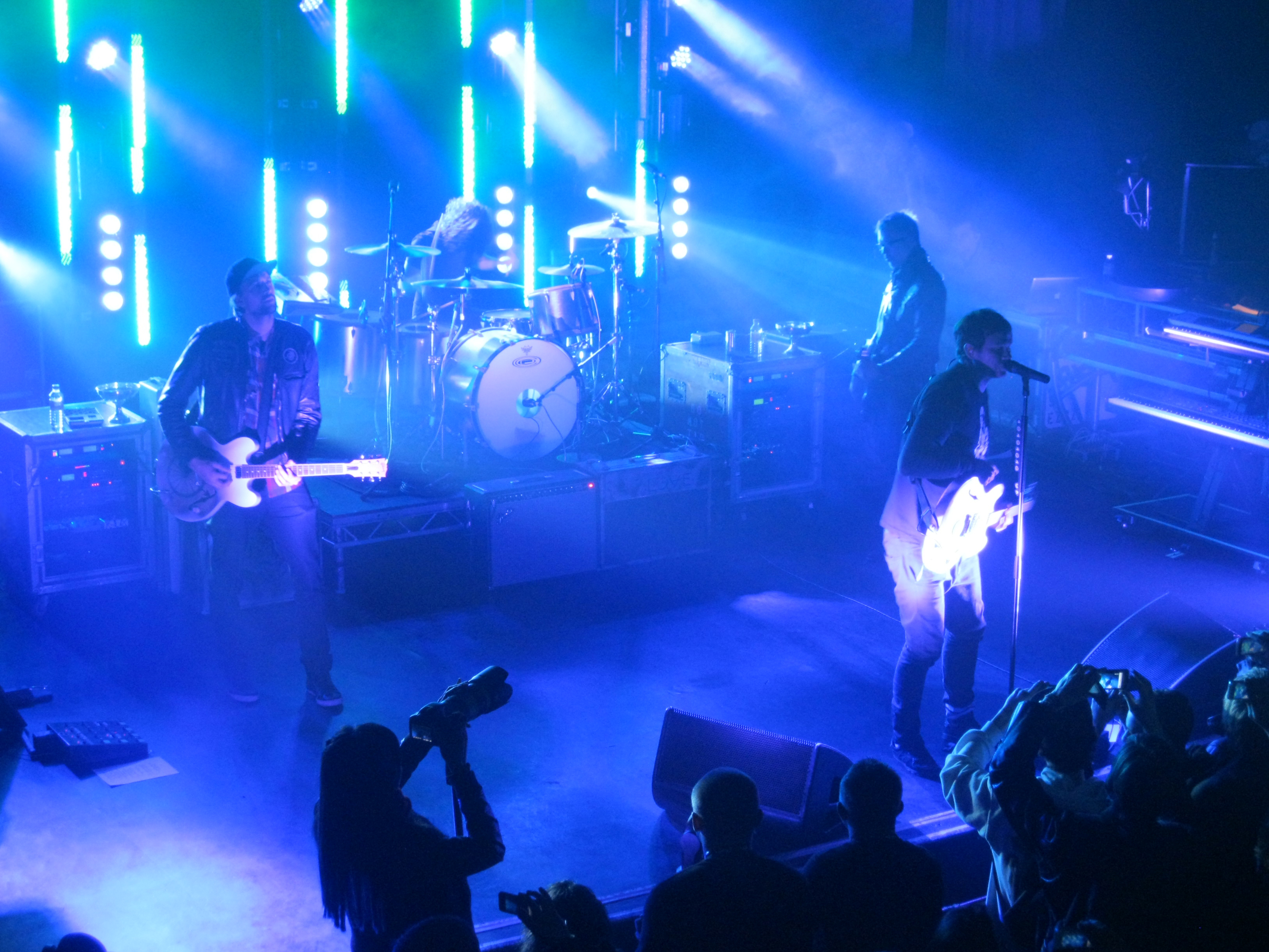
- Angels & Airwaves performing at Shepherd's Bush Empire in 2012.

Background information
- Origin: San Diego, California, U.S.
- Genres: Alternative rock; space rock
- Years active: 2005–present
- Labels: Geffen; Suretone; To the Stars; Rise
- Spinoff of: Blink-182; Box Car Racer
- Members: Tom DeLonge; David Kennedy; Ilan Rubin; Matt Rubano
- Past members: Atom Willard; Ryan Sinn; Matt Wachter; Eddie Breckenridge
- Website: angelsandairwaves.com
- Logo
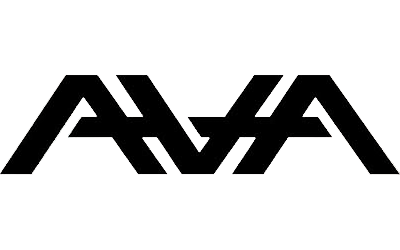

Angels & Airwaves (also written as Angels and Airwaves; stylized and abbreviated as ΛVΛ) is an American rock band comprising lead vocalist/guitarist Tom DeLonge, guitarist David Kennedy, drummer Ilan Rubin, and bassist Matt Rubano.

The band formed after Blink-182 went on hiatus in 2005. They continued to record even after Blink-182 reunited in 2009, and after DeLonge subsequently parted with the band again in 2015, he began to focus on Angels & Airwaves more extensively. To date, the band has released six studio albums: We Don't Need to Whisper (2006), I-Empire (2007), Love (2010), Love: Part Two (2011), The Dream Walker (2014) and Lifeforms (2021). The project also resulted in the documentary film Start the Machine (2008). In 2011, accompanying the two Love albums, the group scored and produced the science fiction drama film Love by director William Eubank in 460 theatres nationwide during their multimedia event, Love Live. The band released an animated short named Poet Anderson: The Dream Walker and their fifth album, The Dream Walker, on December 9, 2014. Other related media, such as comic books and a live-action film, followed in 2015.

The group has been described by DeLonge as "an art project [that approaches] larger human themes and tackles them in different mediums", or simply "a multimedia project". He cited that this has been seen in the group's films, live events, and novel approach to fan-artist interaction.

The band's first two albums were mainly influenced by the music of Radiohead and Pink Floyd, in addition to the band U2.

== History ==
=== Formation and origins (2004–2005) ===
Tom DeLonge began working on new material during Blink-182's final tour in 2004 and shortly after they began their break in February 2005. For half a year he worked alone in his home studio before gathering musicians to form the band. Upon fiddling randomly for several weeks with the band's logo, DeLonge realized that if he were to invert the middle "A" of the band's acronym into what appeared to be a "V", he would have the name of his daughter, Ava. As rumors were floating around about the band's "break-up", DeLonge chose to abstain for six months from any interviews surrounding the issue and his future plans; instead he concentrated on writing and recording in his home-based studio. In September 2005, he finally spoke publicly in Kerrang! magazine, where he unveiled the name of his new band, Angels & Airwaves. The band included former Hazen Street guitarist and high-school friend David Kennedy, former Rocket from the Crypt and The Offspring drummer Atom Willard and former The Distillers bass guitarist Ryan Sinn. Atom Willard told Shave magazine that the experience of all the members of the band made the band formation very easy, stating that "everybody had enough experience to just buckle down and do the work. It really has made it easier than anything else."

=== We Don't Need to Whisper (2005–2007) ===
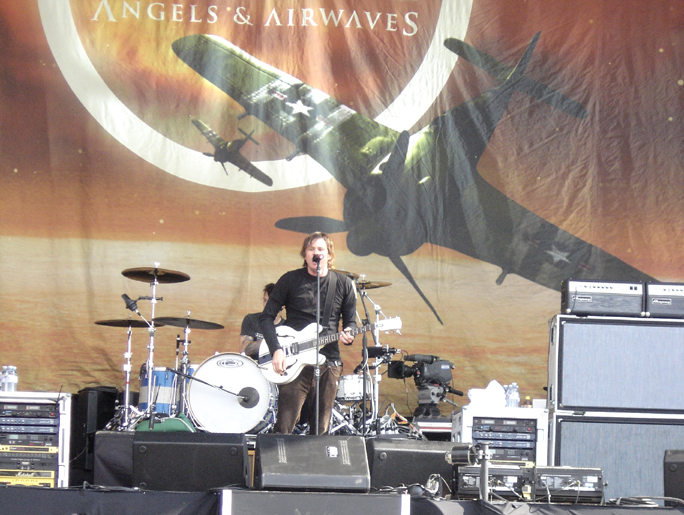
Angels & Airwaves performing at Hyde Park in June 2006.

Soon after forming, the band began recording its first album in DeLonge's studio in California from mid-2005 to early 2006. However, after a fan email hacked DeLonge and stole four demos, Angels & Airwaves had no other choice but to release "The Adventure" as their first single, which was leaked onto radio stations, causing a premature release on May 18, 2006. A few days later, on May 23, they released their first album, We Don't Need to Whisper. The album reached No. 4 on the Billboard 200 and went gold in both the US and Canada. Despite this success, critics gave generally mixed reviews, with one noting that "while well-intentioned, [the band] failed to reach the lofty heights to which they aspire", especially in light of claims made by DeLonge that the album would be "the greatest rock and roll revolution for this generation". Yet, later that year, popularity picked up with the release of singles "The War", "Do It For Me Now" and "It Hurts". The remainder of the year into 2007 was taken up with tours, and in early 2007, the supergroup returned to the studio to work on a follow-up album.

However, problems accumulated and on April 23, 2007, Angels & Airwaves announced that Ryan Sinn would not play at the Free Earth Day concert at the M.I.T. campus due to difficulties within the band. Following this incident, on May 15, Sinn posted on the Army of Angels fan club message board stating that he was "no longer a part of Angels & Airwaves" and had received a call on the evening of April 19 concluding his relationship with the band. Matt Wachter (the former bassist of 30 Seconds to Mars), filled in for the show and was later confirmed as a permanent member.

=== I-Empire (2007–2009) ===
The second studio album, titled I-Empire and the first song "Everything's Magic" were leaked to the Internet, and on August 25, 2007, it was the most requested song on California radio station KROQ. Angels & Airwaves began streaming the song on their MySpace profile on August 28, 2007. It also became available on iTunes, and reached number three on the iTunes Rock Chart on September 11, 2007, before the song was even made available for nationwide airplay. The band recorded the video for the single on January 20 and 21, and it was premiered on MTV2 Unleashed on February 25, 2008. Their second single "Secret Crowds" was released on February 4, 2008, along with an accompanying video. The band released a third single, "Breathe", that was released onto the Internet on June 20.

Angels & Airwaves performed at every location on Warped Tour 2008. They also made a fall tour in support of Weezer. DeLonge revealed that during the duration of the first two albums, he was addicted to painkillers due to suffering a slipped disc in his back some years prior.

The band took a break from performing in 2009 while DeLonge reunited with Blink-182 for a summer tour. During their time off, Atom Willard joined Social Distortion as touring drummer, while Matt Wachter and David Kennedy began work on the upcoming film.

=== Love and Love Album: Part Two (2009–2012) ===
When DeLonge and Willard returned in the fall, the band resumed production of its next album. Love is the third studio album by Angels and Airwaves, which was officially released worldwide on February 14, 2010, after being delayed from Christmas 2009. Fuel TV also released it two days earlier for Modlife members, along with Mark Hoppus' remix of "Hallucinations" available to those who donated when downloading the album. The album was released free of charge due to "corporate underwriting". They began producing it in January 2009 but progress was slow due to Blink-182 reuniting and going on tour. The band finished the album in time for its release on Valentine's Day 2010. Love was downloaded nearly 500,000 times during the first 48 hours after its release day. The first single from the album, "Hallucinations", was made available for free through the band's Modlife on December 23, 2009. The band also released the video via Modlife on March 7, 2010.

The band toured North America, starting on March 27 in Anaheim, California. The tour ended on May 30 in Ventura, California, and DeLonge returned to Blink-182 to prepare for their upcoming album and European tour. DeLonge originally revealed that there would be another tour, rumored to have UK dates, after the release of the Love film in the autumn, but plans were changed due to DeLonge's commitments with Blink-182. "Epic Holiday" is on the soundtrack to the German film Kokowääh with Til Schweiger.

The second studio album in the Love project, Love: Part Two, was released on November 8, 2011. DeLonge described the album as better than the first part of Love and also confirmed that there would be a box set with both albums and a DVD of the movie. The first single released was "Anxiety"; it was premiered following Love Live on August 10, 2011. The music video for "Anxiety" was released on YouTube on August 11, 2011. It was made available for purchase on iTunes on September 14, 2011.

Before the release of Love: Part II, DeLonge revealed that Angels & Airwaves had already begun working on two new albums and two corresponding films. On October 4, it was announced on their Facebook page that drummer Atom Willard had left the band. The departure seemed to be a mutual understanding and Atom thanked the members of Angels & Airwaves for a great six years of making music together. On October 7, it was announced that Angels & Airwaves would be part of the lineup for the Soundwave Festival in Australia, in February and March 2012. It was announced on October 20, 2011, that Ilan Rubin, famous for his work with Lostprophets and Nine Inch Nails, was the new drummer of the band. In March 2012, it was confirmed that Angels & Airwaves would perform the 2012 Reading & Leeds festivals in August 2012. The band also performed at the annual KROQ Weenie Roast concert on May 5, 2012.

On November 9, 2012, a new EP bundle pack titled Stomping the Phantom Brake Pedal was announced as limited pressing.

=== The Dream Walker (2014–2016) ===
On April 1, 2014, DeLonge announced via his official Facebook page that the band's fifth album would be released on October 31, 2014. The announcement came with another still from the POET film depicting a futuristic city. In an interview with Alter The Press! published on June 6, 2014, DeLonge confirmed the scheduled release date and says of the album: "There are things that will never change, like my melodic sensibility and the way that I write. But the song structures, arrangements, chord progressions and tonalities have all changed radically." This came in the wake of recent reflections in the nature of the previous albums. DeLonge felt it was a needed departure for the band since he felt like everything was beginning to sound the same. It was revealed on June 24 that Matt Wachter had left the band to concentrate on his family. DeLonge posted a message on Facebook explaining that they are still both close friends and that Matt would possibly join them again one day. On July 4, Angels & Airwaves completed filming their new music video for the new single on the album that comes out on Halloween. On July 9, Tom DeLonge confirmed in a photo post on the band's Facebook page that Eddie Breckenridge (of the post-hardcore band Thrice) had joined Angels & Airwaves.

A new song from the upcoming album, titled "Paralyzed", was made available for purchase via MixRadio. Engineer Aaron Rubin confirmed that this version was not yet mastered. He also confirmed that the final version will be released on October 5. DeLonge announced via his Twitter account that "Paralyzed" is not the first single off The Dream Walker. "Paralyzed" was premiered on RollingStone.com on October 7. On October 26, the first single from The Dream Walker, The Wolfpack, was leaked on SoundCloud. On October 30, 2014, Tom DeLonge released the track list for The Dream Walker album. On December 8, the full The Dream Walker album streamed exclusively with Rolling Stone.

In light of recent speculation as to the status of David Kennedy and Eddie Breckenridge with the band, DeLonge confirmed during an interview with Rock Sound on November 11 that both members were still involved with Angels & Airwaves, though he did not specify to what extent, claiming, "I think people are just confused. I get it, but I try to tell people to look at the whole project, not at any one piece. This isn't just a band, it's a little bit of a moving target and a much bigger project.".

On January 28, 2015, the music video for "Tunnels" was released, featuring footage from DeLonge's animated film, Poet Anderson: The Dream Walker. The video also features David Kennedy and Eddie Breckenridge playing alongside DeLonge and Rubin. There came news that video was finished in July 2014, but was released later, bringing to speculation whether Kennedy and Breckenridge are still in the band.

After his departure from blink-182 in January 2015, Tom DeLonge said in interview in March, that he expected to release four albums in 2015 – two Angels & Airwaves albums and two solo albums – three of which would include a companion novel. On September 4, 2015, the band released the EP ...Of Nightmares, as the first of the promised albums by DeLonge, which was followed by a graphic novel of the same name, written by DeLonge and Suzanne Young in October. However, by the end of the year, this (along with DeLonge's solo album To the Stars... Demos, Odds and Ends) ended up being the only album released.

The band released the EP Chasing Shadows on April 5, 2016, accompanied by the novel of the same name, written by DeLonge and A. J. Hartley.

On May 4, 2016, the band released a 26-track album of demos from The Dream Walker sessions on To the Stars website.

=== Lifeforms (2017–present) ===
In February 2017, DeLonge announced that he would be directing a film, Strange Times, which would be based on his graphic novel series of the same name. The movie was set to feature new Angels & Airwaves songs, while the next album would serve as the soundtrack. Production of the film was slated to begin in late 2017, but in December 2018, DeLonge announced that TBS would be adapting the novels into a television series instead, and that he would be acting as a producer rather than a director.

On August 25, 2017, the band released We Don't Need to Whisper – Acoustic EP, which contained acoustic renditions of the first four songs from their first album. DeLonge stated that he "wanted to give the fans something while the band works on the soundtrack to the upcoming Strange Times film".

In April 2018, DeLonge confirmed that both David Kennedy and Matt Wachter would be performing on the band's next album. In April 2019, the band signed a record contract with Rise Records. On April 30, the band released their single, "Rebel Girl". The release confirmed the band's current line-up of DeLonge, Kennedy, and Rubin, with no explanation for Wachter's absence being given. Following the release, the band announced a 23-date North American tour, which would feature former Taking Back Sunday bassist, Matt Rubano, in Wachter's place. The band played their first live show in seven years on August 28, 2019, in Solana Beach, California, where they also debuted another new song, "Kiss & Tell", before releasing it the next day.

In November 2019, the band announced plans for a winter tour beginning in December, as well as a projected release date for the album in 2020. Part way through the tour in January, the remaining dates were rescheduled after DeLonge was diagnosed with an upper respiratory infection. The rescheduled dates were eventually cancelled in April due to the COVID-19 pandemic. In response to the pandemic, the band wrote another new song "All That's Left Is Love", which was released on April 16, 2020. It was also revealed that all profits made from the song would be donated to Feeding America's COVID-19 relief fund.

On May 11, 2021, the band announced a new fan community subscription service called The Empire Club, which was followed by the release of the album's second single, "Euphoria", and corresponding music video eight days later. This was their first release with Rubano being credited as a songwriter, confirming that he had officially joined the band. Lifeforms was officially announced on June 15, 2021, alongside the release of the album's third single, "Restless Souls", and United States and European tour dates throughout 2021 and 2022. However, the 2022 European dates were ultimately cancelled due to COVID concerns. Additional songs "Losing My Mind", "Spellbound", and "Timebomb" were released in the following weeks before the album itself was released on September 24, 2021.

Following the 2021 US tour, the band continued to support Lifeforms with a live stream experience on November 9, 2021. DeLonge stated that the band has "always seen new technologies as opening up new opportunities, and we hope this experience is only the start of a new way to connect deeply with our fans." Support continued when the band announced the graphic novel, Lifeform: Vivian, which will explore the character on the album's cover. The novel was announced on April 21, 2022, with a planned release of fall that same year.

In October 2022, DeLonge returned to Blink-182.

== Television appearances ==
In "Even Fairy Tale Characters Would Be Jealous", November 9, 2008, episode of One Tree Hill, aired on the CW Network, the band was asked to perform at a USO concert for US Marines. The band members were eager for their appearance on the show, as they joined the ranks of past bands who have been guests on One Tree Hill. Angels & Airwaves delivered a couple of songs for their stint on the series. During the USO concert, they played the single "Secret Crowds", while "Lifeline" was played on the closing credits.

== Films ==
Start the Machine is a documentary that focuses on the break-up of Blink-182, the genesis of Angels & Airwaves, and the making of their first album We Don't Need to Whisper. It was released on DVD on June 17, 2008. Start the Machine was filmed over a course of almost three years.

Love is a science fiction film directed by William Eubank and starring Gunner Wright that was released in a special event called Love Live on August 10, 2011. "It starts in the Civil War and you travel through time and space. There's a couple of different storylines. The main one is, a guy gets sent up to the International Space Station, and he gets abandoned up there. He doesn't know why. So throughout his years of being stuck up there, he sees the Earth starting to collapse below. He ends up basically becoming the last person alive. And then decades later, he wakes up one day and there's something outside of the ISS, in low Earth orbit with him."

In late 2014, the band released an animated short film called Poet Anderson: The Dream Walker, supporting their album The Dream Walker.

== Graphic art ==
The band's albums have featured space rock images with considerable influences from the work of Storm Thorgerson. The band members explicitly state that there are Pink Floyd influences in their work. In November 2011, the band released a special edition copy of their film Love in graphic novel format with the double album and movie from the band's official website. The band released the graphic novel Poet Anderson: ...Of Nightmares on October 6, 2015, written by DeLonge and Suzanne Young. It was accompanied by the EP ...Of Nightmares, released on September 4, 2015.

== Musical style ==
Angels & Airwaves' music style has generally been regarded as alternative rock, space rock, art rock, and neo-prog. Tom DeLonge's guitar work in the band is similar to his guitar playing in Blink-182, albeit with more guitar effects. He said: "All I wanted was something that sounded like it was echoing over a large place. So I put echoes on everything."

== Band members ==
Current

- Tom DeLonge – lead vocals, guitars, keyboards, synthesizers (2005–present); bass guitar (2014–2018)
- David Kennedy – guitars, keyboards, synthesizers (2005–2014, 2018–present); backing vocals (2011–2014)
- Ilan Rubin – drums, percussion, backing vocals (2011–present); keyboards, guitars, bass guitar (2014–present)
- Matt Rubano – bass guitar, synthesizers, backing vocals (2019–present)

Former

- Atom Willard – drums, percussion, occasional backing vocals (2005–2011)
- Ryan Sinn – bass guitar, backing vocals (2005–2007)
- Matt Wachter – bass guitar, synthesizers, backing vocals (2007–2014, 2018–2019)
- Eddie Breckenridge – bass guitar, backing vocals (2014)

== Discography ==
- We Don't Need to Whisper (2006)
- I-Empire (2007)
- Love (2010)
- Love: Part Two (2011)
- The Dream Walker (2014)
- Lifeforms (2021)

== Awards and nominations ==
MTV Video Music Awards

- Nominated: Best New Artist in a Video (2006) for "The Adventure"
- Nominated: Best Special Effects in a Video (2006) for "The Adventure"
- Nominated: Best Editing in a Video (2006) for "The Adventure"
- Nominated: Best Band of 2006 (2006) for "We Don't Need To Whisper"

=== Toronto International Film Festival ===
- Won: Best Animation (2014) for Poet Anderson: The Dream Walker
