= Love (Angels & Airwaves album) =

- Cover used for digital download and promotional release.

Studio album by Angels & Airwaves
- Released: February 12, 2010
- Recorded: January–November 2009
- Genre: Space rock; alternative rock; progressive rock
- Length: 53:59
- Label: To the Stars
- Producer: Tom DeLonge

Angels & Airwaves chronology
I-Empire (2007)	Love (2010)	Love: Part Two (2011)

Alternative cover
- Reissue cover art

Singles from Love
- 1. "Hallucinations" Released: December 23, 2009; 2. "Epic Holiday" Released: 2010

Love (later retitled Love, Pt. 1) is the third studio album by the alternative rock band Angels & Airwaves. It was released on February 12, 2010, on Fuel TV, and on February 14 on Modlife. The album was released free of charge due to "corporate underwriting". A "special edition" hard copy version of the album was scheduled for release on March 22, 2011, along with a second disc containing new music from the band. This was announced at a Q & A for the movie, which stated that it would be delayed to fall 2011.

== Production ==
On January 12, 2010, the band released a promotional video entitled "C:\Transmission_Love", which contained a short preview of "The Flight of Apollo".

== Release and special editions ==
In May 2009, it was announced that the album would be released on Christmas Day. However, on July 19, 2009, DeLonge announced on Modlife that instead it would be released on Valentine's Day. The album was released free of charge through Modlife on Valentine's Day 2010.

The first single from the album, "Hallucinations" was released free of charge on December 23, 2009. The music video for "Hallucinations" was released on Modlife on February 27, 2010.

Angels & Airwaves released the album an hour and a half early on their Modlife page at 4:30pm Pacific Time to their premium members and Fuel TV subsequently released it at 6pm Pacific Time on February 12. free of charge.

When the album was first released, a version of the song "Hallucinations" remixed by Mark Hoppus was given to fans who donated to the band. This remix is no longer available to download.

Angels & Airwaves partnered with many companies for the release of the album, in an attempt to reach as many people as possible. Fuel TV, Loserkids.com and ONE, and the Keep-A-Breast Foundation are just some of the organizations that have helped the band release the record through links featured on their websites and through emails sent to the subscribers of their mailing lists.

== Sound ==
The music of Love, DeLonge says, has a progressive rock kind of flavor. "It's like blending Radiohead and U2 together with these kind of Pink Floyd movements", he explains. "Things happen unpredictably and take you to these epic soundscapes. It is very much in the spirit of Angels & Airwaves, but it sounds way, way more thought-out and way more ambitious."

Professional ratings
Review scores
Source	Rating
Alternative Addiction	4.5/5 stars
Alternative Press	3/5 stars
The Daily Campus	(8/10)
Highlander	4.5/5 stars
Idobi	3.5/5 stars
Western Courier (Western Illinois University)	7/10

== Track listing ==
All lyrics are written by Tom DeLonge; all music is composed by Angels & Airwaves.

Love
No.	Title	Length
1.	"Et Ducit Mundum Per Luce"	2:34
2.	"The Flight of Apollo"	6:15
3.	"Young London"	5:03
4.	"Shove"	6:34
5.	"Epic Holiday"	4:38
6.	"Hallucinations"	4:39
7.	"The Moon-Atomic (...Fragments and Fictions)"	6:17
8.	"Clever Love"	4:27
9.	"Soul Survivor (...2012)"	4:04
10.	"Letters to God, Pt. 2"	4:06
11.	"Some Origins of Fire"	5:20
Total length:		53:57

Notes

- The track "Letters to God, Pt. 2" serves as a sequel to the song "Letters to God" from DeLonge's early 2000's side-project Box Car Racer.

Additional downloadable track (was available for a limited time when donated to Modlife)
No.	Title	Length
12.	"Hallucinations" (Marktopus remix)	4:42

== Charts ==
Love charted on the US Billboard 200 when released on iTunes in 2011.

Chart	Peak position
US Billboard 200	67

== Personnel ==
Angels & Airwaves

- Tom DeLonge – lead vocals, rhythm guitar, keyboards
- David Kennedy – lead guitar, keyboards, synthesizers
- Matt Wachter – bass guitar, synthesizers, backing vocals
- Atom Willard – drums, percussion

== Film ==
A movie with the same title, Love, was also released. It "tells a story of human life and destiny but at the same time really makes usual moments of life extraordinary. It is a circular narrative in many ways, where it kind of sums up the human race in a time capsule". A 3-minute trailer was released on Friday, July 31, 2009, on the Angels & Airwaves website, featuring explosions, heavy artillery and Civil War soldiers. Part of the song "Letters to God, Part II" was usfeatured during the video. The movie appears to involve scenes aboard the International Space Station, keeping true to Tom's apparent interest in space as seen in many Angels & Airwaves music videos. The official movie trailer was released on Apple Trailers on Friday, October 30, 2009, and made available on Modlife. The film is not related to the 2008 film, Start the Machine, a documentary that followed the making of the first album.

On January 7, Tom DeLonge shared a bit of the plot of the movie on ModCam, saying that the astronaut goes through a wormhole and meets God. More was released on the plot of the movie when DeLonge was interviewed by ABC. He said, on January 22, that the movie "centers on an astronaut who is stranded in a space station as the Earth collapses".

In an interview with Entertainment Weekly, DeLonge was asked what the movie Love was about. He said, "It starts in the Civil War and you travel through time and space. There's a couple of different storylines. The main one is, a guy gets sent up to the International Space Station, and he gets abandoned up there. He doesn't know why. So throughout his years of being stuck up there, he sees the Earth starting to collapse below. He ends up basically becoming the last person alive. And then decades later, he wakes up one day and there's something outside of his spaceship, in low Earth orbit with him."

On the Apple website, a description of the movie Love reads as follows: "After losing contact with Earth, Astronaut Lee Miller (Gunner Wright) becomes stranded in orbit alone aboard the International Space Station. As time passes and life support systems dwindle, Lee battles to maintain his sanity — and simply stay alive. His world is a claustrophobic and lonely existence, until he makes a strange discovery aboard the ship. Driven by the powerful music of Angels & Airwaves, Love explores the fundamental human need for connection and the limitless power of hope... A high-impact visual adventure, that resonates a common truth, that everyone has a story to tell and something even greater to leave behind."
