= Bought to Rot =

Studio album by Laura Jane Grace & the Devouring Mothers
- Released: November 9, 2018
- Recorded: May–June 2018
- Studio: Rancho Recordo
- Genres: Punk rock, indie rock, heartland rock
- Length: 38:21
- Labels: Bloodshot; Red Scare Industries (reissue)
- Producers: Laura Jane Grace, Marc Hudson

Laura Jane Grace chronology
Heart Burns (2008)	Bought to Rot (2018)	Stay Alive (2020)

Professional ratings
Aggregate scores
Source	Rating
Metacritic	75/100
Review scores
Source	Rating
AllMusic	4/5 stars
Exclaim!	8/10
The Guardian	4/5 stars
The Line of Best Fit	8/10
NME	3/5 stars
Paste	7.5/10
Under the Radar	5/10

Bought to Rot is the debut studio album by American rock band Laura Jane Grace and the Devouring Mothers. The group consists of Laura Jane Grace (lead singer of Against Me!), Atom Willard (drummer of Against Me!) and Marc Hudson (long-time sound engineer and collaborator with Against Me!). The album was released on November 9, 2018, on Bloodshot Records, a Chicago label that Grace approached when she discovered the label's headquarters was a few blocks from her residence. In 2022, Red Scare Industries "took over" the album from Bloodshot and began selling a new LP version with alternate artwork with by Grace.

The album's title refers to the difficulty of Grace having written the album's songs, but feeling that they were not suitable for an Against Me! record, which was expected to be the album Grace would release in 2018.

== Background and recording ==
I went in and asked if they’d consider giving the songs a home. They were cool enough to hear me out and oblige. I couldn’t be more happy about the work we’re going to do together and sharing it with the world.

— Grace, on partnering with Bloodshot

Laura Jane Grace announced in July 2018 that the band she had performed previous solo tours with since 2016, The Devouring Mothers, had recently completed Grace's second solo record together, to be released on Bloodshot Records in Autumn 2018. The band's members since its inception have been Grace and Willard from Against Me!, as well as long-time producer and collaborator Marc Hudson. The album is said to be heavily influenced by the works of Rowland S. Howard and Tom Petty, and includes collaborations with other artists.

Following a period of turbulence in Against Me!, the songs were recorded quickly in order to have them finalised before Grace underwent surgery shortly after the record's release, so as not to have the songs "rot" like surplus groceries bought. Grace later confirmed in January 2019 that she had undergone facial feminization surgery as part of her transition.

The album was announced for preorder on 29 August, with an immediate release of "Apocalypse Now (& Later)" (the fourth track on the album) on streaming services. On 11 October, "The Airplane Song" began streaming online, followed by "Reality Bites" on 25 October.

Before being cut short due to the COVID-19 pandemic, Against Me! covered the song "Reality Bites" as a full band in two live shows in March 2020.

== Track listing ==
All tracks are written by Laura Jane Grace, except "Reality Bites" (Grace, Sabrina Ellis).

No.	Title	Length
1.	"China Beach"	2:04
2.	"Born in Black"	3:10
3.	"The Airplane Song"	2:30
4.	"Apocalypse Now (& Later)"	2:15
5.	"Reality Bites"	2:11
6.	"Amsterdam Hotel Room"	2:07
7.	"The Friendship Song"	3:04
8.	"I Hate Chicago"	3:03
9.	"Screamy Dreamy"	2:05
10.	"Manic Depression"	3:48
11.	"The Acid Test Song"	3:06
12.	"The Hotel Song"	2:49
13.	"Valeria Golino"	3:15
14.	"The Apology Song"	2:54
Total length:		38:21

== Personnel ==
=== Band ===
- Laura Jane Grace – guitar, vocals
- Marc Hudson – bass guitar, organ
- Atom Willard – drums, percussion

=== Additional musicians ===
- James Bowman – guitar (track 4)

=== Production and design ===
- Laura Jane Grace – producer
- Marc Hudson – producer, mix engineer, recording engineer, photography
- Atom Willard – producer
- Stephen Marcussen – mastering
- Stewart Whitmore – mastering
- Steak Mtn. – artwork concept and layout
- Bryce Mata – photography
