= Stay Alive (Laura Jane Grace album) =

Studio album by Laura Jane Grace
- Released: October 1, 2020
- Recorded: July 6–9, 2020
- Studio: Electrical Audio
- Genres: Folk punk; power pop
- Length: 29:20
- Label: Polyvinyl

Laura Jane Grace chronology
| Bought to Rot (2018) | Stay Alive (2020) | At War with the Silverfish (2021) |

Professional ratings
Aggregate scores
| Source | Rating |
|---|---|
| Metacritic | 73/100 |
Review scores
| Source | Rating |
| AllMusic | 4/5 stars |
| Clash | 7/10 |
| DIY | 4/5 stars |
| Kerrang! | 4/5 |
| The Line of Best Fit | 4/5 stars |
| Pitchfork | 6.8/10 |

Stay Alive is the debut solo studio album by American singer-songwriter Laura Jane Grace, released on October 1, 2020, through Polyvinyl Record Co. The album was written and recorded during the COVID-19 pandemic, when Grace was left without the ability to record with her band Against Me!, and thus made a solo album instead. The album was recorded over three days in Steve Albini's studio in Chicago. Prior to recording with Albini, Grace was in talks to record the album with Tim Armstrong of Rancid. Stay Alive was released as a surprise album with no promotion, but music videos were released for "The Swimming Pool Song", "Blood & Thunder", and "SuperNatural Possession".

== Track listing ==
All tracks are written by Laura Jane Grace.

| No. | Title | Length |
|---|---|---|
| 1. | "The Swimming Pool Song" | 1:53 |
| 2. | "The Calendar Song" | 2:19 |
| 3. | "Shelter in Place" | 1:58 |
| 4. | "Return to Oz" | 1:50 |
| 5. | "The Mountain Song" | 3:01 |
| 6. | "SuperNatural Possession" | 2:04 |
| 7. | "Hanging Tree" | 2:20 |
| 8. | "Please Leave" | 1:51 |
| 9. | "Why Kant I Be You?" | 2:32 |
| 10. | "Ice Cream Song" | 1:42 |
| 11. | "The Magic Point" | 1:45 |
| 12. | "Blood & Thunder" | 2:05 |
| 13. | "So Long, Farewell, Auf Wiedersehen, Fuck Off" | 1:37 |
| 14. | "Old Friend (Stay Alive)" | 2:17 |
| Total length: | | 29:20 |

== Personnel ==
Credits adapted from the album's liner notes.

- Laura Jane Grace – performance, recording on "SuperNatural Possession" and "So Long, Farewell, Auf Wiedersehen, Fuck Off", cover ashtray photo, back cover dead bird photo
- Steve Albini – recording, mixing
- Bob Weston – mastering
- Katie Hovland – back cover, lyric insert artist photos
- Perry Shall – layout, design
