= I-Empire =

Studio album by Angels & Airwaves
- Released: November 1, 2007
- Recorded: January – September 2007
- Studio: Jupiter Sound
- Genre: Alternative rock; space rock
- Length: 52:54
- Label: Geffen; Suretone
- Producer: Tom DeLonge

Angels & Airwaves chronology
We Don't Need to Whisper (2006)	I-Empire (2007)	Love (2010)

Singles from I-Empire
- 1. "Everything's Magic" Released: September 18, 2007; 2. "Secret Crowds" Released: February 5, 2008; 3. "Breathe" Released: June 20, 2008

I-Empire is the second studio album by alternative rock band Angels & Airwaves. It was officially released worldwide on November 1, 2007 from the Angels & Airwaves website, where it was available for download. It was then released on CD on November 5 in the United Kingdom and Ireland, and on November 6 in the United States and Canada. It is their first album to feature Matt Wachter on bass.

== Production ==
Angels & Airwaves started work on I-Empire in the beginning of 2007. It was the first album ever recorded at Jupiter Sound (Macbeth's studio).

On May 20, 2007, in an interview with Alternative Radio, the band said that the album was 60-70% complete and that the record would be out in October or November 2007. DeLonge also stated that the album would continue the element of the first album, but "times ten" and that in a story, I-Empire would follow We Don't Need to Whisper; We Don't Need to Whisper being a "re-birth" of life, and I-Empire being an album about what you do after the rebirth. It has a slightly more mellow, ambient tone with lyrics focusing more on relationships and less about war and conflict.

On May 30, 2007, DeLonge stated in an interview with Kerrang! that the new album would be named I-Empire and "is as exciting as rock 'n' roll gets!"

On July 29, 2007, as a part of the 'Everybody Hurts' tour, Angels & Airwaves played the studio versions of four new songs from I-Empire to their fans. The songs played were "Secret Crowds", "Sirens", "Lifeline", and "Everything's Magic", along with live acoustic performances of "Everything's Magic", "The Gift", "Good Day", "Do It for Me Now", and "The Adventure". These songs were all recorded and leaked onto the internet, giving fans their first glimpse of I-Empire, along with the acoustic set.

== Release and promotion ==
=== Original release ===
On September 10, 2007, the group revealed the album's artwork. "Everything's Magic" was made available for streaming via the group's Myspace account on August 29, 2007, and was released to radio on September 18. A music video was released for "Everything's Magic" on September 20. The album was delayed multiple times before its official release. DeLonge originally stated that I-Empire would be released on October 16. The release date was later pushed back to October 23. The following day, I-Empire was fully leaked onto the internet, a week before its worldwide release. That same day DeLonge posted his response to the leak on the Angels & Airwaves MySpace. The album was eventually released on November 6 through Geffen and Suretone Records. On November 16, DeLonge announced on Modlife that the band were making a short film for the song "Breathe". The short film for the song was made shortly after, and was later released exclusively to premium Modlife members.

From late January to mid-March 2008, the band embarked on their headlining North American tour, playing sold-out theaters with Meg and Dia, Ace Enders and The Color Fred. "Secret Crowds" was chosen as the second single from I-Empire, although "Call to Arms" was also considered, after receiving lots of positive feedback and decent digital sales. The song impacted radio on February 5. On February 25, "Secret Crowds" aired on MTV2, being the band's second single from the album to hit commercial heights with a music video. It has since gone onto Kerrang! TV and Scuzz in the UK. "Breathe" is the third single taken from the album, and the video was released on June 20, 2008.

=== Vinyl release ===
In January 2016, Tom DeLonge's media company, To the Stars, announced the release of a 180-gram clear vinyl edition of I-Empire, available exclusively to paid members of the company's website. Limited to 775 copies, the pressing was mastered for vinyl with lacquers cut by Stan Ricker and produced by SRC Vinyl; it included bonus acoustic tracks The Adventure and Good Day on side D. Signed copies by DeLonge were offered for an additional fee, with autographs in gold marker on the cover. The edition was housed in a matte-finish gatefold jacket with an 11" x 22" insert.

In early February 2016, SRC Vinyl announced a second pressing on 180-gram opaque gold vinyl, limited to 775 copies and available exclusively through their website. A third pressing on clear with white smoke vinyl followed in June 2016, limited to 1,000 copies.

On January 11, 2017, DeLonge and To the Stars announced via social media and the company's website the Angels & Airwaves 2017 Hope Vinyl Collection, a comprehensive reissue of the band's full discography on 180-gram transparent clear vinyl, including I-Empire. The collection encompassed five full-length albums (We Don't Need to Whisper, I-Empire, Love Parts 1 & 2, The Dream Walker, and Stomping the Phantom Brake Pedal) and three EPs (...Of Nightmares, Chasing Shadows, and To the Stars... Demos, Odds and Ends), totaling twelve LPs. The I-Empire pressing in the set was limited to 500 copies on 180-gram transparent clear vinyl, housed in a limited-edition o-card slipcase with a double-sided die-cut "AVA" logo. Pre-orders opened immediately, with the collection shipping on February 15, 2017, exclusively through To the Stars.

Subsequent pressings of I-Empire on vinyl have included a fourth edition in December 2018 (1,000 copies on orange with maroon haze), a fifth in March 2022 (1,000 copies on "tin" vinyl), and a sixth in May 2025 as part of the Interscope Vinyl Collective (IVC) subscription series (3,000 numbered copies on black & blue opaque mix vinyl, cut at 45 RPM by Levi Seitz at Blackbelt Mastering, with alternate blue color-shift cover art, custom sleeves, new center labels, a bonus acoustic "Everything's Magic", and a 4-pack of collector's photo cards).

== Reception ==
=== Critical reception ===
Professional ratings
Aggregate scores
Source	Rating
Metacritic	54/100
Review scores
Source	Rating
AbsolutePunk.net	44%
AllMusic	3/5 stars
Alternative Press	3/5 stars
Billboard	4/5 stars
IGN	77%
Kerrang!	3/5 stars
NME	3/10
PopMatters	7.5/10
Punknews.org	3.5/5 stars
UnRated	3/4 stars

I-Empire garnered generally mixed reviews from music critics. At Metacritic, which assigns a normalized rating out of 100 to reviews from mainstream critics, the album received an average of 54, based on 13 reviews.

Evan Sawdey from PopMatters said that despite the lyricism of the tracks feeling generic, he praised DeLonge for creating "grandiose pop-rock with a healthy dash of New Wave" that's far away from the aesthetics of his project's debut effort. He concluded that, "Where Whisper came off like an ego-driven side project, I-Empire paints the Angels as a fully-fledged band. Give them time: you may even forget that this was the guy who wrote "All the Small Things" to begin with." Aubin Paul of Punknews.org praised the scaling back of length throughout the track listing that allowed for immediacy in its hooks and melodies, saying that it makes for "a better album, and Angels & Airwaves [is] a better band." AllMusic's Stephen Thomas Erlewine called it "an easier record to like than We Don't Need to Whisper," commending DeLonge for giving his tracks more catchy hooks and immediate attention to the listeners but felt he was in a musical growing phase when crafting more mature content, concluding that "it marks a very small, very tentative progression toward [DeLonge] realizing that he can expand his sonic and emotional horizons without abandoning the pop songcraft that remains his greatest strength." Scott Evil of NME said of the album as a whole: "Angels & Airwaves labour under the illusion that ‘mature’ equals ‘worthwhile’; and that means long, directionless songs swathed in echo pedals and factory-set keyboards."

=== Commercial performance ===
The album debuted at number 9 on the US Billboard 200 chart, with just over 66,000 copies sold in its first week.

== Track listing ==
All lyrics are written by Tom DeLonge; all music is composed by Angels & Airwaves.

No.	Title	Length
1.	"Call to Arms"	5:05
2.	"Everything's Magic"	3:51
3.	"Breathe"	5:34
4.	"Love Like Rockets"	4:50
5.	"Sirens"	4:19
6.	"Secret Crowds"	5:03
7.	"Star of Bethlehem"	2:08
8.	"True Love"	6:08
9.	"Lifeline"	4:16
10.	"Jumping Rooftops"	0:45
11.	"Rite of Spring"	4:22
12.	"Heaven"	6:39
Total length:		52:54

UK and Japanese bonus track
No.	Title	Length
13.	"It Hurts" (live from Del Mar)	4:20

Indie bonus tracks
No.	Title	Length
13.	"It Hurts" (live from Del Mar)	4:20
14.	"The Adventure" (live from Del Mar)	5:18

iTunes bonus track
No.	Title	Length
13.	"The Gift" (acoustic)	3:48

Target and vinyl bonus tracks
No.	Title	Length
13.	"The Adventure" (acoustic)	3:18
14.	"Good Day" (acoustic)	2:46

Best Buy bonus tracks
No.	Title	Length
13.	"Everything's Magic" (acoustic)	3:04
14.	"Do It for Me Now" (acoustic)	3:46

== Personnel ==
Adapted credits from the liner notes of I-Empire.

Angels & Airwaves

- Tom DeLonge – lead vocals, rhythm guitar, keyboards
- David Kennedy – lead guitar, keyboards, synthesizers
- Matt Wachter (credited as Matt Watcher) – bass guitar, synthesizers, backing vocals
- Atom Willard – drums, percussion

Artwork

- Drew Struzan – album cover
- Joshua Ortega – front cover design
- Brendan Raasch – album design, layout
- Miranda Penn – band photos

Production

- Tom DeLonge – producer
- Jeff 'Critter' Newell – co-producer, engineer, sonic manipulation, percussion, band photos
- Roger Joseph Manning Jr. – keyboards
- Tom Lord-Alge – mixer
- Brian Gardner – mastering
- Doug Reesh – guitar and bass technician

== Charts ==
=== Album ===
Chart (2007)	Peak position
Australian Albums (ARIA)	31
Canadian Albums (Billboard)	11
German Albums (Offizielle Top 100)	77
Irish Albums (IRMA)	70
Scottish Albums (OCC)	30
UK Albums (OCC)	29
UK Album Downloads (OCC)	16
US Billboard 200	9

=== Singles ===
Year	Title	Chart	Position
2007	"Everything's Magic"	US Billboard Hot 100	104
2007	"Everything's Magic"	US Modern Rock Tracks	11
2007	"Everything's Magic"	US Pop 100	92
2007	"Everything's Magic"	UK Singles Chart	107

== Release history ==
Country	Release date
Various	November 1, 2007
South Korea	November 5, 2007
United Kingdom	November 5, 2007
Canada	November 6, 2007
United States	November 6, 2007
