= We Don't Need to Whisper =

2006 studio album by Angels & Airwaves

Studio album by Angels & Airwaves
- Released: May 23, 2006
- Recorded: March 2005 – April 2006
- Studios: Neverpants Ranch, San Diego, California; Studio 606, Hollywood, California
- Genres: Arena rock; pop rock; power pop
- Length: 49:48
- Label: Geffen
- Producer: Tom DeLonge

Angels & Airwaves chronology
We Don't Need to Whisper (2006)	I-Empire (2007)

Singles from We Don't Need to Whisper
- 1. "The Adventure" Released: May 18, 2006; 2. "It Hurts" Released: July 24, 2006 (UK); 3. "Do It for Me Now" Released: July 24, 2006; 4. "The War" Released: October 27, 2006

We Don't Need to Whisper is the debut studio album by the American rock band Angels & Airwaves. Recorded at Neverpants Ranch in San Diego, California, and produced by guitarist and vocalist Tom DeLonge, the album was released on May 23, 2006, through Geffen Records. In February 2005, DeLonge, who wanted to spend more time with his family, quit Blink-182 after months of heated exchanges and increasing tension within the trio and spent three weeks in isolation, contemplating his life, career, and future in music.

Inspired by personal crises and global events, We Don't Need to Whisper was conceptualized as DeLonge taught himself to play instruments and created his own home studio. He recruited his longtime friend and guitarist David Kennedy of Box Car Racer, as well as drummer Atom Willard and bassist Ryan Sinn to form Angels & Airwaves, who were primarily inspired by arena rock groups such as U2 and the Police. DeLonge's later public statements regarding the band's music prompted media interest and concern from his relatives and family.

We Don't Need to Whisper peaked at number four on the Billboard 200 and has since sold nearly 800,000 copies. Three of the four singles released in promotion of the album reached the top 20 on the Modern Rock Tracks chart, with "The Adventure" peaking at number five. It received largely mixed reviews from music critics, many of whom celebrated the album's obvious musical influences but found its contents rather pretentious. A documentary film based on the recording process of the album and early history of the band, Start the Machine, was released in 2008. It was their only album to feature bassist Ryan Sinn.

== Background ==
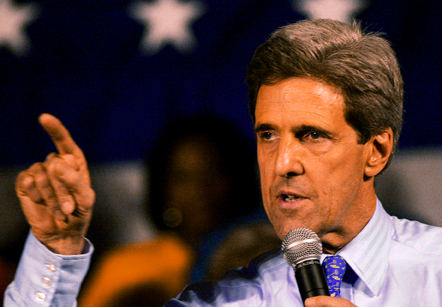
DeLonge's time spent on the campaign trail with US presidential candidate John Kerry in 2004 created an "epiphany" within the musician to change the world.

Blink-182 consisted of guitarist Tom DeLonge, bassist Mark Hoppus and drummer Travis Barker, and by 2004 had been regarded as the most successful pop-punk act of the time since the releases of Enema of the State (1999) and Take Off Your Pants and Jacket (2001). During its brief hiatus in 2002, DeLonge suffered a herniated disc in his back and collected several darker musical ideas he viewed unsuitable for the band; the ideas were used in supergroup Box Car Racer's self-titled album, recorded with assistance from Hazen Street guitarist and longtime friend David Kennedy. Box Car Racer was intended as a one-time experimental project, but it evolved into a full-fledged band involving Barker. The side project would cause personal conflicts between DeLonge and Hoppus; the latter was not a member of the supergroup and felt betrayed. The moody subject matter on Box Car Racer was incorporated into the sound of Blink-182, who explored experimentalist elements on their eponymous fifth studio album (2003). After the success of Box Car Racer, DeLonge declined a solo recording deal offered by Geffen Records because he believed it would cast negative light on Blink-182, but it loomed over the band in addition to growing internal tension.

While the trio embarked on a European tour the following fall, DeLonge felt increasingly quarreled both about his creative freedom within the group and the toll touring took on his personal life. He eventually expressed his desire to take a half-year respite from touring to spend more time with family matters, a decision that Hoppus and Barker asserted was a lengthy interruption. DeLonge did not blame his bandmates for disappointment with his requests, but was dismayed that they apparently could not understand them. He protested Meet the Barkers, a reality television series starring Barker which was produced for a 2005 premiere, and disliked surveillance cameras, feeling his personal privacy was invaded. Blink-182 agreed to perform at Music for Relief's Concert for South Asia, a benefit show to aid victims of the 2004 Indian Ocean earthquake, but further arguments that ensued during rehearsals rooted in the band members' increasing paranoia and bitterness toward each other. DeLonge judged the band's priorities to be "mad, mad different" and claimed that they had simply grown apart as they aged. This communication breakdown led to heated exchanges resulting in his departure from the group, which Geffen announced on February 22, 2005, would be going on an "indefinite hiatus", and he would not speak to Barker or Hoppus for several years, although he called the latter his greatest friend.

DeLonge underwent a complete reassessment of his prime concerns in the aftermath of the band's break-up—a move "bearing the hallmarks of a nervous breakdown"—and went on a three-week "spiritual journey" in complete isolation away from his family, contemplating his life, career, and future in music. DeLonge was psychologically hurt by the band's dissolution, likening it to a divorce and calling it a "traumatic experience" and a "disaster." He had been known for his role in the Blink-182 as "the low-brow prankster" and wanted to restart his career without worrying whether fans would find him funny. The background of Angels & Airwaves was based on DeLonge's endorsement of John Kerry in the 2004 presidential election, travelling the political circuit with the Democratic Party candidate; DeLonge was inspired by Kerry's need for widespread reform and likened his presidential campaign to a drug, remarking later that it "really changed [me]." He rediscovered the epiphany developed during his tour with Kerry and applied it to the philosophy of Angels & Airwaves, while he redefined himself as he learned to play piano and self-produce and formed his own home studio.

== Recording and production ==
DeLonge had to assemble Angels & Airwaves after recording several demos in his home studio. Following Blink-182's disestablishment, he declined offers from highly prolific musicians to collaborate on their developing material and recruited longtime friend and Box Car Racer guitarist David Kennedy. Atom Willard and Ryan Sinn soon followed, but the latter dropped out and was reluctant to join another band soon after the collapse of his previous group, the Distillers. Kennedy found himself in a similar situation with his band Hazen Street, and found the new environment refreshing. Uncertain on joining the band, DeLonge offered Sinn a job at Macbeth Footwear's warehouse, where he worked until he permanently committed to the band in August. The band members put forth several sayings and rules, including "Friends and family first; band second."

We Don't Need to Whisper was inspired by a mix of both personal developments and global events. During production, DeLonge studied World War II, which he considered the "last great war clearly a battle between good and evil." He saw America enter a post-war period of prosperity, and perceived it as an analogy for possibilities in his life. The album was encouraged by other personal crises as well, such as DeLonge's father's diagnosis of leukemia and his brother's deployment to Iraq; DeLonge criticized the Iraq War as unnecessary. Although the band deemed the project lightly progressive rock-influenced, the album lacks guitar solos the genre is commonly known for in place of melodies inspired by 1970s rock bands, such as Pink Floyd, Rush and Led Zeppelin. DeLonge was influenced by and listened to Peter Gabriel, U2, the Police and the Cure, all who were artists that achieved massive success and inspired DeLonge's desire to reach the widest audience possible.

== Composition ==
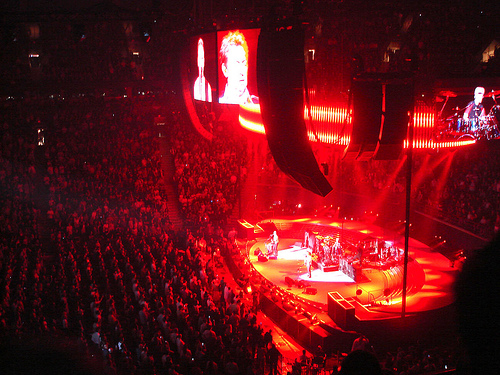
The record was inspired by the arena rock genre and bands such as the Police, pictured above.

The underlying message the band intended for We Don't Need to Whisper is that the future could become a utopia. Opening track "Valkyrie Missile" opens We Don't Need to Whisper with a cinematic organ melody, 1980s-influenced guitars and a quote from an astronaut: "Anybody out there?". "Distraction" follows and is filled with hand claps and a keyboard melody over verses lamenting death and destruction. "Do It for Me Now" originated from a beat DeLonge created in 2004 for rapper Talib Kweli, who turned the opportunity down; the Morse code beat was later adapted by the band and stimulated DeLonge's vision of the song being the soundtrack to "young lovers watching the sunrise." "The Adventure" is an "exhilarating ode to a beckoning future with a huge guitar sound reminiscent of The Cure." The song was motivated by a friend whose marriage was falling apart when his wife committed adultery. The situation had a deep impact on DeLonge in that he spent a night up crying for him when he wrote the track. "A Little's Enough" was inspired by a religious concept in which a God came to bring positive change on Earth when it faces terrorism, war, or famine.

"The War", an anthem about the Iraq War and its death toll, is succeeded by "It Hurts", a track about a friend of DeLonge's with a cheating girlfriend. "It's a terrible situation where my friend is being crushed from the inside out by all the manipulative stuff she's doing and this song's about that."

During development, DeLonge often took his daughter Ava to an ice cream shop in San Diego, and on one occasion, they wandered into a next-door toy store, and DeLonge was enchanted by the sound of a pink toy piano, which he would eventually purchase. He placed the piano in his shower and recorded "Start the Machine", which attempts to illustrate the state of "being on a boat as you're leaving a city in flames", only to find a tropical island and a more alluring place ahead. DeLonge considered it a reference to his time with Blink-182 and central to Angels & Airwaves' theme that "something special [can come] out of destruction."

== Promotion ==
"They were quiet and I was talking, talking, talking and they stopped me. My manager was looking at me going, 'What is wrong with you?'. I looked at him, took a deep breath, and went, 'I don't know'. They were saying I wasn't the same person anymore, they said I was totally different. They were addressing things that were said in the press, how I was acting, who feverishly I was working on the band and the movie and all these different things. I got teary-eyed and looked at them and said, 'All the shit that's driving me absolutely crazy is making me feel like I'm losing my mind.'"

— Tom DeLonge on his intervention following his press statements

In September 2005, after spending months avoiding publicity, DeLonge announced his new Angels & Airwaves project and promised "the greatest rock and roll revolution for this generation." His statements—containing predictions that the album would usher in an "entire new culture of the youth" and lead to the band's dominance—were regarded as highly grandiose in the press and mocked and set sources in his belief that his album would become a recording critics would refer to two decades on as the album of the 2000s, or the sole successor to what he considered the most recent "important" album, Nirvana's Nevermind (1991). He also said that he began writing Whisper immediately following the release of Blink-182, seeing it as a "force to be reckoned with" which he "knew [he] had to beat" while wishing to take the project to "that Police level, that Joshua Tree level". He observed in interviews that prior to Blink-182's hiatus, he thought Angels & Airwaves would become a highly important band. The other band members did not refute DeLonge's press statements, viewing them as tongue-in-cheek and offering little substance.

Thoroughly utilized by the band, DeLonge often discussed minor details and plans for accompanying films and other promotional matters, and his managers approached him having an "intervention" in which they disquietingly questioned his frame of mind. His ambitious beliefs were intensified by his addiction to Vicodin, a drug which he used due to his back problem and did not try out again when he was unable to obtain it for a week, hallucinating and deep in withdrawal.

== Reception ==
=== Critical reception ===
Professional ratings
Aggregate scores
Source	Rating
Metacritic	53/100
Review scores
Source	Rating
AllMusic	2.5/5 stars
Alternative Press	4/5 stars
The A.V. Club	C−
Entertainment Weekly	B−
IGN	8/10
Punknews.org	3/5 stars
Rolling Stone	3/5 stars
Spin	(mixed)
Uncut	(mixed)

We Don't Need to Whisper received largely mixed reviews from contemporary music critics at the time of its release. Alternative Press was generally the most enthusiastic of the positive reviews, considering its influence on rock bands in 2006. The publication found the album to not be abounding or thought-provoking and commented: "While the lyrics might be DeLonge at his most soul-searching, the music is built for nothing smaller than football stadiums." IGN was also very positive in their assessment of the record, writing, "This album is like a post-millennial concept record that beckons to be listened to with the lights dimmed and the headphones clamped tightly around your aural receptors. [...] It may not be your cup of tea, but kudos to the quartet for not merely re-treading the [blink-182] market with more mature lyrics." Entertainment Weekly journalist Leah Greenblatt gave the album a B− rating, commending its obvious influences while also criticizing DeLonge's vocals. It stated that his vocals might improve to resemble those of Robert Smith heard on tracks like "It Hurts", but likened it to a high school student with a job at Del Taco communicating with a drive-through microphone.

Rolling Stone writer Christian Hoard summarized the record and the mixed reviews simply as "DeLonge yanks heartstrings with so-so results" and saw the atmospheric elements as excessive. Spin had a similar sentiment: "Here, his three sidemen elevate [DeLonge's] emo tendencies to something grander and more timelessly romantic—though somewhat less exciting. Blender scrutinized the composition of the album as it contains the "duller" aspects of Blink-182 accompanied with U2-influenced guitar chimes. Many critics described the album to be pretentious and contrasted Angels & Airwaves with Blink-182. The A.V. Club journalist Kyle Ryan described his experience with We Don't Need to Whisper as 50 minutes of DeLonge demonstrating his musical skills. English magazine Uncut discerned his departure from Blink-182 and the album's serious tone. AllMusic writer Stephen Thomas Erlewine praised the differences in musical style between both bands, but remained ambivalent about the album and commented that "It may not make for a successful record, but it does make for an interesting one, particularly in how DeLonge's desire to be taken seriously has led him to use the serious music of his adolescence as a signifier that he's serious now, but We Don't Need to Whisper is too doggedly dour and amorphous to be more than a curiosity."

=== Commercial performance ===
The album sold 127,000 copies in its first week, and was certified Gold by the RIAA. It was nominated for an MTV Video Music Award for Best New Artist in a Video, Best Special Effects in a Video and Best Editing in a Video for "The Adventure" as well as Best Band of 2006 for We Don't Need to Whisper.

== Acoustic EP ==
We Don't Need to Whisper Acoustic - EP

EP by Angels & Airwaves
- Released: August 25, 2017
- Length: 18:25
- Label: To the Stars
- Producer: Tom DeLonge

Angels & Airwaves chronology
Chasing Shadows (2016)	We Don't Need to Whisper Acoustic - EP (2017)	Lifeforms (2021)

On August 25, 2017, the band released an EP of acoustic renditions of We Don't Need to Whisper's first four songs. At the time of its release, DeLonge had been planning to direct a feature film titled Strange Times, which was set to feature new music from the band. The EP was recorded and released as a means to "give the fans something while the band works on the soundtrack". The EP was also released in memory of the band's former producer, Jeff "Critter" Newell, who died in 2012.

By the time of the EP's recording, the band had now consisted of DeLonge and Ilan Rubin. Sinn left the band in 2007, while Willard left in 2011. From 2014 to 2018, Kennedy had taken a hiatus from the band and would return in the months following the EP's release. Additionally, the band released a lyric video for the acoustic version of "The Adventure", which contained footage of the album's original studio sessions.

Track listing
No.	Title	Length
1.	"Valkyrie Missile" (acoustic)	4:09
2.	"Distraction" (acoustic)	5:06
3.	"Do It for Me Now" (acoustic)	4:24
4.	"The Adventure" (acoustic)	4:50
Total length:		18:29

== Track listing ==
All lyrics are written by Tom DeLonge; all music is composed by Angels & Airwaves.

No.	Title	Length
1.	"Valkyrie Missile"	6:39
2.	"Distraction"	5:36
3.	"Do It for Me Now"	4:33
4.	"The Adventure"	5:12
5.	"A Little's Enough"	4:45
6.	"The War"	5:07
7.	"The Gift"	5:02
8.	"It Hurts"	4:14
9.	"Good Day"	4:30
10.	"Start the Machine"	4:10
Total length:		49:48

International bonus track
No.	Title	Length
11.	"Do It for Me Now" (Live from FUSE 7th Ave. Drop)	4:39

UK bonus tracks
No.	Title	Length
11.	"The Machine"	3:42
12.	"Do It for Me Now" (Live from FUSE 7th Ave. Drop)	4:39

iTunes bonus track
No.	Title	Length
11.	"The Adventure" (Live from Whispers Studio)	6:04

Wal-Mart bonus track
No.	Title	Length
11.	"It Hurts" (Live from FUSE 7th Ave. Drop)	4:21

== Personnel ==
=== Angels & Airwaves ===
- Tom DeLonge – lead vocals, rhythm guitar, keyboards
- David Kennedy – lead guitar, keyboards, synthesizers
- Ryan Sinn – bass guitar, backing vocals
- Atom Willard – drums, percussion

=== Additional musicians ===
- Roger Joseph Manning, Jr. – keyboards

=== Production ===
- Tom DeLonge – producer
- Jordan Schur – executive producer
- Tom Lord-Alge – mixing engineer
- Jeff 'Critter' Newell – assistant producer, programmer, photographer, mixing engineer on "The War"
- Danny Lohner – assistant producer, programmer on "Distraction"
- Doug Reesh – guitar/bass technician
- Shilo – artwork
- Brian Gardner – mastering engineer

== Charts ==
=== Weekly charts ===
Weekly chart performance for We Don't Need to Whisper
Chart (2006)	Peak position
Australian Albums (ARIA)	8
Austrian Albums (Ö3 Austria)	30
Canadian Albums (Billboard)	3
Dutch Albums (Album Top 100)	62
French Albums (SNEP)	82
German Albums (Offizielle Top 100)	18
Irish Albums (IRMA)	23
Scottish Albums (Official Charts)	5
New Zealand Albums (RMNZ)	29
UK Albums (Official Charts)	6
US Billboard 200	4

=== Year-end charts ===
Year-end chart performance for We Don't Need to Whisper
Chart (2006)	Position
US Billboard 200	150

== Certifications ==
Certifications for We Don't Need to Whisper
Region	Certification	Certified units/sales
United Kingdom (BPI)	Silver	60,000^{^}
United States (RIAA)	Gold	500,000^{^}
^{^} Shipments figures based on certification alone.

== Release history ==
Release dates and formats for We Don't Need to Whisper
Country	Release date
Australia	May 20, 2006
South Korea	May 22, 2006
United Kingdom	May 22, 2006
Canada	May 23, 2006
United States	May 23, 2006
