= Matt Wachter =

American musician (born 1976)

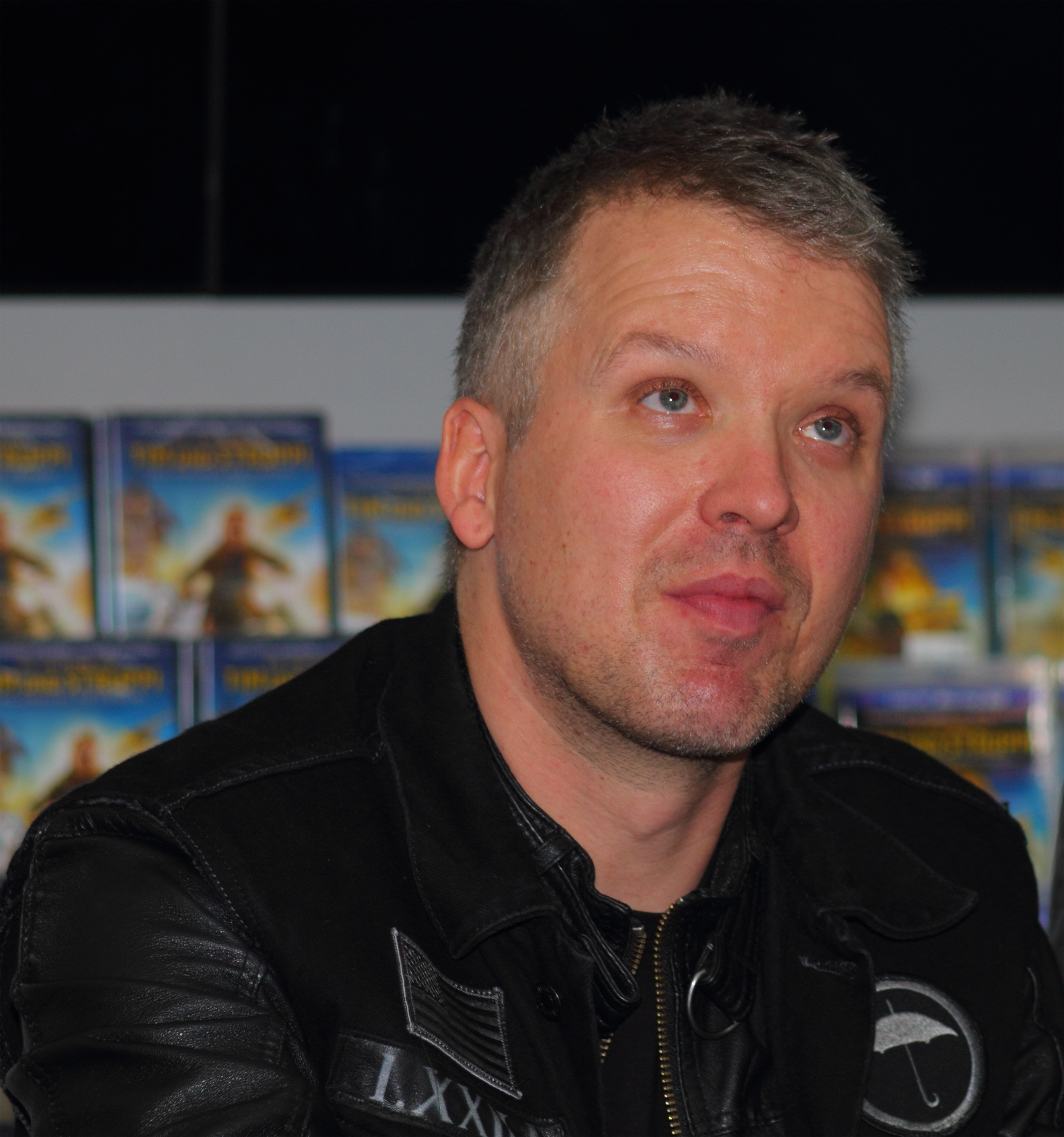
- Wachter in 2012

Background information
- Born: Matthew Walter Wachter; January 5, 1976 (age 50); Pottsville, Pennsylvania, U.S.
- Genres: Alternative rock; punk rock
- Occupation: Musician
- Instruments: Bass; keyboards
- Years active: 2001–2019
- Labels: Virgin; Immortal; Geffen
- Formerly of: Thirty Seconds to Mars; Angels & Airwaves

Matthew Walter "Matt" Wachter (born January 5, 1976) is a retired American musician, best known for playing bass in the alternative rock bands Thirty Seconds to Mars and Angels & Airwaves.

== Biography ==
Wachter was born in Pottsville, Pennsylvania. As a child, he spent most of his time with his family in New Jersey and Boston. An active child, he participated in baseball and soccer, taking up swimming as well, he also went to United States Space Camp, along with Space Academy. His interest in music bloomed when he was around five years old, and between the ages of five and eight, he experimented with various instruments, focusing primarily on the piano and drums.

Wachter reached the peak of his musical interest around high school and spent most of his time playing in bands. He picked up the bass, he stated, because he "wanted to play in a band, and the band needed a bass player." He had no previous experience with the bass, the closest being experimenting with the guitar. He credited former Metallica bassist, the late Cliff Burton, as his inspiration for wanting to play the bass guitar.

Wachter attended the Berklee College of Music in Boston and moved to Los Angeles after graduating to pursue his career in music.

Wachter was rumored to have worked in a slaughterhouse, but confessed in an interview that he and his bandmates made up the story to stir up an otherwise dull interview.

== Career ==
=== Thirty Seconds to Mars (2001–2007) ===
Wachter joined Jared Leto, Shannon Leto, and Solon Bixler, rounding out the Thirty Seconds to Mars line-up, in 2001. Bixler was replaced with Tomo Milicevic in 2003.

Wachter often stands in a "pigeon-toed" stance (both feet turned in toward each other) when he plays his bass, and stares down at his feet. He says doing this allows him to focus on what he's playing and keeps him from being distracted by fans.

In the early days of Thirty Seconds to Mars, Wachter complained of consistent headaches after performing, but no pain while he was on stage. After a visit to the hospital and a CT scan, it was discovered that he developed a concussion from frequent head-banging on stage. This prompted his mother to suggest he "wiggle his hips like Elvis", as mentioned in the fan yearbook. The head-banging has since stopped.

The first two dates of the 2006 "Forever Night, Never Day" headlining tour had to be postponed after Wachter hurt himself. The injury resulted from changing one of his car's headlights (or as Shannon Leto says "He was left alone with a pair of scissors." to which Wachter replied "A pair of scissors and a light bulb. I'll leave the rest to your imagination."), pushing the tour back an additional two weeks. The band issued press release to fans on March 2.

While on tour in El Paso, Texas, on March 1, 2007, Jared Leto announced to the arena that Wachter would be playing his last show with the band. He dedicated the song, "R-Evolve", to Wachter. After that, Tim Kelleher filled in as the bassist on the March 2 show in Dallas, Texas.

=== Angels & Airwaves (2007–2012) ===
Following the departure of Ryan Sinn from the band on 23 April 2007, Wachter joined Angels & Airwaves in Sinn's place. He was later confirmed as a band member, and worked with Angels & Airwaves on their second album I-Empire. The band released their third studio album, titled Love, in February 2010, along with its follow-up Love: Part Two in 2011. On June 24, 2014, Tom Delonge posted a photo of Matt stating his intention to leave the band to focus on his family life at home, stating "Matt still might join us later down the road somewhere and somehow."

On March 9, 2017, a video posted to Tom DeLonge's Instagram account showed Wachter playing bass, to which DeLonge states he has "been looking for [Wachter]". This led to speculation that Wachter had returned to Angels & Airwaves. This was confirmed by DeLonge on April 18, 2018, posting that both Wachter and guitarist David Kennedy had rejoined Angels & Airwaves and would appear on the next album. When the band released new music in May 2019, however, Wachter was absent from both the band's new press photos and from the list of members listed on the band's Facebook page. Neither the band nor Wachter have released statements concerning the departure, although producer Aaron Rubin stated that Wachter was not involved with any of the band's new music.

=== Other works ===
Wachter serves as an occasional guest host on Get The Fuck Up Radio. The radio show is hosted by two of his friends, Aaron Farley and Jeremy Weiss (who is friends with Tad) and is featured on Little Radio, out of Los Angeles.

In mid-2009, Wachter recorded bass on all tracks for the album Big Noise by Street Drum Corps, released in November 16, 2010.

== Personal life ==
On May 14, 2009, Matt and Libby (née' Lawson) had a child.

== Discography ==
Title	Release	Label	Band
A Beautiful Lie	2005	Immortal/Virgin	Thirty Seconds to Mars
I-Empire	2007	Geffen	Angels & Airwaves
Love	2010	To The Stars Records	Angels & Airwaves
Love, Part Two	2011	To The Stars Records	Angels & Airwaves
