= Everything's Magic =

Single by Angels & Airwaves

from the album I-Empire
- B-side: "Do It for Me Now" (Acoustic)
- Released: September 18, 2007
- Genre: Space rock; pop punk
- Length: 3:55
- Label: Geffen; Suretone
- Songwriters: Tom DeLonge; David Kennedy; Matt Wachter; Atom Willard
- Producer: Tom DeLonge

Angels & Airwaves singles chronology
"The War" (2006)	"Everything's Magic" (2007)	"Secret Crowds" (2008)

"Everything's Magic" is a song by the American rock band Angels & Airwaves. It was the lead single from their second studio album, I-Empire (2007), released on Geffen Records. The song impacted radio on September 18, 2007. It peaked at number eleven on Billboard's Hot Modern Rock Tracks chart in 2007, making it their second-biggest hit.

== Critical reception ==
Aubin Paul from Punknews.org noted how both the bass and guitar lines were similar to The Cure's "Close to Me" and The Edge of U2 respectively but said that the combination works to make for "a memorable and fun song." NME writer Scott Evil said the track had promise with its melody being reminiscent of Blink-182 but found it "suffocated by the sheer bloody dreariness of the delivery."

== Charts ==
Chart (2007–2008)	Peak position
UK Singles (Official Charts Company)	107
US Bubbling Under Hot 100 (Billboard)	4
US Hot Modern Rock Tracks (Billboard)	11
US Pop 100 (Billboard)	92
