= Love: Part Two =

Studio album by Angels & Airwaves
- Released: November 11, 2011
- Recorded: June–September 2010
- Genre: Alternative rock; space rock; progressive rock
- Length: 48:44
- Label: To the Stars Records
- Producer: Tom DeLonge

Angels & Airwaves chronology
Love (2010)	Love: Part Two (2011)	The Dream Walker (2014)

Singles from Love: Part Two
- 1. "Anxiety" Released: August 11, 2011; 2. "Surrender" Released: October 21, 2011

Love: Part Two is the fourth studio album by alternative rock band Angels & Airwaves, released November 11, 2011, via the band's own label, To the Stars Records. It follows 2010's Love, and its release coincides with that of the band's Love feature film, which includes music from the album. The first single from the album and respective music video, "Anxiety", was released on August 11, 2011. "Surrender" impacted radio on January 31, 2012. It is the final album to feature Atom Willard as the band's drummer and Matt Wachter as the band's bassist.

Along with its predecessor, Love: Part Two is a concept album that explores themes such as "love, God, and hope."

== Production ==
Band frontman Tom Delonge had confirmed prior to release, that a second studio album in the Love project along with the Love film are set for release in November 2011, after a few delays dating back to 2010. He has also revealed that the upcoming studio album would be titled Love: Part Two and would include 45 minutes of extra music. On April 9, 2011, Delonge confirmed via Modcam that Love: Part Two would be released on November 1, 2011. Delonge has described the album as better than the first part of Love and also confirmed on an online discussion forum that there would be a box set with the two Love albums and a DVD of the movie. The supporting tour for Love: Part Two took place in spring 2012.

The first single to be released was "Anxiety", which premiered following Love Live on August 10, 2011. The music video for "Anxiety" was then released on YouTube on August 11, 2011.

On October 31, 2011, the band released another song from Love: Part Two, "Surrender". Surrender was to be one of the main themes of WWE's WrestleMania 29 PPV event. However, "Surrender" was not featured in any WWE promotional material for WrestleMania beginning with the turn of the year.

This was the last album to feature drummer Atom Willard (who left the band prior to the release of the album), longtime engineer Jeff "Critter" Newell (who had died on New Year's Eve of 2011) and bassist Matt Wachter (who left the band in 2014 but briefly returned from 2018 to 2019).

== Reception ==
Professional ratings
Aggregate scores
Source	Rating
Metacritic	56/100
Review scores
Source	Rating
AllMusic	3.5/5 stars
The A.V. Club	B
Rolling Stone	1.5/5 stars
Spin	5/10
Sputnikmusic	3/5 stars
Ultimate-Guitar.com	3.7/10

The album got a mixed score of 56 out of 100 on Metacritic, and Rolling Stone gave the album a one-and-a-half star review, stating that the album "[soared] ever closer to the sun, with defiant nonsense" and continued to state that although the album sounded exultant, "There's nothing here to be triumphant about". Music website Alter the Press! awarded the album four stars out of five, heralding it as a "welcome addition to the Angels and Airwaves discography" and going on to say it's a "solid, catchy and innovative rock record."

According to MTV, the album entered the Billboard 200 charts at number 30 with an estimated 16,000 sales.

"Surrender" reached number 35 on the US Alternative Songs chart.

== Track listing ==
All lyrics are written by Tom DeLonge; all music is composed by DeLonge, David Kennedy, Matt Wachter and Atom Willard

No.	Title	Length
1.	"Saturday Love"	4:20
2.	"Surrender"	4:30
3.	"Anxiety"	5:03
4.	"My Heroine (It's Not Over)"	3:45
5.	"Moon as My Witness"	4:14
6.	"Dry Your Eyes"	5:00
7.	"The Revelator"	4:52
8.	"One Last Thing"	2:54
9.	"Inertia"	4:30
10.	"Behold a Pale Horse"	4:04
11.	"All That We Are"	5:36
Total length:		48:43

== Personnel ==
Band

- Tom DeLonge – lead vocals, rhythm guitar, keyboards
- David Kennedy – lead guitar, keyboards, synthesizers, backing vocals on track 10
- Matt Wachter – bass guitar, synthesizers, backing vocals
- Atom Willard – drums, percussion

== Charts ==
Chart (2011)	Peak position
US Billboard 200	30
