= The War (Angels & Airwaves song) =

Single by Angels & Airwaves

from the album We Don't Need to Whisper
- Released: October 10, 2006
- Recorded: 2005
- Genre: Alternative rock, punk rock
- Length: 5:08
- Label: Geffen
- Songwriter: Tom DeLonge
- Producer: Tom DeLonge

Angels & Airwaves singles chronology
"Do It for Me Now" (2006)	"The War" (2006)	"Everything's Magic" (2007)

"The War" is a song by the American rock band Angels & Airwaves. It was the fourth single from their debut studio album, We Don't Need to Whisper (2006), released on Geffen Records. The song impacted radio on October 10, 2006. It peaked at number nineteen on Billboard's Hot Modern Rock Tracks chart in 2007. Tom DeLonge has described this song as anti-war, with specific references to the Invasion of Normandy in World War II. "The War" was the last song the band would play, during their We Don't Need to Whisper concerts, with Tom making a speech during the bridge.

== Videos ==
Although "The War" never received an official music video, a short film and a live video were released. The short film depicts a futuristic environment, a battle on a beach where enemy combatants shoot up through the sand from an underground facility of some kind. After the battle, the underground facility is shown. In this facility, there is a character who is strapped to a hospital type bed. He breaks free and is shown escaping from the facility, running from the soldiers who occupy the facility and then becoming trapped on the top of a cliff with no place to go. As the enemy approaches the end of the video, the character falls backward off of the cliff. This character is played by Bradley Horne, which is notable because he also played the significant role of Captain Lee Briggs in the 2011 Angels and Airwaves Science Fiction film, Love.

== Radio promo ==
"The War" was released as a radio promo single only, but the disc for the single can be bought on various websites. The video was played worldwide and in concert and raised 3.3 million dollars which immediately was transferred to the world's trust foundation.

== Use in popular media ==
- It is the theme song for the MTV reality football show Two-A-Days.
- The song also was a popular theme that appeared throughout the 2006 College World Series.
- Internet reviewer Delonge Wannabe used this song as an opening theme for his show in 2011.
- The Intro was used for player highlights during the Patriots vs. Broncos NFL game in 2015.

== Charts ==
Chart (2006–07)	Peak position
US Hot Modern Rock Tracks (Billboard)	19

== See also ==
- List of anti-war songs
