= Modlife =

American internet services company

- Website type: Social network, live broadcast, music network, content hosting
- Available in: English
- Owner: Tom DeLonge
- Website: Modlife
- Advertising: Banner ads
- Registration: Optional
- Launched: November 2007 (beta); June 2008 (full launch)
- Current status: Inactive

Modlife was a company owned by musician Tom DeLonge that used a customizable software platform to monetize the numerous aspects of a creative artist's work. Founded in 2007, Modlife created new revenue streams for content creators by rewarding fans with special products and experiences, including a high level of interactivity between artists and fans. In June 2014, the company was based in San Diego, California, United States.

== History ==
Following the introduction of file-sharing technology—including Napster at inception—DeLonge and his blink-182 bandmates were considering a "plan B" in regard to generating income from their music. The band's 1999 album, Enema of the State, had sold one million copies within two months of its release, but DeLonge explained in 2014: "Napster was just hitting and the epicenter of our fan base was suburbia where everyone had the newest Apple computer."

Then, in May 1999, DeLonge launched the Loserkids.com online retailer that promoted and monetized the lifestyle that was strongly associated with blink-182 and its large number of fans. In 2014, the company explains that it sells "relevant action sports and music influenced brands online."

In 2005, DeLonge met Joe Brisbois to develop the idea of making an interactive video game based on Angels & Airwaves music. In addition to the video game concept, the two explored a variety of other ideas including what eventually became Modlife. Modlife was launched in 2007 and, by this time, album sales were not providing a substantial income for musicians, while third-party distributors involved in the sale of concert tickets and merchandise were not overcoming the issue due to their sales percentages. DeLonge's initial intention was to use Modlife to launch the To The Stars concept, which was described in 2014 as a "transmedia" company that works in different media formats, including books, music and film. However, To The Stars was not launched until March 2014.

Following its inception, Modlife signed numerous prominent artists to its roster that, in 2014, includes Kanye West, Pearl Jam and Nine Inch Nails, as well as DeLonge's own musical projects, blink-182 and Angels & Airwaves. Angels & Airwaves used the platform to further monetize a 2012 tour, whereby the band sold VIP packages for fans that doubled the income they received. In December 2014, DeLonge reported that direct-to-consumer multimedia packages sold via Modlife contributes 40 percent of revenue from each new Angel and Airwaves release.

Pearl Jam used Modlife to sell concert tickets directly to the members of its fan club, Ten Club, and used a lottery system provided by DeLonge's platform. The American tour promotion company, Live Nation, developed its own version of Modlife after witnessing the Pearl Jam experience.

After the launch of To The Stars was announced, DeLonge explained in a June 2014 interview that his new company was informed by the Modlife experience, and serves to fill a gap that became evident:

That [To The Stars] was me asking how you can monetize the arts because the music is free. We figured out by blending physical and digital products together, you're going to download the album but you still want the limited edition poster and the vinyl together. When we did that with Modlife, we had a good handle on what the business would be but not the art.

As of February 2017, the Modlife website is now defunct.

== Services ==
In December 2014, Modlife was described by the company on its website in the following manner:

[A] customizable, direct-to-consumer technology that delivers a complete set of tools that seamlessly integrate a multi-level online business model. With our single account management system, both clients and customers alike can easily manage their online experience with a single login across multiple channels.

The platform offers the following services:

- User account management
- Customization
- e-commerce
- Digital & physical fulfillment
- Product dev. & manufacturing
- Direct-to-consume
- Membership paywalls
- Fanclub ticketing
- VIP packages
- Pay-per-view
- Backend content management
- Social engagement
- Third-party integration
- Mobile optimization
- Statistics & reporting
- Consulting
- Mobile app development

== User sites ==
In November 2008, the company launched "usersites," which allow registered users to create their own microsites within Modlife. Each user can design their own page, post blogs, photos and videos, add friends, and communicate with other fans. Usersites also have a "Top Ten" section, where they add their favorite pieces of content from anywhere on Modlife, and recommend site content to friends.

== Roster ==
- Angels & Airwaves, November 2007
- Timmy Curran, June 2008
- Forever the Sickest Kids, July 2008
- From First to Last, August 2008
- The Color Fred, August 2008
- Finch, September 2008
- Jessica Chobot, October 2008
- Runner Runner, November 2008
- The Silent Comedy, December 2008
- Transfer, December 2008
- Louis XIV, February 2009
- Mayday Parade, March 2009
- Run Doris Run, March 2009
- Alex Woodard, April 2009
- Hit the Lights, April 2009
- Keep a Breast, April 2009
- Envy on the Coast, April 2009
- Attack Attack!, April 2009
- Korn, May 2009
- Moon Rising, May 2009
- From Jupiter, May 2009
- Blink-182 Pre-Sale, May 2009
- Honor Bright, June 2009
- W.R.O.N.G, June 2009
- I Know What I Saw, June 2009
- Closure in Moscow, June 2009
- Scary Kids Scaring Kids, June 2009
- Of Mice & Men, July 2009
- Family Force 5, July 2009
- Maylene and the Sons of Disaster, July 2009
- Ryan Russell, July 2009
- The Vault July 2009
- The White Stripes, July 2009,
- The Raconteurs, July 2009
- The Dead Weather, July 2009
- Third Man Records, July 2009
- Rat Sound, August 2009
- Searchlight, August 2009
- Macbeth Footwear, October 2009
- Kanye West
- Nine Inch Nails
- Coheed and Cambria
- Taking Back Sunday
- Pearl Jam
- The Offspring
