= The Adventure =

Single by Angels & Airwaves

from the album We Don't Need to Whisper
- Released: May 18, 2006
- Recorded: 2005
- Length: 5:12
- Label: Suretone; Geffen
- Songwriter: Tom DeLonge
- Producers: Tom DeLonge; Danny Lohner

Angels & Airwaves singles chronology
"The Adventure" (2006)	"It Hurts" (2006)

Audio sample
- file; help

Music video
- "The Adventure" on YouTube

"The Adventure" is a single recorded by American rock band Angels & Airwaves. It was released on May 18, 2006, through Geffen Records, as the lead single from their debut studio album, We Don't Need to Whisper (2006). The ballad received increased attention when it aired on a Smallville trailer. After the season finale of Smallville aired, "The Adventure" climbed to #30 on Amazon. The track was also played in the crowd warm-up session before Barack Obama's presidential election rallies in 2008.

During concerts, DeLonge has often used both "Down" and "I Miss You" by Blink-182 as part of an extended intro to the song.

"The Adventure" is also featured as downloadable content in the karaoke game Lips and in the music game Rock Band. It is also a playable song in the music games, Band Hero and Rocksmith 2014 (DLC). The song was also featured on a Ford and X-Play commercial. It was also used in the WWE Network documentary special "WWE 24: Goldberg". DeLonge has often stated that "The Adventure" is his favorite song by the band.

== Background ==
"The Adventure" was inspired by singer Tom DeLonge’s friend whose marriage was falling apart. Singer DeLonge felt touched by their story that he ended up shedding some tears on a certain night.

== Track listing ==
1. "The Adventure" (Album version) – 5:12
2. "The Adventure" (Radio edit) – 4:40

== Acoustic version ==
An acoustic version of "The Adventure" appears as a B-side on the "Everything's Magic" single. Another version can be found on the band's 2017 We Don't Need To Whisper acoustic EP, featuring four acoustic versions of songs off their debut album.

This song was included on MuchMusic's Big Shiny Tunes 11.

== Short film ==
The song was officially released on February 20, 2006, as an internet-only short film. Although DeLonge had stated differently, the same version of the song that had been leaked previously after someone hacked into DeLonge's email account. It is shot on 8mm black and white, with the film having a science fiction feel to it. DeLonge stated that "...it kind of looks like George Lucas' THX 1138, where it's all beautiful naked women and fast cars and concrete and glass architecture." The subsequent short-film, "It Hurts", was released on April 18 and continues the story where "The Adventure" left off.

== Music video ==
The music video for the song was directed by The Malloys. It was shot in March 2006 was released on April 5. The video was leaked onto the Internet soon after its release. "The Adventure" begins with the band boarding a spacecraft to pick up their instruments and begin playing, and then moves to DeLonge walking in a field. It ends with clips of World War II and DeLonge walking off into the distance in a meadow with the sky lit with planets. The video was nominated for Best Effects by the 2006 MTV Video Music Awards, including Best New Artist and Best Editing. It was also number one on MuchTopTens: "Top Ten Out of This World Videos" on December 14, 2006.

== Charts ==
=== Weekly charts ===
Weekly chart performance for "The Adventure"
Chart (2006)	Peak position
Germany (GfK)	82
Scottish Singles Sales (Official Charts)	15
Ireland (IRMA)	47
UK Singles (Official Charts)	20
US Billboard Hot 100	55
US Alternative Airplay (Billboard)	5
US Pop 100 (Billboard)	51

=== Year-end charts ===
Year-end chart performance for "The Adventure"
Chart (2006)	Position
US Alternative Songs (Billboard)	17
