= Shave (magazine) =

Shave Magazine
- September 2010 Cover
- Categories: Men's Lifestyle, Entertainment, Motoring, Technology, Travel, Fitness and Grooming
- Frequency: Monthly
- Founded: 2008
- Country: Canada
- Based in: Edmonton
- Language: English
- Website: Shave

Shave is both a print and online men's-lifestyle magazine created by Shave Media Group. The founder is Mike Zouhri. The magazine also syndicates content through news portals, such as MSN.
