= It Hurts (Angels & Airwaves song) =

Single by Angels & Airwaves

from the album We Don't Need to Whisper
- Released: July 24, 2006
- Recorded: 2005–2006
- Genre: Alternative rock
- Length: 4:15 (single)
- Label: Geffen
- Songwriter: Tom DeLonge
- Producer: Tom DeLonge

Angels & Airwaves singles chronology
"The Adventure" (2006)	"It Hurts" (2006)	"Do It for Me Now" (2006)

"It Hurts" is the second single in Europe by Angels & Airwaves' from the debut album We Don't Need to Whisper. A short-film for this song was released on April 18 on the Angels & Airwaves official website, which continues where the video for "The Adventure" left off and continues with "The Gift". During the time of its first release, it peaked on the UK charts at #59. The song was also released as a downloadable track for the video game Rock Band on May 6, 2008.

== Track listing ==
- CD
1. "It Hurts"
2. "The Adventure" (live)
- 7" vinyl
1. "It Hurts"
2. "The Gift" (live)

Tom DeLonge: "I have a friend who's got a girlfriend that's the cheating type. It's a terrible situation where my friend is being crushed from the inside out by all the manipulative stuff she's doing and this song's about that."

== Charts ==
Chart (2006)	Peak position
UK Singles (Official Charts)	59
