= Macbeth Footwear =

Southern Californian brand of apparel

- Type: Subsidiary
- Industry: Footwear
- Founded: 2002; 24 years ago
- Founder: Tom DeLonge
- Headquarters: Carlsbad, California
- Key people: Alec Schroeder
- Products: Shoes; Clothes; Hats
- Parent: Saban Brands
- Website: macbeth.com

Macbeth Footwear is a Southern Californian brand that specializes in footwear, apparel, and accessories. It was established in 2002 and is known for offering vegan and organic products. One of the founders of Macbeth Footwear is Tom DeLonge, who is also a member of the band Blink 182.

In June 2014, Macbeth Footwear was acquired by Saban Brands, a company that specializes in the acquisition and development of entertainment and consumer brands. Since then, Macbeth Footwear has focused its market primarily on Southeast Asia, particularly Indonesia, Malaysia, and the Philippines.

While Macbeth Footwear initially focused on streetwear, it has recently expanded its product line to include hoodies, jeans, and jackets. The brand continues to sell a range of products that align with its values of sustainability, veganism, and organic materials.
