= Ryan Sinn =

Ryan Sinnott
- Genres: Punk rock, alternative rock, metal
- Instrument: Bass
- Years active: 2001–present

Ryan Sinn is an American musician. He is currently the bassist for the punk rock band The Distillers. He currently resides in San Diego, California.

Sinn joined The Distillers after their first album. At the time he only played guitar, but he learned the bass parts on their previous album in four days and was asked to join the band after he auditioned. He appeared on the group's second and third albums. The band experienced some turmoil in 2005, and Sinn announced that he had left the band in August of that year. He would later return in 2018 when the band reunited.

After leaving The Distillers, Sinn was recruited by Blink-182 member Tom DeLonge to join his new project, Angels & Airwaves. He played bass on the band's 2006 release We Don't Need to Whisper. However, in April 2007, rumors spread that Sinn had left Angels & Airwaves due to difficulties with the rest of the band.

Sinn was playing bass with The Innocent, a thrash metal group consisting of drummer Brooks Wackerman (Bad Religion), vocalist Brandan Schieppati (Bleeding Through) and guitarist Dave Nassie (No Use for a Name). He played in a band called Blackpool in 2010. He occasionally played bass with the band Stephen Rey and the Slicks, when active. Sinn sang for Bhorelorde.

Sinn is also currently the music director for a San Diego, California-based 501(c)(3), The Free Art Foundation.
