= Love (2011 film) =

- Theatrical release poster
- Directed by: William Eubank
- Written by: William Eubank
- Produced by: Angels & Airwaves; Mark Eaton; Daniel Figur; Vertel Scott; Nate Kolbeck
- Starring: Gunner Wright
- Cinematography: William Eubank
- Edited by: Brian Berdan; Scott Chestnut
- Music by: Angels & Airwaves
- Production companies: New Dog Media; Griffin Interplanetary Studios
- Distributed by: National CineMedia
- Release dates: February 2, 2011 (SBIFF); August 10, 2011 (United States)
- Running time: 84 minutes
- Country: United States
- Language: English
- Budget: $500,000
- Box office: $1.5 million

Love is a 2011 American science fiction drama film produced and scored by the alternative rock band Angels & Airwaves. The film is the directorial debut of filmmaker William Eubank. The film's world premiere took place on February 2, 2011, at the 26th Annual Santa Barbara International Film Festival and the film was later featured in the Seattle International Film Festival, FanTasia 2011, and a number of other festivals. The film was screened in 460 theatres across the United States on August 10, 2011, in the Love Live event.

Love portrays the personal-psychological effects of isolation and loneliness when an astronaut becomes stranded in space and through this, emphasizes the importance of human connection and love. Additionally, it touches on the fragility of humanity's existence (explored through a dying Earth-apocalyptic doomsday scenario) inspired by the cautions of Carl Sagan in Pale Blue Dot and considers the importance of memories and stories as humanity's legacy.

== Plot ==
During an 1864 battle of the American Civil War, a lone Union soldier, Captain Lee Briggs (Bradley Horne), is dispatched on a mission to investigate a mysterious object reported to Union forces. He leaves to venture on the mission.

Fast forward to 2039, United States Astronaut Lee Miller (Gunner Wright) is dispatched to the International Space Station (ISS) as a one-man skeleton crew to determine its safety and make any required adjustments, after it had been left unattended for two decades due to unspecified reasons. Shortly after his arrival, significant disturbances transpire on Earth, eventually leading Miller to lose contact with CAPCOM and finding himself stranded in orbit alone, forced to helplessly watch events on Earth from portholes 200 miles above his home planet. Miller struggles to maintain his sanity while in isolation by interacting with Polaroid pictures of former ISS crew members left aboard the ship.

Experiencing power issues, Miller moves into an unpressurised module of the space station to perform repairs and discovers the 1864 journal of Briggs. Miller reads Briggs's account of the war and becomes enthralled by the mysterious object he is searching for, not realizing he will soon become more familiar with the very same object, and not by accident.

By 2045, after six years without CAPCOM contact and a deteriorating oxygen system in the ISS, Miller puts on a space suit and goes for a spacewalk, deciding that it would be easier for him to detach his tether and slowly drift towards Earth and to burn in the atmosphere than slowly suffocate to death on board the ISS. He finds, however, that he is unable to go through with his suicide.

Miller is seen still aboard the ISS, presumably much later: his hair has grown extremely long, and he is extensively tattooed. He has drawn sketches of people and battles of the Civil War from the journal all over the interior of the ISS. The cramped quarters of the space station have become a rat's nest symbolic of his diminished sanity. He then seems to be contacted from outside the ISS, and to receive instructions to dock and transfer over. He does so, and seems to arrive in a giant uninhabited structure of distinctly human making. It is unclear whether this is real or imagined by Miller, who is now insane.

Miller wanders around until he happens upon a server mainframe where he finds a book titled "'A Love Story' As Told by 'You'". Inside this book, he finds pictures of Captain Lee Briggs with his discovery, a gigantic cube-like alien object that may have helped advance human society. In the index of the book, Miller finds a reference to himself and types it into the computer prompt. He then finds himself inside a generic hotel room, where a disembodied voice says:

How are you doing, Lee? Sorry about this projection, but it's the only way we could reach you. We can't tell you how relieved we are to have you here. Now, before we get ahead of ourselves, we have to tell you something. You're the last one, it's all gone. We understand how you might feel. Connection is perhaps the most cherished thing any being can have. That's the thing. That's why we've been listening. The place you see here is a scrapbook of sorts, a collection of memories and mementos of mankind's brief existence. It's a good thing we found you. We look forward to meeting you, Lee.

During the speech, we see the same cube-like object in space in the year 2045. The viewer is left to assume that this object has 'obtained' Lee Miller and is speaking directly to him. The film ends with the voice of a computer speaking of human connections and love.

== Production ==
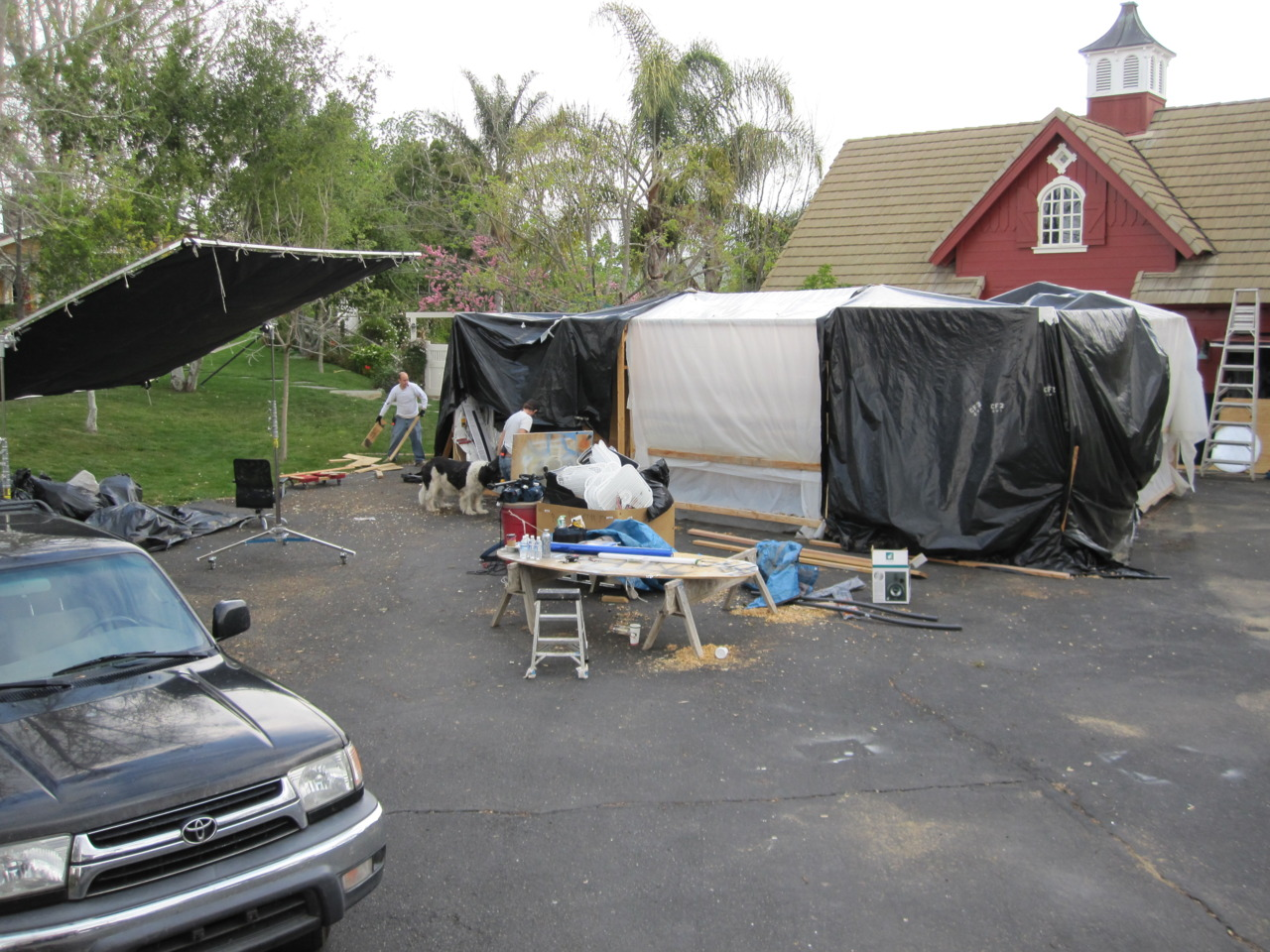
The ISS set built in a driveway, seen protected from the rain by plastic tarps

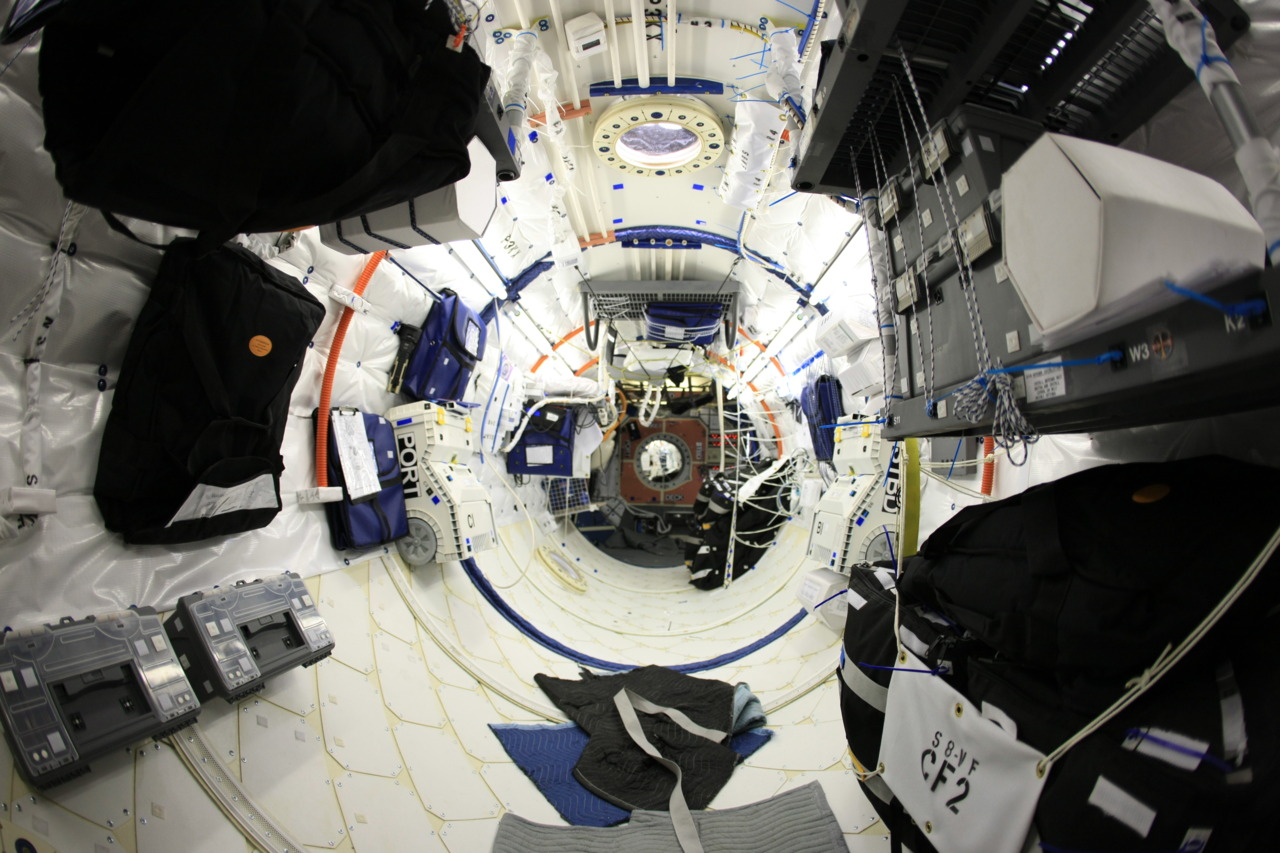
Interior of the space station set

The space station set was built in William Eubank's parents' backyard. In a making-of video uploaded to his Vimeo account, Eubank details the construction of the set and lists materials such as packing quilts, MDF, pizza bags, Velcro, insulation, Christmas lights, and other salvaged material as components to the ISS set. According to Tom DeLonge, the production was going to rent the space station from another movie but instead opted to construct it from salvaged materials for budget reasons.

Early teasers were released in 2007 and 2009. On January 10, 2011, the film's final trailer was released on Apple Trailers. The release of this trailer saw coverage on several industry websites.

== Release ==
=== Festival circuit ===
I can tell you, honestly, the movie is ten times better than I thought it would be. But it's not meant to compete with Transformers. This is an art-house film and no band has really done this in a very long time. So we're hoping that we catch some people off guard and we're also hoping that we do something that is very credible as far its artistic acumen goes.

— Tom DeLonge, April 11, 2010

The film's world premiere took place on February 2, 2011, at the 26th Annual Santa Barbara International Film Festival, with additional screenings on February 3, 4 and 5 at the Metro 4 and Arlington Theater. The film was screened for free on February 11 at the Riviera Theatre in Santa Barbara as one of eleven films chosen as "Best of the Fest".

The 2011 Seattle International Film Festival featured Love in both their Sci-Fi and Beyond Pathway and their New American Cinema program. The film played on May 21 at the Pacific Place Theatre and May 22 at the SIFF Cinema. The film played a third time, June 11, at the Egyptian Theatre.

Love was accepted into the 2011 Fantasia International Film Festival held in Montreal, Quebec. Its FanTasia screening on July 18 in Hall Theatre, as part of the festival's Camera Lucida Section, marked the film's international premiere. The film also screened in Athens, Lund, London, Nantes, South Korea, Spain, Israel, and elsewhere.

Date	Festival	Location	Awards	Link
Feb 2–5, Feb 11	Santa Barbara International Film Festival	Santa Barbara, California US	Top 11 "Best of the Fest" selection	sbiff.org
May 21–22, Jun 11	Seattle International Film Festival	Seattle, Washington US		siff.net
Jul 18, Jul 25	Fantasia Festival	Montreal, Quebec Canada	Special Mention "for the resourcefulness and unwavering determination by a director to realize his unique vision"	FanTasia
Aug 10 – Love Live Nationwide Screening US
Sep 16	Athens International Film Festival	Athens, Attica; Greece	Best Director	aiff.gr
Sep 19	Lund International Fantastic Film Festival	Lund, Skåne; Sweden		fff.se
Sep 28	Fantastic Fest	Austin, Texas; US		FantasticFest.com
Oct 9	London Int. Festival of Science Fiction Film	London, England; UK	Closing Night Film	Sci-Fi London
Oct 9, Oct 11	Sitges Film Festival	Sitges, Catalonia; Spain		Sitges Festival
Oct 1, Oct 15	Gwacheon International SF Festival	Gwacheon, Gyeonggi-do; South Korea		gisf.org
Oct 17, Oct 20	Icon TLV	Tel Aviv, Central; Israel		icon.org.il
Oct 23	Toronto After Dark	Toronto, Ontario; Canada	Best Special Effects; Best Musical Score	torontoafterdark.com
Nov 11	Les Utopiales	Nantes, Pays de la Loire; France		utopiales.org
Nov 12, Nov 18	Indonesia Fantastic Film Festival	Jakarta, Bandung; Indonesia		inaff.com
Nov 16–18	American Film Festival	Wrocław, Lower Silesia; Poland		AFF Poland

=== Limited release ===
Love was shown nationwide on August 10, 2011.

=== Home media ===
Angels & Airwaves released a box set containing Love, the soundtrack to the film, Love Part I, and the band's fourth studio album Love Part II on November 8, 2011.

== Reception ==
On review aggregator Rotten Tomatoes, the film has an approval rating of 60% based on 15 reviews, with an average rating of 5.4/10.

At the Santa Barbara International Film Festival, the film was originally slotted for three showings but two additional showings in the Arlington Theatre were added after some original showings sold out.

Dennis Harvey, for Variety, wrote "[The film's] spiritual abstruseness and the script's myriad other ambiguities might infuriate in a film less ingeniously designed on more tangible fronts. But Love delights with the detail of its primary set as well as in accomplished effects, consistently interesting yet subservient soundtrack textures (the sole original song is reserved for the closing-credit crawl) and a brisk editorial pace ..."

Dustin Hucks, for Ain't It Cool News, wrote "Love can at times get very broad with scenes, dialogue, and flow ... if you're keen on clarity and the linear, Love is going to leave you frustrated. For others, however, – the challenge of understanding what is what may lead to a desire for repeat viewings, which for me – is a lot of fun ... This is a film that's clearly not for everyone – but has a lot to offer the Inception and Moon crowds."

Hucks continued to say Love was one of the most visually exciting low-budget films he had seen in some time and concluded with an overall endorsement: "Love is well worth seeking out in theaters – but don't miss it on DVD if you don't get the opportunity to view it in theaters."

== See also ==
- Apollo 13, a 1995 film dramatizing the Apollo 13 incident
- Gravity, 2013 3D science-fiction space drama film
- Moon, a 2009 British science fiction drama film
- List of films featuring space stations
