= To The Stars Inc. =

American company

- Formerly: To The Stars Academy of Arts & Sciences Inc.
- Type: Private
- Industry: Entertainment, science, aerospace
- Founded: 2017; 9 years ago
- Founder: Tom DeLonge; Harold E. Puthoff; Jim Semivan
- Headquarters: San Diego, California, United States
- Key people: Luis Elizondo; Steve Justice; Chris Mizer; Christopher Mellon
- Products: Books, TV shows, films, albums, information, research
- Website: tothestars.media/pages/research

To The Stars Inc., formerly known as To The Stars Academy of Arts & Sciences Inc., is a San Diego-based company co-founded by Tom DeLonge (guitarist of Blink-182 and Angels & Airwaves), Harold E. Puthoff (parapsychologist), and Jim Semivan (author). The company, which is composed of aerospace, science, and entertainment divisions, has produced music recordings, books, television shows and films. A focus of the company is the promotion of UFOs and other fringe science.

== History and funding ==
The company was founded in 2017 as a public benefit corporation by Jim Semivan, Harold E. Puthoff, and Tom DeLonge. The Entertainment Division was created by acquiring DeLonge's previous media company, To the Stars, Inc.

In September 2017, the company began offering $50 million worth of public stock through a Regulation A+ equity crowdfunding campaign. According to SEC filings, as of October 2018 only $1 million of those shares had been sold and the company had a $37.4 million deficit, largely from a stock incentive plan for its employees, prompting Ars Technica and Vice to question its financial sustainability.

In 2022, the company rebranded from To The Stars Academy of Arts & Science and became known more simply as To The Stars.

== Entertainment ==
The entertainment leg of To the Stars, often referred to as To the Stars Media, publishes albums, books, TV shows and films.

To the Stars, Inc., the original company folded into the current entity in 2017, was announced in 2014 as a record label which debuted with Angels & Airwaves' fifth studio album The Dream Walker and DeLonge's first solo album, To the Stars... Demos, Odds and Ends.

To the Stars began releasing books, graphic novels and children's picture books in 2015, many of which were co-published by Simon & Schuster. Most of the company's books deal with topics of the supernatural, ufology and science fiction. The publishing division most prominently publishes novels in the Sekret Machines fictional series, co-authored by DeLonge and A. J. Hartley, as well as the Sekret Machines non-fiction companion series Gods, Man & War co-authored by DeLonge and Peter Levenda. It also publishes the space-based series Cathedrals of Glass by Hartley, the young adult series Poet Anderson by DeLonge and Suzanne Young, and the young adult adventure series Strange Times by DeLonge and Geoff Herbach.

The company co-released the short animated film Poet Anderson: The Dream Walker in 2014, but its first major project was the History Channel series Unidentified: Inside America's UFO Investigation in 2019. A feature film based on the Strange Times book series was in production, but it was repurposed into a television series for Turner Broadcasting System (TBS). To the Stars has also started production on a documentary TV series and a feature film for the Sekret Machines franchise.

Most recently, the company produced Tom DeLonge's feature directorial debut, Monsters of California (2023), and the animated series Breaking Bear for Tubi, and Sekret Machines for TV with Legendary.

== Promotion of UFOs and fringe science ==
The science and aerospace divisions are devoted to the "outer edges of science" such as investigating unidentified flying objects. Harold E. Puthoff described their goals as "imagine having 25th-century science this century." One of their potential projects is an "electromagnetic vehicle."

Vice reported that the company would participate "in the investigation of UFOs and other fringe science projects" and that "many of the technologies or phenomena being researched by the company are based on highly speculative theories that toe the line of pseudoscience". To the Stars has detailed the risks involved with this research to potential investors, including possible failure to produce results in areas such as beamed energy propulsion launch systems and telepathy.

Despite the company's work being primarily associated with ufology, Luis Elizondo stated: "None of us at TTSA consider ourselves ‘Ufologists’ or part of the ‘Ufology culture,’ in fact, most of us come from a U.S. government background (both Defense and Intelligence)." Vice reported that the company's "partnership with the U.S. Army may mean that it fancies itself as a military contractor", but that the organization "swings between being contenders for military contracts and a UFO research organization". Elizondo left the company in late 2020.

=== The VAULT ===
The "Virtual Analytics UAP Learning Tool" (VAULT) is a public-facing database of UFO sightings. The VAULT team collects, analyses and provides their authentication of UFO sightings, most famously reported in the media as having been obtained through declassified government materials.

Three videos from the VAULT taken during the USS Nimitz UFO incident and the USS Theodore Roosevelt UFO incidents were publicly confirmed by the US Navy in September 2019 as authentic videos taken by Navy pilots. The videos were part of a campaign by former intelligence officer Luis Elizondo, who at the time was associated with To the Stars, who said that he wanted to shed light on the Advanced Aerospace Threat Identification Program, a secretive Department of Defense operation to analyze reported UFO sightings. In April 2020, the same footage released by the company was subsequently declassified and officially released by the Navy.

The company, with assistance from Christopher Mellon, who worked formerly for the Senate Intelligence Committee and the Department of Defense, engaged congress and arranged classified congressional hearings with the pilots involved in the incidents aimed at understanding potential threats to aviators.

=== ADAM Research Project ===
The company's ADAM Research Project is promoting what they believe to be an "extraterrestrial" metal for commercial and military applications.

In July 2019 the company stated it had acquired and was studying "potentially exotic materials" as part of its Acquisition & Data Analysis of Materials (ADAM) research project. Steve Justice, To The Stars's COO and former head of Advanced Systems at Lockheed Martin's Skunk Works said in a statement that "the structure and composition of these materials are not from any known existing military or commercial application” and that the materials would be studied in an attempt to reverse engineer them. Regarding the origin of the materials he stated: “they've been collected from sources with varying levels of chain-of-custody documentation, so we are focusing on verifiable facts and working to develop independent scientific proof of the materials' properties and attributes." In its SEC filing, the company is recorded as having paid $35,000 for several items including "six pieces of Bismuth/Magnesium-Zinc metal" and a piece of aluminum.

According to the company, the metals are believed to be from an unidentified flying object, and were previously "retained and studied" by ufologist Linda Moulton Howe. Moulton Howe claimed in 2004 that the metals become a “lifting body” when subjected to electromagnetic radiation, but TTS recognized this claim was not substantiated and stated they were working on "[verifying] facts and working to develop independent scientific proof of the materials' properties and attributes." Today, however, she claims she has had the samples tested by Carnegie Science's Department of Technical Magnetism in 1996 and again by Harold E. Puthoff and others on several occasions. According to a letter from Puthoff in 2012 the tests were unable to prove the alien origin of the samples or any "interesting/anomalous outcome" but suggested that one additional test was remaining that required special equipment which was not readily available. The company has partnered with research labs founded by Puthoff to study the materials further. Critics say there is no evidence to support the claim that the materials are "otherworldly in origin" or that they may be "scientifically important". Commenting on similar reports of "Alien Alloys", American Chemical Society expert panel member Richard Sachleben considers such claims "quite impossible". According to Sachleben, "I don't think it's plausible that there's any alloys that we can't identify". May Nyman of Oregon State University Department of Chemistry criticized claims of extensive research to identify an unknown alloy, saying, "if we had such mysterious metals, you could take it to any university where research is done, and they could tell you what are the elements and something about the crystalline phase within a few hours." Chris Cogswell, who holds a PhD in Chemical Engineering and hosts the Mad Scientist Podcast, states that “the chances of it being important scientifically are extremely slim" and suggested that the Bismuth/Magnesium-Zinc pieces may be slag from an industrial process such as the Betterton-Kroll process.

On October 17, 2019, the company announced it entered into a cooperative research and development agreement with the United States Army Combat Capabilities Development Command. The five-year contract will focus on "inertial mass reduction, mechanical/structural meta materials, electromagnetic meta material wave guides, quantum physics, quantum communications, and beamed energy propulsion." According to the U.S. Army, no public funding will go to the group, but at least $750,000 will be provided in support and resources for developing and testing To the Stars technologies. The contract states that To the Stars will provide samples in its possession of “metamaterials”, any data or “obtained vehicles" that use “beamed energy propulsion,” and any information or technology related to “active camouflage” for testing and analysis of potential application on Army ground vehicles. Doug Halleaux, a spokesperson for the U.S. Army Combat Capabilities Development Command Ground Vehicle Systems Center, has stated that the US government has approached To the Stars since “If materials represented in the TTSA ADAM project are scientifically evaluated and presented with supporting data as having military utility by the TTSA, it makes sense to look deeper here.” According to Halleaux, the Army is also interested in the results of a collaboration between To the Stars and TruClear Global, a company that creates custom video screen billboards, aimed at providing "advanced technology solutions to United States Government clientele."

== Published works ==
=== Books and graphic novels ===
Sekret Machines

- Sekret Machines: Book 1 – Chasing Shadows (2016) (with A. J. Hartley)
- Sekret Machines: Gods (2017) (with Peter Levenda)
- Sekret Machines: Book 2 – A Fire Within (2018) (with A. J. Hartley)
- Sekret Machines: Man (2019) (with Peter Levenda)
- Sekret Machines: War (2024) (with Peter Levenda)

Cathedrals of Glass

- Cathedrals of Glass: A Planet of Blood and Ice (2017)
- Cathedrals of Glass: Valkrys Wakes (2020)

Poet Anderson

- Poet Anderson: ...Of Nightmares (2015)
- Poet Anderson: ...In Darkness (2018)

Strange Times

- Strange Times: The Curse of Superstition Mountain (2015)
- Strange Times: The Ghost in the Girl (2016)

Other

- The Lonely Astronaut on Christmas Eve (re-release) (2016)
- Who Here Knows Who Took My Clothes? (2018)

=== TV shows and films ===
- Poet Anderson: The Dream Walker (2014)
- Unidentified: Inside America's UFO Investigation (2019–2020)
- Breaking Bear (2026)
- Untitled Strange Times TV show (TBA)
- Untitled Sekret Machines documentary series (TBA)
- Untitled Sekret Machines film (TBA)

=== Music albums ===
- Angels & Airwaves – The Dream Walker (2014)
- Tom DeLonge – To the Stars... Demos, Odds and Ends (2015)
- Angels & Airwaves – ...Of Nightmares (2015)
- Angels & Airwaves – Chasing Shadows (2016)
