= Liam Gerrard =

British actor and voiceover artist

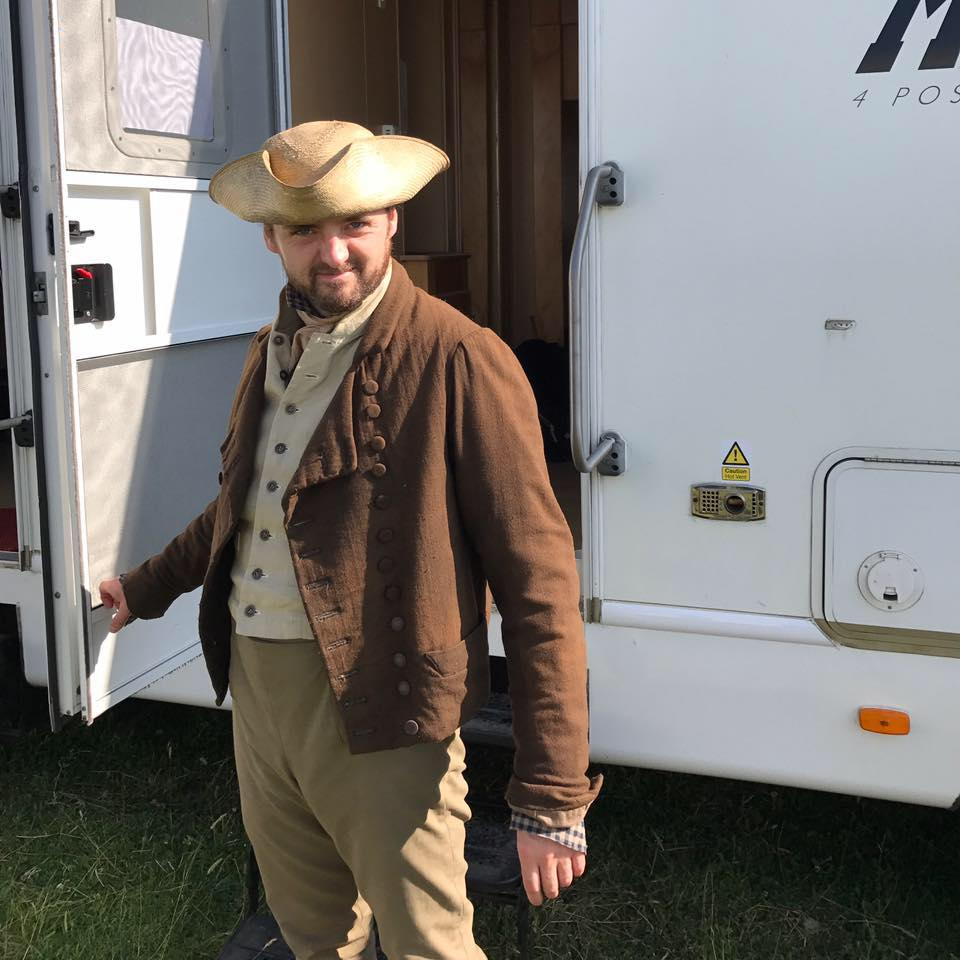
- Gerrard on the set of Peterloo (2018)
- Born: Kingston Upon Hull, England
- Education: Mountview Academy of Theatre Arts; University of East Anglia (MA); University of Lancaster (B.A.)
- Occupation: Actor
- Years active: 2005–present

Liam Gerrard is a British-Irish film, television and theatre actor. He is also a voice-over artist and audiobook narrator. He is best known as the villain 'The Square Squire' in the show Odd Squad and for Walter Tull: Britain's First Black Officer, Peterloo and Coronation Street. He has narrated over 250 audiobooks.

== Early life ==
Gerrard was born and grew up in Kingston upon Hull before moving to Dubai in his early teens studying at the English College Dubai, before studying at Lancaster University and training at Mountview Academy of Theatre Arts.

== Career ==
Gerrard made his film debut in the 2007 Hollywood film Death Defying Acts playing a reporter. He made his television debut in 2008 appearing in the television series Hollyoaks. He has appeared in numerous episodes of Coronation Street as the semi-recurring Fire Chief. Since 2024 he plays the Square Squire in the PBS / BBC children's television series Odd Squad. In 2008 he starred in 6 WKD Original Vodka comedy television commercials leading their have you got a WKD side? campaign.

Gerrard has appeared in numerous stage productions throughout the UK. In 2006, he appeared in two British Shakespeare Company productions; A Midsummer Night's Dream and Romeo and Juliet. The productions toured the United Kingdom and transferred to Ramme Gaard under the patronage of Petter Olsen. In 2008 he joined Northern Broadsides and toured the UK with a production of Romeo and Juliet. He then played the juvenile lead in Theatre by the Lake's world premiere of Melvyn Bragg's The Maid of Buttermere. He subsequently appeared in two more productions at Theatre by the Lake; Tom's Midnight Garden and The Night Before Christmas. Other notable stage appearances include: Miss Julie the 4-hand David Eldridge adaptation, directed by Sarah Frankcom at the Royal Exchange;(also starring Maxine Peake, Joe Armstrong and Carla Henry), A Christmas Carol at both the Stephen Joseph Theatre and in later years at The Dukes, Jekyll & Hyde at the New Wimbledon Theatre, Will Scarlett in Robin and Marian at the New Vic Theatre. In 2015 he appeared in the Royal Lyceum Theatre (Edinburgh) production of Caucasian Chalk Circle. The show won four Critics' Awards for Theatre in Scotland. The Telegraph hailed the show 'A Triumph'. He is one of the youngest actors to play the title role of Prospero in London theatre, in the 2013 Watford Palace production of The Tempest. In 2014, he appeared in the 4-hander triptych piece Symphony written by Ella Hickson, Nick Payne and Tom Wells for Nabokov and Soho Theatre. The show won a Musical Theatre Network award for best new musical at the Edinburgh Fringe then toured the UK before transferring to London's West End. In late 2018 he played Tom Snout (Wall) in the Crucible Theatre production of A Midsummer Night's Dream.

Gerrard also works as a voiceover artist. The animated educational film Walter Tull: Britain's First Black Officer, in which Gerrard provided voice work, was nominated for a British Academy Children's Award in the Learning – Secondary category. He has narrated over 250 audiobooks including the Tom Delonge series Poet Anderson. In March 2024 he was nominated for an Audie Award in Hollywood for The Adventures of Finn MacCool & Other Irish Folk Tales which he edited and narrated. He narrates the Katherine Addison fantasy series The Cemeteries of Amalo. Gerrard has discussed his work in audiobook narration in an interview on the How Do You Say That podcast.

== Filmography (selected TV / film) ==
- Odd Squad
- Coronation Street
- Peterloo
- Walter Tull: Britain's First Black Officer
- Death Defying Acts
- Butterfly
- Arch
- Cancer Scare
- Toolwire
- Hollyoaks
- Hollyoaks Later
- The Loft - post production

== Selected theatre ==
- A Midsummer Night's Dream – Crucible Theatre
- Robin Hood – New Vic Theatre
- The Caucasian Chalk Circle – Lyceum Theatre, Edinburgh
- Symphony – Soho Theatre, Nabokov
- The Life and Times of Mitchell and Kenyon – Oldham Coliseum Theatre
- A Christmas Carol – The Dukes (Lancaster)
- Miss Julie – Royal Exchange, Manchester
- The Tempest – Watford Palace Theatre
- Soul Man (Rigoletto) – Stephen Joseph Theatre
- Tom's Midnight Garden – Theatre by the Lake
- A Christmas Carol – Stephen Joseph Theatre
- The Night Before Christmas – Theatre by the Lake
- The Maid of Buttermere – Theatre by the Lake
- Romeo and Juliet – Northern Broadsides
- A Midsummer Night's Dream – Derby Playhouse
- Romeo and Juliet – British Shakespeare Company
- Jekyll & Hyde – New Wimbledon Theatre
- The Beauty Queen of Leenane
- Mrs. Warren's Profession – Judi Dench Theatre

== Audiobook selected bibliography ==
- The Cemeteries of Amalo Trilogy by Katherine Addison
  - The Witness for the Dead by Katherine Addison
  - The Grief of Stones by Katherine Addison
  - The Tomb of Dragons by Katherine Addison
- Poet Anderson: The Dream Walker series by Tom DeLonge
  - Poet Anderson ...of Nightmares by Tom DeLonge
  - Poet Anderson: ...In Darkness by Tom DeLonge
- Pink Mist by Owen Sheers
- The Seven Basic Plots by Christopher Booker
- Shtum by Jim Lester
- The Secret Life by Andrew O'Hagan
- The Near East by Arthur Cotterell
- Little Caesar by Tommy Wieringa
- The Enigma of Reason by Hugo Mercier and Dan Sperber
- Rome: An Empire's Story by Greg Woolf
- Palaces of Pleasure by Lee Jackson
- The Infinite Desire for Growth by Daniel Cohen
- The Demon in Democracy by Ryszard Legutko
- Game of Thrones Psychology by Travis Langley
- Deception of A Highlander Series:
  - Deception of A Highlander
  - Possession of a Highlander by Madeline Martin
  - Enchantment of a Highlander by Madeline Martin
- Brutal by James Alerdice
- The Inspired Leader by Andy Bird
- Human by Mark Britnell
- Nicotine by Gregor Hens
- The Hidden Village by Imogen Matthews
- Humankind: Solidarity with Nonhuman People by Timothy Morton
- What We Think About When We Think About Soccer by Simon Critchley
- Blackout by Sam Grenfall
- DI Mariner Series by Chris Collett:
  - Deadly Lies by Chris Collett
  - Innocent Lies by Chris Collett
  - Killer Lies by Chris Collett
- Half Life by Sarah Gray
- Dangerous Skies by Brian James
- Blood and Guts by Richard Hollingham
- Descent: My Epic Fall From Cycling by Thomas Dekker (cyclist)
- Beeronomics by Johan Swinnen and Devin Briski
- Key Performance Indicators by David Parmenter
- Billy Budd by Herman Melville
- All For Love Series by Karen Ranney
  - To Wed and Heiress by Karen Ranney
  - To Love a Duchess by Karen Ranney
  - To Bed the Bride Karen Ranney (awaiting publication)
- Trading With The Enemy by Hugo Meijer
- The Ultimate Colin Wilson by Colin Wilson
- To Fight Against This Age by Rob Riemen
- Strategy Builder by Stephen Cummings and Duncan Angwin
- Build It – The Rebel Playbook for World-Class Employee Engagement by Glenn Elliott and Debra Corey
- Eurotragedy by Ashoka Mody
- The Open Society and Its Enemies by Karl Popper
- This Searing Light, the Sun and Everything Else – Joy Division by Jon Savage
- A Short History of Financial Euphoria by John Kenneth Galbraith

== Awards and nominations ==
Award Body	Award	Title	Result
Audio Producer's Association	Best Audiobook Producer 2025	Bronze winner for Raconteurs Audio LLP	Won
BAFTA Children's Award	Learning Secondary	Walter Tull – Britain's First Black Officer	Nominated
Audie Award	Audie Award for Short Stories or Collections 2024	The Adventures of Finn MacCool & Other Irish Folk Tales	Nominated
AudioFile Magazine	Earphones Award	H.G. Wells Short Stories Volume 1	Won
One Voice Conference 2025	Best Factual Audiobook	Farts Aren't Invisible by Mick O'Hare	Won
One Voice Conference	Best Character Performance – Animation	Walter Tull – Britain's First Black Officer	Nominated
One Voice Conference	Best Radio Drama Performance	Pink Mist	Nominated
One Voice Conference	Best performance	Audiobook	Nominated
