= Strange Times =

Strange Times may refer to:

- Strange Times (The Chameleons album)
- Strange Times (Moody Blues album), and the title track
- Strange Times (The Black Keys song)
- Strange Times (Mohsen Namjoo song)
- Strange Times, a young adult novel and television franchise created by To the Stars
  - Strange Times: The Ghost in the Girl, a 2016 novel
