= Sekret Machines: Book 2 – A Fire Within =

Book by Tom DeLonge

- Author: Tom DeLonge; A. J. Hartley
- Language: English
- Published: September 18, 2018
- Publisher: To the Stars
- Pages: 688
- ISBN: 978-1943272341
- Preceded by: Sekret Machines: Book 1 – Chasing Shadows

Sekret Machines: Book 2 – A Fire Within is a science-fiction thriller novel based on actual events, created by Tom DeLonge, American musician, co-lead vocalist/guitarist of Blink-182 and Angels & Airwaves and British-American novelist A. J. Hartley. The first edition was released through DeLonge's To the Stars company on September 18, 2018. It's the second novel in the fictional Sekret Machines series following 2016's Sekret Machines: Book 1 – Chasing Shadows, and third book in the broader franchise following 2017's non-fiction novel Sekret Machines: Gods.

== Background ==
Whereas Chasing Shadows focused on hardware and machines, its sequel A Fire Within focuses on themes of "consciousness and the human mind". Co-author Hartley said, "Book One focused primarily on the machines themselves–hardware, if you like–but in the second installment of the series we push the story into the gray areas between the normal and the paranormal in more clearly human terms, exploring the idea that as technology might make exponential evolutionary progress, so might people themselves. The result continues the story of the first novel, picking up pretty much where it left off, but shifts the tonality of the narrative into new territory, new adventures and new sekrets."

To promote the book, To the Stars released a digital copy of the A Fire Within's first three chapters for download.

== Synopsis ==
A Fire Within continues the story of Jennifer, Timika, Alan and Barry from Chasing Shadows. After being chased by a powerful corporation, Barry and Alan explore "Dreamland" while Timika and Jennifer track down an ancient tablet.

As with the previous fiction novel in the series, Chasing Shadows, the story is a work of fiction loosely based on true stories obtained by DeLonge through top military and intelligence officials.

== Reception ==
A Fire Within was generally met with positive reviews from critics. Duke Brickhouse of ExoNews said, "It is not surprising that such an accomplished writer as A.J. Hartley, a USA Today and New York Times bestselling author of adventure books geared toward young adults, would create yet another highly regarded novel. What is surprising is the depth of information that the story conveys, which the world is only now on the brink of perceiving." In Bookwormex's review, the author wrote, "Ultimately, Sekret Machines Book 2: A Fire Within is a nice work of science-fiction, and while it might be cookie-cutter and even average in some segments, on the whole I found it to be an engaging and fast-paced story with the ability to push me to think for myself. If you have read the first book in the series and enjoyed it, I believe you will also be quite pleased with this second one... especially if you felt book one moved a bit too slowly."
