= Poet Anderson ...of Nightmares =

Book by Tom DeLonge and Suzanne Young

Poet Anderson ...Of Nightmares
- First edition
- Authors: Tom DeLonge & Suzanne Young
- Cover artist: Tom French
- Language: English
- Genre: Young adult fiction
- Publisher: To the Stars
- Publication date: 2015
- Publication place: United States
- Media type: Print Hardback
- Pages: 368
- ISBN: 194327200X
- Preceded by: Poet Anderson: The Dream Walker
- Followed by: Poet Anderson: ...In Darkness

Poet Anderson ...of Nightmares is Tom DeLonge's first novel, written in collaboration with New York Times bestselling author Suzanne Young. The novel was published in October 2015 by To the Stars. It is the first book of the upcoming Poet Anderson trilogy.

== Synopsis ==
Jonas Anderson and his older brother Alan are Lucid Dreamers. But after a car accident lands Alan in a coma, Jonas sets out into the Dream World in an attempt to find his brother and wake him up. What he discovers instead is an entire shared consciousness where fear comes to life as a snarling beast called a Night Terror, and a creature named REM is bent on destruction and misery, devouring the souls of the strongest dreamers. With the help of a Dream Walker—a guardian of the dreamscape, Jonas must face his fears, save his brother, and become who he was always meant to be: Poet Anderson.

== Characters ==
Jonas Anderson
The novel's protagonist, who is a lucid dreamer and who is trying to find his brother Alan in The Dream World to wake him up from a coma
Alan Anderson
Jonas's older brother, also a lucid dreamer
Samantha Birnam-Wood
Jonas's love interest and classmate
Alexander Birnam-Wood
Sam's dad. Owner of Eden Hotel
Jarabec
Poet's Dream Walker
Dream Walkers
Guardians of The Dream World.
REM
Main antagonist. Controls Night Stalkers.
Night Stalkers
Corrupted souls of those killed by REM.

== Reception ==
Consequence of Sound called the book "a blend between Harry Potter and The Matrix".

== Audiobook ==
In 2017 Tantor Media released ...of Nightmarres in audiobook format, narrated by Liam Gerrard. The title has received critical acclaim and achieved 4.5 star ratings out of 5 on Audible.

== Film Adaptation ==
To The Stars has partnered with RatPac to bring Poet Anderson to big screens. It is hoped the movie's budget might reach $100m.

DeLonge is also filming a short feature film with Tyler Posey and Dylan Sprayberry
