= Sekret Machines: Book 1 – Chasing Shadows =

Book by Tom DeLonge

- 2017 paperback cover
- Author: Tom DeLonge; A. J. Hartley
- Language: English
- Published: April 5, 2016
- Publisher: To the Stars
- Pages: 704
- ISBN: 9781943272297
- Followed by: Sekret Machines: Book 2 – A Fire Within

Sekret Machines: Book 1 – Chasing Shadows is a science-fiction thriller novel based on actual events created by Tom DeLonge, American guitarist of Blink-182 and Angels & Airwaves, and British-American novelist A. J. Hartley. The first edition was released on April 5, 2016 through DeLonge's To the Stars company. Chasing Shadows is the first book in the Sekret Machines series of both fiction and non-fiction books. The 2017 paperback second edition includes a new foreword written by Jim Semivan.

== Background ==
Guitarist Tom DeLonge of the punk band Blink-182 spent his youth fascinated by aliens and UFOs, reading books on various related subjects in his freetime and even wrote the song "Aliens Exist" featured on Blink-182's 1999 breakout album, Enema of the State. Among other reasons, DeLonge departed his band in 2015 to research UFOs, a move that had some music critics questioning his mental health and calling him "batshit insane". Following his departure, DeLonge connected with multiple "high-ranking military officials and scientific elites" for more than a year to learn about their stories and collaborate with them on a series of novels. He specifically sought out high-ranking officials to distance the project from other projects with lesser credibility, such as Disclosure Project. He was motivated to write the book series to highlight the possible threat to national and global security posed by alien visitors.

Co-author A. J. Hartley was also fascinated by UFOs in his youth, but remains skeptical about some of DeLonge's theories. Hartley admires DeLonge's objectivity in his research, saying, "[DeLonge] is a guy who is trying to put together what happened. He doesn't have this driving conviction that it's aliens. His idea shifts as he gets new information. It's not all about little green men."

== Synopsis ==
Chasing Shadows tells the intersecting stories of Timika, a skeptical UFO journalist; Jerzy, a WWII prisoner of war; Jennifer, an heiress; and Alan, a pilot involved with an Area 51 project.

The story of Chasing Shadows is partly "based on actual events" DeLonge claims to have obtained from military officials in the US government, combined with elements "from the imagination of" DeLonge. He elaborated: "After taking over a year to meet, prove myself and acquire eight elite advisors — each of whom has held the highest positions within the military, scientific and executive branch offices — this story contains true information from a secret historical record, some of which has never been heard until now."

== Reception ==
Sekret Machines: Book 1 – Chasing Shadows was generally met with positive criticism. Nicholas Pell of LA Weekly said, "Chasing Shadows is hefty but a page-turner, more comparable to a mystery or thriller than to science fiction." Billie Rae Bates of Foreword Reviews said, "Amid its twists and turns, fast-moving action, and converging stories, Chasing Shadows offers an enjoyable listen for conspiracy theorists and sci-fi fans. Ultimately, it's your choice whether or not to believe."

== Related media ==
=== Chasing Shadows EP ===
Tom DeLonge's alternative rock band Angels & Airwaves created a four-song EP titled Chasing Shadows that is meant to be an audio companion or soundtrack to Sekret Machines: Book 1 – Chasing Shadows. The EP's release coincided with the novel's release and peaked at number 109 on the Billboard 200 charts.

=== Sekret Machines series ===
Chasing Shadows is the first of a planned series of novels. The second book of a planned fictional trilogy titled Sekret Machines: Book 2 – A Fire Within was released in 2018 and also co-authored by Hartley. DeLonge is also working on a series of non-fiction Sekret Machines books with occult novelist Peter Levenda. The first book in that series titled Sekret Machines: Gods was released in 2017.

Sekret Machines, is being adapted for television by Legendary Entertainment and producer Dan Farah.

=== Documentary series ===
Along with the novel's release, DeLonge announced a planned Sekret Machines documentary television series.
