= Poet Anderson: ...In Darkness =

Book by Tom DeLonge and Suzanne Young

- Author: Tom DeLonge; Suzanne Young
- Language: English
- Genre: Young adult fiction
- Published: January 30, 2018
- Publisher: To the Stars; Simon & Schuster
- Pages: 304
- ISBN: 978-1943272327
- Preceded by: Poet Anderson ...of Nightmares

Poet Anderson: ...In Darkness is a young adult science fiction novel created by Tom DeLonge, American musician, former co-lead vocalist/guitarist of Blink-182, currently of Angels & Airwaves, and Suzanne Young, author of the Program series and Girls With series. The book was co-released through DeLonge's To the Stars company and Simon & Schuster on January 30, 2018. In Darkness is the second novel in DeLonge and Young's Poet Anderson series following the novel Poet Anderson ...of Nightmares (2015) in addition to the short film Poet Anderson: The Dream Walker (2014). It was released as an audiobook by Tantor Media in 2018, narrated by Liam Gerrard.

== Background ==
The story of In Darkness was inspired by a study conducted by Stanford University attempting to examine the ways that dreams can effect the real world. DeLonge and Young made a conscious effort to explore darker themes with In Darkness. DeLonge said, "Things get a bit darker for Poet in this book. His world has become more dangerous and unforgiving and he risks losing himself for the greater good. Suzanne and I had many conversations about the architecture behind Poet and his world and she made this story really special."

== Synopsis ==
Following the story of Of Nightmares, Jonas Anderson failed to save his comatose brother Alan. Jonas is tortured by his failure as Alan's health deteriorates as Night Stalkers take over the Dreamscape. In order to save reality from nightmares and his brother Alan, Jonas as his Dreamscape alternate persona Poet the Dream Walker must destroy the Dreamscape.

== Reception ==
The Guardian gave Of Nightmares a mixed-to-positive review, suggesting it was a good book but lacked depth. The author of the review wrote, "Overall, Poet Anderson... Of Nightmares was an enjoyable read. It was just another YA book with a stunningly creative world, let down only by poor characterisation and narrative. It takes a while to explain what is going on, and it also moved incredibly fast, both of which can be confusing."
