= A. J. Hartley =

American writer

Andrew James Hartley
- Hartley at Dragon Con in 2026
- Born: August 7, 1964 (age 62); Preston, England, United Kingdom
- Occupations: Novelist; dramaturge; professor
- Writing career
- Genres: Literature, fiction, thriller
- Website: ajhartley.net

Andrew James Hartley (born August 7, 1964) is a British-born American Shakespeare scholar and novelist.

== Works ==
Hartley's first books were a four book thriller sequence, The Mask of Atreus, On the Fifth Day, What Time Devours, and Tears of the Jaguar. The first three published by Penguin, and the last by Thomas and Mercer. All four have archaeological roots, and focus on museum director Deborah Miller and English teacher Thomas Knight.

He then published the fantasy adventures Act of Will and Will Power through Tor. The series has subsequently spawned short stories.

The first of three middle grades and young adult adventures, Darwen Arkwright and the Peregrine Pact, was released from Razorbill (Penguin) in October 2011. In 2011, he co-authored with David Hewson a novelization of Shakespeare's Macbeth written specially for audio and released by Audible.com in June, narrated by Alan Cumming. His second collaboration with Hewson – an audio novel based on Hamlet, performed by Richard Armitage – was named Audible.com's best book of 2014 and was nominated for two Audie awards.

Hartley is currently working with Tom DeLonge (of Angels and Airwaves and Blink-182) on a novel series – Sekret Machines – released by DeLonge's To The Stars company in 2016. The series will have three books and a documentary film. The first book in the series, Chasing Shadows, was accompanied by a four-track EP of the same name by Angels and Airwaves.

Hartley is also writing a new young adult science fiction series to be published by DeLonge's To The Stars Inc. and distributed by Simon and Schuster, called Cathedrals of Glass. The first book, Planet of Blood and Ice, was released in February 2017. A limited signed edition was released through To The Stars in November 2016 and sold out in 36 hours. With DeLonge's company partnered with Simon and Schuster, Hartley also wrote the stand-alone novel Trinity (2024) and he first of what may be a new sci-fi series Time Rider with Delonge in 2026.

June 2016 saw the release of the first of his new young adult series, SteepleJack, by Tor Teen. The book received several starred reviews from trade journals including Kirkus Reviews, Publishers Weekly and ALA Booklist. It was listed as one of Kirkus's Best Teen Books for 2016 and won both the Manly Wade Wellman and International Thriller Writers Awards. It was followed by Firebrand in 2017 and Guardian in 2018, and the TV rights were subsequently optioned for development as an animated series.

Hartley made his UK debut in March 2018 with the publication of Cold Bath Street, a YA ghost story/thriller set in his home town of Preston, Lancashire. The book's title comes from a real street that once housed a public baths for poor Prestonians to bathe in, and is reputed to be haunted. Published by UCLan Publishing, the book was edited, designed, project-managed and produced by students on UCLan's MA Publishing course, the only student-run, student-led publishing house in the world. The book was long-listed for the Carnegie Medal and performed for audio by Christopher Eccleston. The same publisher released Hartley's Darwen Arkwright series (renamed Monsters in the Mirror) in 2019. The sequel to Cold Bath Street was published in October 2019. Monsters in the Mirror, the UK edition of Darwen Arkwright and the Peregrine Pact, was published on 1 March 2019.

UCLan also published the UK edition of his YA fantasy adventure, Hideki Smith, Demon Queller, written with the assistance of his Japanese American wife and son, and published in the US by Falstaff books. The second in the series was released in 2025. A Japanese language edition of book 1 was also released and consecrated at a special Shinto ceremony at Nagata shrine, in Kobe in 2026, at which Hartley and his translator, Niwa Masayuki, were present.

His latest adult thrillers, authored under the pseudonym Andrew Hart, are Lies That Bind Us (2018) and The Woman in Our House (2019) from Lake Union Publishing.

Hartley drew on his life as a Shakespeare professor to write the time travel fantasy novel Burning Shakespeare which was published by Falstaff Books, who also published his Impervious a short YA novel which emerged from Hartley's experience of a school shooting on the campus of the university where he taught.

In addition to the novels based on Shakespeare written with David Hewson, several of Hartley's audiobooks are voiced by celebrity actors, including Noma Dumezweni (Steeplejack) and Christopher Eccleston (Cold Bath Street).

== Personal life ==
Hartley was born in Preston, Lancashire. After his undergraduate degree he lived in Japan where he taught English for two years, travelling extensively throughout Asia. He then moved to the United States and obtained Masters and Doctoral degrees in English Literature from Boston University. He taught for nine years at the University of West Georgia and became the resident dramaturg for Georgia Shakespeare. At present he is the Emeritus distinguished professor of Shakespeare in the Department of Theatre at the University of North Carolina at Charlotte where he taught for 18 years. He is a theatre director and dramaturg, and for 10 years was the editor of the performance journal Shakespeare Bulletin, published by Johns Hopkins University press. He was the director of the Shakespeare in Action Center at UNC Charlotte. His third novel, What Time Devours, draws on his experiences as an academic and centers on a lost Shakespeare play called Love's Labour's Won.

He studied Egyptology at Manchester University and worked just outside Jerusalem at a Bronze Age site. His mystery/thrillers, which have been USA Today and New York Times bestsellers, reflect this interest in the past, and particularly in the history of culture and ideas. Two of his principal characters are Deborah Miller, a Jewish museum curator who lives in Atlanta, and Thomas Knight, a high school English teacher from Evanston, Illinois. On April 30, 2019, he was on campus at UNC Charlotte when a gunman killed two students and wounded four others. Hartley took shelter with some students until the police declared the situation safe. He used this experience in his YA fantasy novel, Impervious, which was published the following year by Falstaff Books, a Charlotte publisher.

His YouTube channel includes videos on writing and walk-through analyses of songs by Japanese rock and pop bands, notably Babymetal and Atarashii Gakko!.

He is married to a Japanese-American medical doctor whom he met when living in Japan. They have one son.

== Awards and honors ==
- 2001–2002: University of West Georgia Honors Professor of the Year
- 2012: SIBA Book Award (young adult) for Darwen Arkwright and the Peregrine Pact
- 2016: named to Kirkus Best Teen Books of 2016 list for Steeplejack
- 2017: named on the American Library Association's list of best young adult books for 2017 for Steeplejack
- 2017: winner of the Manly Wade Wellman Award for science fiction and fantasy, North Carolina, for Steeplejack
- 2017: winner of the International Thriller Writers Award (young adult category), for Steeplejack
- 2018: nominated for the Dragon Award (young adult category) for Cold Bath Street
- 2018: long-listed for the Carnegie Medal for Cold Bath Street
- 2024: finalist for the Dragon Award for Hideki Smith, Demon Queller

== Bibliography ==
Academic books

- The Shakespearean Dramaturg: A Theoretical and Practical Guide, November 2005
- Shakespeare and Political Theatre in Practice, January 2014
- Shakespeare on the University Stage, December 2014
- Julius Caesar (Shakespeare in Performance), April 2014
- Julius Caesar: A Critical Reader, October 2016
- Shakespeare and Millennial Fiction, January 2018

Adult mystery/thriller

- The Mask Of Atreus, April 2006 (novel)
- On the Fifth Day, July 2007 (novel)
- What Time Devours, January 2009 (novel)
- Tears of the Jaguar, September 2012

Adult mystery/thriller - published under the pen name Andrew Hart

- Lies that Bind Us, June 2018, published by Lake Union Publishing
- The Woman in Our House, June 2019, published by Lake Union Publishing

Alternative detective

- Steeplejack, June 2016
- Firebrand, June 2017, part of the Steeplejack Saga
- Guardian, June 2018, part of the Steeplejack Saga

Essays and features

- How I Got Published, featured, September 2007
- How to Write Magical Words: A Writer's Companion (with David B. Coe, Faith Hunter, Stuart Jaffe, Misty Massey, C.E. Murphy), January 2011
- Thrillers: 100 Must-Reads, featured (page 11), January 2012

Historical fiction

- Macbeth, a Novel (with David Hewson) July 2010 as audiobook (narrated by Alan Cumming), spring 2011 print.'
- Hamlet, Prince of Denmark, a Novel (with David Hewson) May 2014 (narrated by Richard Armitage), fall 2014 print."
- Sekret Machines: Book 1 – Chasing Shadows (with Tom DeLonge), April 2016
- Sekret Machines: Book 2 – A Fire Within (with Tom DeLonge), September 2018
- Burning Shakespeare, April 2022, published by Falstaff Books
- Trinity (with Tom DeLonge), June 2024

Middle grades adventure

- Darwen Arkwright and the Peregrine Pact, October 2011, part of Arkwright Saga
- Darwen Arkwright and the Insidious Bleck, November 2012, part of Arkwright Saga
- Darwen Arkwright and the School of Shadows, August 2013, part of Arkwright Saga
- Monsters in the Mirror, UK edition of Darwen Arkwright and the Peregrine Pact, March 2019
- The Mirrors Shattered: Beyond the Mirror, UK edition of Darwen Arkwright and the Insidious Black, August 2020

Young adult fantasy

- Act of Will, March 2009 (novel), part of Hawthorne Saga
- Will Power, September 2010 (novel), part of Hawthorne Saga
- The Cerulean Stone: A Will Hawthorne short story, May 2013
- The Slave Trader's Wedding: A Will Hawthorne Short Story, June 2013
- Cathedrals of Glass: Planet of Blood and Ice, February 2017
- Cathedrals of Glass: Valkrys Wakes, January 2019
- Cold Bath Street, April 2018, published by UCLan Publishing
- Written Stone Lane, September 2019, published by UCLan Publishing
- Impervious, April 2020, published by Falstaff Books
- Hideki Smith, Demon Queller, September 2023, published by Falstaff Books
