= Monsters of California =

- Theatrical released poster
- Directed by: Tom DeLonge
- Written by: Tom DeLonge; Ian Miller
- Produced by: Tom DeLonge
- Starring: Richard Kind; Jack Samson
- Production companies: Cartel Pictures; Striker Entertainment; To The Stars Inc.
- Distributed by: Screen Media (United States)
- Release date: June 10, 2023
- Running time: 110 minutes
- Country: United States
- Language: English

Monsters of California is a 2023 science-fiction comedy-drama film written and directed by Tom DeLonge of Blink-182 and Angels & Airwaves in his featured-length directorial debut. The film is a long-standing passion project of DeLonge who has a history of interest in UFOs and conspiracy theories. Richard Kind, Casper Van Dien, and Camille Kostek all star.

== Plot ==
Teenager Dallas Edwards and his derelict friends go on a quest for the meaning behind a series of mysterious, paranormal events in Southern California.

== Cast ==
- Jack Samson as Dallas
- Jack Lancaster as Toe
- Jared Scott as Riley
- Gabrielle Haugh as Kelly
- Arianne Zucker as Leah
- Camille Kostek as Meg
- Casper Van Dien as Myers
- Richard Kind as Dr Walker
- Dane DiLiegro as Bigfoot

== Reception ==
The film received mixed reviews. Rotten Tomatoes gave it a score of 44% based on reviews from 9 critics. Jose Greenwood at MovieWeb criticized the film for the way it "whacks you over the head with the point it's trying to make."
