= To the Stars... Demos, Odds and Ends =

Studio album by Tom DeLonge
- Released: April 21, 2015
- Genre: Progressive rock; punk rock
- Length: 25:51
- Label: To the Stars
- Producer: Tom DeLonge; Aaron Rubin

Singles from To the Stars
- 1. "New World" Released: March 10, 2015; 2. "Circle-Jerk-Pit" Released: April 7, 2015

To the Stars... Demos, Odds and Ends (often shortened to To the Stars) is the debut studio album by Tom DeLonge. It was released on April 21, 2015, following his departure from Blink-182 in January 2015, through DeLonge's multimedia company also titled To the Stars. The album To the Stars is said to contain tracks from DeLonge's "personal stash", which include songs originally intended to be recorded with Blink-182, as well as tracks originally meant for Angels & Airwaves. The eight-song album was released on vinyl, CD and digital formats.

== Background ==
A few weeks after DeLonge announced his departure from the pop punk band Blink-182, through social media he expressed his interest in releasing demos he wrote for a potential Blink-182 album. The album To the Stars was formally announced on February 28, 2015, and DeLonge later elaborated that the album was one of four albums he would be releasing in 2015; he intended to release two solo albums and two Angels & Airwaves albums, but by the end of the year only the solo album and the Angels & Airwaves EP ...Of Nightmares had been released.

== Promotion ==
Leading up to the album's release, DeLonge released several songs for online streaming with accompanying music or lyric videos. He first released an online stream for the track "New World" on March 10, 2015. A lyric video for the track "The Invisible Parade" was released on March 24, and the song itself may have been inspired by DeLonge's brother who served in Iraq as a Naval lieutenant. On April 7, an online stream for the track "Circle-Jerk-Pit" was released, and a few weeks later a music video for the track was released on April 21.

The official music video for "New World" was released on April 2, 2015. It was directed by Mark Eaton and consists of time-lapsed scenes of DeLonge destroying various instruments, a laptop and sound equipment at his studio Jupiter Sound in San Diego, using a Squier Stratocaster guitar and a sledgehammer. These scenes are interspersed with others of DeLonge wandering the streets of San Diego, holding the same destroyed Squier Stratocaster held together with duct tape. NME described the video as being "symbolic" and Billboard said that it is "hard not to think of this as an eff you to his old band, as he packs up his stratocaster and hits the streets."

== Critical reception ==
Professional ratings
Aggregate scores
Source	Rating
Metacritic	49/100
Review scores
Source	Rating
AllMusic	3/5 stars
Consequence of Sound	D
Punknews.org	2/5 stars
Rolling Stone	2/5 stars

To the Stars received mixed reviews from music critics. At Metacritic, which assigns a rating determined by a "weighted average" of reviews from mainstream critics, the album received a score of 49, based on 4 reviews, indicating "mixed or average reviews".

Stephen Thomas Erlewine of AllMusic considered the album transitional, writing, "To the Stars does feel like a solo album but it also does feel a bit like a warehouse -- a way to clear the decks as he preps for the next great project." Brittany Spanos of Rolling Stone felt DeLonge unsuccessful in determining a "clear solo identity", opining, "if this "Suburban King" wants to rise again, he may need some help from his friends." Mike Damante of the Houston Chronicle was passive, commenting, "For the most part, these demos are enjoyable, but it would be sad if they never reached the proper means for their purpose and were recorded for the projects they were intended for in the first place." Kerrang! deemed it "a distinctly mixed bag".

== Track listing ==
1. "New World" – 3:34
2. "An Endless Summer" – 4:09
3. "Suburban Kings" – 4:10
4. "The Invisible Parade" – 3:29
5. "Circle-Jerk-Pit" – 1:59
6. "Landscapes" – 2:14
7. "Animals" – 3:41
8. "Golden Showers in the Golden State" – 2:35

== Personnel ==
Credits for To the Stars... Demos, Odds and Ends adapted from liner notes.

- Tom DeLonge – guitars, vocals, bass guitar, piano, synth strings, production
- Brooks Wackerman – drums
- Aaron Rubin – production, bass guitar on "An Endless Summer", recording engineer, mixing engineer
- Brian Gardner – mastering engineer
- Tom Lord-Alge – mixing engineer on "Suburban Kings"

== Charts ==
Chart performance for To the Stars... Demos, Odds and Ends
Chart (2015)	Peak position
UK Albums (OCC)	96
US Billboard 200	70
US Top Alternative Albums (Billboard)	9
US Independent Albums (Billboard)	6
US Top Rock Albums (Billboard)	11
