= Tom DeLonge =

American rock musician and songwriter (born 1975)

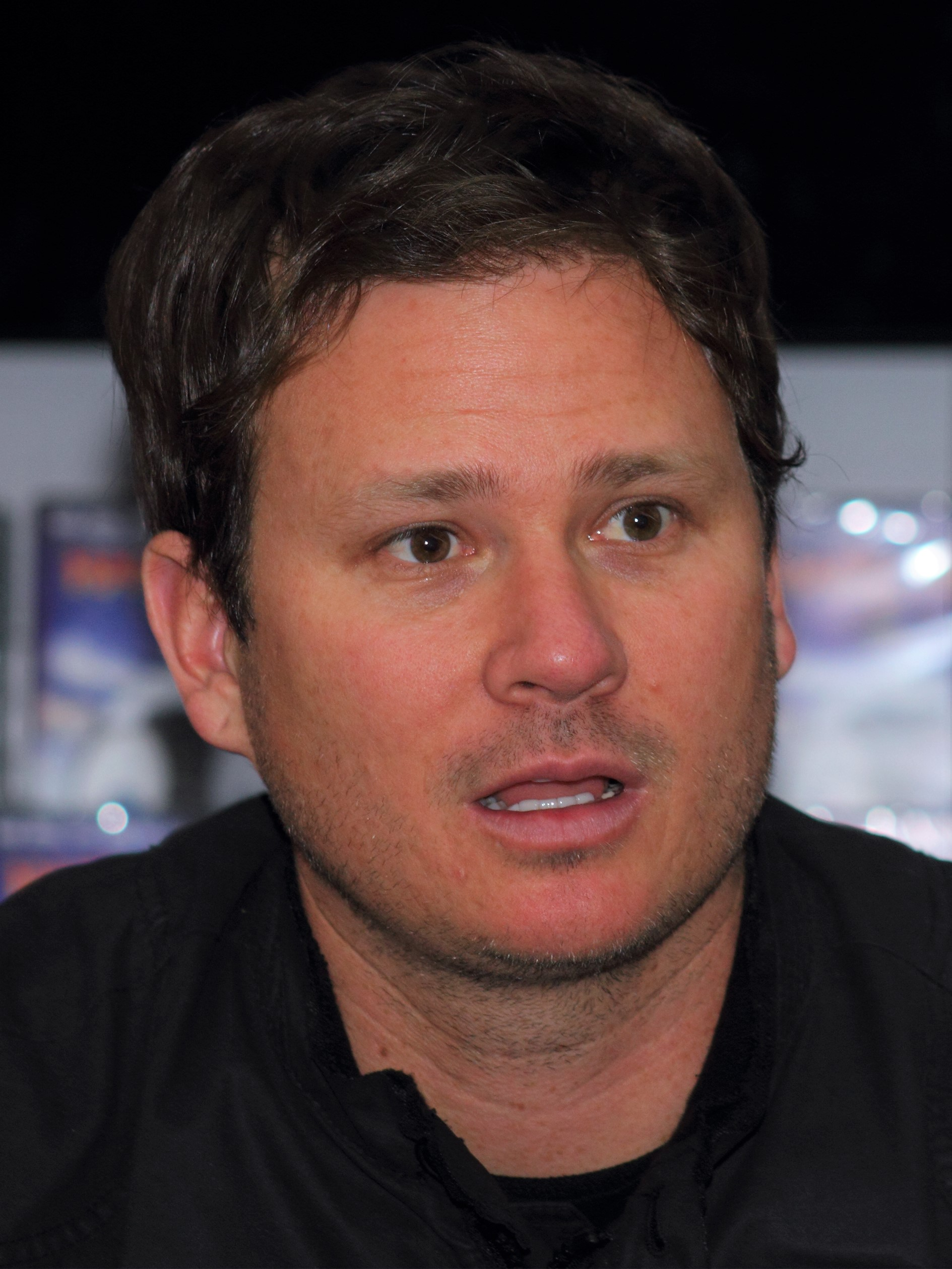
- DeLonge in 2012
- Born: Thomas Matthew DeLonge; December 13, 1975 (age 50); Poway, California, U.S.
- Occupations: Musician; singer; songwriter; author; filmmaker; actor; entrepreneur
- Years active: 1992–present
- Organization: To The Stars Inc.
- Spouses: Jennifer Jenkins (m. 2001; div. 2019) Rose-Marie Berryman (m. 2021)
- Children: 2
- Musical career
- Genres: Pop-punk; punk rock; skate punk; alternative rock; space rock
- Instruments: Vocals; guitar; keyboards; bass
- Member of: Blink-182; Angels & Airwaves
- Formerly of: Box Car Racer

Thomas Matthew DeLonge (/dəˈlɒŋ/; born December 13, 1975) is an American musician and songwriter best known as the co-founder, co-lead vocalist, and guitarist of the rock band Blink-182 across three stints (1992–2005, 2009–2015, and since 2022). He is also the lead vocalist and guitarist of the rock band Angels & Airwaves, which he formed in 2005 after his first departure from Blink-182. DeLonge is noted for his distinctive nasal singing voice.

DeLonge received his first guitar as a child and later began writing punk rock songs. While in high school, he formed Blink-182 with bassist Mark Hoppus and drummer Scott Raynor. They signed with Cargo Music and released their debut album, Cheshire Cat (1995), which made them popular in the local scene. Their second album, Dude Ranch (1997), was released by MCA Records and featured the hit single "Dammit". Travis Barker replaced Raynor in 1998 and the group achieved widespread success with their third album, Enema of the State (1999), which featured three hit singles; it sold more than 15 million copies worldwide and went quadruple-platinum in the U.S. The band's fourth release, Take Off Your Pants and Jacket (2001), gave them their first No. 1 album.

DeLonge and Barker experimented with post-hardcore music on the album Box Car Racer (2002), which they released under the name Box Car Racer, but the side project was dissolved the next year. Blink-182's untitled fifth album, also known eponymously as Blink-182 (2003), reflected a change in tone. Following internal tension spearheaded by DeLonge, the band broke up in 2005 before reuniting in 2009. During their initial breakup, DeLonge formed Angels & Airwaves, which has released five albums and evolved into what he calls an "art project" encompassing various forms of media. In 2015, DeLonge once again departed from Blink-182 before returning a second time in 2022.

Outside of music, DeLonge has founded companies such as Macbeth Footwear, which sells vegan and organic clothing; Modlife, which sells technology designed to help artists monetize their creations; and To The Stars, which is dedicated to the exploration of fringe science. He scored and produced the sci-fi film Love (2011), has multiple film projects in development, and wrote the children's book The Lonely Astronaut on Christmas Eve (2013).

== Early life ==
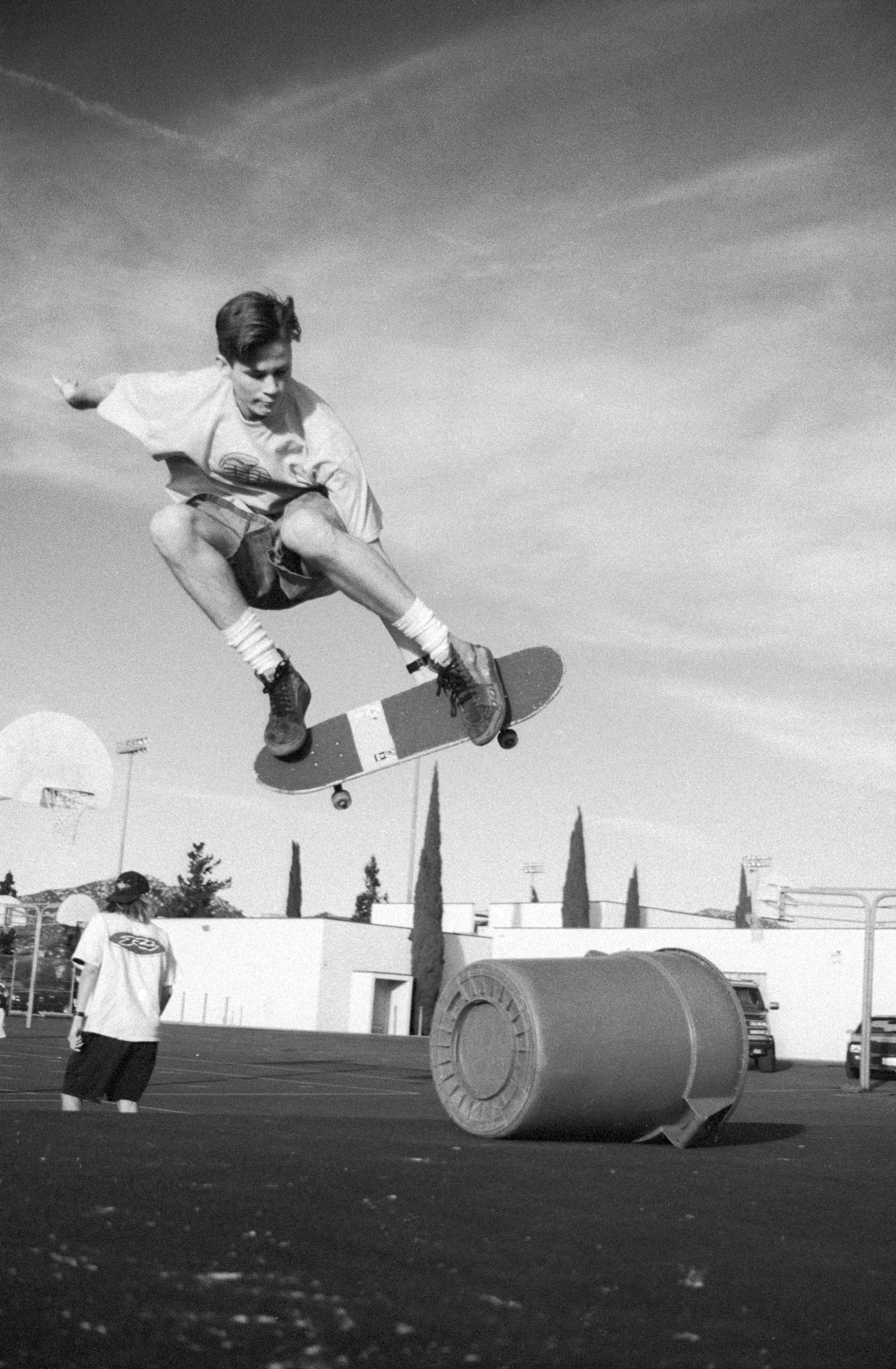
DeLonge skateboarding at Poway High School in the 1990s

Thomas Matthew DeLonge was born in Poway, California, on December 13, 1975, the son of mortgage broker, Constance (née Lovell), and oil company executive Thomas Lyon DeLonge. He has a brother, Shon, and a sister, Kari. He is of German and Mexican descent. His first musical instrument was a trumpet, which he received as a Christmas gift at age 11. He originally planned to become a firefighter, and participated in the San Diego Cadet Program. He first picked up the guitar from a friend at church camp, and became preoccupied by the instrument. Two friends in the sixth grade gave him his first guitar as a Christmas present, which he called a "beat-up, shitty acoustic guitar that was worth about $30".

In seventh grade, DeLonge visited a friend in Oregon who introduced him to the music of Stiff Little Fingers, the Descendents, and Dinosaur Jr. He consequently dyed his hair purple and began practicing the guitar in his bedroom. His first concert was the band Chemical People. He attempted to form a band named Big Oily Men, which was essentially a one-man band because its lineup consisted of whomever he could persuade to join him for short periods. He first began skateboarding in the third grade, and it consumed much of his time outside of school: "I lived, ate, and breathed skateboarding. All I did all day long was skateboard. It was all I cared about." He and friends would begin at one side of San Diego and attempt to skateboard to the other, pranking people in the process. DeLonge was an average student, later saying: "I knew exactly how hard I had to work in school. As long as I got that C, I wouldn't try one minute extra to get a B. I just cared about skateboarding and music."

DeLonge's parents fought constantly during his formative years, culminating in a divorce when he was 18. Shortly thereafter, his mother lost her job. He promptly moved out, feeling that he needed to start his own life; his brother was also away at that time in the Army, and his departure affected his family: "My mom and sister were left asking, 'What happened to our family?'" After high school, he worked on construction sites, driving a diesel truck and handling concrete and piping: "I hated, hated, hated my job. You know those people who hate their job? That was me." He quit when Blink-182 signed with MCA Records in 1996.

== Music career ==
=== 1992–2002: Blink-182 ===
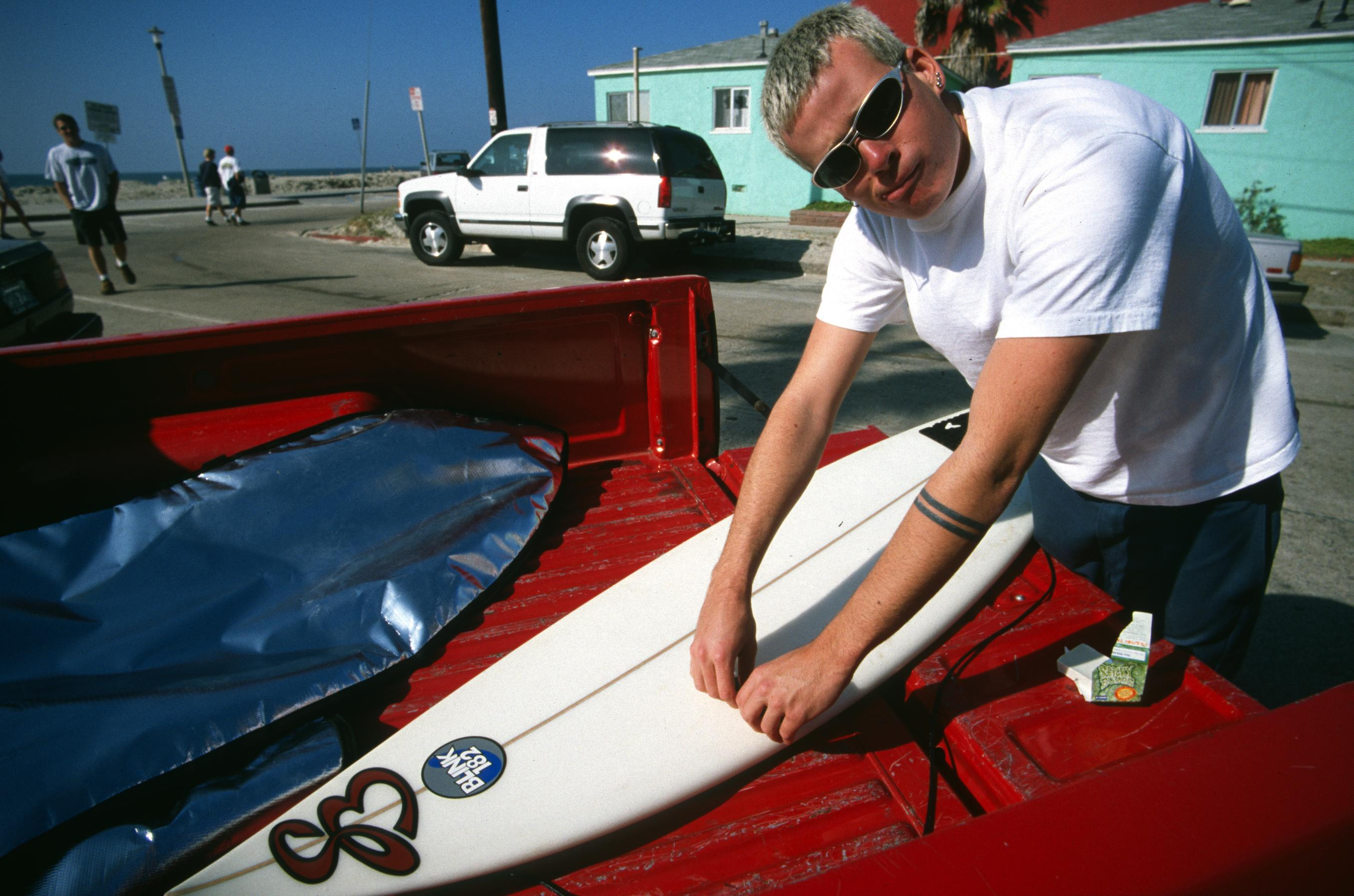
DeLonge with a surfboard in the mid-1990s. The band rose from the southern California skate/surf scene.

DeLonge formed his first successful band, Blink-182, in 1992. He was removed from Poway High School in the second half of his junior year for going to a basketball game while inebriated. He was forced to attend a different school for one semester, nearby Rancho Bernardo High School, where he became friends with Kerry Key, and his girlfriend, Anne Hoppus. Rancho Bernardo organized Battle of the Bands competitions, and DeLonge signed up, performing an original song titled "Who's Gonna Shave Your Back Tonight?" to a packed auditorium. Drummer Scott Raynor was at the competition with his own group, which soon dissolved, after which he was introduced by friend Paul Scott to DeLonge at a party. The two began to organize jam sessions at Raynor's home, shifting through various bassists. The following summer, his desire to be in a legitimate band increased significantly – Anne Hoppus characterized Delonge's passion as "incessant whining and complaining". Her brother, bassist, Mark Hoppus, was new to San Diego and she introduced the two one night that August. The two would jam for hours in DeLonge's garage, exchanging lyrics and writing new songs.

The trio began to practice together in Raynor's bedroom, spending hours together writing music, attending punk shows and movies and playing practical jokes. Hoppus and DeLonge would alternate singing vocal parts. The trio first operated under a variety of names, including Duck Tape and Figure 8, until DeLonge rechristened the band "Blink". Their first demo, Flyswatter—a combination of original songs and punk covers—was recorded in Raynor's bedroom in May 1993. DeLonge called clubs constantly in San Diego asking for a spot to play, as well as calling up local high schools convincing them that Blink was a "motivational band with a strong anti-drug message" in hopes to play at an assembly or lunch. With help from local record store manager Pat Secor, the group recorded Buddha (1994), a demo cassette that increased the band's stature within San Diego. Cargo Records signed the band on a "trial basis"; Hoppus was the only member to sign the contract, as DeLonge was at work at the time and Raynor was still a minor. The band recorded their debut album in three days at Westbeach Recorders in Los Angeles, fueled by both new songs and re-recordings of songs from previous demos.

Although Cheshire Cat, released in February 1995, made very little impact commercially, it is cited by musicians as an iconic release.

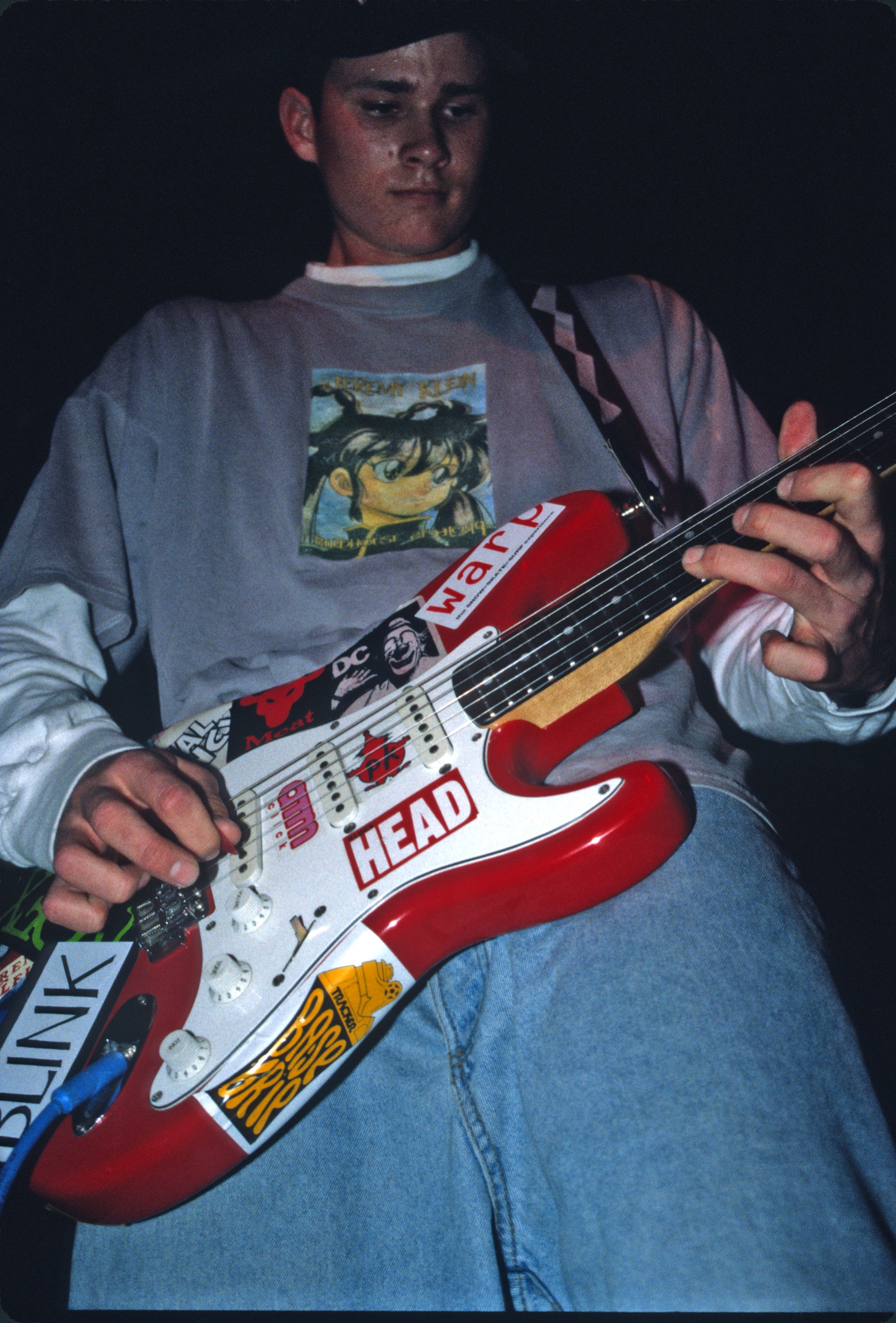
DeLonge performing at an early Blink-182 show

The band toured constantly between 1995 and 1996, performing nationwide, as well as in Canada and in Australia. By March 1996, the trio began to accumulate a genuine buzz among major labels, resulting in a bidding war between Interscope, MCA and Epitaph. MCA promised the group complete artistic freedom and eventually signed the band, but Raynor held a great affinity for Epitaph and began to feel half-invested in the band when they passed over the label. Their second effort, Dude Ranch, hit stores the following summer and the band headed out on their first Warped Tour. When lead single "Dammit" began rotation at Los Angeles-based KROQ-FM, other stations took notice and the single was added to rock radio playlists across the country. Dude Ranch shipped gold by 1998, but the exhaustive touring schedule brought tensions among the trio. Raynor had been drinking heavily to offset personal issues, and he was fired by DeLonge and Hoppus in mid-1998 despite agreeing to attend rehab and quit drinking.

Travis Barker, drummer for tourmate the Aquabats, filled in for Raynor, learning the 20-song setlist in 45 minutes before the first show. Barker joined the band full-time in summer 1998 and the band entered the studio with producer Jerry Finn later that year to begin work on their third album.

With the release of Enema of the State in June 1999, Blink-182 was catapulted to stardom. Three singles were released from the record—"What's My Age Again?", "All the Small Things", and "Adam's Song"—that became hit singles and MTV staples. "All the Small Things" became a number-one hit on the Modern Rock Tracks chart, but also became a crossover hit and peaked at number 6 on the Billboard Hot 100 chart. Although the band were criticized as synthesized, manufactured pop only remotely resembling punk and pigeonholed as a joke act due to the puerile slant of its singles and associating music videos, Enema of the State was an enormous commercial success. The album has sold over 15 million copies worldwide and had a considerable effect on pop punk music, inspiring a "second wave" of the genre and numerous acolytes.

After multi-platinum success, arena tours and cameo appearances (American Pie), the band recorded Take Off Your Pants and Jacket (2001), which debuted at number 1 in the United States, Canada, and Germany. Hit singles "The Rock Show", "Stay Together for the Kids" and "First Date" continued the band's mainstream success worldwide, with MTV cementing their image as video stars.

=== 2002: Box Car Racer ===
During time off from touring from Blink-182 in 2002, DeLonge felt an "itch to do something where he didn't feel locked in to what Blink was", and channeled his chronic back pain (a herniated disc) and resulting frustration into Box Car Racer (2002), a post-hardcore album that further explores his Fugazi and Refused inspiration. Refraining from paying for a studio drummer, he invited Barker to record drums on the project and Hoppus felt betrayed. The event caused great division within the trio for some time and an unresolved tension at the forefront of the band's later hiatus.

=== 2003–2005: Continued success with Blink-182 and departure ===
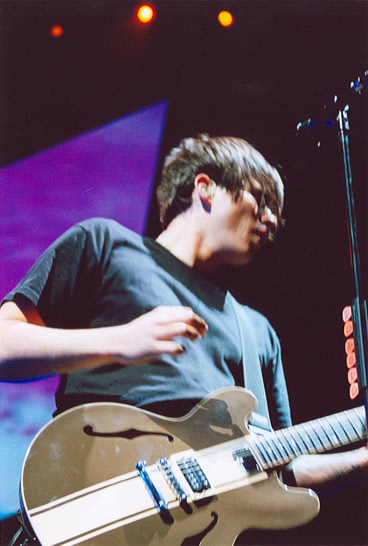
DeLonge performing in 2004 with Blink-182. The group dissolved the next year following internal tension, but reformed in 2009.

Blink-182 regrouped in 2003 to record their fifth studio album, infusing experimentalist elements into their usual pop punk sound, inspired by lifestyle changes (the band members all became fathers before the album was released) and side projects. Blink's eponymous fifth studio album was released in the fall of 2003 through Geffen Records, which absorbed sister label MCA earlier that year. Critics generally complimented the new, more "mature" direction taken for the release and lead singles "Feeling This" and "I Miss You" charted high, with the latter becoming the group's second number one hit on the Billboard Modern Rock Tracks chart. Fans were split by the new direction, and tensions within the band—stemming from the grueling schedule and DeLonge's desire to spend more time with his family—started to become evident.

DeLonge became uncomfortable with the hefty touring schedule, during which he was unable to see his growing family. He eventually expressed his desire to take a half-year respite from touring in order to spend more time with family. Hoppus and Barker protested his decision, which they felt was an overly long break. DeLonge did not blame his bandmates for being disappointed with his requests, but was dismayed that they seemingly did not understand. In addition, he protested the idea of Barker's reality television series, Meet the Barkers, which was being produced for a 2005 premiere. DeLonge disliked television cameras everywhere, feeling his personal privacy was invaded.

Following the 2004 Indian Ocean earthquake and tsunami, DeLonge agreed to perform at Music for Relief's Concert for South Asia, a benefit show to aid victims. Further arguments ensued during rehearsals, rooted in the band member's increasing paranoia and bitterness toward one another. He considered his bandmates priorities "mad, mad different", and the breakdown in communication led to heated exchanges, resulting in his exit from the group.

=== 2005–2008: Angels & Airwaves ===
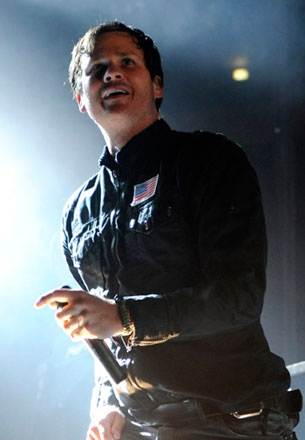
DeLonge on tour with Angels & Airwaves in 2008

In the wake of Blink-182's break-up, DeLonge underwent a complete reassessment of his prime concerns—a move "bearing the hallmarks of a nervous breakdown"—and went on a three-week "spiritual journey" in complete isolation away from his family, contemplating his life, career, and future in music. DeLonge felt psychologically hurt by the band's dissolution, likening it to a divorce and calling it a "traumatic experience" and a "disaster". He had been known for his role in the Blink-182 as "the low-brow prankster" and wanted to restart his career without worrying whether fans would find him funny.

DeLonge's endorsement of John Kerry in the 2004 presidential election led to him travelling the political circuit with the Democratic Party candidate; DeLonge was inspired by Kerry's call for widespread reform and likened his presidential campaign to a drug, remarking later that it "really changed [me]". He rediscovered the epiphany he'd developed during his tour with Kerry and applied it to the philosophy of his new group, Angels & Airwaves, while he redefined himself as he learned to play piano and self-produce and formed his own home studio.

The Adventure
Sample of "The Adventure"

In September 2005, after spending months avoiding publicity, DeLonge announced his new Angels & Airwaves project and promised "the greatest rock and roll revolution for this generation". His statements—containing predictions that the album would usher in an "entire new culture of the youth" and lead to the band's dominance—were regarded as highly grandiose in the press and mocked. Thoroughly engrossed by the process of developing the band, DeLonge often discussed plans for upcoming music, accompanying films, and other ancillary projects at great length and in exhaustive detail, culminating in an "intervention" staged by his managers, who were concerned about his frame of mind. His ambitious beliefs were intensified by his addiction to Vicodin, a drug which he used due to his back problem and did not try out again when he was unable to obtain it for a week, hallucinating and deep in withdrawal. We Don't Need to Whisper, the band's debut studio album, was released in 2006, and their second, I-Empire, followed in 2007.

=== 2008–2015: Blink-182 reunion and further Angels & Airwaves releases ===
DeLonge would reunite with Blink-182 near the end of 2008. At this time, Barker had recently survived a private plane crash, in which four others were killed. DeLonge's realization of Barker's near death incident was the catalyst for DeLonge desire to be included in the band's reformation. DeLonge found out via the TV news at an airport while waiting to board a flight; within minutes, he was crying in his seat. "I thought he was going to die", says DeLonge, who quickly reached out to his former bandmate, mailing him a letter and photograph. "Instantly after the plane crash, I was like, 'Hey, I want to play music with him again'". DeLonge was the first to approach the subject of reuniting, and Blink-182 announced their reunion, a new album, and a reunion tour in February 2009 at the 51st Annual Grammy Awards. Blink-182 embarked on a reunion tour of North America from July to October 2009, supported by Weezer and Fall Out Boy. The tour was successful, selling out amphitheaters nationwide: "I was completely blown away and dumbfounded by how big that reunion tour was. [...] We were very fortunate, very blessed", DeLonge later said. "And truthfully, that's why we continued, because we were so blown away. We were like, "Wow, we got to suck this up and start acting like adults because this is beautiful'".

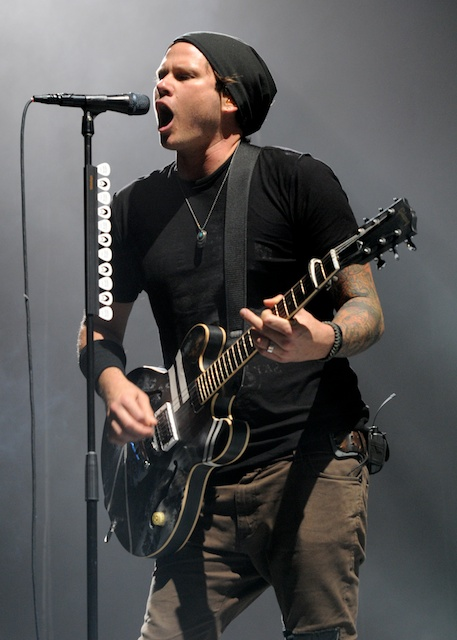
DeLonge performing at the 2011 Honda Civic Tour in Montreal

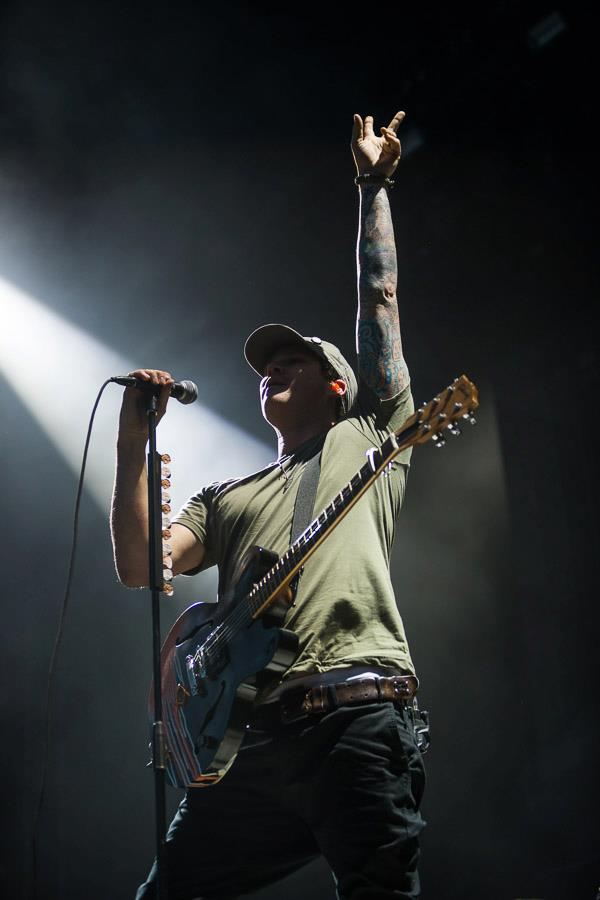
DeLonge performing with Blink-182 in 2013

The recording process for Neighborhoods, the band's sixth studio album, was stalled by their studio autonomy, tours, managers, and personal projects. The band members produced the record themselves following the death of Jerry Finn, their former producer that also served as an invaluable member of the band. DeLonge recorded at his studio in San Diego while Hoppus and Barker recorded in Los Angeles. Completion was delayed several times, which Hoppus attributed to the band learning to work by themselves without Finn, and both DeLonge and Hoppus expressed frustration during the sessions at the band's cabal of publicists, managers and attorneys (which DeLonge described as "the absolute diarrhea of bureaucracy"). DeLonge later expressed dissatisfaction at the method of recording for Neighborhoods, conceding that it led to a "loss of unity" within the band. The album was released in September 2011 and peaked at number two on the Billboard 200, but undersold expectations. Blink-182 left Interscope Records in October 2012, becoming an independent act. The band subsequently released Dogs Eating Dogs, an EP, in December 2012.

Delonge continued to release music and tour with Angels & Airwaves during his second tenure with Blink-182. During this period, the band would release three albums: Love (2010), Love: Part Two (2011) and The Dream Walker (2014).

Blink-182 planned to enter the studio to write and record their seventh studio album in January 2015, due for release later that year, but after delays attributed to DeLonge, the band issued a statement announcing his departure. In a press release, Hoppus and Barker said, "We were all set to play this festival and record a new album and Tom kept putting it off without reason. A week before we were scheduled to go in to the studio we got an email from his manager explaining that he didn't want to participate in any Blink-182 projects indefinitely, but would rather work on his other non-musical endeavors." In DeLonge's public response to Hoppus and Barker's claims about him not wanting to participate in a new Blink-182 album, he said the "60-page Blink contract" he was handed required that a new album be recorded within six months, and also included language that temporarily prohibited the release of other various projects that he was already under contract for. He stated, "All of these other projects are being worked, exist in contract form — I can't just slam the brakes and drop years of development, partnerships and commitments at the snap of a finger. I told my manager that I will do Blink-182 as long as it was fun and worked with the other commitments in my life, including my family."

=== 2015–2021: Solo album and continued Angels & Airwaves involvement ===
In March 2015, DeLonge shed some light on what his other projects entailed, claiming that he was working with "best selling authors" to co-write 15 novels with accompanying soundtrack EPs. He also expected to release four albums in 2015—two Angels & Airwaves albums and two solo albums—three of which would include a companion novel.

On April 21, 2015, DeLonge released his first solo album—an eight-song collection of Blink-182 demos and more, titled To the Stars... Demos, Odds and Ends. Angels & Airwaves would release two additional EPs within a year, ...Of Nightmares (2015) and Chasing Shadows (2016), both of which were companion pieces to books written by DeLonge. They would go on their first tour in seven years in 2019, and release a new album two years later with Lifeforms (2021).

=== 2022–present: Return to Blink-182 ===
On October 11, 2022, Blink-182 confirmed DeLonge's official return to the group after an eight-year hiatus, and announced that there would be an album with him in the near future. This announcement was followed three days later by the release of the single "Edging". The resulting album One More Time... was released on October 20, 2023.

== Artistry ==
=== Musical style ===
DeLonge's distinctive nasal singing style and accent has been widely observed, celebrated, and mocked. Julia Gray, a writer for Vulture, termed it "the Tom DeLonge Twang, [which] contorted words like things ("theeeengs") and my head ("myy'eaad") into a cartoonish California diction." DeLonge's singing style on "I Miss You"–particularly his verse lyrics "Where are you / and I'm so sorry", or pronunciation of the word head—has been widely referenced throughout popular culture, and is considered a meme. DeLonge stated he developed the style in an attempt to sound like Milo Aukerman of the Descendents. "It’s really hard to make [singing] sound good when you’re not even doing it right to begin with, you know?" he joked in 2019.

The style was studied by Stanford University's linguistics professor Penelope Eckert in an article for Atlas Obscura. Eckert determined DeLonge's pronunciations are a result of the California Shift, a regional chain shift that joins vowels and emphasizes words ending in "R". In the same article, Christopher Appelgren, former president of Golden State-based Lookout! Records, suggested the nasal style emerged as an amateur way to cut through the loudness of being in a punk band. David Anthony, writer for The A.V. Club, observes it could stem from a long line of punk singers affecting an accent: "Whether it be Johnny Rotten's snarl or Joe Strummer's overt Britishness, these kinds of exaggerated singing styles have been present from the genre’s birth."

Some writers have suggested DeLonge has consciously moved away from the nasal style throughout his career, particularly in the 2010s. Gray of Vulture observed that his "patented wail [became] newly deep and warbly," while Patrick Doyle from Rolling Stone called it "way different." In response, DeLonge agreed and said the change came upon starting Angels & Airwaves: "The tempo was slower, the melodies were written differently. And then, rather than nasally staccato, it became more like [a] violin, more like a stringed instrument. The notes flow together. And then it came naturally to me. [...] It’s the only way I know how to sing now."

DeLonge's guitar playing style developed as the result of being the only guitarist in the band, and as an attempt to sound like two guitars when played together with Hoppus' bass playing. His playing frequently employs arpeggiation. He self-described his guitar parts on early blink-182 releases as "riffs that were half riff/half chords or something just to try and fill in the space."

=== Equipment ===
==== Guitars ====
In the early years of Blink-182, DeLonge used a Squier Stratocaster on the band's demos and debut album Cheshire Cat. In late 1994, he acquired a white 40th Anniversary Edition Fender Stratocaster, which has come to be known by fans as the "Sticker Strat". It featured a DiMarzio X2N (and later a Seymour Duncan Invader) pickup in the bridge position on an angle, a Seymour Duncan JB Jr. in the middle (and later Seymour Duncan Lil' Screamin Demon), and a Seymour Duncan Hot Rails pickup in the neck position. He used this guitar on all of the touring in support of Cheshire Cat, as well as the recording and touring of Dude Ranch in 1997 before retiring it that fall. He still owns the guitar today. During the touring of Dude Ranch in 1998, he began to use Gibson Les Pauls with a Seymour Duncan Invader at the bridge. He used the Les Pauls on select tracks of Enema of the State before retiring them in 1999.

Beginning with the Enema of the State tour, he used Fender Custom Shop Stratocasters with Seymour Duncan Invader pickups. This eventually developed into his signature model, released by Fender in 2001. In 2023, Fender reissued the signature model in a limited edition run.

In 2001, during the recording and touring of the eponymous album by DeLonge's side project Box Car Racer, he began using a Gibson ES-335. He removed all electronics from the guitar except for the bridge volume control and replaced the stock bridge pickup with a Seymour Duncan Invader. This eventually lead to the creation of the Gibson Tom DeLonge Signature ES-333, which was released in 2003. This model consisted of a single Gibson Dirty Fingers pickup in the bridge position with one volume control. It was available between 2003 and 2009. A lower-priced model manufactured by Epiphone was released until 2019.

In December 2022, DeLonge revealed that he began using Fender Starcasters, moving away from his endorsement deal with Gibson and coinciding with his return to Blink-182. Like previous signature models, this guitar consists of a single humbucker in the bridge position (namely a Seymour Duncan SH-5 Custom pickup) and one volume knob. A signature model was subsequently released by Fender in 2024 in several colors: Surf Green, Olympic White, Shell Pink, and Shoreline Gold.

DeLonge endorses Ernie Ball strings and has used their Skinny Top Heavy Bottom strings on his electric guitars and Earthwood Phosphor Bronze Medium Light strings on his acoustic guitars.

==== Amps and pedals ====
The Mesa/Boogie Triple Rectifier was key to DeLonge's early sound; he employed them to create a distorted sound. "A Mesa/Boogie is like a nuke: you plug it in and it fills up every piece of the sonic spectrum," he said. As his sound gradually grew cleaner, he grew away from the Mesa/Boogies. DeLonge employed the Marshall JCM900 amps for his work on Dude Ranch, in which he improved his guitar tone. In a September 1999 Guitar Player article, DeLonge outlined his intentions: "I'm the kind of guitarist that wants the biggest, fattest, loudest, sound he can get."

When Blink-182 initially broke up in 2005, DeLonge altered his equipment setup for his work in Angels & Airwaves, pairing Vox AC30H2s and Fender '65 Twin Reverbs, and using less distortion. He carried this setup over into Blink-182 when he first returned in 2009.

Beginning with his work on Take Off Your Pants and Jacket (2001), he began to approach different chorus pedals, flangers and delays. Musically, he experimented with heavier guitar riffs on Box Car Racer (2002), while making greater use of pedals and loops.

=== Inspirations ===
DeLonge grew to prominence playing pop punk music. Southern California had a large punk population in the early 1990s, aided by an avid surfing, skating, and snowboarding scene. In contrast to East Coast punk music, the West Coast wave of groups, Blink included, typically introduced more melodic aspects to their music. "New York is gloomy, dark, and cold. It makes different music. The Californian middle-class suburbs have nothing to be that bummed about," said DeLonge.

In a 2011 article, he outlined six musical acts that impacted his growth as a musician, among them Stiff Little Fingers, U2, Depeche Mode, New Order, Fugazi, and the Descendents. The last was his main influence when he began playing guitar; early recordings such as Buddha were an attempt to emulate their sound, where he developed a rapid guitar stumming technique. He said about the Descendents: "Their records are [...] so fast and so riffy. I’d play along to that stuff and try to get better." Following the Descendents, DeLonge once cited Screeching Weasel as the second biggest influence on his songwriting in his early career.

DeLonge has shifted from punk rock in recent years, moving toward an effects-laden progressive-inspired sound. He has stated the first album he "ever fell in love with" was The Joshua Tree by U2, after which he delved into punk rock. He would later return to the album in his adult life, calling it his favorite album, describing it as "still relevant and soulful."

=== Influence ===
Panic! at the Disco's Brendon Urie and Ryan Ross both cited DeLonge as one of their major influences. Urie said that DeLonge influenced his singing, remarking that "He has a voice that no-one else has [...] He's one of my bigger influences. He always writes amazing melodies and songs." Ross said: "I wanted to learn how to play [the guitar] like Tom DeLonge."

== Non-musical endeavors ==
=== Business ===
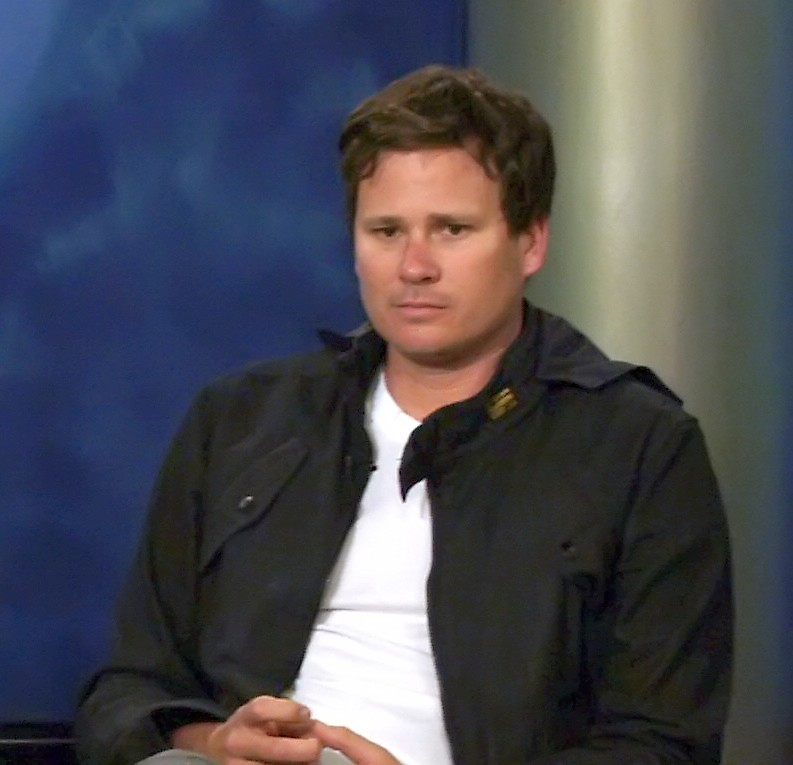
DeLonge in 2008

DeLonge was unsure if the band's status in the music industry would grow or last, and he expanded into business beginning in 1998. He started a holding group, Really Likable People (RLP), with a US$20,000 investment. Following this, he co-founded Loserkids.com, a website specializing in youth-branded apparel.

In 2001, DeLonge and Hoppus, together with childhood friend Dylan Anderson, established the clothing brand, Atticus Clothing. The following year, DeLonge founded Macbeth Footwear, a rock and roll-inspired shoe company.

The technology and design firm Modlife was founded by DeLonge in 2007, around the time that Blink-182 decided to part ways. DeLonge explained in 2014 that he was pondering a "plan B", whereby musical acts could monetize other aspects of their creative portfolio—posters, books, VIP tickets, limited-edition releases—given the challenges of contracts offered by major music companies and the emergence of file-sharing. Modlife handles the official websites and fan clubs for a range of artists, including the White Stripes, Pearl Jam, and Kanye West.

In 2011, DeLonge launched Strange Times, a website devoted to extraterrestrial life, paranormal activity, cryptozoology, and conspiracy theories. All of DeLonge's business entities exist under the RLP moniker, with the exception of Atticus Clothing, which was sold in 2005.

=== Film ===
DeLonge approached filmmaking when he directed the music video for the song "This Photograph is Proof (I Know You Know)" by Taking Back Sunday in 2004. He was fascinated by the medium, calling the process "so artistically satisfying", and he has since worked in film on Angels & Airwaves-related projects. In 2014, he co-directed the animated short film Poet Anderson: The Dream Walker.

In June 2012, DeLonge was working on two films: a feature-length Poet film and a film based on Strange Times. His directorial debut, Monsters of California, starring Richard Kind, was released in 2023.

=== Writing ===
In December 2013, DeLonge released a children's book, The Lonely Astronaut on Christmas Eve. The plot of the book is described by Alternative Press as a "rocketeer spending a cold Christmas alone on the moon who is visited by extraterrestrial life". DeLonge participated in a charity auction benefiting Rady Children's Hospital Foundation allowing fans to bid on a package including the book.

In March 2015, he announced he was co-writing 15 novels with "best selling authors" that would be released with soundtrack EPs. The Magnetic Press published his first comic book series in April 2015. The three issue comic book series titled Poet Anderson: The Dream Walker was based on his award-winning short film with the same name. In October 2015, he released the novel Poet Anderson ...of Nightmares written by him and author Suzanne Young, which was accompanied by an Angels & Airwaves EP. The audiobook version of Poet Anderson: ...Of Nightmares was recorded by Liam Gerrard and released by Tantor in October 2017. The sequel Poet Anderson: Of Nightmares was released in January 2018. The audiobook version of the sequel Poet Anderson: ...In Darkness was recorded by Liam Gerrard and released by Tantor in January 2018.

Sekret Machines: Book 1 – Chasing Shadows was released in April 2016. The release was a collaboration between DeLonge and author A. J. Hartley. In October 2016, DeLonge released his third novel, Strange Times: The Ghost in the Girl. This time DeLonge will collaborate with author Geoff Herbach and the novel will be based around the same characters from the graphic novel, Strange Times: The Curse of Superstition Mountain, that DeLonge published and authored in 2015.

On January 28, 2019, To The Stars released an animated narrative (by DeLonge) of his children's book, Who Here Knows Who Took My Clothes?

=== Conspiracy theories and aliens ===
DeLonge has been a believer in aliens, UFOs, and conspiracy theories since his youth, well before founding Blink-182. Band member Travis Barker said in a 2019 interview with Joe Rogan that DeLonge is incredibly passionate about them and would look for UFOs outside the tour bus window and even create search parties to find Bigfoot.

In 2014, DeLonge shared an article on Twitter which purported that the Smithsonian Institution had admitted to destroying thousands of skeletons belonging to giant humans in the early 1900s; the article was published by World Daily News Report, a satirical website whose disclaimer page clarifies that it publishes content of a fictional nature.

In 2015, DeLonge founded an entertainment company called To The Stars, Inc. which, in 2017, he merged into a larger To The Stars Academy of Arts & Sciences. Aside from the entertainment division, the new company has aerospace and science divisions dedicated to ufology and the fringe science proposals of To The Stars' co-founder, Harold E. Puthoff. The evolution of the company was motivated by the contacts DeLonge has had with the Air Force establishment and high ranked people in aerospace companies collaborating with the Pentagon.

In a 2018 financial statement filed with the SEC, the company reported that it "has incurred losses from operations and has an accumulated deficit at June 30, 2018, of $37,432,000. These factors raise doubt about the Company's ability to continue as a going concern."

In 2019, the company produced the History Channel television show Unidentified: Inside America's UFO Investigation, about the USS Nimitz UFO incident, which also features DeLonge.

In April 2020, the Pentagon officially declassified three videos which had been previously leaked by people claiming they showed UFOs; DeLonge had previously released the videos through his company in 2017.

== Personal life ==
In 1996, DeLonge began dating Jennifer Jenkins, whom he had known since high school. They were married in Coronado, California, on May 26, 2001. The band Jimmy Eat World performed at the reception and DeLonge gave each groomsman, including Mark Hoppus, silver yo-yos from Tiffany's. The couple had a daughter and a son, before divorcing in 2019.

DeLonge married Rose-Marie Berryman in May 2021.

== Discography ==
=== Solo ===
- To the Stars... Demos, Odds and Ends (2015)

=== With Blink-182 ===
- Cheshire Cat (1995)
- Dude Ranch (1997)
- Enema of the State (1999)
- Take Off Your Pants and Jacket (2001)
- Blink-182 (2003)
- Neighborhoods (2011)
- One More Time... (2023)

=== With Box Car Racer ===
- Box Car Racer (2002)

=== With Angels and Airwaves ===
- We Don't Need to Whisper (2006)
- I-Empire (2007)
- Love (2010)
- Love: Part Two (2011)
- The Dream Walker (2014)
- Lifeforms (2021)

== Filmography ==
Year	Title	Actor	Director	Writer	Producer	Notes
1999	Idle Hands	Yes				Role: Burger Jungle Employee
1999	American Pie	Yes				Role: Garage band member
1999	Shake, Rattle and Roll: An American Love Story	Yes				Role: Jan Berry
1999	Two Guys and a Girl	Yes				Episode: "Au Revoir, Pizza Place"
1999	The Urethra Chronicles	Yes				Documentary
2001	Mad TV	Yes				Season 7, Episode 7
2002	The Urethra Chronicles II: Harder, Faster Faster, Harder	Yes				Documentary
2002	Box Car Racer	Yes				Documentary
2003	The Simpsons	Yes				Episode: "Barting Over"
2003	Riding in Vans with Boys	Yes			Yes	Documentary
2008	Start the Machine	Yes				Documentary
2009	One Nine Nine Four	Yes				Documentary
2009	I Know What I Saw				Yes	Documentary
2011	Love				Yes	
2011	My First Guitar	Yes				Documentary
2014	Poet Anderson: The Dream Walker		Yes	Yes	Yes	Short film
2019– 2020	Unidentified: Inside America's UFO Investigation	Yes			Yes	History Channel mini-series
2023	Monsters of California		Yes			
2026	Travis Barker: Louder Than Fear	Yes				Documentary

== Bibliography ==
Year	Title	Type	Note
2001	Blink-182: Tales From Beneath Your Mom	Biography	With Mark Hoppus, Travis Barker and Anne Hoppus
2013	The Lonely Astronaut On Christmas Eve	Children's book	Illustrated by Mike Henry
2015	Poet Anderson: The Dream Walker #1-3	Comic	With Ben Kull, illustrated by Djet
2015	Poet Anderson ...of Nightmares	Novel	With Suzanne Young
2015	Strange Times: The Curse of Superstition Mountain	Picture book	Illustrated by Edgar Martins, Sergio Martins and Carina Morais
2016	Sekret Machines: Book 1 – Chasing Shadows	Novel	With A.J. Hartley
2016	Strange Times: The Ghost in the Girl	Novel	With Geoff Herbach
2017	Cathedrals of Glass: A Planet of Blood and Ice	Novel	Foreword only, novel by A.J. Hartley
2017	Sekret Machines: Gods	Non-fiction	With Peter Levenda
2018	Poet Anderson: ...In Darkness	Novel	With Suzanne Young
2018	Sekret Machines: Book 2 – A Fire Within	Novel	With A.J. Hartley
2018	Who Here Knows Who Took My Clothes?	Picture book	Illustrated by Ryan Jones
2019	Sekret Machines: Man	Non-fiction	With Peter Levenda

== Works cited ==
- Hoppus, Anne (October 1, 2001). Blink-182: Tales from Beneath Your Mom. MTV Books / Pocket Books. ISBN 0743422074.
- Shooman, Joe (June 24, 2010). Blink-182: The Bands, The Breakdown & The Return. Independent Music Press. ISBN 9781906191108.
