= Who Here Knows Who Took My Clothes? =

Children's book by Tom DeLonge and Ryan Jones

- Author: Tom DeLonge
- Audio read by: Tom DeLonge
- Illustrator: Ryan Jones
- Language: English
- Genre: Children's literature (children's picture book)
- Published: November 30, 2018
- Publisher: To the Stars

Who Here Knows Who Took My Clothes? is an illustrated children's picture book written by Tom DeLonge of Blink-182, and illustrated by Ryan Jones. The book was released on November 30, 2018, through DeLonge's own To the Stars publishing company. Who Here Knows Who Took My Clothes? is DeLonge's second children's book, following 2013's The Lonely Astronaut On Christmas Eve illustrated by Mike Henry.

== Background ==
Who Here Knows Who Took My Clothes? was written before DeLonge's first children's book The Lonely Astronaut On Christmas Eve from 2013, but he lost his draft of the book. He was able to revive the project after a family member found a draft in an old journal of his. DeLonge enjoys writing children's books because the elements of poetry and rhyming schemes are similar to songwriting.

== Synopsis ==
While a man takes a bath, his clothes are stolen by an unknown and unseen thief. The man then wanders naked around his home, neighborhood, and town on a quest to answer the question, "Who here knows who took my clothes?" The quest ends in a cave, where he finds his clothes and the giggling monster who took them.

== Other media ==
First editions of Who Here Knows Who Took My Clothes? ordered directly through To the Stars included a limited-edition 7" flexi disc audiobook narrated by Tom DeLonge. After the first edition quickly sold out, To the Stars released an animated version of Who Here Knows Who Took My Clothes? on YouTube in 2019, which features the artwork of Ryan Jones animated by film editor Zach Passero and was also narrated by DeLonge. DeLonge met Jones through artist Gustavo Mendonca, who has worked on other To the Stars projects, and said of the collaboration: "Ryan's fun and rich artwork married perfectly with my sense of humor. Then Zach Passero and his incredible animation skills entered the picture and we wound up making something that I think is really special."
