= Mick O'Hare =

British editor and writer

Mick O'Hare (born 1964 in Mirfield, England) is a British journalist, author and editor.

== Life ==
Mick O'Hare is a freelance journalist, author and editor, specialising in the history of spaceflight, Cold War and Eastern European politics, general science, polar exploration, motorsport, rugby league and other sports, writing for numerous publications including The New World and The Independent. He is an obituary writer for The Times and The Guardian. He was formerly an editor at New Scientist, the leading British science weekly, where he edited "The Last Word" column, a collection of quirky questions and answers. O'Hare edited the bestselling books "Does Anything Eat Wasps?", which had sales of over half a million (539,532) and "Why Don’t Penguins’ Feet Freeze?", which topped three-quarters of a million (849,976) copies. O'Hare's books have been translated into more than 30 languages.

Prior to joining New Scientist in 1992, he was the production editor for Autosport. He has a geology degree.

== Bibliography ==
- Touch and Go: A History of Rugby League in London with Peter Lush and Dave Farrar
- Tries in the Valleys: A History of Rugby League in Wales with Peter Lush and Dave Farrar
- The Last Word: Vol 1, illustrated by Spike Gerrell
- The Last Word: More Questions and Answers on Everyday Science Vol 2, illustrated by Spike Gerrell
- Does Anything Eat Wasps? and 101 Other Questions
- How to Fossilise Your Hamster: And Other Amazing Experiments for the Armchair Scientist
- Why Don't Penguins' Feet Freeze?: And 114 Other Questions
- Do Polar Bears Get Lonely? And 101 Other Intriguing Science Questions
- How to Make a Tornado: The strange and wonderful things that happen when scientists break free
- Why Can't Elephants Jump? And 113 More Science Questions Answered
- Why Are Orangutans Orange: Science Questions in Pictures – With Fascinating Answers
- Will We Ever Speak Dolphin?: And 130 Other Science Questions Answered
- Question Everything
- Short Cuts Science: Navigate Your Way Through Big Ideas, (part author)
- Farts Aren't Invisible: Mind-blowing Facts From Science, History, Sport and the Universe
- Yawns Freeze Your Brain: More Mind-blowing Facts From Science, History, Life and the Universe
- Curious World: The Fastest, the Weirdest, the Loudest... of EVERYTHING
- Curious Animals: The Wildest, Weirdest, and Most Wonderful Animals on Earth
