= Strange Times: The Ghost in the Girl =

Book by Tom DeLonge and Geoff Herbach

- Author: Tom DeLonge; Geoff Herbach
- Language: English
- Genre: Science fiction
- Published: October 4, 2016
- Publisher: To the Stars; Simon & Schuster
- Pages: 288
- ISBN: 978-1943272211
- Preceded by: Strange Times: The Curse of Superstition Mountain

Strange Times: The Ghost in the Girl is a science fiction young adult novel created by Tom DeLonge, current co-lead vocalist/guitarist of Blink-182 and Angels & Airwaves, and novelist Geoff Herbach. The book was released on October 4, 2016 through DeLonge's To the Stars company. It's the first part of a planned trilogy of novels and follows the 2015 graphic novel Strange Times: The Curse of Superstition Mountain.

DeLonge describes the book as being loosely based on his childhood. He said, "This is a story reflecting some of the peripheral moments in my life. Of a suburban kid who grew up breaking rules, getting kicked out of high school, and obsessively looking for the more unusual and imaginative experiences that this world has to offer."

== Synopsis ==
Former athlete Charlie Wilkins and a group of eighth-grade outcasts—Wiz who loves science, Riley who comes from a broken home, and skaters Mouse and Mattheson—try to solve the mystery of his missing father, a member of the US Air Force who vanishes during a secret mission. The boys are visited by a ghost girl who needs their help and is also connected to Charlie's family.

== Adaptation ==
In 2017, DeLonge announced he would make his directorial debut with a film based on his Strange Times series, co-written by Ben Kull. Stan Spry and Eric Woods from The Cartel and Russell Binder from Striker Entertainment were attached to the project as producers, while Angels & Airwaves was expected to compose new music for the film's score. However, a year later in 2018, the project evolved into a TV show for TBS. DeLonge described his vision for the show as a "science fiction Disney" and hopes to create a soundtrack with music from his favorite punk bands including the Descendents and Bad Religion. There has been no news on the project since then.
