= Unidentified: Inside America's UFO Investigation =

- Genre: Docudrama
- Country of origin: United States
- Original language: English
- No. of seasons: 2
- No. of episodes: 14

Production
- Executive producers: Anthony Lappé; Kristy Sabat; Mike Stiller; Steve Ascher; Tom DeLonge
- Running time: 40 minutes

Original release
- Network: History Channel
- Release: May 31, 2019 – August 22, 2020

Unidentified: Inside America's UFO Investigation is a History Channel television series exploring a secret investigation into unidentified flying objects (UFOs) that was conducted by the U.S. government, the existence of which had come to light less than two years prior to airing. It features former military counterintelligence officer Luis Elizondo, who directed the Defense Intelligence Agency's Advanced Aerospace Threat Identification Program, and Christopher Mellon, former United States Deputy Assistant Secretary of Defense for Intelligence. Elizondo says that he resigned after he became frustrated that the government was not taking UFOs, which he considered to be a national security threat, seriously enough.

Executive producer Tom DeLonge (lead guitarist of rock band Blink-182) has claimed to be "the military's chosen vessel for UFO disclosure". Leslie Kean, author of the best-selling book about UFO disclosure UFOs: Generals, Pilots, and Government Officials Go on the Record, suggested that these revelations were actually such disclosure: "Elizondo confirmed that UFOs are real; they exist, and they have been officially documented, answering a question so many have debated and speculated about for decades."

Though initially announced to be a limited miniseries, History greenlit a second season in September 2019 after clips from Unidentified, which had gained a certain degree of popularity, were confirmed by the U.S. Navy to be authentic footage of unexplained aerial objects.

== Episodes ==
Season	Episodes	Originally released	
Season	Episodes	First released	Last released
1	6	May 31, 2019	July 5, 2019
2	8	July 11, 2020	August 22, 2020

=== Season 1 ===
No. overall	No. in season	Title	Original release date	U.S. viewers (millions)
1	1	"The UFO Insiders"	May 31, 2019	N/A
2	2	"Raining UFOs"	June 7, 2019	N/A
3	3	"The Pattern Revealed"	June 14, 2019	N/A
4	4	"UFO Fleet"	June 21, 2019	N/A
5	5	"The Atomic Connection"	June 28, 2019	N/A
6	6	"The Revelation"	July 5, 2019	N/A

=== Season 2 ===
No. overall	No. in season	Title	Original release date	U.S. viewers (millions)
7	1	"UFOs in Combat"	July 11, 2020	N/A
8	2	"The Triangle Mystery"	July 18, 2020	N/A
9	3	"UFOs vs. Nukes"	July 25, 2020	N/A
10	4	"Planetary Threat"	August 1, 2020	N/A
11	5	"Airline Encounters"	August 8, 2020	N/A
12	6	"The UFO Cover-up"	August 15, 2020	N/A
13	7	"Sightings Surge"	August 22, 2020	N/A
14	8	"Extraterrestrial Encounters"	August 22, 2020	N/A

== Featured incidents ==
- Pentagon UFO videos
- Canneto di Caronia fires (Season 1, Episode 6, 'The Revelation')
- Black Triangles (Season 2, Episode 2, 'The Triangle Mystery')
