= Shakespeare Bulletin =

- Discipline: Literature, Performing arts
- Language: English
- Edited by: Peter Kirwan

Publication details
- History: 1982-present
- Publisher: Johns Hopkins University Press (2005-current); University of West Georgia (2004-2005); Lafayette College (1983-2003) (United States)
- Frequency: Quarterly

Standard abbreviations
- ISO 4: Shakespeare Bull.

Indexing
- ISSN: 0748-2558 (print); 1931-1427 (web)
- OCLC no.: 61314128

Links
- Journal homepage; Online access; Twitter; Facebook

Shakespeare Bulletin is an academic journal founded in 1982. The journal focuses exclusively on performance studies and scholarly treatment of Shakespearean and early modern drama on stage and screen. Each issue contains original articles as well as theatre, film, and book reviews. Theatre coverage encompasses the United States, Canada, the United Kingdom, and many other countries. From 1983 through 2003 the journal was published by Lafayette College with James P. Lusardi and June Schlueter serving as co-editors. In 1992 the Bulletin incorporated the Shakespeare on Film Newsletter, which had been in publication since 1976.

In 2004 Lusardi and Schlueter were succeeded as editor by Andrew James Hartley at which time the publisher of the Shakespeare Bulletin changed to the University of West Georgia. That institution published the journal until it was succeeded by Johns Hopkins University Press (JHUP), beginning with the volume 23, No. 4, Winter 2005 edition of the journal. As of 2024, the JHUP continues to publish the Shakespeare Bulletin. The current editor is Dr Peter Kirwan of Mary Baldwin University in the United States.

The journal is published quarterly in Spring, Summer, Fall, and Winter by the Johns Hopkins University Press. Annually, the journal publishes approximately 20 articles, 40-50 theatre/film reviews and a number of reviews of performance-oriented books.

Special issues have covered such issues as 'Shakespeare and Social Justice in Contemporary Performance', 'Labor in Contemporary Shakespeare Performance, the relationship between early modern drama and contemporary realist performance, and the work of Derek Jarman.

Essays are reviewed anonymously, and the journal has a series of published guidelines on best scholarly practice for transparent, supportive, and rigorous peer review and editing processes.

== See also ==
- Shakespeare's plays
- English Renaissance theatre
- Shakespeare on screen
