= Sekret Machines: Gods =

Book by Tom DeLonge

- Author: Tom DeLonge; Peter Levenda
- Language: English
- Genre: Non-fiction
- Published: March 7, 2017
- Publisher: To the Stars; Simon & Schuster
- Pages: 454
- ISBN: 978-1943272235
- Followed by: Sekret Machines: Man

Sekret Machines: Gods (sometimes referred to as Gods, Man & War: Volume 1) is a ufology book created by Tom DeLonge, American musician, co-lead vocalist/guitarist of Blink-182, and Angels & Airwaves, and American occult novelist Peter Levenda. The book was co-published by DeLonge's own To the Stars company and Simon & Schuster on March 7, 2017. Gods is the second book in the overall Sekret Machines franchise following 2016's Sekret Machines: Book 1 – Chasing Shadows, and the first volume in the series' companion trilogy Gods, Man & War. The first edition includes a foreword written by Jacques Vallée, who previously worked for NASA, worked on ARPANET and has become a prominent figure in UFO research.

== Background ==
October 2015 email conversations between DeLonge and John Podesta, the chairman for the Hillary Clinton 2016 presidential campaign at the time, regarding research for Gods were leaked online during the Podesta emails controversy prior to the book's publication. After the leak, DeLonge stopped using Podesta as a source for the book.

== Synopsis ==
Peter Levenda described Gods as "a new approach to religion that takes a hard look at religious texts and ideas from around the world to discern the traces of an event that changed us forever." The content in Gods was described in the official synopsis as being "foundational" to understanding the material in the Gods, Man & War trilogy.

As with Chasing Shadows, Gods was based on "interviews with scientists, engineers, intelligence officers and military officials."

== Reception ==
Greg M. Schwartz of PopMatters said it's "not as good a read as Chasing Shadows" because of the change of genres, and that it "functions like a more academic dive into Ancient Aliens territory, also based around intel from Delonge's 'high-level sources.'" Schwartz concluded: "Sekret Machines:Gods delivers some compelling explorations of what the big cosmic picture looks like and the project lays out a detailed roadmap for exploring important historical aspects of the Phenomenon. What the intergalactic puzzle really looks like when all the pieces are in place remains the great mystery of our time, and the motivations of DeLonge's advisors should be held up to the same scrutiny as the motivations of Earth's visitors. But the project is at least helping to push the discussion forward, an action that is long overdue from the American powers that be."
