= Geoff Herbach =

American novelist (born 1969)

- Born: October 30, 1969 (age 57); Dubuque, Iowa, U.S.
- Education: University of Wisconsin--Madison
- Occupations: Professor, author
- Spouse: Stephanie Wilbur Ash
- Writing career
- Notable awards: Cybils Award, 2011, for Stupid Fast; Minnesota Book Award, 2013, for Nothing Special, Elizabeth Burr/Worzalla Award, 2020, for "Cracking the Bell".
- Website: geoffherbach.com

Geoff Herbach (born October 30, 1969) is an American novelist. Born in Dubuque, Iowa, on October 30, 1969, Herbach grew up in Platteville, Wisconsin. He is an alumnus of the University of Wisconsin–Madison and Hamline University in Saint Paul, Minnesota, where he earned a Master of Fine Arts degree in creative writing. He is the author of one picture book and nine novels, including The Miracle Letters of T. Rimberg, The Stupid Fast Trilogy, Fat Boy Vs. The Cheerleaders, and Hooper. Stupid Fast won the 2011 Cybils Award in the Young Adult Fiction category. Nothing Special won the 2013 Minnesota Book Award for Young People's literature. Cracking the Bell won the 2020 Elizabeth Burr/Worzalla Award for Outstanding Artistic Achievement by a Wisconsin author.

Herbach also wrote and performed comedy. He was a co-creator and writer for Electric Arc Radio, Radio Happy Hour, Powderkeg Live, and The Lit 6 Project, and co-wrote the musical "Don’t Crush Our Heart".

Herbach has published stories in the Minneapolis Star Tribune, The Middle West Review, MnArtists, American Nerd and presented on Minnesota Public Radio.

Herbach resides in Mankato, Minnesota, where he teaches creative writing at Minnesota State University, Mankato. He is married to writer Stephanie Wilbur Ash and has many children.

== Books ==
- The Miracle Letters of T. Rimberg (2008)
- Stupid Fast (2011)
- Nothing Special (2012)
- I'm with Stupid (2013)
- Fat Boy Vs. the Cheerleaders (2014)
- Anything You Want (2016)
- Strange Times: The Ghost in the Girl (2016)
- Hair-Apocalypse (2017)
- Hooper (2018)
- Cracking the Bell (2019)
