= Peter Levenda =

American author

- Born: 1950 or 1951 (age 75–76)
- Citizenship: American
- Education: Florida International University
- Notable work: Unholy Alliance

Peter Levenda (born 1950 or 1951) is an American author who has written extensively about occult history. He is best known for his 1995 book Unholy Alliance, which is about Esoteric Hitlerism and Nazi occultism. He also wrote about the Nazi escape routes in his book Ratline: Soviet Spies, Nazi Priests, and the Disappearance of Adolf Hitler (2012), in which he opined that Hitler faked his death in April 1945 using misleading forensic evidence.

Occultist Alan Cabal wrote in 2003 that Levenda was the author of the Simon Necronomicon (using the pseudonym "Simon") a literary hoax that derives its title from H. P. Lovecraft's fictional Necronomicon. The United States Copyright Office registration for Simon's 2006 publication Gates of the Necronomicon lists the author as Peter Levenda under the pseudonym Simon, but Levenda has denied the identification.

== Works ==
- Unholy Alliance: A History of Nazi Involvement with the Occult (1994) ISBN 978-0826414090.
  - Unholy Alliance: A History of Nazi Involvement with the Occult, second edition (2002)
  - Unholy Alliance: A History of Nazi Involvement with the Occult, new expanded edition (2019)
- Dead Names: The Dark History of the Necronomicon (2005) ISBN 978-0060787042.
- Sinister Forces - The Nine, A Grimoire of American Political Witchcraft, Book 1 (2005)
- Sinister Forces - A Warm Gun, A Grimoire of American Political Witchcraft, Book 2 (2005)
- Allianza Malefica / Unholy Alliance: The Nazis and the Power of the Occult (2006)
- Sinister Forces - The Manson Secret, A Grimoire of American Political Witchcraft, Book 3 (2006)
- Gates of the Necronomicon (as Simon) (2006)
- The Mao of Business: Guerrilla Trade Techniques for the New China (2007)
- Stairway to Heaven: Chinese Alchemists, Jewish Kabbalists, and the Art of Spiritual Transformation (2008)
- The Secret Temple: Masons, Mysteries, and the Founding of America (2009)
- Tantric Temples: Eros and Magic in Java (2011)
- Ratline: Soviet Spies, Nazi Priests, and the Disappearance of Adolf Hitler (2012)
- The Angel And The Sorcerer (2012)
- The Dark Lord: H. P. Lovecraft, Kenneth Grant, and the Typhonian Tradition in Magic (2013)
- The Hitler Legacy: The Nazi Cult in Diaspora, How it was Organized, How it was Funded, and Why it Remains a Threat to Global Security in the Age of Terrorism (2014)
- The Tantric Alchemist: Thomas Vaughan and the Indian Tantric Tradition (2015)
- The Lovecraft Code (2016)
- Sekret Machines: Gods, with Tom DeLonge (2017)
- Dunwich (2018)
- Starry Wisdom (2019)
- Sekret Machines: Man, with Tom DeLonge (2019)
- Rites of the Mummy: The K'rla Cell and the Secret Key to Liber AL, with Jeffrey D. Evans (2021)
- Sekret Machines: War, with Tom DeLonge (2024)
- Sinister Forces: A Grimoire of American Political Witchcraft, twentieth anniversary omnibus edition (2026)
