= Poet Anderson: The Dream Walker =

- Directed by: Tom DeLonge; Edgar Martins; Sergio Martins
- Written by: Tom DeLonge; Edgar Martins; Sergio Martins; Ben Kull
- Based on: Characters created by Tom DeLonge
- Produced by: Ben Kull
- Starring: August Roads; Amanda Douglas; Wiremu Davidson; Kari DeLonge
- Music by: Angels & Airwaves
- Production companies: Poet Productions, LLC; To the Stars
- Release date: December 9, 2014
- Running time: 15 minutes
- Countries: United States; Portugal
- Language: English

Poet Anderson: The Dream Walker is a 2014 animated short film directed by Tom DeLonge, Edgar Martins, and Sergio Martins. The film focuses on the title character Poet, who discovers his guardian angel and destiny inside the Dream World, an alternate universe created by humankind's shared unconscious thoughts. The film features music from DeLonge's rock group Angels & Airwaves.

DeLonge had the concept for the character dating back a decade before writing an initial screenplay. Inspired by films such as Blade Runner and A Clockwork Orange, as well as anime such as Aoki Densetsu Shoot! and Akira, initial concept art by Mike Henry was later developed into designs by Sergio and Edgar Martins, Portuguese animators who contacted DeLonge unsolicited online. The brothers put together a small team and independently worked on the project over a two-year period.

The story of the short is intended to be the first in an overarching multimedia project that spans books, a graphic novel, and an eventual feature-length film. The film was released alongside the Angels & Airwaves album The Dream Walker on December 9, 2014. It won Best Animated Film at the Toronto International Short Film Festival.

== Plot ==
Poet Anderson, a lucid dreamer, is led into an alternate universe where he meets his guardian angel, the Dream Walker, as well as his greatest fear, the Night Terror. Poet must confront his demons as his real life and dream world collide.

== Production ==
Literally, half of our life is spent doing this thing we know very little about, and yet we write it off as not being important. I think it's an interesting exercise to dig into them and find out what dreams mean.

— Tom DeLonge

DeLonge first created the Poet character in 1999 in a hotel room in Paris. The character is largely based upon him; the character design includes dark bangs that DeLonge sported previously. The film's script also takes influence from a study conducted by Stanford University on nightmares, positing that they prepare humans for real-world events. The film was inspired by Blade Runner and A Clockwork Orange.

In 2012, Portuguese animator Sergio Martins sent DeLonge an animated incarnation of a rabbit, a logo for DeLonge's band Blink-182. Martins informed DeLonge he was open for animation work, and DeLonge invited he and his twin brother, Edgar Martins, to work on the film. Based on concept art from Mike Henry, they organized a small team of artists to animate the film. The film's animation is an unorthodox mix between Flash animation and computer animation, achieved through Blender and XSI. DeLonge gave the Martins brothers a large level of creative freedom: they were responsible for re-writing the film's script, developing the characters and the film's setting. This was based on a mutual admiration for the Japanese anime Aoki Densetsu Shoot!.

== Reception ==
=== Awards ===
Poet Anderson won Best Animated Film at the Toronto International Short Film Festival.

== See also ==
- The Dream Walker
- Waking Life, a 2001 animated film directed by Richard Linklater that touches on similar themes including the nature of reality, dreams, and consciousness
