= John Greenewald Jr. =

American researcher and ufologist

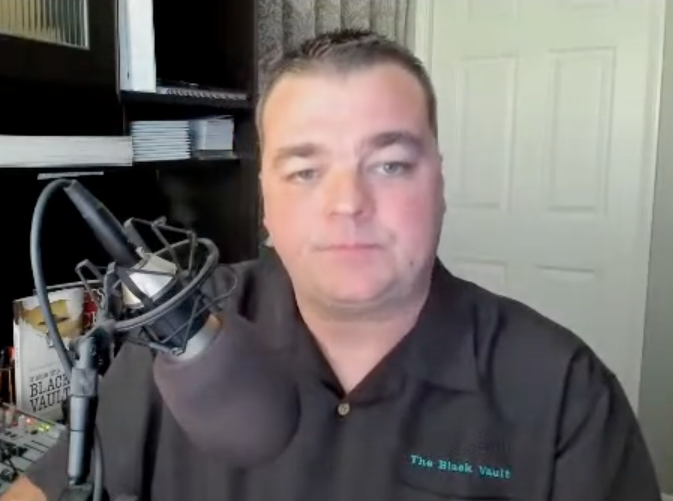
- Greenewald on the Max Moszkowicz show.
- Born: April 17, 1981 (age 45)
- Citizenship: United States
- Known for: The Black Vault, FOIA activist, classified information releases.
- Website: www.theblackvault.com

John Greenewald Jr. (born April 17, 1981) is an American researcher and ufologist, best known as the founder of The Black Vault, a digital archive containing millions of pages of United States government documents obtained through the Freedom of Information Act. His work has been described by The Washington Post as a "civilian repository" of such records, and he has published material ranging from MKUltra papers to declassified Pentagon UFO videos. Greenewald has written several books on government secrecy and has appeared in media including the UFO documentary series.

== Early life ==
Greenewald grew up in the San Fernando Valley in California as a child and lived in Northridge, California. His father was a United States Marine and his grandfather served in the United States Navy. Greenewald attended Alemany High School in Mission Hills, Los Angeles. He was 15 years old in 1996 when began the Black Vault project. Greenewald later filed FOIA reports to obtain information on his ancestors who served in government. Greenewald's parents were supportive of his research.

== Career ==
=== The Black Vault ===
Greenewald operates the document archive site The Black Vault, a website which retrieves and archives documents obtained using the Freedom of Information Act. The Independent described The Black Vault as "a US government transparency site." The Washington Post identified Greenewalds works as a "massive civilian repository of government documents mostly obtained by Freedom of Information Act requests." By 2015, Greenewald had filed over 5,000 FOIA requests.

He credits his interests in FOIA and UFOs to early experiences on America Online (AOL). While online in the early Internet, he found the Computer UFO Network (CUFON) and read about a reported UFO incident involving Iran in 1976. Greenewald filed a FOIA for the same documents he read online over AOL, and to his surprise received the exact same document two weeks later from the Defense Intelligence Agency (DIA). As a result, Greenewald began filing more FOIA requests, and began building a collection of his findings. One of Greenewald's first FOIA requests as a child was for MKUltra documents. In his early days, Greenewald due to technical limitations was forced to hand-type all his retrieved documents onto Internet pages. In 1999, Greenewald told the Los Angeles Daily News that he'd yet to personally see anything "unusual" in the sky, and that it's "fun to think the CIA is working for me."

Greenewald was credited by ABC News and Vice magazine with uploading 130,000 declassified documents from Project Blue Book, which was the code name for the systematic study of unidentified flying objects (UFOs) by the United States Air Force from March 1952 to its termination on December 17, 1969. His research has been described by Greenwald as apolitical, focusing only on government transparency. Greenewald reported to Vice that his website's visits increased after his release of the Project Blue Book materials from approximately 5,000 per day to "hundreds of thousands".

Following the release of the Pentagon UFO videos, The Black Vault made a Freedom of Information request of the Government for the release of more video footage, filed to the US Navy in April 2020. Some two years later, the government confirmed it had more footage, but refused to release it, citing concerns for national security.

In 2024, Greenewald, via The Black Vault, published documents related to biting incidents involving Commander, a German shepherd kept by Joe Biden at the White House. The documents were released due to a Freedom of Information Act request by Greenewald.

For his Black Vault work, Greenewald has worked with and relied on assistance from the public and Internet users, such as when he engaged in a years-long FOIA struggle with the Central Intelligence Agency; his work there included support from Reddit users. Greenewald developed his own customized search engine database, and then supplemental custom databases, to support his research.

Greenewald does not consider himself a journalist. Vice reported that Greenewald does not receive a journalism or public-interest waiver for his U.S. government FOIA requests, and has to pay money for them. Greenewald in the past has relied on GoFundMe programs to help support his research due to the costs. Greenewald reported he makes nearly no profit from The Black Vault.

=== Ufology ===
In terms of ufology theories, Greenewald in 2015 expressed support to Vice for the extraterrestrial UFO hypothesis and that he did "not yet" support the interdimensional UFO hypothesis.

=== Other work ===
Greenewald has worked as a bartender, as well as a documentary and television producer and writer. His primary business was reported by Columbia Journalism Review to be not his website, but instead importing and selling audio-visual equipment to schools and businesses.

== Media coverage ==
Featured in a 1999 NBC program that discussed his research, host Robert Davi referred to Greenewald as a "folk hero" and "nuisance to the United States government." The show's popularity caused his site to crash. The Los Angeles Daily News reported in 1999 that Greenewald appeared on television after a story about him was published in a newspaper from Baltimore.

The Dayton Daily News quoted Greenewald in 2015 on matters of government secrecy. He said, "I've been fascinated with government documents what they don't want us to know. I just people to see history." In 2017, Greenewald was reported by Vox to have been investigating reports about alleged "alien mummies" from Peru. In 2021, Greenewald appeared in the documentary series UFO produced by JJ Abrams. The Jerusalem Post spoke with Greenewald in 2024 after an alleged UFO sighting over the United States Capitol building.

Greenewald hosts a podcast to discuss his documents and findings, described by Shaun Raviv in the Columbia Journalism Review as "popular".

== Reception ==
The United States Department of Justice has identified Greenewald as part of a "FOIA posse", along with journalist Jason Leopold.

The cofounder of MuckRock, Michael Morisy, has called Greenewald's work "groundbreaking".

== Views ==
According to Greenewald, the "best feeling in the world" is obtaining a FOIA declassified document that no one in the public had seen before him. In the past, Greenewald has expressed support for theories the U.S. government shot down United Airlines Flight 93.

== Books ==
- Beyond UFO Secrecy: The Story of the Black Vault's Pursuit of the Truth. Galde Press, 2008. ISBN 978-0972484909.
- Inside The Black Vault: The Government's UFO Secrets Revealed. Rowman & Littlefield, 2019.
- Secrets from the Black Vault: The Army's Plan for a Military Base on the Moon and Other Declassified Documents that Rewrote History. Rowman & Littlefield, 2020.
