= The Black Vault =

American declassified document website

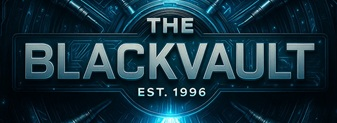
- Website type: Document archive
- Available in: English
- Owner: John Greenewald Jr.
- Website: theblackvault.com
- Launched: 1996; 30 years ago
- Current status: Active

The Black Vault is an American online archive of declassified government documents founded in 1996 by ufologist and researcher John Greenewald Jr. Created when Greenewald was a teenager, the site began as a personal project to collect and digitize records released through the Freedom of Information Act. The site is a civilian repository of federal records and contains millions of files spanning subjects from CIA programs such as MKUltra to Project Blue Book and other investigations of UFOs.

The archive has been cited by major media outlets including The Washington Post, USA Today, and has been described by the Post as a "massive civilian repository of government documents." Beyond its document collections, the Black Vault operates a podcast and has served as a source of information for journalists, researchers, and the public seeking insight into the workings of the U.S. government.

== Background ==
Greenewald credits his interest in the Freedom of Information Act (FOIA) to early experiences on America Online (AOL). While online in the early internet, Greenewald found the Computer UFO Network (CUFON) and read about a reported UFO incident involving Iran in 1976. Greenewald filed a FOIA request for document he read on AOL, and to his surprise received the exact same document two weeks later from the Defense Intelligence Agency. As a result, Greenewald began filing more FOIA requests and building a collection of his findings. One of Greenewald's first FOIA requests as a child was for MKUltra documents. Greenewald described his research as apolitical, focusing only on government transparency.

== The Black Vault ==
Greenewald created the Black Vault in 1996 when he was fifteen years old. The site's original name was "John's World", and it became the "Black Vault" about a year later. The Black Vault's scope of coverage includes Central Intelligence Agency (CIA) programs like MKUltra, the 2012 Benghazi attack in Libya, and UFOs. In 2020, the Columbia Journalism Review reported that all Federal government of the United States documents in the archive had been obtained through FOIA requests. The Washington Post described the project as a "massive civilian repository of government documents" in 2019. The Independent described The Black Vault as "a US government transparency site."

Early in the project, limited web hosting storage meant that Greenewald typed declassified documents into the site's web pages instead of uploading scanned copies. Over time, the Black Vault developed a system of documenting coding schemes and databases to track and facilitate the growing collections of documents. An anonymous user was reported to have purchased Greenewald a $400 digital scanner to speed his work. By 2015, Greenewald had filed over 5,000 FOIA requests for the Black Vault. In the same year, ABC News said that the Black Vault reported hosting 1,322,017 declassified government documents since the 1996 launch of the site. In 2020, Columbia Journalism Review reported the Black Vault archives contained over two million files. Greenewald told Vice that the Black Vault's visits increased after his release of the Project Blue Book materials from approximately 5,000 per day in 2015 to "hundreds of thousands". By 2018, the site was reportedly receiving 14,000 to 18,000 visitors per day. The Columbia Journalism Review reported that the Black Vault drew 300,000 unique monthly visitors as of 2020, who download 10 terabytes of declassified government documents per month.

For his Black Vault work, Greenewald has worked with and relied on assistance from the public and internet users, such as when he engaged in a years-long FOIA struggle with the CIA; his work there included support from Reddit users. Greenewald developed his own customized search engine database, and then supplemental custom databases, to support his research. In 2018, Greenewald told Vice that the CIA had denied a fee waiver for his request for missing MKUltra records. He sought crowdfunding through GoFundMe to cover the reproduction costs. Greenewald has referred to the Black Vault as a "hobby", saying "there's no money to be made by giving out information for free."

In 2020, the Columbia Journalism Review reported that Black Vault work and materials had been cited by the Washington Post, USA Today, Newsweek, Popular Mechanics, Wired, The Intercept, and Vice Media.

The Black Vault operates a podcast named either Inside the Black Vault or The Black Vault Radio depending on the hosting platform.

== UFO-related records ==
The Black Vault collects and publishes declassified government records concerning unidentified flying objects (UFOs), including CIA documents obtained through FOIA requests. It has also sought the release of military UFO footage, including videos withheld by the United States Navy on national security grounds.

=== Project Blue Book collection ===
Project Blue Book was the codename for the systematic study of unidentified flying objects (UFOs) by the United States Air Force (USAF) from March 1952 to its termination on December 17, 1969. The project, headquartered at Wright-Patterson Air Force Base, Ohio, was initially directed by Captain Edward J. Ruppelt and followed projects of a similar nature such as Project Sign established in 1947, and Project Grudge in 1949. In 2015, the Black Vault was credited by ABC News, CNET and Vice magazine with uploading 129,491 declassified documents from the three projects. The Black Vault's Blue Book collection covers over 10,000 cases formally investigated by the USAF. The organized Blue Book collection includes declassified federal government UFO data from Project Blue Book, Project Sign and Project Grudge, spanning U.S government research from 1947 to 1969. Greenwald personally digitized and made available all the pages to the public on the Black Vault, described by ABC News as a "painstaking effort".

=== CIA UFO documents ===
In 2021, the Smithsonian Magazine, The Independent, Vice, and Live Science reported on the Black Vault's publication of then-newly released CIA UFO documents. Smithsonian Magazine reported the Black Vault had publicized 2,780 pages of CIA-related UFO documents obtained via FOIA. Black Vault founder Greenewald told Vice the material was purchased from the CIA in 2020 on CD-ROM, and per the CIA it "represents all its documents" on the matter. The Independent wrote that "there is no way to verify that". Greenewald told Live Science that the documents were the result of decades of Black Vault FOIA requests to the CIA.

=== Pentagon UFO videos ===
The Pentagon UFO videos are forward-looking infrared (FLIR) recordings taken from United States Navy (USN) fighter jets aboard the USS Nimitz and USS Theodore Roosevelt in 2004, 2014, and 2015, with further footage captured by USN personnel in 2019. The USN formally declassified the videos in 2020. The following day, the Black Vault filed FOIA requests seeking "any and all other videos related to UAP." In 2022, the U.S. government confirmed to the Black Vault the existence of additional UAP-related videos but withheld them on national security grounds.

== Other government records ==
The Black Vault has published records on U.S. intelligence programs, including the CIA's MKUltra experiments. Its FOIA requests have also obtained Secret Service records concerning biting incidents involving Commander, President Joe Biden's dog.

=== CIA robot dragonfly program ===
In the 1970s, the United States CIA's research and development office created the Insectothopter, a miniature unmanned aerial vehicle. A prototype went on display at the CIA Museum in 2003. In 2013, the Black Vault filed a FOIA request for records on the program, and in 2020 the CIA released the files in response.

=== Commander (Joe Biden's dog) ===
In 2024, the Black Vault published Secret Service documents detailing biting incidents involving Commander, President Joe Biden's German shepherd at the White House. The records were released in response to a Freedom of Information Act request filed by Greenewald.

=== MKUltra files ===
MKUltra was an illegal human experimentation program run by the U.S. Central Intelligence Agency (CIA) to develop interrogation techniques using drugs and psychological methods such as brainwashing and psychological torture. When Greenewald was 15, one of his first FOIA requests for the Black Vault was for MKUltra documents. The materials were delivered on four CD-ROMs, and Greenewald told Vice that MKUltra quickly became one of the most viewed parts of the website.

In 2016, Greenewald discovered that his 2004 release of MKUltra documents was incomplete. A total of 4,358 pages listed in an index had been omitted from the CIA's 2004 response. Over the next two years, the Black Vault pressed the agency for the missing files, at one point submitting 97 printed pages of evidence showing the omissions. The CIA admitted in 2016 that the documents had been withheld 12 years earlier, but the files were not released because they involved "behavioral modification" programs.

== See also ==
- Cryptome
