= Cryptome =

Document archive website

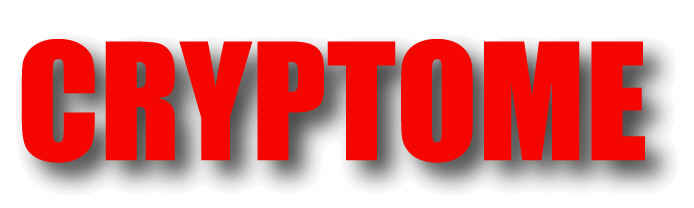
- Website type: Document archive
- Available in: English
- Editors: John Young; Deborah Natsios
- Website: Official website
- Launched: June 1996; 30 years ago
- Current status: Active

Cryptome is an online library and 501(c)(3) private foundation created in 1996 by John Young and Deborah Natsios closed in 2023 and reopened soon afterward. The site collected information about freedom of expression, privacy, cryptography, dual-use technologies, national security, intelligence, and government secrecy.

Cryptome was known for publishing the alleged identities of people associated with the CIA, the Stasi, and the PSIA and British intelligence. Cryptome was one of the early organizers of WikiLeaks and published the alleged internal emails of the WikiLeaks organization. Cryptome republished the already public surveillance disclosures of Edward Snowden and claimed in June 2014 that they would publish all unreleased Snowden documents later that month.

Cryptome has received praise from organizations such as the Electronic Frontier Foundation (EFF), but has also been the subject of criticism and controversy. WikiLeaks has accused Cryptome of forging emails and some of Cryptome's posted documents have been called an "invitation to terrorists." The website has also been criticized for posting maps and pictures of "dangerous Achilles' heel[s] in the domestic infrastructure," which The New York Times called a "tip off [to] terrorists." ABC News also criticized them for posting information that terrorists could use to plan attacks. They continued to post controversial materials including guides on "how to attack critical infrastructure" in addition to other instructions for illegal hacking "for those without the patience to wait for whistleblowers". Cryptome has also received criticism for its handling of embarrassing and private information.

== People ==
=== John Young ===
John Young was born in 1935. He grew up in West Texas where his father worked in the oil field, construction and on a decommissioned Texas POW camp, and Young later served in the United States Army Corps of Engineers in Germany (1953–1956) and earned degrees in philosophy and architecture from Rice University (1957–1963) and his graduate degree in architecture from Columbia University in 1969. A self-identified radical, he became an activist and helped create community service group Urban Deadline, where his fellow student-activists initially suspected him of being a police spy. Urban Deadline went on to receive citations from the Citizens Union of the City of New York and the New York City Council, and which later evolved into Cryptome. His work earned him a position on the nominating committee for the Chrysler Award for Innovation in Design in 1998.

He received citations from the American Society of Mechanical Engineers, the American Society of Civil Engineers and the Legal Aid Society. In 1993, he was awarded the Certificate of Special Congressional Recognition. He stated that he didn't "acknowledge the power of the law."

Young died on March 28, 2025, at the age of 89.

=== Deborah Natsios ===
Deborah Natsios grew up in CIA safe houses across Europe, Asia and South America reserved for covert CIA station chiefs. She later received her graduate degree in architecture from Princeton University. She has taught architecture and urban design at Columbia University and Parsons The New School for Design, and held seminars at the Pratt Institute and the University of Texas. She is the principal of Natsios Young Architects.

In addition to being co-editor for Cryptome, she is responsible for the associated project Cartome, which was founded in 2011 and posts her original critical art and graphical images and other public resources to document sensitive areas. She additionally holds a degree in mathematics from Smith College. She has given talks at the USENIX Annual Technical Conference and Architectures of Fear: Terrorism and the Future of Urbanism in the West, and written on topics ranging from architectural theory to defenses of Jim Bell and assassination politics. She is a notable critic of Edward Snowden.

==== Family ====
Natsios is the daughter of Nicholas Natsios, who served as CIA station chief in Greece from 1948–1956, in Vietnam from 1956–1960, in France from 1960–1962, in South Korea from 1962–1965, in Argentina from 1965–1969, in the Netherlands from 1969–1972, and in Iran from 1972–1974. While stationed in Vietnam, his deputy was William Colby, the future Director of Central Intelligence. His name was included in the 1996 membership directory of the Association of Former Intelligence Officers, which Cryptome helped to publish. Cryptome acknowledged its link to Nicholas Natsios in 2000.

== Policies ==
Young has said of Cryptome, "We do expect to get false documents but it's not our job to sort that out." In another interview, Young promoted skepticism about all sources of information, saying: "Facts are not a trustworthy source of knowledge. Cryptome is not an authoritative source." When asked about providing context for material, Young said, "We do not believe in 'context.' That is authoritarian nonsense. For the same reason, we do not believe in verification, authentication, background."

The front page of the Cryptome website states that "documents are removed from this site only by order served directly by a US court having jurisdiction. No court order has ever been served; any order served will be published here – or elsewhere if gagged by order." However, documents have been removed at the request of both law enforcement as well as individuals.

Cryptome has warned users that they do not have technical measures to protect the anonymity of their sources, saying "don’t send us stuff and think that we’ll protect you."

== History ==
- 1993: Young and Natsios get on the internet.
- 1994: What became Cryptome began with Young and Natsios's participation in the Cypherpunks electronic mailing list and Urban Deadline. Natsios called this time "seminal" and "transformative" for the internet.
- 1996: Cryptome was officially created out of their architectural practice.
- 1999: In October journalist Declan McCullagh wrote about Young's perusal of the site's access logs.
- 2000: Cartome was founded. In July, two FBI agents spoke with Cryptome on the phone after Cryptome published a Public Security Intelligence Agency personnel file. The file listed 400 names, birthdates, and titles, notably included Director General Hidenao Toyoshima. The FBI expressed concerns over the file, but admitted it was legal to publish in the United States but not Japan. After speculation that the documents may have come from someone called "Shigeo Kifuji", Cryptome identified the source as Hironari Noda.
- 2003: In January 2003, Cryptome received a grand jury subpoena for site access logs from Massachusetts. Cryptome responded by saying that there were no logs. Later that year, the FBI visited Cryptome to discuss recent postings "intended to expose national security gaps."
- 2004: New York City removed warning signs around gas mains after Cryptome posts pictures of them, citing security concerns.
- 2006: Cryptome became one of the early organizers of WikiLeaks.
- 2007: In the early part of the year, Young and Natsios left Wikileaks. Cryptome published an archive of the secret, internal electronic mailing list of the Wikileaks organizers, from its inception through Young's departure from the group. On April 20 the website received notice from its hosting company, Verio, that it would be evicted on May 4 for unspecified breaches of their acceptable use policy. Cryptome alleged that the shutdown is a censorship attempt in response to posts about the Coast Guard's Deepwater program.
- 2010: Cryptome's Earthlink account was compromised, leading to its website being hacked and Cryptome's data copied. In February, Cryptome is briefly shut down by Network Solutions for alleged DMCA violations after it posted a "Microsoft legal spy manual". Microsoft withdraws the complaint 3 days later and the website is restored. In March, PayPal stopped processing donations to Cryptome and froze the account due to "suspicious activities". The account was restored after an "investigation" by PayPal.
- 2011: In July, Cryptome named the alleged CIA analyst who found Osama bin Laden. On August 31, Cryptome downloaded and decrypted the Cablegate files. On September 1 Cryptome published the unredacted United States diplomatic cables leak a day before Wikileaks. In September, Cryptome published a list of Intelligence and National Security Alliance members, alleging that they were spies.
- 2012: In February, the Cryptome website was hacked to infect visitors with malware.
- 2013: In February, Cryptome's website, email and Twitter account were compromised, exposing whistleblowers and sources that had corresponded with Cryptome via email. Cryptome blamed hackers Ruxpin and Sabu, who was an FBI informant at the time. In June two US Secret Service agents visited Cryptome to request removal of a former presidential Bush family email allegedly hacked by Guccifer. In August, a complaint about Cryptome's identification of alleged Japanese terrorists led Network Solutions to briefly shut down the site. In October Cryptome informed its users that Network Solutions had generated logs of site's visitors, and that requests to delete the logs were not being honored. (According to Network Solutions's website, logs are deleted after thirty days and Cryptome could choose to prevent the logging.)
- 2014: Cryptome attempted to raise $100,000 to fund the website and its other disclosure initiatives. In June, Cryptome was pulled offline again when malware was found infecting visitors to the site. In July, Cryptome said it would publish the remaining NSA documents taken by Edward Snowden in the "coming weeks".
- 2015: In September, Cryptome announced that their encryption keys are compromised. A few days later, Cryptome filed for incorporation in New York. Later that month, a GCHQ document leaked by Edward Snowden revealed that the agency is monitoring visits to Cryptome. In October, a sold edition (USB stick) of the Cryptome archive was observed to contain web server logs, containing clues to the identities of Cryptome visitors. The logs had been mailed out to users who ordered the site's archive at least since 2007. Cryptome posted pictures of logs dating back to the site's creation, claiming that Cryptome is for sale. Cryptome later claimed that the sale is a parody and that "Cryptome has no logs, never has", noting that their "various ISPs have copious logs of many kinds" along with metadata and that Cryptome tracks these "to see what happens to our files".
- 2016: In April, Cryptome published thousands of credit-card numbers, passwords and personal information allegedly belonging to Qatar National Bank's clients. In July, Cryptome alleged LinkNYC was "tracking Cryptome's movements through the city" after the company responded to Cryptome's social media posts by attempting to prevent them from photographing the company's installations.
- 2020: In September, Cryptome testified that they published the unredacted cables before WikiLeaks, and were never contacted by law enforcement or instructed to remove them.
- 2022 In December, John Young wrote to the U.S. Justice Department saying that because he published the same leaked government documents at the centre of the U.S. case against Julian Assange, he should be indicted for violating the Espionage Act and a co-defendant at Assange's trial.
- 2023 In January, Cryptome said that Twitter, Inc. suspended permanently the @Cryptome_org Twitter account, citing no reason. In August, Cryptome announced that the site would be closed until Julian Assange is freed.

=== Relationship to WikiLeaks ===
In the 1990s, John Young and Julian Assange were in regular contact on the Cypherpunks mailing list. In late 2006, John Young joined WikiLeaks' advisory board before its public launch. Young also acted as its public face by first registering the WikiLeaks domain. Young revealed that he was approached by Julian Assange and asked to be the public face of Wikileaks; Young agreed and his name was listed on the website's original domain registration form.

In early 2007, Young and Natsios left Wikileaks due to concerns about the organizations' finances and fundraising, accusing it of being a "money-making operation" and "business intelligence" scheme, and expressing concern that the amount of money they sought "could not be needed so soon except for suspect purposes." On January 7, 2007, he emailed the internal mailing list accusing WikiLeaks of "disinformation campaign against legitimate dissent" and "working for the enemy." 150 pages of emails were published on Cryptome, and Young publicly criticized the group for their lack of security, their showmanship, and their "dramatic, rigged, press shindigs." In 2008, Young changed his opinion of WikiLeaks and became supportive of them again, but still had reservations about their "self-promotional aspect, and its secrecy, its love of authoritativeness."

In a 2010 interview with CNET.com John Young accused the organisation of a lack of transparency regarding its fundraising and financial management. He stated his belief that WikiLeaks could not guarantee whistleblowers the anonymity or confidentiality they claimed and that he "would not trust them with information if it had any value, or if it put me at risk or anyone that I cared about at risk." Cryptome ended on bad terms with Wikileaks, with Young directly accusing them of selling classified material and calling them "a criminal organization". In a separate interview, he called Assange a narcissist and compared him to Henry Kissinger. Young also accused George Soros and the Koch brothers of "backing Wikileaks generously".

In October 2015, WikiLeaks made a searchable archive of Cryptome.

In September 2020, Cryptome testified that they published the unredacted diplomatic cables before WikiLeaks, and were never contacted by law enforcement or instructed to remove them. In December 2022, John Young wrote to the U.S. Justice Department saying that, because he published the same leaked government documents at the centre of the U.S. case against Julian Assange, he should be indicted for violating the Espionage Act and a co-defendant at Assange's trial. In August 2023, Cryptome announced that the site would be closed until Julian Assange is freed.

== Reception ==
A 2004 The New York Times article assessed Cryptome with the headline, "Advise the Public, Tip Off the Terrorists" in its coverage of the site's gas pipeline maps. Reader's Digest made an even more alarming assessment of the site in 2005, calling it an "invitation to terrorists" and alleging that Young "may well have put lives at risk".

A 2007 Wired article criticized Cryptome for going "overboard". The Village Voice featured Cryptome in its 2008 Best of NYC feature, citing its hosting of "photos, facts, and figures" of the Iraq War.

WikiLeaks accused Cryptome of executing a "smear campaign" in 2010 after Cryptome posted what it said were email exchanges with WikiLeaks insiders, which WikiLeaks disputed.

Cryptome was awarded the Defensor Libertatis (defender of liberty) award at the 2010 Big Brother Awards, for a "life in the fight against surveillance and censorship" and for providing "suppressed or otherwise censored documents to the global public". The awards committee noted that Cryptome had engaged with "every protagonist of the military-electronic monitoring complex".

In 2012, Steven Aftergood, the director of the Federation of American Scientists Project on Government Secrecy, described Young and Cryptome as "fearless and contemptuous of any pretensions to authority" and "oblivious to the security concerns that are the preconditions of a working democracy. And he seems indifferent to the human costs of involuntary disclosure of personal information." Aftergood specifically criticized Cryptome's handling of the McGurk emails, saying "it's fine to oppose McGurk or anyone else. It wasn't necessary to humiliate them".

In 2013, Cindy Cohn, then the legal director of the Electronic Frontier Foundation, praised Cryptome as "a really important safety valve for the rest of us, as to what our government is up to."

In 2014, Glenn Greenwald praised and criticized Cryptome, saying "There is an obvious irony to complaining that we're profiting from our work while [Cryptome] tries to raise $100,000 by featuring our work. Even though [Cryptome] occasionally does some repellent and demented things—such as posting the home addresses of Laura Poitras, Bart Gellman, and myself along with maps pointing to our homes—[they also do] things that are quite productive and valuable. On the whole, I'm glad there is a Cryptome and hope they succeed in raising the money they want."

Giganews criticized Cryptome for posting unverified allegations which Giganews described as completely false and without evidence. Giganews went on to question Cryptome's credibility and motives, saying "Cryptome's failure to contact us to validate the allegations or respond to our concerns has lessened their credibility. It does not seem that Cryptome is in search for the truth, which leaves us to question what are their true motives."

Peter Earnest, a 36-year veteran of the CIA turned executive director of the International Spy Museum and chairman of the board of directors of the Association for Intelligence Officers criticized Cryptome for publishing the names of spies, saying it does considerable damage and aids people that would do them harm.

== See also ==
- Cryptome quotes
- Cypherpunks
- Distributed Denial of Secrets
- Espionage
- Open government
- The Black Vault
- WikiLeaks
