= Pentagon UFO videos =

US fighter jet display videos

"FLIR" video, Nov 2004, recorded by Lt. Commander Chad Underwood of the USS Nimitz off the coast of southern California

"GIMBAL" video, Jan 20 2015, recorded by crew of the USS Theodore Roosevelt off the US east coast

"GOFAST" video, Feb or March 2015, recorded by crew of the USS Theodore Roosevelt off the US east coast

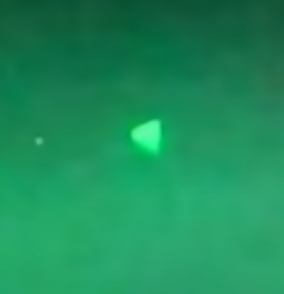
Still from the USS Russell video

Middle East UAP, 2022

South Asia, 2023, identified by a commuter aircraft.

South Asia 2, 2023, additional footage, identified as a commuter aircraft. The apparent back and forth motion is an artifact of the longer focal length and the sensor attempting to zoom in on the fast moving aircraft.

Western USA 2021, identified as commercial aircraft by AARO.

Animation of the parallax effect, where a moving observer perceives differences in velocity between objects at varying distances. An object in the sky directly above the nearest buildings, but mistakenly thought to be above the furthest ones, would be perceived as moving rapidly.

4 UAP Formation recorded over water in Iran, the video was released on 22 May 2026

The Pentagon UFO videos are selected visual recordings of forward-looking infrared (FLIR) targeting cameras from United States Navy fighter jets based aboard the aircraft carriers USS Nimitz and USS Theodore Roosevelt in 2004, 2014 and 2015, with additional footage taken by other Navy personnel in 2019. The four Infrared videos taken from aircraft's targeting pod have been widely characterized as officially documenting UFOs and received extensive coverage in the media since 2017. The Pentagon later addressed and officially released the first three videos of unidentified aerial phenomena (UAP) in 2020, and confirmed the provenance of the leaked 2019 videos in two statements made in 2021. Footage of UAPs was also released in 2023, sourced from MQ-9 military drones.

Publicity surrounding the videos has prompted a number of explanations, including drones or unidentified terrestrial aircraft, anomalous or artifactual instrument readings, physical observational phenomena (e.g., parallax), human observational and interpretive error, and, as is typical in the context of such incidents, extraordinary speculations of alien spacecraft.

== Background ==
=== 2004 USS Nimitz incident ("Tic Tac") ===
On 14 November 2004, Commander David Fravor of the USS Nimitz Carrier Strike Group piloting a Boeing F/A-18E/F Super Hornet investigated radar indications of a possible target off the coast of southern California. Fravor said the operator had told him that the USS Princeton (CG-59), part of the strike group, had been tracking unusual aircraft for two weeks prior to the incident. The aircraft would appear at 80,000 feet (24,000 m) before descending rapidly toward the sea, stopping at 20,000 feet (6,100 m) and hovering. Fravor reported that he saw an object, white and oval, hovering above an ocean disturbance. He estimated that the object was about 40 feet (12 m) long. Fravor and another pilot, Alex Dietrich, said in an interview that a total of four people (two pilots and two weapons systems officers in the back seats of the two airplanes) witnessed the object for about 5 minutes. Fravor says that as he spiraled down to get closer to the object, the object ascended, mirroring the trajectory of his airplane, until the object disappeared. A second wave of fighters, which included weapons systems officer Lieutenant Commander Chad Underwood, took off from Nimitz to investigate. Unlike Fravor, Underwood's fighter was equipped with an advanced infrared camera (FLIR). Underwood recorded the FLIR video, and coined the description "Tic Tac" to describe the infrared image; Underwood later explained that the term was partially inspired by a joke in the 1980 comedy Airplane!. Underwood did not observe the object with his own eyes, saying:

"I was more concerned with tracking it, making sure that the videotape was on so that I could bring something back to the ship, so that the intel folks could dissect whatever it is that I captured."

Additional Navy personnel aboard the USS Princeton and USS Nimitz later corroborated aspects of the encounter, including radar and combat-systems technicians who said the strike group's AN/SPY-1B radar and AEGIS Combat System had tracked similar unidentified contacts for about a week before the intercept, and a data technician who secured recordings from the E-2 Hawkeye aircraft involved.

External videos
- Interview with Alex Dietrich from the American Veterans Center

=== 2014–2015 USS Theodore Roosevelt incidents (GIMBAL and GOFAST) ===
During 2014–2015, fighter pilots associated with the USS Theodore Roosevelt carrier strike group — including Lieutenant Ryan Graves — were operating off the East Coast of the United States when they recorded the GIMBAL and GOFAST videos while reporting instrument detections of unknown aerial objects which the pilots were unable to identify.

== Release of videos ==
On 16 December 2017, The New York Times reported on the incidents, and published two videos, termed "FLIR" and "GIMBAL", purporting to show encounters by jets from Nimitz and Theodore Roosevelt with unusually shaped, fast-moving aircraft. Additionally, the Washington Post published a video of a similar encounter, titled "GOFAST". The reports became subject to "fevered speculation by UFO investigators". Those stories have been criticized by journalism professor Keith Kloor as "a curious narrative that appears to be driven by thinly-sourced and slanted reporting". According to Kloor, "Cursory attention has been given to the most likely, prosaic explanations. Instead, the coverage has, for the most part, taken a quizzical, mysterious frame that plays off the catchy 'UFO' tag in the headline".

The videos, featuring cockpit display data and infrared imagery, along with audio of communications between the pursuing pilots, were initially provided to the press by Christopher Mellon, the former Deputy Assistant Secretary of Defense for Intelligence. Around the same time, Luis Elizondo, the director of the Advanced Aerospace Threat Identification Program, had resigned from the Pentagon in October 2017 to protest government secrecy and opposition to the investigation, stating in a resignation letter to Defense Secretary James Mattis that the program was not being taken seriously. According to Wired magazine, a copy of one of the videos had been online, in a UFO forum, since at least 2007.

In September 2019, Susan Gough, a Pentagon spokeswoman, confirmed that the released videos were made by naval aviators, and that they are "part of a larger issue of an increased number of training range incursions by unidentified aerial phenomena in recent years". On 27 April 2020, the Pentagon formally released the three videos. In February 2020, the United States Navy confirmed that, in response to inquiries, intelligence briefings presented by naval intelligence officials have been provided to members of Congress.

=== 2021 release ===
In April 2021, Pentagon spokesperson Sue Gough confirmed that publicly-available video footage of what appeared to be an unidentified triangular object in the sky had been taken by Navy personnel aboard USS Russell in 2019. Science writer and skeptical investigator Mick West suggested the image was the result of an optical effect called a bokeh, which can make out of focus light sources appear triangular or pyramidal due to the shape of the aperture of some camera lenses. The Pentagon also confirmed photographs of objects described as "sphere", "acorn" and "metallic blimp".

The following month, Gough further confirmed a second video had been recorded by Navy personnel and is under review by the UAP Task Force. The video, recorded on 15 July 2019, aboard the USS Omaha, purportedly shows a spherical object flying over the ocean as seen through an infrared camera at night, moving rapidly across the screen before stopping and easing down into the water. West also commented on the video, stating that "What we’ve got to go with here is the simplest explanation and really the simplest explanation is that it’s just a plane. It moves like a plane, it acts like a plane".

=== 2023 release ===
In early 2023 the propulsion trail of an object was filmed by two MQ-9 drones in South Asia that initially Sean M. Kirkpatrick, director of the Pentagon’s All-domain Anomaly Resolution Office (AARO), believed to be "truly anomalous", after AARO analysis, Kirkpatrick instead described the trail as a "shadow image"; the propulsion heat signature which, when viewed in infrared, was apparent as only a commuter aircraft.

On 31 May 2023, Kirkpatrick shared an infrared video in a public meeting of NASA's UAP independent study team recorded in the western United States in 2021 in which full analysis, combined with commercial flight data in the region, led the Pentagon's AARO to conclude that they were commercial aircraft.

On 19 April 2023, the Pentagon released another video featuring MQ-9 drone footage from the Middle East depicting an unidentified aerial phenomenon. Kirkpatrick briefed a Senate Armed Services subcommittee that it resembled a small "metallic orb". However Kirkpatrick said they are unable to fully identify anything from this video. He told ABC News that no explanation could be made of the object from the video, due to a lack of data. Some skeptic ufologists have pointed out that said aerial phenomenon might be just a balloon.

== Potential explanations ==
As of 2020, the aerial phenomena recorded from the Nimitz and Roosevelt events were characterized by the Department of Defense as "unidentified".

Widespread media attention to these events has motivated theories and speculations from private individuals and groups about the underlying explanation(s), including those focused upon pseudoscientific topics such as ufology. Regarding the pseudoscientific explanations, writer Matthew Gault stated that these events "reflect the same pattern that's played out dozens of times before. Someone sees something strange in the sky ... and the public jumps to an illogical conclusion".

Mundane, skeptical explanations include instrument or software malfunction, anomaly or artifact, human observational illusion (e.g., parallax) or interpretive error, or common aircraft (e.g., a passenger airliner) or aerial device (e.g., weather balloon). In the context of his continued efforts to debunk UFO material Mick West argued, "Any time something unidentified shows up in restricted airspace, then that's a real problem", but cautioned that believers in "alien disclosure" are "encroaching on these real issues of UAPs". West cautioned that "the report suggests the majority of cases, if solved, would turn out to be a variety of things like airborne clutter or natural atmospheric phenomenon. A lack of data does not mean aliens are the likely answer". He stated that the recorded UFOs might well be commercial airplanes or balloons, distorted by the infrared glare.

Writing in The New York Times, author and astrophysicist Adam Frank stated that with respect to claims of "evidence of extraterrestrial technology that can defy the laws of physics", the pilot's reports and cockpit instrumentation videos "doesn't amount to much". Frank speculated that it was possible the UFOs in the videos are "drones deployed by rivals like Russia and China to examine our defenses — luring our pilots into turning on their radar and other detectors, thus revealing our electronic intelligence capabilities". Astronomer Thomas Bania speculated that they could be some form of electronic warfare fielded by China or Russia "trying to get intelligence of exactly what our weapons systems are capable of doing".

Following the congressional intelligence briefings and in order to encourage pilots to flag disturbances that "have been occurring regularly since 2014", the US Navy announced it had updated the way pilots were to formally report unexplained aerial observations. Commenting on these updated guidelines, a spokesman for the deputy Chief of Naval Operations said, "The intent of the message to the fleet is to provide updated guidance on reporting procedures for suspected intrusions into our airspace". Regarding the new guidelines, the spokesman said that one possible explanation for the increase in reported intrusions could be the rise in availability of unmanned aerial systems such as quadrocopters.

United States Senator Marco Rubio, who was chairman of the Senate Intelligence Committee at the time, said that he feared the UFOs in the videos may be Chinese or Russian technology. Retired Admiral Gary Roughead, who commanded both the Atlantic and Pacific Fleets before serving as Chief of Naval Operations from 2007 to 2011, said in 2020 that in his time, "most of the assessments were inconclusive" as to what these videos showed. In the context of a lecture on China's 21st century military strategy, Roughead commented that development of unmanned autonomous aircraft that had the capability to be used as submersible military assets was a priority of the US, as well as other nations such as China and Russia.

Adam Dodd and security expert Jack Weinstein say that neither of these countries presently have the capability to produce aircraft with such extraordinary capabilities, and noted that they would normally keep any such high level technology from being observed and documented by a rival country such as the US.

Media commentary has also noted that, if China or Russia had the level of technology that allowed for extreme speeds and maneuverability exhibited by the UAPs, then the US would be aware of it. However, in response to this, Weinstein said, "I won't go that far. China has developed some good technology much faster than we thought they were going to".

According to New York magazine writer for the Digital Intelligencer, Jeff Wise, UAP may not represent actual aircraft speeds and maneuverability, since advancements in electronic warfare (EW) techniques, similar to early "radar spoofing" used by the US military, could deceive sensors to give false velocity and position information and result in reports of "unusual UAP movement patterns or flight characteristics". Wise writes that this might be "the crucial, missing context for what military pilots might actually be seeing" and speculates that US adversaries may have developed EW capabilities that exploit weaknesses of US systems and "gaps in its electronic warfare capabilities" that allow sensor information to be missed, or erroneous tracking data to be created.

In 2023, David Fravor, the pilot who reported the USS Nimitz sighting from the FLIR video, gave testimony under oath regarding the incident in a United States House Committee on Oversight and Accountability hearing. During the hearing, Fravor's account included that advanced radar aboard the USS Princeton had detected what operators described as "multiple anomalous aerial vehicles" descending 80,000 feet in less than a second, prompting him and fellow pilot Alex Dietrich to investigate. Alongside him was fellow former fighter pilot Ryan Graves, and former intelligence officer David Grusch. Fravor repeated his claims that, in his opinion, "the technology that we faced was far superior than anything that we had."

== June 2021 UFO report ==
On 25 June 2021, the US Office of the Director of National Intelligence (ODNI) released a preliminary report on UAPs, largely centering on evidence gathered in the last 20 years from US Navy reports. The report came to no conclusion about what the UAPs were, based on a "lack [of] sufficient data to determine the nature of mysterious flying objects observed by military pilots — including whether they are advanced earthly technologies, atmospherics, or of an extraterrestrial nature", though in a limited number of incidents, UAP reportedly appeared to exhibit unusual flight characteristics, including high velocity, breaking the sound barrier without producing a sonic boom, high maneuverability not able to be replicated otherwise, long-duration flight, and an ability to submerge into the water. Some of the UAPs appeared to move with no discernible means of propulsion, and it was noted that the alleged high speeds and maneuvers would normally destroy any craft. These observations could be the result of sensor errors, spoofing, or observer misperception, and require additional rigorous analysis.

The report indicated that, in most cases, the UAP recordings probably were of physical objects, and not false readings, as individual instances had been detected by different sensor mechanisms, including visual observation. The report also stated that "UAP probably lack a single explanation", and proposed five possible categories of explanation: airborne clutter, natural atmospheric phenomena, US government or industry development technology, foreign craft, and an "Other" category.

The report raised concerns that the UAPs could be a safety issue, with regard to a possible collision with US aircraft, and that they could pose a security threat if they were foreign craft gathering information about the US. The report indicated that investigation of the topic would continue, including development of reporting protocols. The report also indicated that, of the sightings reported, all except one (confirmed as a weather balloon) lack sufficient information to attribute a specific explanation or explanations.

== FOI request by The Black Vault ==
The Black Vault, a government transparency site that had previously released UAP material, made a Freedom of Information request of the Government for the release of more video footage, filed to the US Navy in April 2020. Some two years later, the government confirmed it had more footage, but refused to release it, citing concerns for national security. Deputy director of the Department of the Navy's Freedom of Information Act (FOIA) program Gregory Cason stated in the response: "The release of this information will harm national security as it may provide adversaries valuable information regarding Department of Defense/Navy operations, vulnerabilities, and/or capabilities."

== 2026 United States UAP declassification initiative ==
In February 2026, President Donald Trump issued a directive ordering federal agencies, including the Department of Defense, NASA, the FBI, and elements of the intelligence community, to identify and prepare records related to unidentified anomalous phenomena (UAP) and potential extraterrestrial-related material for public release, initiating a coordinated declassification process rather than an immediate disclosure of all files.

On 8 May 2026, this process resulted in publication of approximately 162 declassified UAP records as part of a multi-agency release involving the Department of Defense and other federal entities. The documents consist of a range of materials including military incident reports, intelligence files, eyewitness accounts, photographs, videos, and archival records spanning multiple decades. Officials described the records as cases that remain unresolved due to the inability to reach definitive conclusions based on available information. The release was presented as part of an effort to increase transparency and allow public review of the material, while officials stated that the documents do not contain confirmed evidence of extraterrestrial life or technology.

== In popular culture ==
The videos were featured in the 2019 History Channel series Unidentified: Inside America's UFO Investigation. On 5 October 2019, episode 1361 of The Joe Rogan Experience featured the videos and interviewed Fravor.

== See also ==
- Advanced Aerospace Threat Identification Program (AATIP) – U.S. program to study UFOs (2007–2012)
- All-domain Anomaly Resolution Office (AARO) – Task force of the US Department of Defense
- Navy UFO patents
- The Phenomenon (2020 film)
- Unidentified Aerial Phenomena Task Force (UAPTF) – Task force of the US Department of Defense
- United States UFO files – U.S. government documents declassified in 2026
