= USS Nimitz =

US Navy Nimitz-class aircraft carrier

USS Nimitz (CVN-68)
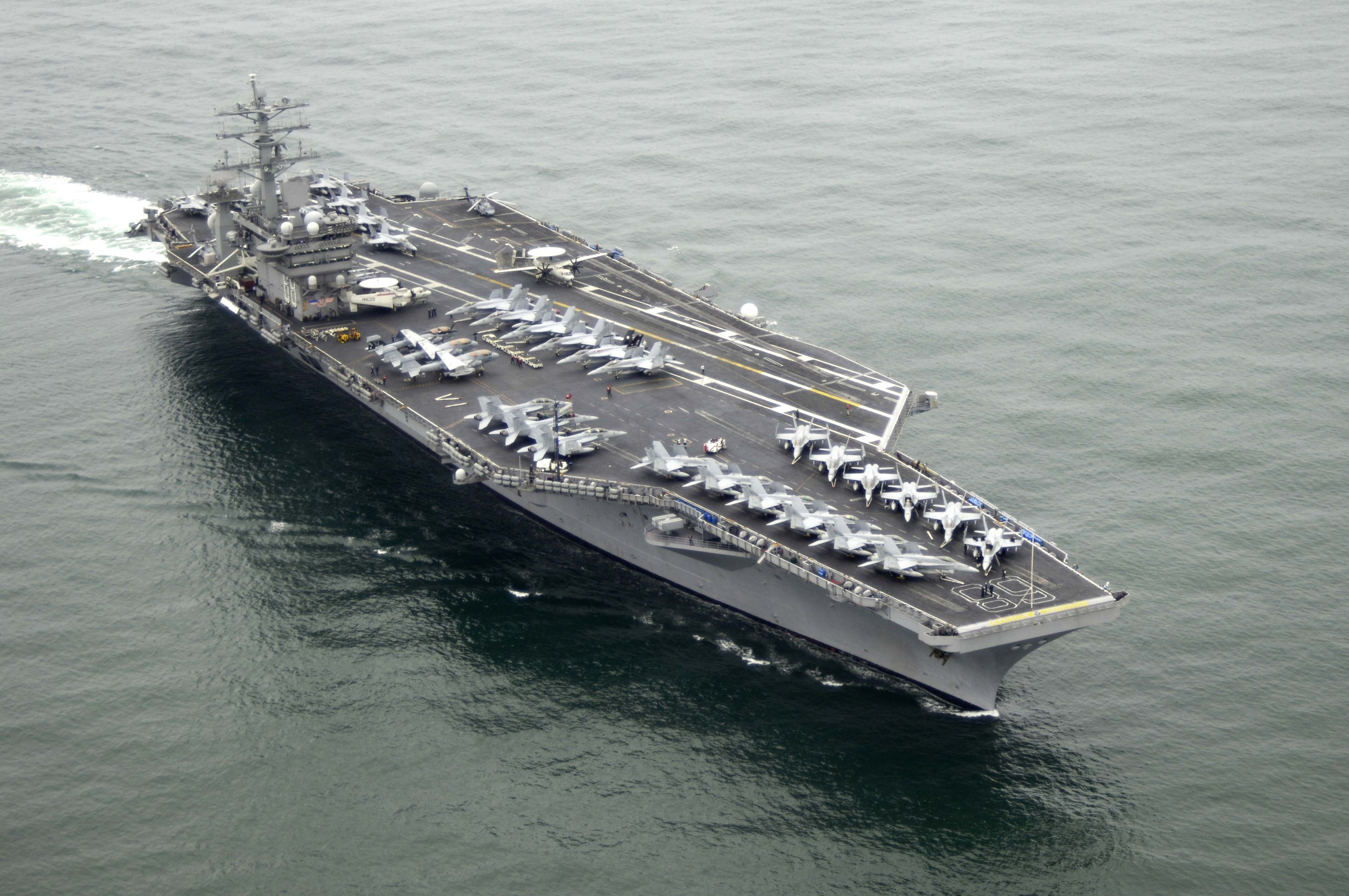
- USS Nimitz (CVN-68)

History

United States
- Name: Nimitz
- Namesake: Chester W. Nimitz
- Ordered: 31 March 1967
- Builder: Newport News Shipbuilding
- Laid down: 22 June 1968
- Launched: 13 May 1972
- Acquired: 11 April 1975
- Commissioned: 3 May 1975
- Reclassified: CVN-68, 30 June 1975
- Home port: Naval Station Norfolk
- Identification: MMSI number: 303981000; Callsign: NMTZ; Hull number: CVN-68
- Motto: Teamwork, a Tradition
- Nickname(s): Old Salt; Uncle Chester
- Status: in active service
- Badge

General characteristics
- Class & type: Nimitz-class aircraft carrier
- Displacement: 100,020 long tons (112,020 short tons)
- Length: Overall: 1,092 ft (332.8 m); Waterline: 1,040 ft (317.0 m)
- Beam: Overall: 252 ft (76.8 m); Waterline: 134 ft (40.8 m)
- Draft: Maximum navigational: 37 ft (11.3 m); Limit: 41 ft (12.5 m)
- Propulsion: 2 × Westinghouse A4W nuclear reactors (HEU 93.5%); 4 × steam turbines; 4 × shafts; 260,000 shp (190 MW)
- Speed: 31.5 knots (58.3 km/h; 36.2 mph)
- Range: Unlimited distance; 20–25 years
- Complement: Ship's company: 3,532; Air wing: 2,480
- Sensors & processing systems: AN/SPS-48E 3-D air search radar; AN/SPS-49(V)5 2-D air search radar; AN/SPQ-9B target acquisition radar; AN/SPN-46 air traffic control radars; AN/SPN-43C air traffic control radar; AN/SPN-41 landing aid radars; 4 × Mk 91 NSSM guidance systems; 4 × Mk 95 radars
- Electronic warfare & decoys: AN/SLQ-32A(V)4 countermeasures suite; SLQ-25A Nixie torpedo countermeasures
- Armament: 2 × Sea Sparrow; 2 × RIM-116 Rolling Airframe Missile; 2 × PHALANX CIWS (Close-In Weapons System) Gatling guns; 4 × MK 38 25mm autocannon turrets; 10 × .50 cal turret emplacements
- Aircraft carried: 90 fixed wing and helicopters

USS Nimitz (CVN-68) is an aircraft carrier of the United States Navy, and the lead ship of her class. One of the largest warships in the world, she was laid down, launched, and commissioned as CVAN-68, "aircraft carrier, attack, nuclear powered", but she was later redesignated as CVN-68, "aircraft carrier, multi-mission, nuclear-powered", on 30 June 1975, as part of a fleet-wide realignment that year.

The ship was named after World War II Pacific fleet commander Chester W. Nimitz, USN, (1885–1966), who was the Navy's third fleet admiral. She is the only Nimitz-class carrier whose official name is just the surname of the person for whom she is named. Nimitz had her homeport at Naval Station Norfolk until 1987, when she was relocated to Naval Station Bremerton in Washington (now part of Naval Base Kitsap). Following her refueling and complex overhaul in 2001, her home port was changed to Naval Air Station North Island in San Diego County, California. The home port of Nimitz was again moved to Naval Station Everett in Washington in 2012.

In January 2015, Nimitz changed home port from Everett back to Naval Base Kitsap. With the inactivation of USS Enterprise in 2012 and decommissioning in 2017, Nimitz is now the oldest serving aircraft carrier in the world. On 10 March 2026, she began what was supposed to be her final voyage, but on 14 March 2026, the Navy extended her active service through March 2027, to maintain the 11-carrier mandate.

== Construction ==
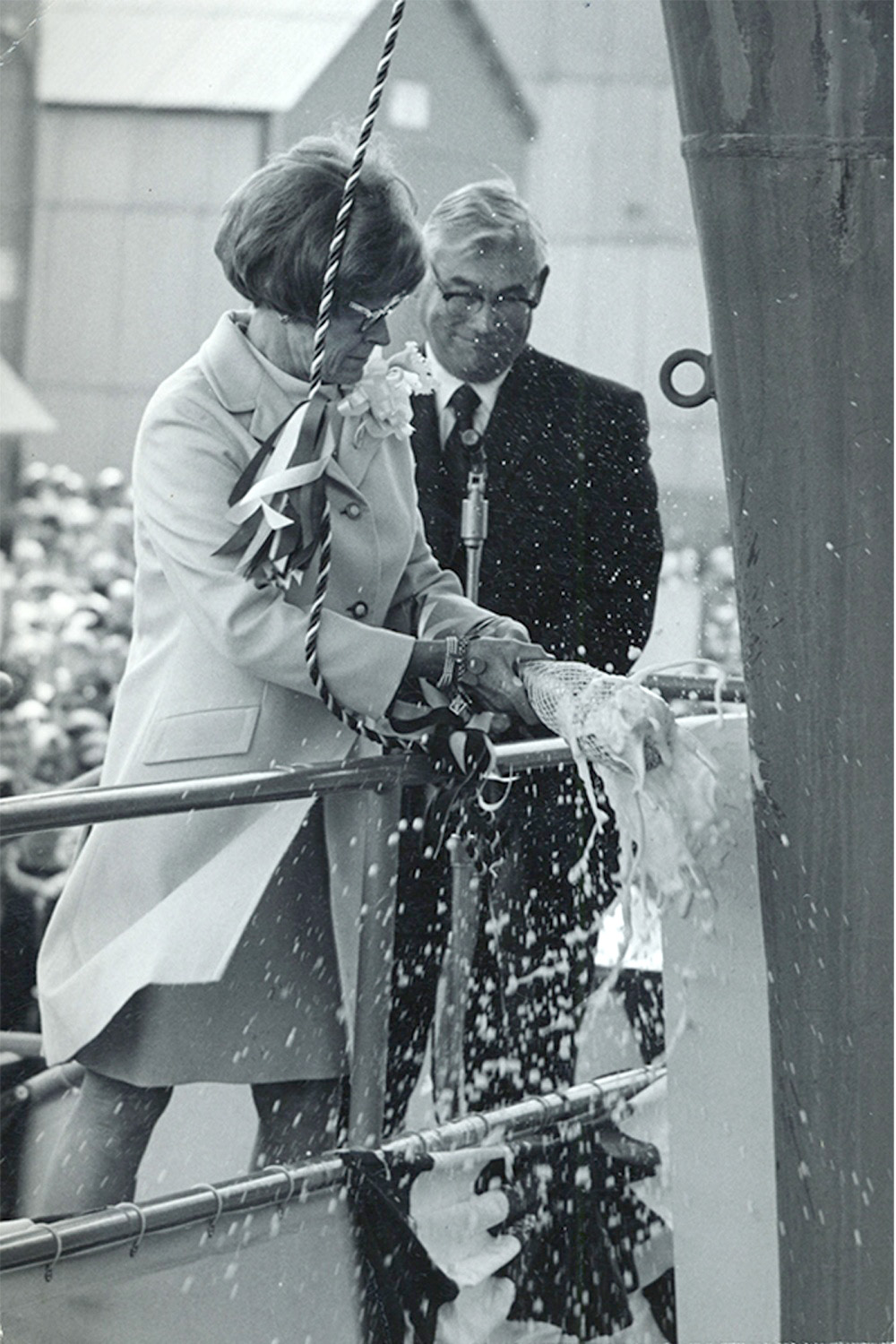
Catherine Nimitz Lay christened Nimitz on 13 May 1972.

Nimitz was authorized by the U.S. Congress in fiscal year 1967 and Newport News Shipbuilding and Dry Dock Co. in Newport News, Virginia, was awarded the $106.5 million contract (equivalent to $1028.33 million today). Her keel was laid down on 22 June 1968. The vessel was christened on 13 May 1972, by Catherine Nimitz Lay, the daughter of the late Admiral Nimitz, six years after his death. Nimitz was delivered to the Navy in 1975, and was commissioned at Naval Station Norfolk on 3 May 1975, by the 38th President of the United States, Gerald R. Ford.

== Nimitz Carrier Strike Group ==
Nimitz is part of Carrier Strike Group Eleven (CSG-11) with Carrier Air Wing Seventeen (CVW-17) embarked, with Nimitz as the flagship of the strike group and the home of the commander of Destroyer Squadron 9.

=== Ships of Destroyer Squadron 9 ===
- USS Curtis Wilbur (DDG-54)
- USS Fitzgerald (DDG-62)
- USS Gridley (DDG-101)
- USS Wayne E. Meyer (DDG-108)
- USS Lenah Sutcliffe Higbee (DDG-123)

=== Squadrons of CVW-17 ===
USS Nimitz Air Power Demonstration

- Strike Fighter Squadron 22 (VFA-22) "Fighting Redcocks" with Boeing F/A-18F Super Hornets
- Strike Fighter Squadron 94 (VFA-94) "Mighty Shrikes" with F/A-18E Super Hornets
- Strike Fighter Squadron 137 (VFA-137) "Kestrels" with F/A-18E Super Hornets
- Strike Fighter Squadron 146 (VFA-146) "Blue Diamonds" with F/A-18E Super Hornets
- Electronic Attack Squadron 139 (VAQ-139) "Cougars" with Boeing EA-18G Growlers
- Carrier Airborne Command & Control Squadron 121 (VAW-121) "Bluetails" with Northrop Grumman E-2D Advanced Hawkeyes
- Helicopter Sea Combat Squadron 6 (HSC-6) "Screaming Indians" with Sikorsky MH-60S Seahawks
- Helicopter Maritime Strike Squadron 73 (HSM-73) "Battle Cats" with MH-60R Seahawks
- Fleet Logistics Support Squadron 40 Detachment 3 (VRC-40) "Rawhides" with Grumman C-2 Greyhound

== Service history ==
=== 1970s ===
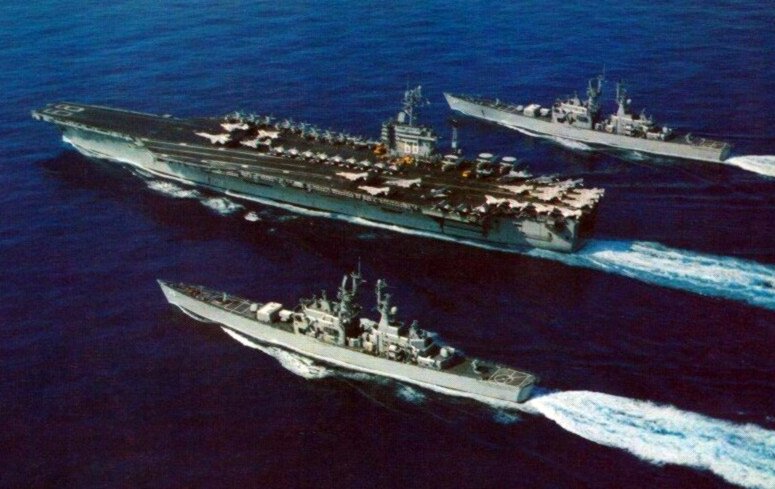
Nimitz on her first deployment in 1976 alongside nuclear-powered cruisers California and South Carolina

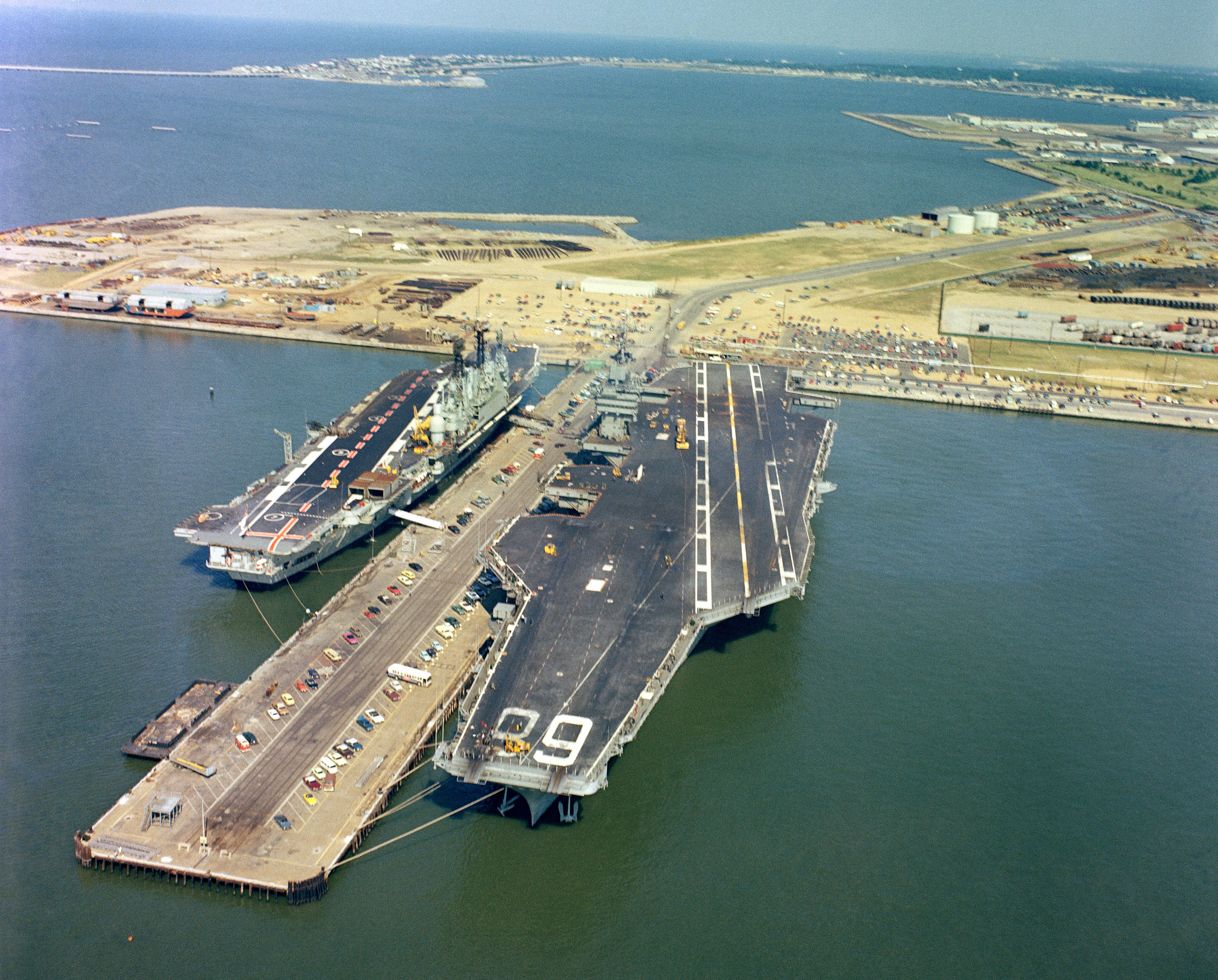
Nimitz (right) alongside HMS Ark Royal at Norfolk Naval Station in August 1978

USS Nimitz first deployed to the Mediterranean Sea on 7 July 1976, with Carrier Air Wing 8 embarked in company with the nuclear-powered cruisers USS South Carolina and USS California. In November 1976, Nimitz was awarded the Battle "E" from Commander, Naval Air Force U.S. Atlantic Fleet, for being the most efficient and foremost aircraft carrier in the Atlantic Fleet. The cruise was uneventful, and the carrier returned to Norfolk, Virginia, on 7 February 1977.

A second uneventful Mediterranean cruise was conducted from 1 December 1977 to 20 July 1978. The third deployment began on 10 September 1979, to the Mediterranean. The ship moved to the Indian Ocean in response to the Iran hostage crisis in which the U.S. Embassy in Tehran, Iran, was overtaken and 52 hostages were held. Prior to this trip, the ship took part in the shooting of the 1980 film The Final Countdown, whose story was specifically set aboard the Nimitz. After four months on station, Operation Evening Light was launched from Nimitz's decks in an attempt to rescue the U.S. Embassy staff. The mission was aborted after a helicopter crashed at a refueling point in the Iranian desert. The ship returned home 26 May 1980, having spent 144 days at sea.

=== 1980s ===
On 26 May 1981, a Marine Corps EA-6B Prowler from Marine Tactical Electronic Warfare Squadron 2 (VMAQ-2) assigned to Carrier Air Wing 8 (CVW-8) crashed on the flight deck, killing 14 crewmen and injuring 45 others. The Prowler was fuel-critical after a "bolter" (missed approach), and its crash and the subsequent fire and explosions destroyed or damaged 19 other aircraft. Autopsies showed later that the pilot had had six times the normal level of the sedating antihistamine medication brompheniramine in his blood. Despite having no connection to the accident, the media focused on the autopsy results of several members of the Nimitz's enlisted flight deck crew who were killed and who tested positive for marijuana. An article by Robert Reinhold in the 17 June 1981 edition of The New York Times reported, "Experts at the National Institute on Drug Abuse say that it would probably be impossible to establish conclusively that any of the Nimitz crew had been smoking marijuana on the night of the crash because the test does not directly detect the component of marijuana smoke that acts on the brain. Because the metabolites may persist in the blood for many days, the test may detect marijuana that was used many days earlier, long after the effects have worn off". As a result, President Ronald Reagan instituted a "Zero Tolerance" drug policy across all of the U.S. armed services, which started the mandatory drug testing of all U.S. military personnel.

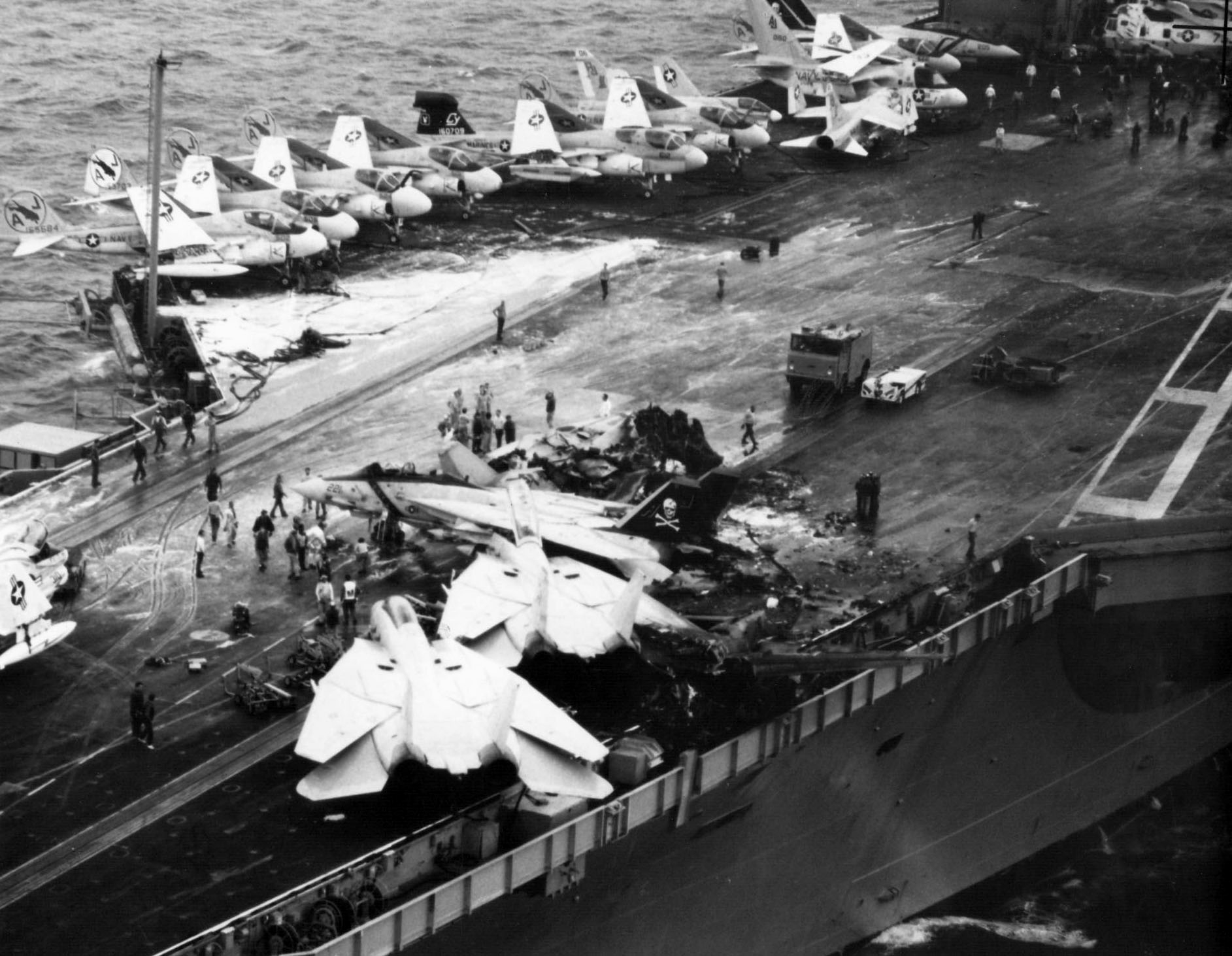
Wreck of an EA-6B Prowler after it crashed during a night landing, 1981

Nimitz deployed again to the Mediterranean on 3 August 1981. The ship, in company with USS Forrestal, conducted a Freedom of Navigation exercise in international waters in the Gulf of Sidra near Libya on 18 and 19 August 1981. On the morning of 19 August 1981, two Grumman F-14 Tomcats of VF-41 were engaged by two Libyan Su-22s, resulting in the two Libyan aircraft being shot down in what became known as the Gulf of Sidra incident.

Nimitz's fourth deployment, from 10 November 1982 to 20 May 1983, was to the Caribbean Sea and the Mediterranean Sea. Nimitz deployed for a fifth time on 8 March 1985. On 14 June 1985, two Lebanese gunmen hijacked TWA Flight 847, which carried 153 passengers and crew and included Americans. In response, Nimitz was deployed to the coast of Lebanon, where the ship remained until August 1985. The ship returned to Norfolk on 4 October 1985.

Nimitz, again with CVW-8 embarked, departed Norfolk for the sixth and final Mediterranean deployment on 30 December 1986. After four months and numerous Mediterranean port visits, the carrier crossed the equator en route to Rio de Janeiro. From Rio de Janeiro, she proceeded south around Cape Horn and into the Pacific Ocean. After a brief stop in San Diego, to offload the East Coast air wing, Nimitz arrived at her new home port of Bremerton, Washington, on 2 July 1987.

Nimitz deployed to the Western Pacific with Carrier Air Wing 9 embarked on 2 September 1988. During the 1988 Olympic Games in Seoul, Nimitz provided security off the coast of South Korea, then in October, operated in the North Arabian Sea, participating in Operation Earnest Will, the protection of reflagged Kuwaiti tankers. On 30 November 1988, while in the Arabian Sea, a 20 mm cannon accidentally fired during maintenance, striking a KA-6 Intruder. The ensuing fire spread to six other aircraft, and two sailors were killed. Nimitz returned to Bremerton on 2 March 1989.

=== 1990s ===
On 25 February 1991, Nimitz departed Bremerton for the Persian Gulf in relief of USS Ranger in the aftermath of Operation Desert Storm, returning to Bremerton on 24 August 1991. Nimitz again deployed to the Persian Gulf on 1 February 1993, in support of Operation Southern Watch, returning on 1 August 1993.

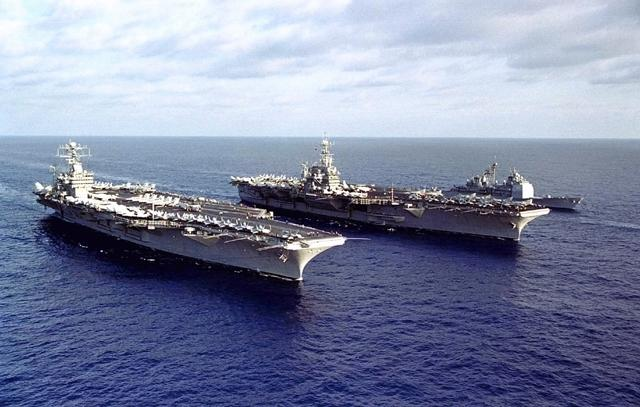
Nimitz (left) cruising with Independence and Port Royal in the Sea of Japan in September 1997

On 27 November 1995, Nimitz deployed to the Western Pacific, Indian Ocean, and Persian Gulf with Carrier Air Wing Nine (CVW-9). In March 1996, the ship patrolled the waters off Taiwan amid missile tests conducted by the Chinese in the area, becoming the first American warship to pass through the Taiwan Strait since 1976. Nimitz also cruised the Persian Gulf in support of Southern Watch prior to returning from deployment on 20 May 1996.

Between 14 and 24 July 1997, Nimitz participated in Joint Task Force Exercise 97-2 (JTFEX 97–2) off the coast of Southern California, which also served as a "Revolution in Strike Warfare" demonstration. The latter event was designed to demonstrate the capability of an aircraft carrier and an embarked air wing to project carrier-based airpower into littoral warfare. On 20 July 1997, Nimitz and CVW-9 began a high-intensity strike campaign. When flight operations were completed four days later, Nimitz and CVW-9 had carried out 771 strike sorties while dropping 1,337 bombs on target. CVW-9 flew 975 fixed-wing sorties during this four-day surge operation. Almost 80% of the sorties flown were strike sorties, with strike support accounting for another 10%. F/A-18 Hornet strike fighters flew nearly 80% of the strike sorties. Of the 771 strike sorties, 727 were loaded with ordnance, while 44 were electronic support by EA-6B Prowlers. During this four-day period, only a portion of the medium-range interdiction strikes required tanking support. KC-135 and KC-130 tanker aircraft provided most of this support. S-3 Vikings conducted recovery tanking and supplied more than one-third of the fuel passed to CVW-9 aircraft during this surge operation. This surge had been preceded by a 16-hour preparation after undergoing four days that had generated about 700 fixed-winged sorties. A following study by the Center for Naval Analyses determined that Nimitz and CVW-9 could have maintained this high-sortie operational tempo for another 12 to 24 hours before requiring equipment maintenance, with rest for the crews while ordnance and aviation fuel stocks were replenished.

On 1 September 1997, Nimitz began an around-the-world cruise, again supporting Southern Watch, which ended in Newport News, Virginia, on 2 March 1998. She spent the next three years undergoing a nuclear refueling and complex overhaul that ended on 25 June 2001.

=== 2000s ===
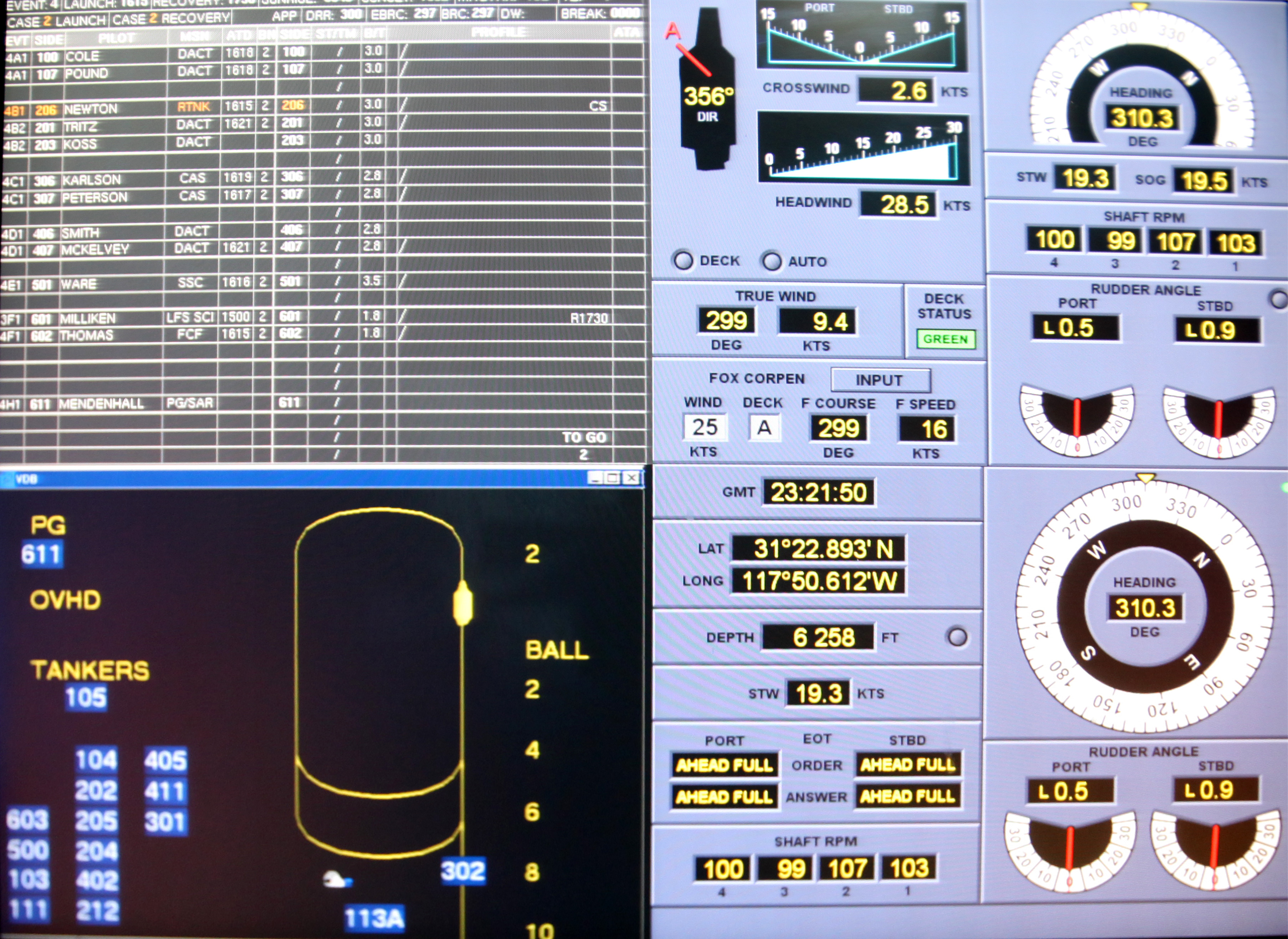
Monitor showing data about Nimitz

On 21 September 2001, after sea trials in the Virginia Capes, Nimitz began to transit around South America to her new home port of NAS North Island in San Diego, California, arriving there on 13 November 2001. Aircraft from Carrier Air Reserve Wing 20 were embarked for the transit. From January to May 2002, a four-month post-shakedown maintenance availability was completed at North Island; during this time, an advanced combat direction system was installed.

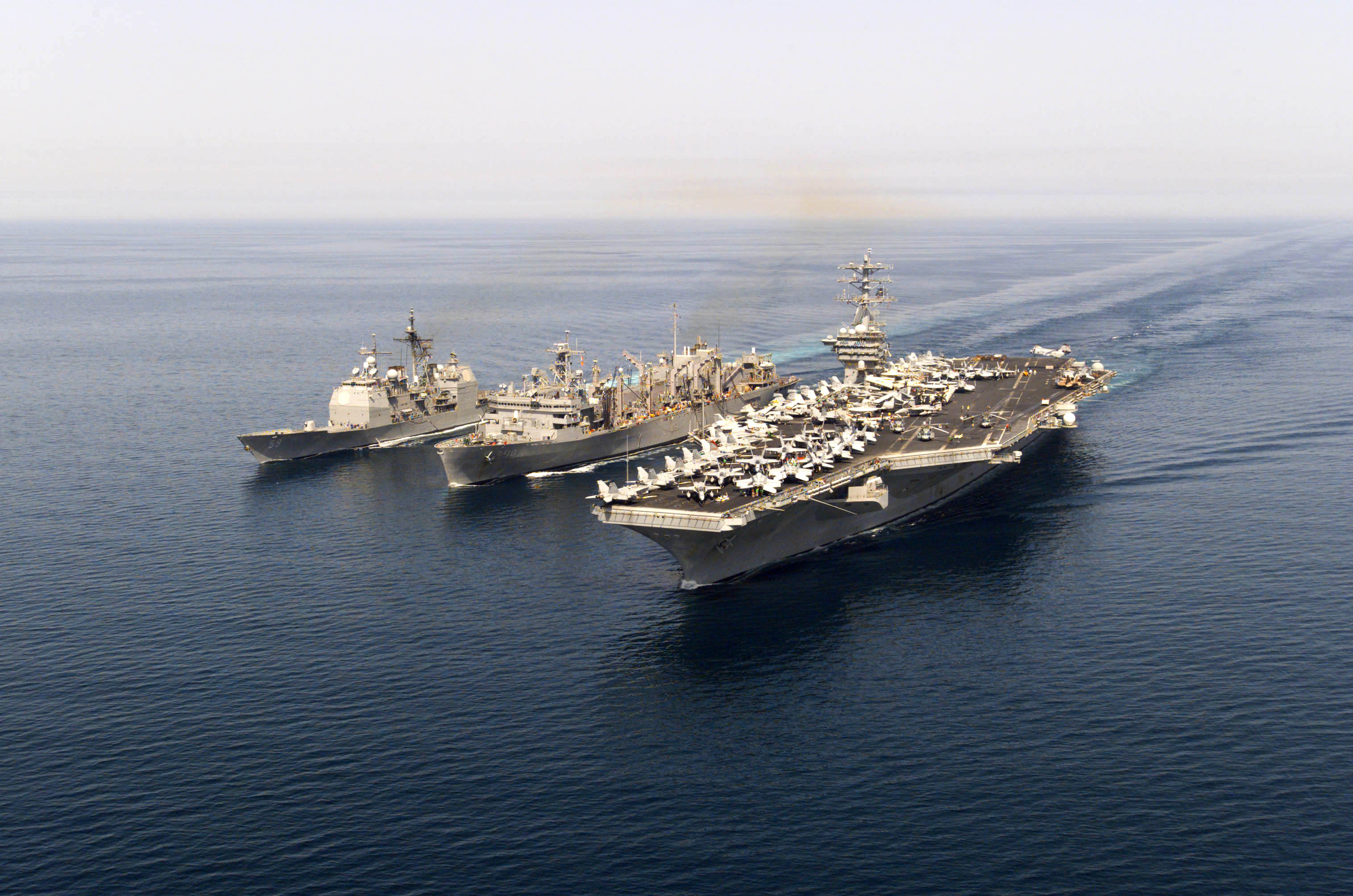
Nimitz with the ships Bridge and Princeton during Operation Iraqi Freedom, 15 April 2003

Nimitz's 11th operational deployment began on 3 March 2003. The group relieved USS Abraham Lincoln in the Persian Gulf in mid-April 2003, launching Carrier Air Wing 11 aircraft sorties over Iraq in support of Operation Iraqi Freedom (OIF) and Afghanistan in support of Operation Enduring Freedom. She returned to San Diego on 5 November 2003. Nimitz and CVW-11 were awarded the 2003 Battle "E" and Flatley Award in early 2004.

In November 2004, Nimitz was contacted by USS Princeton, which was tracking reported unidentified flying objects. Princeton subsequently contacted two Navy F/A-18F fighters from Nimitz, whose cockpit instrumentation recorded data and imagery that some pilots interpreted as an object accelerating and maneuvering at extraordinary speeds. The incident was publicized in December 2017 along with details of the Advanced Aviation Threat Identification Program.

Nimitz, again with CVW-11 embarked, deployed to the Persian Gulf on 7 May 2005, returning on 8 November 2005. This deployment marked three decades of service, and was depicted in the Emmy Award-winning 2008 PBS documentary series Carrier. In June 2006, Nimitz was awarded the 2005 Battle "E".

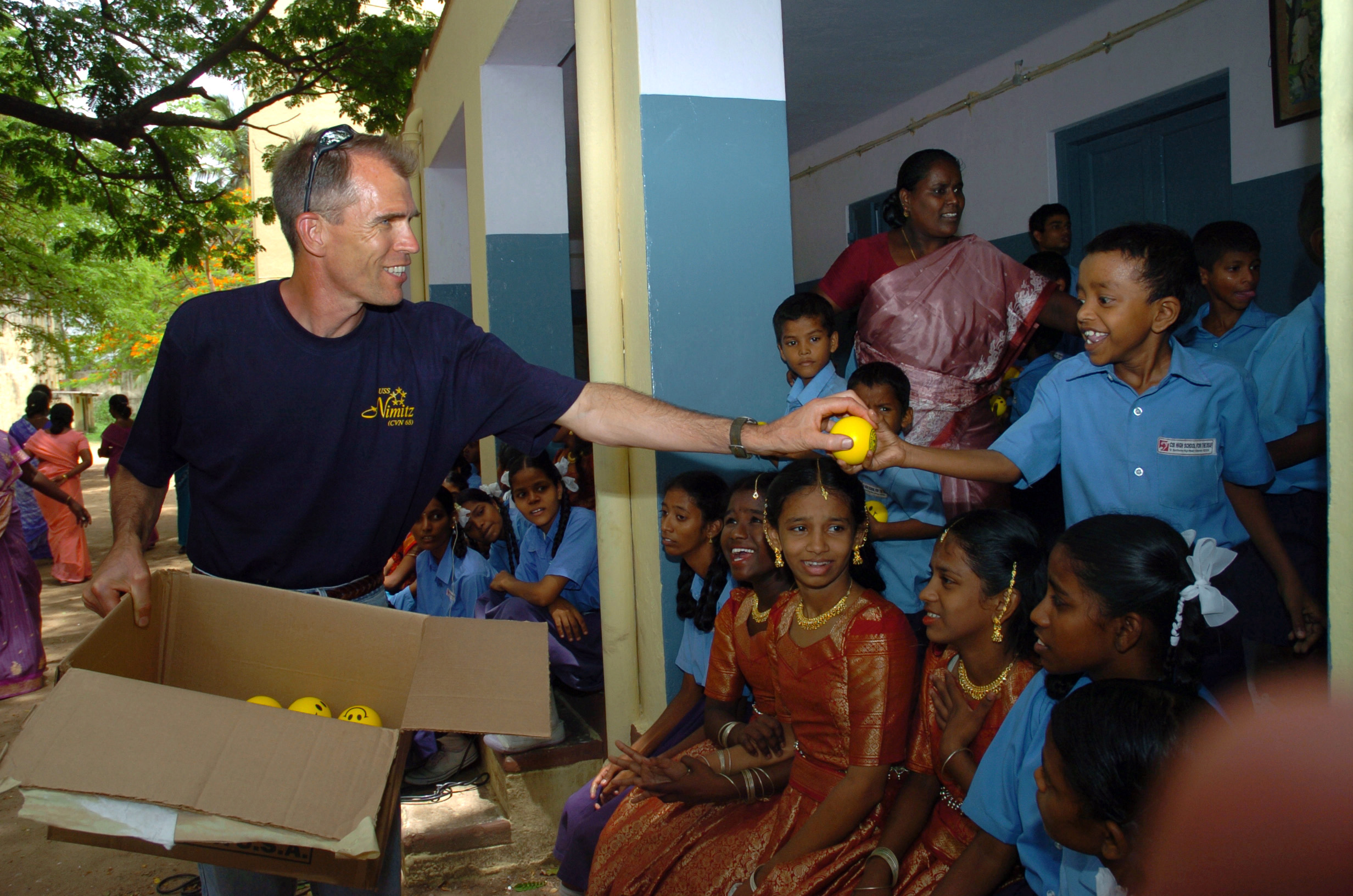
Lt. Cmdr. David Bynum, a Navy chaplain aboard Nimitz, passed out happy face sponge balls to the students of CSI High School for the Deaf in Chennai, India during a community relations visit in July 2007.

The carrier departed North Island for her 13th deployment on 2 April 2007, to the Arabian Sea, relieving USS Dwight D. Eisenhower in support of OIF. The carrier anchored off Chennai, India on 2 July 2007, as part of efforts to expand bilateral defense cooperation between India and the United States. Sailors participated in community work in Chennai prior to departing, on 5 July 2007, along with the destroyer USS Pinckney towards the Persian Gulf, and then returned to North Island on 30 September 2007.

On 24 January 2008, Nimitz deployed to the Pacific for a "surge"-deployment. On 9 February 2008, two Russian Tu-95 Bear bombers overflew the carrier in the Western Pacific. Four F/A-18C Hornets were launched when the bombers were 500 miles (800 km) away from the US ships, and intercepted the bombers 50 miles (80 km) south of Nimitz. Two F/A-18s trailed one of the bombers, which twice flew over the deck of the carrier at an altitude of 2,000 feet (610 m), while the other two F/A-18s trailed another Tu-95 circling about 50 miles (80 km) away from the carrier. Reportedly, no radio communication occurred between the American and Russian aircraft. According to the Department of Defense, one of the two aircraft was said to have flown above Nimitz at an altitude of 2,000 feet (610 m). On the same day, Russian aircraft entered Japanese airspace, which caused the Japanese to raise protest to the Russian ambassador in Tokyo.

Again, on 5 March 2008, a Russian bomber came within 3 to 5 nautical miles (6 to 9 km) and flew 2,000 feet (610 m) above Nimitz, and the battle group. Two F/A-18 fighters intercepted the Russian aircraft and escorted it out of the area.

Nimitz was awarded the Navy Battle "E" for battle efficiency for 2007 along with the Ney award for food service excellence, and returned to her home port of San Diego on 3 June 2008.

The Nimitz Strike Group, including CVW-11, departed the US for a scheduled Western Pacific deployment on 31 July 2009, and began to fly combat missions in support of Operation Enduring Freedom on 21 September.

=== 2010s ===
In January 2010, while in the Persian Gulf, the ship was awarded the Meritorious Unit Commendation for back-to-back deployments in support of the wars in Iraq and Afghanistan in 2007 and 2008. The award was presented by Admiral Gary Roughead in a ceremony on the ship on 6 January 2010.

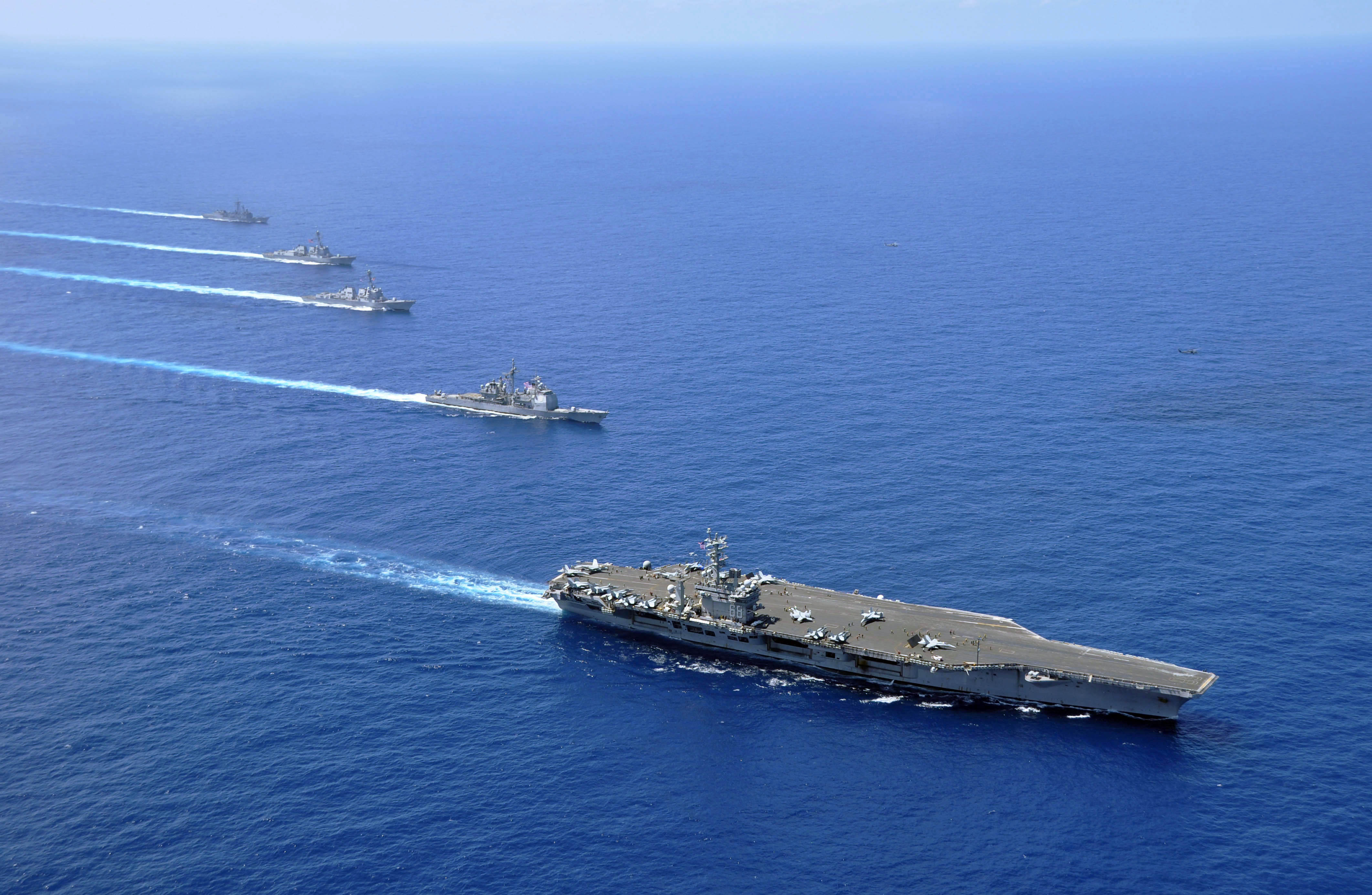
Nimitz sails in formation with Chosin, Sampson, Pinckney, and Rentz, 15 February 2010.

Nimitz visited Hong Kong for five days in February 2010 to allow the crew to rest and visit the city. The visit occurred despite China previously preventing a visit by the carrier USS Kitty Hawk.

On 9 December 2010, the Navy formally announced that Everett, Washington, was to be the new home port for Nimitz. This move was expected to save the Navy $100 million. On 9 March 2012, Nimitz arrived at her new homeport of Naval Station Everett after spending nearly a week at sea conducting postoverhaul sea trials.

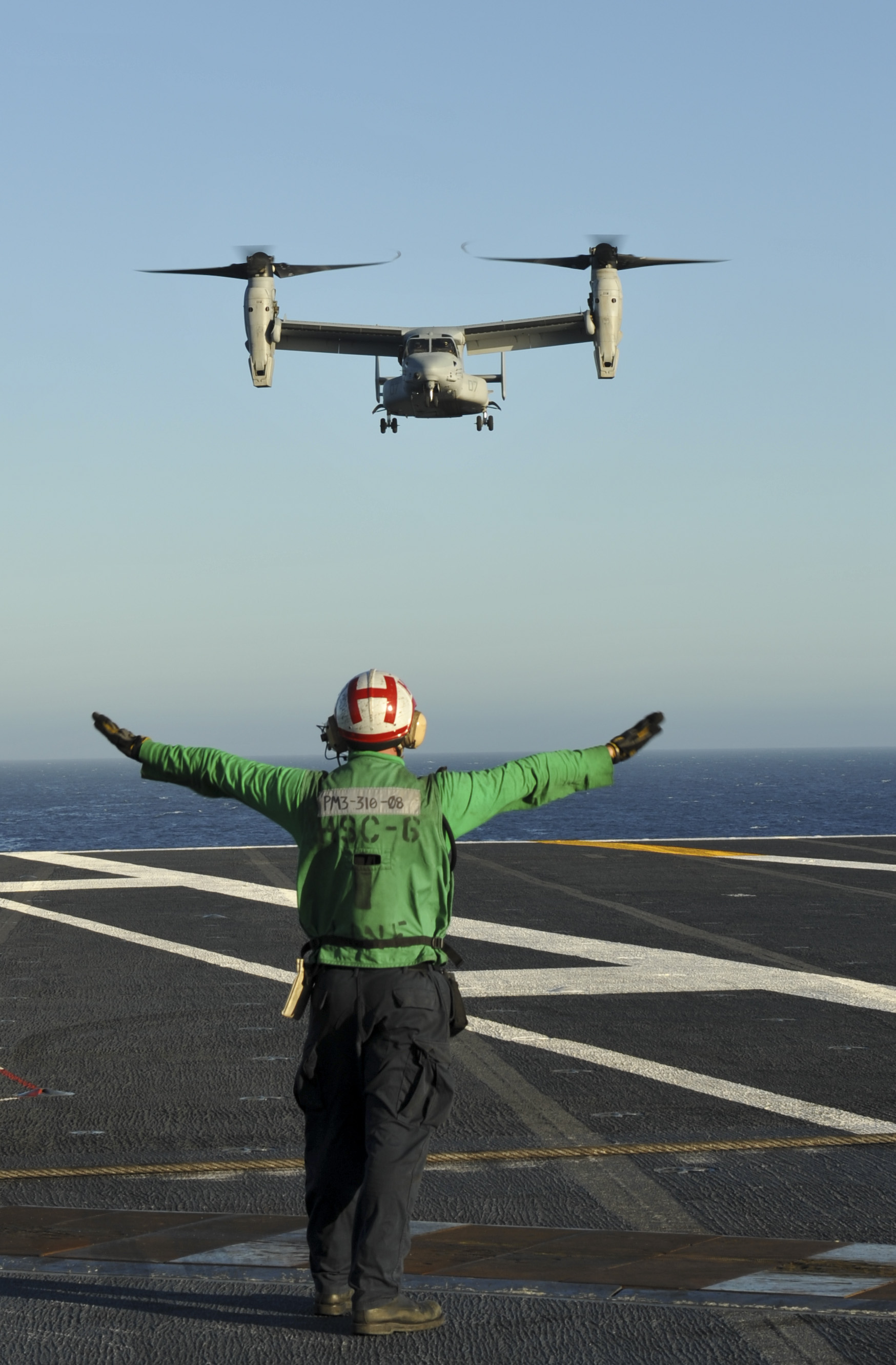
An MV-22 Osprey of VMM-165 lands on Nimitz in October 2012

In March 2012, Nimitz arrived at the new home port of Naval Station Everett in Washington after more than a year of maintenance work in Bremerton, replacing sister carrier Abraham Lincoln. On 3 August 2012, Nimitz departed from Pearl Harbor after a two-day port call, arriving at NAS North Island on 9 August 2012 to begin Fleet Replacement Squadron carrier qualifications. On 6 October 2012, a Bell Boeing V-22 Osprey tilt-rotor aircraft from squadron VMM-165 landed and refueled on board Nimitz. This operation was part of an evaluation of the feasibility of the MV-22 as a potential replacement for the C-2 Greyhound carrier onboard delivery cargo transport aircraft.

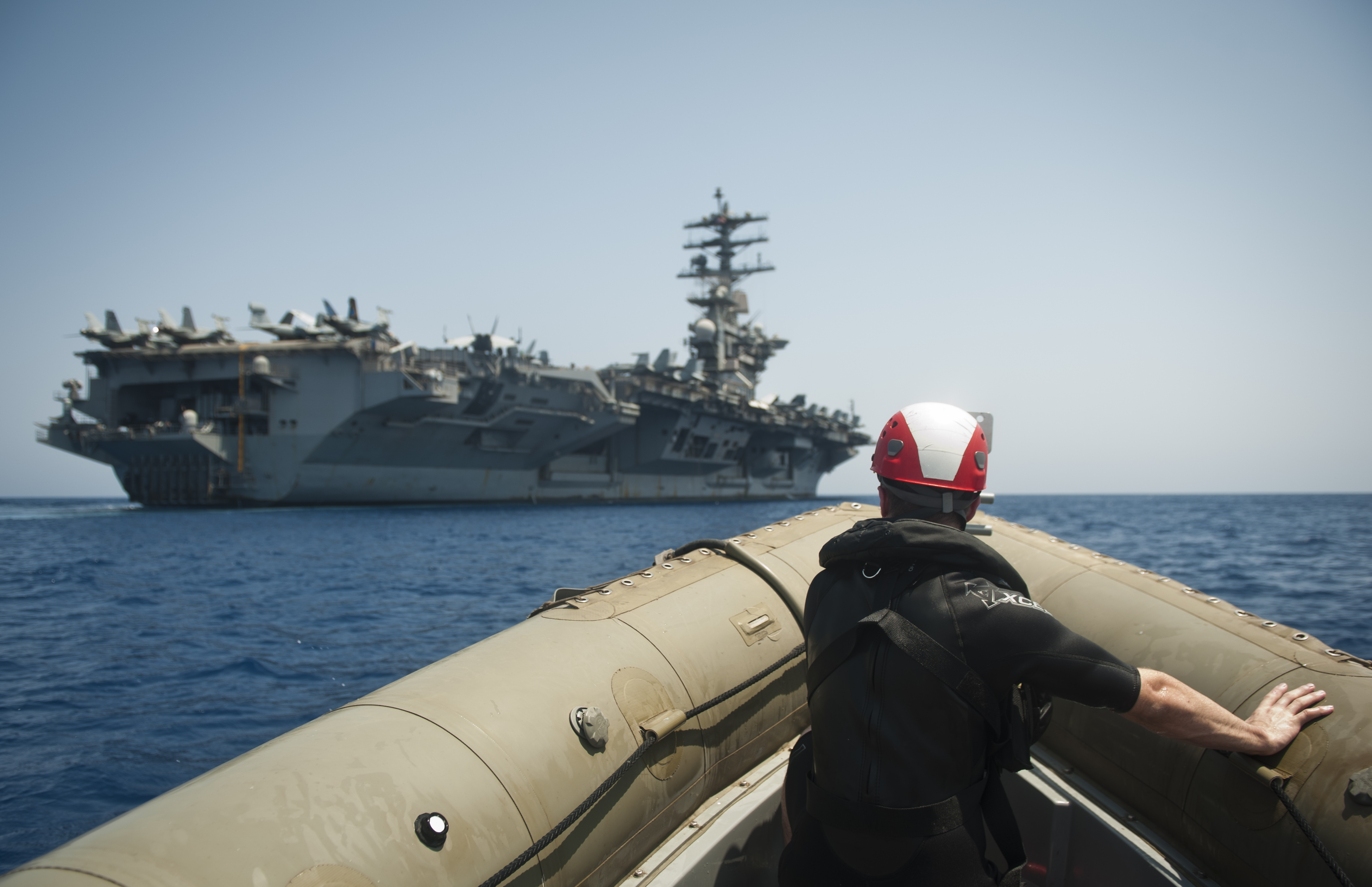
Inflatable boat approaches Nimitz during a search-and-rescue drill, 7 September 2013.

The BBC reported that Nimitz was located in the Persian Gulf, ready to contribute to an operation against Syria when President Obama ordered a military strike. Two days later, it reported that the carrier task group had been rerouted westwards across the Arabian Sea.

Nimitz, after eight months at sea, reportedly transited the Suez Canal on 20 October 2013, into the U.S. 6th Fleet area of responsibility, where the Navy intended to keep her for a few weeks, conducting joint training with allied nations before returning home. Nimitz returned to Everett on 16 December 2013.

In late 2014, following the completion of work-up qualifications, Nimitz participated in her first deployment, a two-week multinational fleet exercise involving the Third Fleet, as well as ships from the Royal Canadian Navy and JMSDF. Following the conclusion of the exercise on 3 November, the first F-35C Lightning II to land on an aircraft carrier recovered aboard Nimitz to begin a two-week Development Testing I deployment. This had a pair of aircraft from VX-23 undertaking carrier operations of launch, recovery, and handling aboard ship in both day and night conditions. The initial deployment was completed on 14 November 2014. In 2015, Nimitz transferred to Bremerton to undergo a 16-month maintenance cycle.

On 1 June 2017, Nimitz left Naval Base Kitsap for her next scheduled deployment. This deployment was against ISIS in Iraq and Syria. Her F/A-18s played an important role in the Battle of Tal Afar, providing precision air support for advancing Iraqi soldiers.

On 1 March 2018, Nimitz entered dry dock at Puget Sound Naval Shipyard for 10 months of overhaul.

=== 2020s ===
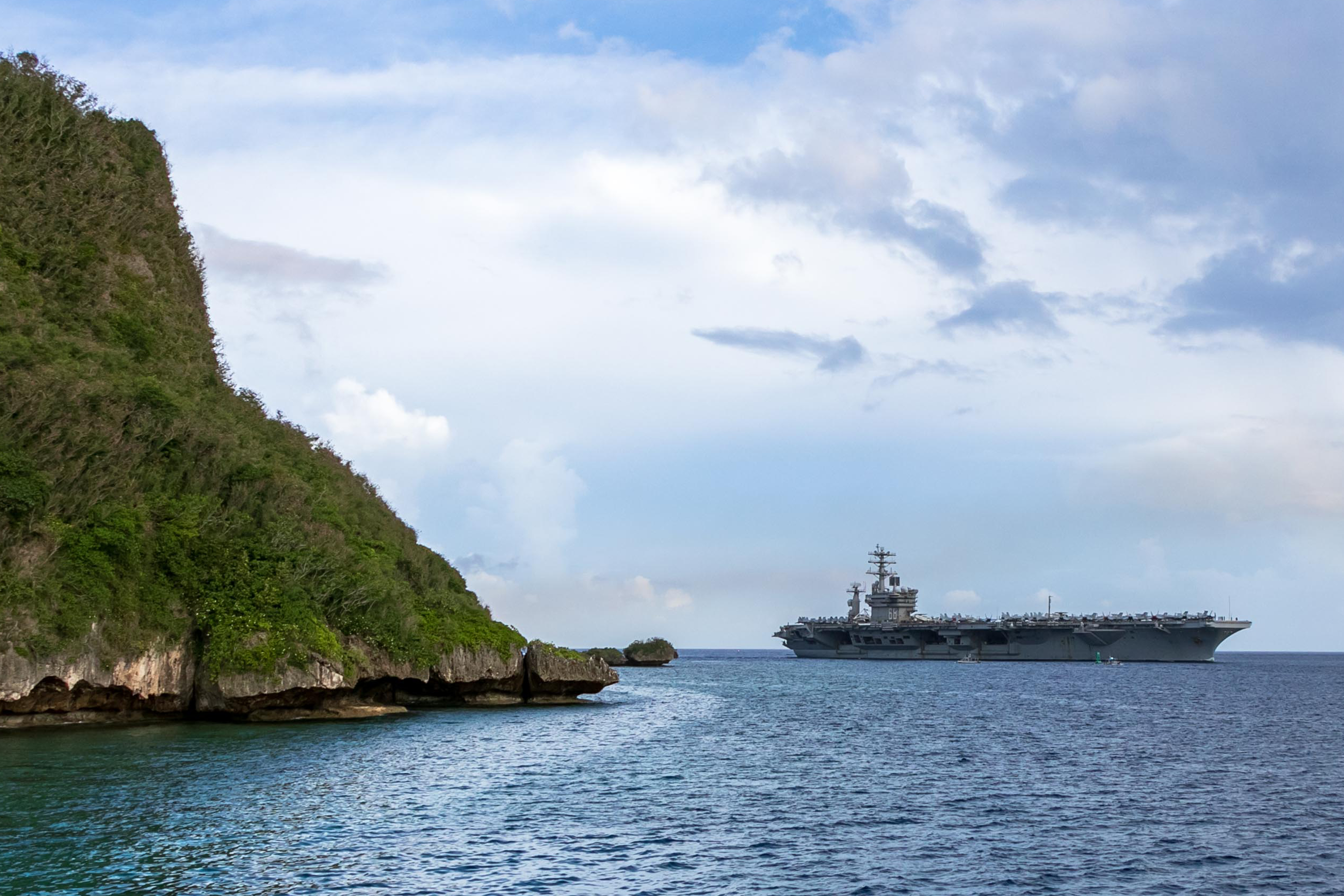
Nimitz enters Apra Harbor, Guam, in June 2020

In April 2020, a coronavirus (likely COVID-19) was reported to have spread to Nimitz when the first case was reported on 7 April. One sailor had received a positive result the previous week after exhibiting symptoms, and was subsequently placed in isolation and removed from the ship. Another crew member also tested positive, but was reported to have not been working on the ship. On 27 April, Nimitz completed a 27-day quarantine and began COMPTUEX training.

On 5 July 2020, the ship was deployed in the South China Sea along with USS Ronald Reagan. On 31 December, acting Secretary of Defense Chris Miller ordered Nimitz to return directly to her home port following a nearly 10-month deployment in the Fifth Fleet area of operation. The carrier was at the time supporting the withdrawal of U.S. troops in Somalia along with USS Makin Island and her amphibious ready group. On 3 January 2021, in an abrupt reversal, acting Defense Secretary Miller ordered Nimitz to redeploy due to "Recent threats issued by Iranian leaders against President Trump and other U.S. government officials."

In May 2022, Nimitz led Carrier Strike Group 11 in the Eastern Pacific Ocean. On 28 November 2022, Nimitz departed Kitsap and sailed to San Diego to pick up the carrier strike group leadership. She left San Diego on 3 December for her Pacific deployment leading Carrier Strike Group 11 and embarking Carrier Air Wing 17. Nimitz logged her 350,000th arrested landing on 22 April 2023. Nimitz returned from her deployment on 2 July 2023.

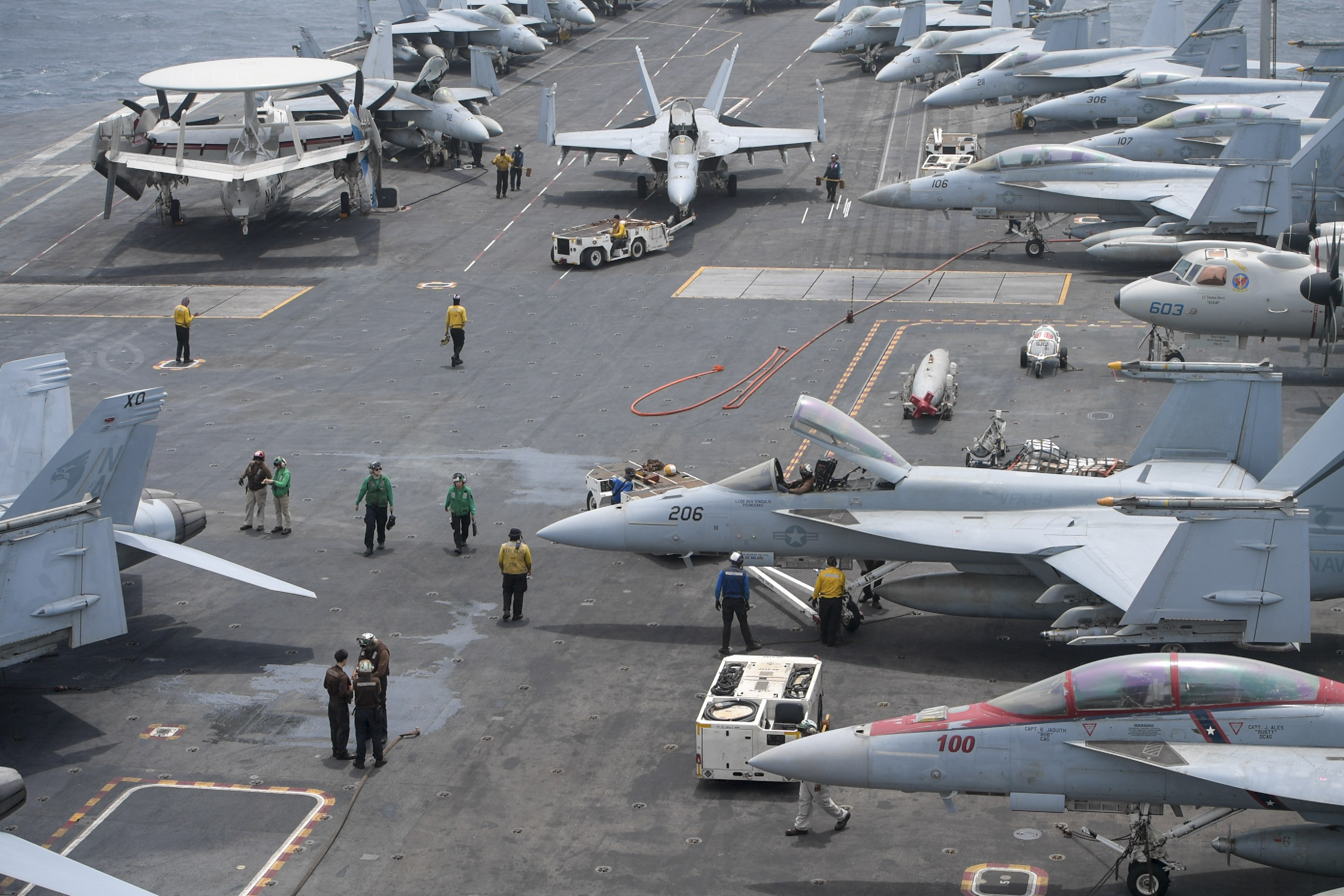
Flight deck of Nimitz in June 2025

Nimitz departed for her final global deployment on 21 March 2025. After the events of Operation Rising Lion and Operation True Promise 3, Nimitz and her accompanying strike group were en route to the Middle East.

On 17 June 2025 in response to the Israel-Iran conflict, Nimitz moved south from the South China Sea through the Singapore Strait and the Malacca Strait before entering the Indian Ocean, likely heading for the Middle East to bolster US defenses in the region. On 26 October, in separate incidents, an MH-60R Seahawk helicopter and an F/A-18F Super Hornet fighter jet operating from the aircraft carrier crashed in the South China Sea. These two incidents occurred 30 minutes apart. Both crews were safely recovered. The cause of the crashes is still unknown and under investigation. Nimitz returned from her final deployment on 16 December 2025.

On 10 March 2026, USS Nimitz departed Naval Base Kitsap to prepare for her decommissioning at Naval Station Norfolk in Virginia. She is sailing from the Pacific Ocean to the Atlantic Ocean via Cape Horn at the tip of South America, after which she will begin heading toward Norfolk. This journey is expected to take about two to three weeks to complete. During her final voyage, she will also take part in the upcoming Southern Seas 2026 exercises. Though this voyage was intended to be her last, on March 14, the Navy extended her active service through March 2027, to maintain the 11-carrier mandate, while USS John F. Kennedy is being readied for active service.

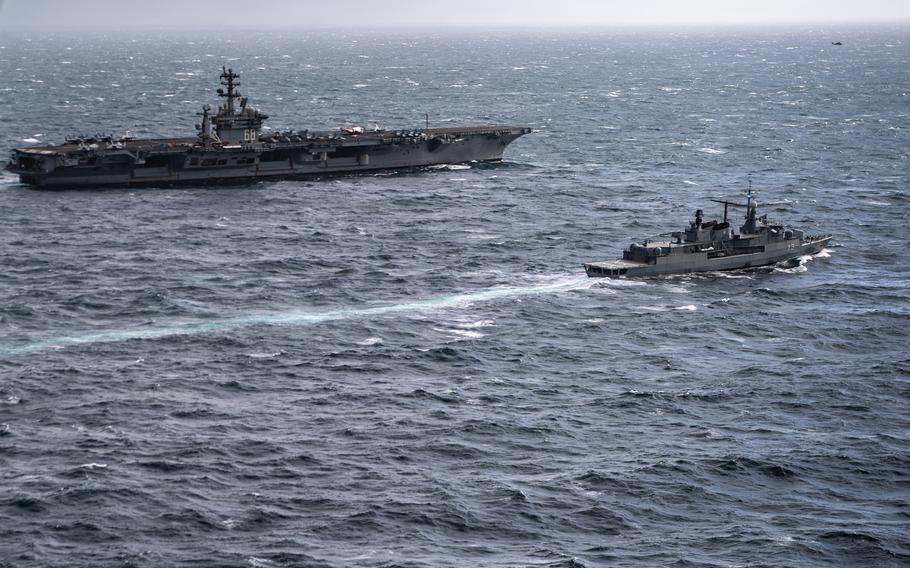
Argentine navy destroyer ARA Sarandi steams alongside the carrier Nimitz during a bilateral maritime training in the southwestern Atlantic Ocean on April 29, 2026.

On 3 May 2026, Nimitz marked 51 years since its commissioning into the U.S. Navy, capping a week in which it steamed around the tip of South America and held joint exercises with Argentina’s navy.

On 20 May 2026, Nimitz along with her Carrier Strike Group, had arrived in the Caribbean to support Operation Southern Spear as tensions with Cuba rise.

On Friday July 3rd 2026 Nimitz arrived in the New York harbor ahead of 4th of July International Naval Review 250. Nimitz departed New York and arrived at her new home port at Norfolk on July 9th, 2026 .

== Planned retirement ==
The Nimitz-class carriers have a lifespan around 50 years. Estimates on decommissioning for Nimitz herself were updated in April 2022, with the Navy Press Corps indicating, "USS Nimitz (CVN 68) was planned to be removed from the battle force in fiscal year (FY) 2025, when the Ship Terminal Off-load Program (STOP) begins, with inactivation scheduled to begin in 2027."

In March 2025, the Navy announced that Nimitz would deploy one last time, then arrive at her new homeport of Norfolk Naval Station in Virginia no later than 12 April 2026. At that point, she will begin the one-year STOP process before shifting to Newport News Shipbuilding for initial defueling and deactivation.

In March 2026, the Navy had announced that it had decided to prolong the service of Nimitz to March 2027 wanting to maintain its 11 carrier fleet while waiting for the commissioning of the second Ford-class carrier, the John F. Kennedy which is expected to arrive in March of the same year.

== Awards and decorations ==

Navy Unit Commendation with two stars	Meritorious Unit Commendation	Navy E Ribbon with four Battle "E" devices
Navy Expeditionary Medal with six stars	National Defense Service Medal with one star	Armed Forces Expeditionary Medal with four stars
Southwest Asia Service Medal	Global War on Terrorism Expeditionary Medal with one star	Sea Service Deployment Ribbon with eleven stars

== In popular culture ==
The Final Countdown, a 1980 alternate history science fiction film about a contemporary aircraft carrier that travels through time to the day before the 1941 attack on Pearl Harbor, was set and filmed on board the real-life USS Nimitz.

Nimitz is the focus of The Big Aircraft Carrier in Little Mammoth Media's BIG Adventure Series. In it, they talk how the navy ship works for children including a complete tour of the carrier, how the sailors and pilots work and even all the training they undertake.

The PBS series Carrier followed the May–November 2005 deployment of Nimitz to the Persian Gulf, documenting the life and shipboard routines of the crew over ten episodes.

== See also ==
- Carrier Strike Group Eleven
- List of aircraft carriers
- List of aircraft carriers of the United States Navy
- USS Nimitz UFO incident
