= Hope Is a Thing With Feathers =

Hope Is a Thing With Feathers may refer to:

- "Hope" is the thing with feathers, a poem by American poet Emily Dickinson
- Hope Is a Thing with Feathers, a 2003 album by Trailer Bride
- Hope Is the Thing with Feathers, a 2000 non-fiction book about bird extinction by Christopher Cokinos
- Hope Is the Thing with Feathers, 2017 choral work by American composer Lauren Bernofsky
