= Jesco White =

American folk dancer and entertainer

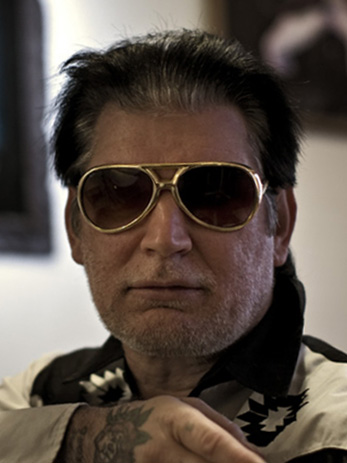
- Jesco White in 2011
- Born: July 30, 1956 (age 70); Bandytown, West Virginia, U.S.
- Other name: "The Dancing Outlaw"
- Occupations: Mountain Dancer, Entertainer
- Years active: 1980s–present
- Spouse(s): Norma Jean White (1974–2009; her death); Alida Raquel White (2011–present)

Jesco White, also known as the "Dancing Outlaw" (born July 30, 1956) is an American folk dancer and entertainer. He is best known as the subject of three American documentary films that detail his desire to follow in the footsteps of his famous father, D. Ray White, while dealing with depression, drug addiction, alcoholism, and the poverty that affects some parts of rural Appalachia.

== Personal life ==
Jesco White was born in Bandytown, a tiny community located in the Appalachian Mountains of Boone County, West Virginia, to Donald Ray White (1927–1985), also known as D. Ray White, and Bertie Mae White. White's father was profiled in the Smithsonian Folkways documentary Talking Feet: Solo Southern Dance: Buck, Flatfoot and Tap (1987) as one of the greatest mountain dancers in the United States. Following in the footsteps of his father, Jesco's dance style is a subtle mix of tap and clog dancing that is native to Appalachia. After the death of his father, Jesco obtained D. Ray's tapping shoes which he wears while performing. Jesco White's dancing has been featured in at least three documentaries.

White was married to Norma Jean White (née Wilson) from 1974 till her death in 2009 and married Alida White in 2011.

In an undisclosed year, White’s house burned down, destroying $50,000 worth of Elvis memorabilia. White stated that the incident sent him into a state of depression.

== Shooting incident and legal troubles ==
In 1985, while finalizing the film Talking Feet, D. Ray, Jesco, and his younger brother Dorsey were involved in a domestic dispute. Steve Allen Rowe used his 12-gauge shotgun to shoot D. Ray once in the chest, Jesco received one neck wound, and Dorsey a single gunshot to the eye. D. Ray was the only fatality of the disturbance, who was reportedly protecting his youngest son during a drunken disagreement.

=== 2009 arrest ===
In April 2009, White was featured in the documentary The Wild and Wonderful Whites of West Virginia, produced by Storm Taylor and MTV's Johnny Knoxville and Jeff Tremaine. The film was premiered at the Tribeca Film Festival in New York. White has claimed that his portrayal in the documentary was an act and is not an accurate depiction of the White family.

The week after the release of Wild and Wonderful, Jesco White and his sister, Sue Bob White, were arrested in West Virginia on suspicion of drug-related crimes. White gave an on-camera interview while in jail and stated that he had been drug-free for 30 years. White said that he is not a bad person and that he was "embarrassed" and "hurt" by the arrest. Shortly after his arrest, White was bonded out of jail by the producers of the documentary. A month after his arrest, the charges against White were dismissed due to lack of evidence.

== Depictions in media ==
=== Dancing Outlaw ===
White was first profiled on the Public Broadcasting Service's Different Drummer series. The first of these documentaries was Dancing Outlaw (1991), directed by Jacob Young, which featured him at home in West Virginia and gave audiences a glimpse into his troubled life. Young originally came to Boone County in search of D. Ray who had been murdered years prior. The TV series aimed to showcase "the unsung geniuses and charismatic madmen of Appalachian county." The director used this opportunity to unveil Jesco's talent and introduce America to the Dancing Outlaw. Viewers are acquainted with Jesco's three distinct personalities. "The gentle and loving Jesse, the violent and dangerous Jesco, and the extremely strange Elvis." This is the first of many mentions he makes regarding his lifelong struggle with his personality disorder. His admiration of Elvis is apparent in his stage attire and Elvis room within his home which White claims "saved his life from certain doom". The film won an American Film Institute Award and an Emmy for Best Documentary, was screened at the Museum of Modern Art, and was named best public television program in 1992.

=== Dancing Outlaw II: Jesco Goes to Hollywood ===
Dancing Outlaw II (1999) (also directed by Jacob Young) chronicles White's trip to Los Angeles to appear in the episode "I Pray the Lord My Stove to Keep" of the sitcom Roseanne as the Elvis impersonating "Dan's Clog-Dancing Cousin".

=== The Wild and Wonderful Whites of West Virginia ===
The documentary The Wild and Wonderful Whites of West Virginia (2009) directed by Julien Nitzberg follows the White Family for one year, according to Mamie White, eldest of D. Ray and Bertie Mae’s children. It primarily consists of first person interviews detailing the poverty, crime, addiction and the ramifications of the coal-mining industry on Appalachian society.

=== Grand Theft Auto V ===
Jesco White provides his voice as the DJ of Rebel Radio in the video game Grand Theft Auto V. He also makes a cameo in-game as an Easter egg, where the player can find a character depiction of Jesco doing his mountain dance. The easter egg is found in the Alamo Sea region of San Andreas, dancing to an Ozark Mountain Daredevils song being played on a small boombox behind him. Motion capture technology was used to help depict Jesco's unique style of dancing.

== Other depictions ==
- It Came from Trafalgar (2009) directed by Solomon Mortamur
- The film White Lightnin' (2009) directed by Dominic Murphy is very loosely based on the life of Jesco White
- Appeared in the Beck video "Loser"
- Is Ga-Ga-Pee-Pap Cuyler in several episodes of the animated television series Squidbillies
- Has cameo as himself in the 2017 film Logan Lucky

Numerous musicians have made tribute songs for Jesco White and the White family. These include:

- Hank Williams III "D. Ray White" on Straight to Hell
- Trailer Bride "Jesco" on High Seas
- The Kentucky Headhunters "Jessico" on Songs from the Grass String Ranch
- Sam Black Church "Jesco (The Dancing Outlaw)" on That Which Does Not Kill Us.... Makes Us Stronger
- Ekoostik Hookah "Dancing Outlaw" on Ohio Grown

Jesco has also been sampled or referred to by numerous musicians, including the bands Ministry, Mastodon, Live, Big & Rich, Əkoostik hookah, Jim Shelley, The Atomic Bitchwax, Headcrash, and Tanner Flowers.
