= Without Feathers =

Book by Woody Allen

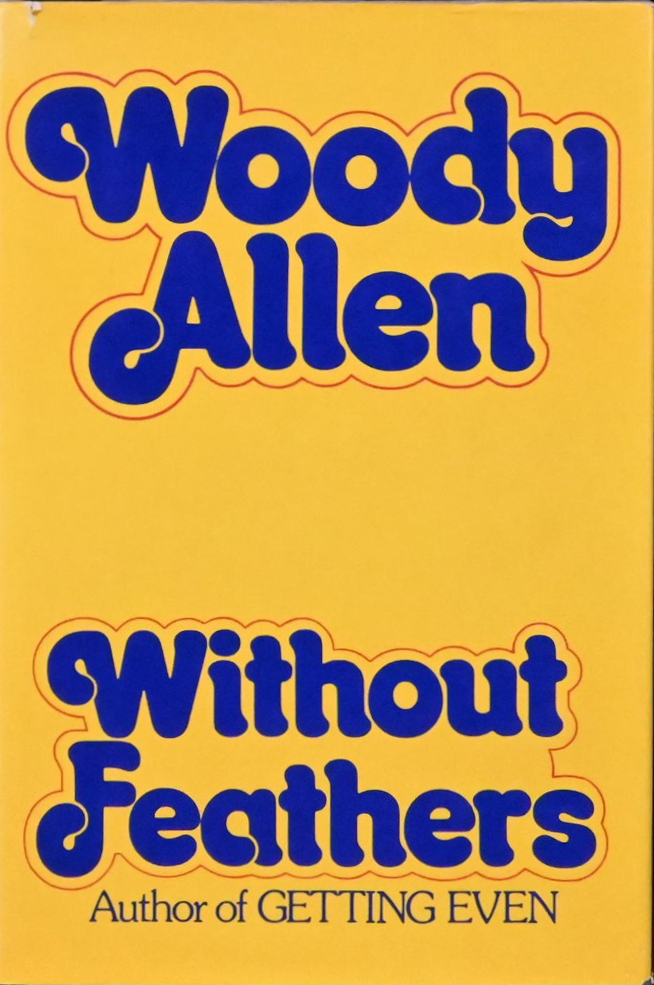
- First edition
- Author: Woody Allen
- Language: English
- Publisher: Random House
- Publication date: 12 May 1975
- Media type: Print (Hardcover and Paperback)
- Pages: 210 pp (hardcover edition) & 224 pp (paperback edition)
- ISBN: 978-0-394-49743-3 (hardcover edition)
- OCLC: 1217497
- Dewey Decimal: 818/.5/407
- LC Class: PS3551.L44 W5

Without Feathers is a 1975 collection of humorous essays and two one-act plays, Death and God, by Woody Allen. It is one of Allen's best-known books, spending four months on the New York Times Best Seller List.

== Title meaning ==
The title Without Feathers is a reference to Emily Dickinson's poem "'Hope' is the thing with feathers", reflecting Allen's neurotic sense of hopelessness. The poem is mentioned in one of the stories.

== Contents ==
1. Selections from The Allen Notebooks
2. Examining Psychic Phenomena
3. A Guide to Some of the Lesser Ballets
4. The Scrolls
5. Lovborg's Women Considered
6. The Whore of Mensa
7. Death (A Play)
8. The Early Essays
9. A Brief Yet Helpful Guide to Civil Disobedience
10. Match Wits With Inspector Ford
11. The Irish Genius
12. God (A Play)
13. Fabulous Tales and Mythical Beasts
14. But Soft. Real Soft.
15. If the Impressionists Had Been Dentists
16. No Kaddish for Weinstein
17. Fine Times: An Oral Memoir
18. Slang Origins
