= Death (play) =

Death is a play by Woody Allen. It was first published in 1975, along with God, and other short stories in Woody Allen's book Without Feathers. It is a comedic version of Eugène Ionesco's 1959 play The Killer. His 1991 film Shadows and Fog was based on this play.

== Plot ==
Kleinman, a meek salesman, is awoken late one night by a mob led by a man named Hacker, who forces him to join their vigilante group dedicated to catching a serial killer who frequently changes his modus operandi. Hacker claims to have a plan to catch the maniac, but when Kleinman asks about what he has to do, each man in the group says that they are only aware of their own part of the plan so the killer won't catch on. They march him to the street to stand guard and leave him on his own to await his part in the plan.

Kleinman is eventually joined by a doctor, who tells him that his interest in the case is to catch the killer so he can understand a psychopathic mind. The doctor leaves, and Kleinman hears screams in the night. He then meets a prostitute, Gina, and the two contemplate death and the possibility of life in the universe. Gina eventually leaves too, before the doctor returns mortally wounded by the maniac. A policeman and another man find the body. The man tells Kleinman that Hacker was murdered, but by a rogue faction of his vigilante mob who splintered off when they disagreed with his ideas on how to catch the killer. The two mobs arrive and demand that Kleinman join them, before getting into a large fight.

A third mob shows up, having hired a clairvoyant named Hans Spiro to identify the killer. Spiro says that Kleinman is the maniac, and the mobs join to perform a kangaroo court and sentence him to death. Just before Kleinman's hanging, a man arrives to tell the group that the killer has been spotted. The mob apologizes, and all run off. Kleinman is again left alone, before the real maniac, who resembles Kleinman, enters. The two converse briefly, and the killer admits to being a psychopath but insists that he can kill easily by pretending to be sane before he stabs Kleinman and exits. Kleinman is discovered dying by the mob, who bicker over his body until he expires. After Kleinman's death, another man arrives and tells the mob that the killer has been spotted in a different location, and they all run off again.
