= The Wild and Wonderful Whites of West Virginia =

- Directed by: Julien Nitzberg
- Produced by: Katie Doering; Julien Nitzberg; Storm Taylor
- Starring: Jesco White
- Edited by: Ben Daughtrey
- Music by: Deke Dickerson; Hank Williams III
- Production companies: Dickhouse Productions; MTV Studios
- Distributed by: Tribeca Films
- Release dates: April 2009 (Tribeca Film Festival); May 5, 2010 (United States)
- Running time: 88 minutes
- Language: English

The Wild and Wonderful Whites of West Virginia is a 2009 documentary film directed by Julien Nitzberg chronicling the White family of Boone County, West Virginia.

== Synopsis ==
The film follows the White family over the course of a year in their daily lives through first-person interviews. The film mentions the details of the death of patriarch Donald Ray "D. Ray" White, as well as his rise to stardom as one of the most famous mountain dancers of his time. The illness of his widow, Bertie Mae White, is documented throughout the course of the film. Locals consider Bertie Mae "The Miracle Woman" because of her lifelong dedication to raising abandoned children. Throughout the film, Bertie is seen supporting her family despite her intolerance of their dangerous and reckless behavior. The younger generations of Whites are followed to drug deals, criminal trials, hospital beds, and jail cells to recount the wild and outlandish events in their lives. A group of local professionals in Boone County act as a Greek chorus as they speak about the Whites, mostly criticizing their negative influence on the community.

Stemming from generations of coal miners working in risky job conditions, most of the White family possesses a fatalistic attitude and lack a fear of death. Various members recall violent fights with family members, neighbors, and other locals. Other legal troubles include larceny, prescription fraud, shootings, armed robbery, forgery, stabbings, and child-custody battles. D. Ray worked in the coal mines during the scrip payment era; Mamie explains how D. Ray's frustration with his employers' corrupt practices led him to "outsmarting the system." D. Ray legally signed each of his children up for "crazy checks" during their early adolescence. Mamie discloses to the audience that each month, she and all the other offspring of D. Ray and Bertie Mae receive social security checks monthly from the government due to their inability to hold employment because of alleged psychiatric disability.

== The Whites ==
Six of D. Ray and Bertie's 13 children are featured in the film.

=== D. Ray and Bertie's children ===
- Jesco White (born 1956) – son of D. Ray and Bertie; a well-known mountain dancer, he was previously the subject of the documentary film Dancing Outlaw.
- Mamie White – oldest daughter of D. Ray and Bertie; girlfriend of Billy Hastings; she introduces the family at the start of the film. Mamie tells of her brother Dorsey White, who was shot in the face during a dispute with neighbors and lost an eye; he later died of an unintentional self-inflicted gunshot wound. Mamie's boyfriend Billy Hastings is a central figure in the family's past and present. His involvement in a dispute led to the shooting death of D. Ray White by Steve Roe. His altercation with Brandon Poe is described in detail in the film.
- Ona Fontaine White – 1951–1971 – daughter of D. Ray and Bertie; murdered by ex-husband Clyde Davis.
- Bo White – daughter of D. Ray and Bertie; mother of Kirk White and Derek Castle.
- Poney White – the only one of D. Ray and Bertie's children to have left Boone County at the time the documentary was produced. He moved to Minneapolis and is a house painter. Poney states he felt he needed to leave West Virginia to improve his life, a decision he made after a prescription fraud conviction. Despite leaving the public-school system in seventh grade, Poney is one of the few employed members of the family. His daughter Virginia recounts her inability to obtain employment because of her last name before they relocated. His son Jerry rehashes mistreatment from educators in the local school because of his lineage.
- Sue Bob White – the youngest of D. Ray and Bertie's children; she is a former stripper and the mother of Brandon and Ashley Poe. She was arrested in 2024 on allegations of stomping a kitten to death.

=== Grandchildren/cousins ===
- Kirk White – daughter of Bo White; and sister of Derek Castle. Kirk's children, Tylor and Monica, are featured in the film. During the film, she gives birth to Monica, who is taken away by Child Protective Services. Kirk checks herself into an alcohol and drug rehab facility in order to regain custody. Kirk later relinquished her rights to Monica in hopes for a better life for her.
- Derek Castle – son of Bo White; brother of Kirk White. Currently lives in West Virginia, in the same trailer as his mother. Derek is unemployed but sells used cell phones and baseball cards on eBay. He is still in active addiction and has been arrested for several domestic situations. He dreams of being famous and actively scams on social media. He was arrested on September 20, 2024 for strangulation and kidnapping and is currently still in police custody.
- Brandon Poe – son of Sue Bob White; he was sentenced to 50 years for the attempted murder of Billy Hastings. He was released in 2021 and is now living in Ohio.
- Mousie White – eldest daughter of Mamie White; she is shown being released from prison and locating her estranged husband.
- Donald Maris White Jr. "Little Man" – Son of Mark White. Lives in Minnesota. Next in line to carry the family tradition of story telling and buck dancing.

== Production ==
The film, by Dickhouse Productions, was the first non-Jackass feature produced by Johnny Knoxville and Jeff Tremaine.

Knoxville had been a fan of Director Nitzberg's documentary about Hasil Adkins, and of The Beastly Bombing. Having seen Nitzberg's early footage of Jesco White, Knoxville and Nitzberg convinced Nitzberg to return to West Virginia, in order to film a feature around the rest of the White family. Nitzberg spent eighteen months with the notorious family of Jesco White, documenting their history as dancers, criminals and the impact of the coal mining culture upon them.

Shot cinéma vérité style, the film followed four generations of the White family as they flowed in and out of prison and scrambled to get by in rural West Virginia. The film also featured sequences featuring Jesco White tap dancing, accompanied by Hank Williams III.

== Critical response ==
The film debuted at the Tribeca Film Festival and was one of the first films distributed by Tribeca Film's distribution arm. It was an immediate success, knocking Best Picture Oscar winner, The Hurt Locker, from Amazon's top video-on-demand spot. It also aired on Showtime.

Upon release, Xeni Jardin of Boing Boing proclaimed it “a masterpiece.” Chris Morris in Variety said “Drinking, gas-huffing, drug dealing and drug-taking (and rehab), brawling, infidelity, armed robbery, attempted murder, incarceration and parole – it's all here. The Whites make Faulkner's Snopeses look like the Royal Family.” A.O. Scott in The New York Times reviewed it favorably, noting, “Its governing spirit, captured in the raucous music that punctuates the story (including songs performed live by Hank Williams III), is one of outlaw celebration. An anthology of country standards unfolds in real life and real time: murder ballads, cheating songs and rebel hollers, with an occasional pause for fatalistic spiritual meditation. One thing is certain, and is in a way the whole point of this fascinating and problematic documentary: The Whites don't care what you or anyone else thinks of them.”

On Rotten Tomatoes it has an approval rating of 56% based on reviews from 9 critics.

== Soundtrack ==
No.	Title	Music	Length
1.	"Simple Gifts"	Greg Herzenach & Al Wolovitch
2.	"D-Ray White"	Hank Williams III
3.	"Jessico"	The Kentucky Headhunters
4.	"Mama"	Deke Dickerson
5.	"Train to Nowhere"	Deke Dickerson
6.	"Cha Cha Cha-Ching!"	Phil Gough
7.	"Oh Dem Pills"	Deke Dickerson
8.	"Straight to Hell"	Hank Williams III
9.	"Theme of Violence"	Deke Dickerson
10.	"Party at My Pad"	Deke Dickerson
11.	"Happy Birthday"	Jesco and Mamie White
12.	"Lightning When I Need"	Five Horse Johnson
13.	"No Rules"	GG Allin
14.	"Whose Baby Are You, Baby?"	Deke Dickerson
15.	"Sorrow And Pain [Acoustic Mix]"	Deke Dickerson
16.	"West Virginia White Boy"	Deke Dickerson
17.	"Diggin’ It"	Deke Dickerson
18.	"I Love My Job"	Deke Dickerson
19.	"Mountain Lullaby"	Benedikt Brydern
20.	"Vinum Sabbathi"	Electric Wizard
21.	"Pine Tree"	Ponty’s Camper
22.	"Long Day"	Jay Hill and The Dirty Coal River Band
23.	"Hook and Line"	Ponty’s Camper
24.	"Darkness Breeds Contempt"	Deke Dickerson
25.	"Fortified Wine"	Deke Dickerson
26.	"Big Fat Woman Blues"	Voodoo Whiskey
27.	"Asphalt Aisle"	Deke Dickerson
28.	"Double Dealin’ Man"	Heather Marie Marsden and Phil Gough
29.	"P.F.F"	Hank Williams III
30.	"Wedding March"	Richard Hardelstein
31.	"Wedding March Recessional"	Felix Mendelssohn
32.	"Plague of Angels"	Earth
33.	"William Morgan"	John Haywood
34.	"Coal Miner’s Daughter"	Mamie White
35.	"Coda Maestoso in F (Flat) Minor"	Earth
36.	"Wild Wild Party"	Charlie Feathers
37.	"Sick, Sober, and Sorry"	Lefty Frizzell with Johnny Bond
38.	"Fugue for Two Guitars and Spoons"	Deke Dickerson
39.	"Moss on the Trees"	Deke Dickerson
40.	"Lonely Holler"	Deke Dickerson
41.	"Sorrow and Light"	Deke Dickerson
42.	"Mama [Instrumental Reprise]"	Deke Dickerson
43.	"Big Ass Happy Family"	Roger Alan Wade

== See also ==
- Jesco White
- D. Ray White
