= Jim Shelley (musician) =

American singer

Jim Shelley is an American multi-instrumentalist, singer-songwriter, producer, writer, painter, and former high school teacher. Since the release of his first album, 12 Songs in 1983, Shelley has usually recorded his albums in his home studio on a four or eight track tape machine, more often than not performing all the instrumental and vocal parts himself, though in recent years he has employed a full band on a number of occasions. Shelley's music encompasses elements of everything from first-wave Britpop, '60s garage rock, folk and country to punk, hard rock and metal to electronica to sound collage and extreme noise.

Shelley is a self-taught composer, producer, audio engineer, and guitarist, and plays other instruments as needed. He is a prolific writer, having released more than 500 songs on over forty records, most of them since 1989. He played a prominent role in the so-called lo-fi movement of the 1990s and early 2000s.

Shelley describes his teenage self as a "strange, lonely, outsider kid whose life was saved in the most extremely clichéd way by rock and roll, specifically The Beatles, Bob Dylan and the Velvet Underground." After high school, Shelley attended William and Mary, Bridgewater College, James Madison University, and the University of Virginia. Upon graduation, he was hired to teach English and coach football, basketball and golf at Luray High School in Luray, Virginia, where he met his wife, Mary Lou.

In 1986, he took a teaching and coaching position at Harrisonburg High School in Harrisonburg, Virginia. It was here that he met musicians from Dustin Bugg and Brian Temples, who would comprise the rhythm section for the initial version of Book of Kills.

Since 1994, Shelley has performed sporadically on the East Coast with various bands, including Book Of Proles (2005), agitprop The Karl Rove (2005-2006), The Plague Dogs (2008), Fear + Whiskey (2010-2013), and most notably the stylistically diverse Book Of Kills, the "live" version of which has featured a series of constantly changing line-ups from 1994 through 2022.

Early in 2010, Shelley disclosed on the "official" band web page, bookofkills.com, that he was disbanding Book Of Kills for the foreseeable future, if not for good, and on March 13, 2010, the group (at that moment featuring Shelley, bassist George Nipe III (his nephew) and drummer Mike Hicks) played one final time at the Little Grill Collective in Harrisonburg, Virginia, the venue where the initial version of BOK had delivered their debut show in 1994.

A month later, Shelley created a new group called Fear + Whiskey with bassist/vocalist Amy Bugg and drummer Jeff Lown (later replaced by Zack Simpson) that attempted to blend elements of country, folk, and old-time music with hard rock. That band apparently folded in the spring of 2013 after playing a dozen or so shows over the course of three years.

In 2012, Shelley published his autobiography, The Ballad Of Jim Shelley: My Life As A Failed Rock Star.

Shelley revealed in mid-2013 that he was practicing on occasion with former Book Of Kills members Casey and Jane Firkin, and George Nipe III with the intention of playing one or two (and possibly more) live shows. This group of musicians, along with drummer Pablo Olivieri of Shagwüf, had by the end of 2013 indeed played three well-received gigs, though by early 2014 they had disbanded without notice. Until 2022, Shelley made only two live appearances including one in late 2017 as Book of Kills with George Nipe III and drummer Garfield Banks.

Shelley continues to create new music and in July 2015 announced the creation of a "Book of Kills Single of the Month Club". Shelley released twelve compact disc e.p.'s over the next year. Most of the recordings on these singles were later compiled in a series of albums made available in 2017 and 2018.

In the summer of 2018, Shelley issued the "Archive Project" which consisted of most of his recorded output as well as an accompanying collection of rare photographs.

Shelley announced in late 2021 that he was practicing with “one final” version of Book of Kills with the intention of performing a few live shows in the latter half of 2022, the first in five years. Included in the band were former BOK members George Nipe III and Randy Simpson as well as drummer, Dan Tatro. In December 2022, Book of Kills performed in front of a standing room only crowd at Pale Fire in Harrisonburg, Virginia. This line-up apparently dissolved in mid-2025 after a handful of shows.

In addition to his own music, Shelley has released early albums by Blistre, Bill Bird, Bobby St. Ours of Hackensaw Boys fame, and Ian Ritchie & Bricklayer on his own label, Ain't Records. He produced three albums by the primal industrial blues band, Buck Gooter.

Shelley lives with his wife in Bridgewater, Virginia. He has two children, Christian and Daniel.

Former Alternative Press writer Jim Santos describes Shelley as "one of America's great unknown songwriters."

== Selected discography ==
- 12 Songs (1979)
- What I Did on My Summer Vacation (1983)
- Bloom Or Die (1989)
- For The Good of the Cause (1991)
- Don't Stop The Scream (1992)
- The Haunted Life (1992)
- Wee Jim's Blackeye (1993)
- Big Business Monkey, Volume One (1993)
- Songs for a Gone World (1994)
- Detritus (1994)
- Big Business Monkey, Volume Two (1994)
- Saint Judas (1995)
- Writing on the Wall - Big Business Monkey, Volume Three (1996)
- Splendid Trigger (1996)
- Nothing You Can Say (1997)
- So Far in Every Direction (1997)
- If I Should Fall (1998)
- Welcome To Concrete (1999)
- Songs – 1983–2000 (2000)
- E.P. (2001)
- Hoggett Heads (2002)
- All About You (2002)
- Wasp 51! (2003)
- Rockin' The Cheetah's Ass: Book Of Kills Live (2004)
- I Can't Give You Anything But Love (2005)
- The Monkeyclaus Sessions – The Karl Rove (2006)
- Monkeyclaus Plus – The Karl Rove (2006)
- Adventures Of An Inspired Amateur – Box Set (2006)
- Different (2007)
- The Plague Dogs (2008)
- This Is Your Book Of Kills (2008)
- Toward The Escape (2009)
- The Strange One - Big Business Monkey, Volume Four (2010)
- Bona Fide (2011)
- The Pleasures Of Saying Goodbye (2012)
- Psychic Diving (2012)
- Fear + Whiskey Anthology (2013)
- Riding The Echo Down (2014)
- Big Business Monkey, Volume Five (2015)
- Human Again (2015)
- I Roam The World Between & Three Others (2016)
- Filling in Holes - The Singles Club Remixes, Volume 1 (2016)
- How Beautiful Are We? - The Singles Club Remixes, Volume 2 (2016)
- Saluted and Defied - The Singles Club Remixes, Volume 3 (2017)
- Big Business Monkey, Volume Six (2018)
- The Archive Project (2018)
- Songs From 206 High Street - Big Business Monkey, Volume Seven (2019)
- I Know We Can Save Our World (2020)
- Every Dream Has Its Ghosts (2020)
- I'm Higher Than I'm Down (2021)
- Killing Time Again - Book of Kills Live 2008-2010 (2021)
- Army Of Loud (2021)
- The Monkey Claus E.P. + Outtakes & Live - The Karl Rove (2023)
- Accidental Skin (2024)
- I Cannot Do Otherwise, So I Will Lose My Mind (Big Business Monkey, Volume Nine) (2026)
- Sunset Gun (2026)

== Sources ==
- Alternative Press – issues 45, 49 and 61.
- "For The Good of the Cause" by Jim Santo for Jim Santo's DemoUniverse,
- "School House Rock" by Jennifer Holl for The Daily News-Record,
- "Teacher/Musician Loves Walking Around Bridgewater" by Jennifer Bonds for The Daily News-Record,
- "More Stuff" by Bryan Baker for Gajoob.com,
- "Under The Radar" by Rob Christensen for TapeOp Magazine,
- Bookofkills.com
