= Judson Mills =

American actor (born 1969)

- Occupation: Actor
- Years active: 1991–present
- Spouses: Christiaan Torrez (m. 1990; div. 1993) Julie Mills (m. 1997; div. 2002) Morgan Rae Mills (m. 2005)
- Children: 3

Judson Mills is an American actor. He is known for his performance as Texas Ranger Francis Gage in the American action drama television series Walker, Texas Ranger (1999–2001). Judson Mills joined the TV series in the second episode of Season 7 "Countdown" (together with Nia Peeples as his female partner Sydney Cooke). From 1991 to 1993, Mills performed as Alexander "Hutch" Hutchinson on As the World Turns. He also appeared on The X-Files and Disney's Mighty Joe Young as a supporting actor. Mills also appeared on episodes of Saving Grace as Ham's brother.

== Early life and education ==
Mills grew up in Northern Virginia. The house that he lived in was built by George Washington. The house is considered a national landmark.

Although Mills did not originally plan to become an actor, he later started involving himself in the theater. During his high school years he attended New Hampshire's private independent High Mowing School.

== Personal life ==
Mills has been married three times. First he was married to actress Christiaan Torrez on May 10, 1990. The couple was divorced in 1993. In 1997, he was married to Julie Mills, who gave birth to their son, Dalton Mills. Judson and Julie Mills were divorced five years later in 2002. On June 13, 2005, Judson Mills was married to Morgan Rae Mills, who then gave birth to their two sons Jagger Mills and Cash Mills. Mills's hobbies include hunting, fishing, football and Taekwondo.

== Filmography ==
Film
Year	Film	Role	Notes
1994	Confessions of a Sorority Girl	Joe	TV movie
1995	A Family Divided	Carter	TV movie
1996	Joyride	Redneck Joey	
1997	American Perfekt	Junior	
1997	T.N.T.	Maria	unknown character
1997	Surface to Air	Kuckler	
1998	Gods and Monsters	Young man at Pool	
1998	Major League: Back to the Minors	Hog Ellis	
1998	Babylon 5: Thirdspace	Delta Seven	TV movie
1998	Bury Me in Kern County	Dean	
1998	Zack and Reba	Wessy	
1998	Mighty Joe Young	Impatient Driver	
1999	Chill Factor	Dennis	
2001	See Jane Run	unknown character	
2002	The President's Man: A Line in the Sand	Deke Slater	TV movie
2003	Dismembered	Chick Evans	
2005	Walker, Texas Ranger: Trial by Fire	Francis Gage	TV movie
2006	Jesus, Mary and Joey	Taylor Gordan	
2010	Stacy's Mom	Richard	
2010	Bird Dog	Billy Banks	TV movie
2011	Carnal Innocence	Billy T Bonny	TV movie
2011	Rosewood Lane	Darren Summers	
Television
Year	Title	Role	Notes
1991–1993	As the World Turns	Alexander 'Hutch' Hutchinson	125 episodes
1994	Law & Order	Stephen Shaw	episode, "Breeder"
1994	Murder, She Wrote	Stu Yates/Toby Grant	1994–1996, 2 episodes
1995	Silk Stalkings	Todd Barnett	episode, "Partners (Part 1)"
1995	High Tide	Lenny Gibner	episode, "Natural Born Surfers"
1996	Sliders	Davy	episode, "Desert Storm"
1996	Renegade	Travis Taylor	2 episodes, 1996–1997
1997	Pacific Blue	Willie Hicks	episode, "Bad Company"
1997	Soldier of Fortune, Inc.	Staff Sgt. Eugene Hackin	2 episodes, 1997-1999
1997	JAG	Lieutenant Tim 'Spock' Vanderway	episode, "Jinx"
1998	NYPD Blue	John	episode, "Prostrate Before the Law"
1998	Promised Land	Kip	1 episode
1998	Beverly Hills, 90210	Security Guard	episode, "Confession"
1999-2001	Walker, Texas Ranger	Francis Gage	46 episodes
1999-2001	Search Party	Celebrity Contestant	3 episodes, 1999-2000
2000	The X-Files	Deputy Keith Wetzel	episode, "X-Cops"
2002	Crossing Jordan	Private Scott Weber	episode, "With Honor"
2002	JAG	Lieutenant Brad Reynolds	episode, "Dangerous Game"
2003	The Guardian	Pete Akins	episode, "Let's Spend the Night Together"
2005	CSI: Miami	Ty Radcliffe	episode, "Nothing to Lose"
2008	Saving Grace	Ralph 'Rafe' Dewey	2 episodes
2008	Bones	Nick Devito	episode, "The Passenger in the Oven"
2011–present	The Icarus II Project	Daniels	Currently airing
2012	Lab Rats	Beach Sheriff	episode, "Dude, Where's My Lab?"
2016	Notorious	Trinity	Episode: "Friends and Other Strangers"
