= Breaking Bear =

Adult animated television series

- Genre: Adult animation; Black comedy; Crime; Parody
- Created by: Julien Nitzberg
- Voices of: Brendan Fraser; Sarah Michelle Gellar; Annie Murphy; Elizabeth Hurley; Josh Gad; Chris Parnell; Chris Diamantopoulos; Harland Williams; Jackie Beat; Tony Plana; Matthew Lillard
- Opening theme: Ilan Rubin; Aaron Rubin
- Composers: Adam Damelin; Rocco Gagliese; Iain Gardner; Jeffery Elliott
- Countries of origin: United States; Canada
- Original language: English
- No. of seasons: 1
- No. of episodes: 8

Production
- Executive producers: Julien Nitzberg; Tom DeLonge; Stan Spry; Jeff Holland; Laurel Murphy; Lisa Olfman; Brendan Fraser; Sarah Michelle Gellar; Josh Gad
- Running time: 25 minutes
- Production companies: American Jenkem Arts; To The Stars Inc.; Evoke Entertainment; 9 Story Media Group (uncredited); Portfolio Entertainment (uncredited)

Original release
- Network: Tubi
- Release: July 24, 2026 – present

Breaking Bear is an adult animated dark comedy crime television series created by Julien Nitzberg for Tubi. Featuring the voices of Brendan Fraser, Sarah Michelle Gellar, Annie Murphy, Elizabeth Hurley and Josh Gad, it parodies mobster films and other crime fiction, including the television series Breaking Bad. The first season premiered on July 24, 2026, and the remaining episodes were released on July 31, 2026.

== Plot ==
A trio of grizzly bear siblings, Jer, Blair and Alistair, are kicked out of their home due to an oil company fracking their forest for oil, so they team up with a school teacher, Dwight Salter, to cook meth in order to raise enough money to save their home.

== Voice cast ==
- Brendan Fraser as Jer
- Sarah Michelle Gellar as Blair
- Annie Murphy as Tawny Chessman
- Elizabeth Hurley as The Wolf Queen
- Josh Gad as Alistair
- Chris Parnell as Dwight Salter
- Chris Diamantopoulos as Anchorman Kenneth
- Matthew Lillard as Wink Chessman

== Production ==
On August 15, 2022, Tubi announced a series order to the series.

In February 2024, it was announced that Portfolio Entertainment and 9 Story Media Group will be producing the series.

In May 2025, it was announced that Brendan Fraser, Sarah Michelle Gellar, Annie Murphy, Elizabeth Hurley, and Josh Gad had joined the show as main cast members.

== Episodes ==
| No. | Title | Original release date |
|---|---|---|
| 1 | "Bear-ly Legal" | July 24, 2026 |
| 2 | "Don't Get High on Your Own Supply" | July 24, 2026 |
| 3 | "Straight Outta Boone City" | July 31, 2026 |
| 4 | "Don't Furry, Be Happy" | July 31, 2026 |
| 5 | "The Right to Arm Bears" | July 31, 2026 |
| 6 | "It's Hammer Time" | July 31, 2026 |
| 7 | "A Serious Quality Control Problem" | July 31, 2026 |
| 8 | "The Ultimate Climax" | July 31, 2026 |
