= For the Love of a Glove =

- Music: Drew Erickson; Max Townsley; Nicole Morier
- Lyrics: Julien Nitzberg
- Book: Julien Nitzberg
- Premiere: 2020: Los Angeles, California

For the Love of a Glove: An Unauthorized Musical Fable About the Life of Michael Jackson as Told By His Glove is a musical about the life of Michael Jackson that premiered in 2020 in Los Angeles, California. The book and lyrics were written by Julien Nitzberg. The music was by Drew Erickson, Nicole Morier and Max Townsley.

== Overview ==
Many years earlier Nitzberg had been approached to write a television bio-pic of Michael Jackson for a cable network but had been stymied about how to find a creative way to address the bizarre and controversial parts of Michael Jackson's life, including the allegations of child abuse. Inspired by writers like Nikolai Gogol, the Theatre of the Absurd, Franz Kafka and Monty Python, Nitzberg decided to take a surrealist approach and have the story be told by Michael Jackson's glove. In his version of the story, the glove was one of five alien brothers who came to Earth to take the planet over and used the Jackson 5 to help achieve their goals. When the television network decided it only wanted to pursue a conventional bio-pic, he decided to tell the story as a stage musical instead.

The show utilized a mixture of puppets and actors to tell the story. The young Jackson 5 were played by life size puppets inspired by the Japanese Bunraku school of puppetry. The aliens were also portrayed by puppets. True to the Bunraku style, all of the puppeteers were visible and part of the show.

The first act of the musical focuses on the early years of the Jackson 5 at Motown. The second act centers on the year Michael Jackson recorded and released Thriller. Although the work was satirical in nature, Nitzberg explained to Forbes that he did not want to make fun of abuse or the allegations against Jackson. He told Forbes, "This is not an attack on Michael Jackson, that's the thing. Some people don't seem to understand that. We've entered this 'cancel culture' period where no-one has an idea of complexity. We need to get to a state of 'process culture' where we process who, or what, someone is and deal with it. There are lots of people who have made great music and done or been accused of doing bad or questionable things. If you started erasing anyone or anything with a question mark over it, significant chunks of the history of rock and roll would have to be gone. You can't ignore these question marks."

One of the major themes of the musical was exploring the effects of American racism and cultural appropriation on Michael Jackson. A central part of the story became what Nitzberg called the Amadeus/Salieri relationship between Michael Jackson and Donny Osmond. The Osmonds were considered by many to be a white knock off of the Jackson 5 and the Osmonds' early hit "One Bad Apple" sounded so much like a Jackson 5 song that Michael's mother Katherine Jackson thought it was the Jackson 5. The Osmonds also were Mormons who taught at that time that black people were cursed by the Mark of Cain. In the Mormon teachings all black people were descended from Cain. They taught that because Cain had killed Abel, God had punished him by turning him black. As a consequence of this curse, all blacks were barred from Mormon temples. Mormons also taught that the Mark of Cain would in the end of days be removed from black people and at this time they would turn white. This also became a major part of the musical being featured in Donny Osmond's song from the show "What a Delight When You Turn White." In the show, Michael Jackson's wish to turn white in his lifetime was explained as part of him wanting to get revenge on Donny Osmond. The story also put great emphasis on the trauma Michael Jackson suffered by being raised in the Jehovah's Witnesses denomination. It delved into the denomination's homophobic and sex negative teachings and how that may have scarred Jackson. Nitzberg explained, "Jehovah's Witnesses have a really fucked up attitude toward sexuality. They teach that masturbating can turn you gay because as a man you get used to a man's hand on your penis and want other men's hands on your penis. I thought this was hilarious. How did MJ get raised in this religion and then his most famous dance move winds up being him grabbing his own crotch? I then realized he didn't do the crotch grab, his alien glove forced him to do it!"

Nitzberg wrote the script and lyrics and also directed the show. The music in the show was completely original and was written by Nicole Morier, Drew Erickson and Max Townsley. Choreography was by Cris Judd and Bryan Anthony. Cris Judd was Michael Jackson's former lead dancer on the HIStory World Tour. It was the premiere production at the Carl Sagan and Ann Druyan Theater in Los Angeles.

== Critical response ==
Andrew Limbong on NPR's Weekend Edition called the show "Raunchy, surreal and absurd... While For the Love of a Glove isn't a hagiographic jukebox musical, it also isn't interested in tearing Michael Jackson down completely." In his interview with him, Nitzberg told NPR, "He's the King of Pop... And theater usually deals with flawed kings, flawed gods, etc."

On the theater review aggregator site Better Lemons it received a 93% positive rating. Stage Raw's Stephen Fife wrote, "Of course, the subject of Michael Jackson couldn't be more controversial, especially in the wake of HBO's documentary Leaving Neverland. All I can say (having written The 13th Boy, my own story of being sexually molested) is that Nitzberg has found a very clever way of raising the subject without in any way diminishing its importance." The LA Weekly's Nikki Kreuzer wrote, "Enter the wryly brilliant mind of Julien Nitzberg and his bizarre yet fantastical new musical For the Love of a Glove. Nitzberg takes the timeline of Jackson's life, based in well-documented music history, and expands the story into surreal absurdity even while consciously weaving in sociological, political and religious commentary... Part Peter Pan, part scathing social commentary, part music biography and a fully comedic audience experience, this is no children's puppet show! Suspend your disbelief, check your political correctness at the door and go see this off-the-wall show with an open mind while preparing yourself for a comical, culturally warped adventure."

Stage and Cinema's Marc Wheeler reviewed the show saying it was "a cleverly constructed, uproarious oddity that feeds our collective desire for catharsis through humor. The show, in all its absurdities, is a theatrical manifestation of our collective psyche in processing the unthinkable. One can't help but appreciate the profound genius in staging a show of such outrageous cosmic conceit." Dangerous Minds' Howie Pyro wrote, "In these days of modern mass paranoia and casual racism, over-sensitivity and dumbing down of all things, even I had a flash of looking behind me (as I saw others do) and wondering if this was cool to like, who was getting offended, who was laughing, and right then at that moment I realized I have been way more affected by all this modern bullshit than I thought. We need people like Julien Nitzberg to remind and instill in us that it is not only okay, but quite necessary to think, laugh (at ourselves AND at others) and learn." The Compton Herald's K. Gerard Thomas and Denise Thomas wrote, "This is a raw, unapologetic, ala Mel Brooks, immensely funny view of Michael Jackson's life, told from the perspective of his best friend – the iconic silver glove. Theater-goers will definitely have something to discuss afterwards as the play seeks to push the audience's sensibilities to and fro – one moment enamored with Jackson, another perplexed by him. It truly reflects what fans felt about his intriguing life."

The show suspended its initial run due to the coronavirus pandemic then later reopened on February 25, 2023.

== Controversy ==
Early on in the production there were rumors in the media actor Johnny Depp was involved in the show. Creator Julien Nitzberg said in an interview "Sam Sarkar, who's the CEO of Infinitum Nihil, which is Johnny's company, is a producer on this. That's how that whole thing began. Suddenly there were headlines saying that Johnny Depp was playing Michael Jackson. No-one called even to interview me and asked what the story was, but suddenly Italian newspapers were saying it's a movie that's coming out with Johnny as Michael. It was insane."
