= "Hope" is the thing with feathers =

Lyric poem by Emily Dickinson

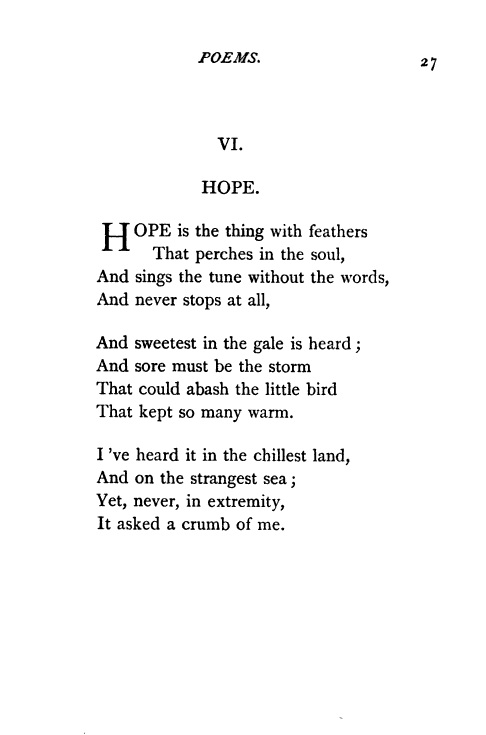
The poem was published posthumously as "Hope" in 1891.

"'Hope' is the thing with feathers" is a lyric poem in ballad meter by American poet Emily Dickinson. The poem's manuscript appears in Fascicle 13, which Dickinson compiled around 1861. It is one of 19 poems in the collection. Dickinson's poem "There's a certain Slant of light" is also in this collection. With the discovery of Fascicle 13 after Dickinson's death by her sister, Lavinia Dickinson, "'Hope' is the thing with feathers" was published in 1891 in a collection of her works under the title Poems, which was edited and published by Thomas Wentworth Higginson and Mabel Loomis Todd.

== History of publication ==
"'Hope' is the thing with feathers" was first compiled in one of Dickinson's hand-sewn fascicles, which was written during and put together in 1861. In the 1999 edition of The Poems of Emily Dickinson: Reading Edition, R. W. Franklin changed the year of appearance from 1861, where the holograph manuscript exists, to 1862. According to the appendix, Dickinson wrote 227 poems, numbered 272 to 498, in 1862, the third-most she wrote in a single year between 1860 and 1865. The edition that Dickinson included in the fascicle was text B, according to Franklin. No current holograph manuscript exists of the poem's first written version. "'Hope' is the thing with feathers" first appeared in print in Poems by Emily Dickinson, Second Series in 1891. It was published by Roberts Brothers in Boston.

In 1955, Thomas H. Johnson reassessed and transcribed Dickinson's poems, producing the first scholarly collection of her work. Johnson's transcription of her works from her fascicles was taken from their earliest fair copies. In Johnson's collection, "'Hope' is the thing with feathers" is poem number 254. Franklin's edition used the last fair copies. It is number 314 in his collection and is so labeled in The Norton Anthology of Poetry.

Close transcription

"Hope" is the thing with feathers —
That perches in the soul —
And sings the tune without the words —
And never stops — at all —
And sweetest — in the Gale — is heard —
And sore must be the storm —
That could abash the little Bird
That kept so many warm —
I've heard it in the chillest land —
And on the strangest Sea —
Yet — never — in Extremity,
It asked a crumb — of me.

First published version

HOPE.

"Hope" is the thing with feathers
That perches in the soul,
And sings the tune without the words,
And never stops at all,

And sweetest in the Gale is heard;
And sore must be the storm
That could abash the little bird
That kept so many warm.

I 've heard it in the chillest land,
And on the strangest sea;
Yet, never, in extremity,
It asked a crumb of me.

=== Fascicle 13 ===
Fascicle 13 is the bound edition of Dickinson's written poetry that contains "'Hope' is the thing with feathers" in her hand. Franklin found similarities in the materials used for this fascicle and Fascicles 9, and 11–14. Fascicle 13's distinctive markers include a woven style of stationery, with paper that is cream in appearance with a blue rule line on it. It also is decorated in an embossed style that frames the page with "a queen's head above the letter 'L'". Harvard University's Houghton Library houses the holograph manuscript.

== Analysis ==
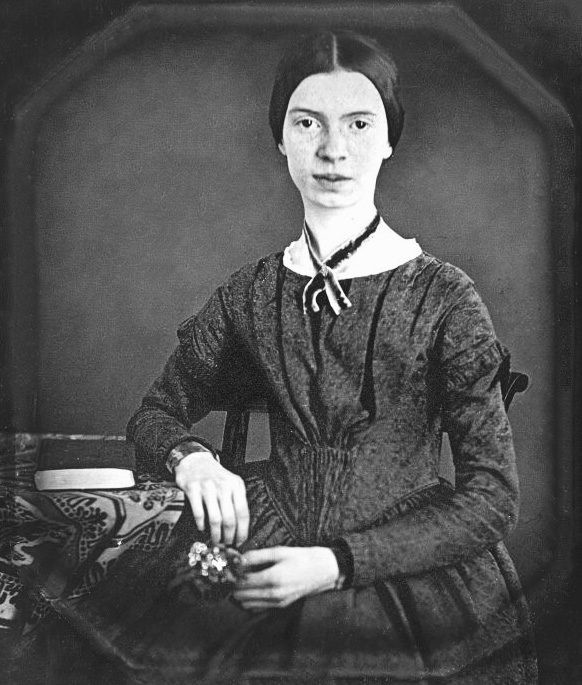
Daguerreotype of Emily Dickinson, taken in 1848 while she attended Mount Holyoke Seminary

According to literary critic Helen Vendler, the poem's opening foot is "reversed", adding more color and emphasis on the word "Hope". Dickinson uses iambic meter throughout the poem to replicate that of "Hope's song through time". Most of Dickinson's poetry contains quatrains and runs in a hymnal meter, which maintains the rhythm of alternating between four beats and three beats during each stanza. "'Hope' is the thing with feathers" is broken into three stanzas, each containing alternating lines of iambic tetrameter and iambic trimeter, totaling 12 lines.

=== Form ===
Victoria N. Morgan writes in her book Emily Dickinson and Hymn Culture: Tradition and Experience that Dickinson's poetry may have been influenced by 18th-century hymn culture, such as Isaac Watts and hymnal writers Phoebe Hinsdale Brown and Eliza Lee Follen. Morgan postulates that their works were introduced to Dickinson early in her life, when she attended church regularly. Morgan believes that the "simplicity" of the hymnal form allowed Dickinson to make this "an easy target for parody".

=== Theme of poem ===
The poem calls upon the imagery of seafaring adventures with the use of the words "Sea" and "Gale". Dickinson uses the metaphor of hope as a bird that does not disappear when it encounters hardships or "storms". Vendler writes that Dickinson enjoys "the stimulus of teasing riddles", as seen when she plays with the idea of hope as a bird. Dickinson alludes to hope as something that does not disappear when the "Gale" and "storm" get worse and whose song persists despite the intensity of whatever is attempting to unseat it. She also says that no matter what the speaker of the poem is doing, hope does not leave even if they offer nothing in return to it.

=== Punctuation ===
Dickinson uses dashes liberally in the poem, ending nine lines with them. She also capitalized common nouns, such as "Hope," "Bird," and "Extremity." Scholar Ena Jung writes that Dickinson's dashes are among the most "widely contested diacriticals" in contemporary literary discussions. In his Poetry Handbook, John Lennard writes that Dickinson's poems rely heavily on her use of dashes, capitalization, and line and stanza breaks. He says her "intense, [and] unexpected play" with capitalization and dashes makes her poetry "memorable". Read aloud, the dashes create caesura, giving the poem a staccato rhythm. Jung says Dickinson's use of dashes creates a "visible breath" for the speaker of the poetry.

=== Symbolism ===
Dickinson describes hope as a bird, a metaphor for salvation. She has nine variations of the word "hope," which can be interpreted in multiple ways. Morgan writes that Dickinson often writes about birds when describing acts of worship, which coincides with the format of the hymn. Birds in Christian iconography are often doves. Dickinson often alludes to nature in her poems. In this poem, the bird and the violent weather create a balance between the destructive and the beneficent. The poem also juxtaposes the interior and exterior worlds, with the soul interior and the storms exterior.

== Critical reception ==
Dickinson's poems are considered mysterious and enigmatic and typically have a volta, or turn in topic, at the end, as in "Because I could not stop for Death". "'Hope' is the thing with feathers" has a similar quality, but some critics consider it childlike in its simplicity. Vendler notes that Dickinson's quatrains and hymnal meter can be seen as simplistic. Morgan argues that because of Dickinson's "antagonistic relation" with 19th-century Christianity, the poet gives a "reassessment of spirituality" through this poem with the image of the bird and the Christian conception of "hope."

== Derivative works ==
"'Hope' is the thing with feathers" has been set to music many times. One musical adaptation is Susan LaBarr's, for women's choir and piano. Other musical settings are by Robert Sieving, Emma Lou Diemer, Paul Kelly, David Bednall, and Christopher Tin.

The alternative country band Trailer Bride's final album is Hope Is a Thing with Feathers, a variant of the poem's first line. The album's title track is an adaptation of the poem and Dickinson receives a writing credit.
