= Common Sense (band) =

American reggae band

Common Sense is an American reggae band from Orange County, California. Since their formation in 1987, they have released five albums under their own label, Common Sense Records. They have also released an album under the Virgin label, Psychedelic Surf Groove. Their song "Never Give Up" was used in the movie Speed 2: Cruise Control and "In Your Eyes" was in the movie Kingpin. They have toured the US and Mexico and perform periodically at the Belly Up Tavern in Solana Beach, California, and at various music halls around California including the Coach House Concert Hall in San Juan Capistrano. They have, in the past, been members of the summer music and sports festival, Warped Tour and Willie Nelson's Farm Aid.

The band is also known for making the Chicago hip hop emcee Common Sense condense his name to simply Common because of legal issues.

The band's sixth album was released in 2013.

== Band members ==
- Nick Hernandez – vocals and ukulele
- Mikey Ortiz - bass guitar
- Billy Sherman – guitar/keyboard
- Phil Gough - guitar
- Tracy Sledge – drums, percussion

== Former members ==
- Jai Vatuk – guitar/keyboard
- Steve Dillard – trumpet/flugelhorn/and Nick's Daddy
- Drew Hester - drums
- Larry Young - Bass Guitar
- Cliff Rehrig - bass guitar

== Discography ==
Full-length albums:

- Live! At the Belly Up Tavern (1994)
- Psychedelic Surf Groove (1996)
- State of the Nation (1999)
- Common Sense (2002)
- Don't Look Back (2005)
- What's It All About (2013)
- I'm in the Mood (2019)
