= Trailer Bride (album) =

Studio album by Trailer Bride
- Released: April 22, 1997
- Genre: Alternative Country
- Length: 43:13
- Label: Yep Roc

Trailer Bride chronology
Trailer Bride (1997)	Smelling Salts (1998)

Trailer Bride is the self-titled debut album by the alternative country band Trailer Bride, released in 1997.

== Critical reception ==
Professional ratings
Review scores
Source	Rating
AllMusic	4/5 stars

No Depression praised the album, writing that it "shows off some spiffy guitar and harmonica playing, and some ear-catching vocals, and some deceptively simple, almost loopy lyrics that hide pretty powerful insights."

== Track listing ==
All songs written by Melissa Swingle.

1. "Sorry Times" - 3:11
2. "Mardi Gras" - 3:32
3. "Let Mama Drive" - 3:32
4. "Rouge" - 2:53
5. "Arrowheads" - 4:20
6. "Road to Canaan" - 3:14
7. "Trailer Bride" - 3:43
8. "Maudlin" - 3:07
9. "Landyacht Take Me Home" - 2:35
10. "Chatham Co. Militia" - 2:57
11. "Sway" - 2:57
12. "Flying Saucer" - 2:55
13. "Train at Night" - 4:17

== Personnel ==
- Brad Goolsby - drums
- Melissa Swingle - vocals, guitars (acoustic, electric, & slide), harmonica, organ, saw
- Robert Mitchener - bass

=== Additional personnel ===
- Mike Beard - Jew's-Harp, tambourine
- Bryon Settle - guitar, shaker
- Joanne Ramsey - background vocals
