= Jacob Young (documentarian) =

American filmmaker

- Born: 1952 (age 73–74); West Virginia
- Occupations: Screenwriter; Cinematographer; Film editor Filmmaker
- Known for: Documentary films

Jacob Young (born 1952) is an American screenwriter, cinematographer, film editor, and filmmaker best known for creating documentary films that explore eccentric people living in his native Appalachia.

== Career ==
Young was a producer at WNPB-TV in Morgantown, West Virginia, when he conceived Appalachian Junkumentary (1986), a film eventually purchased by over 90 PBS stations and winning a 1988 PBS Special Achievement Award. It became one of 15 U.S. television shows later selected for an international screening conference. Young was also producer for two seasons of the documentary series Different Drummer, broadcast by the BBC and Public TV. His film Dancing Outlaw (1992) received both a 1992 Emmy Award and a 1993 American Film Institute Award for 'Best Documentary. In 1998 Young revealed that he was considering creating a feature film using Dancing Outlaw star Jesco White.

== Filmography ==
- Saturday Night in Babylon (1983) — A look at reggae music and culture through the eyes of Jamaican migrant workers, originally broadcast in 1983 on the television series Vandalia Sampler.
- Appalachian Junkumentary (1987) — In which Appalachian junkyard owners explain their business, their hopes and their dreams. Originally broadcast on the PBS television series Different Drummer.
- Hammer on the Slammer (1987) — The tale of Donald Bordenkircher, who reestablished several West Virginia state prisons that were operating on the verge of disaster. Originally broadcast on the PBS television series Different Drummer.
- Amazing Delores (1988) — The biograph of Delores Boyd, a grandmother who writes outrageous songs and fronts a rock and roll band. Originally broadcast on the PBS television series Different Drummer.
- Point Man For God (1989) — About Bernard Coffindaffer, a rich industrialist who mounts a crusade to cover the American landscape with crosses. Originally broadcast on the PBS television series Different Drummer.
- Glitch in the System (1989) — Elmer Fike, former owner and plant manager of a small chemical company in Nitro, West Virginia, and an opponent of government regulations, which leads him into battle with the Environmental Protection Agency. Originally broadcast on the PBS television series Different Drummer.
- Doctor No? (1990) — A portrait of Dr. William Pierce, the author of The Turner Diaries and one of the country's preeminent white supremacists. Originally broadcast on the PBS television series Different Drummer.
- Mister D...Period (1991) — About James E. "Sug" Davis, an artist in Charleston, West Virginia, an artist who creates things out of found materials. Originally broadcast on the PBS television series Different Drummer.
- Dancing Outlaw (1992) — Portrait of Jesco White, a man struggling to live up to his father's legacy as the finest dancer in the Appalachian Mountains. Originally broadcast on the PBS television series Different Drummer.
- Fleabag : the Frank Veltri story (1992) — Although operating at a substantial loss, a man refuses to close an old hotel that houses the helpless and destitute. Originally broadcast on the PBS television series Different Drummer.
- Dancing Outlaw II: Jesco Goes to Hollywood (1994) — Jesco, the Dancing Outlaw, becomes so famous that he is summoned to Hollywood to appear on Roseanne.
- Holy Cow, Swami! (1996) — Examines the life of the powerful Hare Krishna Kirtanananda Swami and uncovers murder, kidnapping, and extensive fraud.
- American Breakdown (1997) — Made for commercial broadcast, this was a pilot for a reality-based series featuring interviews of interesting people stranded by the highway in urban and rural Tennessee, originally premiered 10/26/98 on the television show Split screen.
- The Object - the Urim and Thummim (2007)

== Recognition ==
Oxford American referred to Young's film Dancing Outlaw as "now-legendary", and wrote that it was "one of the most bizarre, upsetting, and ultimately, when looked at from a certain angle, inspiring documentaries to have emerged from the South, or from anywhere, in recent memory."

In writing of a 1999 retrospective of Young's works, which included Dancing Outlaw, Dancing Outlaw 2, "and a sizable chunk of Young's documentary oeuvre", the Austin American-Statesman wrote "Young's specialty is fixing his camera on the quirky human" and called his work "life-is-nuttier-than-fiction films".

=== Awards and nominations ===
- 1988, PBS Special Achievement Award for Appalachian Junkumentary
- 1992, Emmy Award for 'Best Documentary' for Dancing Outlaw
- 1993, American Film Institute Award for 'Best Documentary' for Dancing Outlaw
