= Phil Gough =

American singer-songwriter

- Born: Philip Gough
- Genres: Ska, jazz, reggae, alternative rock, dub
- Occupations: Guitarist, composer, songwriter
- Instruments: Guitar, vocals
- Years active: 1986–present
- Website: philgough.com

Philip Gough is a guitarist, singer-songwriter, film score composer, music producer and engineer. Phil has played in the bands, Novacaine (1996–1997), Bow Wow Wow (1999–2009), English Beat (2014), Common Sense (2001–present). As a composer Gough has scored several films and television programs, most notably writing the theme for Gene Simmons: Family Jewels.

== Television ==
- Gene Simmons Family Jewels – (Music composer: Title theme – 57 episodes – 2006–2009)
- Female Forces (TV series – Music composer – 2008)

== Filmography ==
- Red Meat (Music composer: additional music – 1997)
- Face the Music (Music composer – 2000)
- Cement (Music composer: additional music – 2000)
- Auto Focus (Music composer: additional music – 2002)
- The Revolting Dead (Music composer: additional music – 2003)
- Yeti Vengeance (Music composer – 2004)
- Funny Money (composer: additional music – 2008)
- The Wild and Wonderful Whites of West Virginia (composer: additional music – 2009)
