= Julien Nitzberg =

American film director

- Born: 1965 (age 60–61); The Bronx, New York, U.S.
- Occupations: Screenwriter, theater director, film director

Julien Nitzberg (born 1965) is an American screenwriter, stage writer, lyricist, theater director and film director, best known in the film world as the director of the documentary The Wild and Wonderful Whites of West Virginia. In the theater world, Nitzberg is best known for writing the book and lyrics for two musicals. His first musical was "The Beastly Bombing or A Terrible Tale of Terrorists Tamed by the Tangles of True Love." Nitzberg wrote the book and lyrics and directed this musical in Los Angeles and New York. The Beastly Bombing won the LA Weekly Theater Award for Best Musical of the Year. His second musical was "For the Love of a Glove: An Unauthorized Musical Fable About the Life of Michael Jackson As Told By His Glove."

== Early life ==
Nitzberg was born and raised in The Bronx. His mother was an Austrian Holocaust survivor; his maternal grandfather was conductor and composer Hans Knauer, who had studied under Franz Lehár and who had conducted the premiere of Lehar's opera Eva before Austrian emperor Franz Josef.

As a child, Nitzberg spent three years living in Great Britain and Vienna. Upon returning to America, he attended the Horace Mann School in New York City.

At age 16, Nitzberg became a founding member and guitarist of the notorious Lower East Side hardcore punk band Artless. They frequently played with Minor Threat, Swans, Flipper and other prominent punk bands. Mykel Board was their lead singer. Darryl Jenifer of the Bad Brains was Artless' second guitarist. Nitzberg was known for antagonizing and getting into fights with skinhead members of the audience. Artless' self-titled first album was produced by Dr. Know of the Bad Brains. The band broke up when Nitzberg left New York City to attend college. He took one year off from college during which he drove a New York City yellow cab.

== Career ==
=== The Wild World of Hasil Adkins (1993) ===
After college, Nitzberg moved to the Appalachian Mountains, where he was hired at the media collective Appalshop Films. While working there he directed his first documentary The Wild World of Hasil Adkins, One Man Band And Inventor of the Hunch for PBS' Headwaters TV series.

Known for composing songs about decapitation, abnormal sex and commodity meats, Hasil Adkins created in the 1950s a bizarre original form of rockabilly, later dubbed "psychobilly" and was a major influence on punk bands including The Cramps who covered his song "She Said". During the filming, Adkins suffered a nervous breakdown and threatened to "kill and kick" Nitzberg, delaying the film's completion for over a year. Nitzberg had to persevere through these death threats and other psychotic episodes from Adkins, in order to finally capture the life story of a performer known just as much for his drunkenness, unpredictability and frequent arrests as for his unique music.

During the filming of the Adkins documentary, Nitzberg encountered the legendary mountain dancing White Family, whom he documented in The Wild and Wonderful Whites of West Virginia. He met Mamie White in 1989 while shooting an Adkins concert; during the concert, a three-woman fight broke out which Mamie White broke up while tripping on acid. Mamie insisted that Nitzberg come meet her tap-dancing brother Jesco White at her birthday party where she promised Nitzberg that she would have a birthday cake with an image of woman's breasts and genitals on it.

He went to her rural trailer and was intrigued by the White family. He returned the following week to film the first footage of Jesco and Mamie White. This footage became the basis of the Emmy Award-winning documentary Dancing Outlaw, on which Nitzberg served as associate producer and sound man. This footage was later released as a bonus track on The Wild and Wonderful Whites of West Virginia DVD.

=== Bury Me in Kern County and Early Work in Hollywood ===
After finishing filming The Wild World of Hasil Adkins, Nitzberg moved to California to attend the MFA program of the California Institute of the Arts, studying under Alexander Mackendrick, director of The Ladykillers and Sweet Smell of Success. Nitzberg wrote and filmed his first feature film, Bury Me in Kern County, a "white trash black comedy" set in the mid-eighties, as part of his studies. It featured the debut of Mary Lynn Rajskub; the soundtrack was produced by the Dust Brothers and included songs by The Muffs, Beck, C.C. DeVille, Dub Narcotic Sound System, The Upper Crust and Sukia (band). Bury Me in Kern County debuted at the South by Southwest Film Festival in Austin, Texas. It was dubbed one of the "buzz films" of the festival by the Austin American-Statesman. Godfrey Cheshire in Variety raved about the film calling it "an impressively assured and pro debut", as well as declaring that "it's reassuring that original, fiercely committed indie satires like this one are still emerging." Bury Me in Kern County toured the festival circuit, receiving acclaim at such varied festivals as Montreal, Palm Springs, New York Underground and Chicago Underground. Entering the world of Hollywood, Nitzberg became a successful screenwriter, writing for HBO, SHOWTIME, TNT, VH1 and NBC.

=== The Beastly Bombing (2006) ===
In 2006, Nitzberg wrote the book and lyrics for the controversial musical The Beastly Bombing or A Terrible Tale of Terrorists Tamed by the Tangles of True Love, which he also directed. The music was written by composer Roger Neill, who also acted as co-producer and music director. The Beastly Bombing was inspired by such works of Gilbert and Sullivan as The Pirates of Penzance, Nitzberg decided to craft a plot revolving around lovable terrorists, portraying them in the same spirit as Gilbert and Sullivan's lovable pirates. The Beastly Bombing told the story of two Al Qaeda terrorists who show up in New York to blow up the Brooklyn Bridge. Getting to the bridge they discover two Timothy McVeigh-inspired white supremacists who have shown up at the same time with the same plan. The terrorists despise each other at first but then, in song, eventually discover a mutual hatred of Jews and bond before being forced to disguise themselves as Hasidic Jews to escape capture by the police. On the run, they fall in love with two girls who turn out to be the president's daughters who have escaped from rehab.

The Beastly Bombing drew comparison to Mel Brooks and was dubbed by The Huffington Post: "the first great work of comedy to emerge from the post-9/11 little planet of horrors." The play also had its detractors. Stephen Schwartz, the composer of Wicked and Godspell, called The Beastly Bombing "the most offensive and morally unredeemable musical I've ever heard."

The show became a sellout cult hit attracting celebrities including Diane von Furstenberg, John C. Reilly, Spike Jonze, Paul Reiser, Stephen Gaghan and Liev Schreiber. At the prestigious LA Weekly Theater Awards, The Beastly Bombing won the Musical of the Year Award. After playing over a year in Los Angeles, The Beastly Bombing was staged in New York, Chicago and Amsterdam.

=== The Wild and Wonderful Whites of West Virginia (2009) ===
Nitzberg next directed the documentary The Wild and Wonderful Whites of West Virginia for Dickhouse Productions. This film was the first non-Jackass feature produced by Johnny Knoxville and Jeff Tremaine. Knoxville had been a fan of Nitzberg's documentary about Hasil Adkins, and of The Beastly Bombing. Having seen Nitzberg's early footage of Jesco White, Knoxville and Nitzberg convinced Nitzberg to return to West Virginia, in order to film a feature around the rest of the White family. Nitzberg spent eighteen months with the notorious family of Jesco White, documenting their history as dancers, criminals and the impact of the coal mining culture upon them. Shot cinéma vérité style, the film followed four generations of the White family as they flowed in and out of prison and scrambled to get by in rural West Virginia. The film also featured sequences featuring Jesco White tap dancing, accompanied by Hank Williams III.

The film debuted at the Tribeca Film Festival and was one of the first films distributed by Tribeca Film's distribution arm. It was an immediate success, knocking Best Picture Oscar winner, The Hurt Locker, from Amazon's top video-on-demand spot. It also aired on Showtime. Upon release, Xeni Jardin of Boing Boing proclaimed it "a masterpiece". Chris Morris in Variety said "Drinking, gas-huffing, drug dealing and drug-taking (and rehab), brawling, infidelity, armed robbery, attempted murder, incarceration and parole -- it's all here. The Whites make Faulkner's Snopeses look like the Royal Family." A.O. Scott in The New York Times reviewed it favorably, noting, "Its governing spirit, captured in the raucous music that punctuates the story (including songs performed live by Hank Williams III), is one of outlaw celebration. An anthology of country standards unfolds in real life and real time: murder ballads, cheating songs and rebel hollers, with an occasional pause for fatalistic spiritual meditation. One thing is certain, and is in a way the whole point of this fascinating and problematic documentary: The Whites don't care what you or anyone else thinks of them."

=== For the Love of a Glove (2020) ===
In 2020, Nitzberg premiered the musical "For the Love of a Glove: An Unauthorized Musical Fable About the Life of Michael Jackson As Told By His Glove" in Los Angeles, California.

Many years earlier Nitzberg had been approached to write a television bio-pic of Michael Jackson for a cable network but had been stymied about how to find a creative way to address the bizarre and controversial parts of Michael Jackson's life, including the allegations of child abuse. Inspired by writers like Nikolai Gogol, the Theatre of the Absurd, Franz Kafka and Monty Python, Nitzberg decided to take a surrealist approach and have the story be told by Michael Jackson's glove. In his version of the story, the glove was one of five alien brothers who came to Earth to take the planet over and used the Jackson 5 to help achieve their goals. When the television network decided it only wanted to pursue a conventional bio-pic, he decided to tell the story as a stage musical instead.

The show utilized a mixture of puppets and actors to tell the story. The young Jackson 5 were played by life size puppets inspired by the Japanese Bunraku school of puppetry. The aliens were also portrayed by puppets. True to the Bunraku style, all of the puppeteers were visible and part of the show.

The first act of the musical focused on the early years of the Jackson 5 at Motown. The second act centered on the year Michael Jackson recorded and released Thriller. Although the work was satirical in nature, Nitzberg explained to Forbes that he did not want to make fun of abuse or the allegations against Jackson. He told Forbes, "This is not an attack on Michael Jackson, that's the thing. Some people don't seem to understand that. We've entered this 'cancel culture' period where no-one has an idea of complexity. We need to get to a state of 'process culture' where we process who, or what, someone is and deal with it. There are lots of people who have made great music and done or been accused of doing bad or questionable things. If you started erasing anyone or anything with a question mark over it, significant chunks of the history of rock and roll would have to be gone. You can't ignore these question marks."

Andrew Limbong on NPR's Weekend Edition called the show "Raunchy, surreal and absurd... While For the Love of a Glove isn't a hagiographic jukebox musical, it also isn't interested in tearing Michael Jackson down completely." In his interview with him, Nitzberg told NPR, "He's the King of Pop... And theater usually deals with flawed kings, flawed gods, etc."

One of the major themes of the musical was exploring the effects of American racism and cultural appropriation on Michael Jackson. A central part of the story became what Nitzberg called the Amadeus/Salieri relationship between Michael Jackson and Donny Osmond. The Osmonds were considered by many to be a white knock off of the Jackson 5 and the Osmonds' early hit "One Bad Apple" sounded so much like a Jackson 5 song that Michael's mother Katherine Jackson thought it was the Jackson 5. The Osmonds also were Mormons who taught at that time that black people were cursed by the Mark of Cain. In the Mormon teachings all black people were descended from Cain. They taught that because Cain had killed Abel, God had punished him by turning him black. As a consequence of this curse, all blacks were barred from Mormon temples. Mormons also taught that the Mark of Cain would in the end of days be removed from black people and at this time they would turn white. This also became a major part of the musical being featured in Donny Osmond's song from the show "What a Delight When You Turn White". In the show, Michael Jackson's wish to turn white in his lifetime was explained as part of him wanting to get revenge on Donny Osmond. The story also put great emphasis on the trauma Michael Jackson suffered by being raised in the Jehovah's Witnesses denomination. It delved into the denomination's homophobic and sex negative teachings and how that may have scarred Jackson. Nitzberg explained, "Jehovah's Witnesses have a really fucked up attitude toward sexuality. They teach that masturbating can turn you gay because as a man you get used to a man's hand on your penis and want other men's hands on your penis. I thought this was hilarious. How did MJ get raised in this religion and then his most famous dance move winds up being him grabbing his own crotch? I then realized he didn't do the crotch grab, his alien glove forced him to do it!"

Nitzberg wrote the script and lyrics and also directed the show. The music in the show was completely original and was written by Nicole Morier, Drew Erickson and Max Townsley. Choreography was by Cris Judd and Bryan Anthony. Cris Judd was Michael Jackson's former lead dancer on the HIStory World Tour. It was the premiere production at the Carl Sagan and Ann Druyan Theater in Los Angeles.

All the reviews were positive. On the theater review aggregator site Better Lemons it received a 93% positive rating. Stage Raw's Stephen Fife wrote, "Of course, the subject of Michael Jackson couldn't be more controversial, especially in the wake of HBO's documentary Leaving Neverland. All I can say (having written The 13th Boy, my own story of being sexually molested) is that Nitzberg has found a very clever way of raising the subject without in any way diminishing its importance." The LA Weekly's Nikki Kreuzer wrote, "Enter the wryly brilliant mind of Julien Nitzberg and his bizarre yet fantastical new musical For the Love of a Glove. Nitzberg takes the timeline of Jackson's life, based in well-documented music history, and expands the story into surreal absurdity even while consciously weaving in sociological, political and religious commentary... Part Peter Pan, part scathing social commentary, part music biography and a fully comedic audience experience, this is no children's puppet show! Suspend your disbelief, check your political correctness at the door and go see this off-the-wall show with an open mind while preparing yourself for a comical, culturally warped adventure."

Stage and Cinema's Marc Wheeler reviewed the show saying it was "a cleverly constructed, uproarious oddity that feeds our collective desire for catharsis through humor. The show, in all its absurdities, is a theatrical manifestation of our collective psyche in processing the unthinkable. One can't help but appreciate the profound genius in staging a show of such outrageous cosmic conceit." Dangerous Minds' Howie Pyro wrote, "In these days of modern mass paranoia and casual racism, over-sensitivity and dumbing down of all things, even I had a flash of looking behind me (as I saw others do) and wondering if this was cool to like, who was getting offended, who was laughing, and right then at that moment I realized I have been way more affected by all this modern bullshit than I thought. We need people like Julien Nitzberg to remind and instill in us that it is not only okay, but quite necessary to think, laugh (at ourselves AND at others) and learn." The Compton Herald's K. Gerard Thomas and Denise Thomas wrote, "This is a raw, unapologetic, ala Mel Brooks, immensely funny view of Michael Jackson's life, told from the perspective of his best friend – the iconic silver glove. Theater-goers will definitely have something to discuss afterwards as the play seeks to push the audience's sensibilities to and fro – one moment enamored with Jackson, another perplexed by him. It truly reflects what fans felt about his intriguing life."

The show suspended its successful run because of the coronavirus pandemic.

=== Other projects ===
In 2007, Nitzberg wrote the script Sputnik Monroe for HBO Films. The script was based on his time spent with Monroe, a white professional wrestler who used his popularity to force sporting arenas throughout the South to integrate.

He also sold a pilot to HBO called The Tribe about "a family of contemporary Hasidic and secular Jewish criminals inspired by a number of weird true cases." This was co-written with The Devil and Daniel Johnston director Jeff Feuerzeig. Feuerzeig and Nitzberg also co-wrote God Bless Tiny Tim. This portrait of the singer and accidental cultural icon was developed for Johnny Depp's company Infinitum Nihil.

In 2011, Nitzberg sold a pilot to the USA Network based on This American Life contributor David Ellis Dickerson's memoir about working at Hallmark Greeting Cards. It was called House of Cards (no connection with the TV series starring Kevin Spacey).

In 2012 Nitzberg directed the Ashton Kutcher-produced documentary Patton Oswalt: To Be Loved & Understood, which dealt with the struggles of comedian Patton Oswalt with depression, and how that struggle impacted his unique brand of comedy.

Nitzberg has written for a number of magazines. He conducted the first ever interview with Unabomber Ted Kaczynski, which was published in the Feral House book Technological Slavery. He also has directed music videos for a number of bands including King Missile, Beat Happening, and Monotonix.

In 2017, Nitzberg was hired as a writer and consulting producer on the Cinemax series Mike Judge Presents: Tales from the Tour Bus. Mike Judge had been a fan of Nitzberg's since seeing his first documentary about rockabilly singer Hasil Adkins. Nitzberg was a writer and consulting producer on the pilot about Johnny Paycheck as well as the episodes about George Jones and Tammy Wynette.

On August 15, 2022, it was announced that Nitzberg will serve as the series creator, and also an executive producer and showrunner for the new adult animated comedy series Breaking Bear for Tubi. The series comes from Cartel Entertainment and Tom DeLonge's To the Stars Media. It is a parody of various mobster dramas, and it is described as Yogi Bear meets The Sopranos.
