= D. Ray White =

American mountain dancer (1927–1985)

- Born: Donald Ray White; April 17, 1927; Boone County, West Virginia, US
- Died: July 2, 1985 (aged 58); Prenter, West Virginia, US
- Occupations: Mountain dancer, entertainer
- Years active: 1940s–1985
- Spouse: Bertie Mae White
- Children: 13

Donald Ray White (April 17, 1927 – July 2, 1985) was an American mountain dancer and entertainer, and the patriarch of the White family. He has been featured in several American documentary films that detail the White family. His style was a subtle mix of tap and clog dancing that is native to the Appalachian Mountains and Appalachia. White rose to regional stardom before his murder in 1985 and became known as one of the greatest mountain dancers of his time. His son, Jesco White, known as "The Dancing Outlaw", who has also been the subject of several documentaries, has carried on his style and continues to perform.

== In media ==
D. Ray was profiled as a famous mountain dancer on a PBS special titled Talking Feet: Solo Southern Dance - Flatfoot, Buck and Tap, and is referred to in The Wild and Wonderful Whites of West Virginia. The 1991 PBS film Dancing Outlaw chronicled son Jesco's abilities as a mountain dancer. The 2009 film It Came from Trafalgar and the 2009 docudrama White Lightnin' were inspired by D. Ray and Jesco. D. Ray and his immediate family are the subject of the Hank Williams III song "D. Ray White," featured on his album Straight to Hell.

== Death ==
Steve Allen Rowe, 30, a fellow resident of Boone County, West Virginia, town of Prenter, shot D. Ray and his sons Jesco and Dorsey White with a 12-gauge shotgun outside D. Ray's home on July 2, 1985, after quarreling with White and his sons. D. Ray was killed by a shotgun wound to the chest, and Jesco and Dorsey were injured.
