= Whine de Lune =

Studio album by Trailer Bride
- Released: August 10, 1999
- Recorded: The Sound Of Music, Richmond, Virginia
- Genre: Alternative country
- Length: 32:45
- Label: Bloodshot
- Producer: Alan Weatherhead, Trailer Bride

Trailer Bride chronology
Smelling Salts (1998)	Whine de Lune (1999)	High Seas (2001)

Professional ratings
Review scores
Source	Rating
AllMusic	2.5/5 stars
Robert Christgau	A–
CMJ New Music Monthly	(favorable)
No Depression	(favorable)

Whine de Lune is the third album by the alternative country band Trailer Bride.

== Track listing ==
1. "Work on the Railroad" - 2:52
2. "Too Many Snakes" - 2:55
3. "Crazy Love" - 4:05
4. "Felt Like a Sin" - 2:30
5. "Clermont Hotel" - 3:20
6. "A Song for Emily" - 2:47
7. "Left-Hand Cigarette Blues" - 3:02
8. "Dirt Nap" - 2:36
9. "Sapphire Jewel" - 2:59
10. "Whine de Lune" - 3:00
11. "Pasture" - 2:39

== Personnel ==
- Brad Goodsby - drums, maracas, tambourine
- Scott Goodsby - guitar, lap steel guitar
- Melissa Swingle - vocals, banjo, guitar, harmonica, mandolin, organ, saw
- Daryl White - bass, background vocals
