= God (play) =

Play by Woody Allen

God, subtitled A Comedy in One Act, is a play by Woody Allen. It was first published in 1975, along with Death, and Allen's short stories in Woody Allen's book Without Feathers.

The comedy is modelled after Bertolt Brecht's epic theatre, in that the characters frequently point out the artificiality of the play and switch roles. Actors also play various audience members, and Woody Allen himself appears at one point as a voice on a phone.

== Plot ==
The setting is an ancient Greek amphitheatre, circa 500BC. Diabetes, an actor, and Hepatitis, a writer, sit on stage lamenting about how Hepatitis' new play lacks a good ending. They begin to frequently break the fourth wall, interacting with the audience and making note about how they are fictional characters in a play. Hepatitis asks if anyone has a major in philosophy, resulting in an audience member named Doris Levine joining the action on stage, while Diabetes calls the play's author Woody Allen for advice on how to proceed.

Another playwright, Trichinosis, joins the stage, saying that he has a machine that will help give the play a satisfying ending. The machine creates thunder and lightning effects, and allows an actor to descend from the roof in a harness in order to play God descending from the heavens to intervene at the conclusion in Hepatitis' play. Doris notes that this is a deus ex machina, while Hepatitis begins questioning God's existence. Eventually, another playwright named Lorenzo Miller enters and says that he is the author of a greater play, and that the real audience is fictional. Blanche DuBois enters, saying that she is tired of the brutality of Tennessee Williams' play. Hepatitis finally accepts Trichinosis' machine, and his play begins.

The play-within-a-play involves Diabetes playing a slave who is forced to courier a message to the king. He is nervous after being told that if the message is bad news, the king will execute him; he opens the message, but is not reassured when it reads only the word "Yes". He eventually reaches the king's castle and realises that "Yes" is an affirmative, and thus fundamentally good. However, the king reveals that the question that the message provides the answer for is: "Is there a God?", which enrages the king as it means that he will go to Hell for his sins. Just as the king is to execute Diabetes' character, Trichinosis' machine malfunctions and strangles the actor playing God. Hepatitis hurriedly tells Diabetes to ad-lib the ending, but several other fictional characters appear and several members of the audience begin to run amok at the breakdown of reality. Eventually, all the other actors leave and Diabetes and Hepatitis sit on stage alone together, repeating their lines from the beginning about the need for a good ending, suggesting that the entire play exists in an infinite loop.
