= Bury Me in Kern County =

- Directed by: Julien Nitzberg
- Written by: Julien Nitzberg
- Produced by: Hayley Marcus Simpson; Rachel Winter
- Starring: Mary Sheridan; Mary Lynn Rajskub; Judson Mills
- Cinematography: Kelly Evans; Warren Yeager
- Edited by: Charlie Webber
- Music by: Roger Neill
- Production company: Krank Production
- Release dates: March 1998 (SXSW); August 30, 1998 (United States)
- Running time: 90 minutes
- Country: United States
- Language: English

Bury Me in Kern County is a 1998 American black comedy film directed by Julien Nitzberg, starring Mary Sheridan, Mary Lynn Rajskub and Judson Mills. The film premiered in March 1998 at South by Southwest, where it was the runner-up for the Best Narrative Feature prize.

== Plot ==
Sandra and Dean are a low-class couple. One day, Dean is exposed on a Cops-like reality TV show for selling homemade speed in his living room. When Dean's mother happens to see the broadcast, she dies of a heart attack. Sandra becomes tasked with raising the money for both Dean's bail and her mother-in-law's funeral.

She first goes to her younger sister Amanda for help, and the two make a plan to rob a convenience store. However, another person has beat the pair to the same idea. While Sandra and Amanda smoke up in the parking lot, the unidentified thief makes off with the cash. The sisters give chase and Sandra fires off a warning shot, which ends up accidentally killing the thief. The women discover in horror that the thief was actually Dean, newly released from prison. To cover up all the loose ends of their now mounting dilemma, Sandra resolves to dig a large hole in which to bury Dean’s body and all the incriminating evidence. However, the two sisters come to blows when it’s revealed Amanda was the reason Dean was arrested in the first place.

== Cast ==
- Mary Sheridan as Sandra
- Mary Lynn Rajskub as Amanda
- Judson Mills as Dean
- Johnny Strong as Oldie
- Thom Rachford as Sgt. Pollock
- Sandra Tucker as Dani
- Victor Raider-Wexler as Mr. Decapato
- Geraldine Allen as Grandma

== Release ==
The film premiered at SXSW in March 1998. It also screened at the Chicago Underground Film Festival in 1999.

== Reception ==
Godfrey Cheshire of Variety called the film an "impressively assured and surprisingly pro debut" from Nitzberg, writing that he "combines a well-developed sardonic sense and some truly inspired casting choices to fashion a redneck mayhem fiesta that could find a welcoming fan base if accurately targeted toward hipper college and young urban auds."

Merle Bertrand of Film Threat wrote that the film features a "beyond redemption family that only Jerry Springer could love" and called the performances "over-the-top".
