= Smelling Salts (album) =

Studio album by Trailer Bride
- Released: March 24, 1998
- Genre: Alternative country
- Length: 38:49
- Label: Bloodshot
- Producer: Mike Beard, Trailer Bride

Trailer Bride chronology
Trailer Bride (1997)	Smelling Salts (1998)	Whine de Lune (1999)

Smelling Salts is the second album by the alternative country band Trailer Bride, their first for Bloodshot Records.

== Critical reception ==
Professional ratings
Review scores
Source	Rating
AllMusic	3/5 stars
Country Standard Time	(unrated)
Robert Christgau	(choice cut)
No Depression	(somewhat favorable)

AllMusic's Tim Sheridan wrote, "The real strength here is the insistent chime of Melissa Swingle's guitar against the elemental rhythm section of Brad Goolsby and Daryl White. At their best, they create the thick atmosphere of the Velvet Underground on a farm field trip."

== Track listing ==
1. "Quit That Jealousy" - 2:53
2. "Wildness" - 2:59
3. "Porch Song" - 2:57
4. "South of the Border" - 3:59
5. "From The Rooftop" - 3:58
6. "Graveyard" - 3:46
7. "Yoohoo River" - 3:12
8. "Cowgirl" - 4:24
9. "Show Bizness" - 3:41
10. "Bruises for Pearls" - 4:14
11. "Fighting Back the Buzzards" - 2:46

== Personnel ==
- Brad Goolsby - drums, percussion, shaker, tambourine
- Melissa Swingle - vocals, banjo, harmonica, mandolin, slide guitar, saw
- Daryl White - acoustic bass, bass fiddle

Additional personnel

- Mike Beard - jaw harp, organ
- Tommy "Too Tall" Evans - guitar
- Gunther - barking
- Bryon Settle - guitar
