= Trailer Bride =

Chapel Hill, North Carolina-based country band

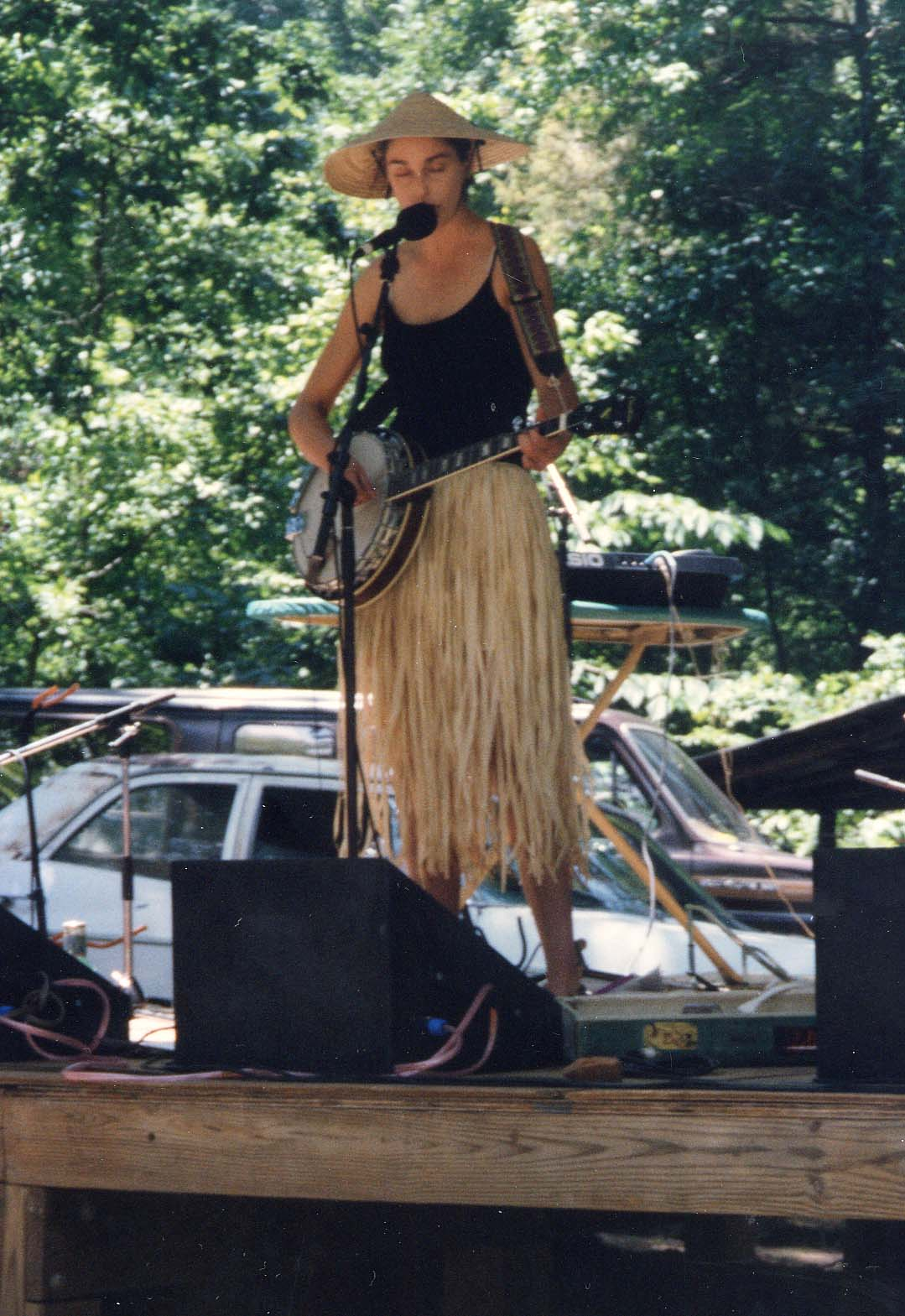
- Melissa Swingle of Trailer Bride. Festival for the Eno, Durham, North Carolina, July 2001.

Background information
- Origin: Chapel Hill, North Carolina, United States
- Genre: Alternative country
- Years active: 1993–2004
- Labels: Yep Roc, Bloodshot Records
- Members: Melissa Swingle; Robert Mitchener; Daryl White; Brad Goolsby; Bryon Settle; Scott Goolsby; Tim Barnes; John Bowman

Trailer Bride was a Chapel Hill, North Carolina–based alternative country rock band signed to Bloodshot Records. Formed in 1993, the band consisted of Melissa Swingle (vocalist, guitarist), Robert Mitchener (bass guitar), Brad Goolsby (drummer), Bryon Settle (guitarist) and Scott Goolsby (guitarist). In the summer of 1997, after the release of their first album, Daryl White replaced Mitchener as bassist.

The band is known for a southern gothic sound, with lyrics reminiscent of the works of Flannery O'Connor. Their songs are described as "spooky", and often contained dark themes of death, sin and sex. The first album, Trailer Bride, features songs of local character that celebrate Chatham County, North Carolina, and the main route to the nearby town of Chapel Hill, US 15-501. The first track of their album High Seas, "Jesco" is a homage to Jesco White, the Appalachian "Dancing Outlaw". The band met White while playing a show with Hasil Adkins. White told Swingle, "I don't get out much on account of being famous", which was used as a line in the song.

Swingle started playing music when she was pregnant with her child, Isabel. She learned that fumes from her oil painting could affect the baby, so while looking for another creative outlet, she began to play guitar. Isabel's artwork is on the album High Seas.

== Discography ==
Year	Title	Label
1997	Trailer Bride	Yep Roc
1998	Smelling Salts	Bloodshot Records
1999	Whine de Lune	Bloodshot Records
2001	High Seas	Bloodshot Records
2003	Hope Is a Thing with Feathers	Bloodshot Records
