= High Seas (album) =

Studio album by Trailer Bride
- Released: June 19, 2001
- Recorded: The Sound Of Music, Richmond, Virginia
- Genre: Alternative country
- Length: 35:59
- Label: Bloodshot
- Producers: Melissa Swingle, Alan Weatherhead, Daryl White

Trailer Bride chronology
Whine de Lune (1999)	High Seas (2001)	Hope Is a Thing with Feathers (2003)

High Seas is the fourth album by the American alternative country band Trailer Bride. It was released in 2001 by Bloodshot Records.

== Reception ==
Professional ratings
Review scores
Source	Rating
AllMusic	3/5 stars
Robert Christgau	(neither)
The Japan Times	(favorable)

A review of High Seas in the magazine No Depression described the album as "...A spooky, swampy triumph....unsettling and addictive with each subsequent spin..." The Chicago Tribune's Chris Nelson wrote in his review that "on High Seas...things are indeed odd, but they're also well executed, from the creepy to the caring and all emotional stops between."

Greil Marcus named the album his 2nd favorite rock album of 2001, writing that the band "...sounds like an old motel on Route 66 looks".

== Track listing ==
All songs written by Melissa Swingle except noted.

1. "Jesco" - 3:27
2. "High Seas" - 2:59
3. "Under Your Spell" - 3:06
4. "Itchin' for You" - 2:22
5. "Ghost of Mae West" - 3:39
6. "Wilderness" - 1:59
7. "Crickets" - 0:23
8. "Thankful Dirt" - 3:05
9. "Barcelona" - 3:06
10. "Drift in D" (Daryl White) - 2:52
11. "All Thine" - 2:43
12. "Run Rosie Run" - 2:59
13. "Bird Feet Feelings" - 3:19

== Personnel ==
- Brad Goolsby - drums
- Scott Goolsby - guitar
- Melissa Swingle - vocals, banjo, guitar, harmonica, piano, saw
- Daryl White - bass
