= Shagwüf =

American rock band

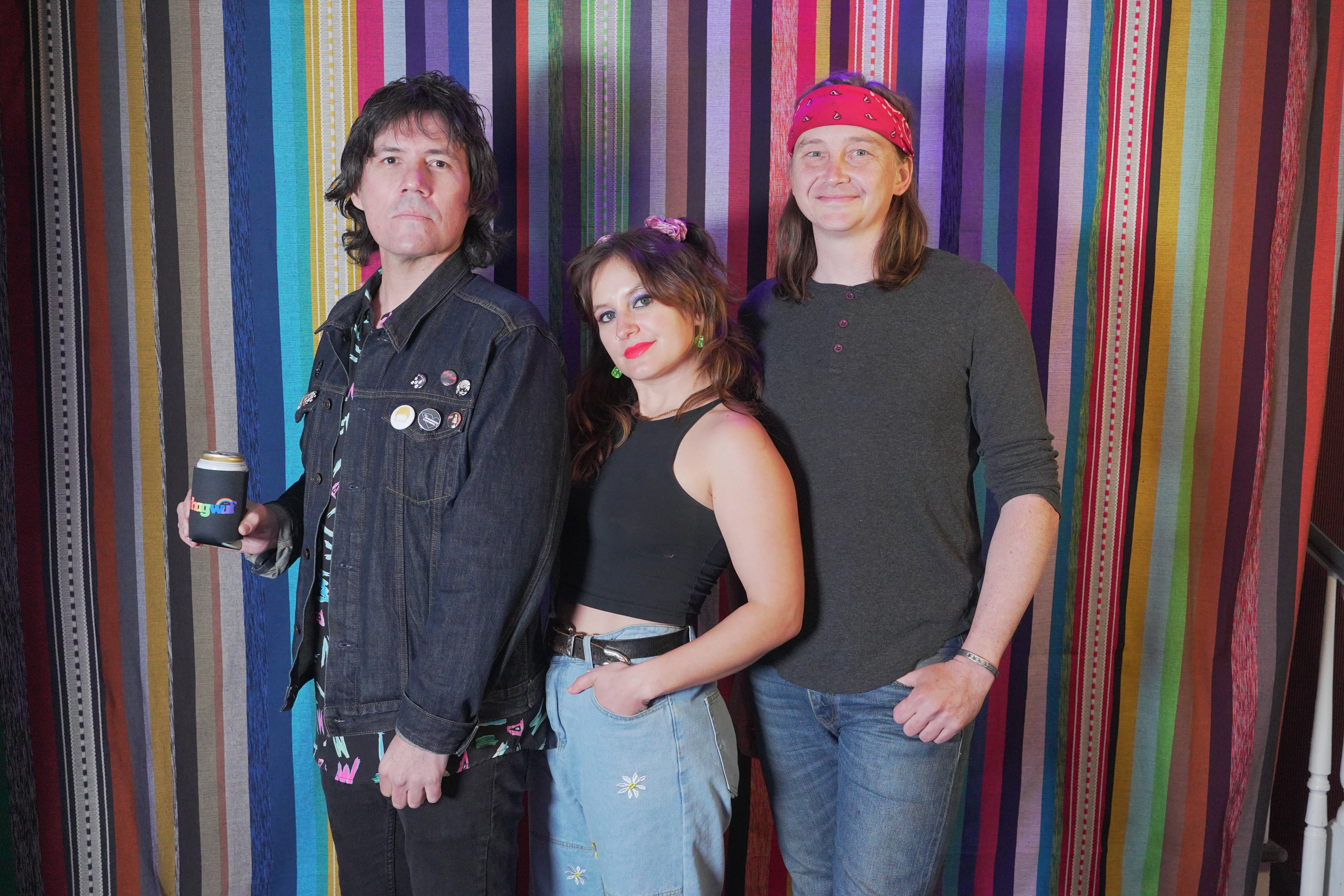
- Shagwüf in 2023 at Chinchilla Café. From left to right: Olivieri, Monnes, Stallings.

Background information
- Origin: Charlottesville
- Genres: Rock; psychedelia; gutter-glam
- Years active: 2014-present
- Members: Sally Monnes; Pete Stallings; Brittany Horkan
- Past members: Pablo Olivieri
- Website: www.shagwuf.com

Shagwüf is a three-piece rock band based in Charlottesville, VA. Their third full-length album, Tres Animales, was released on September 1, 2024.

== History ==
Shagwüf initially started as a side project between bassist Sally Rose Monnes and guitarist Sweet Pete Stallings while members of The Sally Rose Band, officially forming Shagwüf in 2014. Their first album ¡Salvaje! was released in 2016.

Shagwüf was named "Best Rock Band" by RVA Magazine in their "The Richmond Music of Right Now" 2024 readers poll.

In March 2026, Shagwüf announced via Instagram that Pablo Olivieri decided to step away from the band, citing family and personal matters. Later in April, they announced that musician Brittany Horkan would be playing drums for the band.

== Style and Influences ==
While Shagwüf's music is typically characterized as rock, their music is also described as psychedelic, gutter-glam, swamp-rock, stoner rock, and rap rock.

Shagwüf's self-claimed influences include Latin beats, power pop, stoner metal and classic rock. Members of Shagwüf cite other musical influences such as James Brown, Black Sabbath, and post-1950s pop music.

== Members ==
Current members

- Sally Rose Monnes – bass, vocals (2014–present)
- Sweet Pete Stallings – guitar, vocals (2014–present)
- Brittany Horkan – drums (2026–present)

Former members

- Pablo Daniel Olivieri – drums (2014–2026)

Collaborators

- Rich Tarbell – photography, visuals

== Discography ==
Full-Length Albums

- ¡Salvaje! (2016)
- Dog Days of Disco (2020)
- Tres Animales (2024)

EPs

- Heavy Petting (2014)
- Trendy Weapon (2020)
