= Hope Is a Thing with Feathers =

Hope Is a Thing With Feathers

Studio album by Trailer Bride
- Released: September 23, 2003
- Recorded: Kudzu Ranch, Mebane, North Carolina
- Genre: Alternative country
- Length: 42:35
- Label: Bloodshot
- Producer: Rick Miller, Trailer Bride

Trailer Bride chronology
High Seas (2001)	Hope Is a Thing With Feathers (2003)

Hope Is a Thing With Feathers is the fifth and final album by the alternative country band Trailer Bride. Its title bears a strong resemblance to the first line and title of a poem by Emily Dickinson, "Hope" is the thing with feathers.

== Reception ==
Professional ratings
Review scores
Source	Rating
AllMusic	2.5/5 stars

Mojo Magazine (December 1, 2003): "3 stars out of 5 - [T]here's a mix of twisted folk rock, recalling a less skeletal Palace and early-Nick-Cave-in-a-cowboy-hat rock."

== Track listing ==
All songs written by Melissa Swingle except noted.

1. "Silk Hope Road" - 3:03
2. "Hope is a Thing with Feathers" (Emily Dickinson, Daryl White) - 3:15
3. "Skinny White Girl" - 4:47
4. "Mach 1" (Melissa Swingle, Daryl White) - 2:18
5. "Destiny" - 3:59
6. "Lightning" - 3:37
7. "Vagabond Motel" - 5:07
8. "Quickstep" - 3:11
9. "Shiloh" - 3:46
10. "Drive with the Wind" - 2:45
11. "Waking Dream" - 3:13
12. "Mockingbird" - 3:34

== Personnel ==
- Tim Barnes - guitar
- John Bowman - drums, tambourine
- Melissa Swingle - vocals, accordion, guitar, harmonica, organ, piano, saw
- Daryl White - bass, bow

Additional personnel

- Mary Huff - harmony vocals
