= List of songs recorded by Angels & Airwaves =

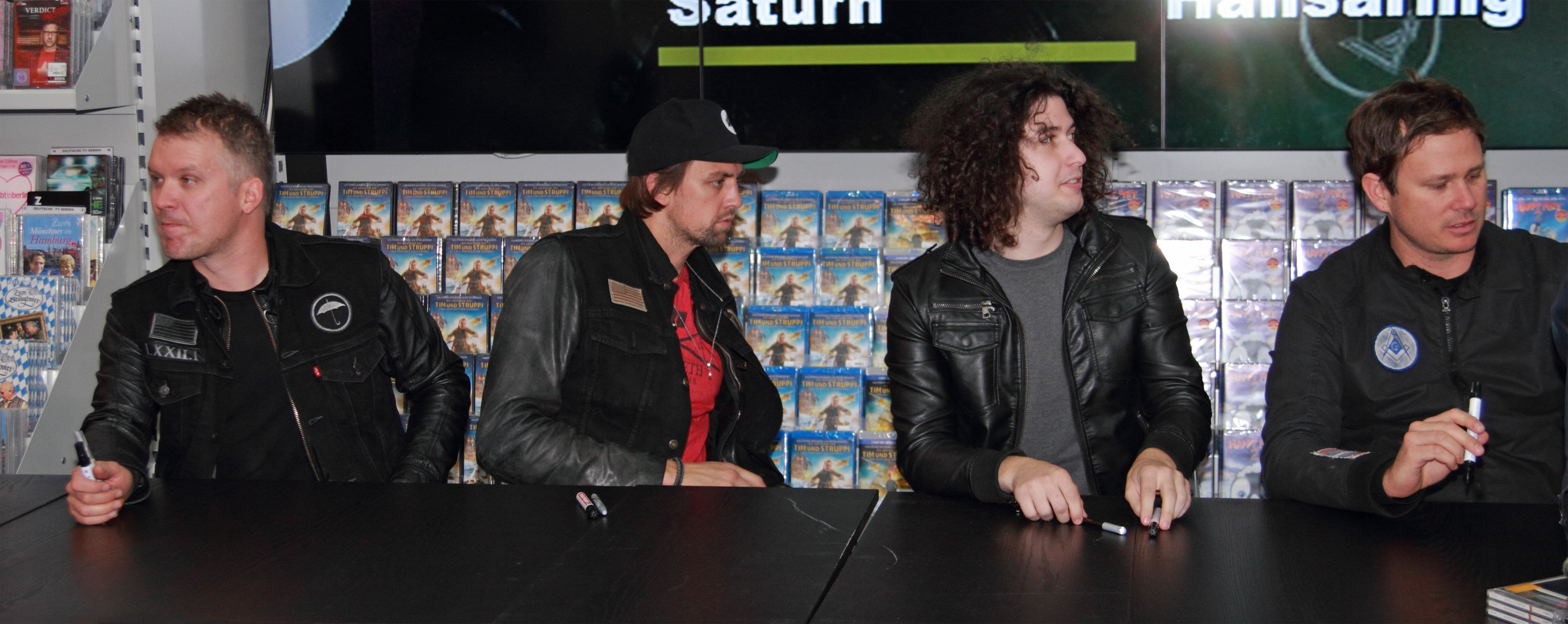
Angels & Airwaves at a signing in April 2012. From left to right: Matt Wachter, David Kennedy, Ilan Rubin, Tom DeLonge.

American rock band Angels & Airwaves recorded songs for five studio albums and various extended plays. The majority of the group's original material is written by vocalist and guitarist Tom DeLonge. In all, the group has recorded 66 songs.

== Songs ==
Key
Indicates single release

Name of song, originating album, and year released.
Song	Album	Year	Ref.
"The Adventure"	We Don't Need to Whisper	2006	
"A Little's Enough"	We Don't Need to Whisper	2006	
"All That We Are"	Love: Part Two	2011	
"All That's Left Is Love"	Non-Album Single	2020	
"Anomaly"	The Dream Walker	2014	
"Artillery"	Chasing Shadows	2016	
"Anxiety"	Love: Part Two	2011	
"Behold a Pale Horse"	Love: Part Two	2011	
"Breathe"	I-Empire	2007	
"Bullets in the Wind"	The Dream Walker	2014	
"Call to Arms"	I-Empire	2007	
"Chasing Shadows"	Chasing Shadows	2016	
"Clever Love"	Love	2010	
"The Disease"	The Dream Walker	2014	
"Distraction"	We Don't Need to Whisper	2006	
"Do It for Me Now"	We Don't Need to Whisper	2006	
"Dry Your Eyes"	Love: Part Two	2011	
"Et Ducit Mundum Per Luce"	Love	2010	
"Epic Holiday"	Love	2010	
"Everything's Magic"	I-Empire	2007	
"Euphoria"	Lifeforms	2021	
"The Flight of Apollo"	Love	2010	
"The Gift"	We Don't Need to Whisper	2006	
"Good Day"	We Don't Need to Whisper	2006	
"Hallucinations"	Love	2010	
"Heaven"	I-Empire	2007	
"Home"	...Of Nightmares	2015	
"Inertia"	Love: Part Two	2011	
"Into the Night"	...Of Nightmares	2015	
"It Hurts"	We Don't Need to Whisper	2006	
"Jumping Rooftops"	I-Empire	2007	
"Kiss & Tell"	Lifeforms	2019	
"Kiss with a Spell"	The Dream Walker	2014	
"Letters to God, Part II"	Love	2010	
"Lifeline"	I-Empire	2007	
"Love Like Rockets"	I-Empire	2007	
"The Machine"	We Don't Need to Whisper	2006	
"Mercenaries"	The Dream Walker	2014	
"Moon as My Witness"	Love: Part Two	2011	
"The Moon-Atomic (...Fragments and Fictions)"	Love	2010	
"My Heroine (It's Not Over)"	Love: Part Two	2011	
"One Last Thing"	Love: Part Two	2011	
"Overload"	Chasing Shadows	2016	
"Paper Thin"	Non-Album Single	2020	
"Paralyzed"	The Dream Walker	2014	
"Parasomnia"	...Of Nightmares	2015	
"Reel 1 (Diary)"	Stomping the Phantom Brake Pedal	2013	
"Reel 5 (New Blood)"	Stomping the Phantom Brake Pedal	2013	
"Reel 6"	Stomping the Phantom Brake Pedal	2013	
"Rebel Girl"	Lifeforms	2019	
"The Revelator"	Love: Part Two	2011	
"Rite of Spring"	I-Empire	2007	
"Saturday Love"	Love: Part Two	2011	
"Secret Crowds"	I-Empire	2007	
"Shove"	Love	2010	
"Sirens"	I-Empire	2007	
"Some Origins of Fire"	Love	2010	
"Soul Survivor (...2012)"	Love	2010	
"Star of Bethlehem"	I-Empire	2007	
"Start the Machine"	We Don't Need to Whisper	2006	
"Surrender"	Love: Part Two	2011	
"True Love "	I-Empire	2007	
"Teenagers and Rituals"	The Dream Walker	2014	
"Tremors"	The Dream Walker	2014	
"Tunnels"	The Dream Walker	2014	
"Valkyrie Missile"	We Don't Need to Whisper	2006	
"View from Below"	...Of Nightmares	2015	
"Voyager"	Chasing Shadows	2016	
"The War"	We Don't Need to Whisper	2006	
"The Wolfpack"	The Dream Walker	2014	
"Young London"	Love	2010	
"Timebomb"	Lifeforms	2021	
"Spellbound"	Lifeforms	2021	
"No More Guns"	Lifeforms	2021	
"Losing My Mind"	Lifeforms	2021	
"Automatic"	Lifeforms	2021	
"Restless Souls"	Lifeforms	2021	
"A Fire in a Nameless Town"	Lifeforms	2021	
