= Kiss & Tell (Angels & Airwaves song) =

Promotional single by Angels & Airwaves

from the album Lifeforms
- Released: August 29, 2019
- Genre: Alternative rock; electronic rock; pop punk
- Length: 4:08
- Label: Rise
- Songwriters: Tom DeLonge; Ilan Rubin; Aaron Rubin
- Producer: Aaron Rubin

Angels & Airwaves singles chronology
"Rebel Girl" (2019)	"Kiss & Tell" (2019)	"All That's Left Is Love" (2020)

Music video
- "Kiss & Tell" on YouTube

"Kiss & Tell" is a song by the American rock band, Angels & Airwaves. The song was released on August 29, 2019, as a promotional single for the band's 2019 North American Tour, and appears as the final track on their sixth album, Lifeforms. The song was written by DeLonge, Ilan Rubin, and Aaron Rubin.

== Background ==
Many months before its release, small portions of "Kiss & Tell" were originally used as promotional music for the band to tease the release of their previous single, "Rebel Girl", and the announcement of their 2019 North American Tour on their social media profiles. While it hadn't been confirmed as a song from the album yet, DeLonge briefly discussed the song in an interview with Rolling Stone, feeling that it could have "lived on the I-Empire and We Don’t Need to Whisper records." The song's lyrics address doing something dangerous or something a person knows they shouldn't be doing, all while feeling nothing but excitement from their actions. DeLonge specifically cites The Beach Boys as his main influence, stating he "wanted to create a sound that had electronic elements right alongside classic rock and pop punk melodic structures."

== Release and reception ==
Angels & Airwaves announced the release of the song on their Instagram profile on August 27, 2019, with a promised release date three days later. However, the band played it at their first live show of their concert tour the next day, and proceeded to instead make the release one day early. While the song was believed to be the second single from the album, DeLonge confirmed that it was not when responding to a question asked by a fan on Twitter. and would further clarify it was meant to be a promotional single for the 2019 North American Tour.

Multiple critics responded positively about the song's themes and instrumental direction. Philip Trapp of Loudwire, called the song "a high-speed ode to life's exciting and affirming challenges", while Patrick Doyle of Rolling Stone felt that the song heavily featured "the driving New Wave sounds and atmospheric hooks that differentiated Angels & Airwaves from DeLonge’s other group, Blink-182." Katrina Nattress of iHeartRadio even went on to compare the song to DeLonge and David Kennedy's previous band, Box Car Racer, feeling that it sounded "like it could be a B-side" from their self-titled album.

== Music video ==
Shortly after the song's release, DeLonge began to tease that a music video for "Kiss & Tell" was in the works on his social media accounts. The video itself was released on November 4, 2019, and features the band (including touring bassist Matt Rubano) playing the song in a brightly lit music video set. Simultaneously, there are also clips of DeLonge playing his guitar on a couch in a multicolored room while he and a young woman (portrayed by the model Britni Sumida on Instagram) flirt with each other. At the end of the video the woman turns off the power in the studio, abruptly ending the song before it is finished, but the final seconds of the song are then played as the video ends.

Earlier that year, DeLonge had filed for divorce from his wife of 18 years, which lead fans to speculate if the video was directly inspired by the events. When discussing the video, DeLonge stated that it was about miscommunication in relationships and how it can cause said relationships to develop more problems:

“So many issues in relationships revolve around needless miscommunication, and just missing each other’s point of view. This video represents how a few small negative moments between lovers can easily grow into much more destructive interactions over time.” - Tom DeLonge

== Track listing ==
- Digital download
1. "Kiss & Tell" – 4:08

== Personnel ==
Angels & Airwaves

- Tom DeLonge – vocals, keyboards, synthesizers, songwriting
- Ilan Rubin – drums, backing vocals, guitars, bass guitar, keyboards, songwriting
- David Kennedy – keyboards, synthesizers

Production

- Aaron Rubin – producer, songwriting, engineer
- Ben Moore – engineer
- Tony Hoffer – mixing
- Tom Baker – mastering engineer

Creative Direction

- Tension Division (TNSN DVSN)

== Charts ==
Chart (2019)	Peak position
US Hot Rock & Alternative Songs (Billboard)	39
