= Lifeforms (Angels & Airwaves album) =

Studio album by Angels & Airwaves
- Released: September 24, 2021
- Recorded: April 2018 – April 2021
- Studios: Bunker of Brilliance, Los Angeles; Jupiter Sound, Encinitas; Signature Sound, San Diego; Singing Serpent, San Diego; The Hit Lair, San Diego
- Genres: Post-punk; alternative rock; punk rock; pop rock
- Length: 37:48
- Label: Rise
- Producers: Angels & Airwaves; Aaron Rubin

Angels & Airwaves chronology
We Don't Need to Whisper Acoustic – EP (2017)	Lifeforms (2021)

Angels & Airwaves studio album chronology
The Dream Walker (2014)	Lifeforms (2021)

Singles from Lifeforms
- 1. "Rebel Girl" Released: April 30, 2019; 2. "Euphoria" Released: May 19, 2021; 3. "Restless Souls" Released: June 15, 2021; 4. "Losing My Mind" Released: July 29, 2021; 5. "Spellbound" Released: September 8, 2021

Lifeforms is the sixth studio album by American alternative rock band Angels & Airwaves. The album was released on September 24, 2021, and marks the longest gap between albums for the band following 2014's The Dream Walker. It is the band's first album with bassist Matt Rubano, who replaced Matt Wachter in 2019, and the first with guitarist David Kennedy since 2011's Love: Part Two.

Lifeforms was a conscious effort by the band's frontman, Tom DeLonge, to return to their earlier sound, while also incorporating elements of punk rock and post-hardcore. To do this, the band put a higher emphasis on the guitar parts so that the album would have a more "rebellious and emotional connection" to listeners. It was recorded over the span of three years, beginning in April 2018.

The album was promoted by five official singles; "Rebel Girl", "Euphoria", "Restless Souls", "Losing My Mind", and "Spellbound". Promotional singles "Kiss & Tell" and "Timebomb" were also released prior to the album.

== Background ==
Angels & Airwaves frontman, Tom DeLonge, is known to be a believer in aliens, UFOs, and conspiracy theories since his youth, long before starting his music career. In the early 2010s, he began to build a network of well-known government officials with his company, To the Stars, in order to further study these topics. Some of these officials have included former military counter-intelligence officer Luis Elizondo, who directed the Defense Intelligence Agency's Advanced Aerospace Threat Identification Program, and Christopher Mellon, former United States Deputy Assistant Secretary of Defense for Intelligence. Due to this work, DeLonge began to focus more on the growth and research done by his company, as well as partnering with multiple authors to release numerous books. This resulted in him not only taking an extended leave from his music career, but also making his second exit from his other band, Blink-182.

Footage of the UAP, 'GOFAST', that DeLonge helped declassify and influenced the writing of Lifeforms.

In between The Dream Walker and Lifeforms, songwriting and music promotion consisted of only DeLonge and Ilan Rubin, thought it was never confirmed that the other members had left the band. In that time, the band released three EPs and a collection of demos from The Dream Walker. Specifically in 2015, DeLonge revealed that he had planned to release two Angels & Airwaves albums, two solo albums, and fifteen novels, but by the end of the year he had only delivered on his solo album, To the Stars... Demos, Odds and Ends, and the band's EP, ...Of Nightmares. In 2017, DeLonge also began to detail plans for a film titled Strange Times that was expected to feature music from a new album by the band. DeLonge was set to also direct the film, but by December 2018, it was revealed that the film was now planned to be a television series being adapted by TBS, and that DeLonge would be acting as a producer instead. Since then, there has been no news on the production of the series.

The work that DeLonge was doing with To The Stars started to cross into Angels & Airwaves in 2016, when the band announced the Sekret Machines project. The project was described as a "transmedia series" that focused on Unidentified Aerial Phenomena, also referred to as UAP, and primarily consisted of the novel series of the same name, and the band's EP Chasing Shadows, which released on April 8, 2016. Following this project, To the Stars released a group of US military videos capturing multiple UAPs, which were then declassified by the Pentagon in 2019, and confirmed by the military as authentic. Much of this research was filmed for the History Channel series Unidentified: Inside America's UFO Investigation, which DeLonge stars in and was an executive producer of. Shortly after, the military confirmed that they had begun a partnership with the company to continue research on the topic.

== Recording ==
With the continued growth of To the Stars, DeLonge began to make a more consistent return to his music career in 2018, beginning with the announcement that David Kennedy and Matt Wachter would be recording with him and Rubin. However, when the band released Lifeforms' first single, "Rebel Girl" the following year, the lineup consisted of only DeLonge, Kennedy, and Rubin, with no explanation given for why Wachter was absent. Having gone on tour with Taking Back Sunday while he was still in Blink-182, DeLonge recruited bassist Matt Rubano for the band's 2019 US concert tour. Shortly after the end of the tour, Rubano began appearing in the band's music videos, and along with Instagram posts by DeLonge of Rubano writing and recording with the band, it was confirmed that he was now an official member.

Lifeforms saw repeated delays for its release date, mostly attributed to the album's recording process. Initially planned for a summer 2019 release, it was delayed by two years, as the band continued to write and record new songs. Recording for the album had initially been completed before the COVID-19 pandemic, but the band chose to rework its composition, as DeLonge wanted to create an album “without using all of those same old tricks that I have in the toolbox”. DeLonge had also become frustrated with the lack of rock in mainstream music, and wanted to take heavier inspiration from music styles he listened to and played in his youth.

“Some bands start out super punk, then mellow [out] as they get older. They want to play music that's more like what they listen to [to relax] at home. This band started out atmospheric, though, so it made sense to go more raw and more edgy. It felt like to push the Angels & Airwaves' boundaries literally meant to go back in time! So much music nowadays has turned into pop. 'Alt' has literally become dance music. I'm used to punk rock bands having a meaning. We made music because we had something we had to get off our chests. Some bands wanted to be political. Some bands wanted to break something. Some bands, like blink, wrote 'nursery rhymes on meth' because we all came from broken homes and we wanted to be funny, fast and energetic to get us out of there. I wanted to bring back that soul.” - Tom DeLonge

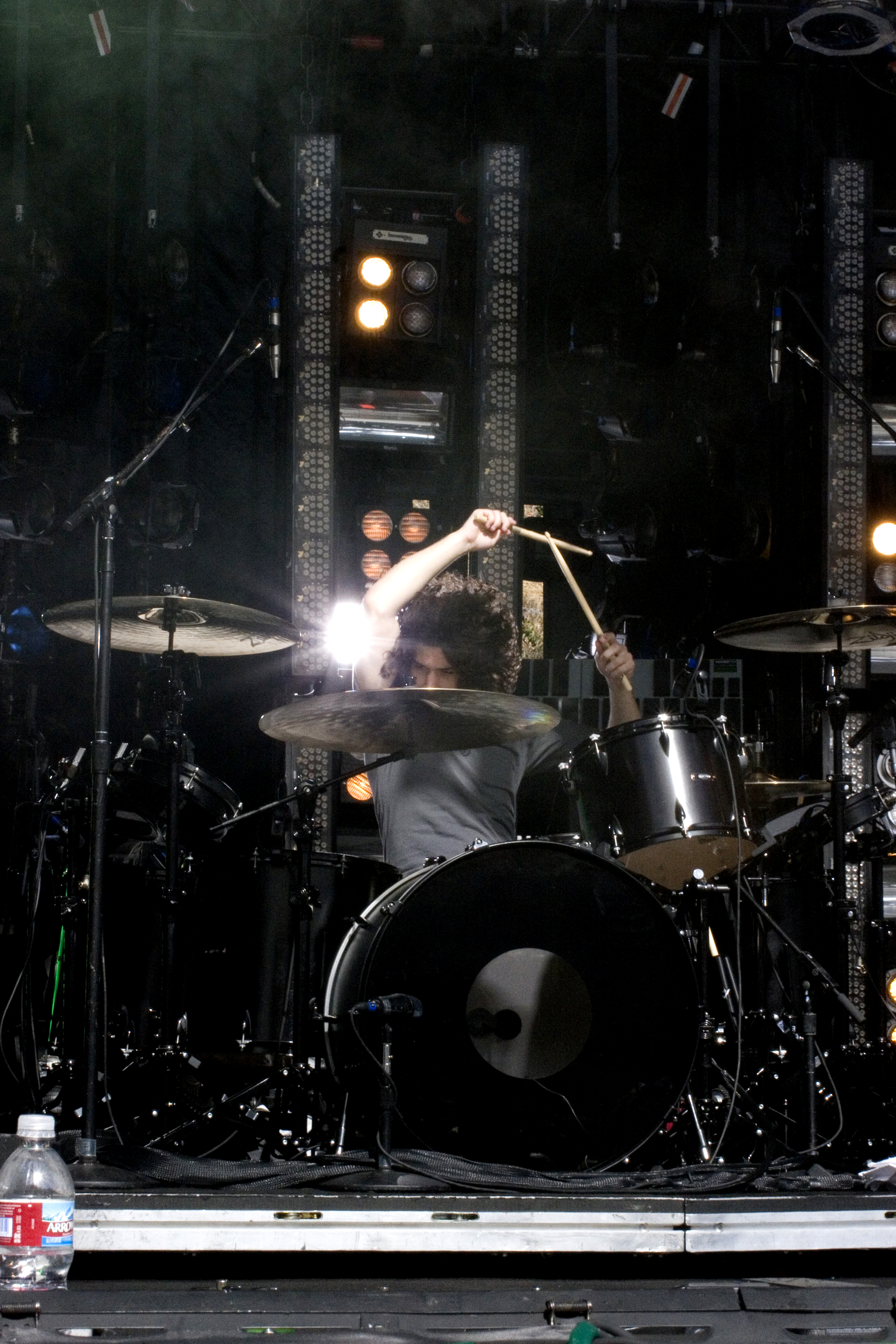
Ilan Rubin (seen here in 2009) was credited as a key part of the songwriting process for Lifeforms.

Unlike many of the band's previous releases, Lifeforms' demoing process was almost entirely done digitally. In an interview with Guitar World, DeLonge stated that this approach allowed the band to "move really fast when we're doing the demo songwriting process". Each of the band members would begin building their own demos and hand them off to Rubin, who would take them and make his own adjustments before the actual recording process began. This allowed the band to be more collaborative in their writing, and feel more satisfied with the final product.

Over the course of Lifeforms' recording process, DeLonge regularly made posts to his social media profiles teasing clip of song demos, and other members recording. Many of these teasers included comparisons to DeLonge and Kennedy's former band, Box Car Racer, which has often been seen as the precursor to Angels & Airwaves. While Box Car Racer has been seen as having a more post-hardcore inspired sound compared to Angels & Airwaves, many critics felt that the album's second single, "Euphoria" delivered on these promises. Another pre-release song, "Kiss & Tell" was also compared to a style similar to The Beach Boys.

== Theming ==
Some of the themes addressed on Lifeforms include social interaction, conspiracy theories, and understanding the existence of the human race. Many of these themes took heavy inspiration from DeLonge's work with To the Stars and his divorce from his wife of 18 years. In a press statement on the album, DeLonge stated "This album for me is a journey through different relationships, different points of view, and how we each have our own life path". DeLonge would detail the album's theme's more in an interview with Kerrang:

“We have so many lifeforms which are interacting with us which we don't even know about. Not just UFOs, but things like ghosts and Bigfoot, too. The universe is basically this one giant mind – like the mind of God – with trillions of stacked frequencies of thought. Not linear, parallel: past, present and future all existing right now. But there's a duality there, too, like the concept of The Force in Star Wars, where there's Light and Dark. Matter and antimatter stacked on top of each other. Every particle has its counter particle. Protons, electrons, neutrons, whatever…”

Unlike the band's previous releases, Lifeforms also addresses a number of political topics, such as gun violence and racial inequalities in the United States. While speaking to NME, DeLonge stated that these are topics that he normally avoids when writing music, but felt that it was important to in order to be more truthful and authentic in his song writing.

== Release ==
The majority of songs from Lifeforms were released ahead of the album, with a handful of said songs coming out prior to the album's announcement. "Rebel Girl" was released as Lifeforms' lead single in April 2019, and was accompanied by the announcement that the band had moved to Rise Records, and would be touring that summer. To support the tour, "Kiss & Tell" was released that summer, but DeLonge confirmed that it was not an official single, and released for promotional purposes. The album's second single, "Euphoria", was announced on May 19, 2021, just a few days after the band revealed their new fan community, The Empire Club. Lifeforms was officially announced on June 15, 2021, with a release date of September 24, 2021. The band announced the album by launching a renewable hydrogen capsule into space that played a preview of the album's opening track, "Timebomb", and revealed the band's 2021-2022 world tour. An additional song, "Restless Souls" was released along with the album's announcement.

Prior to the tour, the band released the album's fourth single "Losing My Mind", along with a corresponding music video featuring TikTok star, Rampage, and a character named "Disco" played by DeLonge. Disco is said to be the older brother of Boomer, a character that DeLonge played in the music video for the Blink-182 song, "First Date". A director's cut of the video was also released on the band's website.

Additional songs, "Spellbound" and "Timebomb" were released on September 8 and September 22 respectively, with an accompanying music video coming out for the former.

Following Lifeforms' release, the band collaborated with Z2 Comics for Lifeform: Vivian: a graphic novel centered on the character featured on the album's cover. Set to be released in fall of 2022, the novel was co-written by DeLonge and Helen Mullane, and acts as an expansion on many of the conspiracy theory and meaning of life themes.

== Reception ==
Professional ratings
Aggregate scores
Source	Rating
Metacritic	80/100
Review scores
Source	Rating
AllMusic	4/5 stars
Clash	8/10
Classic Rock	3/5 stars
DIY	3/5 stars
Kerrang!	4/5 stars
NME	4/5 stars
Sputnikmusic	4.2/5
Wall of Sound	8/10

=== Commercial performance ===
Lifeforms debuted at number thirty six on the US Billboard 200, while also charting in the top ten on US Independent, Alternative, and Rock albums charts each. The album also charted well internationally, appearing in Canada, the UK, France, Germany, Austria, and Belgium. The album also marked the first time the band charted in Switzerland, peaking at eighty.

=== Critical reception ===
Lifeforms received mainly positive reviews from music critics. On Metacritic, which assigns a normalized rating out of 100 to reviews from mainstream publications, the album has so far received an average score of 80, based on 7 reviews, indicating "generally favorable" reviews.

Many reviews praised the album for its ambitious sound compared to the band's previous work, and felt that it still delivered their classic style. Jake Richardson of Kerrang! gave the album 4 out of 5, calling it "the perfect musical companion to an evening spent looking at the starry night's sky". He specifically praised Delonge's vocals, calling them "invigorated and on fine form". Ali Shutler of NME also gave the album 4 out of 5 stars, specifically pointing out the band's shift in theming to address more political topics. Wall of Sound's Paul 'Browny' Brown scored Lifeforms 8/10 stating it was a "safe, yet daring (at times) approach, combining signature styles with old-school inspirations..."

== Track listing ==
All tracks are written by Tom DeLonge, Ilan Rubin, Aaron Rubin, and Matt Rubano, except where noted.

No.	Title	Writer(s)	Length
1.	"Timebomb"		3:58
2.	"Euphoria"		4:24
3.	"Spellbound"	DeLonge, I. Rubin, A. Rubin	4:17
4.	"No More Guns"		2:40
5.	"Losing My Mind"		3:52
6.	"Automatic"		3:23
7.	"Restless Souls"		3:47
8.	"Rebel Girl"	DeLonge, I. Rubin, A. Rubin	3:46
9.	"A Fire in a Nameless Town"		3:33
10.	"Kiss & Tell"	DeLonge, I. Rubin, A. Rubin	4:08
Total length:			37:48

Japanese bonus track
No.	Title	Writer(s)	Length
11.	"All That's Left Is Love"	DeLonge, I. Rubin, A. Rubin	4:05
Total length:			41:53

== Personnel ==
Angels & Airwaves

- Tom DeLonge – lead vocals, guitar, keyboards, songwriter, producer
- Ilan Rubin – drums, percussion, bass, keyboards, guitar, vocals, songwriter, producer
- David Kennedy – lead guitar, keyboards, producer
- Matt Rubano – bass, keyboards, vocals, songwriter, producer

Additional personnel

- Aaron Rubin – producer, songwriter, engineer, mixing
- Ben Moore – engineer
- Tony Hoffer – mixing
- Tom Baker – mastering engineer
- Tom Lord-Alge – mix engineer
- Emily Lazar – engineer
- Rich Costey – mixing, engineer
- Chris Allgood – engineer
- Jeff Citron – engineer

== Charts ==
Chart performance for Lifeforms
Chart (2021)	Peak position
Austrian Albums (Ö3 Austria)	40
Belgian Albums (Ultratop Wallonia)	191
Canadian Albums (Billboard)	94
German Albums (Offizielle Top 100)	14
Scottish Albums (Official Charts)	6
Swiss Albums (Schweizer Hitparade)	80
UK Albums (Official Charts)	17
UK Independent Albums (Official Charts)	3
US Billboard 200	36
US Independent Albums (Billboard)	5
US Top Alternative Albums (Billboard)	4
US Top Rock Albums (Billboard)	3
