= Timebomb (Angels & Airwaves song) =

Promotional single by Angels & Airwaves

from the album Lifeforms
- Released: September 22, 2021
- Genre: EDM; post-punk; new wave
- Length: 3:59
- Label: Rise
- Songwriter(s): Tom DeLonge; Ilan Rubin; Matt Rubano; Aaron Rubin
- Producer(s): Aaron Rubin

Angels & Airwaves singles chronology
| "Spellbound" (2021) | "Timebomb" (2021) |

"Timebomb" is a song by the American rock band, Angels & Airwaves. The song was released on September 22, 2021, as a promotional single from the band's sixth album, Lifeforms. The song was written by Tom DeLonge, Ilan Rubin, Matt Rubano, and Aaron Rubin.

== Background ==
"Timebomb" was originally written back in 2019, and was used by the band to promote both Lifeforms and a documentary that was being made about the band. At the time that the documentary was revealed, the band's current bassist, Matt Rubano, was still a touring member, but when he became an official member of the band in 2020, much of the songs on Lifeforms began to be rewritten to create a more post-hardcore sound that DeLonge was looking to achieve. Because of this, Rubano became more involved in the writing process of the album, and is credited as a songwriter on "Timebomb". The song was not fully elaborated on until its official release, to which DeLonge released a press statement on its meaning. Lyrically, the song discusses sources of stress in life as they affect a teenager, all while feeling like a bomb about to explode:

"'Timebomb' is a special song to me because it represents the emotional equivalent of an armed device about to blow. I think everyone can relate to the pressure of life bearing down on a young teenage heart." - Tom DeLonge

== Release and reception ==
Before its release, a preview of "Timebomb" was used in a video where the band announced Lifeforms. The announcement came in the form of the band launching a renewable hydrogen capsule into space that played a preview of the song, while also announcing their 2021 tour, and new song "Restless Souls". Also prior to the release, the band played "Timebomb" at multiple shows. The song was officially released on September 22, 2021 with an accompanying lyric video.

The song was met with mostly positive feedback. Jon Blistein of Rolling Stone called it "the kind of shimmering post-punk/new wave rush Angels & Airwaves excel at", while also praising the song's synthesizers. Jake Richardson of Kerrang called the song "otherworldly", while also reviewing the album as a whole. Wall of Sound's Paul Brown felt that while it wasn't as good as the following album track, "Euphoria", it still provided "all the quirky things we know and love from this group such as uptempo synthesizers, Tom’s iconic twang/mispronunciations and that futuristic future rock sound AVA have perfected since their conception way back in 2005".

== Personnel ==
Angels & Airwaves

- Tom DeLonge – vocals, keyboards, synthesizers, songwriting
- Ilan Rubin – drums, backing vocals, guitars, bass guitar, keyboards, songwriting
- Matt Rubano – bass guitar, songwriting

Production

- Aaron Rubin – producer, songwriting, engineer
- Rich Costey – engineer
- Emily Lazer – engineer
- Chris Allgood – engineer
- Jeff Citron – mixing
