= Scenic (album) =

Studio album by Denver Harbor
- Released: October 12, 2004
- Recorded: Cherokee Studios (Los Angeles, California)
- Genre: Rock, alternative, post-grunge, pop punk
- Length: 48:04
- Label: Universal
- Producer: Mark Trombino

Denver Harbor chronology
Extended Play EP (2003)	Scenic (2004)

Professional ratings
Review scores
Source	Rating
Allmusic	2.5/5 stars

Scenic is the first and only full-length album by Denver Harbor, released on October 12, 2004 on Universal Records. It contains re-recorded versions of four of the five tracks from their debut EP Extended Play ("Picture Perfect Wannabe", "Outta My Head", "Satisfied" and "Way Back Home"), as well as two of the three songs from their 2003 demo ("All I Want" and "Move On").

== Track listing ==
1. "Xenophobia"
2. "Picture Perfect Wannabe"
3. "Outta My Head"
4. "Satisfied"
5. "All I Want"
6. "The Ride"
7. "Move On"
8. "Way Back Home"
9. "Twenty Six"
10. "Twenty Seven"
11. "My Holiday (Save Me)"
12. "Let You Go"

== Personnel ==
- Dennis Hill – guitar
- Chris Lewis – guitar
- Aaron Rubin – bass
- Ilan Rubin – drums
- Will Salazar – vocals, guitar
- Mark Trombino – percussion, programming
