= Denver Harbor =

American alternative rock band

- (L-R) Salazar, I. Rubin, Lewis, A. Rubin

Background information
- Origin: San Diego, California, United States
- Genres: Alternative rock, post-grunge
- Years active: 2002–2006
- Label: Universal
- Members: Will Salazar; Chris Lewis; Aaron Rubin; Ilan Rubin

Denver Harbor was an American alternative rock band, based in San Diego, California. The band was formed in 2002 by former Fenix TX members Will Salazar and Chris Lewis, along with F.O.N. members Aaron Rubin and Ilan Rubin. After self-releasing their debut EP Extended Play in 2003, they were temporarily signed to Universal Records, who released their 2004 full-length album Scenic.

== History ==
In 2002, after breaking up their band of seven years due to musical differences, Fenix TX singer/guitarist Will Salazar and the remaining three Fenix TX members went separate ways. While Salazar wanted to keep the band going (but was not legally allowed to), bassist Adam Lewis and drummer Damon DeLaPaz decided to extend their side-project Big Black Boat, which later changed its name to ChChCh HaHaHa and ultimately became the band I Sing the Body Electric. Guitarist Chris Lewis was caught in between, as he was asked to take part in Big Black Boat but also wanted to continue working with Salazar, and finally settled for a position alongside Salazar. Joined by F.O.N. members and brothers Aaron Rubin on bass and Ilan Rubin on drums – the latter of which was a protégé of Blink-182 drummer and reality TV star Travis Barker — the duo formed Denver Harbor in December 2002, three months after Fenix TX broke up.

The band made its stage debut on March 14, 2003 at The Scene in San Diego, California. They recorded three songs in their home studio ("All I Want", "Move On" and a cover version of Avril Lavigne's "I'm with You"), that were uploaded onto MP3.com to help spread the word. Within weeks, they had a solid fanbase, mainly former Fenix TX fans. Following a stint of intimate club shows, Denver Harbor returned to the recording studio with producer Joe Marlett, to work on the songs that would become their debut EP [Extended Play (2003). Fans voted the EP's single "Outta My Head" to the top of KEDJ 103.9 The Edge's online chart, securing the band a spot in front of a crowd of 20,000 on the radio station's Edgefest, hosted on September 20, 2003. Extended Play was released under the band's own imprint, called Angry Pirate Records, on December 16, 2003. Throughout 2003 and 2004, the release was promoted by tours with Sugarcult, Story of the Year, Me First and the Gimme Gimmes and Flogging Molly, helping the CD's first print run to sell out within half a year.

In June 2004, the band was signed by Universal Records. The band released their full-length debut Scenic on October 12, 2004. Musically, the album was much more diverse than Fenix TX's material, with influences ranging from post-grunge to reggae to pop rock, although the band's pop punk roots were also clearly audible. However, due to Universal's lack of promotion, the album did not manage to chart the Billboard 200, which ultimately led to the label dropping the band exactly one year after their signing. After that, things quieted down around the quartet until, in September 2005, Fenix TX reunited for a final tour. While Fenix TX and Allister co-headlined the tour, Day at the Fair, Houston Calls and Denver Harbor supported, which meant that Salazar, Chris Lewis and eventually Ilan Rubin – who would replace Fenix TX drummer DeLaPaz halfway through the tour – had to play two sets every night. Denver Harbor finally went their separate ways in 2006. Drummer Ilan Rubin then went on to play for Welsh alternative metal band Lostprophets before becoming the drummer for Nine Inch Nails.

== Members ==
- Will Salazar – vocals, guitar
- Chris Lewis – guitar
- Aaron Rubin – bass
- Ilan Rubin – drums

== Discography ==
=== Albums ===
- Scenic (2004)

=== EPs ===
- Extended Play (2003)

=== Non-album tracks ===
- "I'm with You" – released on Boys on Top: A Punk Rock Tribute to Avril Lavigne (2004)
