= Coup (album) =

Studio album by The New Regime
- Released: November 18th 2008
- Recorded: 2007–2008
- Genre: Alternative rock
- Length: 42:43
- Producer: Ilan Rubin, Aaron Rubin

Professional ratings
Review scores
Source	Rating
Ultimate Guitar	(8.3/10)

Coup is the debut album by The New Regime, a solo project by Ilan Rubin, the former drummer of Lostprophets and current drummer of Foo Fighters and Angels and Airwaves. In addition to songs previously released on his Myspace page, he recorded two more songs for this album, as well as singing and playing all the instruments by himself for the entirety of it.

It was released on November 18, 2008, as a digital download on digital music stores such as iTunes, Amazon and eMusic. It was also released as a free download on the official Nine Inch Nails web site.

== Track listing ==
1. "The Collapse" - 5:14
2. "Order Restored" - 5:07
3. "All These Changes" - 4:42
4. "Take Control" - 3:58
5. "Time Erase" - 3:01
6. "Haunt My Mind" - 4:03
7. "This War Time" - 3:58
8. "The Credit "We" Deserve" - 4:51
9. "Tap Dancing In A Minefield" - 4:04
10. "Somethings" - 3:47

== Personnel ==
- Ilan Rubin - drums, vocals, piano, keyboards, guitars, bass guitar, lyrics, production
- Aaron Rubin - produced, engineered, mixed
