= Rebel Girl (Angels & Airwaves song) =

Single by Angels & Airwaves

from the album Lifeforms
- Released: April 30, 2019
- Length: 3:46
- Label: Rise
- Songwriter(s): Tom DeLonge; Ilan Rubin; Aaron Rubin
- Producer(s): Angels & Airwaves; Aaron Rubin

Angels & Airwaves singles chronology
| "Chasing Shadows" (2016) | "Rebel Girl" (2019) | "All That's Left Is Love" (2020) |

"Rebel Girl" is a song by the American rock band, Angels & Airwaves. The song was released on April 30, 2019, as the first single for their album, Lifeforms, and is their first music release through Rise Records. The song was written by Tom DeLonge, Ilan Rubin, and Aaron Rubin.

== Background ==
Prior to recording Lifeforms, DeLonge had become invested in numerous projects, many of which centered around his company, To the Stars, but began to tease that they were recording new music from early 2018 to early 2019 through their social media accounts. These teasers also revealed that David Kennedy and Matt Wachter, who had been absent in the band since their previous album, The Dream Walker, had rejoined Angels & Airwaves. Despite this news, neither Kennedy nor Wachter were involved in the recording of the track, though Kennedy received credit as a producer.

DeLonge described "Rebel Girl" as "a space-age love song that combines my enduring obsession for new wave, pop punk and anthemic rock and roll music". The instrumentals show to be more akin to the band's style before the release of The Dream Walker, with DeLonge stating that it and the album are "going to be way more in the direction of I-Empire".

== Release and reception ==
"Rebel Girl" was released alongside multiple announcements from Angels & Airwaves. With its release, the band confirmed both their recording contract with Rise Records, and their current line-up of DeLonge, Kennedy, and Rubin. Additionally, they also announced their first concert tour since 2012 in support of the song and album.

Critically, the song was met with mostly positive feedback. Graham Hartmann of Loudwire felt that the song "stays true to AVA’s synth pop style with classic Blink-182 catchiness" while also noting that "DeLonge's unmistakable voice brings the track through a futuristic, yet familiar sound". Jon Blistein of Rolling Stone called it "a pulsing love song that finds DeLonge bellowing over a melange of synth sounds".

== Music video ==
A music video for "Rebel Girl" was released on August 20, 2019, and featured at the time touring bassist, Matt Rubano, before he was made an official member of the band. The video depicts a teenage boy named Tommy in a bedroom with a girl who is his friend and crush, while the band is shown playing on a small TV inside a room with flashing red and blue lights. While the girl prepares for a date with someone else, Tommy fantasizes about her and the two of them being in a relationship. After she leaves for her date, Tommy reads her diary and discovers that she doesn't feel the same way, which prompts him to destroy her bedroom and relentlessly beat himself, leaving the room splattered with his own blood.

== Track listing ==
- Digital download
1. "Rebel Girl" – 3:46

== Personnel ==
Angels & Airwaves

- Tom DeLonge – vocals, guitars, synthesizers, songwriting, producer
- Ilan Rubin – drums, backing vocals, guitars, bass guitar, synthesizers, songwriting, producer
- David Kennedy – producer

Production

- Aaron Rubin – producer, songwriting, engineer
- Ben Moore – engineer
- Tony Hoffer – mixing
- Tom Baker – mastering engineer

== Charts ==
| Chart (2019) | Peak position |
|---|---|
| US Alternative Airplay (Billboard) | 31 |
