= Euphoria (Angels & Airwaves song) =

Single by Angels & Airwaves

from the album Lifeforms
- Released: May 19, 2021
- Genre: Post-hardcore
- Length: 4:24
- Label: Rise
- Songwriters: Tom DeLonge; Ilan Rubin; Matt Rubano; Aaron Rubin
- Producers: Tom DeLonge; Ilan Rubin; Matt Rubano; Aaron Rubin

Angels & Airwaves singles chronology
"Paper Thin" (2020)	"Euphoria" (2021)	"Restless Souls" (2021)

"Euphoria" is a song by the American rock band, Angels & Airwaves. The song was released on May 19, 2021, as the second single for their album, Lifeforms. It also marks the band's first release with bassist Matt Rubano as an official member. The song was written by Tom DeLonge, Ilan Rubin, Rubano, and Aaron Rubin.

== Background ==
In 2019 Angels & Airwaves embarked on their first concert tour since 2012, which featured former Taking Back Sunday bassist, Matt Rubano, in place of former bassist, Matt Wachter, who had left the band without announcement. Shortly after, the band's frontman, Tom DeLonge, began sharing videos and pictures on social media of Rubano writing and recording with band, confirming that he was now an official member.

Unlike most of the band's previous releases, "Euphoria" takes a much more aggressive and post-hardcore inspired direction with its instrumentals. In a press statement DeLonge said that he felt modern music was severely lacking in "guitars, angst, and emotional authenticity", and wanted to create a song that was reminiscent of the music from his youth. Prior to the song's release, DeLonge had also made numerous social media posts saying that the upcoming album would take inspiration from his and guitarist David Kennedy's previous band, Box Car Racer, which has also been cited as having a post-hardcore sound.

When asked about the song's meaning, DeLonge stated that "this song shows the seductive nature of an intense love built with that baggage from our youth, from being born into an imperfect household".

== Release and reception ==
"Euphoria" was released alongside the band announcing two headlining shows in New York City and Los Angeles, and an appearance at Lollapalooza 2021.

The song was met with mostly positive feedback. Chad Childers of Loudwire felt that the song "has a little more bite" than the band's previous releases, which he felt were more hypnotic and futuristic, while Tom Skinner of NME called the song "explosive".

Shortly after the release of Lifeforms, "Euphoria" was added as downloadable content for the video game, Rock Band.

== Music video ==
DeLonge directed the music video for "Euphoria", which was released on the same day as the song. The video depicts a romantic relationship between a young woman and a man who works at Area 51. The woman seduces the man before stealing a key card for the base and giving it to a mystery man on a motorcycle, all while the band plays in a different setting.

== Track listing ==
- Digital download
1. "Euphoria" – 4:24

== Personnel ==
Angels & Airwaves

- Tom DeLonge – vocals, guitars, synthesizers, songwriting, producer
- Ilan Rubin – drums, guitars, synthesizers, songwriting, producer
- Matt Rubano – bass guitar, songwriting, producer

Production

- Aaron Rubin – producer, songwriting, engineer
- Emily Lazar - engineer
- Rich Costey - mixing
