= Paper Thin (Illenium, Tom DeLonge and Angels & Airwaves song) =

2020 song by Illenium, Tom DeLonge and Angels & Airwaves

Single by Illenium, Tom DeLonge and Angels & Airwaves

from the album Fallen Embers
- Released: October 23, 2020
- Genre: EDM; pop-punk; melodic dubstep
- Length: 3:17
- Label: Warner Records
- Songwriters: Nicholas Miller; Aaron Rubin; Colin Dieden; Elijah Noll; Pete Nappi; Tom DeLonge
- Producers: Illenium; Tom DeLonge

Illenium singles chronology
"Nightlight" (2020)	"Paper Thin" (2020)	"Hearts on Fire" (2020)

Angels & Airwaves singles chronology
"All That's Left Is Love" (2020)	"Paper Thin" (2020)	"Euphoria" (2021)

Music video
- "Paper Thin" on YouTube

"Paper Thin" is a song by American DJ and producer Illenium with American musician Tom DeLonge and his band Angels & Airwaves. It was released on October 23, 2020, as Illenium's second song on 12 Tone Music and Warner Records. It is the second single off his fourth studio album Fallen Embers.

== Background ==
Illenium said: "I got to collaborate with one of my favourite artists ever, Tom DeLonge. I feel like it has the nostalgic pop-punk vibes but also really incorporates my sound. I think the blend sounds amazing and I'm so stoked with how this one turned out!"

== Music video ==
Illenium told about the video: “In a post-apocalyptic world that is being threatened by an unknown enemy, the “Paper Thin” video exists as a parallel storyline to the “Nightlight” video. Our protagonists find comfort in each other and find meaning in the beautiful things not yet destroyed as they attempt to survive in this new universe.”

The video premiered on December 10, 2020.

== Charts ==
Chart (2020)	Peak position
US Hot Dance/Electronic Songs (Billboard)	10
US Hot Rock & Alternative Songs (Billboard)	23
