= All That's Left Is Love =

Single by Angels & Airwaves
- Released: April 16, 2020
- Length: 4:05
- Label: Rise
- Songwriters: Tom DeLonge; Ilan Rubin; Aaron Rubin
- Producers: Aaron Rubin; Angels & Airwaves

Angels & Airwaves singles chronology
"Rebel Girl" (2019)	"All That's Left Is Love" (2020)	"Paper Thin" (2020)

"All That's Left Is Love" is a song by the American rock band Angels & Airwaves. The song was released on April 16, 2020, as a non-album single, though it was included as a bonus track on the Japanese edition of Lifeforms (2021). The song was written by Tom DeLonge, Ilan Rubin, and Aaron Rubin.

== Background ==
"All That's Left Is Love" was written about the global impact of the COVID-19 pandemic, and about being optimistic about the future and the "positive side of humanity".

== Release and reception ==
The song was released on April 16, 2020, following a premiere on Apple Music's Beats 1 radio station. It was announced that all proceeds from the song would be donated to the nonprofit organization Feeding America's COVID-19 relief fund.

The song was met with mostly positive feedback. Billboard's Gil Kaufman felt that the song's second verse "pretty well sums up what a lot of us are feeling these days" in reference to the social impact of the pandemic. Josiah Hughes of Exclaim! called the song "another inspiring piece of uplifting alt pop. The song is four minutes long, but never overstays its welcome as it builds and expands." Emily Tan of SPIN felt that it "starts off slow, but then grows into a pretty empowering anthem."

== Music video ==
DeLonge released a teaser for a music video on his Instagram on June 23, 2020. He said that the original intention for the video was to represent hope of overcoming COVID-19, but that it also represented the band's support of the Black community in the United States in response to the George Floyd protests.

The video was released on June 25, 2020. Delonge is seen singing and dancing to the song by himself in various locations, to represent the feelings of isolation caused by the pandemic.

== Track listing ==
- Digital download
1. "All That's Left Is Love" – 4:05

== Personnel ==
Angels & Airwaves

- Tom DeLonge – vocals, guitar, synthesizers, songwriting, producer
- Ilan Rubin – drums, backing vocals, guitars, bass guitar, keyboards, songwriting, producer
- David Kennedy – producer

Production

- Aaron Rubin – producer, songwriting, engineer
- Ben Moore – engineer
- Tony Hoffer – engineer
- Tom Baker – engineer
- Tom Lord Alge - mix engineer
