= Chasing Shadows (EP) =

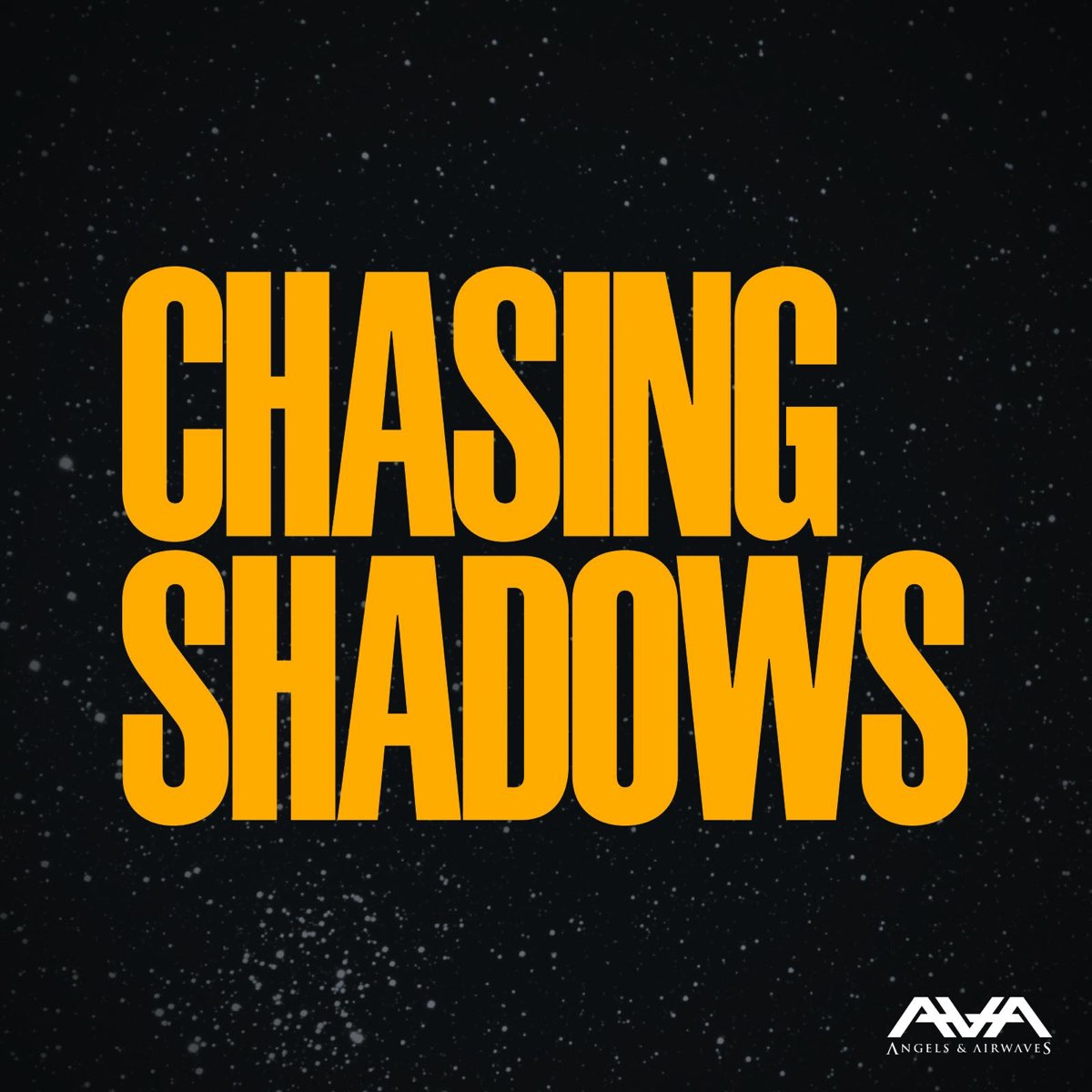

EP by Angels & Airwaves
- Released: April 8, 2016
- Genre: Rock
- Length: 16:11
- Label: To the Stars
- Producer: Tom DeLonge; Aaron Rubin

Angels & Airwaves chronology
...Of Nightmares (2015)	Chasing Shadows (2016)	We Don't Need to Whisper Acoustic - EP (2017)

Chasing Shadows is the third EP by American alternative rock band Angels & Airwaves, released on April 8, 2016, through To the Stars. Similar to the ...Of Nightmares EP, Chasing Shadows is a companion piece to the first book in the Sekret Machines series, co-written by Tom DeLonge and A. J. Hartley. Along with the EP is a planned documentary series. It was the second EP released by the band following DeLonge's exit from Blink-182, before his return in late 2022.

== Background ==
The Sekret Machines project is about "Unidentified Aerial Phenomena". The project blends sources from the "military and intelligence community" with a "story about people across the world and history who have seen something impossible lighting up the night sky." DeLonge described the novel as the "outcome of many secret meetings across the United States with government officials" and compared the music to the band's earlier material.

The sound of the EP steps away from the more electronic elements of the band into more guitar-driven rock, leading many to compare the songs to the sound of DeLonge's original band Blink-182, which he returned to in late 2022. The band live debuted the track "Overload" at the first show of their comeback tour in 2019 at Solana Beach alongside debut performances of many tracks from the band's previous album The Dream Walker.

== Track listing ==
All music is composed by Tom DeLonge and Ilan Rubin.

No.	Title	Length
1.	"Overload"	3:29
2.	"Artillery"	3:31
3.	"Voyager"	3:57
4.	"Chasing Shadows"	5:14
Total length:		16:11

== Personnel ==
Credits adapted from Discogs.

Angels & Airwaves

- Tom DeLonge – lead vocals, guitar, synths, bass guitar, producer
- Ilan Rubin – drums

Additional personnel

- Aaron Rubin – producer, mixing, engineering
- Tom Baker – mastering

== Charts ==
Chart (2016)	Peak position
US Billboard 200	109
US Independent Albums (Billboard)	8
US Top Alternative Albums (Billboard)	10
US Top Rock Albums (Billboard)	13
