= ...Of Nightmares =

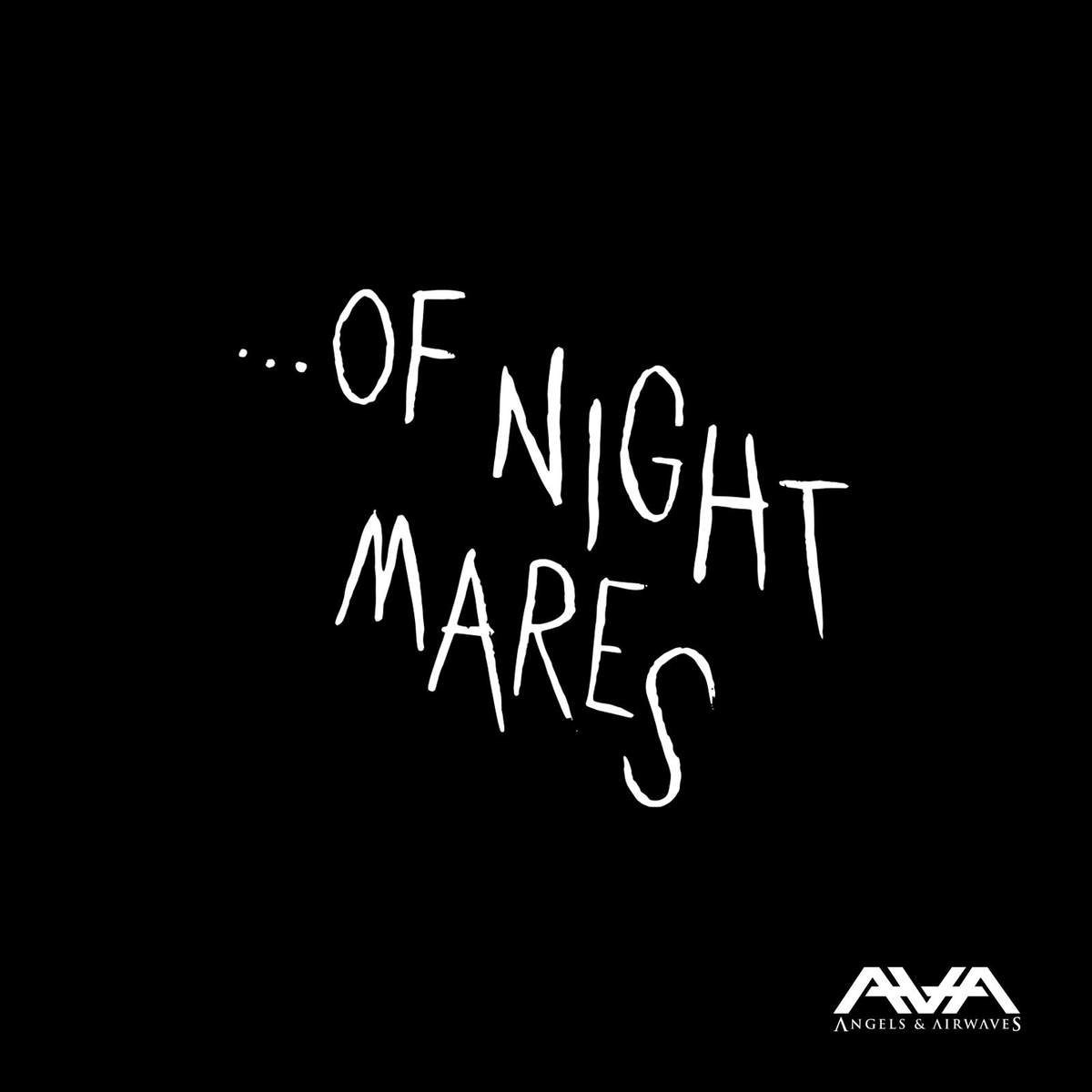

EP by Angels & Airwaves
- Released: September 4, 2015
- Length: 17:19
- Label: To the Stars

Angels & Airwaves chronology
The Dream Walker (2014)	...Of Nightmares (2015)	Chasing Shadows (2016)

...Of Nightmares is the second EP by alternative rock band Angels & Airwaves, released on September 4, 2015, through To the Stars. The EP is a companion piece to the novel written by Tom DeLonge and Suzanne Young, Poet Anderson... Of Nightmares, which is a part of the Poet Anderson franchise, also including The Dream Walker.

== Production ==
The band released the track "Into the Night" on August 21, 2015 on Rolling Stone magazine's website. Tom DeLonge said about the track, "'Into the Night' is about walking the person you love through a nightmare, I believe that we all encounter those we love in our dreams all of the time." On September 3, 2015 they released the track "Home" on Billboard.

DeLonge said about the EP, "When we thought about, 'How would the music work with (the novel)?,' it was best for us to do something that was just very left of center, an art project in and of its own and something that was totally experimental for us. I think there's, like, one normal song on the EP; the rest of it was meant to just be really pushing the envelope, something that is unorthodox, at least for Angels & Airwaves. These are not songs I wrote in my living room and said, 'Let's go in and record these verses and choruses.' We didn't do it that way."

Unlike previous albums from the band, The Dream Walker does not feature any electronic interludes. The band wanted the four tracks on the EP to serve as the missing interludes.

== Track listing ==
All music is composed by Tom DeLonge and Ilan Rubin.

No.	Title	Length
1.	"Home"	4:27
2.	"Into the Night"	4:19
3.	"View from Below"	3:33
4.	"Parasomnia"	5:00
Total length:		17:19
