= The Dream Walker =

Studio album by Angels & Airwaves
- Released: December 9, 2014
- Recorded: June 2013 – October 2014
- Studios: Jupiter Sound, San Diego, California
- Genre: Space rock
- Length: 40:05
- Label: To the Stars
- Producers: Tom DeLonge, Aaron Rubin

Angels & Airwaves chronology
Love: Part Two (2011)	The Dream Walker (2014)	...Of Nightmares (2015)

Angels & Airwaves studio album chronology
Love: Part Two (2011)	The Dream Walker (2014)	Lifeforms (2021)

Singles from The Dream Walker
- 1. "The Wolfpack" Released: October 31, 2014; 2. "Bullets in the Wind" Released: November 17, 2014; 3. "Tunnels" Released: December 1, 2014

The Dream Walker is the fifth studio album by alternative rock band Angels & Airwaves, released on December 9, 2014, through To the Stars. The album marks major changes in the band's lineup and production, as it is their first album to feature drummer Ilan Rubin, the first since We Don't Need to Whisper to not feature bassist Matt Wachter and the only album not to feature guitarist David Kennedy. It is also their first without longtime producer, Jeff “Critter” Newell, who died in 2012. It is instead co-produced by DeLonge and Aaron Rubin.

Originally intended to be titled Poet, The Dream Walker proved to be a remarkable shift in style from progressive styles to a rawer sounding alternative rock. Lyrically, it is a concept album that focuses heavily on exploring and understanding dreams. The album was recorded entirely by DeLonge and Rubin, who both took on multiple instruments during the process. On May 4, 2016, the band released a new album consisting entirely of demos from The Dream Walker studio sessions including older takes and five previously unreleased tracks.

== Background ==
Coming into recording with Rubin as the band's new drummer, DeLonge wanted to "do something that is a left turn from what people know of Angels and Airwaves," while also being eager to explore the concept of dreams for a long time. Following the Love project, he felt that many of the songs had begun to sound the same, and wanted to take a major shift in style by bringing in new people for the songwriting and production. This resulted in DeLonge and Rubin being the only composers on the album, while also bringing in Rubin's brother, Aaron, as the band's new producer.

Much of The Dream Walker's recording focused on DeLonge and Rubin learning about how each other record. This resulted in letting Rubin do most of the composition while DeLonge acted as the primary lyricist, but also acted as a co-composer. During the production, DeLonge heavily praised Rubin's talent as a musician:

“Ilan is the best multi-instrumentalist I’ve met in my life. He plays drums with Nine Inch Nails and he’s an incredible drummer, but he’s better at guitar than I am and he’s the best piano player that I’ve ever seen in my life! I grew up in a punk rock scene that was built as a vehicle to express emotion, but Ilan grew up as a fanboy of Led Zeppelin, The Beatles and Queen. When you mix those two worlds together, musically it became much more diverse. Ilan is the kind of guy that’ll sit there and read a manual until 4 in the morning on how to create his own synthesizer sound through a bunch of oscillators and I’m the kind of guy that’ll throw a bunch of paint on a canvas and go, ‘Wow, that’s fucking cool!’ so we’re polar opposites and I think that’s why we became a really good pairing.” - Tom DeLonge

Much of this recording process was documented for a video series on the band's YouTube channel. While Kennedy and new bassist, Eddie Breckenridge, were not part of the process, DeLonge confirmed that they were still involved with the band, but via non-recording duties.

== Release ==
The Dream Walker was a part of a multimedia project titled Poet Anderson, which also included a comic book, short film, novel, and the band's following EP ...Of Nightmares. The project was officially announced on October 6, 2014 with the release of the album's promotional single, "Paralyzed." This announcement also included a teaser for October 31 of that year, which would be the beginning of official releases for the project. This eventually became the release of the album's first single, "The Wolfpack," on that day, which was followed by its corresponding music video on November 14, 2014. Additional singles, "Bullets in the Wind" and "Tunnels", were released on November 17, 2014 and December 3, 2014 respectively.

The short film that coincides with the album, Poet Anderson: The Dream Walker, premiered on November 14 at the Toronto International Short Film Festival, for which it won Best Animation.

== Critical reception ==
Professional ratings
Aggregate scores
Source	Rating
Metacritic	66/100
Review scores
Source	Rating
AllMusic	3/5 stars
Alter the Press!	4/5 stars
Alternative Press	4.5/5 stars
DIY	2/5 stars
inveterate.co.uk	7/10
KillYourStereo	93/100
Rock Industry	8/10
Rock Sound	7/10
Rolling Stone	4/5 stars

The Dream Walker received generally positive reviews from music critics. At Metacritic, which assigns a weighted average out of 100 to reviews from mainstream critics, the album has received an average score of 66, based on 6 reviews, indicating "generally favorable" feedback. Stephen Thomas Erlewine of AllMusic rated the album three out of five stars, writing that it has "more texture and dimension than Love and, ultimately, it's that expansiveness that gives the album character instead of the convoluted cross-platform narratives." Tom Connick of DIY unfavorably described the album as "little more than an extended yawn of spacey synths".

== Commercial performance ==
The Dream Walker debuted at number 39 on the Billboard 200 with first week sales of 19,088 copies in the United States.

== Track listing ==
All tracks are written by Tom DeLonge and Ilan Rubin.

No.	Title	Length
1.	"Teenagers & Rituals"	3:53
2.	"Paralyzed"	4:09
3.	"The Wolfpack"	3:53
4.	"Tunnels"	4:10
5.	"Kiss with a Spell"	4:36
6.	"Mercenaries"	4:37
7.	"Bullets in the Wind"	4:03
8.	"The Disease"	3:57
9.	"Tremors"	3:55
10.	"Anomaly"	2:52
Total length:		40:05

== Personnel ==
Credits adapted from AllMusic

Angels & Airwaves

- Tom DeLonge – lead vocals, guitar, synths, bass guitar, producer
- Ilan Rubin – drums, percussion, piano, bass guitar, synths, guitar, vocals

Additional personnel

- Aaron Rubin – producer, engineer, mixing
- Tom Lord-Alge – mixing
- Alan Moulder – mixing
- Brian Gardner – mastering

== Charts ==
Chart (2014)	Peak position
UK Albums (Official Charts)	94
US Billboard 200	39
US Top Alternative Albums (Billboard)	5
Belgian Albums (Ultratop Flanders)	183
