= Ilan Rubin =

American musician (born 1988)

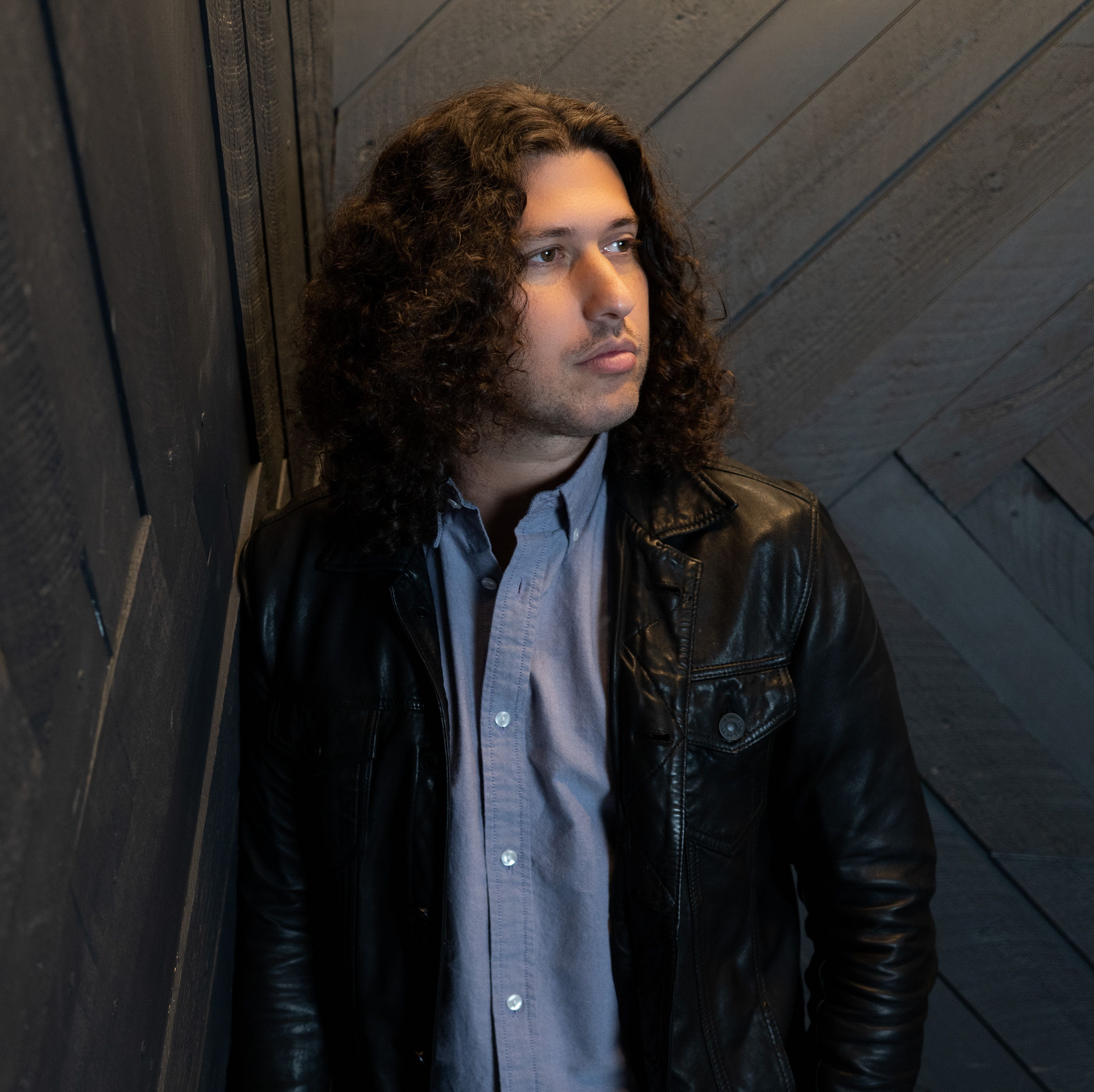
- Rubin in 2022

Background information
- Born: Ilan Samuel Rubin; July 7, 1988 (age 38); San Diego, California, U.S.
- Origin: San Diego, California, U.S.
- Genres: Alternative rock; industrial rock; pop rock; hard rock; alternative metal; pop; electronic
- Occupations: Musician; songwriter; producer; composer
- Instruments: Drums; percussion; guitar; keyboards; bass; cello; vocals
- Years active: 1999–present
- Member of: Angels & Airwaves; Foo Fighters
- Formerly of: The Jaded Hearts Club; Fenix TX; Denver Harbor; Lostprophets; Nine Inch Nails
- Website: ilanrubinmusic.com thenewregimemusic.com

Ilan Samuel Rubin (born July 7, 1988) is an American musician, producer, songwriter, and composer. He is the current drummer of Foo Fighters, having joined the band in 2025, replacing Josh Freese. Prior to this, he was known for playing drums with a variety of artists, including Nine Inch Nails, Paramore, Lostprophets, Angels & Airwaves and Danny Elfman. In 2008, he formed the New Regime, in which he sings and plays all instruments in the studio and plays guitar with a band for live performances. In 2021, he released music for the first time under his name.

In 2020, Rubin was inducted into the Rock and Roll Hall of Fame as a member of Nine Inch Nails, making him the youngest living inductee in its history. He is also the first Rock Hall inductee to be born in the 1980s, and the first to be born after the establishment of the Hall itself.

== Early life ==
Rubin was raised in San Diego, California. He began playing drums at eight when he discovered his father's 1968 Silver Sparkle Ludwig drum kit in the garage. After three months of "toying" with the kit, he had taught himself to play and was jamming with his older brothers. By age nine, he was ready to play for F.o.N., a band that eventually would do three stints on the Vans Warped Tour, where Rubin would also fill in on drums for bands such as NOFX. In 1999, F.o.N. opened Woodstock '99 on the Emerging Artist Stage; as a result, 11-year-old Rubin gained entry into the Guinness Book of World Records as the youngest musician to ever play on a Woodstock stage.

== Career ==
=== Lostprophets (2006–2008) ===
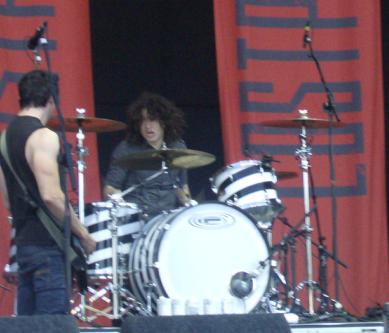
Rubin (right) performing with Lostprophets at the Leeds Festival 2007.

Rubin was the drummer for the Welsh band Lostprophets. He replaced Mike Chiplin, founding member and original drummer, who left the band in 2005. Before finding Rubin, Lostprophets hired session drummer Josh Freese to record the tracks on Liberation Transmission. After Rubin joined, he played the remaining two tracks on Liberation Transmission: "For All These Times Son, For All These Times" and "Everybody's Screaming!!!", as well as the entirety of The Betrayed.

While touring with Lostprophets, Rubin played his first shows in the United Kingdom and toured large arenas for the first time. Rubin would describe the transition from his previous smaller bands to arena shows as a "big step up", but stated that Lostprophets had become "stagnant" prior to his departure for Nine Inch Nails in 2008.

=== The New Regime (2007–2020) ===
Rubin's debut solo album, under the pseudonym 'The New Regime', called Coup, was recorded throughout 2007 and 2008 and released in November 2008. While touring with Nine Inch Nails and following the conclusion of the Wave Goodbye Tour, Rubin worked on his second album, Speak Through The White Noise, which was released in April 2011. Before this, Ilan released a free single titled 'Remission Of Guilt' through his website. It has been confirmed that this track will not be on the new album. In 2011, he went on Tour with Taking Back Sunday as an opening act. In 2013 and 2015, he released the two halves of his next project, Exhibit A and Exhibit B. On March 6, 2020, The New Regime released its fifth studio album, Heart Mind Body & Soul, featuring the singles "Turning a Blind Eye" and "Heart Mind Body & Soul." Over five months before its release, Rubin released three EPs (Heart, Mind, and Body), each with four songs from the upcoming album that fit the themes of the titles. The New Regime was on tour with Silversun Pickups in March 2020 to support the new album, which abruptly halted courtesy of the COVID pandemic and resulting shutdown. Just before that tour, "Heart Mind Body & Soul" was released, which included all of the material on the previously released EPs, a final EP called "Soul," plus some bonus material. The album was receiving critical praise just before the shutdown.

The New Regime Live Lineup: Ilan Rubin: vocals, piano, guitar, Kemble Walters: bass, vocals, Rob Ketchum: drums, vocals

=== Nine Inch Nails (2009–2025) ===
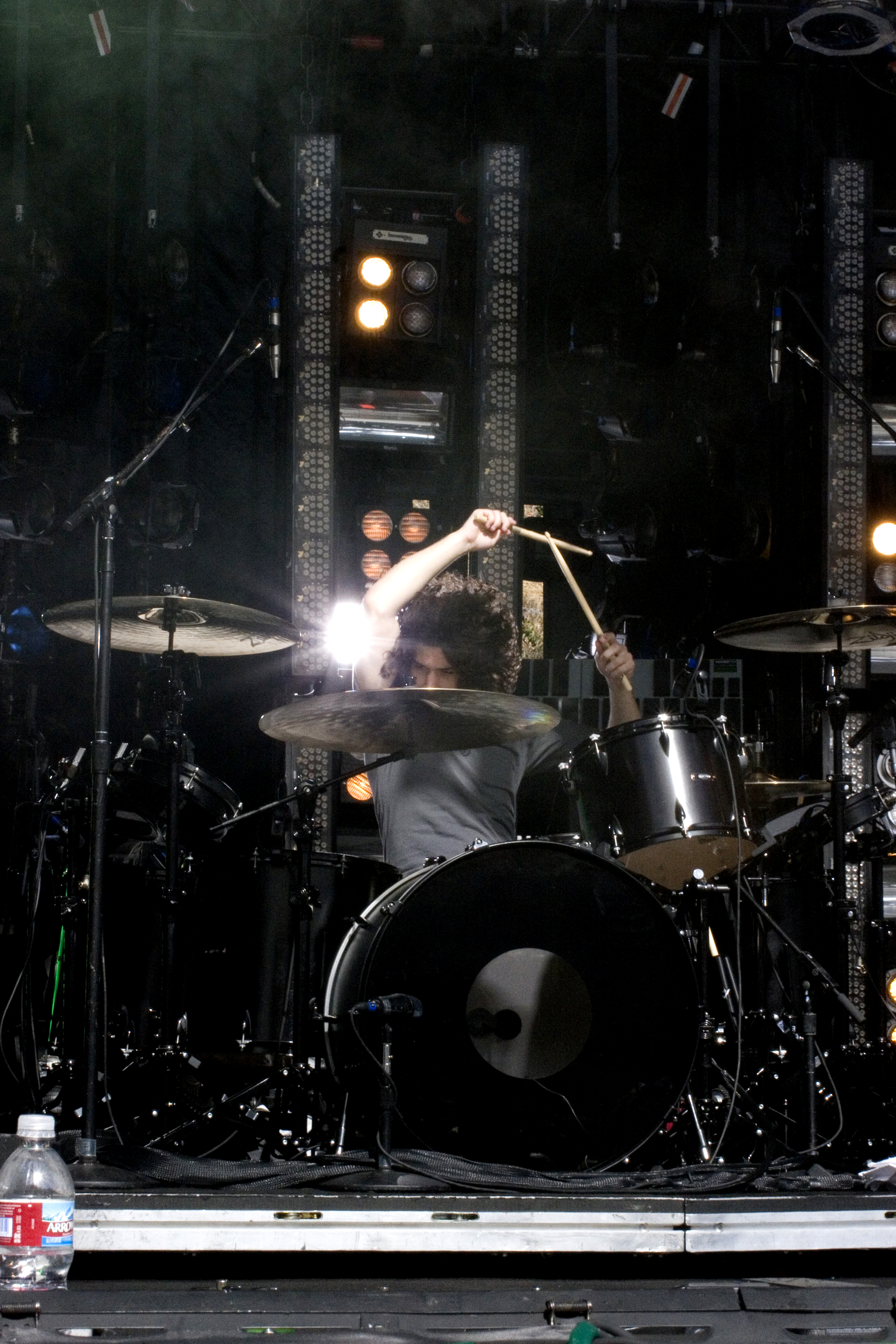
Rubin performs with Nine Inch Nails in Santa Barbara, California, 2009

On November 15, 2008, Trent Reznor announced via the Nine Inch Nails website that Rubin would be joining industrial rock band Nine Inch Nails as their drummer after the departure of Josh Freese in late 2008. Rubin's role in the live iteration of Nine Inch Nails grew to include playing piano, synths, bass, guitar, and even cello. Rubin was the longest tenured live drummer for the band. In July 2025, it was announced that Rubin would be leaving the band after his decision to join the Foo Fighters, replacing Freese. At the same time, Freese rejoined Nine Inch Nails, replacing Rubin's position.

=== Angels & Airwaves (2011–present) ===
In 2011, Rubin joined Angels & Airwaves, replacing drummer Atom Willard. He has appeared on all the band's studio releases since the 2014 album The Dream Walker. Rubin acts a multi-instrumentalist for the group during recording and frontman Tom DeLonge has credited him as a major contributor to the band's songwriting process.

=== Paramore (2012–2013) ===
On June 28, 2012, Paramore confirmed Rubin would drum on their fourth album, though he didn't join as an official member of the band. Rubin recorded all the drums on their self-titled album and joined them for its subsequent tour. The album went platinum and the song "Ain't It Fun" won a Grammy Award for Best Rock Song at the 57th Annual Grammy Awards.

=== Danny Elfman (2023–present) ===
On May 8, 2023, Danny Elfman announced that he would be doing two shows, one in Chula Vista, CA., and the other in Irvine, CA., entitled “From Boingo to Batman to Big Mess and Beyond!” In making that announcement, Elfman confirmed that Ilan Rubin would replace Josh Freese on drums.

=== Foo Fighters (2025–present) ===
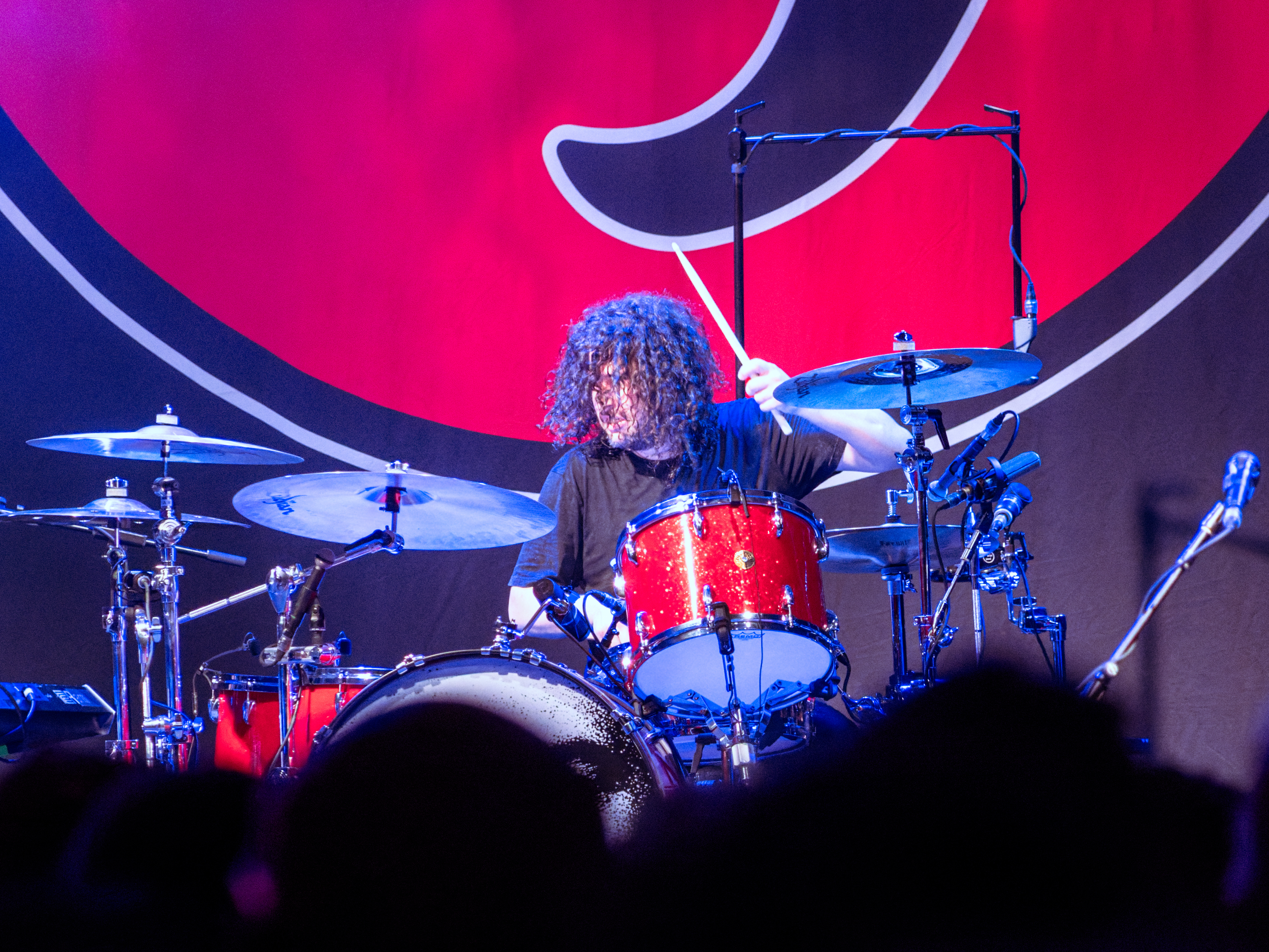
Rubin with Foo Fighters in 2026

On July 30, The Hollywood Reporter reported that Rubin would join the group, replacing Josh Freese. On September 13, Foo Fighters played their first show with Rubin on drums at the Fremont Theater in San Luis Obispo, California. At the show, Dave Grohl confirmed that Rubin would be the band's official drummer. "Asking for a Friend" was the first song featuring Rubin. He appeared on the band's album Your Favorite Toy, released on April 24, 2026.

=== Other Projects ===
In 2010 Rubin formed ...Students with The Transit War bassist Mike Frey, releasing their debut album New Habits later that year.

=== Film scores ===
Rubin has performed on multiple film scores and, starting during the COVID pandemic, began composing original film scores. Films he has scored include 2022's Bobcat Moretti and 2023's Monsters of California, the latter of which marked the directorial debut of his Angels & Airwaves bandmate Tom DeLonge. His work on Bobcat Moretti earned him a nomination for best original score at the Beaufort International Film Festival.

== Discography ==
Selected songwriting and production credits
Year	Artist	Album	Song	Role
2013	Angels & Airwaves	Stomping The Phantom Brake Pedal		Producer, Songwriter
2014	Angels & Airwaves	The Dream Walker		Producer, Songwriter
2020	The New Regime	Heart Mind Body and Soul		Artist, Producer, Songwriter
2020	Angels & Airwaves	All That's Left is Love – Single	"All That's Left is Love"	Producer, Songwriter
2021	Angels & Airwaves	Lifeforms		Producer, Songwriter
2022	Oliver Tree	Cowboys Tears	"Cowboy's Don't Cry" "The Villain"	Producer, Songwriter
2023	Jawny	It's Never Fair, Always True	"Adios"	Producer, Songwriter
2023	44phantom	Cherry Cigarettes – Single	Cherry Cigarettes	Producer, Songwriter
2023	BBGirls	One More Time - Single	"One More Time"	Producer, Songwriter
2024	Jazmin Bean	Traumatic Livelihood	"Black Dress"	Producer, Songwriter
2024	Friday Pilots Club	Nowhere	"Nosedive"	Songwriter
2024	Tatiana Hazel	Can Anybody Hear Me	"Better Off" "All Along"	Producer, Songwriter
2024	Bleu Grave	Bleu Grave, Vol 2, - EP	"In Exile" "Television Tell Me What To Do" "Her Projection" "Hollow"	Producer, Songwriter
2024	Atarashii Gakko!	AG Calling	"Superhuman"	Producer, Songwriter
2024	Sueco	Attempted Lover	"Outta My Head"	Producer, Songwriter
2025	Industrial Pulsar	Further Into The Gear	Forgotten	Drummer, Drum Arranger

Selected Session & Instrumental Credits
Year	Artist	Album	Song	Role
2003	Denver Harbor	Extended Play		Drums
2004	Denver Harbor	Scenic		Drums
2013	Paramore	Paramore		Drums
2013	M83	Oblivion [Original Motion Picture Soundtrack]	"Oblivion"	Drums
2013	Nine Inch Nails	Hesitation Marks		Drums & Percussion
2015	M83, Haim	Insurgent [Original Motion Picture Soundtrack]	“Holes In The Sky”	Drums
2016	Simple Plan	Taking One For The Team		Drums
2017	Beck	Colors		Drums
2020	Phantogram	Ceremony		Drums
2022	Frank Turner	FTHC	Tracks 1, 3–7, 9–12, 14	Drums
2023	Melanie Martinez	Portals	"Evil"	Drums
2024	Christophe Beck	Road House [Original Motion Picture Soundtrack]		Drums & Guitar

Original Film Score
Year	Film	Director	Principal Cast	Role
2022	Bobcat Moretti	Rob Margolies	Tim Realbuto, Vivica A. Fox, Taryn Manning, Coolio	Composer
2023	Monsters of California	Tom DeLonge	Jack Samson, Jack Lancaster, Jared Scott	Composer
2023	In Fidelity	Rob Margolies	Chris Parnell, Cara Buono, Dennis Haysbert	Composer
2024	Road House	Doug Liman	Jake Gyllenhaal, Conor McGregor	

As solo artist

- "Talk Talk Talk" - Single (2021)
- "Talk Talk Talk (Phantogram Remix)" - Single (2021)
- "Chaos in Motion" (2021)
- "Good Morning Good Morning" (The Beatles cover) (2022)
- "24HR Fix" (2022)
- "Living in the Underworld" (2022)
- "Don't Panic" (2023)
- "Room for Two" (2023)
- "No Place Left To Go" (2023)
- "Get Out While You Can" (2023)
- "Looming" (2024)

With Nine Inch Nails

- Hesitation Marks (2013)

With Angels & Airwaves

- The Dream Walker (2014)
- ... Of Nightmares (2015)
- Chasing Shadows (2016)
- Lifeforms (2021)

With the New Regime

- "Eleanor Rigby" (The Beatles cover) (2007)
- Coup (2008)
- Remission of Guilt (2010)
- Speak Through The White Noise (2011)
- Exhibit A (2013)
- Exhibit B (2015)
- Heart Mind Body & Soul (2020)

With Foo Fighters

- Your Favorite Toy (2026)

With ...Students

- New Habits (2010)
