= Fall Creek =

Fall Creek may refer to:

== In the United States ==
=== Streams ===
- Fall Creek (San Mateo County, California)
- Fall Creek (San Lorenzo River), Santa Cruz County, California
- Fall Creek (Indiana)
- Fall Creek (Missouri)
- Fall Creek (Cape Fear River tributary), a stream in Lee County, North Carolina
- Fall Creek (Middle Fork Willamette River), in Oregon
- Fall Creek (New York), in Ithaca, New York

=== Other water bodies ===
- Fall Creek Falls (Texas), a waterfall of Lake Buchanan (Texas)
- Fall Creek Lake in Oregon

=== Populated places ===
- Fall Creek, Illinois, an unincorporated community and census-designated place, Illinois
- Fall Creek, Ithaca, a neighborhood in Ithaca, New York
- Fall Creek, Texas, a neighborhood in Harris County, Texas
- Fall Creek, Wisconsin, a village

== See also ==
- Fall Creek Township (disambiguation)
- Fall Brook (disambiguation)
- Fall River (disambiguation)
- Falls River (disambiguation)
