= Fall River =

Fall River may refer to:

== Places ==
=== Canada ===
- Fall River, Nova Scotia

=== United States ===
- Fall River, Massachusetts
  - Fall River station, a commuter rail station in Fall River, Massachusetts
- Fall River, Kansas
- Fall River County, South Dakota
- Fall River, Tennessee, site of a National Register of Historic Places listing in Lawrence County, Tennessee
- Fall River, Wisconsin

== Rivers ==
=== Canada ===
- Fall River (Ontario)

=== United States ===
- Fall River (Plumas County, California), a Lake Oroville source tributary
- Fall River (Shasta County, California), a river tributary to the Pit River in Shasta County, California.
- Fall River (Clear Creek County, Colorado), a tributary of Clear Creek in Clear Creek County, Colorado.
- Fall River (Larimer County, Colorado), a tributary of the Big Thompson River in Larimer County, Colorado
- Fall River (Henrys Fork tributary), a river in Yellowstone National Park and Idaho
- Fall River (Fremont County, Idaho), a river in Fremont County, Idaho
- Fall River (Kansas), a river in Wilson County, Kansas
- Fall River (Maryland), a river in Baltimore, Maryland
- Fall River (Connecticut River tributary), a river in Franklin County, Massachusetts
- Fall River (Farmington River), a river in Berkshire County, Massachusetts
- Fall River (Middle Fork Feather River), a tributary of the Middle Fork Feather River in Butte County, California
- Fall River (Minnesota), a stream in northeastern Minnesota
- Fall River (Oregon), a tributary of the Deschutes River in central Oregon
- Fall River (South Dakota), a river in Fall River County
- Hoback River or Fall River, a river in Wyoming

== Other ==
- Fall River, Warren and Providence Railroad, a railroad in southeastern Massachusetts and Rhode Island
- Fall River murders, three murders committed from October 1979 to February 1980 in Fall River, Massachusetts
- Fall River (TV series), a 2021 Epix documentary series about the murders
- "Fall River" (short story), a 1931 short story by John Cheever

== See also ==
- Falls River (disambiguation)
- Fall Creek (disambiguation)
- Fall Brook (disambiguation)
