= 40 Years of Fuckin' Up =

2026 documentary about NOFX

- Directed by: James Buddy Day
- Produced by: Fat Mike
- Music by: Fat Mike
- Production company: Pyramid Productions
- Release date: March 2026 (SXSW)
- Running time: 124 minutes
- Countries: United States; Canada
- Language: English

40 Years of Fuckin' Up is a 2026 documentary film about the punk band NOFX. It was directed by James Buddy Day and produced through Pyramid Productions. The film was scored by Fat Mike.

The film was shown at SF DocFest. In addition to the band, the film features interviews with Bad Religion, Fishbone, The Offspring, Pennywise, and Wil Wheaton. An early showing was an "unlikely test screening at a fetish event in the Caribbean", and the film premiered at SXSW 2026.

Billy Eff of Rolling Stone Canada says the film's dynamic "creates ambiguity around blame, forcing viewers to sit with conflicting perspectives rather than guiding them toward a resolution." Bob Strauss of SF Chronicle says "The guys' affection for one another (though now strained in some cases), their fans and their uncompromising punk attitude, which they've somehow managed to profit handsomely from, crackles through sometimes contradictory, separate interviews."

Rae Alexandria of KQED said "One of the most remarkable things about 40 Years of Fuckin' Up is that it is wildly entertaining throughout, whether or not you find Fat Mike profoundly irritating."

NOFX opted not to sell the documentary to any streaming service, instead making it a theater only experience.

== Soundtrack ==
40 Years of Fuckin' Up: Soundtrack + Score

Soundtrack album by NOFX
- Released: August 28, 2026
- Recorded: 1986-2026
- Genre: Skate Punk
- Length: 1:14:00
- Label: Fat Wreck Chords

NOFX chronology
Half Album (2024)	40 Years of Fuckin' Up: Soundtrack + Score (2026)

Singles from 40 Years of Fuckin' Up: Soundtrack + Score
- 1. "40 Years of Fuckin' Up" Released: 21 May 2026; 2. "Kids of The K-Hole" Released: 15 July 2026

A soundtrack for the album was released on vinyl and streaming coinciding with the films release. The soundtrack has two parts, the first consisting of NOFX songs, most of them being pulled from other albums and some being made for the film (making them the last tracks ever recorded by the band), the second consisting of string arrangements composed by Fat Mike, several being renditions of NOFX songs.

Side A

All tracks are written by NOFX.

No.	Title	Length
1.	"40 Years of Fuckin' Up" (Originally released as a single)	3:35
2.	"Drugs Are Good" (Originally released on HOFX)	2:18
3.	"Lazy" (Originally released on 45 or 46 Songs That Weren't Good Enough to Go on Our Other Records, cover of Bracket)	3:02
4.	"On the Road (recorded in Omaha in 1986)" (Previously Unreleased)	2:34
5.	"We're Bros" (Previously Unreleased)	1:02
6.	"Separation of Church and Skate" (Originally released on The War On Errorism)	2:49
7.	"La Bamba" (Previously Unreleased)	1:18
8.	"Linoleum (live)" (Originally released on I Heard They Suck Live!!, live version of track from Punk In Drublic)	2:09
9.	"Suits and Ladders" (Originally released on Coaster)	3:03
10.	"Secret Society (demo)" (Previously Unreleased)	2:54
11.	"We Called It America" (Originally released on Coaster)	2:01
12.	"Punk Rock Cliché" (Acoustic cover of track from Single Album)	3:57
13.	"Fermented and Flailing" (Originally released on Cokie the Clown)	2:40
14.	"NOFX (live 10/4/24)" (Previously Unreleased)	1:03
15.	"We Did It Our Way (live 10/6/24)" (Previously Unreleased)	3:37

Side B

All tracks are written by Fat Mike.

No.	Title	Length
1.	"Type One American Errorist"	4:35
2.	"Medio-Core" (Arrangement of track from Regaining Unconsciousness)	3:27
3.	"Wore Out The Soles Of My Party Boots" (Arrangement of track on The Greatest Songs Ever Written (By Us))	2:44
4.	"Where's My Slice Redux" (Arrangement of track from Ribbed)	1:20
5.	"The Desperations Gone" (Arrangement of track from So Long and Thanks For All the Shoes)	2:37
6.	"Herojuna in F Major" (Arrangement of track from Pump Up the Valuum)	3:44
7.	"Fair Leather Friends" (Arrangement of track from You're Welcome)	4:03
8.	"Kids of the K-Hole" (Arrangement of track from So Long and Thanks For All the Shoes)	3:10
9.	"Generation Z in Z Flat Minor" (Arrangement of track on First Ditch Effort)	4:45
10.	"I'm A Rat" (Arrangement of track from Half Album)	2:10
11.	"And Now We're Gone"	2:50
