= Late Gathering =

- Short story by John Cheever
- Country: United States
- Language: English

Publication
- Published in: Pagany
- Publication date: October–December 1931

"Late Gathering" is a work of short fiction by John Cheever first published in Pagany magazine in its October–December issue, 1931. The story is included in Thirteen Uncollected Stories by John Cheever (1994) published by Academy Chicago Publishers.

== Plot ==
"Late Gathering" unfolds in a New Hampshire summer hotel. The proprietor of the establishment, Amy, is anxious that her clientele will soon be departing when autumn arrives. She is troubled that many of her recent customers from the city bring their metropolitan habits to the country hotel—in particular, consuming alcohol freely—rather than finding comfort in the restful surroundings without imbibing.

One of the residents is a Russian woman, who declares upon the beauty of the Swiss countryside, though her knowledge of the region is likely based on color images of milk chocolate commercials. Her assertion that her son will soon arrive from a West Coast university is met with skepticism by the other residents. Two youthful brothers, Fred and Richard, spend the late summer days lounging outdoors far from the hotel. The other denizens of the hotel appear preoccupied with their own personal concerns at the gathering. A gramophone plays perpetually in the parlor.

== Critical assessment ==
"Late Gathering" marks a falling off from Cheever's early success with his first published work "Expelled" in 1930. Biographer Scott Donaldson notes that "...there is not much by way of characterization and no real drama. 'Late Gathering' risks making no statement whatever." According to critic John E. O'Hara, "Late Gathering" is "astonishing in [its] formlessness" and falls far short of Cheever's first published work "Expelled". In a monologue delivered by a Russian woman describing the beauty of the Swiss countryside, O'Hara discerns Cheever's "preoccupation with rhetorical flourish at the expense of credibility." The character declares:

"You have never seen the fields as I have. You do not know what a flowered meadow is. You have never walked into fields that are blue and white and yellow and every flower as perfect as the nipples on your breast."

Apparently, the woman has gleaned her knowledge of Switzerland from colorful milk chocolate advertisements.

O'Hara offers this excerpt from Cheever's preface to his 1978 collection The Stories of John Cheever concerning his early work:

"A writer can be seen clumsily learning to walk, to tie his necktie, to make love, to eat his peas off a fork. He appears much alone and determined to instruct himself. Naive (to dots over i), provincial in my case, sometimes drunk, sometimes obtuse…even a selected display of one's early work will be a naked history of one's struggle to receive an education in economics and love."

Critic George W. Hunt points out that Cheever's earliest fiction, among these "Late Gathering", are largely "woman-centered" in that the "intensely masculine perspective" characteristic of his later fiction is absent. Hunt writes:

"For the most part we meet independent, self-assured women as central characters. These females are the most sympathetically observed…they are given the best lines, endowed with genuine wit, and privy to the deepest sensations about life's mysteries."

== Sources ==
- Cheever, John. 1994. The Uncollected Stories of John Cheever. Edited by Franklin H. Dennis. Academy Chicago Publishers, Chicago. ISBN 0-89733-405-1
- Cheever, John. 2009. John Cheever: Collected Stories and Other Writing. The Library of America. ISBN 978-1-59853-034-6
- Donaldson, Scott. 1988. John Cheever: A Biography. Random House, New York. ISBN 0-394-54921-X
- Meanor, Patrick. 1995. John Cheever Revisited. Twayne Publishers, New York. ISBN 0-8057-3999-8
- O'Hara, James E. 1989. John Cheever: A Study of the Short Fiction. Twayne Publishers, Boston. Twayne Studies in Short Fiction no. 9. ISBN 0-8057-8310-5
- Hunt, George W. 1993. Introduction to Thirteen Uncollected Works by John Cheever. Chicago Academy Publishers. ISBN 0-89733-405-1
