= Expelled (short story) =

- Short story by John Cheever
- Country: United States
- Language: English

Publication
- Published in: The New Republic
- Publication date: October 1, 1930

"Expelled" is a short story by John Cheever published by The New Republic in 1930. The story appears in a collection of Cheever's short fiction, Thirteen Uncollected Stories by John Cheever, published in 1994 by Academy Chicago Publishers

An autobiographical piece, "Expelled" is Cheever's first published work of fiction.

== Plot ==
The story is written from the first-person point-of-view. Without making it explicit, the unnamed narrator is Cheever. The story begins In medias res. No clearly articulated plot develops.

A student at a prestigious prep school is summarily dismissed from the institution for poor academic performance during his junior year. He reflects upon the nature of his experience at the school, stressing his alienation and disaffection: the restrained analysis of the academic establishment is a covert but powerful indictment of the system. The narrator provides a number of vignettes of those educators who impressed him because they challenged the school administrators, expressed great enthusiasm for the subjects they taught, or deviated from the socially approved expressions of their personal suffering.

The story ends ambiguously. Now in exile, the former student struggles with the implications of his expulsion, a painful, but liberating right of passage that marks his entry into adulthood.

== Publication background ==
Cheever left the prestigious Thayer Academy in his junior year. The reason for his departure is not perfectly clear, as Cheever himself provided a number of unrelated versions including poor grades, smoking on campus, or homosexual encounters with some of his classmates. Reaction to the story came from a number of fronts, not least of which were parents of Thayer students and its faculty, who accused Cheever of "distortions." The school's headmaster, Stacy Baxter Southworth insisted that Cheever "was not expelled" but "left entirely on his own volition." In a 1978 interview with John Hersey in The New York Times Book Review, Cheever recalled:

I was delighted to be expelled from Thayer. It was not unreasonable on their part. They would have liked very much for me to go to Harvard, and I sensed intuitively that that would have been disastrous. So I was very happy when the headmaster threatened me with expulsion, and I immediately went home and wrote an article for The New Republic entitled 'Expelled'...I was 17 when it was published, and I was very happy about it."

Cheever, in an act of youthful audacity, submitted the work to Malcolm Cowley, editor of the prestigious leftist journal The New Republic. Cowley was so impressed with the story that he waived the magazine's policy of carrying only non-fiction articles, and published "Expelled" in its October 1, 1930, issue.

"Expelled" is the first published work of Cheever's literary career.

== Critical assessment ==
Cheever's academic failure in his junior year served as the genesis for "Expelled", composed when he was 17-years-old. Literary critic Lynne Waldeland observes that "even at the age of sixteen [sic], Cheever showed showed skill at getting beyond the personal vibrations of the experience to a literary presentation of the material." Biographer Scott Donaldson places the author's achievement in a broader context:

The roster of brilliant people who have failed in school is a long one—Churchill comes to mind, and F. Scott Fitzgerald— and every year, hundreds of students are dismissed from American prep schools. But Cheever is probably the only one to use such a rejection as a way of launching his career. He sat down and wrote a story about it, applying a thin veneer of fiction to his own experience...

== Style, theme and structure ==
Literary critic George W. Hunt notes the influence of Ernest Hemingway in the opening paragraph of the work:

It didn't come all at once. It took a long time. First I had a skirmish with the English department and then all the other departments. Pretty soon something had to be done. The first signs were cordialities on the part of the headmaster. He was never nice to anybody unless he was a football star, or hadn't paid his tuition, or was going to be expelled. That's how I knew.

Commenting on the structure of "Expelled", literary critic Robert Morace called it "very nearly cubist in effect.": "The nonlinear structure has sometimes been misread as a sign of literary apprenticeship rather than understood as characteristic of Cheever's approach, both early and late, to the writing of fiction." Praising Cheever's "stylistic restraint" in "Expelled", literary critic Patrick Meanor reports that "the narrative voice is never strident." Meanor cites this passage of the story to illustrate the point:

It was not the fault of the school at all. It was the fault of the system - the non-educational system, the college preparatory system...That is what made the school so useless. As a college preparatory school it was a fine school. In five years they could make raw material look like college material. They could clothe it and breed it and make it say the right things when the colleges ask it to talk. That was its duty. They weren't prepared to educate anybody...

Literary critic James E. O'Hara quotes a passage from the story to illustrate Cheever's contempt and alienation from Thayer Academy and the prep school establishment:

"Few American writers have begun their careers at the age of seventeen with a story like "Expelled", which combines the clumsiness of a first effort with a remarkable maturity of vision...establishing an autobiographical pattern of composition that Cheever adhered to throughout his life."— Literary critic Patrick Meanor in John Cheever Revisited (1995)

Donaldson adds: "In 999 cases out of a thousand, such a submission would have turned into a political harangue and been rejected without a second glance. But Cheever's tale was different...it caught Cowley's attention and held it."

As a college preparatory school it was a fine school. In five years they could make raw material look like college material. They could clothe it and breed it, make it say the right things when the colleges asked it to talk. That was its duty.

Remarking on work's key thematic element, Patrick Meanor regards "Expelled" as "the first example of the single most important thematic element pattern" in Cheever's work, "the fall" from innocence, and adding this seminal story "marked the first of Cheever's outcast or the exile, a character type that surfaces throughout his fiction."

== Sources ==
- Bailey, Blake. 2009. Notes on Text in John Cheever: Collected Stories and Other Writing. The Library of America. Pp. 1025-1028 ISBN 978-1-59853-034-6
- Cheever, John. 1994. The Uncollected Stories of John Cheever. Edited by Franklin H. Dennis. Academy Chicago Publishers, Chicago. ISBN 0-89733-405-1
- Cheever, John. 2009. John Cheever: Collected Stories and Other Writing. The Library of America. ISBN 978-1-59853-034-6
- Coale, Samuel. 1977. John Cheever. Frederick Ungar Publishing Company, New York. ISBN 0-8044-6081-7
- Donaldson, Scott. 1988. John Cheever: A Biography. Random House, New York. ISBN 0-394-54921-X
- Hunt, George W. 1993. Introduction to Thirteen Uncollected Works by John Cheever. Chicago Academy Publishers. ISBN 0-89733-405-1
- Meanor, Patrick. 1995. John Cheever Revisited. Twayne Publishers, New York. ISBN 0-8057-3999-8
- O'Hara, James E. 1989. John Cheever: A Study of the Short Fiction. Twayne Publishers, Boston Massachusetts. Twayne Studies in Short Fiction no 9. ISBN 0-8057-8310-5
- Waldeland, Lynne. 1979. John Cheever. Twayne Publishers, G. K. Hall & Company, Boston, Massachusetts. ISBN 0-8057-7251-0
