= Half Album =

EP by NOFX
- Released: 19 April 2024
- Recorded: 2021-2022
- Studio: Motor (San Francisco)
- Genre: Skate punk
- Length: 14:43
- Label: Fat Wreck Chords
- Producers: Bill Stevenson, Jason Livermore

NOFX chronology
Double Album (2022)	Half Album (2024)	40 Years of Fuckin' Up: Soundtrack + Score (2026)

Half Album is an EP by Californian punk band NOFX.

Half Album is composed of extra tracks from the recordings of the prior two albums, Single Album and Double Album. It was the groups last release before disbanding in 2024.

== Track listing ==
All tracks are written by Fat Mike.

No.	Title	Length
1.	"Fake-a-Wish Foundation"	1:26
2.	"I'm a Rat"	2:10
3.	"The Queen is Dead"	2:55
4.	"The Humblest Man in the World"	2:02
5.	"The Last Drag"	6:10
Total length:		14:47
