= Double Album (NOFX album) =

Studio album by NOFX
- Released: December 2, 2022
- Studios: Motor; Splendor 2
- Genre: Punk rock
- Length: 27:09
- Label: Fat Wreck Chords
- Producers: Fat Mike; Bill Stevenson; Jason Livermore

NOFX chronology
Single Album (2021)	Double Album (2022)	Half Album (2024)

Singles from Double Album
- 1. "Darby Crashing Your Party" Released: September 27, 2022; 2. "Punk Rock Cliché" Released: November 2, 2022

Double Album is the fifteenth and final studio album by the American punk rock band NOFX, released on December 2, 2022. It was their final album before a pre-announced split planned for 2023.

== Background ==
The album's lyrics serve as a humorous and irreverent ode to NOFX's 40-year career and the fact that it would soon end with their 2023 split. The album is mostly made up of songs that had been written for their previous release, Single Album, and reviewers noted a continuation of that album's sound with few surprises. In fact, the band had intended their previous release to be a lengthier "double album" but they were advised to split the songs into two releases.

The track "Punk Rock Cliché" was originally written by NOFX frontman Fat Mike with Matt Skiba for Blink-182 and dates back to 2015. The song was intended for the Blink-182 album California but was ultimately not included.

== Track listing ==
All tracks are written by Fat Mike; "Punk Rock Cliché" written with Matt Skiba.

Double Album track listing
No.	Title	Length
1.	"Darby Crashing Your Party"	2:24
2.	"My Favorite Enemy"	2:34
3.	"Don't Count on Me"	4:19
4.	"Johanna Constant Teen"	1:18
5.	"Punk Rock Cliché"	3:22
6.	"Fuck Day Six"	2:22
7.	"Is It Too Soon If Time is Relative?"	2:18
8.	"Alcopollack"	2:27
9.	"Three Against Me"	2:28
10.	"Gone with the Heroined"	3:32
Total length:		27:09

== Personnel ==
Credits adapted from the album's liner notes.

=== NOFX ===
- Eric Melvin – guitars, vocals
- El Hefe – guitars, vocals
- Smelly – drums
- Fat Mike – vocals, bass, production (all tracks); acoustic guitar (tracks 6, 7)
- Karina Deniké – keyboards, vocals

=== Additional contributors ===
- Bill Stevenson – production, recording
- Jason Livermore – production, recording, mixing, mastering
- John "The Wizard of Ahhh's" Carey – additional vocals (all tracks), additional recording (1, 4–7, 9, 10); guitar recording, vocal recording (3); additional guitars (6)
- Jon Graber – drums recording (1–4, 8), additional recording (1); guitar recording, vocal recording (2, 3, 8)
- Baz the Frenchman – additional guitars (1, 3, 9), additional percussion (1, 3), additional recording (1, 5, 9, 10)
- Raul "Riff" Cuellar – additional recording (1, 4); guitar recording, drums recording (2, 3)
- Roger Rivas – keyboards (4)
- Sascha Lazor – additional recording (4)
- Julianna De Lucia – front and back cover photography
- Jon Weiner – texture photography
- Sergie – art

== Charts ==
Chart performance for Double Album
Chart (2023)	Peak position
German Albums (Offizielle Top 100)	86
US Top Album Sales (Billboard)	24
US Vinyl Albums (Billboard)	6
