= Linoleum (song) =

1994 song by NOFX

Song by NOFX

from the album Punk in Drublic
- Released: July 19, 1994
- Studio: Westbeach Recorders
- Genre: Skate punk
- Length: 2:10
- Label: Epitaph Records
- Songwriter: Fat Mike
- Producers: Fat Mike, Ryan Greene

Audio sample
- The opening to "Linoleum": file; help

"Linoleum" is a 1994 song by California skate punk band NOFX from their album Punk in Drublic.

"Linoleum" became one of NOFX's most popular songs despite not being released as a single and not having a chorus. Fat Mike, front man of NOFX, considers "Linoleum" NOFX's signature song.

"Linoleum" is featured on the 2004 greatest hits album The Greatest Songs Ever Written (By Us).

== Lyrics and meaning ==
According to songwriter Fat Mike, he wrote the song about his friend Mark Curry, who at the time was living a very minimalist punk lifestyle and sleeping on the floor. About the song not having a chorus, Fat Mike said:

I just don't think to write choruses very often very often, because, you know, it stops the story. Singing the same thing over and over is just kind of dumb.

— Fat Mike, Chris Demakes A Podcast, Episode 37

In the lyrics there are some minor inconsistencies regarding to the line "a dog named Bob who pisses on my floor", where Fat Mike claims to have sang "a dog named dog who pisses on my floor" which is what he plays live, but all official lyric booklets use the original line.

When playing the song, Fat Mike accidentally hit the wrong chord in the opening, but decided to keep it in the final version.

According to Fat Mike, the harmonies at the end of the song were completely improvised.

== Reception ==
"Linoleum" is considered by fans to be one of NOFX's best songs, praised for its deviation from usual song structure.

== Live version ==
"Linoleum"

Song by NOFX

from the album I Heard They Suck Live!!
- Released: August 22, 1995
- Recorded: January 8, 1995
- Venue: The Roxy
- Genre: Skate Punk, Live
- Length: 2:15
- Label: Fat Wreck Chords
- Songwriter: Fat Mike
- Producer: Ryan Greene

A live version of the song is included on the live album I Heard They Suck Live!! This version also appears on the soundtrack for the documentary about NOFX, 40 Years of Fuckin' Up.

== Covers ==
The song has been covered by Streetlight Manifesto, Shai Hulud, Bad Astronaut, and Tony Sly, as well as NOFX themselves on their second to last album Single Album with the track "Linewleum" featuring Avenged Sevenfold.

"Linoleum" was the last song Tony Sly played before his death at age 41.

== Personnel ==
- Fat Mike – production, songwriter, bassist
- El Hefe – guitarist
- Eric Melvin – guitarist
- Erik Sandin – percussion
- Ryan Greene – production
