= Fall Creek Township, Indiana =

Fall Creek Township, Indiana is the name of three townships in the U.S. state of Indiana:

- Fall Creek Township, Hamilton County, Indiana
- Fall Creek Township, Henry County, Indiana
- Fall Creek Township, Madison County, Indiana

== See also ==
- Fall Creek Township (disambiguation)
