= Parking Lot (Blink-182 song) =

Promotional single by Blink-182

from the album California (Deluxe)
- Released: March 16, 2017
- Recorded: January 2017
- Studio: Foxy Studios (Woodland Hills, California)
- Genre: Pop punk
- Length: 2:46
- Label: BMG
- Songwriters: Mark Hoppus; Travis Barker; Matt Skiba; John Feldmann
- Producer: John Feldmann

Blink-182 singles chronology
"Home Is Such a Lonely Place" (2017)	"Parking Lot" (2017)	"Blame It on My Youth" (2019)

"Parking Lot" is a song recorded by American rock band Blink-182. The song was released on March 16, 2017 through BMG Rights Management, as a promotional single for the deluxe edition of the band's seventh studio album California. It was written by bassist Mark Hoppus, drummer Travis Barker, guitarist Matt Skiba, and producer John Feldmann. The high-energy pop-punk track features a catchy, anthemic chorus built for singalongs, along with a heavier breakdown section.

The song was written during sessions for the deluxe reissue of California, when the band sought to add more upbeat material. The song centers on nostalgic reflections of suburban adolescence, using parking lots as a symbolic setting for formative life moments such as relationships and friendships. Commercially, "Parking Lot" only charted in the U.S., where it peaked at number 34 on Billboard's Hot Rock Songs chart.

== Background ==
"Parking Lot" was among the last songs the group developed when working on a deluxe reissue for California. Upon listening to the set, the trio decided it was lacking in high-energy, upbeat songs. Bassist Mark Hoppus came up with the idea for the song reminiscing on his youth, and conceptually centered the song around parking lots, viewing them as a quintessentially suburban spot. "Whether it's your first kiss or break-up with a girl, or you hang out with your friends, or even receive a phone call with the best or worst news of your life [...] Some of the most important moments in your life can happen in a parking lot."

== Composition ==
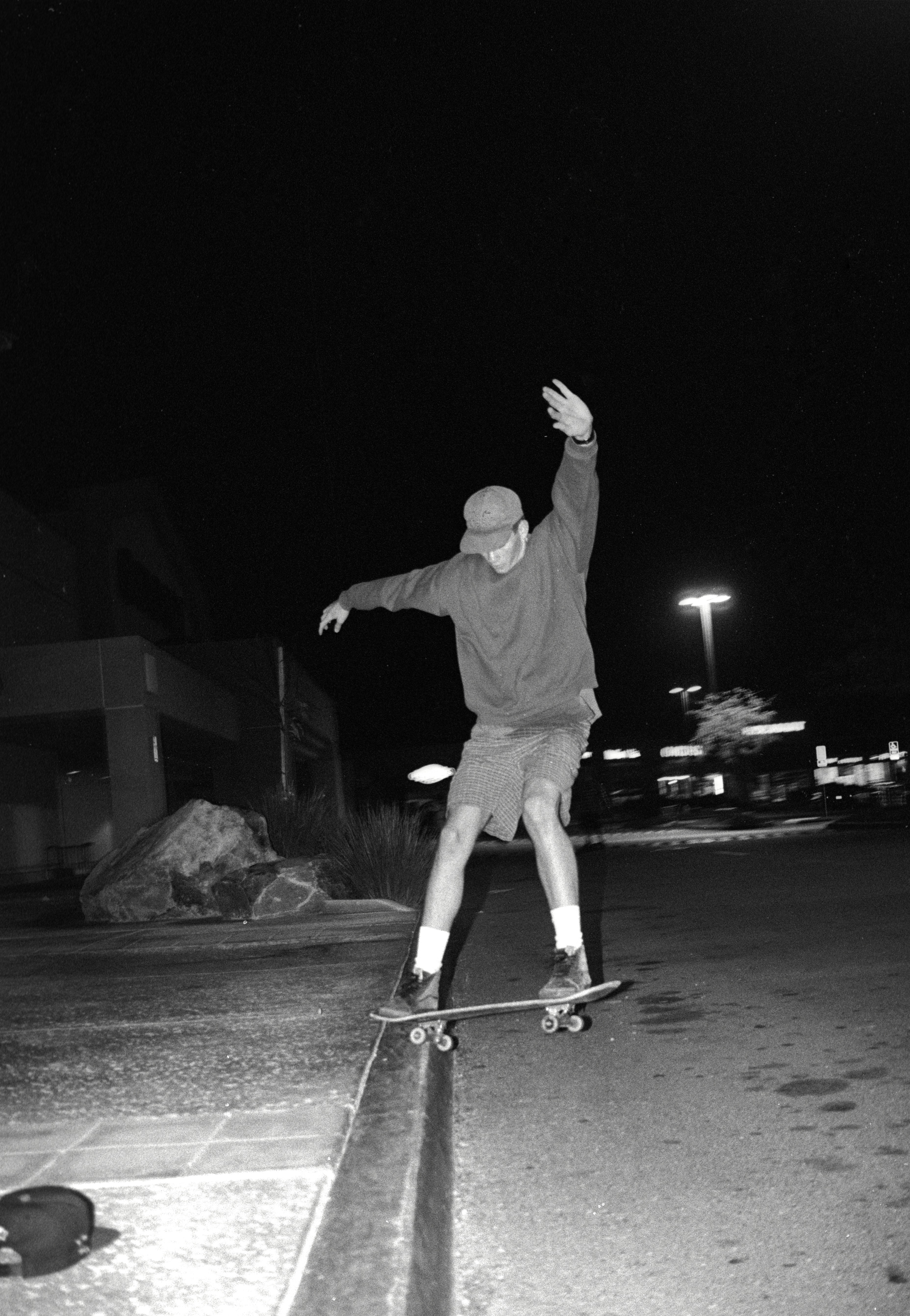
Former guitarist Tom DeLonge performing a slappy in Target parking lot in the early 1990s. Bassist Mark Hoppus specifically references these memories.

Musically, the song is a pop punk anthem using power chords predominantly. Alex Robert Ross from Vice compared its guitar line to the band's work on Enema of the State, their 1999 breakthrough LP. Barker drums in a fast and syncopated pattern, accompanied by "frenetic" drum fills. The track later moves to a "heavy"-sounding breakdown. Its chorus has been described as very catchy; Jon Blistein from Rolling Stone likened it to a "giddy sugar rush."

In the first verse, Skiba recalls drinking on a train to Chicago, spending ten dollars to see the punk group Naked Raygun perform at the Metro, a famed music venue in the city. Skiba refers to it by its former name, the Cabaret Metro. Hoppus begins his verse recounting times spent with friends skateboarding in the parking lot of a Target retail store. He then moves to a narrative of sneaking into a lover's home to spend time together, referencing the groups Violent Femmes and the Smiths as bands they enjoy.

In the chorus, Hoppus and Skiba put themselves in the place of "forgotten young" suburban kids, aimlessly wandering Californian streets. Thematically, this connects to subject matter the trio frequently explored in their early work. At the end of each chorus, the band repeat the hook "na na na". Its hook of "fuck this place, let's put up a parking lot" has been compared to Joni Mitchell's 1970 single "Big Yellow Taxi", which uses a similar lyric in a close key and melody.

== Release and reception ==
Jon Blistein of Rolling Stone commended the "blistering" anthem that celebrates "the most adolescent activity: petty loitering". Alex Robert Ross from Vice praised the song and Skiba's contribution: "The key is that Skiba's voice works better here than it did almost anywhere else on California, crackling a little in the middle range." Brandon Friederich, staff writer for Maxim, called it a "rollicking return to form" for the trio.

== Credits ==
Credits adapted from the album's liner notes.

Locations

- Recorded at Foxy Studios (Los Angeles, California)

Personnel

Blink-182

- Mark Hoppus – vocals, bass guitar
- Travis Barker – drums, percussion
- Matt Skiba – vocals, guitars

Production

- John Feldmann – Record producer
- Zakk Cervini – additional production, recording engineer, mixing engineer
- Matt Pauling – additional production, recording engineer
- Ted Jensen – mastering engineer
- Allie Snow – assistant
- Brian Burnham – assistant
- Cody Okonski – assistant

== Charts ==
Chart (2017)	Peak position
US Hot Rock & Alternative Songs (Billboard)	34
