= Catching a Serial Killer: Bruce McArthur =

2021 Canadian TV film

- Genre: Documentary
- Directed by: James Buddy Day
- Countries of origin: Canada; United States
- Original language: English

Production
- Producers: Diana Foley; Ryan Valentini
- Editor: James Hebbard
- Running time: 86 minutes
- Production company: Peacock Alley Entertainment

Original release
- Network: Oxygen (U.S.); Super Channel (Canada)
- Release: April 11, 2021

Catching a Serial Killer: Bruce McArthur is a 2021 Canadian documentary television film, directed by James Buddy Day.

== Background ==
The film examines the 2010–2017 Toronto serial homicides committed by Bruce McArthur; its premiere coincided with the release of Gloria Epstein's review of the Toronto Police Service's handling of the investigation.

The film premiered on Oxygen in the United States on April 11, 2021, as part of "Serial Killer Week", and had its Canadian premiere April 30 on Super Channel.

The film won the Canadian Screen Award for Best Documentary Program at the 10th Canadian Screen Awards in 2022.
