= Fall River murders =

1979–1980 murders in Massachusetts, USA

The Fall River murders were a series of three homicides that took place in Fall River, Massachusetts, from October 1979 to February 1980 allegedly by a satanic cult. It was the onset of a period in American history known as the Satanic panic.

The first murder, that of 17-year-old Doreen Levesque, was committed on the night of October 13, 1979. Her body was found under the bleachers of Diman Regional Vocational Technical High School in Fall River the following morning. No person was ever convicted of the Levesque murder.

The murder of the next victim, 19-year-old Barbara Raposa, was committed on November 7, 1979, but her body was not discovered until January 26, 1980. Andy Maltais was convicted and sentenced to life in prison without the possibility of parole for the Raposa murder.

The third murder, that of 20-year-old Karen Marsden, is thought to have been committed on February 8, 1980. Portions of her skull were discovered on April 13, 1980. Her body has never been recovered. Multiple individuals were charged in the Marsden murder, but only Carl Drew and Robin Murphy were convicted. Carl Drew was convicted at trial and sentenced to life in prison without the possibility of parole. Robin Murphy pleaded guilty to second degree murder as part of an agreement to testify on behalf of the prosecution, saying Drew orchestrated the killing. Murphy was sentenced to life in prison with the possibility of parole, eventually being released in 2004. She later recanted her confession, claiming she did not take part in the killing and only agreed to testify to ensure the other alleged participants would be jailed. She was returned to prison in 2011 for violating her parole.

The Fall River murders are the subject of the 2021 documentary Fall River produced by Blumhouse and directed by James Buddy Day.

== Doreen Levesque ==
Doreen Ann Levesque was a 17-year-old resident of New Bedford. On the night of her murder, she had traveled to Fall River to engage in prostitution with another sex worker, "Gail." Witnesses reported seeing Levesque being intoxicated downtown at several establishments and engaging in prostitution on Pleasant Street.

At approximately 6:00 a.m. on October 13, 1979, Levesque's body was found under the bleachers of Diman Regional Vocational Technical High School by two joggers, who were using the school's running track. She had been sexually assaulted and bludgeoned to death and was identified only after police released a composite drawing to local newspapers.

== Barbara Raposa ==
Barbara Raposa was a 19-year-old single mother with a history of drug abuse and sex work. She was reported missing on November 7, 1979, by her father after she had failed to pick up her son from a babysitter. She was last seen around 8:15 p.m. by a male friend who had dropped her off in downtown so that she could work as a prostitute.

Raposa's body was found by hunters several months later, on January 26, 1980, in a wooded area on the outskirts of Fall River. Autopsy results indicated that she was killed shortly after she had last been seen.

== Karen Marsden ==
Karen Marsden was a 20-year-old mother and sex worker in the Fall River area who had frequent contacts with police. On the night of her disappearance, police had questioned Marsden as a potential witness to the murder of Doreen Levesque. On February 9, 1980, Marsden refused to identify Levesque's killer, refused an offer of witness protection, and asked police to drop her off at a church in Fall River. Marsden was reported missing the following day by her grandmother.

Marsden's partial remains were found in Westport, Massachusetts on April 13, 1980.
