= Linewleum =

2021 single by NOFX and Avenged Sevenfold

Single by NOFX featuring Avenged Sevenfold

from the album Single Album
- Released: 12 January 2021
- Studio: Motor (San Francisco)
- Genre: Skate punk
- Length: 3:20
- Label: Fat Wreck Chords
- Songwriter: Fat Mike
- Producer: Bill Stevenson

NOFX singles chronology
"Thatcher Fucked the Kids" (2020)	"Linewleum" (2021)	"Fuck Euphemism" (2021)

Avenged Sevenfold singles chronology
"Set Me Free" (2020)	"Linewleum" (2021)	"Nobody" (2023)

"Linewleum" is a single by the Californian skate punk band NOFX featuring Avenged Sevenfold. It has been described as a tribute to NOFX, by NOFX..

"Linewleum" is the only single from Single Album and is a self-aware cover of their most popular song "Linoleum".. The song was released alongside two music videos, consisting of archival footage of bands, such as Superman Is Dead, covering Linoleum.

Avenged Sevenfold accepted the invitation to be featured on "Linewleum" as they grew up with a lot of NOFX's records.
