= Fall Brook =

Fall Brook may refer to:

- Fall Brook (Lackawanna River tributary)
- Fall Brook (Bear Kill tributary)
- Fall Brook (Black River tributary)
- Fall Brook Gorge, a geological feature in New York
- Fall Brook, Pennsylvania, a ghost coal mining town

== See also ==
- Fall Creek (disambiguation)
- Fall River (disambiguation)
