= Falls Creek =

Falls Creek may refer to:

In Australia

- Falls Creek, New South Wales, a small town on the South Coast of New South Wales
- Falls Creek, Victoria, a ski resort in the Victorian Alps
- Falls Creek (Victoria), a watercourse with its headwaters in the Victorian Alps

In Canada

- Falls Creek, British Columbia, Canada: a waterfall and creek in Wells Gray Provincial Park

In the United States

- Falls Creek (California)
- Falls Creek (Deep River tributary), a stream in Moore and Chatham Counties, North Carolina
- Falls Creek, Pennsylvania, a town
- Falls Creek Baptist Conference Center, Oklahoma

== See also ==
- Falls River (disambiguation)
- False Creek
