= She's Out of Her Mind =

Single by Blink-182

from the album California
- Released: October 11, 2016
- Recorded: January–March 2016
- Studio: Foxy Studios (Woodland Hills, California)
- Genre: Pop-punk
- Length: 2:43
- Label: BMG
- Songwriter(s): Mark Hoppus; Travis Barker; Matt Skiba; John Feldmann
- Producer(s): John Feldmann

Blink-182 singles chronology
| "Bored to Death" (2016) | "She's Out of Her Mind" (2016) | "Home Is Such a Lonely Place" (2017) |

"She's Out of Her Mind" is a song recorded by American rock band Blink-182 for the group's seventh studio album, California (2016). The song was released as the second single from California on October 11, 2016 through BMG. Written by bassist Mark Hoppus, drummer Travis Barker, guitarist Matt Skiba, and producer John Feldmann, the song was re-written multiple times to make its chorus as catchy as possible. It contains lyrical references to the bands the Cure and Bauhaus. It was inspired by relationships the group had with "crazy" girls growing up.

The song peaked at number two Billboard's Alternative Songs chart. Critical reviews were mixed; some appreciated its "throwback" nature, while others considered it unoriginal. Its music video stars social media personalities running the streets of Los Angeles in the nude—a remake of the video for the band's 1999 song "What's My Age Again?" To promote the song, the group performed it on Jimmy Kimmel Live!

== Background ==
Producer John Feldmann first came up with the lyrical concept for the song while walking around Disneyland with his children. He created the song's early working title, "Orange County Girl"—as Hoppus's wife, Skye Everly, is from Orange County, California, and Blink are a Southern California-based group. The song came together early in the recording process. According to producer John Feldmann, "We wanted to write a classic, no-brainer pop-punk song: major key, fun, happy, classic." The chorus was the result of multiple rewrites, with each draft attempting to perfect the chorus preceding it. "The end result is the combination of maybe four or five different choruses," Hoppus said. He considered it the song that was worked on the hardest while creating the album California, and a "deceptively simple song." As for its content, it was inspired by girls the band members dated while growing up that Hoppus summarized as "awesome, and a little bit crazy and a little bit dark."

The song was first announced as a single on August 1, 2016 through Mushroom Promotions, the marketing arm of Liberator Music, who handled distribution for California in Australia.

== Composition ==
"She's Out of Her Mind"
The song's chorus, which was re-written numerous times to be as catchy as possible.

Barker's daughter, Alabama Barker, performs piano on the song. "We were still figuring out parts, and Alabama walks over to the piano and says, 'I have an idea,' and she starts playing this idea that ended up becoming the bridge part of the piano; it was very organic," Barker told People. "I was so proud of her." As the rest of the album developed, the song was nearly shelved and left off the album because it seemed overly happy compared to the rest of the songs. In the end, Barker was responsible for keeping it on the album, noting to Feldmann, "Dude, we cannot leave this song off the record. It's too important for the Take Off Your Pants and Jacket-era of Blink."

The song also references the post-punk band Bauhaus in its chorus, and also alludes to the Cure's album The Head on the Door (1985). Skiba developed the Bauhaus lyric, and though the team briefly worried Blink fans would be unfamiliar with the reference, they decided to include it anyway.

== Commercial performance ==
"She's Out of Her Mind" first charted at number 18 on Billboard's Hot Rock Songs chart based on high downloads the week California was released, before its debut as an official single. It was serviced to alternative radio in the US beginning October 11, 2016. That week, it debuted at number 35 on the Billboard Alternative Songs chart. It steadily climbed, peaking at number two during the week of January 28, 2017. It remained at that position for a further three weeks, blocked from reaching the summit by Judah & the Lion's "Take It All Back" and Green Day's "Still Breathing".

== Critical reception ==
Chris Payne of Billboard categorized it as one of the "tightest pop songs" on California, while NME's Charlotte Gunn pinned it as a "gem" that will "never leave your head." Some critics, including Evan Lucy at Alternative Press and AllMusic's Neil Z. Yeung, considered the song to be a rewrite of the band's 2001 single "The Rock Show".

== Music video ==
The song's music video, directed by Nicholas Lam, was first released on October 20, 2016 through Spotify. The clip is designed as a throwback to the band's 1999 video for "What's My Age Again?" It features Vine stars Lele Pons, Hannah Stocking, and Vale Genta recreating the band's streaking around the streets of Los Angeles. In the performance scene in front of a white background, Lele, Hannah, and Vale mimic playing instruments as Hoppus, Skiba and Barker respectively. Comedian Adam DeVine, a Blink-182 fan, makes a cameo appearance as a nurse, a role played by porn star Janine Lindemulder in the original video. After DeVine's appearance, the camera pans out to reveal a Toyota Prius bearing the vanity plate "SOOHM", an acronym of the song's title.

Barker came up with the video concept, as he imagined it would be cool if the band weren't in the video at all, and were instead played by women. One of the group's managers then suggested they use social media stars, and that blossomed into an idea to re-create the "What's My Age Again?" video.

== Live performances ==
Blink-182 performed "She's Out of Her Mind" on Jimmy Kimmel Live! on January 10, 2017, marking the song's debut live televised performance. Following its release, the song was a concert staple during California's supporting tour.

== Personnel ==
- Mark Hoppus – vocals, bass guitar
- Travis Barker – drums
- Matt Skiba – vocals, guitars

== Charts ==
=== Weekly charts ===
| Chart (2016–2017) | Peak position |
|---|---|
| Canada Rock (Billboard) | 2 |
| US Hot Rock & Alternative Songs (Billboard) | 11 |
| US Rock & Alternative Airplay (Billboard) | 4 |

=== Year-end charts ===
| Chart (2016) | Position |
|---|---|
| US Hot Rock Songs (Billboard) | 92 |
| Chart (2017) | Position |
| US Hot Rock Songs (Billboard) | 61 |
| US Rock Airplay (Billboard) | 33 |

== Certifications ==
| Region | Certification | Certified units/sales |
|---|---|---|
| Canada (Music Canada) | Gold | 40,000^{‡} |
^{‡} Sales+streaming figures based on certification alone.

== Release history ==
| Country | Date | Format | Label |
|---|---|---|---|
| United States | October 11, 2016 | Alternative radio | BMG |
