= Fall River (short story) =

- Short story by John Cheever
- Country: United States
- Language: English

Publication
- Published in: The Left: A Quarterly Review of Radical and Experimental Art
- Publication date: Autumn, 1931

"Fall River" is a short story by John Cheever which originally appeared in the political journal The Left in the fall of 1931. The story is included in Thirteen Uncollected Stories by John Cheever (1994) published by Academy Chicago Publishers.

"Fall River" is Cheever's second published work.

== Plot ==
"Fall River" is told from a first-person point of view.

The story describes the effects of a Depression-era closure of a textile factory in an unnamed town in New England. Cargo vessels sit empty in the harbor. Desperation and demoralization grips the local population who are entirely dependent on the mill to provide jobs and fuel the local economy. The narrator shares rent with a companion. Unemployed, their rental payments are three weeks in arrears. With spring approaching, there is no sign that the factory will reopen. The wealthy mill owners in Boston are paralyzed by the financial disaster, and are anxious that labor unrest will become organized.

The story closes when the two men are invited to visit the estate of Paul and his spouse Muni. Paul is a prosperous and self-complacent businessman who relishes his expensive new automobile. Muni tends to her flower garden. Their magnificent farmhouse overlooks the town and harbor where poverty and hunger signal the unfolding social disaster. Muni declares adamantly: "It is spring again."

== Background ==
"Fall River" was written when the then 19-year-old Cheever was under the influence of leftist and anti-Fascist literary figures, among them Henry Wadsworth Longfellow Dana, Hazel Hawthorne Werner and M. R. Warner, all of whom acted briefly as his patrons. Through them Cheever was introduced to E. E. Cummings.

Attending meetings of the John Reed Clubs, Cheever decided to compose a "proletarian-themed" work for the anti-capitalist publication, The Left, which featured anti-capitalist avant-garde literature.

== Critical assessment ==
Literary critic John E. O'Hara reports that the story is of interest in that it "skirts the edges of pro-Communist sentiment" but that as literature is "primarily an experiment in mood creation" in its imagery of a mill town devastated by the Great Depression. Though "devoid of characterizations" the story hints at the potential political radicalization of unemployed mill workers. Biographer Scott Donaldson writes: "Artistically, 'Fall River' was a failure, since it consisted almost entirely of descriptive passages, with little plot or characterization to command interest."

Literary critic George W. Hunt identifies the following paragraph from "Fall River" as an example of Cheever's ability to "assimilate Hemingway's style.":

The house we lived in was on a steep hill, and we could look down into the salt marshes and the high gray river moving into the sea. It was winter but there had been no snow and for a whole season the roads were dusty and the sky was heavy and the trees had dropped their leaves for the winter. But the sky remained heavy and the roads were dusty for as long as three weeks and when the spring came it was hard to remember the snow because there had been so little.

Commenting on "Fall River" and the other works appearing in Thirteen Uncollected Stories by John Cheever, critic Patrick Meanor writes: "The relative merits of these early stories notwithstanding, there is little doubt that Cheever's literary promise expressed itself very early."

== Sources ==
- Cheever, John. 1994. The Uncollected Stories of John Cheever. Edited by Franklin H. Dennis. Academy Chicago Publishers, Chicago. ISBN 0-89733-405-1
- Cheever, John. 2009. John Cheever: Collected Stories and Other Writing. The Library of America. ISBN 978-1-59853-034-6
- Donaldson, Scott. 1988. John Cheever: A Biography. Random House, New York. ISBN 0-394-54921-X
- Meanor, Patrick. 1995. John Cheever Revisited. Twayne Publishers, New York. ISBN 0-8057-3999-8
- O'Hara, James E. 1989. John Cheever: A Study of the Short Fiction. Twayne Publishers, Boston. Twayne Studies in Short Fiction no. 9. ISBN 0-8057-8310-5
- Hunt, George W. 1993. Introduction to Thirteen Uncollected Works by John Cheever. Academy Chicago Publishers. ISBN 0-89733-405-1
