= Thirteen Uncollected Stories by John Cheever =

1994 volume of fiction by John Cheever

- First edition cover
- Author: John Cheever
- Language: English
- Publisher: Academy Chicago Publishers
- Publication date: 1994
- Publication place: United States
- Media type: Print (hardcover)
- Pages: 227
- ISBN: 0-89733-405-1
- Dewey Decimal: 813/.52
- LC Class: PS3505.H6428A6

Thirteen Uncollected Stories by John Cheever is a volume of short fiction by John Cheever published in 1994 by Academy Chicago Publishers. Most of the works in this collection were written between 1931 and 1942 during which Cheever was in his late teens to his late twenties.

== Stories ==
The stories in this collection are presented chronologically by the dates they were first published.

- "Fall River" (The Left, Autumn, 1931)
- "Late Gathering" (Pagany, October-December 1931)
- "Bock Beer and Bermuda Onions" (Hound & Horn, April-June 1931)
- "The Autobiography of a Drummer" (The New Republic, October 23, 1935)
- "In Passing" (The Atlantic Monthly, March 1936)
- "Bayonne" (Parade, Spring 1936)
- "The Princess" (The New Republic, October 28, 1936)
- "The Teaser" (The New Republic, September 8, 1937)
- "His Young Wife" (Collier's, January 1, 1938)
- "Saratoga" (Collier's, October 13, 1938)
- "The Man She Loved" (Collier's, August 24, 1940)
- "The Family Dinner" (Collier's, July 25, 1942)
- "The Opportunity" (Cosmopolitan, December 1949)

== Publication background ==
"The relative merits of these early stories notwithstanding, there is little doubt that Cheever's literary promise expressed itself very early."—Literary critic Patrick Meanor in John Cheever Revisited (1995)

The publication of Thirteen Uncollected Stories by John Cheever had its genesis in a copyright dispute beginning in 1988 between a small publisher, Academy Chicago Publishers, and Cheever's widow, Mary Wintemitz Cheever. Mary Cheever had entered into a contract with Academy for the nominal fee of $1500 to permit publication of a sampling of Cheever's uncollected early short fiction, pending family consultation. When the publisher sought to include all the works not published in The Stories of John Cheever (1978)—a total of 68 stories—a protracted legal struggle ensued. In its final ruling in favor of Mary Cheever in Academy Chicago Publishers v. Cheever,, the Supreme Court of Illinois found that the original claimed contract was invalid and unenforceable.

Academy Chicago collected a total of thirteen stories whose copyrights had lapsed. These are the stories that appear in Thirteen Uncollected Stories by John Cheever.

== Sources ==
- Bailey, Blake. 2009. Notes on Text in John Cheever: Collected Stories and Other Writing. The Library of America. Pp.1025-1028 ISBN 978-1-59853-034-6
- Cheever, John. 1994. The Uncollected Stories of John Cheever. Edited by Franklin H. Dennis. Academy Chicago Publishers, Chicago. ISBN 0-89733-405-1
- Cheever, John. 2009. John Cheever: Collected Stories and Other Writing. The Library of America. ISBN 978-1-59853-034-6
- Hunt, George W. 1993. Introduction to Thirteen Uncollected Works by John Cheever. Chicago Academy Publishers. ISBN 0-89733-405-1
- Meanor, Patrick. 1995. John Cheever Revisited. Twayne Publishers, New York. ISBN 0-8057-3999-8
- O'Hara, James E. 1989. John Cheever: A Study of the Short Fiction. Twayne Publishers, Boston. Twayne Studies in Short Fiction no. 9. ISBN 0-8057-8310-5
