= Bored to Death (song) =

2016 single by Blink-182

Single by Blink-182

from the album California
- Released: April 27, 2016
- Recorded: January–March 2016
- Studio: Foxy Studios (Woodland Hills, California)
- Genre: Pop-punk
- Length: 3:55
- Label: BMG
- Songwriters: Mark Hoppus; Travis Barker; Matt Skiba; John Feldmann
- Producer: John Feldmann

Blink-182 singles chronology
"After Midnight" (2011)	"Bored to Death" (2016)	"She's Out of Her Mind" (2016)

"Bored to Death" is a song recorded by American rock band Blink-182 for the group's seventh studio album, California (2016). The song was released as the lead single from California on April 27, 2016 through BMG. "Bored To Death" was written by the band's bassist and vocalist Mark Hoppus, drummer Travis Barker, guitarist and vocalist Matt Skiba, and producer John Feldmann. It is Skiba's first single with the band, and the first single to not feature original guitarist and vocalist Tom DeLonge. The song was among the first written for California, and was begun on the first day writing with Feldmann.

The song topped Billboard's Alternative Songs chart, becoming the band's first number one in 12 years. It received positive reviews from music critics, who compared it to the band's older sound. The song's music video, directed by Rob Soucy, finds a disenchanted teenager daydreaming about a girl while stuck in class at his high school. In promotion of the song, the group performed it on both Good Morning America and The Late Show with Stephen Colbert. Electronic musician Steve Aoki produced a remix of the song, which was released in August 2016.

Since its release, the song has been a concert staple and has been played on every subsequent tour even after DeLonge returned to the band in 2022.

== Background ==
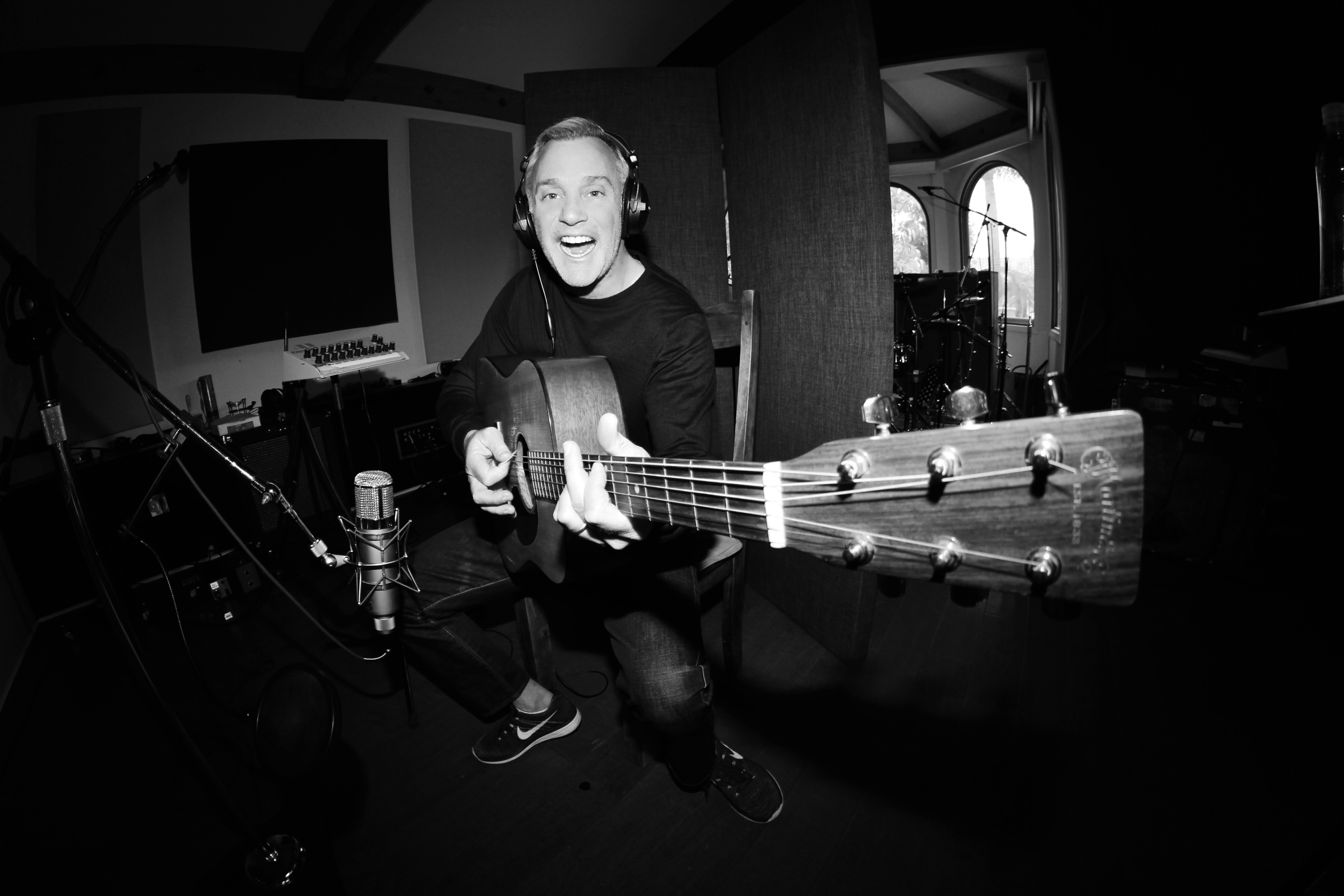
John Feldmann wrote the first draft of the song's chorus.

"Bored To Death" originated in the band's first recording session with John Feldmann in January 2016; the band also recorded nearly three other songs on that first day. The chorus was written by Skiba as a response to Hoppus's verse of "us traversing a relationship and kind of navigating through when things get real murky." Skiba elaborated on its meaning an interview: "It's easier to say you're bored, or to be angry, than it is to be sad. To me, that's what that verse and that song represents." Feldmann wrote the first draft of the chorus and presented it to Hoppus, who re-wrote portions and created the line "life is too short to last long." Feldmann noted that although he knew Hoppus, he felt as though he were auditioning for the job as producer. "My idea for the song was very much, "let's throw everything and the kitchen sink at it," Feldmann said. "Let's do everything I can think of that reminds me of classic Blink: the guitar riffs, the kind of hip-hop/drum and bass songs, the half-time choruses like in "Stay Together for the Kids"."

Skiba heard the song and wrote the second verse, singing the vocal take in one pass. Barker's drumming on the verses was inspired by drum and bass music. "John would be like, 'Trav, do some of that weird shit you play with EDM or rap artists.' And I'd be like, 'OK,'" he said on the recording process. At one point, Barker told Feldmann, "Why don't you give me one minute of click and let me just play whatever the fuck I want?" His improvisational section became the song's conclusion.

== Composition ==
"Bored to Death"
The end of the song's bridge and final chorus.

The song's choruses contain the lyrics "Save your breath / I'm nearly bored to death / And fading fast / Life is too short to last long" over Barker's half-time drums. Hoppus and Skiba alternate on lead vocals between verses. The bridge of the song has Hoppus singing of a protagonist, encouraged by friends to approach a girl at a dive bar. The section features strings swelling to a crescendo. As the final chorus begins, Hoppus's vocals are isolated on the first half of the refrain.

Paul Brown of Wall of Sound described the song as a "catchy" pop-punk song.

== Release ==
The song was scheduled to debut on April 28, 2016 during Kevin and Bean on Los Angeles radio station KROQ, but was moved ahead by one day when the song leaked. Its lyric video was published to YouTube too early by the band's head of marketing. "I found out about it because we had just finished rehearsal and I literally picked up my phone to check my messages there were all these alerts saying 'I love the new Blink song,'" Hoppus said. Disc jockey Stryker premiered the song with Hoppus, Barker, and Skiba in the studio with him. In promotion of the song and the album, the group performed "Bored to Death" on Good Morning America on July 1, and on The Late Show with Stephen Colbert on July 11, 2016.

== Commercial performance ==
"Bored to Death" was first serviced to alternative radio on May 3, 2016. The song was picked up by 57 Mediabase-monitored alternative stations in the US and Canada in its debut week, more than tripling its competition. It debuted at number 18 on Billboard's Alternative Songs chart and later at number 85 on Billboard Hot 100 on the chart dating July 23, 2016. Its debut was the group's highest-ever on the former chart, and to that point in 2016. Over the ensuing weeks, the song rose in positions, holding at number two for three weeks. For the week ending July 9, 2016, the song reached the top of the chart, marking the band's third number-one. It became the group's first chart-topper since "I Miss You" in 2004, marking the second-longest span in between number ones in the chart's history, behind only Jane's Addiction. "Bored to Death" also peaked at number six on the magazine's Mainstream Rock Songs chart, making it the band's first top 10 to ever reach that chart, which is based solely on radio airplay.

== Critical reception ==
"Bored to Death" received positive reviews from contemporary music critics. Gil Kaufman at Billboard deemed it "a classic tale of teenage yearning, confusion and clumsy flirting." The Houston Chronicle's Mike Damante felt the song was "undeniably Blink," calling it a "catchy summer single that equally showcases the band’s maturity while still tugging at your nostalgia strings." Michelle Geslani of Consequence of Sound wrote that "this comeback single proves they haven’t lost their touch for big, albeit harmless, pop punk hooks." MTV columnist Loren DiBlasi felt it "proves Blink-182's resilience, and undeniable place within the world of pop-punk." Stereogum's Tom Breihan complimented its "grand, surging, arena-style," noting its "massed guitars and vast and heartfelt chorus." August Brown, reporting for the Los Angeles Times, considered the track "a pretty spot-on update of the band's sound, pairing teenage nostalgia and tense drumming with a KROQ-ready chorus."

Jessica Goodman, writing for Entertainment Weekly, gave the song an A−, commenting that "the tune is reminiscent of some of their most beloved tracks," and Sarah Grant at Rolling Stone opined that the song felt like a sequel to the band's 2001 single "The Rock Show". Jake Bender of #Tealcheese wrote that the song "feels like it's trying way too hard to call back to blink fans from the peak of their popularity (Enema of the State), while combining that sound with the more modern and alternative rock aesthetic of their self-titled album and Neighborhoods."

== Personnel ==
- Mark Hoppus – bass guitar, vocals
- Travis Barker – drums
- Matt Skiba – guitar, vocals

== Music video ==
The song's official music video debuted on June 20, 2016. In the clip, directed by Rob Soucy, a disenchanted teenager daydreams about his girlfriend of his dreams while stuck in class at his high school. The two sneak into pools, have fun on the beach, cause havoc in a record shop, and go to a punk rock concert. The video is intertwined with performance footage of Blink-182 performing. This video was also the last one to be uploaded to Blink-182's VEVO channel.

== Remix ==
"Bored to Death (Steve Aoki Remix)"

Single by Blink-182 and Steve Aoki
- Released: August 31, 2016
- Length: 3:58
- Label: BMG
- Songwriters: Mark Hoppus; Travis Barker; Matt Skiba; John Feldmann; Steve Aoki
- Producers: John Feldmann; Steve Aoki

Steve Aoki singles chronology
"Be Yourself" (2016)	"Bored to Death (Steve Aoki Remix)" (2016)	"Supernova (Interstellar)" (2016)

Electronic musician Steve Aoki released a remix of "Bored to Death" on August 31, 2016. Aoki professed to being a "huge" Blink-182 fan, dating back to their debut album Cheshire Cat. He had long wanted to work with the group, and became friends with Barker in 2010, which led to the opportunity. He worked with the band at Feldmann's studio not long after the song was recorded to exchange ideas before producing the remix on his own. In creating his remix, he desired to "make a fun, crazed out drop that would make kids go wild to this song at my shows. It's definitely the peak moment for me in my sets when I want the energy level at 11. I play this remix in every DJ set around the world, and I always stop the music to let the crowd know that Blink-182 is one of my favorite bands in the world."

The song premiered on Rolling Stone's website on August 30, 2016, and was released digitally for purchase the following day. In addition, the song was released on a limited-edition 12-inch picture disc.

== Track listing ==
- Digital download
1. "Bored to Death" – 3:55
- Promo CD (PROMOBMG1238)
1. "Bored to Death" (radio edit) – 3:33
2. "Bored to Death" – 3:55

=== Steve Aoki remix ===
- Digital download
1. "Bored to Death" (Steve Aoki Remix) – 3:58
- 12" vinyl
1. "Bored to Death" (Steve Aoki Remix) – 3:58

== Charts ==
=== Weekly charts ===
Weekly chart performance for "Bored to Death"
Chart (2016)	Peak position
Australia (ARIA)	50
Belgium (Ultratip Bubbling Under Flanders)	29
Canada Hot 100 (Billboard)	79
Canada Rock (Billboard)	2
Scottish Singles Sales (Official Charts)	53
UK Singles (OCC)	107
UK Singles Downloads (OCC)	69
UK Singles Sales (OCC)	69
UK Rock & Metal (Official Charts)	2
US Billboard Hot 100	85
US Hot Rock & Alternative Songs (Billboard)	6
US Rock & Alternative Airplay (Billboard)	2

=== Year-end charts ===
Year-end chart performance for "Bored to Death"
Chart (2016)	Position
US Hot Rock & Alternative Songs (Billboard)	17
US Rock Airplay (Billboard)	5

== Certifications ==
Certifications for "Bored to Death"
Region	Certification	Certified units/sales
Australia (ARIA)	Gold	35,000^{‡}
Canada (Music Canada)	Platinum	80,000^{‡}
United Kingdom (BPI)	Silver	200,000^{‡}
United States (RIAA)	Gold	500,000^{‡}
^{‡} Sales+streaming figures based on certification alone.

== Radio and release history ==
Country	Date	Format	Label
United States	April 27, 2016	Radio debut	BMG
United States	May 3, 2016	Alternative radio	BMG

== Filming Locations ==
The music video for 'Bored to Death' by Blink-182 features opening scenes filmed in Room 222 of University High School in West Los Angeles, a historic school known for its notable alumni and cultural significance. Additional scenes were shot at the Los Globos nightclub in Silverlake, a neighborhood of Los Angeles often credited as the birthplace of the term 'hipster' due to its vibrant arts and music scene.
