= Chicago Review Press =

U.S. book publisher

- Status: Active
- Founded: 1973; 52 years ago
- Founder: Curt Matthews; Linda Matthews
- Country of origin: United States
- Headquarters location: Chicago, Illinois, U.S.
- Distribution: Independent Publishers Group (US); Gazelle Book Services (UK)
- Publication types: Books
- Imprints: Chicago Review Press, Lawrence Hill Books, Ball Publishers, Council Oak Books, Zephyr Press, Academy Chicago, Parenting Press, Amberjack Publishing
- Official website: chicagoreviewpress.com

Chicago Review Press, or CRP, is a U.S. book publisher and an independent company founded in 1973. Chicago Review Press publishes approximately 60 new titles yearly under eight imprints: Chicago Review Press, Lawrence Hill Books, Academy Chicago, Ball Publishing, Council Oak Books, Zephyr Press, Parenting Press, and Amberjack Publishing. They describe their books as "a little quirky, a little edgy, smart".

== Independent Publishers Group ==
Chicago Review Press, Inc., is the parent company of the Independent Publishers Group (IPG). Established in 1971, IPG was the first organization specifically created to market titles from independent presses to the book trade. Chicago Review Press, Inc., acquired Independent Publishers Group in 1987. It is one of the largest distributors of independent books in the US. All Chicago Review Press titles are distributed internationally and publicized by IPG.

== Imprints ==
- Chicago Review Press publishes general nonfiction on a wide range of subjects including music, film, popular science, history, biography, and travel, as well as an award-winning line of children's activity books.
- Lawrence Hill Books specializes in nonfiction on topics of African-American and Latino interest, progressive politics, civil and human rights, and feminism.
- Academy Chicago publishes memoirs, mysteries, fiction, and nonfiction.
- Ball Publishing specializes in gardening books.
- Council Oak Books focuses on indigenous topics and women's issues.
- Zephyr Press publishes education resources for teachers that help them better understand how kids learn and how they can be more effective in the classroom.
