= Falls River =

Falls River may refer to:

In the United States

- Falls River (Michigan), a tributary of Lake Superior
- Falls River (Connecticut River), in Massachusetts and Vermont, a tributary of the Connecticut River
- Wood River (Pawcatuck River), in Connecticut and Rhode Island, known as Falls River from its source to Stepstone Falls

Elsewhere

- Falls River (New Zealand), a tributary of Tasman Bay

== See also ==
- Fall River (disambiguation)
- Falls Creek (disambiguation)
