= Fall River (TV series) =

- Genre: Documentary
- Directed by: James Buddy Day
- Country of origin: United States
- Original language: English
- No. of episodes: 4

Production
- Executive producers: James Buddy Day; Jill Burkhart; Jason Blum; Jeremy Gold; Mary Lisio; Michael Wright
- Cinematography: Andreas Burgess
- Editors: Wendy Lee Wallace; Craig A. Colton; Randall Boyd; Ulf Buddensieck; Motoshi Wakabayashi
- Production companies: Blumhouse Television; Pyramid Productions; MGM Television

Original release
- Network: Epix
- Release: May 16 – May 30, 2021

Fall River is an American documentary television miniseries directed and produced by James Buddy Day. Jason Blum serves as an executive producer under his Blumhouse Television banner. It follows the Fall River murders in Fall River, Massachusetts by a satanic cult. It consists of 4-episodes and premiered on May 16, 2021, on Epix.

== Plot ==
The series follows the Fall River murders in Fall River, Massachusetts, allegedly by a satanic cult. The leader of the alleged cult, Carl Drew was sentenced to life in prison. Twenty years later, the lead investigator re-investigates the case after inconsistencies begin to haunt him.

== Episodes ==
No.	Title	Directed by	Original release date	U.S. viewers (millions)
1	"My Soul To Keep"	James Buddy Day	May 16, 2021	N/A
2	"Deal With the Devil"	James Buddy Day	May 23, 2021	N/A
3	"Mark of the Beast"	James Buddy Day	May 30, 2021	N/A
4	"Into Hell"	James Buddy Day	May 30, 2021	N/A

== Production ==
In February 2021, it was announced James Buddy Day had directed a 4-part series revolving around the Fall River murders with Jason Blum set to executive producer under his Blumhouse Television banner, with MGM Television set to produce and distribute internationally, while Epix will distribute in the United States.
