= Independent Publishers Group =

Book distributor

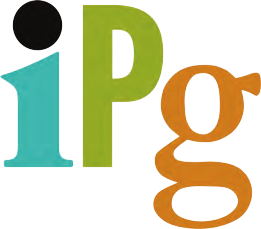
- Status: Active
- Founded: 1971
- Country of origin: United States
- Headquarters location: Chicago, Illinois
- Distribution: Worldwide
- Official website: www.ipgbook.com

Independent Publishers Group (IPG) is a worldwide distributor for independent general, academic, and professional publishers, founded in 1971 to exclusively market titles from independent client publishers to the international book trade. IPG is based in Chicago, Illinois.

As per other book wholesalers and distributors, IPG combines its client publishers’ books into a single list, comparable to the larger publishing houses. IPG’s distribution services to publishers include warehousing, bill collecting, and sales to the book trade. IPG currently represents about 1,000 publishers.

== Merger with Chicago Review Press ==
In 1987, IPG was acquired by Chicago Review Press (CRP) an independent publisher founded at about the same time as IPG.

== Acquisition of other book distributors ==
IPG acquired Paul & Company, an 11-year-old distributor of university presses, in 2001. IPG now sells directly to universities.

In 2006, IPG acquired Trafalgar Square Publishing, founded in 1973, which is the distributor of more than 100 publishers from the UK, Australia, New Zealand, China, and Germany, representing more than 20,000 titles. Its roster includes HarperCollins, Pan Macmillan, and Penguin Random House from the UK and Allen and Unwin and Penguin Random House from Australia; these publishers’ titles are not always issued in US editions.

In 2018, IPG acquired International Specialized Book Services (ISBS), an academic book distributor.

In August 2018, IPG acquired the book distributor, Midpoint Trade Books. Speaking to Publishers Weekly, IPG's CEO, Joe Matthews said that the publishing industry "is consolidating because distribution rewards scale, requires expensive technology, and demands high-level access to customers."

== Bankruptcy in the UK ==
In October 2021 IPG acquired United Independent Distributors (UID), the UK's second largest book distributor which was facing financial and operational challenges. IPG invested millions in UID and its subsidiary companies Marston Book Services, Orca Book Services and Eurospan, but without Joe Matthews providing convincing targets for the acquisition and investment or guaranteeing a reliable service. On July 25, 2024, IPG announced that UID and its subsidiaries Marston, Orca and Eurospan had gone into administration, leaving publisher clients unpaid, struggling to access all their stock and with no communication from IPG.

== Represented publishers ==
- John Blake Publishing Ltd, founded in 1991
- hidden europe publications, founded in 2004.
- Verso, founded as New Left Books in 1970.

== See also ==
- List of book distributors
- Chicago Review Press
