= Fall Creek (Missouri) =

Stream in the American state of Missouri

Fall Creek is a small creek with headwaters in Stone County just south of Missouri Route 76 and northeast of Silver Dollar City. The stream enters Taney County and flows southeast between Route 76 and Missouri Route 265 through west Branson and joins the White River downstream of the Table Rock Lake dam in south Branson. It flows parallel to and then under Missouri Route 165. The White River enters Lake Taneycomo downstream.

In 1998, raw sewage from a broken sewer killed over 4000 fish in the creek. This was said to be "the largest recorded fish kill" in the White River watershed.

== Location ==
Mouth
Confluence with the White River in Lake Taneycomo, Taney County, Missouri: 36°36′39″N 93°16′31″W
Source
Stone County, Missouri: 36°40′38″N 93°19′00″W
