= Robert Morace =

American writer (born 1947)

Robert Morace (born September 22, 1947, in New York City, New York) is an American writer.

He has written several guide books on Scottish writers and has been featured in Scotland, giving talks on the writers he has featured in his books.

Dr Robert Morace Professor of English, B.A., M.S., SUNY College at Cortland; Ph.D., University of South Carolina.

Dr. Morace lectures in American Literature, Contemporary Fiction, and Film at Daemen College, Amherst, New York. He is the author of the books The Dialogic Novels of Malcolm Bradbury and David Lodge (1989) and John Gardner: An Annotated Secondary Bibliography (1984) and co-editor (with Kathryn VanSpanckeren) of John Gardner: Critical Perspectives (1982). He has also published essays in various scholarly journals and in recent collections devoted to John Cheever, Louis Erdrich, postmodernism, and American Puritanism. Morace has also completed an essay on the restaurant-critic-turned-novelist John Lanchester and a book on Scottish writer Irvine Welsh's Trainspotting. A great believer in the necessary relationship between scholarship and teaching, he is also working on a larger study of the whole Irvine Welsh phenomenon. Morace has also taught in Warsaw, Poland, lectured in India, and won the 1996 Amy and Eric Burger Prize for best theater essay, on the Chilean writer Ariel Dorfman's play, Death.
