= Fall Creek, Ithaca =

Fall Creek is a neighborhood in Ithaca, New York, located on the northern side of the city.
