= Home Is Such a Lonely Place =

Single by Blink-182

from the album California
- Released: April 18, 2017
- Recorded: January–March 2016
- Studio: Foxy Studios (Woodland Hills, California)
- Genre: Folk
- Length: 3:21
- Label: BMG
- Songwriters: Mark Hoppus; Travis Barker; Matt Skiba; John Feldmann; David Hodges
- Producer: John Feldmann

Blink-182 singles chronology
"She's Out of Her Mind" (2016)	"Home Is Such a Lonely Place" (2017)	"Blame It on My Youth" (2019)

"Home Is Such a Lonely Place" is a ballad recorded by American rock band Blink-182 for the group's seventh studio album, California (2016). The song was released as the third and final single from California on April 18, 2017, and the band's last to be released through BMG. The song was written by bassist Mark Hoppus, producer John Feldmann, drummer Travis Barker, guitarist Matt Skiba, and songwriter David Hodges. The reflective song tackles letting go of loved ones and the emotional distance that can come with family life. Conceived by Hoppus and Feldmann, the song draws from conversations about parenting and the eventual experience of children growing up and leaving home, with Hoppus writing it about his son.

Musically, the melancholic track is built around a delicate finger-picked guitar line, string accompaniment, and restrained percussion. The song saw modest chart success, peaking within the top 40 on Billboard's Alternative Songs chart. Its grainy music video is made up of 8mm footage depicting the band members in scenes of domestic life and family moments.

== Background ==
Producer John Feldmann recalled that they "needed" a ballad—"whatever that means for Blink"—for California. The concept behind the song, according to bassist Mark Hoppus, is "letting go of people hugely important in your life." He and Feldmann met for coffee one morning before getting into the studio, and the subject of their children came up. They discussed how their lives were built around family, and how difficult it might be for them when their children eventually grow up and leave home. Hoppus wrote the song about his son, Jack, who at the time was 13.

Hoppus was fond of the song's title, calling it his favorite lyric on the album at the time of its release: "I really like that lyric, because when you think about home it's supposed to be safe and comforting and fulfilling, but sometimes it can also be the worst place in the world." He described the song's tone as "kinda in the same mindset" as past Blink singles, such as "I Miss You".

"Home Is Such a Lonely Place" was sent to alternative radio April 18, 2017. Despite the fact that it was released as a single, the song was not performed live by the band on California's supporting tour. However, the band eventually played it on their Kings of the Weekend residency shows in Las Vegas.

== Composition ==
"Home Is Such a Lonely Place"
This sample illustrates the finger-picked guitar line, as well as the drum roll.

"Home Is Such a Lonely Place" was written by Hoppus, Feldmann, drummer Travis Barker, guitarist Matt Skiba, and songwriter David Hodges, best known for his work with rock band Evanescence. Feldmann produced the song, and Zakk Cervini served as recording engineer. The song was mixed by Neal Avron. A ballad, the song is largely based around a finger-picked, arpeggiated guitar line, strings, and a snare drum roll. Hoppus sings the verses, with guitarist Matt Skiba singing the chorus and providing background vocals and harmonies. A main lyric in the song is "I hold on tight / But not enough to hold you back."

The song has been described as a folk song, in the same vein as "Boxing Day" from the band's Dogs Eating Dogs extended play.

== Music video ==
The song's music video was directed by Jason Goldwatch, and released on June 6, 2017. The clip takes the form of home movies, shot on 8mm film, of the trio and their family and friends as they prepare to head out on tour. The description for the video states it was among the most easy music videos to film, as well as most honest and personal.

== Personnel ==
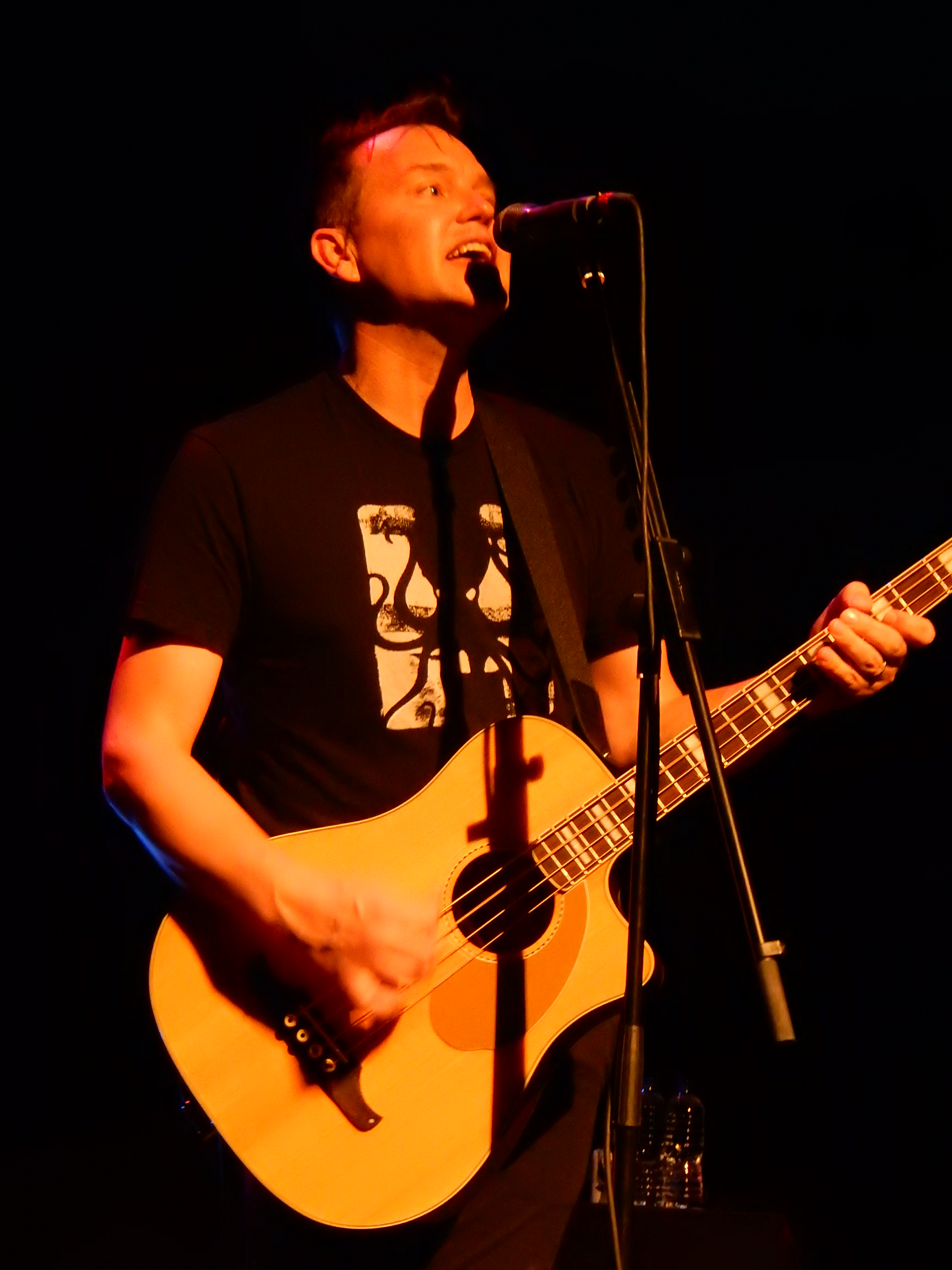
Bassist Mark Hoppus, seen here in 2016, wrote the song about his son.

Credits adapted from the album's liner notes.

Blink-182

- Mark Hoppus – vocals, bass guitar
- Matt Skiba – vocals, guitars
- Travis Barker – drums

Production

- John Feldmann – producer
- Zakk Cervini – additional production, recording engineer, mixing engineer
- Matt Pauling – additional production, recording engineer
- Neal Avron – mixing
- Ted Jensen – mastering engineer
- Allie Snow – assistant
- Brian Burnham – assistant
- Cody Okonski – assistant

== Charts ==
Chart (2016–17)	Peak position
US Hot Rock & Alternative Songs (Billboard)	29
US Alternative Airplay (Billboard)	32

== Release history ==
Country	Date	Format	Label
United States	April 18, 2017	Alternative radio	BMG
