= California (Blink-182 album) =

Studio album by Blink-182
- Released: July 1, 2016
- Recorded: January–March 2016
- Studios: Foxy Studios in Woodland Hills, California
- Genres: Alternative rock; pop-punk; punk rock
- Length: 42:36
- Label: BMG
- Producer: John Feldmann

Blink-182 chronology
Icon (2013)	California (2016)	Nine (2019)

Blink-182 studio chronology
Neighborhoods (2011)	California (2016)	Nine (2019)

Singles from California
- 1. "Bored to Death" Released: April 27, 2016; 2. "She's Out of Her Mind" Released: October 11, 2016; 3. "Home Is Such a Lonely Place" Released: April 18, 2017

California is the seventh studio album by American rock band Blink-182, released on July 1, 2016, through BMG as the band's only album on the label. It is the first of two albums by the band to feature both producer John Feldmann and Alkaline Trio frontman Matt Skiba, with the latter replacing founding member Tom DeLonge during his absence from 2015 to 2022. After touring and releasing Neighborhoods (2011) and Dogs Eating Dogs (2012), it became difficult for the trio to record new material due to DeLonge's various commitments. After disagreements that led to DeLonge's departure, the remaining members of the group—vocalist/bassist Mark Hoppus and drummer Travis Barker–recruited Skiba in his place.

California was recorded at Foxy Studios between January and March 2016 with Feldmann. He was the group's first new lone producer since longtime collaborator Jerry Finn. Prior to his involvement, the trio began writing together in September 2015 and completed dozens of songs. They decided to shelve them upon working with Feldmann to start fresh, and they proceeded to record another 28 songs; in all, the group recorded upwards of 50. The band, as well as Feldmann, would regularly spend 18 hours in the studio a day, aiming to start and complete multiple songs in that timeframe. The album's title comes from the band's home state of California, and its artwork was illustrated by the street artist D*Face.

The album debuted at number one in the US and several other countries, and was the group's first domestic chart-topper in 15 years, and first ever in the UK. It received a Grammy nomination for Best Rock Album; the band's first. Its first two singles, "Bored to Death" and "She's Out of Her Mind", charted well on Billboard's Alternative Songs chart. California received mixed reviews from music critics, with some praising the band's return to their classic sound and others criticizing the length of the album as well as Feldmann's input and production. The band supported the album with a large headlining tour in North America and Europe. A deluxe edition of the album, containing eleven new songs, was released in May 2017.

== Background ==
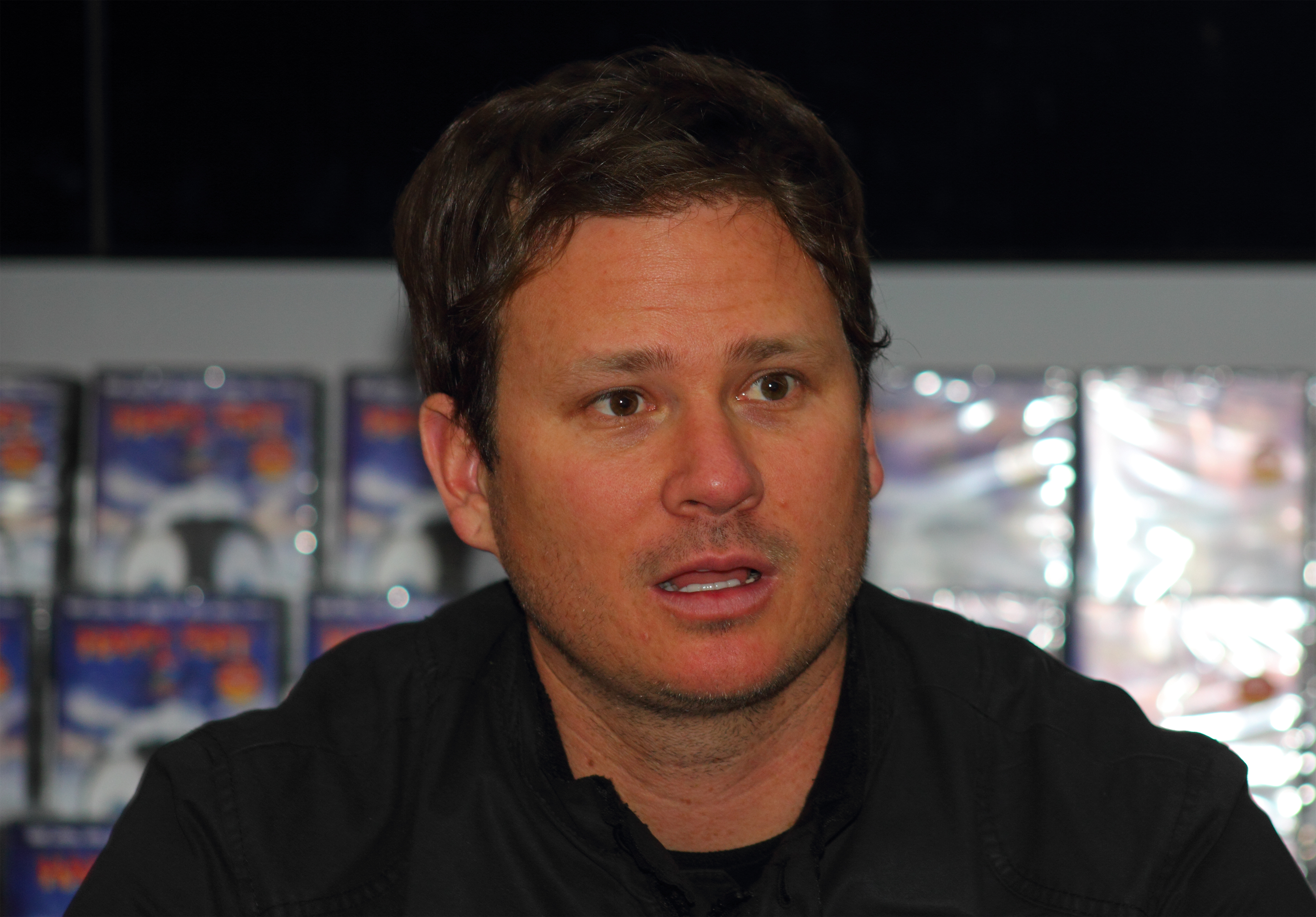
Previous efforts to record a seventh Blink-182 album were repeatedly stalled by then-former guitarist/vocalist Tom DeLonge (pictured here in 2012).

After reforming in early 2009, Blink-182 toured worldwide, and released its sixth studio album, Neighborhoods in 2011. The band members recorded the majority of the album on their own in different studios, an extension of their pre-break-up miscommunication. They parted ways with their record label, Interscope in 2012, later self-releasing an extended play, Dogs Eating Dogs, that holiday season. Plans for a seventh Blink-182 album were delayed numerous times, reportedly due to guitarist Tom DeLonge's involvement in his other group, Angels & Airwaves, as well as other projects. In the interim, the band mounted an anniversary tour for its self-titled fifth album, and headlined the Reading and Leeds festivals. By the time DeLonge spoke to Rock Sound in November 2014, there was still little work completed on the album: "We're just getting to that point of starting ... there's no timeline at the moment." By the time a record deal was finalized one month later, DeLonge backed out of recording and performing commitments by email—which led bassist Mark Hoppus and drummer Travis Barker to seek legal separation from him in what Hoppus described as a "friendly divorce".

Hoppus soon revealed that it was "a very, very difficult struggle" to corral DeLonge into working with the group, while Barker asserted that DeLonge's behavior was motivated by money. He also claimed that he quit the band more than once prior to the group's separation. DeLonge countered these accusations by arguing that he was being forced to drop his other projects, calling their actions "defensive and divisive." As he continued to pursue said projects—including a solo album composed of purported Blink-182 demos, To the Stars... Demos, Odds and Ends—he related to the press that he was "totally willing and interested in playing with those guys again." Meanwhile, Blink-182 performed two club shows and a slot at the Musink Tattoo Convention & Music Festival in March 2015 with Alkaline Trio vocalist/guitarist Matt Skiba filling in for DeLonge. Barker and Hoppus met with Skiba over a lunch to discuss filling in for DeLonge and began rehearsals with the group. After the shows, Skiba returned to Alkaline Trio for a string of dates and also released Kuts, an album from his other band, The Sekrets. After legal battles with DeLonge were worked out, Skiba rejoined Blink-182 as an official member, and the trio began preparations for new music in August 2015. The trio initially began writing together for the first time at Barker's studio, Opra Music in North Hollywood, in September 2015. The group wrote and recorded demos for upwards of 30–40 songs.

== Recording and production ==
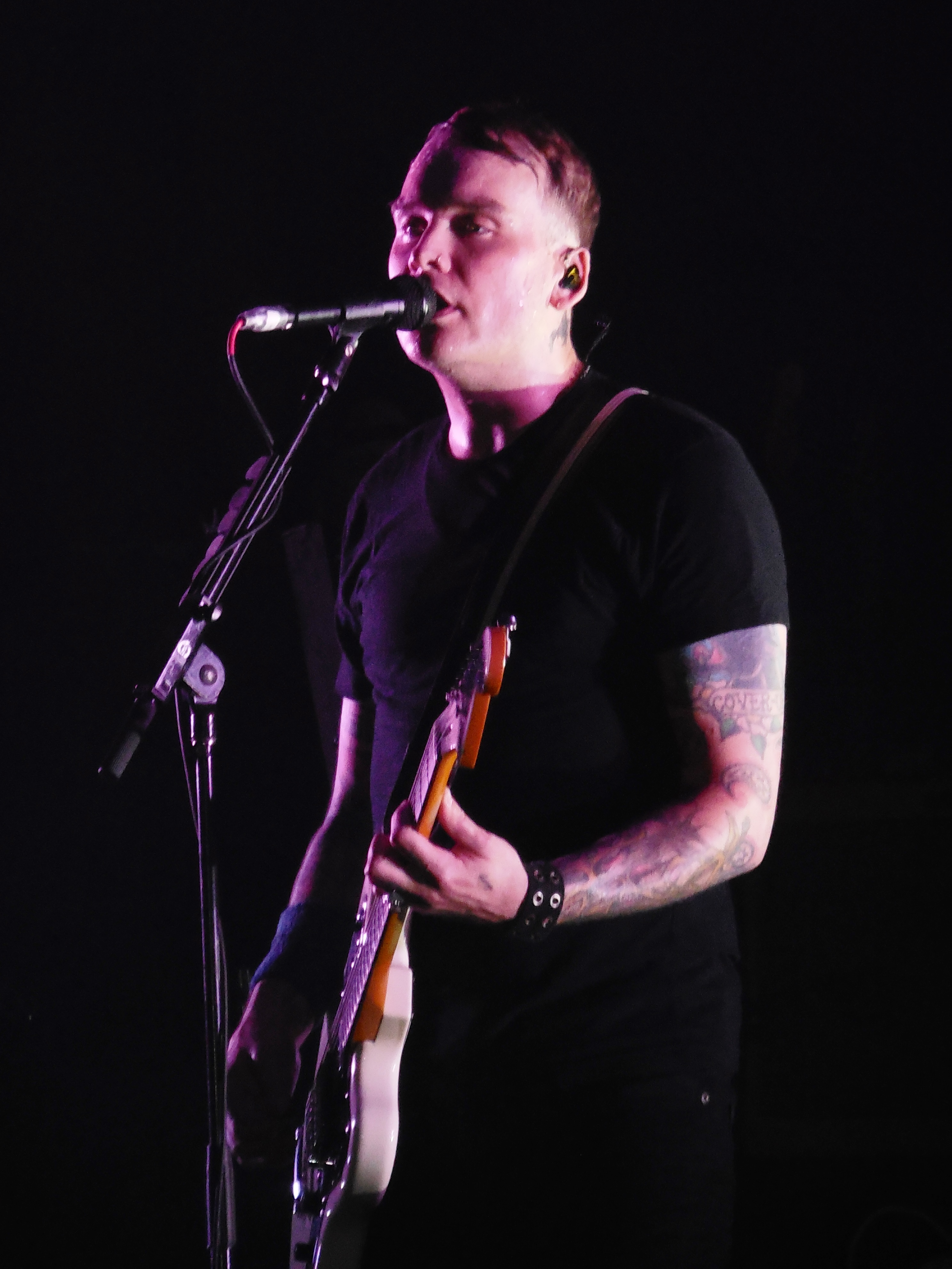
This is the first album to feature Alkaline Trio singer and guitarist Matt Skiba, who became a full-fledged band member while recording California.

California was produced by John Feldmann and recorded at his studio, Foxy Studios, in Woodland Hills, California between January and March 2016. Feldmann, initially the frontman of the band Goldfinger, became better known for his production work with artists such as 5 Seconds of Summer and All Time Low. Barker was the first to reach out to Feldmann about producing, as the two were good friends. He had known the members of Blink-182 for over two decades, as the group had previously performed shows with Goldfinger. He was the first new producer to work with Blink-182 since the death of the band's longtime producer, Jerry Finn, who last worked with the band in 2003. Feldmann "worshipped" Finn and his approach to producing. "I never thought there'd be anybody that could come even close to replacing Jerry, and John is really the closest that we've come to someone who could fill that capacity," said Hoppus.

The group initially invited Feldmann to hear its demos, and he suggested that the band regroup at his studio the next day to make a fresh start. The next day, the group wrote three songs, including the lead single "Bored to Death". As the band continued to write and record, the trio chose to shelve their earlier recordings and proceeded to write 28 songs in a period of 3–4 weeks. Half of these songs were chosen to be put on the finalized album, in addition to two joke songs. Barker fought for all 28 songs to be on the album, as he felt fans had waited long enough for more new music. The trio, as well as Feldmann, regularly stayed in the studio for up to 18 hours a day. The band members would arrive at the studio with no plan for what to work on for the day. They would then write several songs in only a few hours, aiming to complete them by the end of the night. Feldmann asked the members to consider what Blink-182, as a group, are all about, to inspire the songwriting. He would encourage the musicians to write with speed, which Hoppus admitted could be frustrating. "John was like, 'Okay: We've got the song structure. Write lyrics. Go in there and sing it. Go in there and sing it.' Sometimes, I was like, 'I'm not ready to sing!' (and Feldmann would reply) 'No. Go write something great right now!'" Barker was more supportive of this method based on his work with the Transplants, which had a similar speedy approach. "I always feel like your first instinct is your best," Barker remarked.

The California sessions also marked a decisive shift toward a collaborative songwriting model. In trying to recalibrate their sound for a new era, the musicians found itself operating within a creative process far removed from the one that shaped its early records. The larger industry had shifted toward a system built around co-writers, writing camps, and collaborative "blind dates" with strangers. For a band that had long treated songwriting as an entirely internal exchange between its members, the move toward outside collaborators was an uncharacteristic break from precedent. But with the band itself in transition, Hoppus wrote in his memoir that he tried to stay open to the unfamiliar: "I wasn’t sure how I felt about the new process. Who the hell knew blink-182 better than Travis and me? I just kept an open mind and went in ready to mix it up." Alongside Feldmann, the project involved contributions from figures such as Patrick Stump of Fall Out Boy, Martin Johnson of Boys Like Girls, and David Hodges, formerly of Evanescence—a network of aughts-era hitmakers.

"We all wanted to write the best record that we could and everybody was really focused. We'd show up at eight in the morning and stay until two in the morning all week long. And I think that crucible that we lived in for those two months really created something special. It does feel like a new beginning. It feels like when we used to tour and sleep in the van because that's all we wanted to do is play rock music."

— Mark Hoppus

For Hoppus and Barker, working within this broader creative circle required reassessing what elements constituted the band's core identity. The process led them to articulate the fundamentals of the Blink-182 aesthetic—concise melodies, an interplay of humor and earnestness, and wide-screen choruses. Feldmann felt it was a challenge to work with a new version of Blink-182 while both keeping its legacy and moving the group into a new territory. Feldmann's "agenda was to have an album that was palatable for a generation of ADD kids." The band members and Feldmann felt a breakthrough in direction with the song "Cynical", which they immediately chose as the opening song on the album. According to Hoppus, the band recorded a total of nearly 50 songs. By mid-February, the album was "70–80%" complete, according to Barker, and work was reportedly completed in early March 2016. By the end of March, the group were still narrowing down the songs that would be present on the album. The trio posted their progress via their respective social media accounts during the recording, in the form of Snapchat and Instagram clips. All parties seemed satisfied with the record. While recording, Barker told an interviewer that "It's honestly the best material we've written or put out in years. I haven't been excited about a Blink album like this in a long time." Feldmann commented, "I'm just so excited to have people hear it. I'd say it's one of the best records I've ever made in my life."

== Composition ==
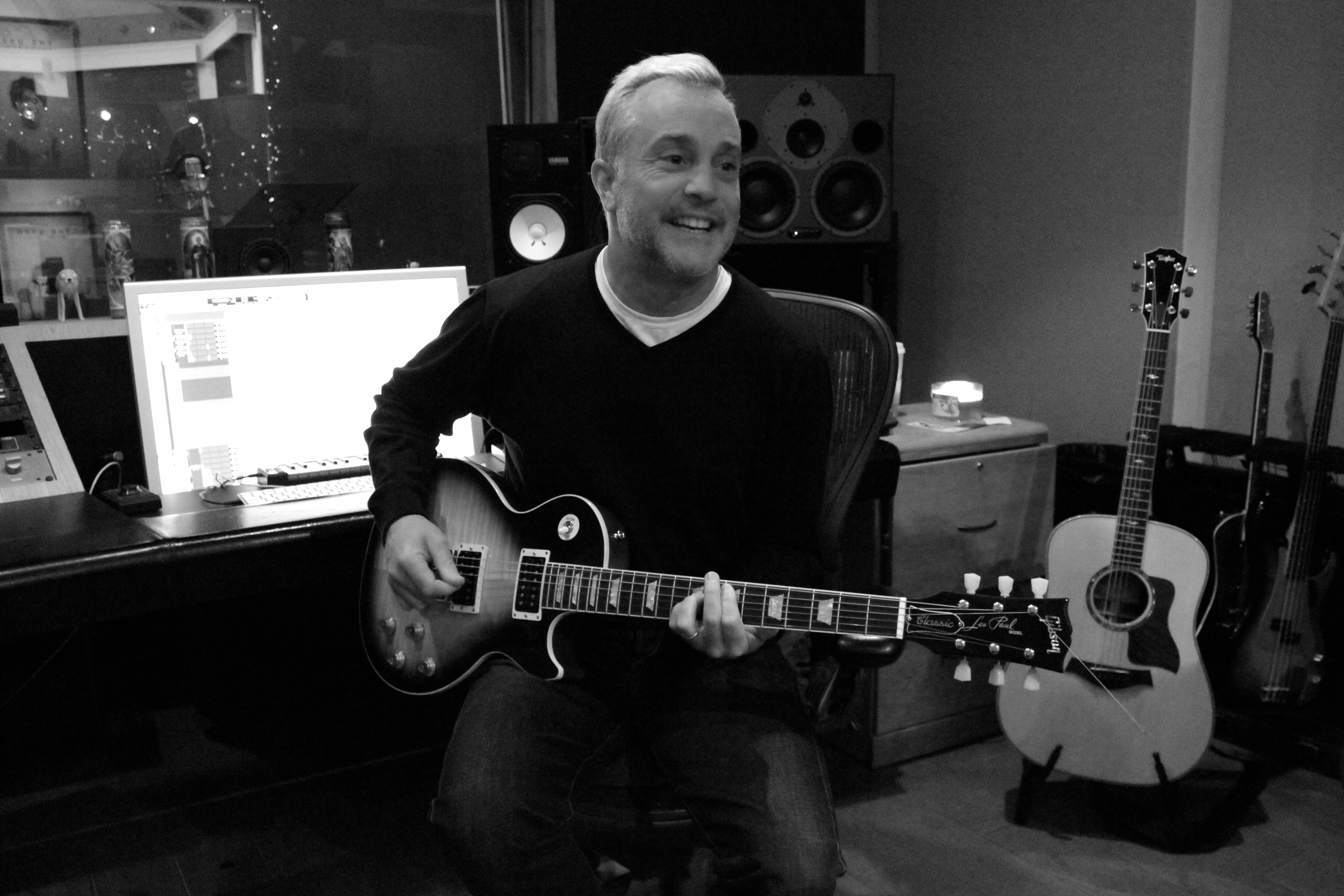
John Feldmann, seen here in 2015, was Blink-182's first new producer in over a decade.

Hoppus considered the music on the album wide-ranging, commenting, "We tried to capture the energy and not worry so much about all the knobs." This includes songs he felt sounded like the group circa 1999, "super-fast late-Nineties-punk-rock-sounding songs," as well as more progressive songs "that are like nothing we have ever done before." Overall, he considered the record "really rich with sing-along melodies and sing-along choruses," which was what he preferred most when listening to bands. Feldmann considered the music not a "huge departure" from the band's usual sound, as hoped to make a "classic Blink record." To familiarize himself, he listened to all of the band's catalogue prior to recording. Lisa Worden, music director at Los Angeles radio station KROQ, compared its sound to the second Blink-182 album, Dude Ranch, and commented, "It sounds like Blink but it's not anything that we've heard before. For fans of the band, they're going to be super happy with it." Critics described the album categorically as alternative rock, pop-punk, and punk rock.

Hoppus considered his lyrical content relatively similar to the group's prior releases: "The topics are universal. There is a lot of angst that could be teen angst or it could be angst of everyday life. I still have the same emotions I had 20 years ago – I get frustrated or I get excited. I still feel like I'm falling in love with my wife." Hoppus considered common topics he wrote about to be "miscommunication, loss of identity and questioning of identity which is a process we went through just by being in the studio, writing a new Blink record and having a new iteration of Blink." Though in the past he preferred to ruminate on his lyrics for days on end, Feldmann's speedy process gave Hoppus little time to process them. Despite this, he felt he wrote "some of the best lyrics I've written in a long time for this record, because I didn't have a chance to go and overthink things." Hoppus's self-doubt on his own creative process is referenced in the opening lyrics of "Cynical". "I start every song with this fear, thinking I'm never going to write another good song," he told Upset. Skiba said that at the time of writing the album, he and Hoppus were both reading books such as Dead Wake, Blood Meridian, and The Revenant, and he felt the prose impacted their lyrics: "there were a lot of rushing rivers and the whole idea of using metaphors to describe loneliness, just like settler, Native American and Southern Gothic influence of literature, that was kind of our rhyming dictionary."

== Songs ==
"Cynical"
Opening track "Cynical" contains a mistake from Barker on his opening drum roll; his frustrated "ah!" was left in the recording.

"San Diego"
"San Diego" centers on the band's former hometown, and acknowledges interpersonal relationships between former band members.

"Cynical" was proposed by Feldmann as a faster song, reminiscent of the band's past work. Hoppus wrote the song about "thinking the world is in a cynical place," but also as a mission statement as a new version of Blink-182. "Bored to Death" was the first song the band recorded with Feldmann on the group's first day of work with him. "She's Out of Her Mind" namedrops the post-punk band Bauhaus in the words. It was the result of multiple rewrites, with each draft attempting to perfect the chorus preceding it. Hoppus called it a "simple love song." "Los Angeles" was meant to show a heavier, more "experimental" version of the band. The song is centered on the band's adopted hometown; its lyrics reference the demolition of the Sixth Street Bridge in LA. Hoppus described "Sober" as "about rebuilding [and] finding yourself, and knowing that you're in a troubled place but striving to get to somewhere better." Its subject matter is based around two experiences: one when Skiba was a bicycle messenger in Chicago and was struck by a car, and another a fictional story of a "drunken night with a girlfriend". Patrick Stump of Fall Out Boy collaborated with the band, his initial idea being "what could Blink be on modern rock radio in 2016?" "Built This Pool" is a short joke song with homoerotic lyrics. The audible "is that really it?" heard at the end of the song was a genuine reaction from Barker.

"No Future" was nearly cut from the record. It was inspired by punk rock history, as many songs—for example, the Sex Pistols' "God Save the Queen"—contain a "no future" lyric. "Home Is Such a Lonely Place" is a ballad with "clean arpeggiated finger-picking guitars with strings underneath it." Its lyrics are themed around lost love; it emerged from an early-morning coffee meeting between Hoppus and Feldmann, who both imagined how lonely their homes would be when their children grow up and move away. "Kings of the Weekend" was also nearly moved off the final track listing, but kept because of its recognizable guitar riff. Feldmann described it as "the party song. We've all had day jobs and we all know what it's like to have that day off to do what we want." "Teenage Satellites" is based around "being a kid and not knowing who you are, not having enough courage to say what you mean." It was the last song recorded for the album, and it was at first written without a hook or melody in mind. "Left Alone" made the album cut because the band liked Skiba's vocal performance. "Rabbit Hole" was one of Hoppus' favorites, and revolves around "standing your ground and not falling for people's nonsense."

"San Diego" is centered on the band's original hometown and on a deeper level, relationships with the group's former bandmate, Tom DeLonge. According to Feldmann, it was a song Hoppus did not want to write. "There's clearly a lot of feelings involved with having a best friend who is not in your band anymore," Feldmann said. For him, the song "acts as a bittersweet homage, a goodbye to this city ... while acknowledging the interpersonal relationships within the band." Stump also collaborated in the writing process for "San Diego". "The Only Thing That Matters" originally began as a cowpunk-infused number until Hoppus re-wrote it. "California" is about "giving credit to how lucky we are to have lived here and grown up" in California. "Brohemian Rhapsody"—its title a pun on Queen's "Bohemian Rhapsody"—is another joke song with the sole lyric "There's something about you I can't quite put my finger in." Hoppus and Feldmann wrote and recorded the song in nine minutes.

== Artwork and title ==
The original rejected and uncropped version of the album artwork

The album's artwork was created by English street artist D*Face. Barker was a fan of his work, having bought many of his pieces at his galleries in the past. According to D*Face, the trio "wanted the artwork to represent California, but with a subversive side to show that it's not always great and there's always something under the surface, in the underbelly." The artist was particularly busy, and employed pre-existing but unfinished illustration for the album cover. He also offered two alternate pieces that were rejected, but later posted on NME's website. Skiba and Barker were pleased, but Hoppus was not as immediately receptive, according to the artist. While he did not admit to being a fan of the group, D*Face was happy with the commission, commenting, "To have a band with such a great legacy and talent like Blink ask to work with you is a great honour and privilege."

The title California is representative of the band's home state, and was picked after the band members realized that they had written multiple songs relating to its cities and culture. The title was also inspired by the season and Feldmann's studio: "It was a perfect California winter, and it was sunny and hot every single day. John's studio, it's basically indoor-outdoor with palm trees everywhere." Though he refrained from dubbing it a concept album, Skiba considered the songs linked thematically: "big and bright and huge and dark and twisted, everything that California is." "The title of this album was one of the most difficult things I've done in my entire life," said Hoppus. Alternate titles for the album included No Future, which was dropped because it seemed too negative, and the joke titles OB-GYN Kenobi, Nude Erection, and No Hard Feelings. D*Face also reported that the titles Los Angeles and Riot were nearly used.

== Release ==
California was announced alongside the lead single, "Bored to Death", on Los Angeles radio station KROQ on April 27, 2016. A music video, directed by Rob Soucy, was released on June 20. The group released an additional three songs—"Built This Pool" on May 5, "Rabbit Hole" on June 8, and "No Future" on June 23—and also performed "Brohemian Rhapsody" in live concerts prior to the album's release. California was released on July 1. The date is typically the 182nd day of the year, but due to it being a leap year, it was the 183rd. "She's Out of Her Mind" was announced as the second official single on August 1, 2016, and sent to radio October 11. "Home Is Such a Lonely Place" was sent to alternative radio as the third official single April 18, 2017.

California was the band's first and only release through independent service BMG Rights Management, and was among BMG's first releases through its distribution deal with the Alternative Distribution Alliance. The album was initially slated to be self-released, but they decided to work with BMG when that label acquired Vagrant Records. Vagrant had a promotional team that, according to Blink's manager Lawrence Varra, understood the culture surrounding the band and genre. The deal allowed the band and its management to be in near-complete control of the release and promotion of California. "We didn't have to listen to a major label spend the money they wanted to spend, [and] we'd just spend it ourselves the way we wanted to," said Varra. Rather than "window" the album – an industry term for its release being exclusively physical for a period of time – the team chose to release California as wide as possible. "We wanted the music to be accessible to the younger kids who listen to it on YouTube and Spotify and different places," he said. In addition, they employed ticketing tiers for the California Tour, making it possible for hardcore fans to obtain the best seats, but also allowing it to be affordable for more casual fans.

In December 2016, the band revealed they were in the process of recording more material for a deluxe edition re-release of the album. "It's a double album at this point and it's more of an extension of what we did in the studio earlier. Some of the songs were songs that we did not put on the first album, but are great songs. And some are brand new that we just wrote last week," Hoppus said to Billboard. On February 28, 2017, Hoppus replied to a message on Twitter in regards of the deluxe edition, stating that it is set to release on May 19, 2017. On March 16, 2017, "Parking Lot" was released as the first song from the deluxe edition.

== Critical reception ==
Professional ratings
Aggregate scores
Source	Rating
Metacritic	63/100
Review scores
Source	Rating
AllMusic	4/5 stars
The A.V. Club	C−
Drowned in Sound	7/10
The Guardian	2/5 stars
NME	3/5
Pitchfork	5.5/10
Rock Sound	9/10
Rolling Stone	3.5/5 stars
Spin	6/10
Exclaim!	6/10

California has received mixed to positive reviews from music critics. At Metacritic, which assigns a normalized rating out of 100 to reviews from mainstream critics, the album has an average score of 63 out of 100, which indicates "generally favorable reviews" based on seventeen reviews. AllMusic's Neil Z. Yeung dubbed the record "their best in 15 years," considering it "a return to form and an admirable maturation of the band's classic pop-punk sound ... It's not a desperate grasp at youth and faded glory, but rather a reflective look back and an expert execution of what they do best." Gav Lloyd from Rock Sound wrote that "Blink-182 have delivered an album that recalls everything that makes this band great and gives it all a fresh twist, the end result is California being amongst the best albums they've ever produced." NME's Charlotte Gunn felt California "has the humour, pace, emotion and huge choruses of a classic Blink record." Evan Lucy at Alternative Press felt it "upbeat, hooky and, above anything else, a total blast." Exclaim!'s Josiah Hughes was more critical, calling it "uneven and disjointed" and "hard to take in as one larger whole".

Jon Dolan of Rolling Stone considered it the band's catchiest music since their heyday, summarizing, "At its best, California shows Blink trying new ways to freshen up yesterday's racket." Jon Caramanica at The New York Times found it "pleasantly familiar if not especially imaginative ... the album [is] full of songs that have achieved their purpose by the halfway mark." Andrew Unterberger of Spin felt DeLonge's presence was missed, describing it as "fine, fun, and overall kinda meh." Aidan Reynolds from Drowned in Sound noted "California sounds like the work of a band filled with the joy of existence, giving in to every pop indulgence or production trick that could stuff in one more hook before the end. There are pick-scrapes and 'whoah-oh' backing vocals EVERYWHERE, and even the dumb, seconds-long throwaway tracks have their own charm."

A number of reviewers found the album overly long, while others felt Feldmann was too much of an influence. Mike Damante at the Houston Chronicle said "Feldmann's style is all over the record, as most tracks sound too formulaic, similar and run together. Other tracks are way too commercial, even for a band the size of blink. ... California is ultimately a step back, rather than a throwback." David Anthony from The A.V. Club gave the album a C−, commenting, "California is the sound of Blink-182 desperately trying to remain relevant by outsourcing its creativity. [It] is another homogenous addition to Feldmann's growing résumé. But this time he unintentionally removed the soul of pop-punk's clown princes in the process." Nina Corcoran from Consequence of Sound was similarly negative: "When not cranking the compression on the vocals, Feldmann ruins other songs with nonstop gimmicks: the piano interludes, the stiffened handclaps, the sappy title track." Gwilym Mumford of the Guardian, focusing on the album's turbulent history regarding the departure of DeLonge, deemed the album "a tired – and tiring – work."

=== Accolades ===
At the 59th Annual Grammy Awards, Blink-182 were nominated for the award for Best Rock Album. California lost to Cage the Elephant's Tell Me I'm Pretty.

== Commercial performance ==
California debuted at number one on the US Billboard 200 on the issue dating July 23, 2016, moving 186,000 equivalent album units; it sold 172,000 copies in its first week, with the remainder of its unit total reflecting the album's streaming activity and track sales. It marked the band's second number one album and first in over 15 years, when Take Off Your Pants and Jacket debuted at number one in 2001. It also knocked Drake's Views from the summit after having spent nine weeks at the top. The album became the band's first to top the charts in the United Kingdom, selling 24,000 copies in its debut week. The album also managed to reach higher chart positions worldwide than its predecessor Neighborhoods and outsold both its first-week and total sales in the US. As of December 2016, California has sold 408,000 units in the United States; making it the ninth best selling rock album of 2016. The album re-entered the Billboard 200 at number 17 in the week of the deluxe edition release.

== Touring ==
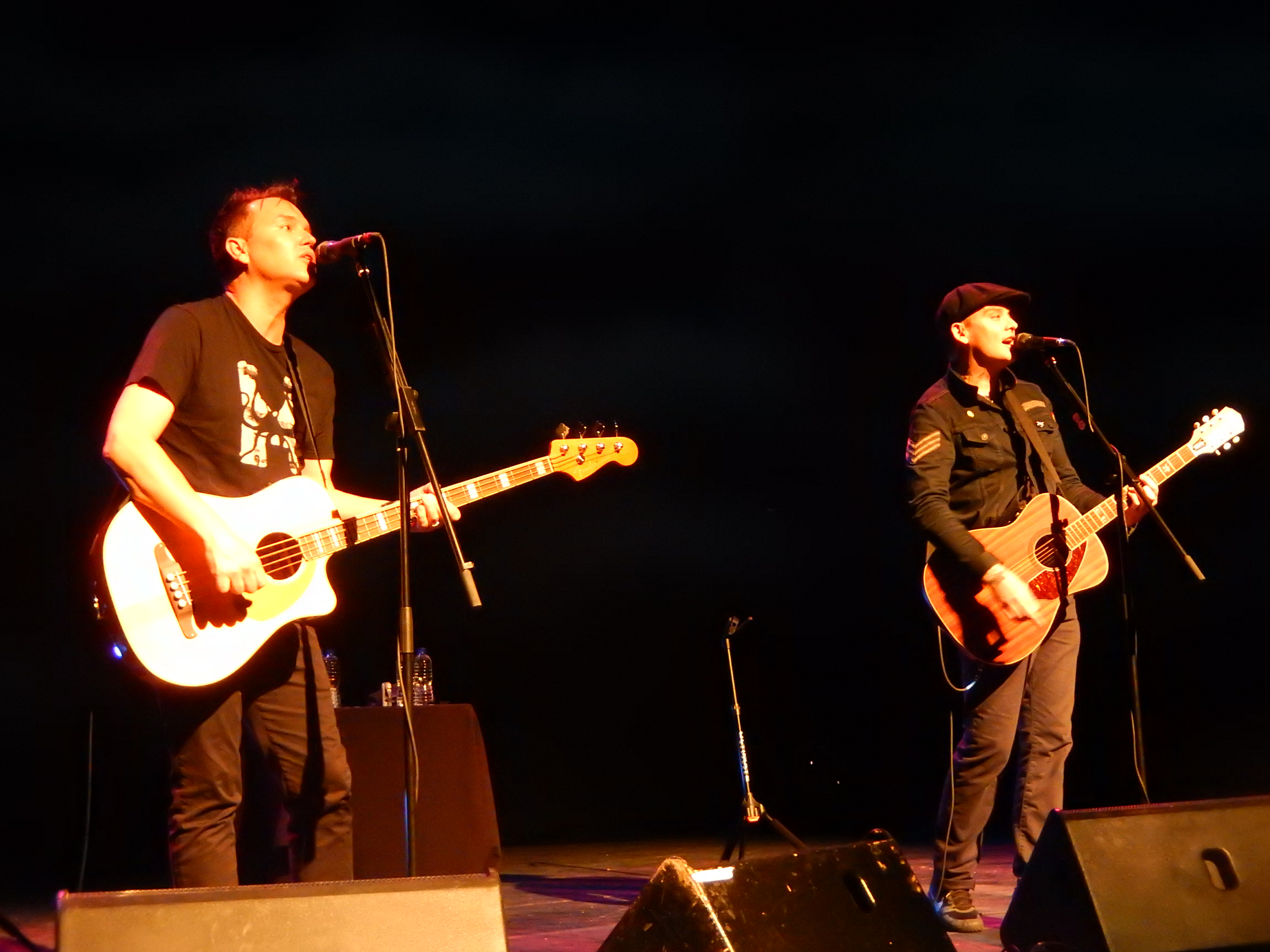
Hoppus and Skiba performing an acoustic set on the We Are Pirates Tour

Following the band's first performances with Skiba in 2015, Barker alluded to a potential tour with rock group A Day to Remember. Performances promoting California began on May 14, 2016, with the group's surprise appearance at KROQ Weenie Roast in Irvine, California. Prior to the main headlining tour, the group embarked on the We Are Pirates Tour, performing at several festivals and amphitheaters between May and July 2016. The festivals included X Games Austin 2016, Firefly Music Festival, Big Field Day, Amnesia Rockfest, and Kerfuffle 2016. Hoppus and Skiba also performed several acoustic sets in England in June 2016. The main tour behind California began on July 21 in San Diego and its North American leg concluded on October 7 in Irvine. The trek was supported by A Day to Remember, as well as the All-American Rejects, All Time Low, and DJ Spider. Afterwards, the group again performed acoustic sets in the U.K., and also performed at various festivals and events, including Not So Silent Night, Holiday Havoc, Wrex the Halls, and KROQ Almost Acoustic Christmas. The band also played the AT&T Developer Summit and the Phoenix Open in early 2017.

A second U.S. leg began in March 2017, with support from the Naked and Famous and Wavves. The band embarked on a European tour between June and July 2017, including spots at the Nova Rock Festival, the I-Days Festival, Hurricane Festival and Southside Festival, Roskilde Festival, and the Download Festival. Frank Turner and the Sleeping Souls and the Front Bottoms opened for the group for much of the tour. The California Tour grossed more than $28.9 million from its first U.S. leg, with a total attendance of 745,395. The tour concluded in late 2017 with spots at Lollapalooza, and the Life is Beautiful festival.

== Legacy ==
California marked a moment for the group, a reintroduction to generations of new fans while establishing their new lineup. Music critic Kelefa Sanneh characterized the album as "a big-budget reboot of a beloved franchise." The three were uncertain regarding fan response to Skiba replacing DeLonge; indeed, Skiba later described stepping into the role as something of an "identity crisis". A hit album for the trio was not guaranteed: "I was speculative leading up, and nervous. This record could have gone either way," said Jon Cohen, EVP of recorded music for BMG. The positive response to California was enveloping to the three: "As long as Blink has been around and with all the drama we [had] a number one album, we [had] the biggest tour of our career and we [had] a Grammy nomination," Hoppus said. For Hoppus, the success brought a satisfying sense of vindication—proof the band could thrive in a new era without DeLonge—and the tour that followed became one of the most joyful of their career, he noted. In addition, the band's ascendance to the top of the charts signaled a larger cultural moment surrounding pop-punk music. During the release cycle for the LP, the band were name-dropped in the song "Closer" from EDM duo the Chainsmokers, which became a huge global hit. "All different kinds of musicians were talking about growing up listening to Blink, and we released California in the midst of all that," Barker remembered.

The band later made one more album with Skiba, Nine (2019), which built on their partnership with Feldmann and used additional outside songwriters. By 2022, after a few years of uncertainty of the band's future with Skiba, they reunited with DeLonge for a new album and world tour, putting an end to Skiba's time in the band. However, the band's success with California remained a vital part of the band's story: DeLonge performed not only "Bored to Death" but album opener "Cynical" on the band's ensuing world tour, and the former has remained a concert staple since.

== Track listing ==
All tracks are written by Mark Hoppus, Travis Barker, Matt Skiba and John Feldmann, except where noted

No.	Title	Writer(s)	Lead Vocals	Length
1.	"Cynical"		Hoppus; Skiba	1:55
2.	"Bored to Death"		Hoppus; Skiba	3:55
3.	"She's Out of Her Mind"		Skiba; Hoppus	2:42
4.	"Los Angeles"		Skiba; Hoppus	3:03
5.	"Sober"	Hoppus; Barker; Skiba; Feldmann; Patrick Stump	Hoppus; Skiba	2:59
6.	"Built This Pool"		Hoppus	0:16
7.	"No Future"		Hoppus; Skiba	3:45
8.	"Home Is Such a Lonely Place"	Hoppus; Barker; Skiba; Feldmann; David Hodges	Hoppus; Skiba	3:21
9.	"Kings of the Weekend"	Hoppus; Barker; Skiba; Feldmann; Hodges	Hoppus; Skiba	2:56
10.	"Teenage Satellites"	Hoppus; Barker; Skiba; Feldmann; Hodges	Skiba; Hoppus	3:11
11.	"Left Alone"		Skiba; Hoppus	3:09
12.	"Rabbit Hole"		Hoppus; Skiba	2:35
13.	"San Diego"	Hoppus; Barker; Skiba; Feldmann; Stump	Skiba; Hoppus	3:12
14.	"The Only Thing That Matters"		Hoppus; Skiba	1:57
15.	"California"	Hoppus; Barker; Skiba; Feldmann; Martin Johnson	Hoppus; Skiba	3:10
16.	"Brohemian Rhapsody"		Hoppus	0:30
Total length:				42:36

Japanese edition bonus track
No.	Title	Lead vocals	Length
17.	"Hey I'm Sorry"	Hoppus; Skiba	3:57
Total length:			46:33

Deluxe edition bonus disc
No.	Title	Writer(s)	Lead Vocals	Length
1.	"Parking Lot"		Skiba; Hoppus	2:46
2.	"Misery"		Hoppus; Skiba	3:51
3.	"Good Old Days"	Hoppus; Barker; Skiba; Feldmann; Nicholas Furlong	Hoppus	3:23
4.	"Don't Mean Anything"		Hoppus; Skiba	2:46
5.	"Hey I'm Sorry"		Hoppus; Skiba	3:56
6.	"Last Train Home"		Skiba; Hoppus	3:21
7.	"Wildfire"		Hoppus; Skiba	3:02
8.	"6/8"		Hoppus; Skiba	3:47
9.	"Long Lost Feeling"		Hoppus; Skiba	3:04
10.	"Bottom of the Ocean"	Hoppus; Barker; Skiba; Feldmann; Simon Wilcox	Hoppus; Skiba	3:27
11.	"Can't Get You More Pregnant"		Hoppus	0:34
12.	"Bored to Death" (live and acoustic)		Hoppus; Skiba	3:55
Total length:				37:52

== Personnel ==
Credits adapted from the album's liner notes.

Blink-182

- Mark Hoppus – vocals, bass guitar
- Travis Barker – drums, percussion, background vocals on “Cynical” and “Built This Pool”
- Matt Skiba – vocals, guitar

Additional musicians

- Alabama Barker – piano on "She's Out of Her Mind"
- Jack Hoppus – additional vocals
- Simon Wilcox – additional vocals on "Bottom of the Ocean", guitars
- DJ Spider – turntables

Design

- D*Face – artwork
- Elyn Kazarian – layout
- Randall Leddy – layout

Production

- John Feldmann – production
- Zakk Cervini – additional production, engineering, mixing (tracks 1, 3, 6, 7, 9, 10, 12, 13, 16)
- Matt Pauling – additional production, engineering
- Allie Snow – engineering assistance
- Brian Burnham – engineering assistance
- Cody Okonski – engineering assistance
- Neal Avron – mixing (tracks 2, 5, 8)
- Dan Lancaster – mixing (tracks 4, 11, 17)
- Ben Grosse – mixing (tracks 14, 15)
- Ted Jensen – mastering

== Charts ==
=== Weekly charts ===
Chart (2016)	Peak position
Australian Albums (ARIA)	2
Austrian Albums (Ö3 Austria)	2
Belgian Albums (Ultratop Flanders)	9
Belgian Albums (Ultratop Wallonia)	25
Canadian Albums (Billboard)	1
Czech Albums (ČNS IFPI)	1
Dutch Albums (Album Top 100)	21
French Albums (SNEP)	29
German Albums (Offizielle Top 100)	3
Irish Albums (IRMA)	5
Italian Albums (FIMI)	4
Japan (Oricon)	38
New Zealand Albums (RMNZ)	4
Norwegian Albums (VG-lista)	18
Scottish Albums (Official Charts)	1
Spanish Albums (Promusicae)	19
Swedish Albums (Sverigetopplistan)	26
Swiss Albums (Schweizer Hitparade)	3
UK Albums (Official Charts)	1
UK Rock & Metal Albums (Official Charts)	1
US Billboard 200	1
US Independent Albums (Billboard)	1
US Top Alternative Albums (Billboard)	1
US Top Rock Albums (Billboard)	1
US Indie Store Album Sales (Billboard)	1

=== Year-end charts ===
Chart (2016)	Position
Australian Albums (ARIA)	49
Belgian Albums (Ultratop Flanders)	155
US Billboard 200	69
US Top Rock Albums (Billboard)	8

Chart (2017)	Position
US Top Rock Albums (Billboard)	74

== Certifications ==
Region	Certification	Certified units/sales
Australia (ARIA)	Gold	35,000^{^}
Canada (Music Canada)	Gold	40,000^{‡}
United Kingdom (BPI)	Gold	100,000^{‡}
United States (RIAA)	Gold	500,000^{‡}
^{^} Shipments figures based on certification alone.^{‡} Sales+streaming figures based on certification alone.

== Release history ==
Sources: Amazon.com and Twitter

Region	Date	Format(s)	Label
United States	July 1, 2016	CD; CS; DL; LP	BMG
