= Falls River (New Zealand) =

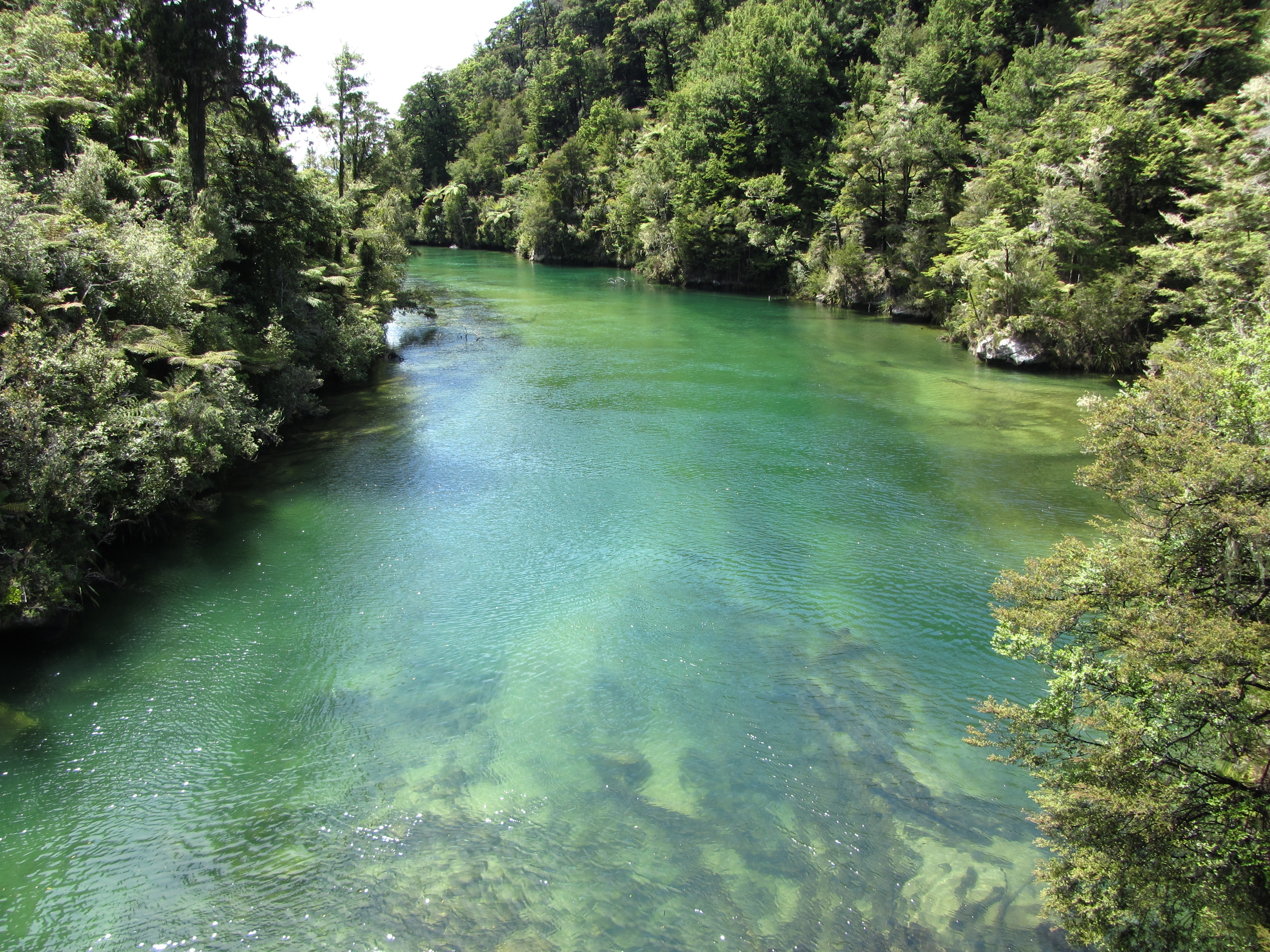
- Falls River near the sea
- Route of the Falls River
- Mouth of the Falls River Falls River (New Zealand) (South Island)

Location
- Country: New Zealand

Physical characteristics
- Source
  - location: Pikikirunga Range
  - coordinates: 40°56′47″S 172°56′38″E
- Mouth
  - location: Sandfly Bay
  - coordinates: 40°55′42″S 173°03′06″E
  - elevation: 0 metres (0 ft)

Basin features
- Progression: Falls River → Sandfly Bay → Tasman Bay → Tasman Sea
- Tributaries
  - right: Buttress Stream
- Waterfalls: Falls River Falls
- Bridges: Falls River Suspension Bridge

The Falls River is a river in the Tasman District of New Zealand. It arises in the Pikikirunga Range near Mount Evans and flows north-east and then east through the Abel Tasman National Park into Tasman Bay / Te Tai-o-Aorere at Sandfly Bay. The river is named because it falls more than 1000 metres in 10 km.

== See also ==
- List of rivers of New Zealand
