= Mark Curry (rock musician) =

American musician

Mark Curry is an American rock musician and singer-songwriter. He is best known for his single "Sorry About the Weather", a number 20 hit on the Billboard Alternative Songs chart in 1992.

He formed his first band, Crystal Sphere, with Larry Beilby "White Boy Larry," Fernando Barrios, Ricky Rutherford and Aaron "El Hefe" Abeyta, who would later join NOFX. The band was formed in the 1980s while Curry attended Sacramento City College. One of Crystal Sphere's earliest followers, "Gumdroplou" (gumdrop Lou), became their first manager, booking gigs at pubs in downtown Davis, California, and even at the Davis airport for skydivers.

In the early 1990s Crystal Sphere moved to Los Angeles, California. Although "Gumdroplou" came with them, and was roommates with El Hefe for some time, they replaced him as manager with Desi Benjamin, who began setting up showcases for the band and got Curry signed after a bidding war to Virgin Records and Virgin Publishing.

In 1992, Curry went solo, separating from Crystal Sphere to sign with record label Virgin Records and Virgin Publishing. In the mid-1990s, he collaborated briefly with noted jazz flutist Rebecca "Becky" Prichard.

Curry wrote the song "Perfect Government" which appears as a cover version on NOFX's 1994 album Punk in Drublic.

== Discography ==
- It's Only Time (1992)
- Let the Wretched Come Home (1994)
- Down in My Alley [with Tenpin Trio] (1997)
- Find a Friend [EP] (1999)
- Dozen Lies [with El Hefe] (2004)
- Front Street (2008)
- "Sorry About the Weather" (cd single 4 tracks) (1992)
