= I Heard They Suck Live!! =

Live album by NOFX
- Released: August 22, 1995
- Recorded: January 8–9, 1995
- Venue: The Roxy (Hollywood)
- Genres: Punk rock, skate punk, ska punk
- Length: 40:40
- Label: Fat Wreck Chords
- Producer: Ryan Greene

NOFX chronology
Punk in Drublic (1994)	I Heard They Suck Live!! (1995)	HOFX (1995)

I Heard They Suck Live!! is a live album by NOFX. It was recorded January 8 and 9, 1995, at the Roxy Theatre in Hollywood. At time of release, the name or exact location of the club was not disclosed for royalty reasons. The location was later revealed on the band's website.

== Track listing ==
1. "(Witty Banter)" – 1:46
2. "Linoleum" – 2:15
3. "You're Bleeding" – 2:36
4. "Moron Brothers" – 3:09
5. "Punk Guy" – 1:09
6. "Bob" – 2:36
7. "Life O'Riley" – 2:39
8. "You Drink, You Drive, You Spill" – 3:31
9. "Nothing but a Nightmare (sorta)" – 1:06
10. "East Bay" – 1:53
11. "Soul Doubt" – 3:00
12. "Kill All the White Man" – 3:43
13. "Beer Bong" – 2:16
14. "Six Pack Girls" – 1:12
15. "Together on the Sand" – 1:07
16. "Nowhere" – 1:37
17. "The Brews" – 2:41
18. "Buggley Eyes" – 1:31
19. "(Crowd Leaves)" – 0:53
- Tracks 1 and 19 are hidden tracks, not listed on the back cover.
- The only song that is not originally from a NOFX album is "Nothing but a Nightmare (sorta)", as "Nothing but a Nightmare" was a song originally by Rudimentary Peni.
- Track 19 "(Crowd Leaves)", sometimes credited as "Outro", features the song "Love Me or Leave Me (Donaldson and Kahn song)" performed by Nina Simone playing over the P.A.

== Personnel ==
- Fat Mike - bass, vocals
- El Hefe - guitar, trumpet, vocals
- Eric Melvin - guitar, vocals
- Erik Sandin - drums
