= Fall Creek Township =

Fall Creek Township may refer to:

== Illinois ==
- Fall Creek Township, Adams County, Illinois

== Indiana ==
- Fall Creek Township, Hamilton County, Indiana
- Fall Creek Township, Henry County, Indiana
- Fall Creek Township, Madison County, Indiana
