= James Buddy Day =

Canadian director, writer and producer

- Occupations: Director, writer, producer

James Buddy Day is a Canadian director, writer, and producer, and the principal of Pyramid Productions. He works in documentary film and television, including true-crime series and specials. Day directed 40 Years of Fuckin' Up, a documentary about the American punk rock band NOFX, and is the creator and host of the investigative series Unmarked: A True Crime Podcast, which explores criminal cases and unsolved mysteries.

== Career ==
Since 2015, Day has been the showrunner for numerous true crime television documentaries and series including The Shocking Truth, and Sex, Lies & Murder for Pyramid Productions. In 2018, Day co-wrote, co-produced and directed, Casey Anthony: Her Friends Speak, in which people involved in the Casey Anthony trial reunited. That same year Day directed Slender Man Stabbing: The Untold Story, which featured the first interviews with many involved in the Slender Man Stabbing in Waukesha, Wisconsin. In 2019, he was the executive producer of Oxygen's The Disappearance of Susan Cox Powell with Texas Crew Productions.

In 2021, Day produced and directed the series Fall River with Blumhouse on Epix. Critic Brian Tellerico wrote "Epix's Fall River reminded me of how well these kind of long-form investigative journalism pieces can be done".

=== Charles Manson ===
James Buddy Day wrote to Charles Manson in 2016 and proposed creating a documentary to explore Manson's longstanding claim of innocence. Manson accepted, and when Manson died on November 19, 2017, Day became the last journalist to interview him through a year long series of phone calls, which were the basis for the film Charles Manson: The Final Words. Narrated by musician and director Rob Zombie, the documentary focuses on the Manson family murders with interviews with so-called "Manson Family" members, Barbara Hoyt, Catherine Gillies, and Bobby Beausoleil.

The documentary presents an "alternate theory" behind the so-called "Manson Family" crimes, proposing the murders were the result of a series of interconnected events surrounding Charles Manson, in contrast to the Los Angeles District Attorney's theory that the murders were the result of Manson's desire to start a race war he called "Helter Skelter."

The film premiered on REELZ Channel and was awarded the 2017 Audience Award at the Red Rock Film Festival, Best Dramatic Documentary at the Atlanta Docufest 2017, as well as and Official Selection of CUFF.Docs 2017 and the Calgary Underground Film Festival. The film was listed as recommended viewing by both the New York Times and the Washington Post. In 2018, Day directed the documentary Charles Manson: The Funeral for MyEntertainment which documented the legal battle over Manson's remains and subsequent funeral held by Manson's grandson Jason Freeman. In 2019, Day directed a third Manson related film called Manson: The Women for the Oxygen Channel. The documentary featured Lynette "Squeaky" Fromme, Sandra "Blue" Good, Diane "Snake" Lake, and Catherine "Gypsy" Share.

Day wrote a book about his experiences speaking with Charles Manson, and the Manson Family, Hippie Cult Leader: The Last Words of Charles Manson. The book described Day's conversations with Manson over the last year of Manson's life, during which time Day uncovered an "alternate theory" for the Manson murders.

== Filmography ==
=== Feature length documentaries ===
- The Salvation of Todd Bentley (2015)
- Goalie: My Life in the Crease (Co-director) (2015)
- Carisa Hendrix: Girl on Fire (2016)
- 40 Years of Fuckin' Up (2026)

=== Television series and specials ===
- Wild Obsession (2012- 2013)
- Seasons of the Wild (2015)
- Expedition Earth (2016)
- The Shocking Truth (2015 - 2017)
- Charles Manson: The Final Words (2018)
- Casey Anthony: Her Friends Speak (2018)
- Sex, Lies & Murder (2018 - 2019)
- Slender Man Stabbing: The Untold Story (2019)
- Charles Manson: The Funeral (2019)
- The Disappearance of Susan Cox Powell (2019)
- Manson: The Women (2019)
- The Disappearance of the Millbrook Twins (2019)
- Catching a Serial Killer: Bruce McArthur (2020)
- Florida Man Murders (2021)
- Fall River (2021)
- The Anarchists (2022)
- Blumhouse's Compendium of Horror (2022)
- Dangerous Breed: Crime. Cons. Cats. (2022)
- True Crime Story: Look Into My Eyes (2023)
- Myth of the Zodiac Killer (2023)
- Psycho: The Lost Tapes of Ed Gein (2023)
- Sin City Gigolo: A Murder in Las Vegas (2025)
- The Secrets We Bury (2025)
