= Single Album =

Studio album by NOFX
- Released: February 26, 2021
- Recorded: 2020
- Studios: Motor, San Francisco, California
- Genre: Punk rock
- Length: 36:19
- Label: Fat Wreck Chords
- Producers: Bill Stevenson; Jason Livermore

NOFX chronology
West Coast vs. Wessex (2020)	Single Album (2021)	Double Album (2022)

Singles from Single Album
- 1. "Linewleum" Released: January 12, 2021

Single Album is the fourteenth studio album by the American punk rock band NOFX, released on February 26, 2021. It is the band's first studio album in nearly five years, since 2016’s First Ditch Effort, marking the longest gap between two NOFX studio albums; between 2016 and 2021, however, the band did release a series of one-off singles and a split album West Coast vs. Wessex (2020), which saw NOFX cover five Frank Turner songs. The album was originally going to be released as a double album, but the COVID-19 pandemic prompted the band to release just a single album, hence the title. Fat Mike has further elaborated that the intended second disc of the album did not receive positive feedback and thus it was scrapped.

== Overview ==
"Fish in a Gun Barrel" was initially released digitally in 2019, whereas "I Love You More Than I Hate Me" and "Doors and Fours"—along with other songs that did not make the album—were released sporadically throughout 2020 as a reaction to COVID-19-related lockdowns in California.

Three music videos have been released for the album. The video for "I Love You More Than I Hate Me" takes place at a house party where all four band members commit suicide in various ways only to be ignored by the rest of the party. The video features The Bombpops standing in for NOFX and playing the song. The video for "Doors and Fours" consists mostly of archive footage of the early 1980s L.A. hardcore scene that NOFX originated from. The music video Linewleum - a sarcastic reinterpretation of "Linoleum" from Punk in Drublic—features Avenged Sevenfold playing the song, as well as footage of numerous local bands covering "Linoleum". A second video released shortly after consists solely of footage of more bands covering the song.

== Critical reception ==
Kerrang!'s David McLaughlin scored the release 4/5, stating: "If your mind was made up about NOFX years ago, Single Album is unlikely to change it, but even if this isn't essential for everyone, it is for the band's troubled leader". Carys Hurcom of Wall of Sound gave the album an 8/10, writing: "Anyone who refuses to listen to NOFX beyond the late 1990's, will be disappointed—some fans will take a while to adapt to the musical variety while others will appreciate the diversity."

== Track listing ==
No.	Title	Length
1.	"The Big Drag"	5:48
2.	"I Love You More Than I Hate Me"	2:36
3.	"Fuck Euphemism"	2:14
4.	"Fish in a Gun Barrel"	3:35
5.	"Birmingham"	3:34
6.	"Linewleum" (feat. Avenged Sevenfold)	3:19
7.	"My Bro Cancervive Cancer"	2:28
8.	"Grieve Soto"	3:57
9.	"Doors and Fours"	4:49
10.	"Your Last Resort"	3:59
Total length:		36:19

== Personnel ==
NOFX

- Fat Mike – lead vocals, bass
- Eric Melvin – guitar, background vocals
- El Hefe – guitar, background vocals
- Smelly – drums

Additional personnel

- Jason Livermore – production, mastering, mixing, engineering
- Bill Stevenson – production, engineering
- John E Carey Jr. – engineering, guitar & slide guitar, harmony production & producer of "Your Last Resort"
- Chris Beeble – engineering
- Sergie Loobkoof – artwork
- Jon Weiner – photography

== Charts ==
Chart performance for Single Album
Chart (2021)	Peak position
Australian Albums (ARIA)	25
German Albums (Offizielle Top 100)	19
Swiss Albums (Schweizer Hitparade)	34
US Billboard 200	152
US Independent Albums (Billboard)	26
US Top Alternative Albums (Billboard)	13
US Top Rock Albums (Billboard)	29
