= Academy Chicago Publishers =

American publishing company

- Status: Active
- Founded: 1975
- Founder: Anita Miller; Jordan Miller
- Country of origin: United States
- Headquarters location: Chicago, Illinois
- Distribution: Worldwide
- Nonfiction topics: Popular natural and social sciences
- Fiction genres: Many
- Imprints: None
- Owner: Chicago Review Press
- Official website: www.academychicago.com

Academy Chicago Publishers is a trade book publisher founded in Chicago, Illinois, United States, in 1975 by Anita Miller and Jordan Miller who continue to select what is published. It was purchased by Chicago Review Press in 2014.

In 1980, The New York Times Book Review described the press's catalog as focusing on children's books, feminist works, and reprints of out-of-print literary works.
