= Enema of the State =

1999 studio album by Blink-182

Studio album by Blink-182
- Released: June 1, 1999
- Recorded: January–March 1999 (Note: While one source states the group planned to begin work in October 1998, a CD promo, distributed to radio stations, includes a press kit and an info sheet that reads "Enema of the State was recorded from January to March 1999 in the band's hometown of San Diego at Signature Sound.")
- Studios: Signature Sound, Studio West; (San Diego, California); Mad Hatter, the Bomb Factory; (Los Angeles, California); Conway Recording; (Hollywood, California); Big Fish; (Encinitas, California)
- Genres: Pop-punk; skate punk
- Length: 35:17
- Label: MCA
- Producer: Jerry Finn

Blink-182 chronology
Dude Ranch (1997)	Enema of the State (1999)	The Mark, Tom, and Travis Show (The Enema Strikes Back!) (2000)

Blink-182 studio chronology
Dude Ranch (1997)	Enema of the State (1999)	Take Off Your Pants and Jacket (2001)

Singles from Enema of the State
- 1. "What's My Age Again?" Released: April 13, 1999; 2. "All the Small Things" Released: September 28, 1999; 3. "Adam's Song" Released: March 14, 2000

Enema of the State is the third studio album by the American rock band Blink-182, released on June 1, 1999, by MCA Records. The band formed in Southern California, earning an early fanbase with their fast tempos, catchy hooks, and trademark irreverence. The band gained greater visibility after releasing their second album, Dude Ranch (1997), which featured the modern rock hit "Dammit". For its follow-up, the band recruited veteran producer Jerry Finn, who became a key creative partner and an important figure in defining their sound. It also marked their first recording with drummer Travis Barker, whose speed, precision, and versatility helped elevate their musicianship.

Recorded across their hometown of San Diego and Los Angeles over three months, Enema of the State introduced a cleaner, more melodic approach that contrasted with the band's rawer early work. Finn's glossy production emphasized tight arrangements, bright harmonies, and a polished pop sensibility that would become emblematic of mainstream pop-punk. Guitarist Tom DeLonge and bassist Mark Hoppus primarily culled stories from friends and autobiographical situations to craft summer-related tracks revolving around teenage breakups, suburban parties and maturity, as well as more offbeat subject matter such as UFO conspiracy theories. The cover art famously features adult film actress Janine Lindemulder in a nurse uniform; the title is a pun on the term enemy of the state.

Upon release, Enema of the State was a huge commercial hit, though some critics viewed the band's radio-friendly sound and goofy image as a departure from their grassroots, less polished sound. With more than 15 million copies sold globally, the album helped cement the band's status as one of the biggest rock acts of the new millennium. "What's My Age Again?", "All the Small Things", and "Adam's Song" became hit singles and MTV staples, generating heavy airplay. Widely regarded as a defining pop-punk record, Enema of the State has had a lasting impact on the genre and beyond; it helped reinvent the sound for a new generation and inspired countless artists, tributes, and accolades.

== Background ==
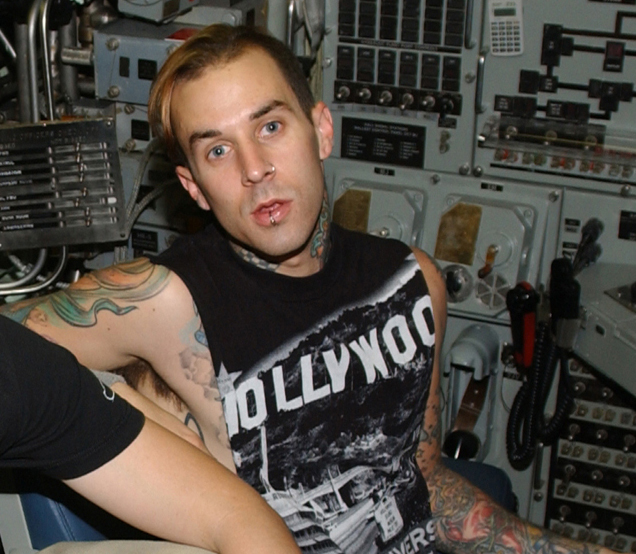
Enema of the State is the first Blink-182 album with drummer Travis Barker, pictured here in 2003.

Blink-182 emerged from the early 1990s San Diego skate-punk scene, forming in 1992 when bassist Mark Hoppus, guitarist Tom DeLonge, and drummer Scott Raynor began writing songs together, united by a shared enthusiasm for West Coast punk and irreverent humor. The trio developed a loyal local following through performances at venues such as SOMA and released their debut album, Cheshire Cat (1995), through Cargo Music. Extensive touring, including appearances on the Vans Warped Tour, expanded the band's audience beyond Southern California, particularly among skateboarding and surfing communities. By the mid-1990s, punk rock was breaking through on a national scale, aided by high-profile releases by bands like Rancid and Green Day. Blink-182 subsequently signed with MCA Records, which released their second album, Dude Ranch (1997). Its lead single, "Dammit", became a modern rock radio hit, substantially increasing the band's profile and touring commitments.

Throughout 1997 and 1998, Blink-182 spent much of the year touring internationally, performing at festivals, headlining long runs, and supporting larger acts. Although audiences continued to grow, the relentless schedule took a toll on the band's internal dynamics. By early 1998, tensions had intensified, particularly surrounding Raynor, whose personal issues and behavior on the road strained relationships within the group. He had initially become frustrated with the band's decision to sign with a major label rather than an independent punk label such as Epitaph Records. He began struggling with alcohol, which began impacting his playing. "One show he dropped his sticks 10 times," DeLonge recalled. He increasingly isolated himself from the rest of the band outside of performances. During the SnoCore Tour, a winter tour featuring Blink-182 alongside ska-punk outfit The Aquabats, morale deteriorated amid difficult travel conditions, mismatched audiences, and mounting disagreements. After he temporarily departed a subsequent tour, Aquabats drummer Travis Barker filled in with only minutes to prepare, learning the 20-song setlist in only 45 minutes. Barker quickly impressed Hoppus and DeLonge, completing the remainder of the tour while performing with both bands each night. Although he initially declined discussions about joining Blink-182 out of respect for Raynor, Barker expressed interest if the position became available, and Hoppus began contacting him regularly as it became clear a lineup change was approaching.

Unlike Raynor, whose playing emphasized traditional double-time punk rhythms, Barker brought exceptional technical ability and a broader musical vocabulary. His personality also complemented the band's dynamic, serving as a quieter foil to the onstage humor of Hoppus and DeLonge. Members of the Aquabats later acknowledged that Barker was a more natural fit for Blink-182 both musically and personally: "We should have looked for a new drummer right then because it was obvious what band he belonged in," admitted the Aquabats' Adam Deibert. Meanwhile, efforts to resolve the conflict with Raynor proved unsuccessful. Over the phone, Hoppus and DeLonge gave him an ultimatum to either stop drinking or enter inpatient rehabilitation. Raynor initially chose to leave the band before later agreeing to seek treatment, but Hoppus and DeLonge had already concluded that the relationship could not continue, and Raynor was dismissed in June 1998. In later years, Raynor acknowledged that the decision had been justified under the circumstances, while the remaining members expressed regret over how the dismissal was handled. Following his departure, Raynor continued performing with other groups and participated in charitable work.

Barker's arrival reinvigorated the band, whose members viewed his musicianship as motivation to improve their own performances. As "Dammit" continued receiving significant radio airplay throughout 1998, Blink-182 graduated from clubs to theater-sized venues during a fall headlining tour, laying the foundation for the commercial breakthrough that followed with their next studio album.

== Recording and production ==
=== Pre-production ===
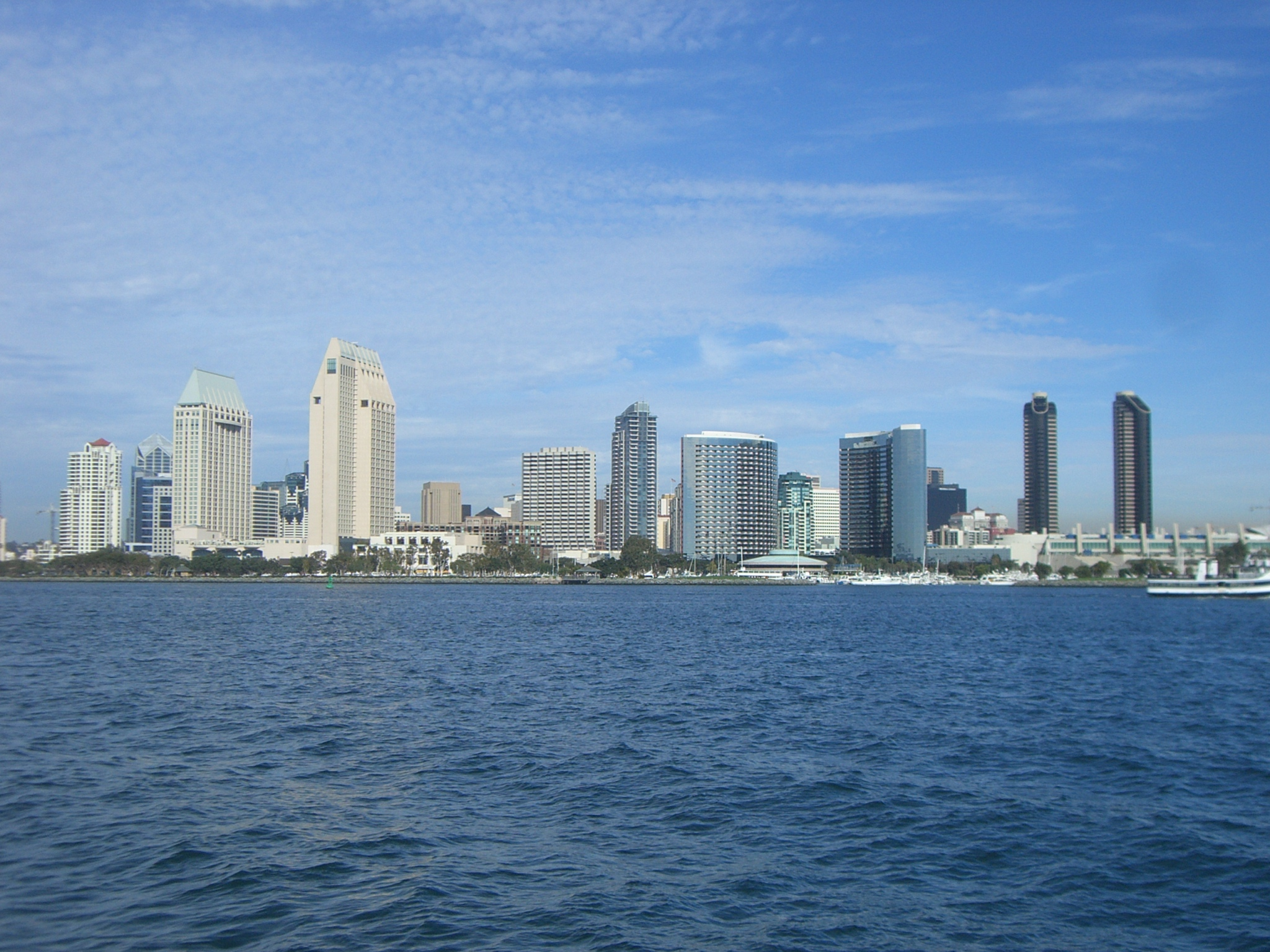
Enema of the State was partially recorded in the band's hometown of San Diego, seen here in 2005.

Prior to developing the album, the band’s principal songwriters, Tom DeLonge and Mark Hoppus, had already begun composing new material. One early song that later appeared on Enema of the State was "Mutt". An initial version was recorded with the band's previous drummer, Scott Raynor. Inspired by DeLonge's surfer roommate Benji Weatherly, the track was created to accompany Weatherly's surf footage in the 1998 film The Show. Later that year, the band were approached about appearing in the raunchy teen comedy American Pie—a project whose irreverent tone closely aligned with the band's image.

For their cameo appearance, the group chose to revisit "Mutt", recording a second version with new drummer Travis Barker. For the session they enlisted producer Jerry Finn, a veteran figure in punk and alternative rock production. Finn had previously mixed Dookie by Green Day—a landmark commercial breakthrough for pop-punk—and had since worked with acts such as Rancid, Jawbreaker, and more. The trio regarded Finn as well beyond their reach and were impressed that he had taken an interest in producing them. Satisfied with the outcome of the session, the band decided to bring Finn on to produce their next album. The remainder of the material for Enema of the State was developed throughout the band's tours that year, where early versions of songs such as "Dumpweed" and "Aliens Exist" were tested live. The first song they wrote with Barker in the band was "Dysentery Gary".

In October 1998, the group decamped to DML Studios to begin pre-production. The modest studio, tucked away in a retail plaza in Escondido, lacked air conditioning. Studio owner Don Lithgow recalled in 2001 that the band’s growing popularity had noticeably changed the atmosphere of their sessions: "All the kids wanted autographs [...] They’d unlock the doors and let kids into the studio, which most bands would never do." Barker drove daily from his residence in Riverside to participate in the writing sessions. According to the band, the core material for the album was completed in roughly two weeks. Although Barker contributed to the development of the songs, and acted as an arranger, only Hoppus and DeLonge received songwriting credits, as Barker was still considered a hired musician rather than a formal member of the band at the time. Among the songs demoed but ultimately left off the album were the unfinished instrumental "Life's So Boring" and "Man Overboard", which addressed the band's split with Raynor. The latter was fully recorded but initially left incomplete as the band struggled to finalize its lyrics.

=== Recording ===
The record label allocated a $300,000 recording budget for the album. The recording process for the album was completed over a period of four months, and production was handled at several production facilities in southern California, including Signature Sound and Studio West in San Diego, Big Fish Studios in Encinitas, and Conway Recording Studios and The Bomb Factory in Los Angeles. The first step was to record drums, which were tracked at Chick Corea's Mad Hatter Studios in L.A. in January 1999. After completing his drum tracks, Barker was largely absent from the remainder of the recording sessions, having left to tour with the Vandals. Afterwards the band tracked guitars, bass and vocals. Finn came with an array of instruments, amps, and effects; previously the band were forced to rent such equipment. Finn was not afraid to critique the young band, delivering sharp feedback that ultimately helped them improve. Hoppus credited Finn with knowing a great deal about punk rock music, but also helping the band establish a more pop-inspired sound. The band had so much fun with Finn that there were days when very little work was accomplished: "Recording can get pretty monotonous, but at least we could laugh with Jerry," recalled Hoppus. "A pretty typical day would involve multiple takes for one part of one song, and then everyone would get naked and jump on Jerry." The band chose "never to work with anyone else again," and Finn would produce their next three releases. For Barker, the album was "fueled by black coffee and Marlboro Lights"; he was hopeful for the album as the band were well-rehearsed and no time would be wasted. According to Barker, the album's title stemmed from DeLonge, who was worried about his diet at the time and using enemas.

At the end of recording, Finn suggested they utilize keyboardist Roger Joseph Manning, Jr., best known for his work with Beck. Hoppus was initially reluctant, noting that most of the band's fans up to that point were hardcore punk rock fans that might not be receptive to keyboard parts. In the end, the group were open to his inclusion: "They welcomed all my ideas and they were super supportive and that's why it was so much fun working with them," Manning later remembered. Recording completed in March 1999 and all parties involved were pleased with the results. "When it was done, we were so stoked. It was like a masterpiece for our band," remembered DeLonge. "We knew this was going to be the best thing we ever did." Hoppus felt the band achieved the purest, cleanest sound on the record that they had been striving for. Finn felt similarly, proud of his work on the record and believing in retrospect that the album would appeal to the masses. "The Party Song" was the final song to be completed, and the three were mixing the song coincidentally when lead single "What's My Age Again?" premiered on Los Angeles-based radio station KROQ. In 2013, Hoppus referred to Enema of the State as "the heart of Blink-182's musical sensibilities," singling out "its simplicity, its purity, its singularity of purpose between the three of us."

=== Technical ===
From a technical perspective, Enema of the State sounds glossier than other pop-punk albums of its era. As the album was recorded on analog tape, the trio put enormous trust into Finn to give the record the polished pop sound they wanted, recalled DeLonge in 2012. Barker used 12 different snare drums on the album, rented from Orange County Drum and Percussion (OCDP). Finn disliked Barker's tendency to tune up his snares, which he felt sounded like popcorn, so Barker for the most part tuned them down during recording for a bigger, tougher sound. Mike Fasano, of OCDP, sat in for Barker during the tuning period, due to his dislike of Finn's meticulous microphone placement process. Barker recorded the majority of his drum tracks in eight hours, without headphones. While later Blink records were recorded with a click track to ensure timing, Enema was recorded live. Finn was impressed—he had been matching the songs to a click in the control room, but found Barker stayed on meter reliably well. Barker kept attempting to tease Finn by sneaking in vibraslaps, which Finn hated.

All of the vocals were recorded with Blue's Bottle condenser tube microphone, which Finn recommended. DeLonge focused on clean and correct vocal takes, trying to sing as best he could. He later felt it was to the record's detriment, as he felt the performances were too processed instead of authentic. DeLonge recorded the album on Fender Stratocaster, with his tone achieved through a Mesa/Boogie Triple Rectifier amplifier. In a September 1999 Guitar Player article, DeLonge outlined his intentions: "I'm the kind of guitarist that wants the biggest, fattest, loudest, sound he can get." While mostly recorded in an analog domain, the album employs some digital processing—for example, on "Don't Leave Me", a guitar swell before the second chorus is produced by reversing the delayed guitar that precedes it. For bass guitar tracks, Hoppus has said that he used Fender Precision and Jazz Basses, as well as a Music Man StingRay (the latter of which he was accustomed to at the time). He eventually gravitated towards the Fender basses, as he and Finn agreed that they sat in the mix better. Hoppus later said in 2021 that he preferred the Fender basses and felt that the StingRay sounded too "clanky".

For Tom Lord-Alge, the main mixing engineer on the album, the band had one goal: "Make it sound as aggressive as possible." Lord-Alge's mixes were completed at his space, South Beach Studios, located in Miami, Florida. Some of the drum sounds were triggered by Lord-Alge during the mixdown process. Lastly, the album was mastered by Brian Gardner at Bernie Grundman Mastering in Hollywood. With a runtime of 35 minutes and 17 seconds, Enema of the State is Blink-182's shortest album to date.

== Musical style and composition ==
Enema of the State is considered by critics as pop-punk and skate punk. Additionally, Loudwire stated that the album represents scene music. The songs on Enema of the State are fast-paced songs regarding "adolescent aimlessness, broken hearts and general confusion over the care and feeding of girls," according to writer Gavin Edwards. Dale Eisinger, writing for Tidal, viewed it "a musical antecedent to Fast Times at Ridgemont High." In the Chicago Tribune, Greg Kot characterized the album as an update of the "flagrantly sarcastic pop-punk tradition" established by Chicago's Screeching Weasel. Summarizing the album's content, The New York Times's Jon Caramanica called Enema of the State a sampling of "ecstatic, goofy numbers about teenage uselessness, with a smattering of tender introspection." The songs are mainly autobiographical, or are inspired by stories from friends' experiences. Enema of the State largely revolves around age and maturity—"more specifically, their lack of it, their attitude toward their lack of it, or their eventual wide-eyed exploration of it," said writer Nitsuh Abebe. DeLonge described the songs on Enema of the State as rooted in youthful romanticism, explaining, "We're really into the whole relationship thing 'cause we're romantics."

DeLonge later reflected on his desire for a more "pop" sound:

Punk rock was becoming polished. NOFX [was] a punk band we grew up listening to, and they had a record called Punk in Drublic, and it was awesome. It was game-changing; it sounded good. We wanted to take it to the next level. [...] There had never been a pop-punk band that sounded like nursery rhymes on steroids, on the mainstream level at least. And that's what I used to have daydreams of. I used to think the radio could use that, could use a band that was really powerful and catchy and fast and youthful and angsty.

Rather than pursuing the breakneck pace of Dude Ranch, the band deliberately emphasized stronger arrangements, vocal harmonies, and melodic songwriting. The shift originated with Blink-182 themselves, although MCA president Jay Boberg encouraged the trio to further refine its songwriting and highlight its melodic sensibilities. On guitar, DeLonge's minimalist style trades solos for riffs: "The riffs I write stand on their own without a rhythm guitar behind them. Riffs keep songs sounding more diverse than the same old chord progressions," he said in 1999. The band’s lack of traditional guitar solos also afforded Barker greater freedom in his arrangements, particularly during bridges, where he was encouraged to experiment and treat his drum parts as an instrumental counterpart to a guitar solo. He hoped to give the songs varying tempos, something missing in the group's prior recordings. "I told Mark and Tom, 'It's going to be repetitive if all our songs have the same punk-rock beat all the time. Why don't we try some different tempos?'" DeLonge noted he was open to his proposals, and responded, "Dude, I just play guitar and write melodies. You own the beats. If you have an idea, that's what you're supposed to do." As a result, songs range from slow ("Adam's Song"), mid-tempo ("Going Away to College"), and fast ("Party Song"). Overall, the band did not initially view Enema of the State as a stylistic departure. Speaking before recording began, DeLonge predicted the album would be "a lot like Dude Ranch" and reaffirmed the band's commitment to "one fast, poppy song after another."

Unlike many bands centered around a single frontman, Enema of the State divides lead vocal duties between bassist Mark Hoppus and guitarist Tom DeLonge, with the pair frequently alternating verses or harmonizing throughout the album. Their contrasting voices became one of the record's defining characteristics: Hoppus' lower, steadier delivery often anchors the band's more reflective or melodic material, while DeLonge's nasal, high-pitched vocal style lends an urgent, youthful energy to the faster and more humorous songs. Eisinger interpreted their interplay through a Beatles analogy, writing: "By the universal standard of projecting the mythology of the Beatles onto any band's sociopolitics, Mark is a prosaic Paul, concerned with stories of heartbreak that anyone could hold close; meanwhile, Tom is the poetic John, speaking more from abstract imagery, anxiety and the encroaching dread of the ultramodern, Internet-saturated culture just a year or two away."

=== Drumming ===
The arrival of Travis Barker marked a significant expansion of the band's musical palette on Enema of the State. Barker's technical proficiency and eclectic influences—including punk rock, hip-hop, and marching percussion—brought a greater degree of rhythmic complexity and versatility to the band's sound. Eisinger summarized his contributions to the album: "In applying melodic, rudimental techniques to punk drumming, Barker instantly became the most iconic drummer since Buddy Rich, Elvin Jones or John Bonham. [...] His hi-hats are almost visibly dripping sweat, finding a shuffle somewhere between ska and techno, his naked ambition transmuted to technique, the breakdowns replete with bells and toms."

Where as other songs in the band's arsenal stayed double-time, Barker worked to add differentiating features: in "The Party Song", he plays in 4/4 time on the bridge with a "jumpy" tom beat, indebted to surf rock, and the choruses in "Anthem" are half-time. He incorporates a Latin samba on "Dysentery Gary": "We actually wrote that bossa nova part a couple days before we went into the studio. It wasn't even supposed to be like that. I just played it as a joke one time during practice when we were writing the songs, because I just got bored of playing the same drum parts, and everyone liked it a lot, so we kept it." On "Going Away to College", Barker settles into a single-stroke snare roll; he played in marching band in high school. In a 2000 interview with Drum!, he explained: "There's this Zildjian Day in New York video where Steve Gadd does a full solo, and for the first five minutes it's all just on snare drum, like a marching beat. I always like the way that sounded, so that's kind of why I put that in the middle of 'Going Away to College.'"

== Songs ==
Green grass, sun, swimming pools, teen boys obsessed with and mildly terrified by sex, jokes about having sex with things that are not other humans, and a healthy side of toilet-oriented gags. This was middle-class teenage life as one great shiny kindergarten, only with alcohol, online pornography, and secondary sexual characteristics. [...] Blink-182 had puppyish enthusiasm, hearts on sleeves, bestiality jokes, much whining about girls, and hooks that sounded like someone doing cannonballs in a backyard pool in August.

— Writer Nitsuh Abebe analyzing the album's carefree themes in New York, 2011

"Dumpweed" opens the album with an anthemic guitar riff and staccato drumming. The song depicts a turbulent relationship and a desire to escape a controlling partner. Its refrain, "I need a girl that I can train," has drawn criticism for its sexist angle. DeLonge later framed the lyric as intentionally self-deprecating, suggesting that men are less perceptive than women and joking that "the dog is the only thing men are smarter than." "Don't Leave Me" continues the album's focus on relationships, with Hoppus taking lead vocals. The breakup song is driven by a crunchy, syncopated three-chord riff that he reportedly wrote in ten minutes. "Aliens Exist" shifts the album's subject matter toward offbeat UFO conspiracy theories, reflecting DeLonge's long-standing fascination with extraterrestrial life and government cover-ups. The lyrics reference conspiracies such as the Majestic 12, and the song was later revisited in commentary on DeLonge's interest in ufology, including his later work with To the Stars and its role in prompting renewed Pentagon attention to unidentified aerial phenomena.

"Going Away to College" examines young love with a sincere and bittersweet tone, placing the listener in the mindset of a teenager confronting separation as partners depart for different universities. It transitions into "What's My Age Again?", which distills the album's recurring theme of arrested maturity. Originally titled "Peter Pan Complex", the song humorously catalogues Hoppus's refusal to grow up. "Dysentery Gary" explores rejection and jealousy, with the narrator venting his frustration by mocking his crush’s partner. The guitar-forward track centers on DeLonge's refrain, "Girls are such a drag." The piano-laced “Adam’s Song” shifts the album into more serious territory, addressing themes of depression and suicide. It emphasizes a slower, more introspective style compared with the album's typically breakneck pace. Sung by Hoppus from a first-person perspective, each verse begins with the line "I never thought I'd die alone."

As a contrast, "All the Small Things" returns to a lighter tone. The song is a straightforward pop love song built around a "na-na-na" vocal hook, and was inspired by the simplicity of the Ramones. A memorable lyric originated during the recording of the album, when DeLonge came home to find roses left on the stairs by his girlfriend, inspiring the line: "She left me roses by the stairs / surprises let me know she cares." "The Party Song" follows with a rapid-fire vocal delivery and galloping rhythm. It was inspired by a party at San Diego State University that Hoppus found pretentious and dull; feeling out of place, he wrote lyrics about wanting to leave and return home. Eisinger called the song a "breathless and comic musical romp. Indebted to the Descendents' "Coffee Mug," the track becomes a game of tag for the band, with choked cymbals and lyrical asides.” "Mutt" depicts a sexually impulsive couple whose relationship is solely driven by physical attraction. "Wendy Clear" follows and was written by Hoppus while touring with MxPx about developing an unexpected crush. The title references his boat, Wendy, and the nautical practice of ending radio transmissions with "clear" to indicate the channel is free. The album closes with "Anthem", which is about being trapped in the suburbs, longing for freedom and the age of 21. It was inspired by an incident from DeLonge's high school years, when he told classmates his band would be performing at a friend's house; the party was later broken up by police, sparking a "giant fight." Hoppus felt it a perfect summary of the album's themes: "lots of youthful angst, energy, and suburban unrest."

== Artwork ==
Back cover of the album, featuring pornographic actress Janine Lindemulder

The cover depicts model Janine Lindemulder in a stylized nurse's uniform, with a red bra visible beneath it. Wearing blue eye shadow, she is shown pulling a latex glove onto her right hand in a suggestive pose. The photograph is framed against a white background, with the album title displayed inside a capsule-shaped logo and the band's name printed above. The band appears on the back cover in their underwear, with Lindemulder preparing for some sort of injection. The album cover has since been described as iconic by numerous publications and is widely regarded as one of the defining images of late-1990s rock. In 2015, Billboard ranked the cover among the top 15 "greatest of all-time," calling it "an image that was burned into the mind of every TRL viewer, one that became instantly iconic."

Art director Tim Stedman oversaw the album's visual identity, although both he and photographer David Goldman have variously credited themselves with conceiving the cover concept in later interviews. During recording, Stedman coined the provisional title Turn Your Head and Cough, reflecting the band's penchant for juvenile humor. Goldman later recalled that the album retained the provisional title until shortly before release, influencing one of the cover's defining visual elements—the latex glove. "Up until the very last minute, the album was going to be called Turn Your Head and Cough," he said. "That's why I came up with the idea of the glove." Other titles the band floated for the album included Vasectomy, Vasecto-you and Does That Look Infected?; a similar title to the latter was later used by the band Sum 41 for their 2002 album, Does This Look Infected?. Goldman later recalled that, despite designing the artwork during the height of the CD era, he intentionally conceived the cover to remain visually striking if enlarged to the dimensions of a 12-inch LP sleeve.

Knowing the band wanted to feature a "sexy nurse" on the cover, Stedman initially suggested model Anna Nicole Smith. MCA staff presented the band with a selection of promotional photographs of glamour models, from which they chose Lindemulder. According to producer Jerry Finn, the band was unaware that Lindemulder worked in the adult film industry until after making their selection. Finn later remarked that the choice was ironic, observing: "It's kind of funny that they've been lumped in with Kid Rock and Limp Bizkit, who play up that kind of pimp lifestyle, because Blink is so not that," remarked Finn. The cover photograph was taken on March 12, 1999, in a rented Los Angeles studio that Goldman and his crew transformed into a mock medical examination room. The set incorporated hospital beds, laboratory equipment, and other props borrowed from Universal Studios, while Goldman sourced the lockers seen throughout the accompanying photography. Goldman later recalled that the members of Blink-182 were visibly star-struck while working with Lindemulder. Stedman described the shoot as relaxed, calling Lindemulder "a total pro", and based the concept around an adolescent fantasy: "Imagine it's the day you're going to have physicals at school and the doctor turns out to be a sexy nurse." Following the shoot, MCA marketing director Paul Orescan established a promotional partnership with Vivid Video, Lindemulder's employer. As part of the campaign, she introduced the band at KROQ Weenie Roast festival and later appeared in the music video for "What's My Age Again?".

The album's medical motif extends throughout its packaging. The booklet features minimalist blue-and-red pictograms modeled after hospital signage and pharmaceutical symbols, while the interior artwork depicts a queue of patients waiting for school physicals, combining the band and their friends with professional models. The individual photographs were digitally composited into a continuous scene using Adobe Photoshop, then an emerging technology that had yet to become commonplace in commercial graphic design. Stedman later observed that the design appealed to Blink-182's predominantly young male audience through its exaggerated adolescent humor, while also featuring shirtless photographs of the band that resonated with its growing female fanbase. Weeks after principal photography had concluded, the band decided to include a close-up photograph of an eyeball in the jewel tray, requiring Goldman to organize an additional photo shoot solely for the insert.

The cover's overtly sexual imagery generated occasional criticism following the album's release. Hoppus rejected suggestions that the band should be viewed as role models, responding: "We don't claim to be role models, but this is mild in my estimation. It's just a picture of a girl." Critics have compared the cover to other sexually provocative album sleeves, including Herb Alpert's Whipped Cream & Other Delights, or Roxy Music's Country Life.

=== Alternate editions ===
The album's original red cross emblem was later removed after the American Red Cross objected to its unauthorized use.

The album's artwork underwent several revisions following its release. Early pressings featured the protected Red Cross emblem on Lindemulder's nurse's cap, as well as a capital "B" in the Blink-182 logo. The latter was quickly revised to the band's preferred lowercase styling. More significantly, the American Red Cross objected to the commercial use of its emblem, notifying MCA Records that its unauthorized use violated protections afforded to the symbol under the Geneva Conventions. Art director Tim Stedman later said he was disappointed the band and label did not challenge the request, but that MCA's legal department insisted the emblem be removed. Subsequent pressings replaced the red cross with a plain white nurse's cap.

Additional alterations were made for certain international markets. A Malaysian edition censored the artwork by replacing Lindemulder's exposed cleavage with a red shirt and adding clothing to the band members on the back cover, while retaining the original Red Cross emblem.

== Promotion ==
Following the commercial breakthrough of Dude Ranch, MCA Records substantially increased its investment in Blink-182, viewing them as a "marquee act" for the label. Determined to capitalize on the band's momentum, manager Rick DeVoe kept Blink-182 on a relentless promotional schedule, explaining that his philosophy was to "strike while the iron's hot." The label mobilized its publicity, promotion, and sales departments to support the release through press coverage, radio promotion, in-store appearances, autograph signings, and prominent retail displays. Boberg later said MCA approached Blink-182 as a "lifestyle-oriented band", initially marketing the trio to its established skateboarding fanbase before broadening the campaign to mainstream audiences. He likened the strategy to the label's successful promotion of Sublime, explaining that once the label had "tapped into Blink's skateboarding core", it "was able to spread into the greater population." DeVoe later said MCA built upon the band's existing grassroots success, aiming to establish Blink-182 as the next major mainstream punk act after Green Day. He further described KROQ's support as an important marketing lever in the band's growth, with airplay at the influential Los Angeles station encouraging other stations to follow suit.

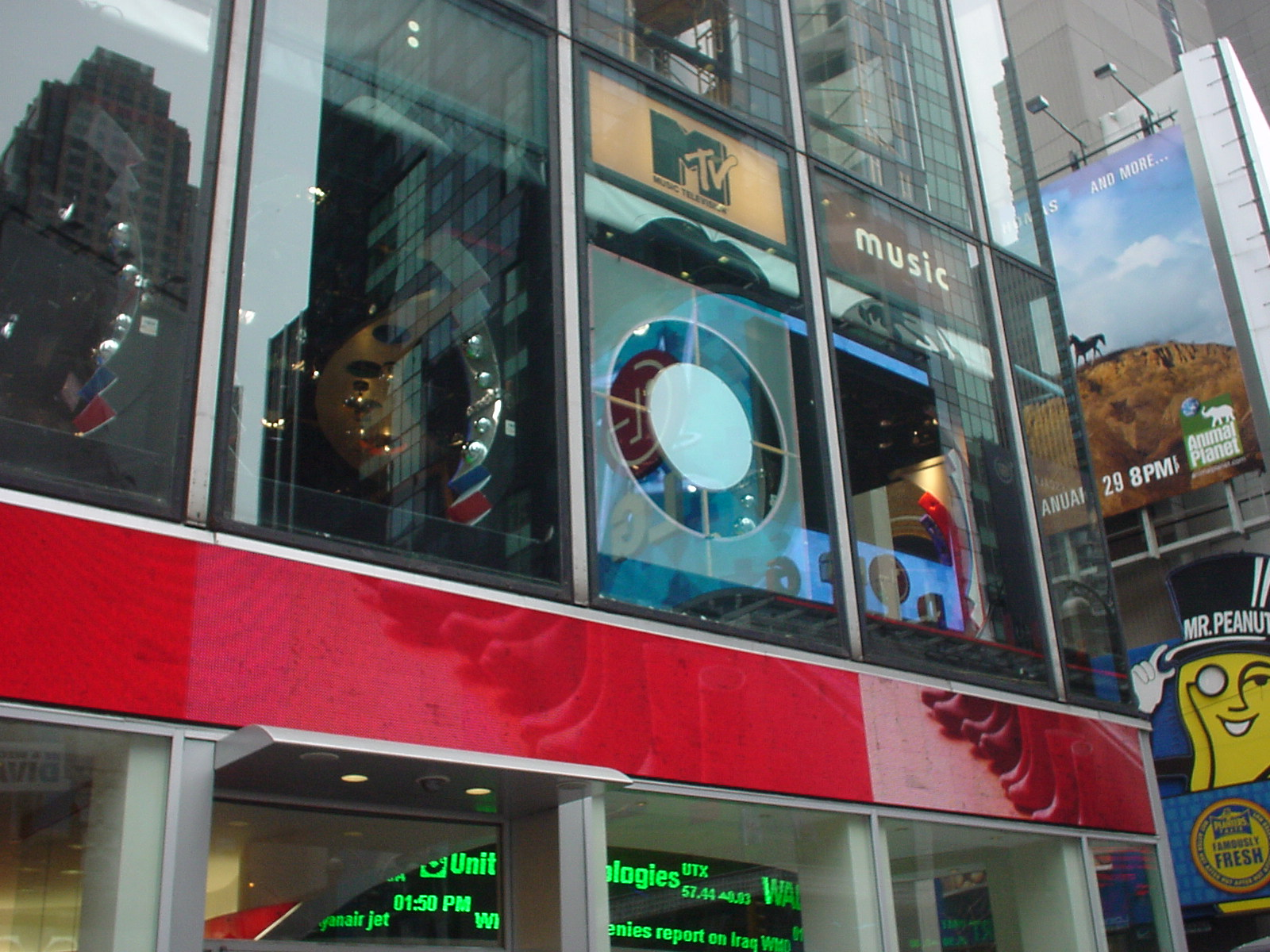
The band became regular guests on MTV's TRL, whose Times Square studio, seen here, hosted many of their appearances.

The album's breakthrough coincided with the rise of MTV's Total Request Live (TRL), where Blink-182 became frequent guests. TRL debuted in 1998 and quickly became one of MTV's flagship programs, introducing its daily after-school audience to millions of young viewers. The network heavily rotated the album's music videos, while the band made regular in-studio appearances, guest-hosted MTV programming, and participated in network specials. Hoppus later described the partnership as "mutually beneficial", recalling that "MTV loved our antics and we loved the cameras." Blink-182 became fixtures of the network, appearing so frequently on TRL that several of their videos were eventually retired from the countdown. Their irreverent humor and willingness to parody both themselves and contemporary pop culture made them one of the channel's defining rock acts during the TRL era, amid a climate of teen pop and boy bands.

In the public eye, Blink-182 became nearly as well known for their juvenile antics as for their music. MCA also financed a behind-the-scenes documentary to accompany the album. The band titled the video The Urethra Chronicles, while manager Rick DeVoe served as director, recruiting friends and crew members from filmmaker Taylor Steele's surf videos to help with production. The video for "What's My Age Again?", in which the band runs around nude, cemented a public perception as the "naked band", and the band and label leaned into this imagery for promotional appearances. At the 1999 Billboard Music Awards, the trio opened the show with copies of Billboard obscuring their nudity, and they later performed nude on the sitcom Two Guys and a Girl. Blink-182 additionally performed on American programs including The Tonight Show with Jay Leno, Saturday Night Live, and The Howard Stern Show, while also appearing on influential international broadcasts such as Canada's MusiquePlus and Italy's Quelli che... il calcio. Famously, Blink-182 made a cameo appearance in the teen comedy American Pie, released several weeks after Enema of the State. Songs from Enema of the State were included in both the film and its soundtrack. In the film, the trio appear in a scene in which they are interrupted rehearsing to see a webcast on a computer.

Despite their irreverent image, the band generally cooperated with most promotional demands that accompanied their growing popularity. The band made the covers of publications like Rolling Stone, and also teen magazines like CosmoGirl and Teen People, signaling its appeal beyond punk audiences. Hoppus later recalled the experience with amusement: "Pull out the blink-182 insert poster and read five fun facts about Travis!" Although appearances such as MTV Spring Break in Florida occasionally felt outside their comfort zone, they typically participated anyway. DeVoe said his philosophy was that the band should never become “too cool” for such opportunities and encouraged them to take advantage of what came their way. Looking back, Hoppus acknowledged that Blink-182 had willingly "played the pop music game, and did everything that was asked of us." At the same time, he expressed mixed feelings about the band's sudden commercialization, writing that although mainstream radio and magazine coverage "didn't hurt our band's image," the trio eventually "soured on the experience" as "huge multinational corporations were selling us on a large scale."

== Commercial performance ==
The record guys [MCA] sat us down and prepared us for three things. First, they said, 'You'll be more famous than you ever thought. Second, you'll have more money than you ever thought. And third, you're going to play more arenas then you ever thought.' I laughed at them. I said, 'That guy's on crack!'

— Tom DeLonge

Before Enema of the State reached store shelves, MCA executives immediately recognized its commercial potential. In his memoir, Barker recalled that label staff "freaked out" after receiving the completed record, convinced it would become a blockbuster. According to manager Rick DeVoe, MCA president Jay Boberg was similarly enthusiastic, telling him that Blink-182 would soon be headlining arenas. Sales targets were higher than its predecessor. In May 1999, the Los Angeles Times ran a Sunday feature on the band two days prior to release, noting that "The musicians are sanguine about chances to repeat or exceed the sales of Dude Ranch, noting the always-shifting sands of pop culture and that they've already done better than they'd ever anticipated." Momentum began to build when US radio stations received advance copies of Enema of the State ahead of its June 1 bow. On release day, the trio were in Detroit for a free secret show sponsored by Coca-Cola. In his book, Hoppus reflects that the event may have been too secret — the ticket giveaway promotion failed to gain traction, leaving the band handing out tickets to anyone who happened to walk by.

Over its first tracking week, the release peaked at number nine on the U.S. Billboard 200. The album chart was gripped by the Backstreet Boys' Millennium, but Enema of the State still managed to move 109,000 units that week. The band was supporting Lagwagon in Europe when MCA executives phoned the trio about rising record sales. Joey Cape, frontman of Lagwagon, remarked that "They were selling, like, 90,000 records a day [...] I was saying things like, 'What are you doing here? Go home! Why do you want to be on tour with Lagwagon right now?" At a show shortly following the release of the album, DeLonge was approached by Noodles from The Offspring to congratulate him. "He looks at me right in the eyes and he goes, 'You're next,'" remembered DeLonge, who blushed and shook off the compliment.

Enema of the State became a smash hit, and became MCA's biggest album of 1999. It sold strongly and nearly four times as fast as Dude Ranch, and shipped gold to stores, which meant that retailers had placed advance orders for more than 500,000 copies by the album's release. Its predecessor took seven months to achieve that certification. According to MCA, Enema of the State first achieved commercial momentum in Italy before breaking more broadly in other international markets. The album enjoyed a lengthy domestic run on the Billboard 200, remaining on the chart for 86 weeks, including five weeks in which it sold more than 100,000 copies. The LP went platinum in October 1999 and went triple platinum in January 2000; in February 2001, the album was certified five times platinum in the United States by the Recording Industry Association of America. The record performed well in international markets as well. Enema of the State went quadruple platinum in Canada and triple platinum in Australia. It peaked at number seven on the Canadian Albums Chart, but peaked the highest worldwide on the New Zealand Albums Chart (number two), where it was certified double platinum. It was also certified double platinum in Italy, platinum in the United Kingdom, and gold in six other territories (Austria, Germany, Indonesia, Mexico, the Philippines, and Switzerland). In Europe, the album sold over one million copies. Enema of the State also benefited from the growing influence of the Internet; it became one of the top-selling albums through online retailers.

As of 2016, Enema of the State remains the highest seller in the band's catalogue, moving 4.6 million units to date in the U.S., according to Nielsen SoundScan.

== Singles ==
"What's My Age Again?"
"What's My Age Again?" displays the more polished, pop music-inspired sound the band strived for on Enema of the State.

To promote Enema of the State, MCA Records released three singles in support: "What's My Age Again?," "All the Small Things," and "Adam's Song." This followed a standard formula labels used for rock albums in the nineties, where the lead single would be high-energy and upbeat, the follow-up more of an album cut, and the third single a ballad. The singles were bigger than anyone in the band expected, crossing over into Top 40 radio format and experiencing major commercial success. "What's My Age Again?" became an "airplay phenomenon," achieving mass success on both radio and television. It achieved the highest success on Billboard's Modern Rock Tracks chart, where it peaked at number two. It registered within the top 20 on UK Singles Chart as well, peaking at number 17. The music video for "What's My Age Again?," directed by Marcos Siega, famously depicted the band running naked through the streets of Los Angeles. A clip of the band streaking opened the 1999 Billboard Awards and the band's affinity for nudity would be referenced in interviews for years to come.

"All the Small Things," released in early 2000, became an even bigger success — it crossed over from alt-rock radio to contemporary hit radio, peaking at number six on Billboard Hot 100 and number one on the Modern Rock Tracks chart. This track stayed at the top of the Modern Rock Tracks chart for eight weeks and remained in the top 10 for 20 weeks. It also peaked at number two on the official UK charts, and within the top ten in Italy, Ireland, Austria, Sweden and Australia. The music video for "All the Small Things" parodies boy bands and contemporary pop videos, and features the trio participating in choreographed dancing and dressing up as members of Backstreet Boys, 98 Degrees, and 'N Sync. "I was a little surprised it went over so well," recalled Marcos Siega, director of the clip, commenting that he felt it would offend viewers of TRL and boy band fans. "I think we had the opposite effect. In some ways, I think that video put Blink at that sort of pop level with those other bands. We were making fun of them, but it kind of became [what it was making fun of]." At the 2000 MTV Video Music Awards, it was nominated for Video of the Year and Best Pop Video, and won Best Group Video.

The third and final single, "Adam's Song," performed less substantially than the first two but still managed to peak at number two on Billboard's Alternative Songs chart. The band was engulfed in controversy when Greg Barnes, a survivor of the Columbine High School massacre, set "Adam's Song" on repeat on his stereo and committed suicide in May 2000. Hoppus was very upset when he got the call from band manager Rick DeVoe explaining what happened, as he intended the track as an anti-suicide song. Rolling Stone later compared the controversy to that of Ozzy Osbourne's "Suicide Solution." Despite that controversy, it managed to connect deeply with fans of the band, who wrote letters to the band remarking the track saved their lives during difficult situations.

== Critical reception ==
=== Initial response ===
Professional ratings
Review scores
Source	Rating
AllMusic	4/5 stars
Billboard	4.5/5 stars
Chicago Sun-Times	3/4 stars
E! Online	B
Kerrang!	3/5
Pitchfork	7.5/10
Rolling Stone	3/5 stars
The Rolling Stone Album Guide	4/5 stars
USA Today	3/4 stars
The Village Voice	A−

Enema of the State received generally favorable initial reviews from critics, although some found its lyrical content juvenile. Writing in The New York Times, Ann Powers named the album her "Album of the Week", praising Blink-182 as "tight and light on its feet" and arguing that beneath its crude humor lay "insight, if not profundity." She also highlighted the vocal interplay between Hoppus and DeLonge, writing that the pair "play goofs more self-aware than they should be." Stephen Thomas Erlewine of AllMusic described it as a "fun record that's better than the average neo-punk release." Rolling Stone's Neva Chonin found it "harmless, but still gnarly enough to foment the kind of anti-everything rebellion that spawned rock & roll way back in the day." Jane Ganahl of the San Francisco Examiner described Enema of the State as "an album with a higher standard of excellence than the title—or the cover art of a porn queen in a nurse's outfit—would suggest."

Billboard's Paul Verna called the record "short, to the point, and bristling with attitude," while a Kerrang! critic wrote that the album includes "enough energy, attitude and cracking songs here to ensure that Blink will be remembered for more than just onstage nudity." Alan Sculley of the St. Louis Post-Dispatch observed: "[They] may not be rock’s most innovative group. But DeLonge and Hoppus know a good hook when they write one," calling the album "extremely catchy, tightly constructed and played with plenty of energy and heart." Marco Rossi of the Dorset Echo argued that Enema of the State shared the defining qualities of the Ramones' debut album, writing that it "shares all the qualities which made the first Ramones album ... such a wall-to-wall classic." He observed that "all the songs sound the same as each other, they're all taken at a totally unrealistic speed-of-light pace, they all sound like they belong on the radio and they all knowingly parade their dumbness with a pride which suggests a couple of smart cookies at the songwriting tiller."

Stephen Thompson at The A.V. Club found it "hard to hate", writing, "the trio's hooky music [is] as smartly conceived as its lyrics [are] stupid." Journalist Jon Wiederhorn, writing an early editorial review for Amazon.com, viewed it favorably: "The songs are more dynamic and multitempoed than those on Dude Ranch, sounding like a cross between the Descendents and Fountains of Wayne. And unlike the glut of alt-rock releases that offer one or two memorable songs, Enema is flush with instantly memorable melodies and ear-pleasing harmonies." NME was vicious in its assessment, with reviewer Stevie Chick calling the record despicable, "wholly toothless and soulless" and deriding the band as "as bad, as meaningless, as the cock-rockers and hippy wankers punk originally sought to destroy."

=== Retrospective reviews ===
In the decades since its debut, Enema of the State has been widely hailed as a pop-punk classic. (Note: A list of sources describing the LP in those terms follows:) It has been referred to as career-defining for the group, their magnum opus. In 2011, Jon Caramanica at The New York Times credited the record with "[taking] punk's already playful core and [giving] it a shiny, accessible polish," calling it "among the catchiest music of the time." Jeremy Gordon at Pitchfork called the record sensitive and juvenile in equal measure; an "amazingly effective" combo. Jeff Yerger from Stereogum viewed it as a spiritual canon successor to Dookie, calling it "the strongest set of songs [Blink] ever wrote [...] the chemistry between the three members is instantly gratifying." Billboard described the album as a "classic" in a retrospective review, calling it the "catchiest batch of songs the band had ever written," and commending the leap in quality both in production and vocals in comparison to its predecessor.

Kelefa Sanneh, writing in The New Yorker, observed that the band's "commitment to juvenile humor" on the album "camouflaged an equal interest in the evergreen pop topic of adolescent melancholy." Amanda Petrusich, at the same publication, called the album a canonical rock entry and refreshing in the modern day. Andy Greene of Rolling Stone dubbed it a "landmark," while Dan Weiss, writing for The Recording Academy, praised its "remarkably clean-sounding guitars, [and] the hyperactive drumming of Barker." Alternative Press has ranked Enema of the State among Jerry Finn's top production work, and UK-based music magazine Rock Sound rated it number 2 on their list of "101 Modern Classics" in 2012, writing, "Enema didn't just bring pop-punk to the masses, it marked a complete shift in how music television, radio and the world at large viewed it."

=== Criticism ===
The success of the album, as well as its cleaner sound and the group's appearances on MTV, caused many longtime fans to accuse the band of "selling out." MCA president Boberg dismissed the concerns, remarking, "For every 10 fans we lose, we gain 10,000." Amy Sciarretto of CMJ New Music Report defended Blink-182 against accusations of selling out, arguing that the band's commercial success had obscured its punk roots. Many commentators stated that the band's polished pop sound only remotely resembled punk music. Although the video for "All the Small Things" was filmed as a mockery of boy bands and teen pop, "fame [didn't] discriminate based on origin: soon the group was as famous as those it was parodying." "Blink now had the backing of a major record company ... just like the synthesized pop acts they were spoofing," said British journalist Tim Footman. "In what way were they less 'pop' than Sugar Ray and 98 Degrees?" Matt Diehl, author of the book My So-Called Punk, called the basis for satire thin: "To seasoned ears, Blink-182 sounded and looked just as manufactured as the pop idols they were poking fun at." To this point, during a 2000 visit to Italy, the band were treated with a Beatlemania-type fervor. In his memoir, Fahrenheit-182, Hoppus recalls fans chasing their motorcade and beating on the windows after an appearance on TRL Italia. Indeed, the overseas arm of Universal had marketed the trio like a boy band—down to Barker as the cute, tattooed "bad boy".

As blink-182's popularity grew, the band faced criticism for encouraging female fans to throw bras onstage, leading some commentators to accuse the group of sexism. Tristin Laughter, employee of Bay Area record label Lookout! Records, wrote in an issue of the influential zine Punk Planet that the band would have a genuinely negative impact on punk and accused the band of misogyny. DeLonge dismissed the criticism, arguing that provoking the punk establishment was more in keeping with the genre's spirit than conforming to its expectations. "I think it's so much more punk to piss people off than to conform [...] I hate with a passion Maximumrocknroll and all those zines that think they know what punk is supposed to be." Meanwhile, Hoppus argued that the band's lyrics often celebrated independent women through songs such as "Josie", while maintaining that its crude jokes were primarily self-deprecating and that most concertgoers understood that "the joke" was on the band rather than its targets. Ska veterans Blue Meanies tried to empathize: "I think they [Blink] are just trying to get in the mindset of a teenager, which means a lot of curiosity about sex." Responding to accusations that blink-182's lyrics were misogynistic, Jane Ganahl of the San Francisco Examiner argued that songs such as "Going Away to College" revealed a far more vulnerable perspective, portraying awkwardness, longing, and unrequited affection rather than machismo.

Additionally, the band faced backlash from punk and emo acts who distanced themselves from their music. John Lydon, frontman of the Sex Pistols and Public Image Ltd, dismissed the band as a "bunch of silly boys ... an imitation of a comedy act." Green Day's Billie Joe Armstrong remained diplomatic on the band: "It's gonna be tough for them. They're gonna be judged by a couple of songs for a while."

In 2014, Tom Hawking of Flavorwire included the album in his list of "The 50 Worst Albums Ever Made", in which he said: "I like the millennial generation. [...] I generally enjoy their company, and I respect their tastes... EXCEPT for their inexplicable fondness for blink-182. And pop-punk in general. But especially blink-182. C'mon, kids, I'm on your side. Work with me here."

== Touring ==
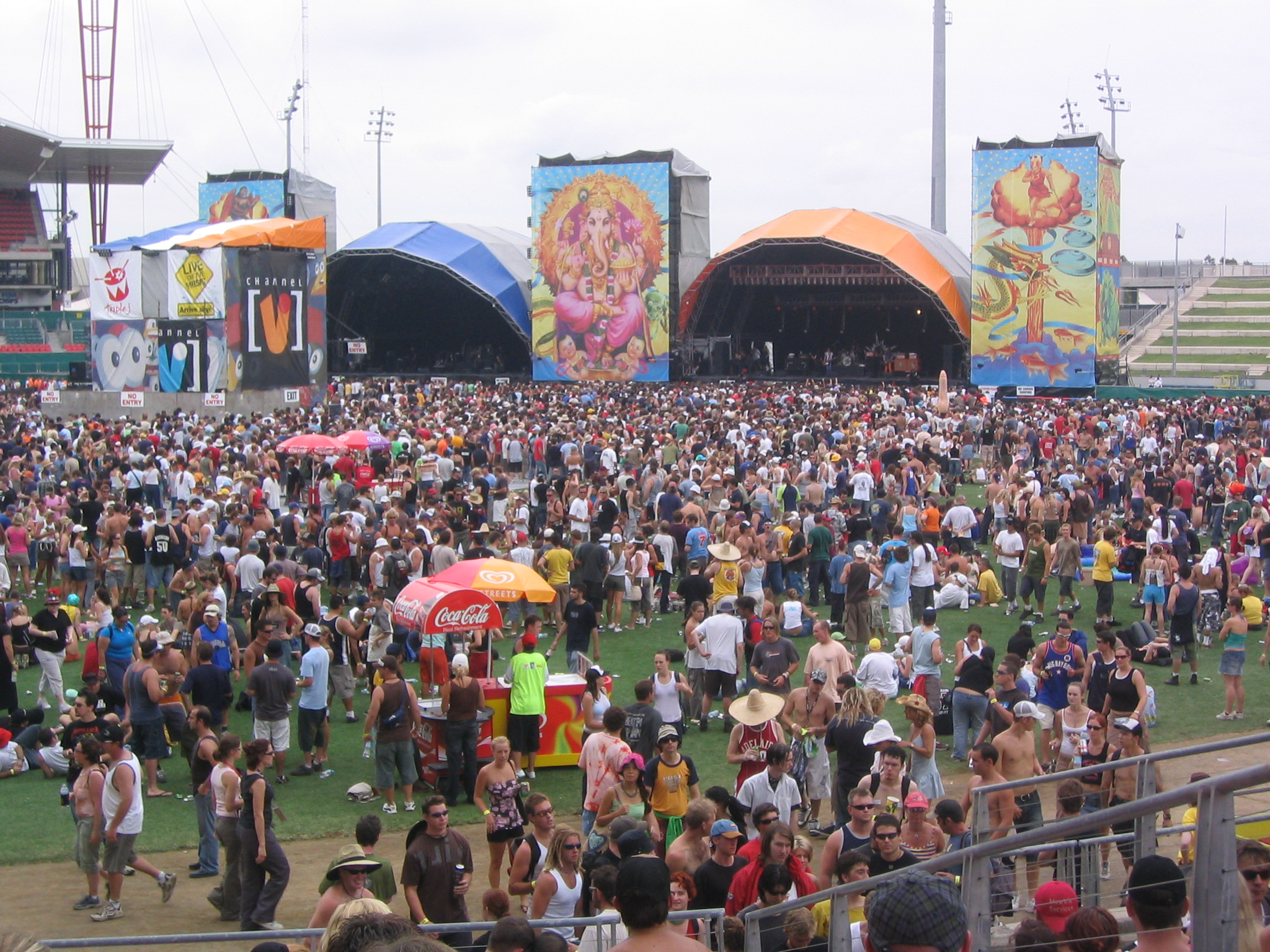
Blink-182's performance at Big Day Out 2000 later became one of the band's best-known live recordings.

Blink-182 spent nearly two years on the road supporting the album, as Enema of the State transformed the band from a club and theater act into an arena-level attraction. Drummer Travis Barker later wrote that the album "took us all over the world, for months at a time," recalling the surreal experience of performing alongside pop acts such as Britney Spears and Christina Aguilera after spending years touring with indie punk bands. Longtime booking agent Rick Bonde, who had handled the band's live dates since 1995, retired from the concert industry, prompting manager Rick DeVoe to move Blink-182's booking to CAA's Darryl Eaton, a close friend who had helped launch the Warped Tour. The band began partnering with more experienced tour managers to handle the heavier workload. Simultaneously, Blink-182 became as famous for their comedic between-song banter as the music itself. Shows were characterized by rapid-fire pacing, juvenile improvisational dialogue between songs, and deliberately crude jokes, while the performances themselves often favored energy over technical precision. Hoppus later described the shows as "the worst, most obscene" material, recalling that he and DeLonge constantly tried "to outdo the other and say the most ridiculous thing on stage."

The band began supporting the album with their third appearance on the traveling Warped Tour. Next, they began an extensive European tour, which included appearances at the Reading and Leeds festivals and concerts throughout Italy, Spain, France and other countries. Returning to North America, the band embarked on the Loserkids Tour with Silverchair and Fenix TX, which marked their first major arena outing, before crossing the Atlantic again for another European leg. The year concluded with a series of domestic holiday radio gigs, plus a headlining slot on MTV's New Year's Eve 2000 celebration, which was broadcast live from Times Square to mark the turn of the millennium. In early 2000, the band embarked on a trip through Australia, including an appearance at Big Day Out, a multi-city rock festival. Footage from Big Day Out and the band's subsequent MTV Spring Break performance in Daytona Beach, Florida, later circulated widely. A more extensive European tour followed in March, although several dates were postponed after both DeLonge and Barker contracted strep throat. Later that summer, the band returned to Europe for additional festival appearances, including Reading and Leeds, Bizarre Festival and the Lowlands Festival.

As attendance increased throughout 1999 and 2000, the group upgraded its live production with larger lighting rigs, video screens, pyrotechnics, and a more elaborate stage setup. The culmination of the touring cycle came with the 33-date Mark, Tom and Travis Show Tour during the summer of 2000. Supported by Bad Religion and Fenix TX, the tour featured the band's most elaborate stage production to that point. Designed around a 1950s drive-in movie theater, it incorporated a giant billboard suspended above the stage, retro-inspired artwork, enhanced lighting and laser effects, and projected films featuring aliens, B-movie imagery and deliberately absurd clips—including vintage gay porn as a running joke. Barker broke a finger during the tour following an altercation in Ohio, prompting Fenix TX guitarist Damon Delapaz to temporarily fill in on drums. Hoppus later described selling out the Great Western Forum in Los Angeles as one of the defining moments of the band's rise. The arena tour sold 80 percent of tickets, grossing about $7 million, and was documented on the live album The Mark, Tom, and Travis Show (The Enema Strikes Back!) (2000). During the tour, the band additionally performed at a high school prom sponsored by Los Angeles radio station KROQ, and also took part in an early webcast, which broadcast their concert from the Casbah in San Diego in July 2000.

The final major performance of the Enema of the State era came on September 7, 2000, with Blink-182's performance of "All the Small Things" at the 2000 MTV Video Music Awards at Radio City Music Hall, where the band had earlier won Best Group Video. During the performance, the stage filled with little people descending on wires, performing on miniature trampolines and Razor scooters before joining together in a celebratory kick line.

== Legacy ==
Enema of the State was a blockbuster success, transforming Blink-182 into mainstream stars at the height of late-1990s rock radio and MTV. Its singles, particularly "All the Small Things", became staples for beginner guitar players and backyard bands, while also emerging as millennial karaoke standards. The album’s widely circulated music videos—especially their parody-driven visual style—made the band fixtures on MTV during the network's final years of dominant cultural influence. Blink-182 became one of the last major rock bands to break into global pop culture before the rise of Napster and digital distribution disrupted traditional pathways to ubiquitous fame, which made it increasingly difficult for guitar-based bands to attain mass-market dominance. Their Southern California sensibility also spread globally: fans in countries far from the band’s origins began adopting skate and surf-inspired brands like Billabong, Vans, and Dickies, reflecting the group’s influence on youth fashion. The band members capitalized on this attention through lifestyle ventures, particularly Travis Barker through his clothing label Famous Stars and Straps, which grew into a multimillion-dollar enterprise across the 2000s.

As the century turned, Enema of the State came to represent rock's final foothold in a fading monoculture. Their peppy sound was a counterpoint to other rock trends of the era, such as nu-metal and post-grunge. Their prankish camaraderie also diverged with the often angry and violent moods associated with those genres. Hoppus later attributed the album's success in part to its contrast with the prevailing rock landscape, recalling that radio "was all about Korn and Kid Rock and hip-hop, and ours was like the only sing-along kind of upbeat melodic pop song that was on the radio." He argued that blink-182's optimistic approach "stood out so much from what everybody else was doing" amid what he viewed as the overwhelmingly negative tone of contemporary rock.

The album has also been considered through a broader cultural lens. Amanda Petrusich at The New Yorker analyzed its place in a pre-9/11 world, suggesting its "playful, featherbrained temperament [was] made possible only by a decade in which prosperity and safety seemed nearly guaranteed." She further argued it helped engineer ("or at least further normalize") a pervasive Western embrace of arrested development, and especially "the practice of rejecting traditional beacons of manhood." Entertainment Weekly called it the "perfect encapsulation of the American adolescent male mind-set circa 1999." Nitsuh Abebe of New York emphasized that ubiquity: "After you figure in singles, videos, CD-R burns, copies on repeat in friends' cars and finished basements, this was apparently enough to create blanket immersion among America's twenty-some million teenagers."

Meanwhile, the album's iconography became shorthand for 1990s ephemera. Its "sexy nurse" cover has persisted in the public imagination, with fans frequently recreating the look as a Halloween costume. Other elements of the album likewise entered popular culture: the lyric "Nobody likes you when you're 23" from "What's My Age Again?" became a widely quoted birthday refrain among millennials. Dale Eisinger wrote an essay on the album for Tidal in 2019, and called it "a message-in-a-bottle from an island of youth within the ocean of resentment that flooded Generation X. Enema of the State flew in the face of all established cultural norms, from mainstream to underground. [...] It became a gateway drug for a new generation of kids captivated by the ever-evident contradictions of late-stage liberal capitalism."

=== Influence ===
Enema of the State is widely regarded as one of the most influential rock albums of the 1990s. It was a watershed moment for pop-punk, injecting the genre’s core elements—punk energy, adolescent irreverence, and melodic immediacy—with a high-gloss pop sensibility. Its polished sound drew criticism from some punk circles, who viewed the band as overly commercial or stylistic departures from earlier punk traditions; groups like NOFX dismissed the band’s popularity as derivative. While Green Day had already achieved multi-platinum success earlier in the decade, its Berkeley-born political sensibility contrasted sharply with Blink-182's youthful, comedic tone—making Enema of the State a catalyst for a different, more pop-oriented branch of punk. Its widespread popularity contributed to the erosion of regional scene boundaries; pop-punk bands began emerging far beyond Southern California, influenced by the album’s accessibility and style. As pop-punk and emo converged through the early 2000s, the LP was sometimes cited as an early emo-pop breakthrough. For years, the album and band became synonymous with the subgenre.

Rob Harvilla of The Ringer argued that this "audacious" combination of juvenile irreverence and genuine vulnerability became one of the defining characteristics of guitar-driven rock in the decades that followed. Its influence extended across multiple generations and genres. Y2K-era artists such as Michelle Branch, Simple Plan and Avril Lavigne have cited the record as an inspiration. Mid-aughts emo bands, including The Maine, Mayday Parade, and Yellowcard collectively called it foundational, while critics noted remnants of the sound in groups like Fall Out Boy and Panic! at the Disco. Later revivalists such as The Story So Far and Neck Deep continued its lineage, while punk-adjacent indie acts such as the Hotelier, Joyce Manor and Turnover have also cited it as formative. The record even influenced emo rap and pop-punk crossover artists—including Machine Gun Kelly—who adapted its melodic and emotional vocabulary. Critic Ian Cohen, writing for Pitchfork, observed that "In a literal sense, many indie bands evolved not from Velvet Underground or Sonic Youth, but Smash, Dookie, or Enema of the State—records that served as beginner's manuals and inspired musicians in great numbers to buy their first guitar." The album has been compared to similar canonical rock albums like Nirvana's Nevermind.

While several songs from the album have been covered by other artists, some have covered the album in full. Indie singer-songwriter Madi Diaz released a Bandcamp-only acoustic cover of the album titled Enema Of The Garden State in 2025, positioning it as an anti-authoritarian antidote to the ICE age.

=== Accolades ===
Publication	Country	Accolade	Year	Rank
Blender	United States	500 CDs You Must Own Before You Die	2003	*
Guitar World	United States	100 Greatest Guitar Albums	2006	66
Kerrang!	United Kingdom	50 Greatest Punk Albums Ever	2006	14
Kerrang!	United Kingdom	100 Greatest Rock Albums	2006	85
Rock Sound	United Kingdom	Top 150 Albums of Our Lifetime (1992–2006)	2006	15
Rock Sound	United Kingdom	101 Modern Classic Albums	2012	2
Rock Sound	United Kingdom	The 51 Most Essential Pop Punk Albums of All Time	2014	1
Billboard	United States	The 50 Greatest Album Covers of All Time	2015	13
Spin	United States	The 300 Best Albums of the Past 30 Years (1985–2014)	2015	134
Kerrang!	United Kingdom	51 Greatest Pop Punk Albums Ever	2015	1
Rolling Stone	United States	40 Greatest Punk Albums of All Time	2016	37
Rolling Stone	United States	50 Greatest Pop-Punk Albums	2017	2
Loudwire	United States	The 50 Greatest Pop-Punk Albums of All Time	2022	2

* denotes an unordered list

== Track listing ==
=== Original release ===
All tracks are written by Mark Hoppus and Tom DeLonge, except where noted.

No.	Title	Lead vocals	Length
1.	"Dumpweed"	DeLonge	2:23
2.	"Don't Leave Me"	Hoppus	2:23
3.	"Aliens Exist"	DeLonge	3:13
4.	"Going Away to College"	Hoppus	2:59
5.	"What's My Age Again?"	Hoppus	2:28
6.	"Dysentery Gary"	DeLonge; Hoppus	2:45
7.	"Adam's Song"	Hoppus	4:09
8.	"All the Small Things"	DeLonge	2:48
9.	"The Party Song"	Hoppus	2:19
10.	"Mutt" (Hoppus, DeLonge, Scott Raynor)	DeLonge	3:23
11.	"Wendy Clear"	Hoppus	2:50
12.	"Anthem"	DeLonge	3:37
Total length:			35:17

Japanese limited edition bonus tracks
No.	Title	Writer(s)	Lead vocals	Length
13.	"Dumpweed" (live in London)		DeLonge	3:25
14.	"What's My Age Again?" (live in London)		Hoppus	3:18
15.	"All the Small Things" (live in London)		DeLonge	4:05
16.	"Dammit" (live in London)	Hoppus; DeLonge; Scott Raynor	Hoppus; DeLonge	2:36
17.	"Mutt" (live in Los Angeles)		DeLonge	3:10
18.	"Aliens Exist" (live in Los Angeles)		DeLonge	3:16
Total length:				54:47

Australian tour edition bonus tracks
No.	Title	Writer(s)	Lead vocals	Length
13.	"Pathetic" (live in Los Angeles)	Hoppus; DeLonge; Raynor	Hoppus; DeLonge	3:04
14.	"Untitled" (live in Los Angeles)	Hoppus; DeLonge; Raynor	DeLonge	2:45
15.	"Josie" (live in Los Angeles)	Hoppus; DeLonge; Raynor	Hoppus	4:17
16.	"Aliens Exist" (live in Los Angeles)		DeLonge	3:16
Total length:				48:39

=== Australian tour edition ===
Bonus disc
No.	Title	Writer(s)	Lead vocals	Length
1.	"All the Small Things" (single edit)		DeLonge	2:54
2.	"Dumpweed" (live in London)		DeLonge	3:25
3.	"What's My Age Again?" (live in London)		Hoppus	3:18
4.	"All the Small Things" (live in London)		DeLonge	4:05
5.	"Dammit" (live in London)	Hoppus; DeLonge; Raynor	Hoppus; DeLonge	2:36
Total length:				15:38

== Personnel ==
Adapted from Enema of the State's liner notes.

Blink-182

- Mark Hoppus – bass, vocals
- Tom DeLonge – guitars, vocals
- Travis Barker – drums

Additional musicians

- Roger Joseph Manning, Jr. – keyboards

Artwork

- Tim Stedman – art direction, design
- Keith Tamashiro – design
- David Goldman – photography
- Janine Lindemulder – cover model

Production

- Jerry Finn – production, mixing engineer of "The Party Song" and "Wendy Clear"
- Tom Lord-Alge – mixing engineer
- Sean O'Dwyer – recording engineer
- Darrel Harvey – assistant engineer
- John Nelson – assistant engineer
- Robert Read – assistant engineer
- Mike Fasano – drum technician
- Brian Gardner – mastering engineer

== Charts ==
=== Weekly charts ===
Chart (1999–2000)	Peak position
Australian Albums (ARIA)	4
Austrian Albums (Ö3 Austria)	6
Belgian Albums (Ultratop Flanders)	11
Canadian Albums (Billboard)	7
Dutch Albums (Album Top 100)	39
Finnish Albums (Suomen virallinen lista)	23
French Albums (SNEP)	60
German Albums (Offizielle Top 100)	18
Irish Albums (IRMA)	31
Italian Albums (FIMI)	5
New Zealand Albums (RMNZ)	2
Norwegian Albums (VG-lista)	31
Scottish Albums (Official Charts)	13
Swedish Albums (Sverigetopplistan)	23
Swiss Albums (Schweizer Hitparade)	13
UK Albums (Official Charts)	15
UK Rock & Metal Albums (Official Charts)	1
US Billboard 200	9

=== Year-end charts ===
Chart (1999)	Position
Australian Albums (ARIA)	55
US Billboard 200	45

Chart (2000)	Position
Australian Albums (ARIA)	18
Austrian Albums (Ö3 Austria)	33
Belgian Albums (Ultratop Flanders)	79
Canadian Albums (Nielsen SoundScan)	36
European Albums (Music & Media)	39
German Albums (Offizielle Top 100)	65
Italian Albums (FIMI)	16
New Zealand Albums (RMNZ)	11
Swiss Albums (Schweizer Hitparade)	56
UK Albums (OCC)	65
US Billboard 200	32

Chart (2002)	Position
Canadian Alternative Albums (Nielsen SoundScan)	124

== Certifications ==
Region	Certification	Certified units/sales
Australia (ARIA)	3× Platinum	210,000^{^}
Austria (IFPI Austria)	Gold	25,000^{*}
Canada (Music Canada)	4× Platinum	400,000^{^}
Indonesia (ASIRI)	Gold	35,000
Italy (FIMI) Units sold since 2009	Platinum	50,000^{‡}
Mexico (AMPROFON)	Gold	80,000
New Zealand (RMNZ)	2× Platinum	30,000^{^}
Philippines (PARI)	Gold	20,000^{*}
Switzerland (IFPI Switzerland)	Gold	25,000^{^}
United Kingdom (BPI)	Platinum	300,000^{^}
United States (RIAA)	5× Platinum	4,600,000
Summaries
Europe (IFPI)	Platinum	1,000,000^{*}
Worldwide (IFPI)	—	15,000,000
^{*} Sales figures based on certification alone.^{^} Shipments figures based on certification alone.^{‡} Sales+streaming figures based on certification alone.

== See also ==
- 1999 in music
