= The Mark, Tom and Travis Show Tour =

2000–01 concert tour by Blink-182

- Tour by Blink-182
- Poster for the planned Australian leg, November 2000
- Location: North America, Oceania
- Associated albums: Enema of the State; The Mark, Tom, and Travis Show (The Enema Strikes Back!)
- Start date: May 11, 2000
- End date: April 9, 2001
- Legs: 2
- No. of shows: 41
- Supporting acts: Bad Religion; Fenix TX; Bodyjar
- Box office: $7,000,000 ($10,334,961.09 in 2025 dollars)

Blink-182 concert chronology
- Loserkids Tour (1999); The Mark, Tom and Travis Show Tour (2000–01); 2001 Honda Civic Tour (2001)

The Mark, Tom and Travis Show Tour was a concert tour by the American rock band Blink-182, in support of their third studio album, Enema of the State (1999). It began in Chula Vista, California United States, on May 11, 2000, and concluded in Perth, Australia, on April 9, 2001. The tour encompassed 41 shows and visited four countries in total. The Mark, Tom, and Travis Show Tour was Blink-182's first major nationwide arena tour, marking a step up in scale from the band's earlier club and theater runs. As was typical for the band, the tour featured a mix of rapid-fire pop-punk anthems interspersed with juvenile back-and-forth banter.

The production featured an expanded arena-ready stage design with enhanced amplification and customized instruments tailored for larger venues, alongside a highly stylized visual presentation inspired by retro Americana aesthetics. The set incorporated a drive-in theater motif with a suspended screen displaying surreal and intentionally humorous film content, alongside upgraded lighting and laser effects. Musically, the setlists drew heavily from the band's early catalog, particularly Enema of the State.

Support acts included Bad Religion and Fenix TX in North America, as well as Bodyjar on the Australian and New Zealand leg of the tour. The tour was considered "one of the most anticipated rock tours of the season". Despite occasional disruptions, including the temporary substitution of drummer Travis Barker due to injury and illness, the tour was commercially successful. Critics generally responded positively to Blink-182's shows, commending their personality over strict musical precision. The tour was celebrated with live album titled The Mark, Tom and Travis Show (The Enema Strikes Back!) (2000).

== Background ==
The Mark, Tom, and Travis Show Tour was a nationwide arena run, the band's first major arena outing. Despite the scale of the 33-date tour, the group maintained the same laid-back and comedic attitude that had defined their earlier years. Guitarist and vocalist Tom DeLonge joked that the band "never rehearse[s] too much," while bassist and vocalist Mark Hoppus described the production as "the dream tour that everybody wishes they could do."

To celebrate the success of the tour, the band released a limited edition live album titled The Mark, Tom and Travis Show (The Enema Strikes Back!), which featured snippets of the band's infamous between-song dialogue. Released in November 2000, the band returned to the studio with Finn to complete a song left off the final track listing of Enema of the State: "Man Overboard." Although MTV News initially reported the album would feature recordings made "during its spring-summer tour," the album's content ended up featuring concerts from the band's 1999 Loserkids tour.

=== Stage design ===
The tour featured a larger and more ambitious stage production than the band's previous outings. Visually, the band adopted a retro 1950s-inspired aesthetic. The stage design resembled a drive-in movie theater, with a giant billboard suspended from the ceiling. The stage was designed around the rear ends of several finned 1950s automobiles, with Travis Barker's drum kit mounted atop one of the vehicles. The trunks were fitted with seating to resemble restaurant booths.

Films were projected on the screen behind the band—B-movie-style visuals featuring aliens and segments from Japanese monster movies. It also incorporated projected footage of the band in a locker room shower, alongside clips from blaxploitation films, anti-drug propaganda, and vintage softcore gay pornography, intercut with close-ups of the band performing onstage.

Lighting and production were also upgraded significantly. Hoppus enthusiastically compared the new laser effects to "those lasers that you get for eye surgery," joking that the audience's vision would be corrected while watching the band perform. Musically, the shows blended material from Blink-182's early records with a set heavy on Enema of the State. DeLonge expanded his amplifier setup to better suit arena venues and used custom Fender Stratocasters designed specifically for the tour.

=== Drummer substitution ===
During the tour, drummer Travis Barker suffered a hand injury following an altercation in Cuyahoga Falls, Ohio. According to Hoppus, Barker intervened after two men allegedly harassed his girlfriend outside a Taco Bell. Barker, who was already dealing with ongoing wrist problems and wore a brace while drumming, was temporarily unable to perform. As a result, Damon DeLaPaz of openers Fenix TX filled in on drums for several shows. DeLaPaz was already familiar with Blink-182's material from touring together and reportedly learned the setlist quickly.

The band cancelled an Australian leg on November 7, 2000 when Barker was diagnosed with a "severe case of the flu."

=== Support acts ===
Openers for the tour included Bad Religion, Fenix TX, and Bodyjar. Bad Religion was one of the band's early influences, and the group were hopeful that their inclusion would help inspire younger concertgoers to seek out more punk bands. Hoppus was effusive of their inclusion. "Watching them play every night is just a huge honor for us [...] What Bad Religion gave to us is kind of like what we are giving back to the kids of the next generation." When questioned about the decision to tour with Blink-182, Bad Religion frontman Greg Graffin said, "I was happy to be asked, because it's a great way to reach some people who've never heard punk rock, who are now willing to listen to it."

Drummer Travis Barker later revealed that the band had attempted to book Eminem for the tour before the rapper's mainstream breakthrough. Barker explained that he disliked "seeing an opening punk rock band, a middle punk rock band, and then a headliner punk band," adding that the group preferred diverse bills similar to multi-artist radio festivals.

== Reception ==
In describing the tour, Hoppus said at the time:

There's one review that said, "They played for an hour and 15 minutes, and I think 25 minutes of it was actual music." Which is about right.

The Mark, Tom and Travis Show Tour was generally well received, with critics praising the band's energetic performances and growing musical confidence, though some reviewers bemoaned its juvenile stage antics. The band's increasingly mainstream success occasionally led parents to bring young children to concerts after hearing songs such as "All the Small Things" on the radio, only to leave in disgust after encountering the group's crude stage humor and profanity. Nina Garin of MTV News observed: "While the music inspired chest-pounding and breast-flashing, it was the trio's signature stage banter that kept the hour-and-a-half show moving at full speed. They rattled off jokes about vaginas and penises. There was a short song about blow jobs and another featuring nothing but profanities."

Reviewing the tour for the Chicago Tribune, Greg Kot argued that blink-182's appeal stemmed from the members' willingness to embrace their social awkwardness and imperfections rather than adopt conventional rock-star personas. He praised the band's energetic performances, and also commended the band's decision to keep ticket prices at $15, describing it as a "punk-like gesture" that demonstrated respect for their largely teenage audience. Gavin Edwards, who interviewed the band at various stops on the tour for their August 2000 Rolling Stone cover, wrote that "In ninety entertaining minutes, the band zooms through nineteen songs […] they act just like they do offstage, only with musical instruments strapped around their torsos."

Christopher Gray of The Austin Chronicle was positive in his assumptions of the band's May 16 Austin performance, writing, "Yes, they may write songs called "Dick Lips", "Shit Piss", and "Blowjob", but still they came across as ... wholesome. Good boys. It could have been the Fifties aura of their drive-in-and-Cadillacs stage set, or perhaps DeLonge's wide-eyed glee at catching a fan's brassiere, but it was probably the songs: jet-engine blasts of adolescent heartache/bliss with more hooks than an East Texas tackle shop." Reviewing the tour for The Ithaca Journal, Victoria E. Freile wrote that blink-182's live show remained unabashedly crude and adolescent, dominated by juvenile banter, practical jokes, and audience interaction, despite the surprising depth of Enema of the State.

Jeff Spevak of the Democrat and Chronicle praised blink-182's energetic performance and blend of "nonstop chatter", "bounding riffs", and "surprising pop harmonies", but concluded that Bad Religion delivered the night's strongest set. Paul Robicheau of The Boston Globe found the band's live performance uneven, arguing that its juvenile humor had become less effective than its increasingly sophisticated songwriting. While he praised performances of newer songs such as "Adam's Song" and "What's My Age Again?", he felt the group's crude stage banter and gags often distracted from the stronger material.

The tour featured $20-$25 ticket prices and sold 80% of tickets, grossing $7 million.

== Set list ==
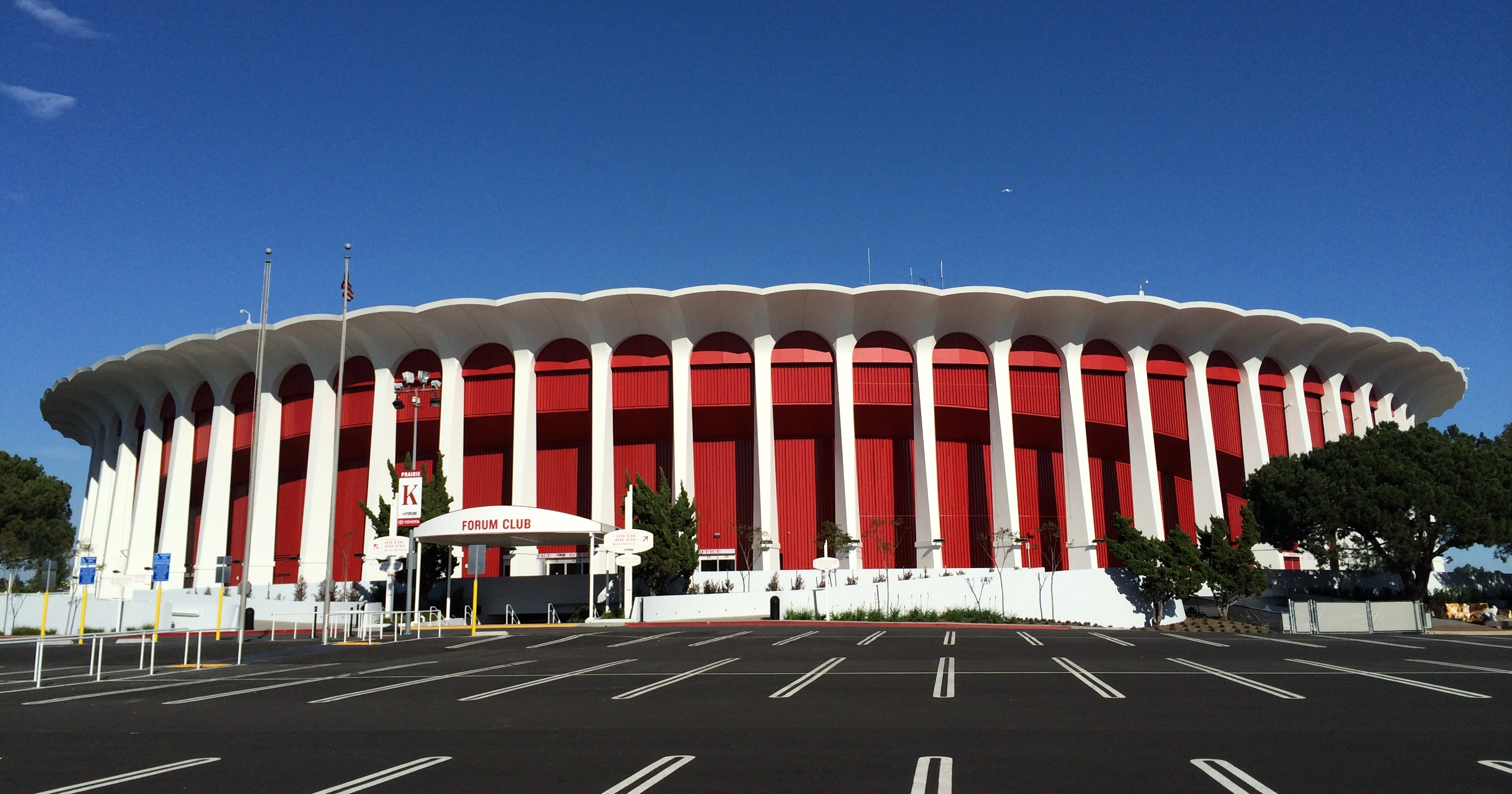
"When we sold out the Great Western Forum in Los Angeles, […] I was completely overwhelmed. I had never thought that we would do something like that, and we did." — Hoppus

1. "Dumpweed"
2. "Don't Leave Me"
3. "Aliens Exist"
4. "Family Reunion"
5. "Going Away to College"
6. "What's My Age Again?"
7. "Dick Lips"
8. "Blow Job"
9. "Untitled"
10. "Voyeur"
11. "Pathetic"
12. "Adam's Song"
13. "Peggy Sue"
14. "Wendy Clear"
15. "Carousel"

Encore

16. "All the Small Things"
17. "Mutt"
18. "The Country Song"
19. "Dammit"

Notes

- The band would sometimes alternate between humorous covers of Christina Aguilera's "Genie in a Bottle" and Sisqó's "Thong Song" during encores.

== Tour dates ==
Date	City	Country	Venue
North America
May 11, 2000	Chula Vista	United States	Coors Amphitheatre
May 12, 2000	Los Angeles	United States	Great Western Forum
May 13, 2000	Phoenix	United States	Arizona Veterans Memorial Coliseum
May 15, 2000	Dallas	United States	Starplex Amphitheatre
May 16, 2000	Austin	United States	Frank Erwin Center
May 17, 2000	The Woodlands	United States	Cynthia Woods Mitchell Pavilion
May 19, 2000	Miami	United States	Miami Arena
May 20, 2000	Tampa	United States	Tampa Ice Palace
May 21, 2000	Atlanta	United States	Lakewood Amphitheatre
May 24, 2000	Columbia	United States	Merriweather Post Pavilion
May 25, 2000	Camden	United States	Blockbuster-Sony Music Entertainment Centre
May 28, 2000	Stanhope	United States	Waterloo Village
May 29, 2000	Worcester	United States	Worcester's Centrum Centre
May 30, 2000	Wantagh	United States	Jones Beach Amphitheater
June 2, 2000	Toronto	Canada	Molson Canadian Amphitheatre
June 3, 2000	Darien	United States	Darien Lake PAC
June 4, 2000	Cuyahoga Falls	United States	Blossom Music Center
June 7, 2000	Pittsburgh	United States	Mellon Arena
June 8, 2000	Dayton	United States	Ervin J. Nutter Center
June 9, 2000	Clarkston	United States	Pine Knob Music Amphitheatre
June 10, 2000	Tinley Park	United States	New World Music Theatre
June 11, 2000	St. Paul	United States	Midway Stadium
June 15, 2000	Portland	United States	Memorial Coliseum
June 16, 2000	George	United States	The Gorge Amphitheatre
June 17, 2000	Nampa	United States	Idaho Center
June 20, 2000	Sacramento	United States	ARCO Arena
June 21, 2000	Oakland	United States	Oakland Arena
June 22, 2000	Long Beach	United States	Long Beach Arena
June 24, 2000	Las Vegas	United States	MGM Grand Garden Arena
June 25, 2000	Los Angeles	United States	Universal Amphitheatre
June 28, 2000	West Valley City	United States	E Center
June 29, 2000	Greenwood Village	United States	Fiddler's Green Amphitheatre
July 3, 2000	Kansas City	United States	Kemper Arena
July 1, 2000	St. Louis	United States	Kiel Center
July 2, 2000	Milwaukee	United States	Marcus Amphitheater
Oceania
March 31, 2001	Auckland	New Zealand	Ericsson Stadium
April 2, 2001	Brisbane	Australia	Brisbane Entertainment Centre
April 4, 2001	Sydney	Australia	Sydney Entertainment Centre
April 6, 2001	Melbourne	Australia	Rod Laver Arena
April 7, 2001	Adelaide	Australia	Adelaide Entertainment Centre
April 9, 2001	Perth	Australia	Perth Entertainment Centre
