= Aliens Exist =

Song by Blink-182

from the album Enema of the State
- Released: June 1, 1999
- Recorded: January–March 1999
- Genre: Pop-punk; skate punk; post-grunge; alternative rock
- Length: 3:13
- Label: MCA
- Songwriters: Tom DeLonge; Mark Hoppus
- Producer: Jerry Finn

"Aliens Exist" is a song by American rock band Blink-182 from the band's third studio album, Enema of the State (1999). It was written primarily by guitarist Tom DeLonge, with additional songwriting credit to bassist Mark Hoppus. The song is based on DeLonge's longtime fascination with the topic of extraterrestrials; and it invokes several references in UFO phenomena, including CIA interference and the Majestic 12.

The song was positively received upon its inclusion on Enema of the State. It was regularly performed by the band until 2002 and was returned to their setlist in 2019. Several commentators have viewed the song differently following DeLonge's continued investigation into UFOs later in life; his company To the Stars was instrumental in the 2017 release of military footage of unidentified aircraft, prompting the Pentagon to formally establish the All-domain Anomaly Resolution Office.

== Background ==
San Diego suburbanites Blink-182 rose to prominence at the turn of the millennium with their fast-paced pop-punk sound. Its members—guitarist Tom DeLonge, bassist Mark Hoppus, and drummer Travis Barker—established themselves with the release of their 1999 album Enema of the State, a multiplatinum release which includes "Aliens Exist".

DeLonge had long had a fascination with extraterrestrials and UFOs, beginning in middle school when he discovered books at a school library that piqued his interest. When touring the country in a van as a part of the mid-nineties skate-punk scene, DeLonge would keep himself occupied with books about paranormal activity. Barker recalled DeLonge staring out of his bus window in search of UFOs. When the band received their first royalty check after signing to Universal Music Group in 1996, DeLonge bought his first personal computer, which he immediately used to research alien phenomena. By the time the band gained fame, DeLonge further committed himself to his research; in one 2001 interview, DeLonge shows off his extensive collection of dozens of UFO books, as well as videocassettes containing hundreds of hours of military interviews testifying their experiences with UFOs. DeLonge's bandmates found his preoccupations amusing or gullible: "Honestly, he believes anything he reads," Hoppus sighed to Rolling Stone in 2000.

The track's songwriting credits are split between DeLonge and Hoppus, who would often debate the subject matter of the song while touring. The two would leave each other handcrafted messages on their live performance rigs with duct tape, with DeLonge most commonly saying "aliens exist," while Hoppus would reply "no they don't." Barker receives no songwriting credit, as he was considered a touring musician at this point in their career but did serve as the song's arranger, "selecting the tempos and organizing the flow of verses, choruses, and breaks."

== Composition ==
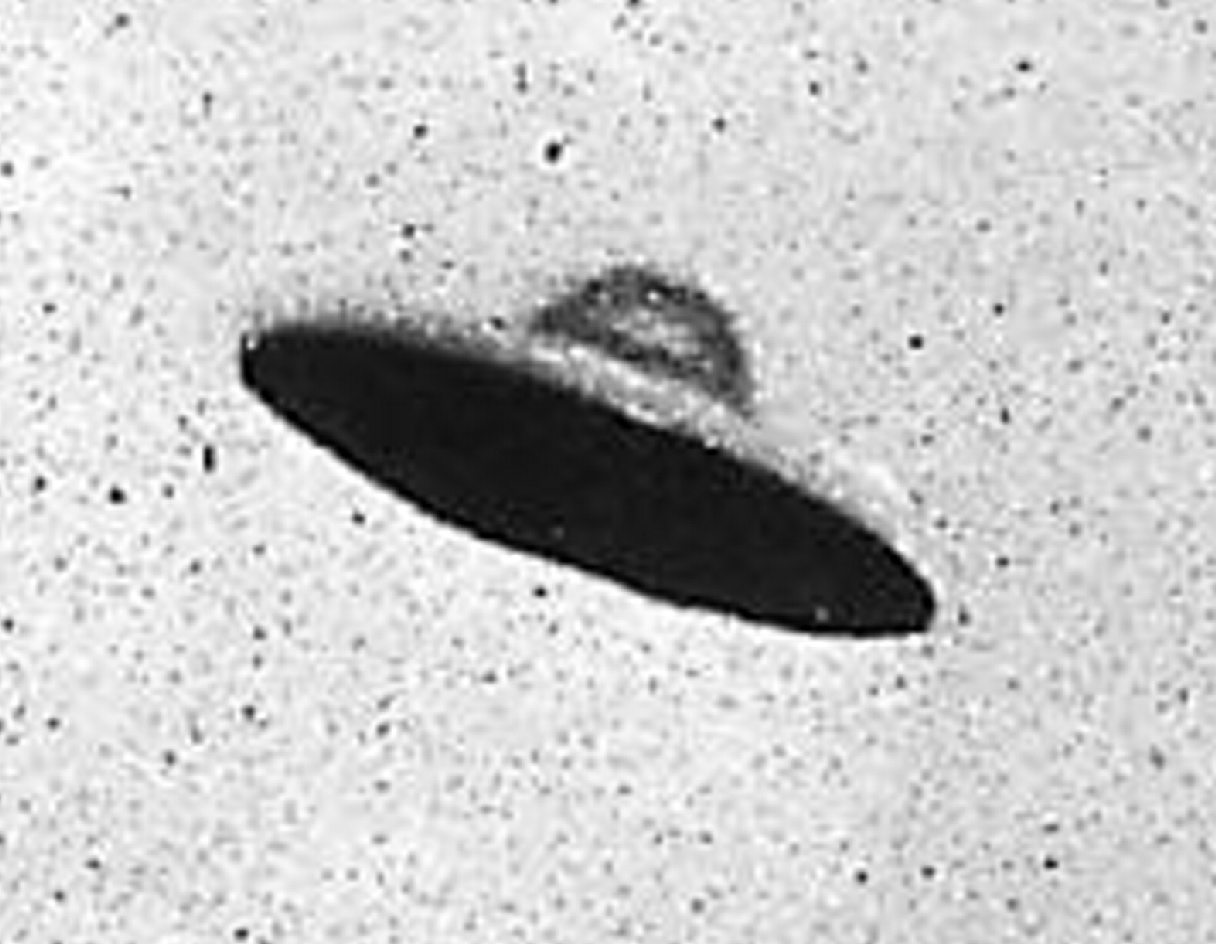
DeLonge wrote the tune about UFOs. (Pictured: Famous supposed UFO over New Jersey, 1952).

According to sheet music published at Musicnotes.com by Kobalt Music Publishing America, "Aliens Exist" is written in common time with a fast tempo of 216 beats per minute, and is set in the key of B major. DeLonge's vocal parts span from A♯_{3} to F♯_{4}.

"Aliens Exist" examines "youthful bewilderment at the universe around you," according to writer Luca Cimarusti. DeLonge uses the song's lyrics to convince listeners of the legitimacy of his claims; he facetiously acknowledges that "we all know conspiracies are dumb." DeLonge suggests the CIA has suppressed information: "I know the CIA would say/What you hear is all hearsay." The song ends with the lyric "twelve majestic lies," an allusion to the Majestic 12, a purported organization of 1940s-era government scientists studying alien spacecraft.

In a 2000 program for their arena tour, DeLonge delves into the song's subject matter:

As a hobby all I ever do is read books and study material on UFOs and government conspiracies. So I wrote a song about a guy talking about aliens as though he's had a weird experience but nobody believes him, they think he's full of shit. But he's directing his angst toward the government, because the government knows there's something going on. [...] I think it's just a cool song coming from that point of view.

== Release and reception ==
"Aliens Exist" debuted as part of a medley of songs with 30-second snippets available to stream on a2b music, an early digital music service owned by AT&T. It was officially released as a part of Enema of the State on June 1, 1999. An early review from E! Online interpreted the song as "deftly us[ing] abduction lore as a metaphor for the way adolescence at some point makes each of us feel like a creature from outer space." Houston Chronicle reporter Mike Damante ranked it among the band's best, calling it hugely "underrated", while Chris Payne at Billboard praised it for its break from "the mold of pop-punk lyrical tropes." Tolly Wright at Vulture characterized it as "fun, if unmemorable."

== Live performances ==
Though not released as a single, the group performed the track on The Tonight Show with Jay Leno in 2000. It was a staple of the band's inaugural arena tour, The Mark, Tom and Travis Show Tour, and its accompanying live album; a crude web animation made to promote the latter features aliens defecating on humans. The band later retired the song in 2002.

The band later revived the song on their 2019 tour, where they played Enema of the State in its entirety. In DeLonge's absence, Matt Skiba (who was a member from 2015 to 2022) performed in his place, and Hoppus dedicated the song to DeLonge. That same year, DeLonge himself performed the song as part of a Blink-182 medley on tour with his other band Angels & Airwaves. Following DeLonge's return, the band continued to perform the song as part of its 2023 world tour, with video screens showcasing tabloids of him and his "brush with aliens".

== Legacy ==
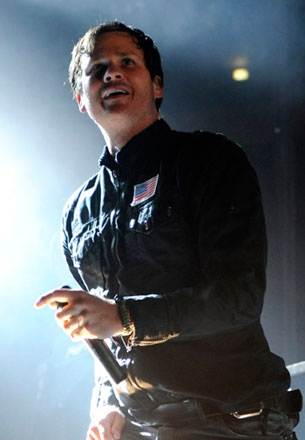
The song has been further examined in the wake of DeLonge's lifelong pursuit of UFOs.

"Aliens Exist" has been fondly remembered as a classic standout from the band's breakthrough album. The song's place has been examined within American pop culture's fascination with aliens, alongside E.T. and The X-Files. For the band's part, they embraced the image, emblazoning cartoon space aliens on T-shirts and passing out inflatable aliens at concerts. DeLonge continued to explore alien phenomena in his work with his band Angels & Airwaves, which he started in 2005; songs like "The Flight of Apollo" and "Valkyrie Missile" reference these topics. Machine Gun Kelly's 2020 single "Concert for Aliens" was considered directly evocative of the song.

The song has been frequently referenced and viewed through a different lens in the wake of DeLonge's continued investigation of UFOs, and his succession to becoming one of the country's most famous researchers. After many years of exploring the concepts through other endeavors, DeLonge co-founded a company, To the Stars, with several senior government and intelligence officials, focusing on aerospace, science, as well as entertainment. In 2017, the company released leaked footage, in partnership with the New York Times of unidentified aerial phenomena that the Pentagon later confirmed as real; these efforts were viewed as legitimizing DeLonge's longtime pursuit. This prompted the Pentagon to formally establish interest in studying UFOs.

In a feature for The Fader titled after the song, columnist Kelsey McKinney recounts DeLonge's journey from crackpot to academic:

He used to sound crazy. Here was a dude in a beanie, his left arm inked from wrist to somewhere beneath his graphic tee, best known as the former co-frontman of the rock band Blink-182. In interviews, the words coming out of his mouth made less sense than the 40 "na"s strung together in the chorus of "All the Small Things". This would have been fine — a creative mind susceptible to wild ideas is hardly unique. Except Tom DeLonge didn’t just have a passing interest or affinity; he was planning a crusade.

== Personnel ==
Adapted from Enema of the State's liner notes.

Locations

- Signature Sound, Studio West (San Diego, California)
- Mad Hatter Studios, The Bomb Factory (Los Angeles, California)
- Conway Recording Studios (Hollywood, California)
- Big Fish Studios (Encinitas, California)

Blink-182

- Mark Hoppus – bass guitar, vocals
- Tom DeLonge – guitars, vocals
- Travis Barker – drums, percussion

Production

- Jerry Finn – production
- Tom Lord-Alge – mixing engineer
- Sean O'Dwyer – recording engineer
- Darrel Harvey – assistant engineer
- John Nelson – assistant engineer
- Robert Read – assistant engineer
- Mike Fasano – drum technician
- Brian Gardner – mastering engineer
