= Going Away to College =

Song by Blink-182

from the album Enema of the State
- Released: June 1, 1999
- Recorded: February–March 1999 (Note: The band recorded Enema of the State between January and March of that year, and "Going Away to College" was developed after Valentine's Day on February 14.)
- Studio: Signature Sound, Studio West; (San Diego, California); Mad Hatter Studios, The Bomb Factory; (Los Angeles, California); Conway Recording Studios; (Hollywood, California); Big Fish Studios; (Encinitas, California)
- Genre: Pop punk; skate punk
- Length: 2:59
- Label: MCA
- Songwriters: Tom DeLonge; Mark Hoppus
- Producer: Jerry Finn

"Going Away to College" is a song by American rock band Blink-182 from their third studio album, Enema of the State (1999). Written primarily by bassist Mark Hoppus and credited jointly to Hoppus and guitarist Tom DeLonge, it was among the final tracks composed for the album and was created at producer Jerry Finn's request for a new song themed around heartbreak. Inspired by the teen film Can't Hardly Wait, Hoppus wrote it rapidly while sick at home on Valentine’s Day, framing it as a bittersweet reflection on high-school love strained by the looming separation of college. Musically, it is a fast-paced pop-punk track built on stop-start verses, a prominent hook-driven chorus, and brisk tempos.

Since its release, "Going Away to College" has earned consistent acclaim and is widely regarded as one of Blink-182’s defining deep cuts. Critics have praised its emotional clarity, melodic construction, and portrayal of adolescent insecurity and lovesickness. The track later appeared on the band's live album The Mark, Tom, and Travis Show (The Enema Strikes Back!) (2000) and has been covered by artists including Los Campesinos! and Madi Diaz.

== Background ==
Blink-182 formed in 1992 in San Diego, California. The band's principal songwriting team—guitarist Tom DeLonge and bassist Mark Hoppus—frequently wrote fast-paced, often autobiographical pop punk songs dealing with age, maturity, and most prominently, relationships. The band grew successful throughout the decade with independent albums and constant touring, attracting a following at the peak of punk rock's mainstream popularity.

"Going Away to College" was among the last songs the band developed for Enema of the State. It was written primarily by bassist Mark Hoppus, and credited to both he and guitarist Tom DeLonge. Drummer Travis Barker receives no songwriting credit, as he was considered a touring musician at this point in their career. Despite this, he served as the song's arranger, "selecting the tempos and organizing the flow of verses, choruses, and breaks." Producer Jerry Finn prepared for the sessions by attending one of the band's concerts in Las Vegas, where he polled audience members on what song topics they most enjoyed. Many concertgoers, particularly women, spoke positively about Hoppus's tunes focusing on heartbreak. Finn asked Hoppus to write another break-up song, and claimed that Hoppus returned the following day with "Going Away to College".

The song was inspired by the film Can't Hardly Wait, a teen movie that centers on a group of high school students graduating and "facing an uncertain future." The film, released the prior year, had featured Blink's music on its soundtrack. Though he had seen it twice, Hoppus viewed it a third time while at home sick on Valentine's Day 1999. The film's plot line led him to think about "how much it sucks when people are in love in high school" and are forced to be separated after graduation by different colleges in different cities. He reportedly wrote the song in ten minutes and scribbled its lyrics on a napkin. As the bulk of the album's percussion was recorded at the beginning of the process in Los Angeles, the band had to go back to record the song's drum tracks. The drums were recorded at the home studio of jazz keyboardist Chick Corea, called Mad Hatter Studios.

== Composition ==
"Going Away to College"
A sample of the song's chorus.

Built around chugging, stop-start verses and a melodic, hook-filled chorus, the song explores the concept of lovesickness. In the song, Hoppus writes from the perspective of an adolescent boyfriend, grappling with the reality that his relationship may change upon graduating from high school. He sings of skipping a lecture to watch his significant other play soccer. In one subsequent lyric, he anxiously asks, "Is my picture still hanging in her locker?" The song's chorus finds Hoppus declaring his love over a "bouquet of clumsy words / a simple melody." Altogether, Hoppus pleads with his lover to "don't forget to think about me / And I won't forget you." Randall Colburn, writing for online publication Consequence of Sound, observes that Hoppus switches between "romantic immediacy and indifference; sometimes he's singing directly to his girlfriend, and sometimes she exists only in the past tense."

Hoppus went in detail on the song's inspiration in a 2001 Penthouse piece:

The song is about the end of high school and how it's hard when all your friends are going their separate ways. The song reflects that feeling of being happy that you're getting on with your life and becoming an adult, but it also reflects the loss of innocence and the safety net of your parents, your family, and your friends.

According to sheet music published at Musicnotes.com by Kobalt Music Publishing America, "Going Away to College" is written in common time with a tempo of 210 beats per minute. Set in the key of B major, it follows the chord progression of B–B^{sus2}–B–B^{sus2} for the intro, a series of B–E_{5}–F♯_{5} in the verses, and D♯_{5}–E_{5}–B_{5}–F♯_{5} progression for the choruses. Hoppus and DeLonge's vocal parts span from A_{4} to F♯_{5}. The song boasts a "chugging, stop-start verses and hooky chorus." CNN reporter Donna Freydkin referred to it as a "bittersweet ditty about young love." Writer Jeff Yerger, for Stereogum, likened its contents to "Valentine cards you'd send to your crush, or wistful notes you'd write in someone’s yearbook."

== Reception ==
"Going Away to College" debuted as part of a medley of songs with 30-second snippets available to stream on a2b music, an early digital music service owned by AT&T. It was officially released as a part of Enema of the State on June 1, 1999. It was later licensed for use in the video game Test Drive: Off-Road 3, released later that year.

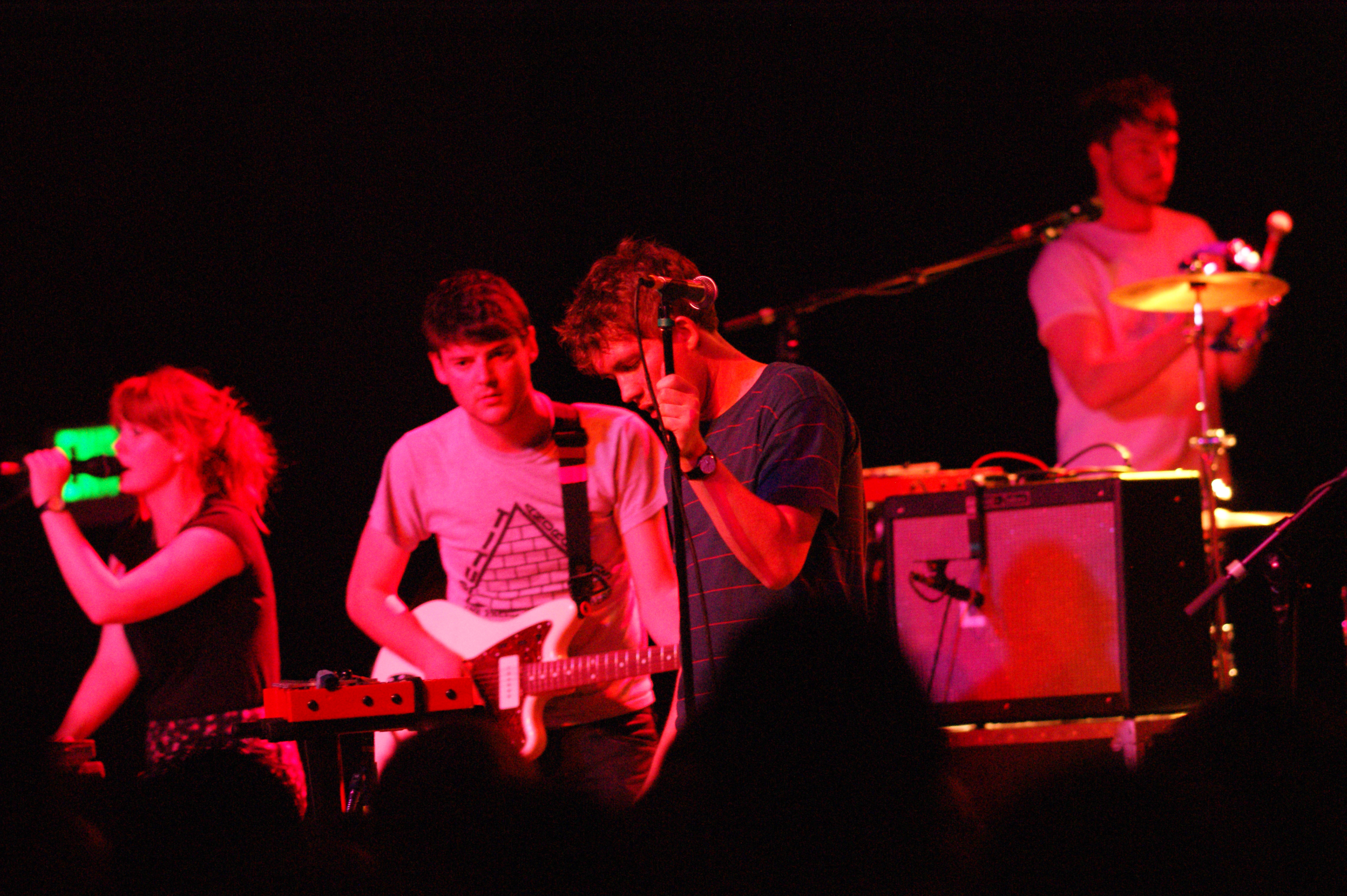
Welsh indie rock group Los Campesinos! covered the song in 2014.

"Going Away to College" has been widely acclaimed as one of blink-182's defining songs. Critics praised its emotional vulnerability and realistic portrayal of adolescent romance, frequently citing it as evidence that the band was capable of writing thoughtful, affecting love songs beneath its irreverent exterior. While the band had been portrayed as juvenile or even sexist, Jane Ganahl of the San Francisco Examiner argued that "Going Away to College" revealed a far more vulnerable perspective, portraying awkwardness, longing, and unrequited affection rather than machismo. Ann Powers, in her review for The New York Times, interpreted the track as a "portrait of the male psyche as a slapdash work in progress." Kyle McGovern of Spin selected it as among the set's "many highlights". Writing in The Plain Dealer, Anastasia Pantsios cited "Going Away to College" as an example of the album's emotional depth, describing it as "a vivid snapshot of the conflicting emotions involved in leaving a high school sweetheart after graduation."

Veteran music journalist and essayist Robert Christgau noted the band's lineage when he called it as "the love song the Descendents put Green Day on earth to inspire." An uncredited Alternative Press writer called it a "tender moment of youthful vulnerability," in contrast with the brattiness found elsewhere on the record. Consequence of Sound placed it at number two in a 2015 ranking of the band's best songs, with the writer Randall Colburn extolling it as a "perfect" summation of "puppy love": "It's the sound of two people growing apart: the widening gulf, moments of renewed connection, the eventual drift [...] that's usually how it goes in real life, right?" A Rolling Stone reader's poll placed the song at number eight on a top-ten ranking of the band's best. The staff at Billboard ranked the song as the best "deep cut" of 1999, ahead of songs by Moby and Destiny's Child, with Andrew Unterberger writing: "It’s leveling in its straightforwardness, and it’s delivered in gorgeous harmony with co-lead Tom DeLonge [...] a fucking great love song."

A live rendition of the song was included on the band's 2000 album The Mark, Tom, and Travis Show (The Enema Strikes Back!). In the recording, Hoppus substitutes the lyric "But you're so beautiful to me" with "But you're so beautiful, Skye Leigh," a reference to his wife, Skye Everly. The Welsh indie rock group Los Campesinos! covered the song in 2014 at several live shows, and in a session for satellite radio station SiriusXMU. Singer-songwriter Madi Diaz released a Bandcamp cover of the song as part of a full-album cover in 2025.

In a 2020 Nylon piece, drummer Chuck Comeau of Simple Plan singled out "College" among the pop-punk songs he wished he had written, confessing, "that song was so poignant and powerful to me."

== Personnel ==
Adapted from Enema of the State's liner notes.

Blink-182

- Mark Hoppus – bass guitar, vocals
- Tom DeLonge – guitars, vocals
- Travis Barker – drums, percussion

Production

- Jerry Finn – production
- Tom Lord-Alge – mixing engineer
- Sean O'Dwyer – recording engineer
- Darrel Harvey – assistant engineer
- John Nelson – assistant engineer
- Robert Read – assistant engineer
- Mike Fasano – drum technician
- Brian Gardner – mastering engineer
