= Mutt (Blink-182 song) =

1998 song by blink-182

Song by Blink-182

from the album Enema of the State
- Released: February 3, 1998
- Genre: Pop punk; skate punk
- Length: 3:20 (original); 3:23 (re-recorded)
- Label: MCA
- Songwriters: Tom DeLonge; Mark Hoppus; Scott Raynor
- Producer: Jerry Finn

"Mutt" is a song by American rock band Blink-182 from the band's third studio album, Enema of the State (1999). It was written primarily by guitarist Tom DeLonge, with additional songwriting credit to bassist Mark Hoppus, and drummer Scott Raynor. The song's narrative portrays a lustful couple. DeLonge penned the track for his friend, the professional surfer Benji Weatherly. The band first recorded the song for Weatherly's appearance in the 1998 surf film The Show, prior to Raynor's exit from the group.

The song was later re-recorded with drummer Travis Barker and included on the band's 1999 album, Enema of the State. This edition had a prominent placement on the soundtrack for the 1999 film American Pie; the song plays during a memorable scene in which the main character attempts to woo a foreign exchange student. A 2016 Rolling Stone reader's poll ranked "Mutt" among the trio's fans' favorite tunes.

== Background ==
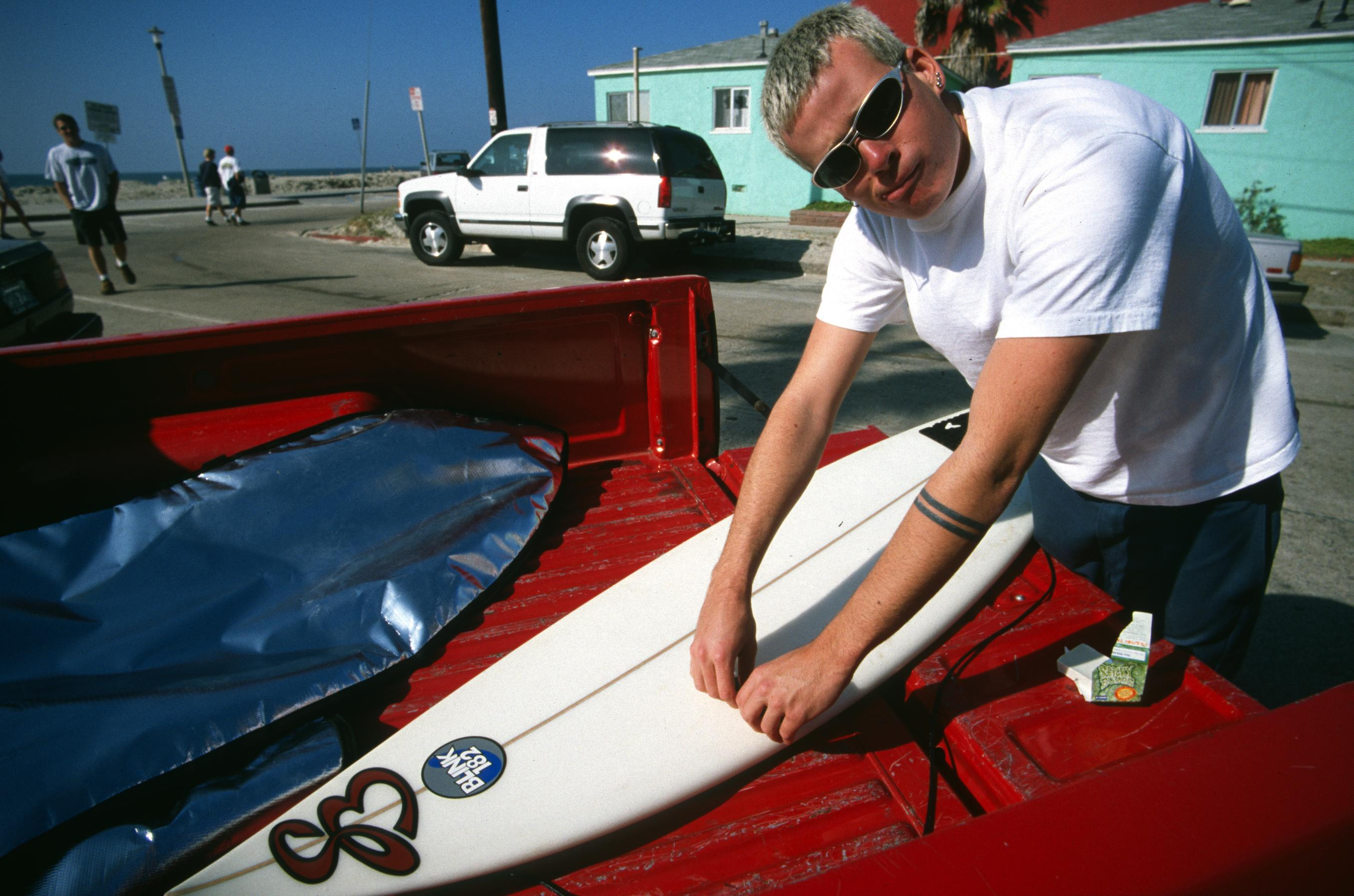
Guitarist Tom Delonge wrote the song for a surfer friend.

"Mutt" was written primarily by DeLonge about his friend and former roommate, Benji Weatherly. The two lived together in Pacific Beach, California for three years in the mid-1990s; an editorialist for Men's Journal described the duo's reputation for "wine, women, and song" as the stuff of "local lore". Weatherly was known as "Mutt" among friends, a nickname co-created by musician Jack Johnson, and his popularity among women inspired the song. "It's just a song about a guy and a girl who like to have sex and who don't really care about much of anything else," DeLonge said in 2000. The song soundtracks Weatherly's appearance in the Taylor Steele surf film The Show (1998).

"Mutt" tells the story of a popular, affluent, amorous couple. The narrator possesses a "loathsome" view of their behavior, which Billboard contributor Chris Payne describes as acting as though "they're in constant audition for a porn flick." The song opens with a drum fill, followed by a bass riff from Hoppus that alternates between the chords A_{5} and D_{5}. DeLonge begins the first verse by introducing the male character, purportedly inspired by Weatherly: "He pauses shaving and he tells himself that he is the bomb." According to sheet music published at Musicnotes.com by Kobalt Music Publishing America, "Mutt" is written in common time with a tempo of 212 beats per minute, and is set in the key of A major. DeLonge's vocal parts span from G♯_{4} to E_{5}.

== Recording and production ==
An early version of "Mutt", with original Blink percussionist Scott Raynor behind the drum kit, was recorded with producer Mark Trombino and appears on The Show's 1998 soundtrack. It was recorded at Big Fish Studios, a studio the band had previously utilized when recording their 1997 album Dude Ranch with Trombino. The session also yielded the band's holiday perennial, "I Won't Be Home for Christmas".

The band later that year re-approached "Mutt" with producer Jerry Finn and drummer Travis Barker, who replaced Raynor midway through a 1998 tour. The band had signed on to make a cameo appearance in the upcoming teen film American Pie, then in pre-production and titled East Great Falls High. DeLonge and Hoppus had read the film's screenplay and found it hilarious. The trio recruited Jerry Finn, a veteran punk producer who had worked with Green Day, to record a new version of "Mutt". They were impressed with his production and mixing work, which they viewed as "phenomenal", and hired him to produce their next album, Enema of the State. Drummer Travis Barker receives no songwriting credit, as the song was written prior to him joining the band. He later grew to dislike the song's final recording, as he was very new to the band and had yet to write a better drum part. In live versions, Barker has often changed the song's breakdown to a more hip hop-inspired beat.

== Release and reception ==
"Mutt" first appeared as part of the soundtrack for The Show, a 1998 surf film directed by Taylor Steele, and released through Theologian Records. The trio performed the song later in the year on the Australian music program Recovery, first aired May 16, 1998. The re-recorded version of the song appears as part of Enema of the State, released on June 1, 1999. Another version was also synced for placement in American Pie, released on July 9, 1999; its soundtrack features "Mutt" as well and was issued by Uptown Records on June 29, 1999. The song occurs in a memorable scene in which protagonist Jim performs an exotic dance for foreign exchange student Nadia over a webcam. Lindsey Zoladz, writing for The New York Times, called the appearance "unforgettable," remarking that it "captures the antsy, sweetly-if-somewhat-awkwardly juvenile spirit of the movie more vividly than any other song on the soundtrack."

"Mutt" played a significant role in the band's mainstream breakthrough, according to Andy Greene, writer for Rolling Stone. Billboard contributor Chris Payne considered it one of the less memorable songs on Enema. A 2016 Rolling Stone reader's poll placed the song at number nine on a top-ten ranking of the band's best.

== Personnel ==
=== Original version ===
Adapted from the liner notes for The Show.

Locations

- Recorded at Big Fish Studios (Encinitas, California)

Blink-182

- Mark Hoppus – bass guitar, vocals
- Tom DeLonge – guitars, vocals
- Scott Raynor – drums, percussion

Production

- Mark Trombino – production, recording, mixing

=== Re-recorded version ===
Adapted from Enema of the State's liner notes.

Locations

- Signature Sound, Studio West (San Diego, California)
- Mad Hatter Studios, The Bomb Factory (Los Angeles, California)
- Conway Recording Studios (Hollywood, California)
- Big Fish Studios (Encinitas, California)

Blink-182

- Mark Hoppus – bass guitar, vocals
- Tom DeLonge – guitars, vocals
- Travis Barker – drums, percussion

Production

- Jerry Finn – production
- Tom Lord-Alge – mixing engineer
- Sean O'Dwyer – recording engineer
- Darrel Harvey – assistant engineer
- John Nelson – assistant engineer
- Robert Read – assistant engineer
- Mike Fasano – drum technician
- Brian Gardner – mastering engineer
