= Fahrenheit-182 =

2025 memoir by Mark Hoppus

Fahrenheit-182: A Memoir
- First edition cover
- Author: Mark Hoppus; Dan Ozzi
- Language: English
- Genre: Autobiography; memoir
- Published: Dey Street Books
- Publication date: April 8, 2025
- Publication place: United States
- Pages: 400
- ISBN: 9780063318915

Fahrenheit-182: A Memoir is an autobiographic memoir of American songwriter-musician Mark Hoppus, co-founder of Blink-182. It was written by Hoppus and American journalist Dan Ozzi. The book was published by Dey Street Books on April 8, 2025. The book chronicles Hoppus' life and career in music. It recounts his Gen-X upbringing in the Mojave Desert, caught between skateboarding and punk rock. It bills itself as the definitive history of Blink, starting with its origins in a SoCal garage, height of fame and MTV stardom, and many breakups, including his fraught "bromance" with guitarist Tom DeLonge.

Hoppus was spurred to write the book after struggling with cancer in the early 2020s, which he covers in detail. He partnered with music journalist Dan Ozzi to write the memoir; Ozzi had previously covered part of the band's history in his 2021 tome Sellout. He and Ozzi underwent a book tour to promote the book, which received positive reviews and topped the New York Times best-seller list upon its debut.

== Background ==
Mark Hoppus is the bassist and co-founder of the pop-punk band Blink-182, which captured fame at the onset of the millennium with multiplatinum-selling albums like Enema of the State. Hoppus began writing the book after he was diagnosed with a variant of non-Hodgkin lymphoma in 2021. He was struggling with depression and anxiety in the wake of the disease, and his doctor suggested he write his thoughts down as a method of release. The book was written with Dan Ozzi, who had previously penned the book Sellout: The Major-Label Feeding Frenzy That Swept Punk, Emo, and Hardcore (2021), which happened to cover Blink-182. Ozzi called Fahrenheit an "absolute dream project. Probably the most fun I've ever had putting words together." Hoppus first revealed details of the book as he was writing it, in a 2022 interview. He found that writing the book "helped solve a lot of ongoing issues in my life, because I was trying to write it with an even hand [...] Putting it in perspective made me come to peace with a lot of anger and resentment."

The book chronicles his life in Ridgecrest as a latchkey kid, the impact of his parents' divorce, the halcyon punk days of starting the band and touring in a van, and the band's rise to fame at the peak of the record industry. It tackles the band's turmoil and behind-the-scenes drama, including their multiple breakups, many of which stem from Hoppus' relationship with Tom DeLonge, whom he calls his musical "soulmate". It also covers his hobbies, the onset of his anxiety, depression, and OCD, and describes in harrowing detail his battle with cancer. Other notable tidbits include an awkward romantic encounter with Robert Smith of The Cure, the discord between Blink and Green Day on the Pop Disaster Tour, being the victim of stalking, and a bad date with Melissa Joan Hart.

The book's title is a play on Ray Bradbury's classic sci-fi novel Fahrenheit 451. To promote the book, Hoppus filmed a tongue-in-cheek advert selling the book like an infomercial: "We'll throw in at no extra cost, anxiety, depression, band breakups, loss of self... and, of course, everyone's favorite: cancer!" Upon its release, he and Ozzi undertook a book tour, at clubs like the Wiltern in Los Angeles, and the 9:30 Club in Washington, D.C.

== Critical response ==
The book topped the New York Times best-seller list for nonfiction in the week ending April 27, 2025.

Sydney Bucksbaum of Entertainment Weekly dubbed it "raw, hilarious, and unflinchingly honest." Alexis Petridis of The Guardian characterized it as "hugely entertaining and very well written, in a wisecracking, smart-ass style – you certainly don’t want for tales of hijinks on the road – but there is a striking amount of darkness at its core." Others agreed, like Cat Woods from the Los Angeles Times, who noted "there is a patina of sadness over these anecdotes, rather than bitterness or blame-laying."

Hoppus left open the possibility of a sequel: "My publishers asked for what ideas I have for a second book, and I love writing and the process. I don't know what it would be about, maybe more stories or maybe other memories or things that didn't make the book. But yeah, I would love to write more books."
