= List of water games =

Water games are games played in a body of water, such as a swimming pool, pond, lake, or river.

Chicken fight
Two person teams: one team member sitting on the shoulders of his or her teammate or riding piggy-back. The object of the game is to knock-down or separate an opposing team through a team effort.
Marco Polo
One player is chosen as "It". This player closes their eyes so they can't see and tries to tag the other players. The player who is "It" shouts out "Marco" and the other players must respond by shouting "Polo", which "It" uses to try to acoustically locate them. If a player is tagged then that player becomes "It". If "It" suspects that a player has left the pool, they can shout "Fish out of water!" and the player who is out of the pool becomes the new "It".
Sharks and minnows
One person selected as the shark and the rest as the minnows. The shark starts in the water on one side of the pool and typically shouts: "Who wants to get eaten by a shark?", at which point the minnows may begin to dive in to swim to the opposing wall. If the shark manages to grab a minnow up to the surface, the minnow becomes a shark in the next round. After all the minnows have either reached the wall or been brought up to the surface, the shark(s) swim to the middle and the cycle starts again.
