= Orange County Drum and Percussion =

American drum manufacturer

Orange County Drum and Percussion (OCDP)
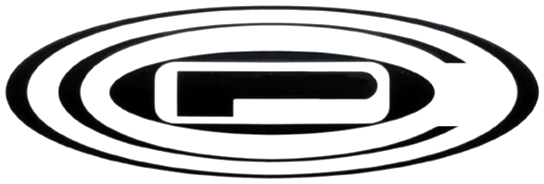
- Type: Subsidiary
- Industry: Musical instruments
- Founded: 1991; 35 years ago
- Headquarters: Anaheim, California, United States
- Products: Drum kits, snare drums
- Parent: Guitar Center
- Website: ocdrum.com

Orange County Drum and Percussion (abbreviated OCDP) is an American custom drum manufacturer located in Orange County, California. The company began as a retail drum shop and eventually started custom-building drums for several influential drummers in the 1990s, most notably Chad Sexton of 311, Travis Barker of blink-182, even releasing a custom shell pack, and Adrian Young of No Doubt, who also became a part-owner of the company. OCDP's custom drums utilized shells made by other companies such as Keller, and used exotic paint.

Since 2011, the company is owned by retail chain Guitar Center and sells ready-made drum kit sets.
