= Dumpweed =

1999 song by Blink-182

Song by Blink-182

from the album Enema of the State
- Released: June 1, 1999
- Recorded: January–March 1999
- Genre: Pop-punk
- Length: 2:23
- Label: MCA
- Songwriters: Mark Hoppus; Tom DeLonge
- Producer: Jerry Finn

"Dumpweed (Live)"

Promotional single by Blink-182

from the album The Mark, Tom and Travis Show (The Enema Strikes Back)
- Released: November 2000
- Recorded: November 4–5, 1999
- Venue: Bill Graham Civic Auditorium (San Francisco, California); Universal Amphitheatre (Universal City, California)
- Length: 2:50
- Label: MCA
- Producer: Jerry Finn

"Dumpweed" is a song by the American rock band Blink-182. It is the opening track from their third studio album, Enema of the State (1999). A live version of the song was released as a promotional single in November 2000, supporting the band's live album The Mark, Tom and Travis Show (The Enema Strikes Back). Written by band members Tom DeLonge and Mark Hoppus, the song opens the album with a fast-paced pop-punk arrangement that juxtaposes chiming verses with explosive double-time choruses, built around palm-muted guitar riffs, melodic bass lines, and Travis Barker's driving drumming. Its lyrics, centered on the refrain "I need a girl that I can train," present an immature narrator struggling to reconcile insecurity and romantic longing. "Dumpweed" was recorded between January and March 1999, and was produced by Jerry Finn.

Critics have praised it as an effective introduction to Enema of the State, citing its energetic musicianship, melodic pop hooks, and Barker's performance as establishing the album's musical and thematic blueprint. The song has also attracted critical discussion for its controversial refrain, with commentators variously interpreting it as satire of adolescent male insecurity or as reflective of the album's treatment of women. "Dumpweed" has been often used as an opener during the band's live performances.

== Background ==
"Dumpweed" was recorded between January and March 1999, while Blink-182 was working on their third studio album, Enema of the State (1999). The song was written by both guitarist Tom DeLonge and bassist Mark Hoppus, with Delonge providing lead vocals. The song originated as a collection of unrelated guitar riffs, which he considered "catchy and intricate but simple", bridged with what he felt was a "very nursery rhyme" riff to augment the verse. DeLonge, in the 2016 documentary The Pursuit of Tone, felt it was a good indication of the direction the band was heading in, and called it "probably the best [album] opener we've ever had." The song is based around the hook "I need a girl that I can train." DeLonge later framed the lyric as intentionally self-deprecating, suggesting that men are less perceptive than women and joking that "the dog is the only thing men are smarter than." In an interview with MTV News the previous year, he clarified that the line did not refer to his girlfriend: "I got a lot of shit from her for that one."

== Composition ==
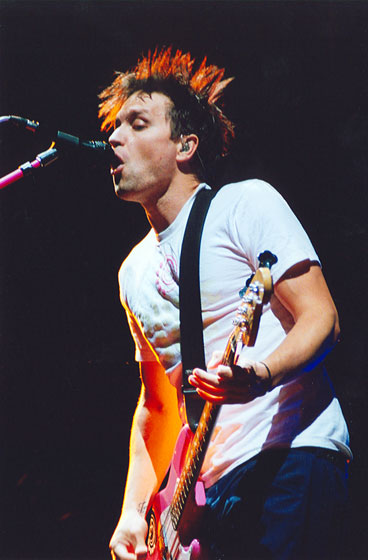
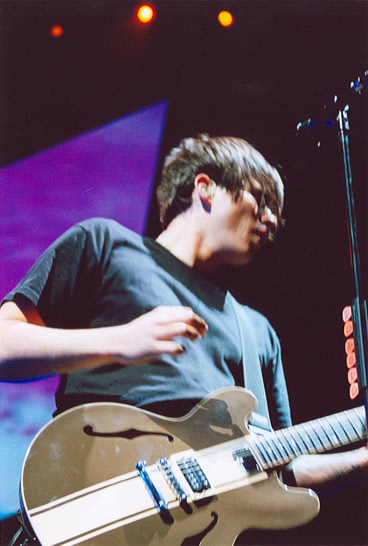
"Dumpweed" was written by both Mark Hoppus (left) and Tom Delonge (right, both pictured in 2004).

Musically, "Dumpweed" is an up-tempo pop-punk song built around palm-muted guitar riffs, melodic bass lines, driving drums, and shouted choruses, creating what the Chicago Tribune described as "jittery dynamics." The song opens with a series of distorted guitar chords before launching into a fast-paced verse. The arrangement is driven by Barker's tight snare work and fast, driving beat, which establish the song's energetic tempo from the opening measures. Barker's performance incorporates syncopated, shuffle-inspired rhythms that distinguish it from the band's earlier recordings.

"Dumpweed" establishes many of the musical and lyrical themes explored throughout the album. Lyrically, "Dumpweed" explores frustration with women. It follows an ambivalent narrator contemplating both the pain and the liberation of ending a relationship. Nitsuh Abebe of New York characterized it as "a callow complaint about girls not always doing exactly what you wish they would." Gavin Edwards of Rolling Stone described the song as being driven by an "unstoppable staccato rhythm." Journalist Joe Shooman described the song as opening with a "warm-but-crunchy" guitar figure before accelerating into a double-time chorus showcasing Barker's drumming. He also highlighted the song's comparatively complex bridge.

== Release and reception ==
Enema of the State was released on June 1, 1999, through MCA Records; "Dumpweed" is the opening track on the album, before "Don't Leave Me". It was later included on the 2000 live album The Mark, Tom, and Travis Show (The Enema Strikes Back!), with the live performance of "Dumpweed" featured on the album later being released as a promotional single in November 2000. Blink-182 have used "Dumpweed" typically as an opener at their live performances.

Robbie Woliver of The New York Times identified "Dumpweed" as one of the album's "energetic bubblegum-punk hits." Writing for The Guardian, Dom Phillips described "Dumpweed" as evidence of Blink-182 at their most effective, praising the song's dynamic shift from chiming verses to a "double-speed pile-up" of a chorus. Reviewing the live single in 2000, Michael Paoletta of Billboard described "Dumpweed" as "frantic, manic ska at its adolescent best." Stereogum's Jeff Yerger called it a "captivating opener," while Jeremy Gordon of Pitchfork described "Dumpweed" as "catchy as hell." Luca Cimarusti, writing for a blog for Riot Fest, described "Dumpweed" as a quintessential pop-punk album opener, praising the interplay between DeLonge's guitar work, Barker's drumming, and Hoppus's bass. Writing for Tidal, Dale Eisinger praised Barker's energetic performance and argued that his melodic, technically intricate approach immediately distinguished Blink-182's new lineup: "his hi-hats are almost visibly dripping sweat, finding a shuffle somewhere between ska and techno, his naked ambition transmuted to technique, the breakdowns replete with bells and toms."

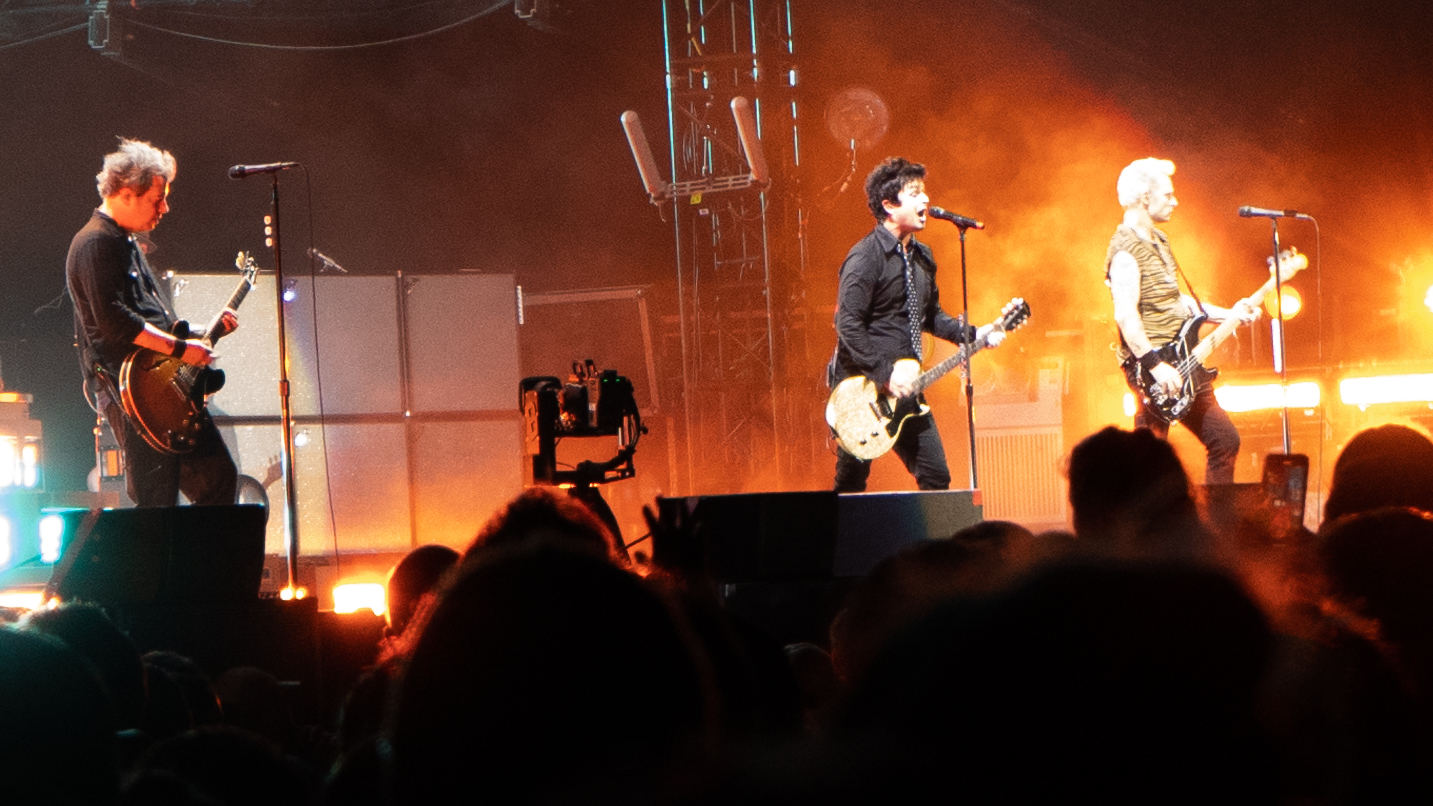
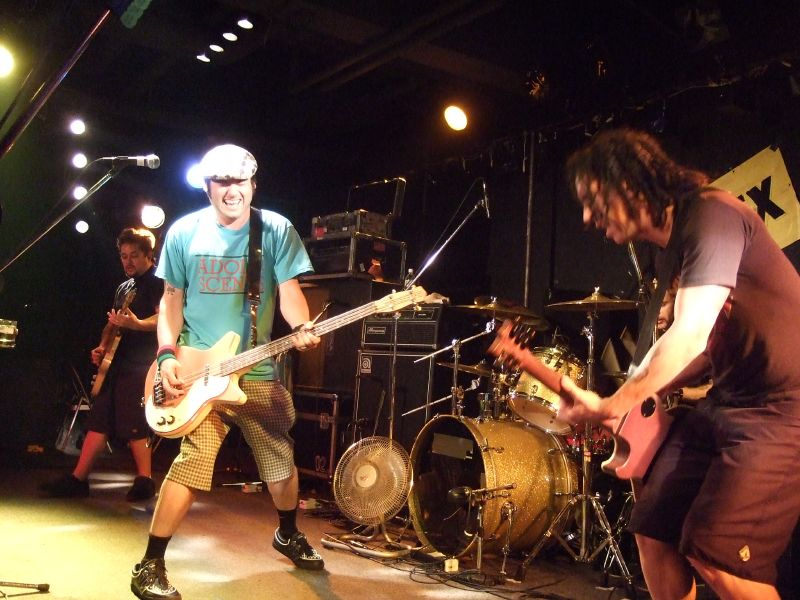
In 2025, Alternative Press placed "Dumpweed" on a list of the 5 best album openers, comparing it to those of Green Day (left) and NOFX (right).

Spin argued that songs such as "Dumpweed" demonstrated the band's ability to pair punk instrumentation with highly melodic pop hooks, contributing to Enema of the State's crossover appeal. PopMatters singled out the song's opening guitar riff as the beginning of what it considered one of Blink-182's strongest albums. In a retrospective review, Alternative Press acknowledged the song's juvenile and controversial lyrics but praised its "buoyant punk hooks," ranking it among the greatest opening tracks on a punk album in 2025, alongside Green Day's "Burnout" and NOFX's "Linoleum". Reviewing a reunion-era performance, Mischa Pearlman of The Hollywood Reporter wrote that "Dumpweed" captured the central paradox of Blink-182's music, pairing catchy melodies and humor with an underlying melancholy. Retrospective writers for Billboard have consistently described "Dumpweed" as establishing the musical and thematic template for Enema of the State. Chris Payne called it a "scintillating sample" of the album's "bubblegum angst," Jon O'Brien praised its combination of hooks, juvenile lyrics, and Barker's drumming for setting the tone for the record, while Andrew Unterberger argued that despite its controversial opening refrain, the song reflected the band's comparatively vulnerable approach to adolescent relationships amid the more overt machismo of late-1990s rock.

Critics have long differed in their interpretation of the song's controversial refrain. Writing in The New Yorker, Kelefa Sanneh characterized "Dumpweed" as an example of Blink-182's early tendency to write spiteful breakup songs in which adolescent male frustrations are directed at women, contrasting it with the band's later songs that instead turn inward and question the narrator's own shortcomings. In her contemporary review of Enema of the State, Ann Powers of The New York Times argued that while "it's a nasty idea," the remainder of the song makes "it obvious he is the one at heel." Writing for The Recording Academy, Dan Weiss similarly argued that the refrain is tempered by lyrics portraying DeLonge's narrator as fearful and emotionally immature. O'Brien also argued that the song's controversial refrain is best understood as satirizing its immature narrator rather than endorsing misogynistic attitudes. By contrast, Gordon of Pitchfork viewed the lyric as emblematic of the album's treatment of women. Kerrang!'s Sam Law argued that its exaggerated portrayal of adolescent male attitudes made it difficult to take at face value, concluding that "Dumpweed" captured the pre-millennial adolescent male mindset, portraying suburban teenage life through exaggerated machismo and melodrama.

== Legacy ==
The song's influence has also been acknowledged by later musicians. Singer-songwriter Goody Grace called it his favorite song by the band, while musician Mod Sun has cited "Dumpweed" as formative, recalling that seeing Blink-182 open with the song at the 2001 Warped Tour "solidified" his desire to pursue a career in music. All Time Low frontman Alex Gaskarth called it a "song that changed [his] life," revealing, "the second I hear it kick in I get pumped and want to kick things over." August Burns Red guitarist JB Brubaker cited "Dumpweed" as a song that reminds him of his teenage years, recalling that Enema of the State became a formative album as he was first getting into punk music.

Several artists have covered the song. Easycore outfit Four Year Strong performed a cover of the song for the tribute album A Tribute to Blink 182: Pacific Ridge Records Heroes of Pop Punk (2005). The American singer-songwriter Madi Diaz included the song in her full album cover of Enema of the State in 2025. Cameron Hurley, of We Are The In Crowd, covered the song in the style of The 1975.

== Credits and personnel ==
Credits are adapted from the liner notes of Enema of the State.

Blink-182

- Mark Hoppus – bass guitar, vocals, songwriter
- Tom DeLonge – guitars, vocals
- Travis Barker – drums, percussion, songwriter

Production

- Jerry Finn – production
- Tom Lord-Alge – mixing engineer
- Sean O'Dwyer – recording engineer
- Darrel Harvey – assistant engineer
- John Nelson – assistant engineer
- Robert Read – assistant engineer
- Mike Fasano – drum technician
- Brian Gardner – mastering engineer
