= Little people =

Little people may refer to:

- People of short stature
- People with dwarfism, short stature resulting from a medical condition
  - Little People of America, organization representing some of the above
  - Little People of Canada, organization representing some of the above
- Children
- Dutch theologian Abraham Kuyper's concept of de kleine luyden, a group of Dutch middle class orthodox reformed Christians

== Culture and media ==
- Little people (mythology), a folklore archetype
- Little People! (book), a 1991 fantasy fiction anthology
- Little People (toys), a Fisher-Price toy brand
  - Little People (TV series), a 2016–2018 animated series based on the toy brand
- The Little People (TV series), later titled The Brian Keith Show, a 1972–1974 American sitcom
- The Little People (film), a 1926 British silent film
- "The Little People" (The Twilight Zone), a 1962 television episode
- "Little People" (Dilbert), a 1999 television episode
- "Little People", song from the musical Les Misérables
- "Little People", song by t.A.T.u. from Waste Management, 2009
- "Little People", song by Todrick Hall from Straight Outta Oz, 2016
- "Little People", song by the White Stripes from The White Stripes, 1999
- The Little People, villains in the novel 1Q84

== See also ==
- Darby O'Gill and the Little People
- Li'l Folks, a comic by Charles M. Schulz
  - Little Folks, a comic strip by Tack Knight which led to the new name for Schulz's Peanuts
- Little People, Big World, an American reality television program
- Little Folks, a monthly United States children's magazine
