= Bomb Factory Studio =

American recording studio and manufacturer of music plugins

Coordinates: 34.1739°N 118.3532°W

Bomb Factory
- Type: non-profit
- Industry: software recording studio
- Founder: Erik Gavriluk
- Headquarters: Los Angeles, California
- Services: music plugins digital signal processing

Bomb Factory is a recording studio and manufacturer of music plugins based in Los Angeles, California, U.S.

== Music studio ==
Bomb Factory Studios features an extensive collection of vintage and historic equipment and musical instruments. Between 1996 and 1999, Bomb Factory was the host and benefactor involved in the restoration of dozens of instruments now part of the non-profit National Music Centre in Calgary, Alberta, Canada.

== Music plugins ==
Erik Gavriluk, the owner of Bomb Factory Studios, met Dave Amels while restoring the museum pieces. Together they decided to take their music production expertise and knowledge of vintage equipment and apply it to digital signal processing for Pro Tools by forming Bomb Factory Digital.

Key innovations included:

- Using mathematical models to emulate the original analog circuitry of real-world equipment
- Using 3D computer graphics to provide the original ergonomic usability of classic devices
- Working with original analog equipment inventors in the digital engineering process, such as synthesizer pioneer Bob Moog

In 2004, Digidesign acquired all 27 shipping Bomb Factory products. Bomb Factory retained rights to more than 30 unreleased products and associated technologies.
