= Loserkids.com =

U.S. clothing brand

- Type: E-commerce
- Industry: Streetwear
- Founded: 1999
- Headquarters: San Diego, California, United States
- Key people: Mark Hoppus, Tom DeLonge, Dylan Anderson
- Products: Clothing, accessories, skateboards

Loserkids.com was an online retail website founded in 1999 by Blink-182 members Mark Hoppus and Tom DeLonge, alongside business partner Dylan Anderson. The site operated as a skate and surf–influenced online shop, selling Blink-182 merchandise along with clothing, skateboarding gear, accessories, cosmetics, and music tied to Southern California punk culture.

== Background ==
Loserkids.com was launched in June 1999 by Blink-182 band members Mark Hoppus and Tom DeLonge alongside childhood friend and business partner Dylan Anderson, as band-run lifestyle e-commerce site during the height the dot-com era. The site functioned as a skate and lifestyle shop, selling Blink merchandise in addition to clothing, skateboarding equipment, accessories, cosmetics, and music associated with the band's fanbase and Southern California punk culture. Hoppus described the venture as part of the band's effort to establish financial stability beyond music. The website debuted coinciding with the release of Enema of the State, the band's third album.

The site was modeled after traditional skate and surf shops. Anderson stated that the goal was to provide products commonly found in those stores to fans living in areas without access to similar retail outlets. Hoppus stated that he and DeLonge created Loserkids.com in response to fan demand during tours, with the intention of making the band’s clothing, music, and skate-related merchandise available to fans outside of Southern California. The catalog included apparel brands such as Billabong and Birdhouse, as well as CDs, and other lifestyle products selected by the band and its associates.

According to public records, Loserkids.com was incorporated in California on March 18, 1999. The company remained in operation for over a decade before becoming inactive on September 11, 2014, at which point its status was listed as terminated.

== See also ==
- Loserkids Tour, Blink-182's 1999 tour
