= We Are Pirates Tour =

2016 concert tour by Blink-182

- Tour by Blink-182
- Location: Europe; North America
- Associated album: California
- Start date: May 14, 2016
- End date: July 10, 2016
- Legs: 1
- No. of shows: 18
- Supporting acts: All Time Low; Hawthorne Heights; Simple Plan; The Used

Blink-182 concert chronology
- 20th Anniversary Tour (2011–14); We Are Pirates Tour (2016); California Tour (2016–17)

The We Are Pirates Tour is a concert tour by American rock band Blink-182 in support of the group's seventh studio album, California (2016). It consisted of festival and amphitheater dates and ran between May 14 and July 10, 2016, in North America. Support acts included All Time Low, Hawthorne Heights, Simple Plan, and the Used on select dates. Aside from a few club shows and the Musink Festival in 2015, the We Are Pirates tour was their first with guitarist and vocalist Matt Skiba, and their first without founding member Tom DeLonge.

== Background ==
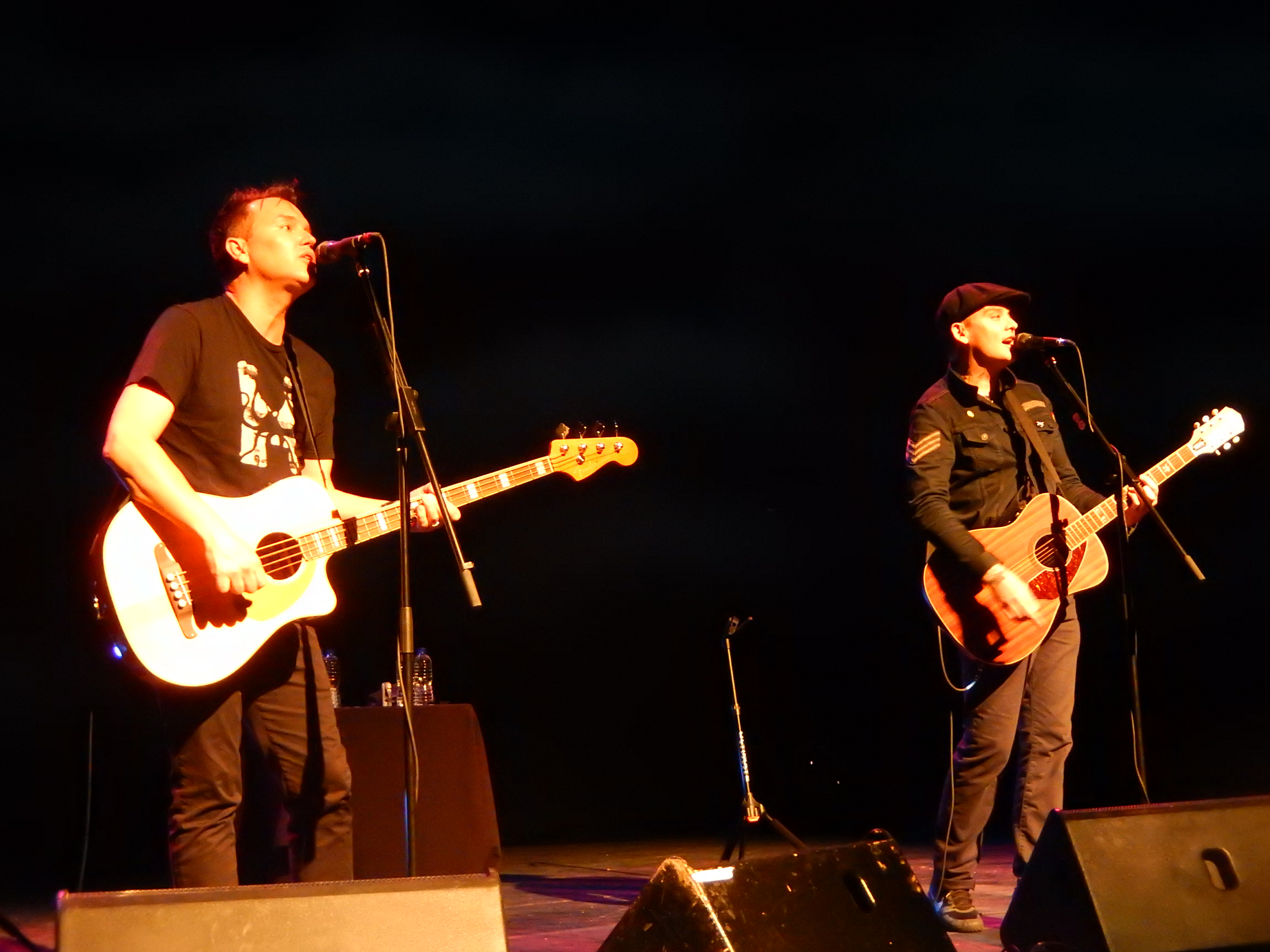
Hoppus and Skiba performing an acoustic set at the Rose Theatre in Kingston

After touring and releasing the band's sixth album Neighborhoods (2011), it became difficult for Blink-182 to record new material, due to guitarist Tom DeLonge's various projects. After disagreements, the remaining members of the group—vocalist/bassist Mark Hoppus and drummer Travis Barker—sought separation from DeLonge and recruited guitarist Matt Skiba, best known as the frontman of rock band Alkaline Trio, in his place. Blink-182 performed two club shows and a slot at the Musink Tattoo Convention & Music Festival in March 2015 with Skiba "filling in" for DeLonge. Afterwards, they regrouped and recorded the album California with producer John Feldmann.

Prior to the main headlining tour for California, the group embarked on the We Are Pirates Tour. They performed at several festivals, including X Games Austin 2016, Firefly Music Festival, Big Field Day, Amnesia Rockfest, and Kerfuffle 2016. Hoppus and Skiba also performed several acoustic sets in England in June 2016, including for BBC Radio 1's Rock All Dayer and Radio X. They added four dates in Canada in early July, supported by Simple Plan and the Used.

== Set list ==
This setlist is representative of the June 4, 2016, performance in Austin. It is not representative of all concerts for the duration of the tour.

1. "Feeling This"
2. "What's My Age Again?"
3. "Family Reunion"
4. "The Rock Show"
5. "First Date"
6. "Down"
7. "I Miss You"
8. "Up All Night"
9. "Bored to Death"
10. "Built This Pool"
11. "Dumpweed"
12. "Always"
13. "Stay Together for the Kids"
14. "Man Overboard"
15. "Violence"
16. "Josie"
17. "Happy Holidays, You Bastard"
18. "Not Now"
19. "Reckless Abandon"
20. "Carousel"

Encore

21. "All the Small Things"
22. "Brohemian Rhapsody"
23. "Dammit"

== Tour dates ==
List of 2016 concerts, showing date, city, country, venue, and support acts
Date	City	Country	Venue	Support
May 14, 2016 (Note: This concert was a part of KROQ Weenie Roast.)	Irvine	United States	Irvine Meadows Amphitheatre	—N/a
June 4, 2016 (Note: This concert was a part of X Games Austin 2016.)	Austin	United States	Austin360 Amphitheater	All Time Low
June 7, 2016	Kingston	England	Rose Theatre	—N/a
June 8, 2016 (Note: This concert was a part of Rock All Dayer. It was an acoustic set for BBC Radio 1.)	London	England	Maida Vale Studios	—N/a
June 9, 2016 (Note: This concert was an acoustic set for Radio X.)	London	England	Leicester Square	—N/a
June 12, 2016 (Note: This concert was a part of E3.)	Los Angeles	United States	LA Hangar Studios	—N/a
June 16, 2016	Southaven	United States	BankPlus Amphitheater at Snowden Grove	Hawthorne Heights
June 18, 2016 (Note: This concert was a part of Big Field Day.)	Richmond	United States	Innsbrook Pavilion	Fun Size, Ann Beretta, The Struts, KONGOS
June 19, 2016 (Note: This concert was a part of Firefly Music Festival.)	Dover	United States	The Woodlands of Dover International Speedway	—N/a
June 23, 2016	Bethlehem	United States	Sands Bethlehem Event Center	Hawthorne Heights
June 24, 2016 (Note: This concert was a part of Amnesia Rockfest.)	Montebello	Canada	Montebello Marina	—N/a
June 26, 2016 (Note: This concert was a part of Kerfuffle.)	Columbia	United States	Merriweather Post Pavilion	Bear Hands, The Strumbellas, Joywave, Violent Femmes, Cold War Kids, Silversun Pickups
June 27, 2016 (Note: This was a performance for The Late Show with Stephen Colbert. It aired on July 11, 2016.)	New York City	United States	Ed Sullivan Theater	None
July 5, 2016 (Note: This concert was a part of Summerfest.)	Milwaukee	United States	Henry Maier Festival Park	All Time Low
July 7, 2016	Winnipeg	Canada	MTS Centre	Simple Plan, The Used
July 8, 2016	Saskatoon	Canada	SaskTel Centre	The Used
July 9, 2016	Edmonton	Canada	Northlands Coliseum	The Used
July 10, 2016	Calgary	Canada	Cowboys Stampede	The Used

== Personnel ==
- Mark Hoppus – vocals, bass guitar
- Travis Barker – drums
- Matt Skiba – vocals, guitar
