= California Tour =

2016–17 concert tour by Blink-182

- Tour by Blink-182
- Promotional poster for the first US leg of the tour
- Location: Europe; North America
- Associated album: California
- Start date: July 21, 2016
- End date: September 22, 2017
- Legs: 2
- No. of shows: 119
- Supporting acts: A Day to Remember; The All-American Rejects; All Time Low; Frank Turner; The Front Bottoms; SWMRS
- Box office: $28.9 million

Blink-182 concert chronology
- We Are Pirates Tour (2016); California Tour (2016–17); Kings of the Weekend (2018)

The California Tour was a headlining concert tour by American rock band Blink-182 in support of the group's seventh studio album, California (2016). The tour began on July 21, 2016 in San Diego, California and ended on September 22, 2017, in Las Vegas, Nevada. Spanning 119 shows across 13 countries, the tour represented one of the most extensive global undertakings in the band’s career, supporting their return to active touring following a period of internal uncertainty and lineup change.

The run featured a mix of headlining dates and festival appearances across stops throughout North America and Europe. It featured a combination of arena shows, amphitheater dates, and festival appearances, including multiple international runs and return visits to both major and minor U.S. markets. In addition to its scale, the tour served as the first extensive live presentation of the Skiba-led lineup, showcasing both new material and the band’s earlier catalog. The tour incorporated large-scale production elements including pyrotechnics. Prior to the tour, the group embarked on the We Are Pirates Tour, performing at several festivals and amphitheaters between May and July 2016.

Support acts across the California tour included A Day to Remember, The All-American Rejects, All Time Low, Frank Turner, The Front Bottoms, The Naked & Famous, SWMRS, and Wavves. It also included a planned appearance at the ill-fated Fyre Festival, which was ultimately canceled before the band could perform. Reviews were generally positive, with critics praising the tightness of the performances, while also acknowledging the lineup change and noticeable shift in the group's dynamic. The California Tour grossed more than $28.9 million from its first 58 shows with a total attendance of 745,395.

== Background ==
After touring and releasing the band's sixth album Neighborhoods (2011), it became difficult for Blink-182 to record new material, due to guitarist Tom DeLonge's various projects. After disagreements, the remaining members of the group—vocalist/bassist Mark Hoppus and drummer Travis Barker—sought separation from DeLonge and recruited guitarist Matt Skiba, best known as the frontman of rock band Alkaline Trio, in his place. Blink-182 performed two club shows and a slot at the Musink Tattoo Convention & Music Festival in March 2015 with Skiba "filling in" for DeLonge. Afterwards, they regrouped and recorded the album California with producer John Feldmann.

Following the band's first performances with Skiba in 2015, Barker alluded to a potential tour with A Day to Remember, who supported the band on its three initial shows with Skiba in 2015. The tour was first announced on April 28, 2016 on Los Angeles radio station KROQ's Kevin and Bean. After the North American leg was completed, the group played some small shows in Europe, before returning to the States for festival dates in December. Following one-off shows and appearances in early 2017, the band again toured the U.S. with support acts the Naked and Famous and Wavves. A large European tour commenced in mid-2017.

The California Tour featured large-scale arena production. It centered on dynamic moving screen structures, incorporating artwork from street artists such as D*Face and Ron English, integrated into the digital scenography to reinforce a visual narrative. These layered visuals were paired with frequent pyrotechnics and sparklers, and rapid lighting shifts. The show incorporated coordinated pyrotechnics, shot from cannons placed behind the band, and sparklers throughout performances of newer material. The large high-definition video screens displayed custom visuals tailored to each song, creating a constantly shifting backdrop to the performance.

== Reception ==
Shows on the California tour were received positively. The Houston Chronicle's Joey Guerra considered it "one of the tightest shows this season." Dave Simpson of The Guardian called it a "slick, professional rock show complete with ticker tape, pyrotechnics and lots of hits."

Many reviewers contrasted Skiba with DeLonge; "Skiba barely says a word," noted The Guardian. David Greenwald from the Oregonian felt the show was missing DeLonge's "wonderfully whiny voice [and] the easy camaraderie he and Hoppus once shared." The Pittsburgh Post-Gazette's Scott Mervis wrote that "there was clearly something missing from the Blink experience. Every major band has its thing, and Blink's is being the whiny pop-punk trio with the obnoxious, profane interplay." "The new Blink feels like a whole new band altogether – not definitively better, not definitively worse, but definitively not the same," wrote Jay Cridlin of the Tampa Bay Times. A couple reviewers considered Skiba an improvement. Case Keefer of the Las Vegas Sun wrote that "the live show was noticeably improved with Skiba's soothing voice and raging effort."

Many praised Barker's drumming ability; "a truly dizzying drummer and an otherwise silent enigma," Greenwald wrote, while Simpson dubbed him "the glue holding everything together [...] a joy to watch." Among the more negative reviews came from Kevin Williams at the Chicago Tribune, who reviewed the band's Lollapalooza set. Williams commented that "This by-the-numbers set can make an eloquent argument that old punkers should just fade away ... [they] feel like a tribute band."

== Set list ==
Main set

1. "Feeling This"
2. "What's My Age Again?"
3. "Family Reunion"
4. "The Rock Show"
5. "Cynical"
6. "First Date"
7. "Down"
8. "I Miss You"
9. "Bored to Death"
10. "Built This Pool"
11. "Wishing Well" (August 9)
12. "Dumpweed"
13. "Don't Leave Me" (September 10 and September 17; with Kevin Skaff of A Day to Remember)
14. "Always" (July 21)
  "Reckless Abandon" (July 22–July 26 and August 3–August 20)
  "Up All Night" (July 28 and July 29)
  "Man Overboard" (July 30–August 2)
  "San Diego" (August 21)
  "Stay Together for the Kids" (August 23–October 1)
15. "Stay Together for the Kids" (July 21–August 20)
  "Reckless Abandon" (August 21–October 1)
16. "No Future" (July 21–July 24, August 2, and August 8)
  "The Only Thing That Matters" (July 26–July 31, August 3, August 5, August 10, August 13, and August 14)
  "San Diego" (August 6, August 9, August 12, August 14–August 20, August 23–September 28, and October 1)
  "Stay Together for the Kids" (August 21)
  "She's Out of Her Mind" (September 29–30, and 2017 Tour)
17. "Man Overboard" (July 21–July 28, September 24–September 29, and October 1)
  "Not Now" (July 29–September 22 and September 30)
18. "Violence"
19. "Dysentery Gary" (July 21–July 23 and July 26–August 10)
  "Wendy Clear" (July 24)
  "Kings of the Weekend" (August 12–August 27 and September 4–October 1)
  "Don't Leave Me" (August 28)
  "Josie" (August 30)
  "Man Overboard" (August 31)
  "M+M's" (September 2 and September 3)
  "Sober" (2017 only)
20. "Happy Holidays, You Bastard" (July 21–August 2, August 5–August 9, September 8–September 13, and September 17–October 1)
  "Man Overboard" (August 10)
  "Dysentery Gary" (August 12–September 4, September 15, and September 16)
21. "Kings of the Weekend" (July 21–August 6)
  "M+M's" (August 8)
  "Happy Holidays, You Bastard" (August 10–September 4, September 15, and September 16)
  "Dysentery Gary" (September 8–September 13 and September 17–October 1)
22. "Carousel" (July 21–August 13)
  "Los Angeles" (August 14–October 1)

Encore

1. "Los Angeles" (July 21–August 13)
  "Carousel" (August 14–October 1)
2. "All the Small Things"
3. "Brohemian Rhapsody"
4. "Dammit"

Notes

- "Blow Job" was performed after "Built This Pool" on July 31 and August 3, after "The Only Thing That Matters" on July 29, and after "Los Angeles" on August 5, August 6, and August 10. Performances of the song included the band swapping instruments (Mark Hoppus on lead guitar and vocals, Matt Skiba on drums, and Travis Barker on bass guitar).
- On August 2 after the band played "Los Angeles", Killer Mike was invited to perform a freestyle rap with the band on stage.
- On August 6 and August 8, Mark Hoppus performed a drum solo after "Dammit" to close the show.
- On September 2 in Hartford and September 4 in Saratoga Springs, Travis Barker's son Landon performed a drum solo after "Dammit" to close the show.
- On September 20 in Ridgefield, John Feldmann joined the band to sing "Brohemian Rhapsody".
- On September 29 in Irvine, Steve Aoki played a short DJ set with Travis Barker to open the encore before "Carousel". The duo performed a mashup of Aoki's remix of "Bored to Death", Aoki's song "Delirious (Boneless)", and Kid Cudi's song "Pursuit of Happiness (Nightmare)".

== Tour dates ==
List of 2016 concerts, showing date, city, country, venue, supporting acts, attendance, and gross revenue
Date	City	Country	Venue	Support	Attendance	Revenue
July 21, 2016	San Diego	United States	Viejas Arena	A Day to Remember; The All-American Rejects; DJ Spider	16,604 / 17,864	$1,007,164
July 22, 2016	San Diego	United States	Viejas Arena	A Day to Remember; The All-American Rejects; DJ Spider	16,604 / 17,864	$1,007,164
July 23, 2016	Las Vegas	United States	The Joint	A Day to Remember; The All-American Rejects; DJ Spider	8,746 / 8,746	$685,380
July 24, 2016	Las Vegas	United States	The Joint	A Day to Remember; The All-American Rejects; DJ Spider	8,746 / 8,746	$685,380
July 26, 2016	El Paso	United States	Don Haskins Center	A Day to Remember; The All-American Rejects; DJ Spider	—N/a	—N/a
July 28, 2016	Oklahoma City	United States	Chesapeake Energy Arena	A Day to Remember; The All-American Rejects; DJ Spider	—N/a	—N/a
July 29, 2016	Dallas	United States	Gexa Energy Pavilion	A Day to Remember; The All-American Rejects; DJ Spider	—N/a	—N/a
July 30, 2016	San Antonio	United States	AT&T Center	A Day to Remember; The All-American Rejects; DJ Spider	—N/a	—N/a
July 31, 2016	The Woodlands	United States	Cynthia Woods Mitchell Pavilion	A Day to Remember; The All-American Rejects; DJ Spider	—N/a	—N/a
August 2, 2016	Atlanta	United States	Lakewood Amphitheatre	A Day to Remember; The All-American Rejects; DJ Spider	—N/a	—N/a
August 3, 2016	Greenville	United States	Bon Secours Wellness Arena	A Day to Remember; The All-American Rejects; DJ Spider	—N/a	—N/a
August 5, 2016	West Palm Beach	United States	Perfect Vodka Amphitheatre	A Day to Remember; The All-American Rejects; DJ Spider	—N/a	—N/a
August 6, 2016	Tampa	United States	MidFlorida Credit Union Amphitheatre	A Day to Remember; The All-American Rejects; DJ Spider	—N/a	—N/a
August 8, 2016	Nashville	United States	Ascend Amphitheater	A Day to Remember; The All-American Rejects; DJ Spider	—N/a	—N/a
August 9, 2016	Cuyahoga Falls	United States	Blossom Music Center	A Day to Remember; The All-American Rejects; DJ Spider	—N/a	—N/a
August 10, 2016	Cincinnati	United States	Riverbend Music Center	A Day to Remember; The All-American Rejects; DJ Spider	—N/a	—N/a
August 12, 2016	Camden	United States	BB&T Pavilion	A Day to Remember, All Time Low, DJ Spider	—N/a	—N/a
August 13, 2016	Wantagh	United States	Nikon at Jones Beach Theater	A Day to Remember, All Time Low, DJ Spider	—N/a	—N/a
August 14, 2016	Holmdel	United States	PNC Bank Arts Center	A Day to Remember, All Time Low, DJ Spider	—N/a	—N/a
August 16, 2016	Virginia Beach	United States	Veterans United Home Loans Amphitheater	A Day to Remember, All Time Low, DJ Spider	—N/a	—N/a
August 17, 2016	Brooklyn	United States	Barclays Center	A Day to Remember, All Time Low, DJ Spider	—N/a	—N/a
August 19, 2016	Mansfield	United States	XFINITY Center	A Day to Remember, All Time Low, DJ Spider	—N/a	—N/a
August 20, 2016	Montreal	Canada	Bell Centre	A Day to Remember, All Time Low, DJ Spider	7,435 / 8,645	$393,525
August 21, 2016	Toronto	Canada	Molson Canadian Amphitheatre	A Day to Remember, All Time Low, DJ Spider	—N/a	—N/a
August 23, 2016	Syracuse	United States	Lakeview Amphitheater	A Day to Remember, All Time Low, DJ Spider	—N/a	—N/a
August 24, 2016	Darien	United States	Darien Lake Performing Arts Center	A Day to Remember, All Time Low, DJ Spider	—N/a	—N/a
August 25, 2016	Scranton	United States	The Pavilion at Montage Mountain	A Day to Remember, All Time Low, DJ Spider	—N/a	—N/a
August 27, 2016	Hershey	United States	Star Pavilion	A Day to Remember, All Time Low, DJ Spider	—N/a	—N/a
August 28, 2016	Burrgettstown	United States	First Niagara Pavilion	A Day to Remember, All Time Low, DJ Spider	—N/a	—N/a
August 30, 2016	Clarkston	United States	DTE Energy Music Theatre	A Day to Remember, All Time Low, DJ Spider	—N/a	—N/a
August 31, 2016	Grand Rapids	United States	Van Andel Arena	A Day to Remember, All Time Low, DJ Spider	9,492 / 10,201	$538,927
September 2, 2016	Hartford	United States	Xfinity Theatre	A Day to Remember, All Time Low, DJ Spider	—N/a	—N/a
September 3, 2016	Bangor	United States	Darling's Waterfront Pavilion	A Day to Remember, All Time Low, DJ Spider	—N/a	—N/a
September 4, 2016	Saratoga Springs	United States	Saratoga Performing Arts Center	A Day to Remember, All Time Low, DJ Spider	—N/a	—N/a
September 8, 2016	Saint Paul	United States	Xcel Energy Center	A Day to Remember; The All-American Rejects; DJ Spider	—N/a	—N/a
September 9, 2016	Tinley Park	United States	Hollywood Casino Amphitheatre	A Day to Remember; The All-American Rejects; DJ Spider	—N/a	—N/a
September 10, 2016	Noblesville	United States	Klipsch Music Center	A Day to Remember; The All-American Rejects; DJ Spider	—N/a	—N/a
September 11, 2016	Maryland Heights	United States	Hollywood Casino Amphitheatre	A Day to Remember; The All-American Rejects; DJ Spider	—N/a	—N/a
September 13, 2016	Denver	United States	Pepsi Center	A Day to Remember; The All-American Rejects; DJ Spider	—N/a	—N/a
September 15, 2016	Boise	United States	Taco Bell Arena	A Day to Remember; The All-American Rejects; DJ Spider	—N/a	—N/a
September 16, 2016	Spokane	United States	Spokane Arena	A Day to Remember; The All-American Rejects; DJ Spider	—N/a	—N/a
September 17, 2016	Seattle	United States	KeyArena	A Day to Remember; The All-American Rejects; DJ Spider	12,987 / 13,376	$606,445
September 18, 2016	Vancouver	Canada	Abbotsford Centre	A Day to Remember; The All-American Rejects; DJ Spider	—N/a	—N/a
September 20, 2016	Ridgefield	United States	Sunlight Supply Amphitheater	A Day to Remember; The All-American Rejects; DJ Spider	—N/a	—N/a
September 22, 2016	West Valley City	United States	USANA Amphitheatre	A Day to Remember; All Time Low; DJ Spider	18,949 / 20,000	$429,280
September 24, 2016	Phoenix	United States	Ak-Chin Pavilion	A Day to Remember; All Time Low; DJ Spider	18,135 / 19,346	$600,794
September 25, 2016	Albuquerque	United States	Isleta Amphitheater	A Day to Remember; All Time Low; DJ Spider	—N/a	—N/a
September 28, 2016	Mountain View	United States	Shoreline Amphitheater	A Day to Remember; All Time Low; DJ Spider	—N/a	—N/a
September 29, 2016	Irvine	United States	Irvine Meadows Amphitheatre	A Day to Remember; All Time Low; DJ Spider	—N/a	—N/a
September 30, 2016	Inglewood	United States	The Forum	A Day to Remember; All Time Low; DJ Spider	26,058 / 26,058	$1,409,804
October 1, 2016	Inglewood	United States	The Forum	A Day to Remember; All Time Low; DJ Spider	26,058 / 26,058	$1,409,804
October 5, 2016	Santa Barbara	United States	Santa Barbara Bowl	A Day to Remember; All Time Low; DJ Spider	—N/a	—N/a
October 6, 2016	Fresno	United States	Save Mart Center	A Day to Remember; All Time Low; DJ Spider	9,339 / 10,562	$465,640
October 7, 2016	Irvine	United States	Irvine Meadows Amphitheatre	A Day to Remember; All Time Low; DJ Spider	—N/a	—N/a
November 7, 2016 (Note: This concert was an acoustic set for Kerrang! Radio.)	London	England	One Golden Square	—N/a	—N/a	—N/a
November 7, 2016 (Note: This concert was an acoustic set for Absolute Radio. It aired November 10, 2016.)	London	England	One Golden Square	—N/a	—N/a	—N/a
November 8, 2016 (Note: This concert was an acoustic set for Maison de la Radio.)	Paris	France	Studio 104	—N/a	—N/a	—N/a
November 9, 2016 (Note: This concert was an acoustic set for Ouï FM.)	Paris	France	Ouï FM Studios	—N/a	—N/a	—N/a
November 10, 2016	Stockholm	Sweden	Bandit Radio	—N/a	—N/a	—N/a
November 11, 2016	Stockholm	Sweden	Bryggarsalen	—N/a	—N/a	—N/a
December 8, 2016 (Note: This concert was a part of Holiday Havoc.)	Las Vegas	United States	Pearl Theatre	—N/a	—N/a	—N/a
December 9, 2016 (Note: This concert was a part of Not So Silent Night.)	Oakland	United States	Oracle Arena	—N/a	—N/a	—N/a
December 10, 2016 (Note: This concert was a part of Wrex the Halls.)	San Diego	United States	Valley View Casino Center	—N/a	—N/a	—N/a
December 11, 2016 (Note: This concert was a part of KROQ's Almost Acoustic Christmas.)	Inglewood	United States	The Forum	—N/a	—N/a	—N/a

List of 2017 concerts, showing date, city, country, venue, supporting acts, attendance, and gross revenue
Date	City	Country	Venue	Support	Attendance	Revenue
January 4, 2017 (Note: This was a concert for the 2017 AT&T Developer Summit.)	Las Vegas	United States	Palms Casino Resort	—N/a	—N/a	—N/a
January 5, 2017	Las Vegas	United States	Brooklyn Bowl	—N/a	—N/a	—N/a
January 10, 2017 (Note: This was a performance for Jimmy Kimmel Live!.)	Hollywood	United States	Hollywood Masonic Temple	—N/a	—N/a	—N/a
January 30, 2017 (Note: This concert was a part of the NHL All-Star Party 2017.)	Los Angeles	United States	Staples Center	—N/a	—N/a	—N/a
February 4, 2017 (Note: This concert was a part of the Phoenix Open.)	Phoenix	United States	Coors Light Birds Nest	—N/a	—N/a	—N/a
March 22, 2017	Austin	United States	Austin360 Amphitheater	The Naked and Famous	—	—
March 23, 2017 (Note: This concert was a part of the 2017 RodeoHouston.)	Houston	United States	NRG Stadium	The Naked and Famous	65,011 / 71,795	—N/a
March 25, 2017	Las Cruces	United States	Pan American Center	The Naked and Famous	—	—
March 26, 2017 (Note: This concert was a part of the 2017 KFMA Day Music Festival.)	Tucson	United States	Kino Stadium	The Naked and Famous	—N/a	—N/a
March 28, 2017	Lubbock	United States	Lonestar Amphitheater	The Naked and Famous	—	—
March 30, 2017	Independence	United States	Silverstein Eye Centers Arena	The Naked and Famous	—	—
March 31, 2017	North Little Rock	United States	Verizon Arena	The Naked and Famous	—	—
April 1, 2017 (Note: This concert was a part of the 2017 Edgefest.)	Frisco	United States	Toyota Stadium	—N/a	—N/a	—N/a
April 2, 2017	Phoenix	United States	Margaret T. Hance Park	—N/a	—N/a	—N/a
April 19, 2017	Flagstaff	United States	Northern Arizona University	The Naked and Famous; Wavves	—N/a	—N/a
April 21, 2017	Amarillo	United States	Aztec Music Hall	The Naked and Famous; Wavves	—	—
April 22, 2017	Rogers	United States	Walmart Arkansas Music Pavilion	The Naked and Famous; Wavves	—	—
April 23, 2017	Springfield	United States	Abou Ben Adhem Shrine Mosque	The Naked and Famous; Wavves	—	—
April 25, 2017	Pelham	United States	Oak Mountain Amphitheatre	The Naked and Famous; Wavves	—	—
April 26, 2017	North Charleston	United States	North Charleston Coliseum	The Naked and Famous; Wavves	—	—
May 2, 2017	Pensacola	United States	Pensacola Bay Center	The Naked and Famous; Wavves	—	—
May 3, 2017	Tallahassee	United States	The Pavilion	The Naked and Famous; Wavves	—	—
May 4, 2017	Orlando	United States	Orlando Fairgrounds	The Naked and Famous; Wavves	—	—
May 7, 2017 (Note: This concert was a part of SunFest.)	West Palm Beach	United States	West Palm Beach Arts and Entertainment District	Wavves	—N/a	—N/a
May 9, 2017	New Orleans	United States	UNO Lakefront Arena	The Naked and Famous; Wavves	3,593 / 5,400	$195,739
June 9, 2017 (Note: This concert was a part of the Download Festival.)	Paris	France	Hippodrome de Longchamp	—	—	—
June 12, 2017	Frankfurt	Germany	Festhalle	A Day to Remember	—	—
June 13, 2017	Oberhausen	Germany	König Pilsener Arena	A Day to Remember	—	—
June 15, 2017 (Note: This concert was a part of the Nova Rock Festival.)	Nickelsdorf	Austria	Pannonia Fields	—	—	—
June 16, 2017	Munich	Germany	Olympiahalle	A Day to Remember	—	—
June 17, 2017 (Note: This concert was a part of the I-Days Festival.)	Monza	Italy	Autodromo Nazionale Monza	—	—	—
June 24, 2017 (Note: This concert was a part of the Hurricane Festival.)	Scheeßel	Germany	Eichenring	—	—	—
June 25, 2017 (Note: This concert was a part of the Southside Festival.)	Neuhausen ob Eck	Germany	Neuhausen ob Eck Airfield	—	—	—
June 26, 2017	Rotterdam	Netherlands	Rotterdam Ahoy	A Day to Remember; SWMRS	—	—
June 29, 2017	Berlin	Germany	Max-Schmeling-Halle	A Day to Remember; SWMRS	—	—
July 1, 2017 (Note: This concert was a part of Rock Werchter.)	Werchter	Belgium	3118 Werchter	—	—	—
July 3, 2017	Cardiff	Wales	Motorpoint Arena Cardiff	Frank Turner and the Sleeping Souls; The Front Bottoms	—	—
July 4, 2017	Nottingham	England	Motorpoint Arena Nottingham	Frank Turner and the Sleeping Souls; The Front Bottoms	—	—
July 5, 2017	Leeds	England	First Direct Arena	Frank Turner and the Sleeping Souls; The Front Bottoms	—	—
July 7, 2017	Birmingham	England	Barclaycard Arena	Frank Turner and the Sleeping Souls; The Front Bottoms	—	—
July 9, 2017	Newcastle	England	Metro Radio Arena	Frank Turner and the Sleeping Souls; The Front Bottoms	—	—
July 11, 2017	Glasgow	Scotland	SSE Hydro	Frank Turner and the Sleeping Souls; The Front Bottoms	—	—
July 12, 2017	Aberdeen	Scotland	GE Oil & Gas Arena	Frank Turner and the Sleeping Souls; The Front Bottoms	—	—
July 14, 2017 (Note: This concert was originally scheduled to be held at Manchester Arena, but was relocated due to the venue being temporarily closed after the Manchester Arena bombing.)	Manchester	England	Castlefield Bowl	Frank Turner and the Sleeping Souls; The Front Bottoms	—	—
July 15, 2017	Liverpool	England	Echo Arena	Frank Turner and the Sleeping Souls; The Front Bottoms	—	—
July 19, 2017	London	England	The O_{2} Arena	Frank Turner and the Sleeping Souls; The Front Bottoms	—	—
July 20, 2017	London	England	The O_{2} Arena	Frank Turner and the Sleeping Souls; The Front Bottoms	—	—
July 31, 2017	Lewiston	United States	Artpark	PVRIS	—N/a	—N/a
August 1, 2017	Columbus	United States	Express Live!	Four Year Strong	—N/a	—N/a
August 3, 2017 (Note: This concert was a part of Lollapalooza 2017.)	Chicago	United States	Grant Park	—N/a	—N/a	—N/a
August 3, 2017	Chicago	United States	Metro	—N/a	—N/a	—N/a
August 9, 2017	Prior Lake	United States	Mystic Amphitheater at Mystic Lake Casino	—N/a	—N/a	—N/a
August 10, 2017 (Note: This concert was a part of Sturgis Buffalo Chip August Music Festival.)	Sturgis	United States	Buffalo Chip Campground	—N/a	—N/a	—N/a
August 24, 2017 (Note: This concert was a part of City of Trees 2017.)	Sacramento	United States	Papa Murphy's Park	—N/a	—N/a	—N/a
September 16, 2017 (Note: This concert was a part of Music Midtown.)	Atlanta	United States	Piedmont Park	—N/a	—N/a	—N/a
September 19, 2017	Tulsa	United States	Brady Theater	—N/a	—N/a	—N/a
September 22, 2017 (Note: This concert was a part of Life is Beautiful 2017.)	Las Vegas	United States	Downtown Las Vegas	—N/a	—N/a	—N/a
Total					—	—

=== Canceled dates ===
List of canceled concerts, showing date, city, country, venue and reason for cancellation
Date	City	Country	Venue	Reason
September 5, 2016	Atlantic City	United States	Atlantic City Beach	Hurricane Hermine
April 28, 2017 (Note: This concert was set to be a part of the Fyre Festival. The band cancelled their show one day before they were set to perform, with a statement that read in part, "We're not confident that we would have what we need to give you the quality of performances we always give fans." The festival experienced problems related to security, food, accommodations and artist relations, and was indefinitely postponed shortly thereafter.)	Exuma	The Bahamas	—N/a	Quality management
June 21, 2017	Stockholm	Sweden	Gröna Lund	Limited traveling ability
June 22, 2017 (Note: This concert was set to be a part of the Tons of Rock Festival.)	Halden	Norway	Fredriksten	Limited traveling ability
June 28, 2017 (Note: This concert was set to be a part of the Roskilde Festival.)	Roskilde	Denmark	Darupvej 19 DK-4000	Limited traveling ability
July 17, 2017	Bournemouth	England	Bournemouth International Centre	Illness
July 28, 2017	New York City	United States	Citi Field	Death of Chester Bennington
July 30, 2017	Hershey	United States	Hersheypark Stadium	Death of Chester Bennington
September 13, 2017	Knoxville	United States	Knoxville Civic Coliseum	N/A
September 14, 2017	New Braunfels	United States	Whitewater Amphitheater	N/A
