= The Kinison =

American rock band

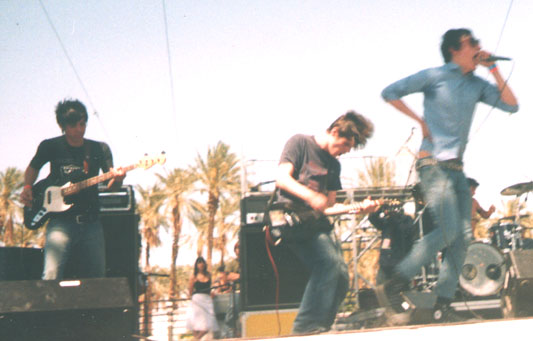

Background information
- Origin: Oblong, Illinois, United States
- Genres: Post-hardcore, indie rock, alternative rock, punk rock
- Years active: 1999–2005; 2013–2014; 2026–present
- Labels: Fearless; LaSalle; Highwires
- Past members: Christopher Lee Lewis; Aaron James Faller; Guy Bub Knight; Tim Milhouse; Mikey Rivera; Frank Figueroa; Mike V Rico Jones; Luke Highshoe; Andrew Hull

The Kinison is a rock band formed in Oblong, Illinois, in 1999. The band is named after American comedian Sam Kinison.

== History ==
In late January 2002, the band headed to California in search of a new bass player and drummer. Initially, they hired bass player Tim Milhouse and drummer Mikey Rivera, both friends of their then manager Bill Fold. When Tim Milhouse left the band, they recruited bassist Frank Figueroa from a band called 401 Waterman. Frank played bass on the band's debut EP, Mortgage is Bank. Soon after recording, Frank quit The Kinison to find work as a registered nurse. The trio soon recruited Mike V and Mikey to complete the band.

After 9 months of playing tiny shows in the Inland Empire and Los Angeles area, they landed a spot on the indie rock festival This Ain't No Picnic. The band recorded an EP Mortgage Is Bank in September 2002 for Fearless Records. In 2003 The Kinison played at Coachella, a two-day music festival in Indio, California. In late 2004, they were one of the support acts for Blink-182 on their DollaBill Tour.

After months of touring, the band signed a record deal with Travis Barker's LaSalle Records; the full-length album, What Are You Listening To? was LaSalle's debut record. It was recorded in 15 days and produced by Pelle Hendricsson and Eskil Lovestrom (Refused, Poison The Well, Hell is for Heroes).

The Kinison broke up in 2005, but reformed in 2013, releasing an EP entitled Oh, the Guilt.

== Members ==
- Christopher Lee Lewis - vocals
- Aaron James Faller - lead guitar
- Guy Bub Knight - guitar
- Tim Milhouse - bass
- Frank Alexander Figueroa - bass
- Mikey Rivera - drums
- Ali Jinnah Kamasitara - Keyboardist (temporary)
- Kimoshi Yamashita - Technician
- Mike V - bass

== Discography ==
- Mortgage Is Bank (2003), Fearless Records
- What Are You Listening To? (2004), LaSalle Records
- Oh, the Guilt (2013), Highwires
