= DollaBill Tour =

2003 concert tour by Blink-182

- Tour by Blink-182
- Promotional poster for the tour
- Location: North America
- Associated album: Blink-182
- Start date: November 6, 2003
- End date: November 21, 2003
- No. of shows: 10
- Supporting acts: Bubba Sparxxx; The Kinison

Blink-182 concert chronology
- Pop Disaster Tour (2002); DollaBill Tour (2003); Blink-182 Tour (2003–04)

The DollaBill Tour was a mini-concert tour by rock band Blink-182. Running for ten dates across North America, the tour marked a deliberate return to small club venues after several years of arena and amphitheater touring. Tickets were sold for one dollar—a symbolic gesture intended to reconnect with longtime fans and recreate the intimacy of the band's early years. Rapper Bubba Sparxxx and post-hardcore band the Kinison served as opening acts.

The tour marked the beginning of the band's promotional campaign for Blink-182, their untitled fifth studio album, which was released during the outing. Originally conceived as a free tour, organizers ultimately charged a nominal admission fee for logistical and safety reasons, with the band largely absorbing the tour's costs themselves. Reviews were generally positive, with critics praising blink-182's stronger musicianship and the balance between the band's familiar humor and the more mature songwriting of its untitled album.

== Background ==
The tour was conceived as a low-cost, fan-focused experience intended to reward long-time supporters who had helped the band reach mainstream success. The band covered the tour's expenses themselves, while many venues donated use of their spaces for free for the performances. It was originally planned as a free tour, but it was ultimately decided that a one-dollar ticket price would be necessary for logistical and safety reasons. "We wanted to remind ourselves where we came from and our fans, too," DeLonge said. "Small shows can be so much more powerful. They are ten times more intimate. For a normal fan that likes stuff on the radio they might want pyro and lights, but for a music lover and fan of the band they will feel it and don’t need the glamour." Drummer Travis Barker agreed, stating that he preferred intimate club performances over large arena shows.

Due to strong demand, blink-182 added a second all-ages show in Toronto to the tour's DollaBill itinerary. In a later interview with the British press, Tom DeLonge joked that the DollaBill Tour was only intended to provide "$1 worth of songs"; he stated that although Blink-182 had considered bringing the concept to the United Kingdom, the stronger value of the British pound would have made the shows financially impractical.

=== Support acts ===
Rapper Bubba Sparxxx and post-hardcore band the Kinison supported the group on tour dates. Barker, who was responsible for recruiting the two acts, praised the contrast between them, observing the variety helped distinguish the tour from others within the punk rock scene. He expressed particular enthusiasm for Sparxxx, praising his producer Timbaland and the musical depth of Sparxxx's work. Barker called Sparxxx "one of my favorite rappers of all time." In describing the decision to feature eclectic supporting acts, Barker remarked, "We tour with punk rock bands every time we tour, so we’re just going to tour with bands we like now." DeLonge was similar:

People gotta grow. They gotta open their minds and listen. There is a lot of good music out there and it’s like, since I was in 7th grade, I only listened to punk rock. I was so biased, so stupid. Now there’s so many great bands out there and it wasn’t until our band started having a little success that I see these bands out there doing their shit and it’s amazing.

== Reception ==
Joshua Klein of the Chicago Tribune described blink-182's performance as "a filler-free thrill," praising the band's musical maturity, stronger songwriting, and Barker's drumming, while noting that DeLonge's guitar work sometimes became repetitive. Ben Rayner of the Toronto Star praised the DollaBill Tour for striking a balance between blink-182's familiar humor and the more introspective songwriting of its untitled album, concluding that the band had learned to take itself "maybe just a little more seriously" without losing its identity. Sarah Tomlinson of The Boston Globe praised blink-182's performance on the opening night of the outing, noting that while longtime fans responded most enthusiastically to the band's earlier hits, the newer material ultimately won over the audience.

Andrew Bealuon of Spin remained largely neutral in a review of the band's set at the 9:30 Club, commenting, "Whether in their set lists or their patter, Blink always give the kids what they expect […] [Hoppus and DeLonge]'s Martin and Lewis act remains proudly moronic." Bealuon noted that the band "clearly favored" their new material and rushed through many past hits.

Future All Time Low member Alex Gaskarth attended the D.C. date of the tour, and discussed its impact on his career with Music Feeds in 2026.

== Tour dates ==
Date	City	Country	Venue
North America
November 6, 2003	Boston	United States	Avalon
November 7, 2003	Philadelphia	United States	TLA
November 8, 2003	Washington, D.C.	United States	9:30 Club
November 9, 2003	New York City	United States	Irving Plaza
November 12, 2003	Detroit	United States	Clutch Cargo's
November 13, 2003	Chicago	United States	House of Blues
November 14, 2003	Minneapolis	United States	Quest
November 17, 2003	Los Angeles	United States	Avalon
November 18, 2003	Los Angeles	United States	Avalon
November 21, 2003	San Diego	United States	SOMA
December 2, 2003	Toronto	Canada	The Phoenix
