= Blink-182 Tour =

2003–04 concert tour

- Tour by Blink-182
- Location: Asia; Europe; North America; Oceania
- Associated album: Blink-182
- Start date: December 3, 2003
- End date: December 16, 2004
- Legs: 1
- No. of shows: 80
- Supporting acts: The Nervous Return; Motion City Soundtrack; Brand New; Gyroscope; Cypress Hill; Taking Back Sunday; Fall Out Boy; The Used; Sparta

Blink-182 concert chronology
- DollaBill Tour (2003); Untitled Album Tour (2003–04); Blink-182 in Concert (2009–10)

The Untitled Album Tour was a concert tour by American rock band Blink-182 in support of the group's untitled fifth studio album (2003). The arena and amphitheater began December 2, 2003 in Toronto and concluded December 16, 2004 in Dublin, Ireland. Support acts over the course of the tour included The Nervous Return, Motion City Soundtrack, Brand New, Gyroscope, Cypress Hill, Taking Back Sunday, Fall Out Boy, the Used, and Sparta. It was the band's final tour before their initial disbandment from 2005 to 2009.

The tour was organized in support of the band’s fifth studio album and included the band's first performances for troops stationed in the Persian Gulf and Bahrain, marking their only visits to the Middle East. The tour also featured extended runs in Australia, as well as the band’s first-ever concerts in Mexico and Japan. The tour grossed $14.4 million from 42 concerts that drew more than 421,000 fans, according to Billboard Boxscore.

== Background ==
The band approached its 2004 tour with a renewed emphasis on creating a more immersive live experience. The tour's full stage production included extensive lighting effects and five large video screens. DeLonge said the tour would feature "electronic parts", "weird segues", and atmospheric interludes inspired by Pink Floyd, with minimal stage banter in favor of a continuous, dynamic performance that shifted between ethereal passages and high-energy songs. He nevertheless joked that "every once in a while there is a penis joke that might come out of us." He said the band sought to reinvent its live show for the 2004 tour by blending older hits with new material, aiming to deliver a show that was "completely new" while remaining recognizable to longtime fans.

The tour began following the conclusion of the DollaBill Tour, opening with a series of Christmas radio shows in December 2003. A European leg followed in February 2004, with Australian dates in March. The band then performed their first concerts in Mexico in April before embarking on a North American leg, alongside Cypress Hill, that concluded in Honolulu. In mid-2004, the band co-headlined a separate North American tour with No Doubt. Additional legs included a four-city Japanese tour in August and a larger Australian run in September. During breaks in the schedule, the band appeared at the Teen Choice Awards and participated in MTV Icon honoring The Cure, where they performed a cover of "A Letter to Elise". The final leg consisted of an eleven-date European tour focused mainly on the United Kingdom. The band also traveled with a portable recording studio during the tour, allowing them to continue working on new material while on the road.

Notable moments from the tour included Robert Smith of the Cure joining the band onstage during their shows at Wembley Arena in December 2004. During the tour, Blink-182 participated in a Habitat for Humanity project in Harrisburg as part of the Raise the Roof initiative;. guitarist Tom DeLonge and bassist Mark Hoppus helped paint a home before the band's concert in nearby Hershey. At the final show in Dublin, opening act The Kinison staged an onstage prank during a performance of "The Rock Show". A recurring gag during the tour involved Hoppus performing an amateur drum solo as the show came to a close.

Portions of a concert were filmed and included in an episode of MTV's Laguna Beach: The Real Orange County. The band also planned to film material for a live concert film, directed by Estevan Oriol, intended for release in 2005. Bassist Mark Hoppus compared the project to Pink Floyd: Live at Pompeii. The project was shelved following the band's breakup, although an unfinished workprint leaked online in 2022.

=== Support acts ===
Support acts over the course of the tour included The Nervous Return, Motion City Soundtrack, Brand New, Gyroscope, Cypress Hill, Taking Back Sunday, Fall Out Boy, the Used, and Sparta. Death Cab for Cutie were scheduled to open the December 2004 dates, but canceled due to illness.

=== Injury and rescheduled shows ===
After a concert in Melbourne, drummer Travis Barker fractured his right foot in a fall. Despite performing the next show in Adelaide using a modified drum setup, the injury forced Blink-182 to postpone Australian dates in Perth, Sydney, and Brisbane, as well as postpone a scheduled tour of Japan. The dates were later expanded, and rescheduled and performed in August and September 2004. Despite ongoing recovery, Barker remained on tour throughout mid-2004 and performed while wearing a cast. After his recovery from foot surgery, a signed cast worn by him was auctioned on eBay. Decorated with stickers, graffiti, and doodles, the cast was sold through Barker’s clothing brand Famous Stars and Straps, with proceeds benefiting a charity selected by Barker.

== Reception ==
Michael D. Clark of the Houston Chronicle praised the interplay between Mark Hoppus' and Tom DeLonge's vocals during the tour, writing that Hoppus' "deep, pinched whines" complemented DeLonge's "clear, capable" voice, allowing the band's newer songs to move fluidly between distinctive vocal styles, tempos, and musical textures. Writing for The Guardian, Dave Simpson praised the band's live musicianship, particularly Tom DeLonge’s "fearsome pop melodies" and Travis Barker’s "hyperactive but sublime drumming," but felt the group struggled to balance its more serious material with its trademark juvenile humor.

== Tour dates ==
List of 2003 concerts, showing date, city, country, venue and support acts
Date	City	Country	Venue	Support act(s)
December 2, 2003	Toronto	Canada	Phoenix Concert Theatre	
December 3, 2003	Boston	United States	Orpheum Theatre	
December 5, 2003	New York City	United States	Hammerstein Ballroom	
December 11, 2003	Sacramento	United States	ARCO Arena	
December 14, 2003	Universal City	United States	Universal Amphitheatre	

List of 2004 concerts, showing date, city, country, venue and support acts
Date	City	Country	Venue	Support act(s)
February 6, 2004	London	England	Wembley Arena	The Nervous Return; Motion City Soundtrack
February 7, 2004	Manchester	England	Manchester Arena	The Nervous Return; Motion City Soundtrack
February 8, 2004	Renfrewshire	Scotland	Braehead Arena	The Nervous Return; Motion City Soundtrack
February 10, 2004	Nottingham	England	Nottingham Arena	The Nervous Return; Motion City Soundtrack
February 11, 2004	London	England	Hammersmith Apollo	The Nervous Return; Motion City Soundtrack
February 13, 2004	Munich	Germany	Olympiahalle	The Nervous Return; Motion City Soundtrack
February 14, 2004	Zürich	Switzerland	Hallenstadion	The Nervous Return; Motion City Soundtrack
February 15, 2004	Bologna	Italy	Sports Hall	—N/a
February 17, 2004	Düsseldorf	Germany	P. Halle	Motion City Soundtrack
February 18, 2004	Paris	France	Le Zénith	Motion City Soundtrack
March 10, 2004	West Melbourne	Australia (Note: The band was scheduled for an entire tour in Australia, but cancelled when Barker broke his foot.)	Festival Hall	Brand New and Gyroscope
March 11, 2004	West Melbourne	Australia	Festival Hall	Brand New and Gyroscope
March 14, 2004	Adelaide	Australia	Adelaide Entertainment Centre	Brand New and Gyroscope
April 22, 2004	Monterrey	Mexico	Auditorio Coca-Cola	Panda
April 23, 2004	Mexico City	Mexico	Palacio de los Deportes	Panda
April 24, 2004	Mexico City	Mexico	Palacio de los Deportes	Panda
April 29, 2004	Boise	United States	Idaho Center	Cypress Hill and Taking Back Sunday
April 30, 2004	West Valley City	United States	E Center	Cypress Hill and Taking Back Sunday
May 1, 2004	Greenwood Village	United States	Coors Amphitheatre	Cypress Hill, Taking Back Sunday, and Reeve Oliver
May 3, 2004	Dallas	United States	Smirnoff Music Center	Cypress Hill, Taking Back Sunday, and Reeve Oliver
May 4, 2004	Selma	United States	Verizon Wireless Amphitheater	Cypress Hill, Taking Back Sunday, and Reeve Oliver
May 5, 2004	The Woodlands	United States	Cynthia Woods Mitchell Pavilion	Cypress Hill, Taking Back Sunday, and Reeve Oliver
May 7, 2004	Atlanta	United States	HiFi Buys Amphitheatre	Cypress Hill, Taking Back Sunday, and Motion City Soundtrack
May 8, 2004	Orlando	United States	TD Waterhouse Centre	Cypress Hill and Taking Back Sunday
May 9, 2004	West Palm Beach	United States	Sound Advice Amphitheatre	Cypress Hill and Taking Back Sunday
May 11, 2004	Charlotte	United States	Verizon Wireless Amphitheatre	Cypress Hill, Taking Back Sunday, and Fall Out Boy
May 12, 2004	Raleigh	United States	Alltel Pavilion	Cypress Hill, Taking Back Sunday, and Fall Out Boy
May 14, 2004	Columbus	United States	Germain Amphitheater	Cypress Hill, Taking Back Sunday, and Fall Out Boy
May 15, 2004	Maryland Heights	United States	UMB Bank Pavilion	Cypress Hill, Taking Back Sunday, and Fall Out Boy
May 16, 2004	Bonner Springs	United States	Verizon Wireless Amphitheater	Cypress Hill, Taking Back Sunday, and Fall Out Boy
May 18, 2004	Minneapolis	United States	Target Center	Cypress Hill and Taking Back Sunday
May 20, 2004	Cincinnati	United States	Riverbend Music Center	The Used and Taking Back Sunday
May 21, 2004	Clarkston	United States	DTE Energy Center	The Used and Taking Back Sunday
May 22, 2004	Burgettstown	United States	Post-Gazette Pavilion	The Used, Taking Back Sunday, and the Nervous Return
May 24, 2004	Virginia Beach	United States	Verizon Wireless Amphitheater	The Used, Taking Back Sunday, and the Nervous Return
May 25, 2004	Scranton	United States	Montage Mountain Ski Resort	The Used, Taking Back Sunday, and the Nervous Return
May 26, 2004	Hershey	United States	Hershey Pavilion	The Used and Taking Back Sunday
May 28, 2004	Toronto	Canada	Molson Amphitheatre	The Used, Taking Back Sunday, and the Nervous Return
May 29, 2004	Toronto	Canada	Molson Amphitheatre	The Used, Taking Back Sunday, and the Nervous Return
May 30, 2004	Darien	United States	Darien Lake Performing Arts Center	The Used and Taking Back Sunday
June 5, 2004	Hartford	United States	ctnow.com Meadows Music Theatre	The Used
June 6, 2004	Camden	United States	Tweeter Center	The Used
June 28, 2004 (Note: This concert was a part of Summerfest.)	Milwaukee	United States	Henry Maier Festival Park	Motion City Soundtrack
July 30, 2004 (Note: This concert was a part of the California Mid State Fair.)	Paso Robles	United States	Paso Robles Event Center	—N/a
August 13, 2004	Honolulu	United States	Neal S. Blaisdell Center	
August 14, 2004	Maui	United States	Maui Arts & Cultural Center	
August 17, 2004	Fukuoka	Japan	Zepp	Motion City Soundtrack
August 19, 2004	Osaka	Japan	Zepp	Motion City Soundtrack
August 20, 2004	Osaka	Japan	Zepp	Motion City Soundtrack
August 21, 2004	Nagoya	Japan	Diamond Hall	Motion City Soundtrack
August 23, 2004	Tokyo	Japan	Zepp Tokyo	Motion City Soundtrack
August 24, 2004	Tokyo	Japan	Zepp Tokyo	Motion City Soundtrack
August 25, 2004	Tokyo	Japan	Zepp Tokyo	Motion City Soundtrack
August 28, 2004	Canberra	Australia	Australian Indoor Stadium	Sparta and Gyroscope
August 29, 2004	Wollongong	Australia	WIN Entertainment Centre	Sparta and Gyroscope
August 31, 2004	Melbourne	Australia	Festival Hall	Sparta and Gyroscope
September 2, 2004	Newcastle	Australia	Newcastle Entertainment Centre	Sparta and Gyroscope
September 3, 2004	Brisbane	Australia	Brisbane Entertainment Centre	Sparta and Gyroscope
September 4, 2004	Brisbane	Australia	Brisbane Entertainment Centre	Sparta and Gyroscope
September 6, 2004	Sydney	Australia	Hordern Pavilion	Sparta and Gyroscope
September 7, 2004	Sydney	Australia	Hordern Pavilion	Sparta and Gyroscope
September 8, 2004	Sydney	Australia	Hordern Pavilion	Sparta and Gyroscope
September 9, 2004	Sydney	Australia	Hordern Pavilion	Sparta and Gyroscope
November 30, 2004	Birmingham	England	National Exhibition Centre	
December 1, 2004	Glasgow	Scotland	Scottish Exhibition and Conference Centre	
December 2, 2004	Newcastle	England	Metro Radio Arena	
December 3, 2004	Manchester	England	Manchester Arena Supported by The Kinison and Sugarcult	
December 5, 2004	London	England	Wembley Arena	
December 6, 2004	London	England	Wembley Arena	
December 7, 2004	Cardiff	Wales	Cardiff International Arena	
December 8, 2004	Nottingham	England	Nottingham Arena	
December 10, 2004	Paris	France	Palais Omnisports de Paris-Bercy	
December 11, 2004	Münster	Germany	Messe und Congress Centrum Halle Münsterland	
December 13, 2004	Nottingham	England	Nottingham Arena	
December 14, 2004	London	England	Carling Academy Brixton	
December 16, 2004	Dublin	Ireland	Point Theatre	
