= Kings of the Weekend =

2018 residency show

- Residency by Blink-182
- Location: Paradise, Nevada, U.S.
- Venue: Pearl Concert Theater at Palms Casino Resort
- Start date: May 26, 2018
- End date: November 17, 2018
- Legs: 1
- No. of shows: 12

Blink-182 concert chronology
- California Tour (2016–17); Kings of the Weekend (2018); Blink-182 and Lil Wayne Tour (2019)

Kings of the Weekend was a concert residency by American rock band Blink-182. It was held at the Pearl Concert Theater at Palms Casino Resort on the Las Vegas Strip in Paradise, Nevada. It marked the band's first extended Las Vegas engagement. Announced in March 2018 and running intermittently from May through November, the residency featured bassist Mark Hoppus, drummer Travis Barker, and guitarist Matt Skiba performing a career-spanning set that drew heavily from the band's late-1990s and 2000s catalog as well as material from its most recent album, California.

The shows balanced a stripped-down visual presentation with bursts of theatricality, including pyrotechnics, smoke effects, inflatable props, and an Elvis impersonator opening each night with "Viva Las Vegas". The run was notably affected by Travis Barker's health issues; several dates were postponed after he was hospitalized with blood clots. Critics framed Kings of the Weekend as both a polished evolution of Blink-182's live identity and a sign of pop-punk's absorption into the Las Vegas "classic rock" residency circuit.

== Background ==
The residency was announced on March 19, 2018, through a partnership between Live Nation and the Palms Casino Resort. At the time, the lineup of the band consisted of Mark Hoppus, Travis Barker, and Matt Skiba, who had joined the group in 2015 following the departure of founding member Tom DeLonge. The outing was named after "Kings of the Weekend", a song on the band's most recent album, California (2016). The song thematically embraces reckless, carefree weekend fun, which matched the spirit of Las Vegas and its party-driven, indulgent atmosphere. To promote the residency, the band performed the song on Jimmy Kimmel Live!.

For much of the 20th century, Las Vegas residencies were primarily associated with lounge singers, crooners, and legacy entertainers. However, the commercial perception of the Las Vegas residency shifted significantly in the 2000s and 2010s, with many big-name pop and rock acts embracing the residency model. The residency also coincided with renovations to the Pearl Concert Theater, which had been redesigned as a more intimate live venue with a reduced distance between performers and audience members.

== Performances ==
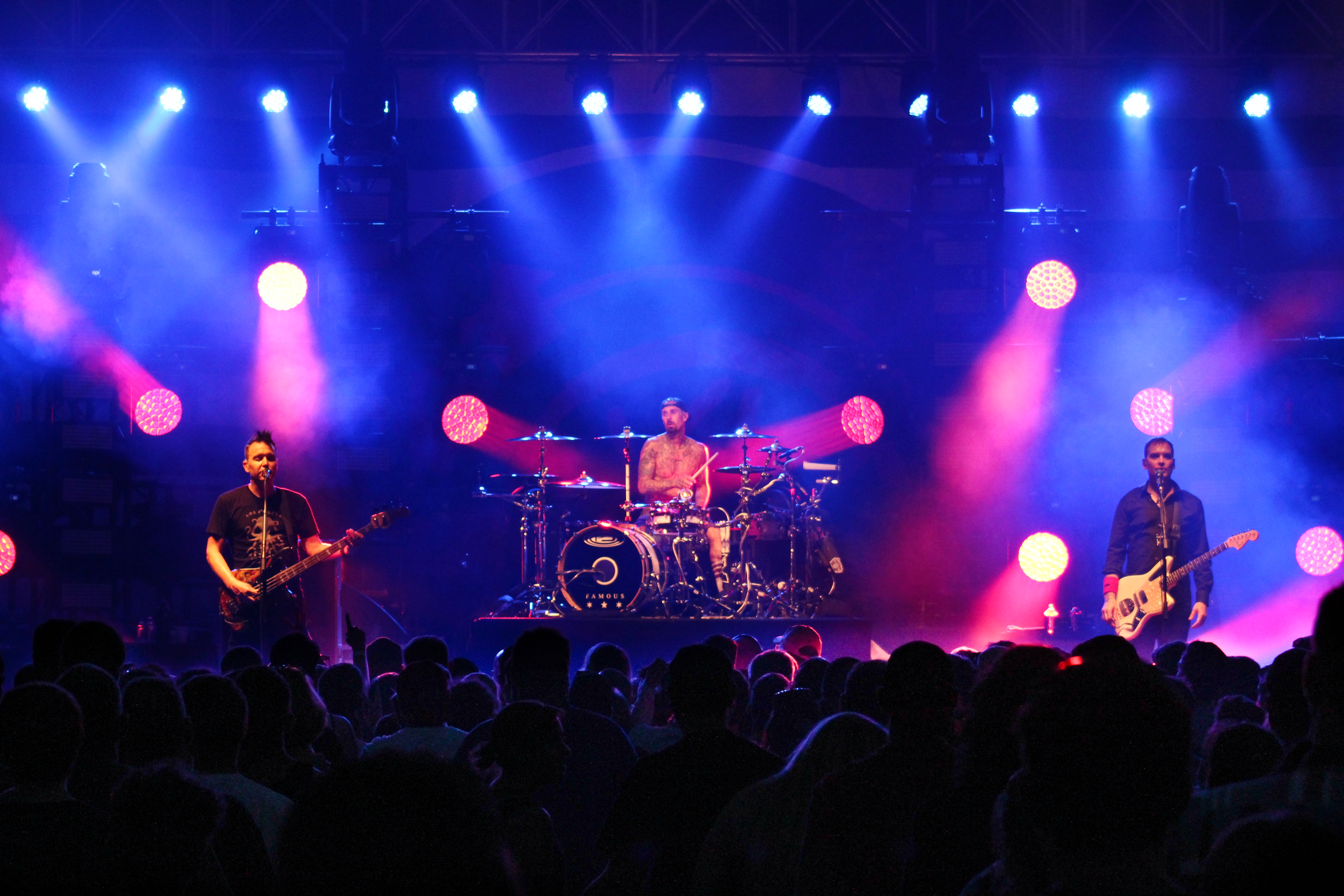
Blink-182 performing in 2016.

The residency opened on May 26, 2018, and continued intermittently through November 17, 2018. The concerts featured material spanning the band's career, including songs from Enema of the State, Take Off Your Pants and Jacket, the untitled 2003 album, and California.

According to statements released during the announcement, the band intended to embrace Las Vegas entertainment culture with tongue-in-cheek references to showgirls and theatrical stage antics. Mark Hoppus joked that the group might "marry someone onstage" during the run. Tickets started at $59. Altogether, Kings of the Weekend largely avoided the elaborate theatricality associated with many Las Vegas residencies, instead emphasizing Blink-182's performance and irreverent stage humor. The concerts featured minimal staging, with the band performing in front of a draped backdrop and video screens displaying close-ups of the trio, while Travis Barker's elevated drum riser served as the visual centerpiece of the production. Shows opened with an Elvis impersonator performing "Viva Las Vegas" before the band launched into "Feeling This", and the setlists mixed major hits with rarely performed songs such as "Mutt", "The Party Song", and "Adam's Song", which had not appeared regularly in live performances since 2009. Although the production remained comparatively conservative to the band's arena offerings, it did incorporate pyrotechnics, smoke effects, inflatable props, and an acoustic segment.

Mark Hoppus said that performing the residency required the band to "work a little harder" to compete with the sheer volume of entertainment in Las Vegas, noting that the city's audience—made up of both dedicated fans and casual visitors—has endless alternatives like Cirque du Soleil, making it necessary for the band to deliver a particularly strong show to stand out. Singer-songwriter Goody Grace made an appearance during the residency, joining the band for "Dumpweed", which he described as his favorite Blink-182 song. Several dates were affected after Travis Barker developed blood clots in his arms, leading to postponements before the residency resumed later that year. The drummer was suffering from a staph infection and cellulitis; he was advised that drumming would aggravate inflammation in his arms even as he was ultimately cleared to return to performing once his condition improved.

== Reception ==
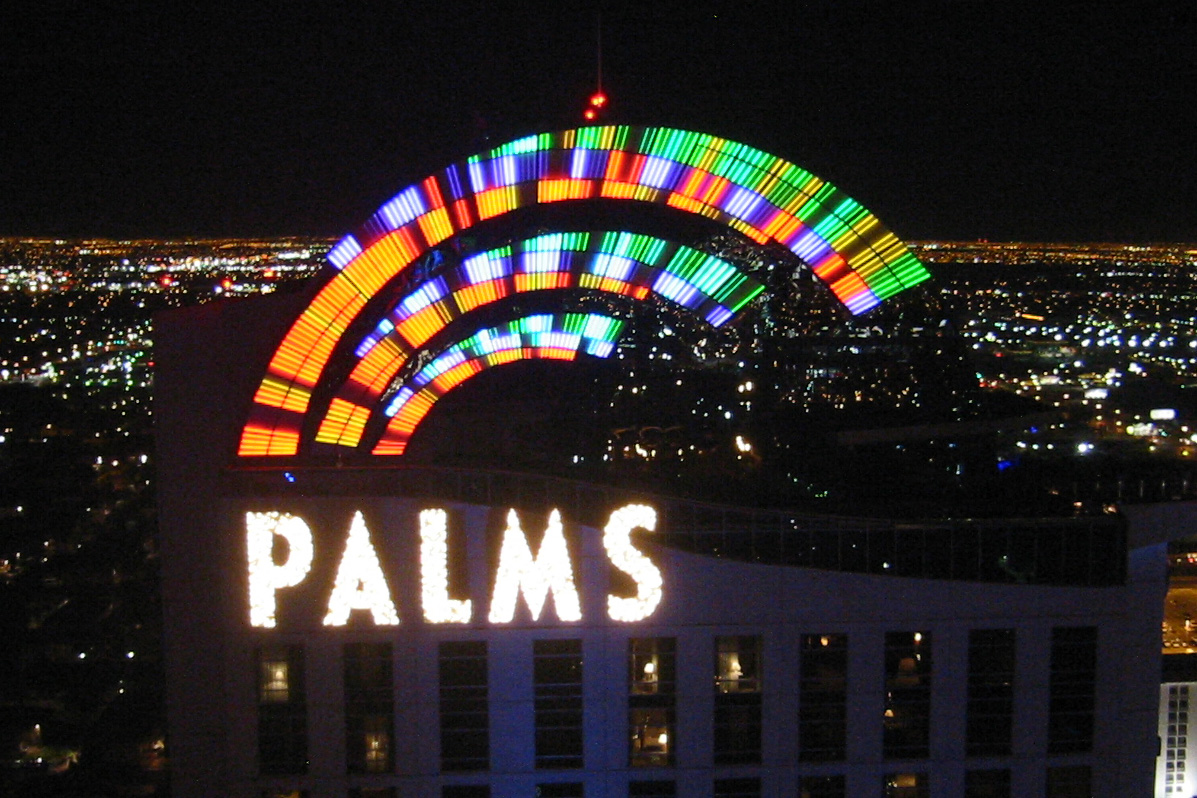
Neon signage atop the Palms hotel tower.

Jason Bracelin of the Las Vegas Review-Journal described Kings of the Weekend as both a nostalgic celebration of late-1990s pop-punk culture and evidence of Blink-182's evolution into a polished arena-rock act, balancing adolescent humor with tighter musicianship and a more mature stage presence.

Kings of the Weekend was one of the first major punk rock residencies in Las Vegas and demonstrated the growing presence of alternative rock acts in the city's residency market, which had traditionally been associated with pop performers and legacy acts. Writing for Forbes, Bryan Rolli suggested that Blink-182's Las Vegas residency marked the band's transition into "classic rock" territory, positioning the group alongside legacy acts whose long-running popularity and nostalgic appeal made them well-suited for the residency format. Similarly, Chris DeVille of Stereogum interpreted the residency announcement as evidence that "mall punk" had effectively become a form of classic rock.

== Tour dates ==
List of 2018 concerts, showing date, city, country, and venue
Date	City	Country	Venue
May 26, 2018	Las Vegas	United States	Palms Casino Resort
May 27, 2018	Las Vegas	United States	Palms Casino Resort
June 8, 2018	Las Vegas	United States	Palms Casino Resort
June 9, 2018	Las Vegas	United States	Palms Casino Resort
October 26, 2018	Las Vegas	United States	Palms Casino Resort
October 27, 2018	Las Vegas	United States	Palms Casino Resort
November 2, 2018	Las Vegas	United States	Palms Casino Resort
November 3, 2018	Las Vegas	United States	Palms Casino Resort
November 9, 2018	Las Vegas	United States	Palms Casino Resort
November 10, 2018	Las Vegas	United States	Palms Casino Resort
November 16, 2018	Las Vegas	United States	Palms Casino Resort
November 17, 2018	Las Vegas	United States	Palms Casino Resort
