= PooPoo PeePee Tour =

1998 concert tour by Blink-182

- Tour by Blink-182
- Tour poster
- Location: North America
- Associated album: Dude Ranch
- Start date: July 27, 1998
- End date: October 25, 1998
- Legs: 2
- No. of shows: 55
- Supporting acts: The Ataris; MxPx; Loose Nuts; Home Grown; Jimmy Eat World; Wade; The Vandals; Unwritten Law; Assorted Jelly Beans; Riverfenix; Reel Big Fish; Spring Heeled Jack; Frenzal Rhomb

Blink-182 concert chronology
- SnoCore 98 (1998); PooPoo PeePee Tour (1998); Loserkids Tour (1999)

The PooPoo PeePee Tour was a concert tour by rock band Blink-182, Launched in support of the group's 1997 album Dude Ranch, the tour visited clubs and theaters in the summer/fall of 1998. It was the first major tour with drummer Travis Barker, who replaced original drummer Scott Raynor midway through a summer tour. Supporting acts included Unwritten Law and Home Grown. On October 1, 1998, the tour merged for one night only with the ongoing Reel Big Fish, Spring Heeled Jack and Frenzal Rhomb tour at the Hunka Bunka Ballroom in Sayreville, New Jersey.

== Supporting acts ==
- The Ataris (July 27–28)
- MxPx (August 4–23)
- Loose Nuts (August 22–23)
- Home Grown (July 28–30, August 2–23)
- Jimmy Eat World (July 28–30, August 2–6)
- Wade (August 9–23)
- The Vandals (September 25–26)
- Unwritten Law (October 2–25)
- Assorted Jelly Beans (October 2–25)
- Riverfenix (October 4–25)
- Reel Big Fish (October 1)
- Spring Heeled Jack (October 1)
- Frenzal Rhomb (October 1)

== Tour dates ==
Date	City	Country	Venue
North America Leg #1
July 27, 1998	Ventura	United States	Ventura Theatre
July 28, 1998	Ventura	United States	Ventura Theatre
July 30, 1998	Anchorage	United States	William A. Egan Civic and Convention Center
July 31, 1998^{[A]}	Estacada	United States	Timberbowl
August 1, 1998	Bremerton	United States	Kitsap Bowl^{[B]}
August 2, 1998	San Francisco	United States	Maritime
August 4, 1998	Modesto	United States	Modesto Centre
August 5, 1998	Reno	United States	Pioneer Center for the Performing Arts
August 6, 1998	Boise	United States	Skateworld
August 7, 1998	Spokane	United States	Playfair Race Track
August 8, 1998	Bozeman	United States	Gallatin County Fairgrounds
August 9, 1998	Pocatello	United States	Bannock County Fairgrounds
August 11, 1998	Salt Lake City	United States	Wasatch Events Center
August 12, 1998	Denver	United States	Ogden Theatre
August 13, 1998	Boulder	United States	Boulder Theatre
August 14, 1998	Lawrence	United States	Liberty Hall
August 15, 1998	St. Louis	United States	The Galaxy
August 17, 1998	Chicago	United States	House of Blues
August 18, 1998	Minneapolis	United States	Quest Club
August 19, 1998	Milwaukee	United States	The Rave Ballroom
August 20, 1998	Cincinnati	United States	Bogart's
August 21, 1998	Columbus	United States	Newport Music Hall
August 22, 1998	Pittsburgh	United States	Metropol
August 23, 1998	Cleveland	United States	Odeon Concert Club
North America Leg #2		United States	
September 19, 1998	Phoenix	United States	Peoria Sports Complex
September 20, 1998	Fresno	United States	Paul Paul Theater^{[C]}
September 22, 1998	Syracuse	United States	Goldstein Auditorium
September 23, 1998	Rochester	United States	Harro East Ballroom
September 24, 1998	Columbus	United States	Newport Music Hall
September 25, 1998	Toronto	Canada	RPM Warehouse
September 26, 1998	Montreal	Canada	CEPSUM
September 27, 1998	State College	United States	Woodward Skate Camp
September 28, 1998	Poughkeepsie	United States	The Chance
September 29, 1998	New York City	United States	Irving Plaza
September 30, 1998	Hartford	United States	Webster Theater
October 1, 1998	Sayreville	United States	Hunka Bunka Ballroom
October 2, 1998	Worcester	United States	Worcester Palladium
October 3, 1998	Philadelphia	United States	Electric Factory
October 4, 1998	Washington, D.C.	United States	9:30 Club
October 6, 1998	Virginia Beach	United States	Peabody's
October 7, 1998	Atlanta	United States	Masquerade
October 8, 1998	Jacksonville	United States	Milk Bar
October 9, 1998	Lake Buena Vista	United States	House of Blues
October 10, 1998	Hallandale Beach	United States	Button South
October 11, 1998	St. Petersburg	United States	Jannus Landing
October 13, 1998	New Orleans	United States	Tipitina's
October 14, 1998	Shreveport	United States	Malibu Beach Club
October 15, 1998	Houston	United States	Fitzgerald's
October 16, 1998	Dallas	United States	Dallas Music Complex
October 17, 1998	Austin	United States	Stubbs BBQ
October 22, 1998	Las Vegas	United States	The Joint
October 23, 1998	Bakersfield, California	United States	Sam Lynn Ballpark
October 24, 1998	San Diego	United States	Soma
October 25, 1998	San Diego	United States	Soma

Festivals and other miscellaneous performances

^{A} This concert was a part of KNRK Big Stink '98
^{B} This concert was a part of KNDD Endfest '98
^{C} This concert was a part of KFRR B-Day Bash II

== Reception ==
Roger Catlin of the Hartford Courant wrote that although blink-182 was "extraordinarily sloppy" onstage, the trio remained compelling because its raw energy outweighed its lack of polish. He likened DeLonge and Hoppus' onstage rapport to the Smothers Brothers, writing that the pair traded jokes and mocked one another between songs with the timing of a comedy act. Marty Beckerman of the Anchorage Daily News complimented the band's "amazing musical talent and crude wit." Donnie Moorhouse of the Union-News argued that blink-182 had outgrown comparisons to Green Day and Weezer, writing that its combination of strong melodies and relatable coming-of-age lyrics distinguished the band from its peers.
