= Loserkids Tour =

1999 concert tour by Blink-182

- Tour by Blink-182
- Location: North America
- Associated album: Enema of the State
- Start date: November 2, 1999
- End date: November 20, 1999
- Legs: 1
- No. of shows: 14
- Supporting acts: Silverchair; Fenix*TX

Blink-182 concert chronology
- PooPoo PeePee Tour (1998); Loserkids Tour (1999); The Mark, Tom and Travis Show Tour (2000–01)

The Loserkids Tour was a concert tour by rock band Blink-182. Launched in support of the group's 1999 album Enema of the State, the tour visited amphitheatres and arenas in November 1999. The tour was supported by Silverchair and Fenix*TX.

The November 4–5 shows were recorded for the band's live album The Mark, Tom, and Travis Show (The Enema Strikes Back!), which would be released a year later.

== Reception ==
Reviewing the band's live show, Jane Ganahl of the San Francisco Examiner praised blink-182's energy and musicianship but felt the performance worked better on record. She wrote argued that too many songs blurred together melodically, making the set feel repetitive.

== Tour dates ==
Date	City	Country	Venue
Warm-up shows
Supported by: Fenix*TX
October 24, 1999	Las Vegas	United States	Hilton Hotel
October 29, 1999	Irvine	United States	Donald Bren Events Center
October 30, 1999	San Diego	United States	Cox Arena
North America
Supported by: Silverchair, Fenix*TX, Lit
November 2, 1999	Mesa	United States	Mesa Amphitheatre
November 3, 1999	San Luis Obispo	United States	Cal Poly Recreation Center
November 4, 1999	San Francisco	United States	Bill Graham Civic Auditorium
November 5, 1999	Universal City	United States	Universal Amphitheatre
November 8, 1999	St. Paul	United States	Roy Wilkins Auditorium
November 10, 1999	Toronto	Canada	Maple Leaf Gardens
November 11, 1999	Montreal	Canada	Pavillon Bell at the Parc Jarry
November 12, 1999	Lowell	United States	Tsongas Arena
November 13, 1999	New York City	United States	Roseland Ballroom
November 14, 1999	Asbury Park	United States	Convention Hall
November 16, 1999	Philadelphia	United States	Electric Factory
November 18, 1999	Orlando	United States	UCF Arena
November 19, 1999	Jacksonville	United States	Riverview Music Shed
November 20, 1999	Atlanta	United States	The Tabernacle
