= Family Reunion (Blink-182 song) =

Promotional single by Blink-182

from the album Short Music for Short People
- Released: June 1, 1999
- Recorded: 1999
- Genre: Pop-punk; comedy rock
- Length: 0:35
- Label: Fat Wreck Chords; MCA
- Songwriters: Mark Hoppus; Tom DeLonge
- Producer: Jerry Finn

"Family Reunion" is a song by the American rock band Blink-182. The song, which lasts only 35 seconds, is essentially a sung-through version of comedian George Carlin's seven dirty words routine: shit, piss, fuck, cunt, cocksucker, motherfucker, and tits, with the addition of fart, turd, and twat (words which Carlin had also mentioned in follow ups to the routine). Recorded in 1999, it was distributed as a promotional single for the band's third album, Enema of the State.

== Background ==
"Family Reunion" originated during the band's live concerts, where they created the song while joking around. A studio version was recorded at the behest of NOFX frontman Fat Mike, and it was included on Short Music for Short People, a 1999 Fat Wreck Chords compilation, featuring 101 short 30-second songs. The studio version was produced and mixed by Jerry Finn. The song was also released on a promotional CD given for free to radio programmers and record stores promoting the release of the band's third album, Enema of the State (1999).

The song is a staple of Blink-182's concert set lists. Numerous live recordings exist, most notably on the band's sole live album, The Mark, Tom and Travis Show (The Enema Strikes Back!) (2000). In 2015, Rolling Stone contributor Andy Greene named it the band's "single most juvenile song."
