= Man Overboard =

Man Overboard may refer to:

- Man overboard, an emergency in which a person has fallen off a boat or ship into the water

== Games ==
- Man overboard (dominoes), situation in dominoes when a player has no matching tiles and is forced to draw from the boneyard

== Literature ==
- Man Overboard!, a 1936 novel by Freeman Wills Crofts
- Man Overboard, a nonfiction book by Jose Dalisay Jr.
- Man Overboard (book), a 1995 nonfiction book by Burl Barer
- Man Overboard, a novel by Monica Dickens
- Man Overboard!, a novel by Francis Marion Crawford 1903

== Film and TV ==
- Man Overboard (film), a 1921 German film directed by Karl Grune
- "Man Overboard" (Yes, Prime Minister), a 1987 episode of Yes, Prime Minister

== Music ==
- Man Overboard (band), an American pop punk band

Albums

- Man Overboard (Man Overboard album), 2011
- Man Overboard (Bob Welch album), 1980
- Man Overboard (Buck 65 album), 2001
- Man Overboard, an album by Ian Hunter

Songs

- "Man Overboard" (Blink-182 song)
- "Man Overboard" (Do-Re-Mi song), 1985
- "Man Overboard", a song by Blondie from Blondie
- "Man Overboard", a song by The Caretaker Race
- "Man Overboard", a song by Eric Clapton from Money and Cigarettes
- "Man Overboard", a song by Polytechnic from Down til Dawn
- "Man Overboard", a song by Status Quo from Perfect Remedy
- "Man Overboard", a song by Puscifer from Conditions of My Parole
- "Man Overboard", a song by Far from Water & Solutions
