= Man Overboard (Man Overboard album) =

Studio album by Man Overboard
- Released: September 27, 2011
- Recorded: June 2011
- Studio: Cannon Found Soundation, New Jersey
- Genre: Pop-punk
- Length: 33:50
- Label: Rise
- Producer: Steve Klein

Man Overboard chronology
The Human Highlight Reel (2011)	Man Overboard (2011)	Heart Attack (2013)

Man Overboard is the second studio album by the American rock band Man Overboard. After the release of their debut album Real Talk (2010), guitarist Wayne Wildrick left the group, resulting in several line-up changes. In December 2010, the group had signed to independent label Rise Records, and aimed to release another album by fall of next year. Following Wildrick's return to the band in April 2011, the group began demoing songs for their next album the following month. With New Found Glory guitarist Steve Klein standing in as producer, the group recorded their second album at Cannon Found Soundation Studios in New Jersey in June. Following this, the band went on a European tour with Polar Bear Club. After the album was announced in August 2011, "Dead End Dreams" was made available for streaming later that month, followed by "Spunn" in mid-September.

Man Overboard was released on September 27, 2011, and received favorable reviews. Reviewers noted comparisons to Blink-182 and Green Day. The album reached number 181 on the Billboard 200 and debuted within the top 40 on three other Billboard charts. Following a support slot for New Found Glory, the band closed the year with a headlining US tour, and a support tour for The Early November in December. A music video was released for "Somethings Weird" in January, and later that month, the band went on a headlining UK tour. Another US tour took place in February and March. During this tour, it was announced that drummer Mike Hrycenko had left the group and was replaced by Joe Talarico. Following this, the band embarked on a tour of Europe and Russia in March and April. A music video for "Dead End Dreams" was released on June 5. The band then went on the Warped Tour throughout the summer. Two more tours of the US and one of the UK followed between September and December 2012.

== Background and recording ==
Following the release of their debut album Real Talk in July 2010, Man Overboard toured constantly throughout the rest of the year. In early September, it was announced that guitarist Wayne Wildrick had left the band. The band explained that Wildrick had "some personal things to take care of". As a result, drummer Justin Collier switched to guitar, and Mike Hrycenko was brought in to fill in on drums. In December, it was announced the band had signed to Rise Records, and that a new album was planned for release in fall 2011. In January 2011, the group demoed nine tracks. The following month, the group released The Absolute Worst EP as a stop-gap for fans until the band's second album appeared. In March, the band went on tour with The Wonder Years and Handguns.

On April 28, 2011, it was announced that Wildrick had re-joined the band after a phone call between him and vocalist/bassist Nik Bruzzese. On May 16, the group announced they were demoing new material at Bruzzese's studio, Small Hill Recording Studio. When the group began demoing "everyone just worked so well together," according to Wildrick. The band had 17 songs, which they would later narrow down before recording, which began in early June and ended before the band's European tour with Polar Bear Club. Recording took place at Cannon Found Soundation Studios in New Jersey with New Found Glory guitarist Steve Klein acting primarily as producer, while also providing additional engineering.

Jesse Cannon and Mike Oettinger engineered the sessions and provided additional production. Cannon and Klein came into the recording process with "outside ideas" and helped the group hear the songs differently, according to Wildrick. Wildrick explained that while recording, the band used different snare drums and cymbals than before. "Little things like that ... make subtle changes [so] the songs sound the best that they can." Videos of the band recording were released on June 17 and June 24. Paul Miner mixed the album, and Kris Crummett mastered it.

== Composition ==
Vocalist/guitarist Zac Eisenstein wrote the lyrics for a number of songs on the album. Wildrick considered the album "more picked-up," and the songs as being "definitely a lot more aggressive". He mentioned how "[s]ome bands write faster records first and start to slow down", but for Man Overboard they did the opposite. The opening track "Rare", "blew our minds," according to Eisenstein, as the band had not played anything as fast before. With "Teleport", Bruzzese said he "worked [his] ass off with the guitar work" for the track "trying to get it right". Klein, Eisenstein and Bruzzese dedicated a whole evening solely on the song's bridge. Bruzzese wrote the lyrics to "Voted Most Likely" while on tour with Senses Fail. After working with Klein, he said the track "for some reason reminds me the most of him". "Dead End Dreams" was a late addition to the album, according to Bruzzese. While in the demo process, the group thought the song had to make the album. According to Bruzzese it "happens to be the story of everyone in the band's life right now".

With "Somethings Weird," Eisenstein played Wildrick the song and "we got right to work". Wildrick felt the song "represents an awakening within a relationship". According to Collier, "Punishment" was "a [Bruzzese] song, and I feel he always writes sad tunes." Hrycenko found "Not the First" a challenge in keeping up with all of the transitions that the song had. He called it "pretty heavy, and the little roll on the ride in the bridge is super tight". According to Eisenstein, the group used to call "Headstone" the "H_{2}O Song" as they considered it "super manly, fast and punk". Eisenstein composed the guitar riff in a hotel in Arizona, and wrote the lyrics in the back of the group's van. The group had forgotten about "Spunn" until Jimmy Dunn, a friend of the band, reminded them about it. Dunn had a copy of Eisenstein's demo of the song, which he dug out for the group. According to Hrycenko "Picture Perfect" went through 10 different names because of the lyric about a car. Wildrick claimed that "Night Feelings" bridge shows that Bruzzese and Eisenstein are fans of 311. According to Collier, people who heard the album's final track, "Atlas," called it "a wild card of a song for this album". He felt the song did not have the same vibe as the rest of the songs on the album.

== Release and promotion ==
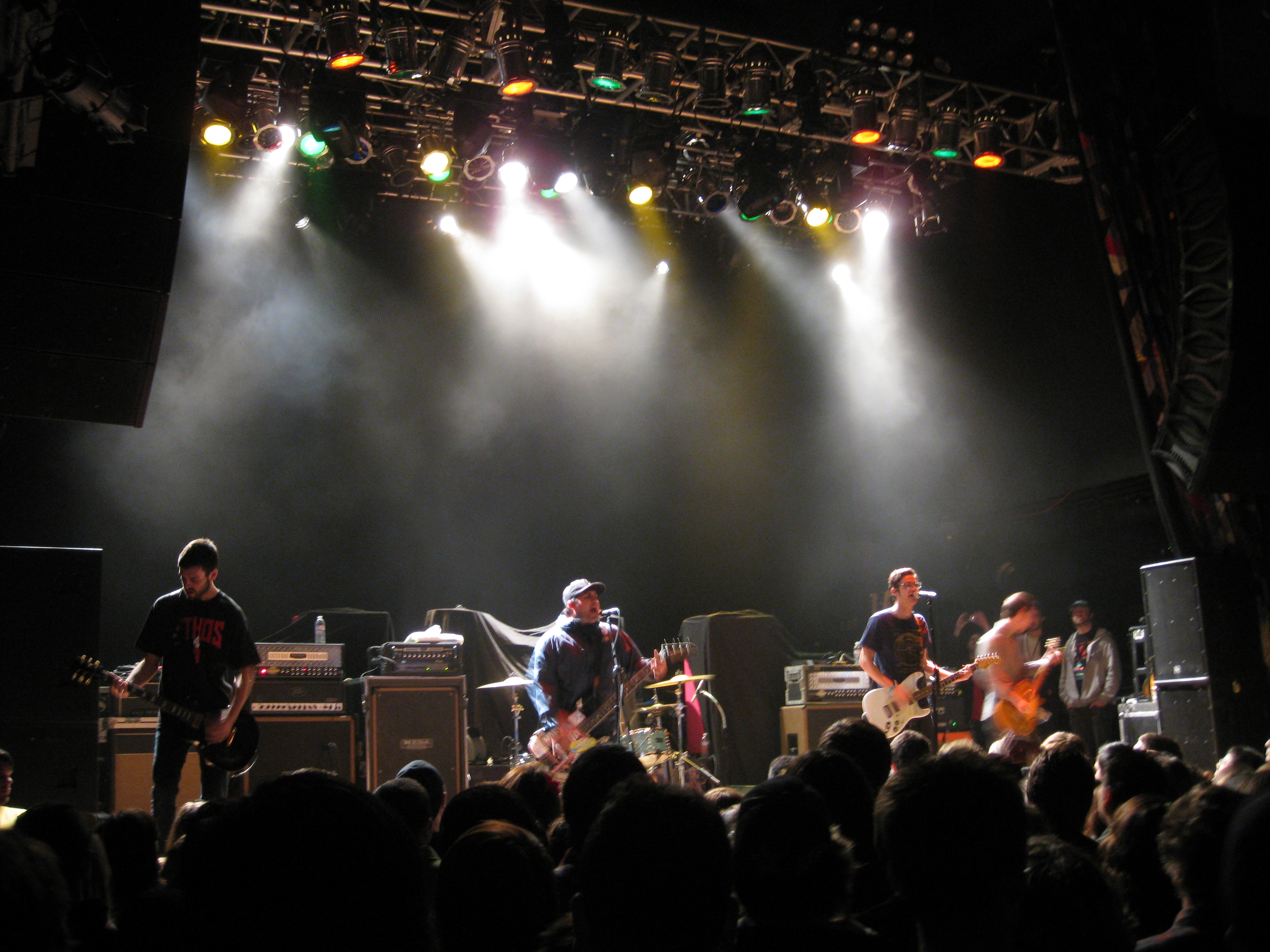
Man Overboard performing on New Found Glory's Pop Punks Not Dead Tour, November 20, 2011

On August 5, 2011, Man Overboard was announced for release, and the album's cover art and track listing were revealed. On August 24, "Dead End Dreams" was made available for streaming. Following this, the group went on a tour of Australia in late August and early September. "Spunn" was made available for streaming on September 16. A free download was also available, which included lyrics and a guitar tab for the song. Man Overboard was made available for streaming on September 25, and was released through Rise Records two days later. To celebrate the album's release, the band hosted a listening party. In October and November, the band supported New Found Glory on their Pop Punks Not Dead Tour in the US. In December, the band went on a US tour, with support from Daytrader and True Things. Before the tour, Daytrader was replaced by Handguns due to a family emergency. Also in December, the band supported The Early November during their holiday shows. On January 18, 2012, a music video was released for "Somethings Weird". In January and February, the band toured the UK, with support from The Story So Far and Save Your Breath.

On February 8, 2012, the band announced they would be filming a music video for "Dead End Dreams" during the week. Following this, the band went on the Pop Punk the Vote tour, across the US in February and March. They were supported by Handguns and Seahaven, with Candy Hearts opening the first half of the tour, and Daytrader opening the second half. On February 23, it was announced that Hrycenko had left the band and had been replaced by Joe Talarico. The band then went on The Rocksound Impericon tour in Europe from late March to mid-April, alongside Your Demise, Trapped Under Ice, and Basement. This was followed by a tour of Russia and Ukraine, alongside James Corbi. The music video for "Dead End Dreams" was teased on May 22, followed by a making-of video on May 30. The video was inspired by Pennywise's video for "Same Old Story" and premiered through MTV on June 5. The video, directed by Rob Soucy, was filmed in Philadelphia, Pennsylvania and Williamstown, New Jersey, earlier in the year.

The band went on the 2012 edition of Warped Tour between June and August. A deluxe edition of the album was released on July 3, featuring "Love Your Friends, Die Laughing" and live versions of four tracks. In September, the band went on a brief East Coast tour of the US with Major League, before touring across the West Coast the following month with Taking Back Sunday and Bayside. In November, the band went on the Road to Warped Tour in the UK, alongside New Found Glory, Less Than Jake and The Story So Far. From late November to early December, the band went on tour with Never Shout Never. In February 2013, the band held a contest where fans could download an instrumental track and record their own vocals over it. The winner won tickets, items from their web-store and a signed vinyl copy of Before We Met: A Collection of Old Songs (2010). The winning entry by Front Porch Step, as well as Man Overboard's version, of the track titled "Dump Me" was made available as a free download through Alternative Press' website.

== Reception ==
Professional ratings
Aggregate scores
Source	Rating
Metacritic	67/100
Review scores
Source	Rating
AbsolutePunk	70%
AllMusic	3/5 stars
Alter the Press!	4.5/5
Melodic	3/5 stars
Rock Sound	8/10

Man Overboard peaked at number 181 on the Billboard 200, as well as reaching number 6 on the Heatseekers Albums chart, number 18 on the Hard Rock Albums chart, and number 34 on the Independent Albums chart. It appeared on a best-of pop punk album list by Loudwire. Cleveland.com ranked "Dead End Dreams" at number 92 on their list of the top 100 pop-punk songs.

The album received generally favorable reviews from critics, according to review aggregation website Metacritic. AbsolutePunk staff member Thomas Nassiff called the album "slightly predictable ... [but] that isn't even close to a bad thing". Compared to their first album, he called the production "more clear, crisp and punchy". Overall, Nassiff said it was "a fun album with lyrics that, while they are not exactly impressive, apply to me and are fun to sing out loud". Kaj Roth of Melodic noted that Man Overboard's name was taken from the Blink-182 song of the same name; "it makes sense when I listen to their new album, which is a major flirt with [Blink-182's] early sound". He went on to say, "this is pop punk how it sounded back around 1999-2002 with faster songs and more focus on punk rock than pop". Alter the Press!'s Chantelle Goodchild said the band created a "neat package" of recordings, "not one of them you’d want to skip." Goodchild also said the record was "crazily catchy" and "highly addictive."

AllMusic reviewer William Ruhlmann opened his review by mentioning how the group released several songs in the preceding 18 months. Calling this decision "indicative of Man Overboard's youthful drive; this is a band that is in a hurry". This "rush" was "expressed in the breakneck tempos of the short (none over three and a half minutes) songs" on the group's self-titled album. Ruhlmann classified the album's sound as being "standard-issue" pop punk in the vein of Green Day and Blink-182, with "an echo" of Jimmy Eat World, in terms of the Bruzzese and Eisensteins' "contrasting vocals". Writing for Rock Sound, Andy Ritchie noted that the album "reveals little reinvention, but the nuts and bolts of what makes them so affable have only been tightened and polished further". He considered the band had "a formula that just works," concluding "there really isn’t a dud track here".

== Track listing ==
Track listing per booklet.

1. "Rare" – 3:04
2. "Teleport" – 2:46
3. "Voted Most Likely" – 2:52
4. "Dead End Dreams" – 3:12
5. "Somethings Weird" – 2:24
6. "Punishment" – 2:53
7. "Not the First" – 2:50
8. "Headstone" – 2:18
9. "Spunn" – 2:30
10. "Picture Perfect" – 3:04
11. "Night Feelings" – 3:24
12. "Atlas" – 2:35

Bonus tracks

Deluxe edition bonus tracks
No.	Title	Length
13.	"Love Your Friends, Die Laughing"	2:21
14.	"Real Talk" (live)	1:42
15.	"Not the First" (live)	2:37
16.	"Dear You" (live)	2:46
17.	"Atlas" (live)	2:09

== Personnel ==
Personnel per booklet.

Man Overboard

- Zac Eisenstein – vocals, guitar
- Nik Bruzzese – vocals, bass
- Justin Collier – guitar
- Wayne Wildrick – guitar
- Mike Hrycenko – drums

Production

- Steve Klein – producer, additional engineer
- Jesse Cannon – additional production, engineer
- Mike Oettinger – additional production, engineer
- Paul Miner – mixing
- Kris Crummett – mastering
- Ben Thomas – cover photo
- James Corbi – cover logo
- Toby Fraser – layout
- Peter Gambacorta – insert collage

== Charts ==
Chart (2011)	Peak position
US Billboard 200	181
US Billboard Hard Rock Albums	18
US Billboard Heatseekers Albums	6
US Billboard Independent Albums	34
