= Heavy Love (Man Overboard album) =

Studio album by Man Overboard
- Released: June 30, 2015
- Recorded: Early 2015
- Studio: The Blasting Room, Fort Collins, Colorado
- Genre: Pop punk
- Length: 39:15
- Label: Rise
- Producer: Bill Stevenson, Jason Livermore

Man Overboard chronology
Passing Ends (2014)	Heavy Love (2015)

Heavy Love is the fourth studio album by American rock band Man Overboard. It was released on June 30, 2015 by Rise Records.

== Background ==
In May 2013, Man Overboard released Heart Attack through Rise. Between March and May 2014, Man Overboard supported All Time Low on their A Love Like Tour in the US. Shortly afterwards, Man Overboard went on the Heart Attack tour in North America throughout May and June. It was the band's first headlining tour in a while, following a break – their longest in five years. During this break, some of the band members' relatives had died and a few of the members had gotten married.

The group released Passing Ends, an acoustic EP, in October 2014. The EP was "the biggest reflection" of the group's activities at the time and was the first time the group recorded material since their previous album Heart Attack (2013). In an October interview with Alternative Press, vocalist/guitarist Zac Eisenstein revealed the band were writing and demoing. While working out where to take their new material, Man Overboard was unsure how to "do justice to the emotions we were feeling", Collier revealed. In March and April 2015, the group supported Bayside on their headlining US tour.

== Recording and composition ==
It's one thing to be a good sound engineer or producer, but to do both and keep things moving at a comfortable pace is a whole other skill set to have. Bill has it all.

— Guitarist Justin Collier, discussing working with Stevenson, 2015

For the band's previous releases, they would write material on tour, then demo it after the tour had finished and then take the songs into the studio. For this new album, Bill Stevenson had the band play the songs live in the studio, instead of having them multitrack and listening to the finished result.

In early 2015 Heavy Love was recorded at The Blasting Room in Fort Collins, Colorado. It was the first time the band traveled far away from home to record. (Note: Previously, the band traveled to North Jersey to record Real Talk (2010) and Man Overboard (2011), and outside of Philadelphia to record Heart Attack (2013).) The album was produced by Stevenson and Jason Livermore, the former of which was a member of the Descendents. Members of Man Overboard grew up listening to the Descendents and were big fans. Guitarist Justin Collier called it "surreal" working with Stevenson. Stevenson gave the band creative control and helped keep the recording process in motion. Collier mentioned that the group were "figur[ing] out how to transition back into being a rock band".

On occasion, Eisenstein would be unsure about a particular guitar riff and say to Stevenson "Where do I draw the line between what I want to play and what people think I should play?" Stevenson would reply with "You draw it right fucking now, record your part!" Stevenson "pushed us by not pushing us, just allowing us to be creative", according to Eisenstein. Eisenstein revealed that there was nothing to distract the band "since we weren't going home to our family and friends every night". He likened it to "going on a little vacation".

Eisenstein mentioned that the group were attempting new ideas on the record. Eisenstein also mentioned that they were evolving as songwriters, thanks to Stevenson. The band was "achiev[ing] new sounds" that they had not previously gone for. At the same time, the sound of the band's previous albums is present. "Reality Check" was made in the vein of their earlier material from when they first formed. "The Note" was written a couple of weeks prior to recording. "She's in Pictures" was inspired by The Beach Boys.

== Release ==
On May 11, 2015 Heavy Love was announced for release and "Borderline" was made available for streaming. A day later, music videos for "Splinter", "Now That You're Home", and "Borderline" were released. On June 3, a music video was released for "Cliffhanger". "Reality Check" was previewed by Billboard on June 17. On June 25, the album was made available for streaming. Heavy Love was released on June 30 through Rise. (Note: U.S. Rise RISE 290-2) Following this, the band was set to play on the 2015 edition of Warped Tour. The band had the idea of releasing the album around Warped Tour as it was "the best opportunity for bands in our world to promote a record", according to guitarist Wayne Wildrick. On July 2, a music video for "She's in Pictures" was released. The band played in Japan in August and in Australia and New Zealand in September, supporting The Story So Far. In November, the band went on a tour of the US east coast with support from A Loss for Words, Northbound and WATERMEDOWN.

== Reception ==
Professional ratings
Review scores
Source	Rating
AbsolutePunk	9/10
Alternative Press	3.5/5 stars
Idobi Radio	7/10
Sputnikmusic	3.7/5

Alternative Press reviewer Greg Pratt states, the album "move[s] [the band] forward ever so slightly ... But much of the album is still mainly a solid homage to Blink[-182]". Mischa Pearlman of Rock Sound said the band were "firmly shutting the door on their adolescence" with the new album. Pearlman considered it "the start of a new and promising chapter" for the band.

The album charted at number 15 in the US on the Billboard Hard Rock Albums chart and at number 35 on the Independent Albums chart.

== Track listing ==
1. "Now That You're Home" – 3:05
2. "Borderline" – 3:02
3. "Reality Check" – 3:21
4. "Splinter" – 3:34
5. "The Note" – 3:58
6. "Cliffhanger" – 3:11
7. "She's in Pictures" – 2:37
8. "Invisible" – 3:26
9. "Deal" – 2:28
10. "Anything" – 3:19
11. "For Jennie" – 3:23
12. "A Love That I Can't Have" – 3:45

iTunes bonus track

13. "The First Degree" – 3:18

== Charts ==
Chart (2015)	Peak position
US Billboard Hard Rock Albums	15
US Billboard Independent Albums	35
