= The Mark, Tom, and Travis Show (The Enema Strikes Back!) =

Live album by Blink-182
- Released: November 7, 2000
- Recorded: November 4–5, 1999
- Venues: Bill Graham Civic Auditorium, San Francisco, California; Universal Amphitheatre, Universal City, California
- Genres: Punk rock; skate punk; pop-punk; comedy rock
- Length: 71:49
- Label: MCA
- Producer: Jerry Finn

Blink-182 chronology
Enema of the State (1999)	The Mark, Tom, and Travis Show (The Enema Strikes Back!) (2000)	Take Off Your Pants and Jacket (2001)

Singles from The Mark, Tom, and Travis Show (The Enema Strikes Back!)
- 1. "Man Overboard" Released: September 2, 2000

The Mark, Tom, and Travis Show (The Enema Strikes Back!) is a live album by American rock band Blink-182. It was released on November 7, 2000, by MCA Records. Blink-182 had risen to fame at the turn of the millennium on the strength of its third album, Enema of the State, which went multiplatinum. Capturing the band's stage show—known for its irreverent humor—with a live release was designed to satisfy fans between new studio albums. The album was recorded over two nights at performances in their native California, on the group's inaugural arena tour.

The album contains energetic, high-speed renditions of the band's catalogue up to that point in their career. The set list includes singles such as "All the Small Things", "What's My Age Again?", and "Dammit". Guitarist Tom DeLonge and bassist Mark Hoppus trade juvenile jokes in-between songs, while drummer Travis Barker performs with virtuosity. The album's sleeve was designed by artist Glen Hanson, who received an award for his work on it. Jerry Finn, the band's frequent collaborator, produced and mixed the album.

Marketed as a limited edition release, The Mark, Tom, and Travis Show was initially available for only two months at retail. During that time, the album sold over 500,000 copies in the US, earning a gold certification from the Recording Industry Association of America. "Man Overboard"—a bonus studio single recorded to promote its release—reached number two on Billboard's Modern Rock Tracks chart. The album proved influential for future pop punk acts, including Man Overboard and All Time Low. In recent years, the album has seen sporadic availability on digital platforms.

== Background ==
Blink-182 broke into the mainstream with its 1999 album Enema of the State—a fast, glossy pop-punk record with multiple hit singles. The LP proved enormously successful, shifting over five million units domestically, and three times that number worldwide. It became a time of transition for the group, who performed worldwide in larger venues than before, including amphitheaters, arenas, and stadiums. At the beginning of the album's promotional cycle, the trio were driving from show to show in a van with a trailer attached for merchandise and equipment; by its end, they were traveling by double-decker bus and flying on private jets. Bassist Mark Hoppus recalled that "we had gone from playing small clubs and sleeping on people's floors to headlining amphitheaters and staying in five-star hotels." Guitarist Tom DeLonge, in a band biography, recalled that touring arenas "was amazing, because it was the first time we'd ever done anything that big. I felt like a success story." Drummer Travis Barker, in his memoir Can I Say, recalled his newfound stardom: "[The] album took us all over the world, for months at a time. We were playing awards shows with [pop stars] Britney Spears and Christina Aguilera when we were used to hanging with bands like the Vandals, Unwritten Law, and 7 Seconds."

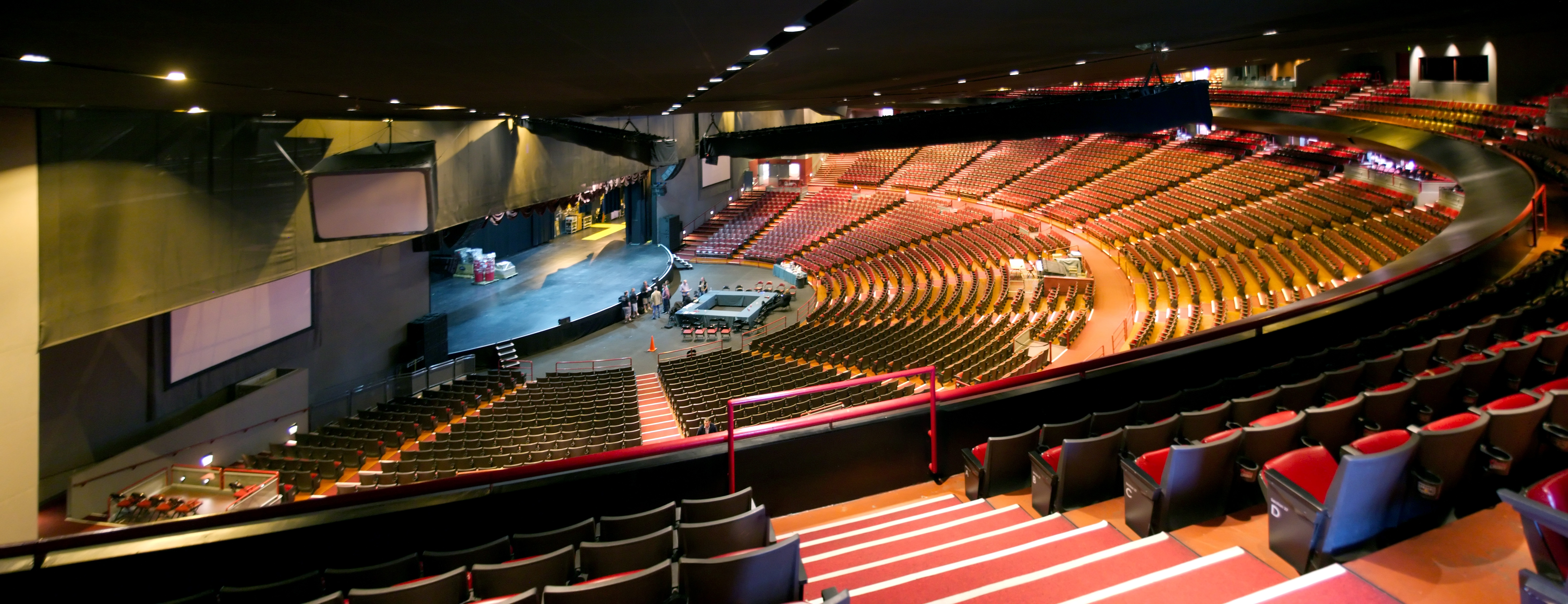
A panorama of Universal Amphitheatre in 2007

Capturing the band's stage show with a live album was designed to satisfy fans between new studio albums. The content of The Mark, Tom and Travis Show was recorded at two concerts in California. These shows—a part of the band's first arena outing, the Loserkids Tour—took place on November 4, 1999, at the Bill Graham Civic Auditorium in San Francisco, California, and November 5, 1999, at Universal Amphitheatre in Universal City, California. The album was titled after the band's 2000 worldwide tour, while the subtitle alludes to both Enema of the State and the Star Wars film The Empire Strikes Back. The recordings were captured by Le Mobile, a California-based mobile recording unit. Le Mobile has also recorded live albums for artists such as the Offspring, Van Morrison, Kenny G, and Robin Thicke.

Hoppus described the experience as daunting, especially the Los Angeles show: "Playing shows in LA is already nerve-wracking enough because you have friends and family and agents and lawyers and label people and radio stations," he told Rock Sound in 2020. The album was produced and mixed by Jerry Finn, a veteran punk rock producer that the band previously collaborated with on Enema of the State. Additional editing of the recordings took place at Signature Sound in the band's hometown, San Diego; Finn mixed the album at Cello Studios in Hollywood, where it was also finalized at Bernie Grundman Mastering. The album's artwork was illustrated by artist Glen Hanson, best known for later designing the Mattel fashion doll franchise Monster High. The drawing depicts the band performing for a colorful audience of characters, including a wizard, nude men, an alien, and Enema of the State cover model Janine Lindemulder. Hanson was awarded a certificate of excellence from the American Institute of Graphic Arts for his work on the sleeve. The design of the CD sleeve was headed by Tim Stedman, then vice president of the art department for MCA Records.

== Composition ==
=== Music ===
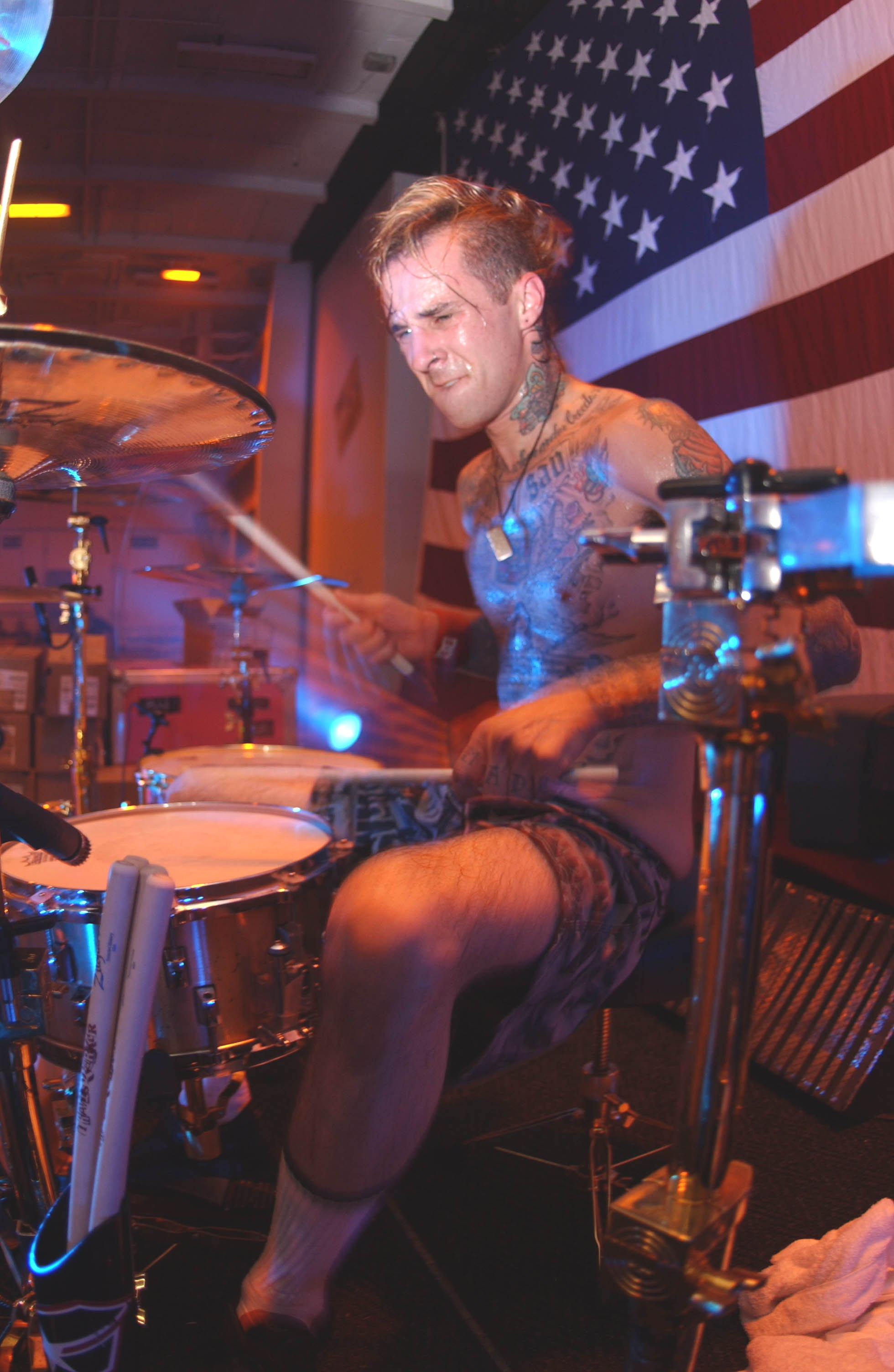
Drummer Travis Barker in 2003

The Mark, Tom, and Travis Show features live renditions of songs from the band's first three albums: Cheshire Cat, Dude Ranch, and Enema of the State. It leans heavily on the contents of the latter, as the band were touring in support of it at the time. Most of the songs are performed at a significantly faster tempo than the album versions. "We played the songs at lightning speed, and the dick jokes were at an all-time high. It was a perfect representation of what we sounded like and who we were at that time," Barker has recalled. The band's songs commonly focus on autobiographical lyrical subjects such as relationships, and adolescent themes like high school and teen angst. Greg Kot at the Chicago Tribune perceived an "undercurrent of seriousness and an attention to songcraft that might not be instantly apparent beneath the prankster veneer."

Guitarist Tom DeLonge's guitar riffs are down-stroked and power-chord heavy, with large amounts of palm muting, while Hoppus acts as a combination between a rhythm guitarist and bassist. Writer Greg Heller of Alternative Press, on the topic of Barker's role, observed that "In the great tradition of Cheap Trick's Live at Budokan, the [album] showcases the drummer's quiet fury—which is to say that when not drumming furiously, he's quiet [...] But when playing he's the loudmouth, squeezing fills into rolls with unthinkable technicality and brutal abandon." Heller felt that Barker's percussive work on the album offers "something slightly more eclectic" than the typical "repetitive blitzkrieg" of double-time punk drumming. At this point in his career, Barker listed veteran percussionists Steve Gadd, Dennis Chambers, and Stewart Copeland as influences. DeLonge and Hoppus, meanwhile, jokingly prioritize carelessness, remarking on the album that they "professionally suck."

At the conclusion of the live set, the album crossfades into "Man Overboard", a new studio track. The song was originally demoed during the sessions that produced Enema of the State, but was left off the final album. It lyrically references former drummer Scott Raynor, likening his expulsion from the group to an exclamation made when a passenger falls from a ship. The band wanted to include a new studio cover song as a bonus track, potentially from an artist like the Police, Phil Collins, or Paul Simon, but it was difficult to find time between their busy schedule.

=== Humor ===
The album contains a handful of juvenile joke songs, including "Family Reunion", a musical retelling of comedian George Carlin's seven dirty words routine, and "Blow Job", a celebration of oral sex. Throughout the performance, DeLonge and Hoppus alternate vocally portraying Satan through a voice changer, and parody their own lyrics. Nearly every song concludes with long, improvised repartee between the two musicians, often starting with DeLonge shouting "Hey Mark!" and punctuated by belching. "I always hated bands that just sit there and play," DeLonge said to disc jockey Michael Halloran. "I think us interacting with the audience is different, and original, and it's fun to do." The LP concludes with nearly eleven minutes of this collected banter, in which DeLonge references the duo's off-color tendency: "Hey, how come every time we say a joke, it has to be about fucking, sex, masturbation, incest, or anything gross like that? [...] There's nothing else to talk about!" These tracks, collectively known as "Words of Wisdom", are culled from DAT recordings of thirty shows across the Mark, Tom and Travis Show Tour, and were compiled by a member of band's entourage. Hoppus called it "the worst, most obscene, foul-language. On that tour me and Tom were really trying to see who could outdo the other and say the most ridiculous thing on stage." DeLonge expressed surprise at audience members' potential offense to their humor, noting that the scene the group came up in included acts like Guttermouth, whose frontman Mark Adkins was known to stick a drum stick up his rear on-stage—so their dialogue certainly felt tame in comparison.

Barker, who voted against including the 26-track collection of crosstalk, takes no part in the silliness, and communicates solely in rimshots. "Probably 60 percent of the time, what they're saying between songs is genuinely funny," he told Heller. "But the other times... that's when I'm kicking or doing something behind the drum set to say, 'Let's go. Let's play the next song.' They tried before [to get me involved]: 'Get a mic. Tell a joke.' But that's just not my style. I'd just rather play a song." This type of between-song dialogue has been compared to Paul Stanley's stage banter on the Kiss live album Alive!, as well as the Slayer bootleg album Do You Dig Older Women?. Allmusic reviewer MacKenzie Wilson dismissed this humor as "immature, [but] harmless." In contrast to their crude humor, the duo were fairly straight-laced behind-the-scenes, compared to many rockstars. A 2000 Rolling Stone profile by writer Gavin Edwards details the band: "They say they don't use drugs. Their tour rider mandates a supply of beer, which they routinely donate to the road crew. [...] Hoppus' and DeLonge's antics mask a mature streak that, given their fondness for fart jokes and references to one another's penises, in itself seems shocking." Nevertheless, the band's tendency to celebrate audience members flashing their breasts drew criticism. Hoppus responded to these critiques in the Rolling Stone story; "I just get super bummed-out when 13-year-old girls show their boobs. [...] Now, we're the first show for a lot of kids, so I just want them to have fun and get out safe."

== Commercial performance ==
The Mark, Tom, and Travis Show was first alluded to in an August 2000 article on MTV News, which reported the band were back in the studio to record a studio track accompanying the album, "Man Overboard". The song debuted online, streaming exclusively on MTV.com, KROQ.com and the band's official website on September 2, 2000. The song was later serviced to radio on September 18, where it quickly rose up Billboard's Modern Rock Tracks chart. The song peaked at number two on November 18, 2000, its eighth week on the chart, representing another hit single for the band. The live version of "Dumpweed" was also issued as a promotional single to support the album.

The Mark, Tom, and Travis Show was released on compact disc and cassette worldwide on November 7, 2000, with a suggested list price of $12.98 in the US. It was marketed as a limited edition release, and was only available for two months in stores. The album premiered with sales of between 110,000 and 128,000 copies, according to Nielsen SoundScan, debuting at number eight on the Billboard 200 chart in the issue dated November 25, 2000. It charted highest in Canada, where it peaked at number four, and in Australia, where it debuted on the ARIA Charts at number six. It was quickly certified gold in several regions; in Canada, the album was certified platinum by Music Canada for sales of over 100,000 copies; overseas, in the United Kingdom, it similarly attained 100,000 sales, resulting in a gold certification from the British Phonographic Industry.

It was certified gold by the Recording Industry Association of America on January 17, 2001, denoting shipments of over 500,000 copies.

== Critical reception ==
The Mark, Tom and Travis Show received mixed reviews from critics at the time of its release. At Metacritic, which assigns a normalized rating out of 100 to reviews from mainstream publications, the album received an average score of 56, based on eight reviews, indicating a "mixed or average" response. Wilson of Allmusic dubbed the album "a real rock show [and] high-speed energy at it's [sic] finest [...] in the midst of teen pop mediocrity and post-grunge rollickers, it's good to see a band such as blink-182 enjoying its time on top of the world." Alex Pappademas of Spin was appreciative of Hoppus and DeLonge's "smirky, self-deprecating one-liners [that] can't conceal the music's winning wistfulness." Rob Sheffield of Rolling Stone opined that "DeLonge is one terrific little guitar player, the comic chitchat interludes are a sweet bonus for fans, and Blink-182 steal enough moronic hooks to make The Enema Strikes Back! a hoot."

Mike Pace of PopMatters wrote that "the recording sounds bright and full, and while the suits at MCA surely had something to do with that production-wise, one can't fault Tom Delonge for coming into his own as a guitar player, and probably getting more mileage out of the C, G, A, F and G, C, D chord progressions than any band thus far." A reviewer for Melody Maker observed that the album "obeys the First Three Laws of Rock: have a good time; maintain the generation gap; keep it simple." The more negative reviews came from NME, with writer Siobhan Grogan deriding the album as "the tragic sound of three men so desperately trying to avoid growing up." Tom Sinclair, reviewing for Entertainment Weekly, found the collection to be "wholly unwarranted," criticizing the "laughably obvious" marketing strategy of "quickly flood[ing] the market with blink-182 product before their fans outgrow 'em." Retrospective reviews have since become more positive. Consequence of Sound contributor Alex Young retrospectively reviewed the album in 2008, praising the band's energy and considering it a part of that "timeless teenage tradition of offending parents and pushing the boundaries."

== Legacy and availability ==
The Mark, Tom, and Travis Show (The Enema Strikes Back!) proved influential to a generation of pop punk musicians. The New Jersey band Man Overboard named themselves after the album's lead single, while the members of Baltimore-based pop punk outfit All Time Low first bonded over listening to the album. Still, re-releases and availability of The Mark, Tom, and Travis Show have proven scarce. The original CD was only in stores for two months; it was pulled in January 2001. In the US, Universal Music Group first issued the album on vinyl in 2011 through mall chain Hot Topic, while Canadian independent label SRC reissued it on high-fidelity audiophile vinyl and cassette in 2015 and 2016. It has been infrequently available for digital download or on streaming services; in 2017, upon its latest removal, it prompted Man Overboard guitarist Zac Eisenstein to publicly bemoan its absence. It became re-available on Spotify and Apple Music in 2019, but only in certain regions.

== Track listing ==
All tracks are written by Mark Hoppus and Tom DeLonge, except where noted.

No.	Title	Writer(s)	Lead vocals	Length
1.	"Dumpweed"		DeLonge	2:53
2.	"Don't Leave Me"		Hoppus	2:38
3.	"Aliens Exist"		DeLonge	3:43
4.	"Family Reunion"		Hoppus	0:51
5.	"Going Away to College"		Hoppus	3:40
6.	"What's My Age Again?"		Hoppus	3:18
7.	"Dick Lips"	Hoppus; DeLonge; Scott Raynor	DeLonge	3:35
8.	"Blow Job"		DeLonge	0:41
9.	"Untitled"	Hoppus; DeLonge; Raynor	DeLonge	3:07
10.	"Voyeur"	Hoppus; DeLonge; Raynor	DeLonge	3:28
11.	"Pathetic"	Hoppus; DeLonge; Raynor	Hoppus; DeLonge	2:51
12.	"Adam's Song"		Hoppus	4:35
13.	"Peggy Sue"		DeLonge	3:47
14.	"Wendy Clear"		Hoppus	4:09
15.	"Carousel"		DeLonge	3:38
16.	"All the Small Things"		DeLonge	3:35
17.	"Mutt"		DeLonge	3:39
18.	"The Country Song"		DeLonge	1:00
19.	"Dammit"	Hoppus; DeLonge; Raynor	Hoppus; DeLonge	3:05
20.	"Man Overboard" (studio track)		Hoppus; DeLonge	2:46

- Track 7 and 8 are listed as "Rich Lips" and "Blew Job" on outside of case, respectively.

Parts for the hidden track "Shut Up and Play a Song" ^{(10:40)}
No.	Title	Length
21.	"Start My Own Nudist Colony"	0:23
22.	"Fuck Everybody Else"	0:38
23.	"Say Some Dirty Words"	0:34
24.	"I Like Your Hair"	0:09
25.	"For All the Ladies…"	0:21
26.	"Golf Tournament"	0:35
27.	"A Note from Your Mom"	0:16
28.	"What I Learned in Fifth Grade"	0:07
29.	"Fuck You Tom"	0:18
30.	"Smells Like Blood and Feces"	0:18
31.	"Safe Sex"	0:25
32.	"The Most Special Kind of Love"	0:27
33.	"My Boner Just Died"	0:11
34.	"Someone Lost a Contact Lens"	0:25
35.	"I Gotta Go Pee-Pee"	0:33
36.	"Hurt Kid"	0:17
37.	"I Wish I Took Guitar Lessons"	0:19
38.	"I Know a Guy"	0:42
39.	"Excuse Me, Security Guard"	0:22
40.	"Mark's Middle Name"	0:10
41.	"I Still Have to Go Pee"	0:10
42.	"You Shave Your Ass!"	0:35
43.	"We Need a New Guitarist"	0:17
44.	"If I Were a Girl"	0:05
45.	"Santa Will Rape Your Dogs"	0:14
46.	"I'm Ashamed to Be Myself"	0:22
47.	"Fuck Wiping!"	0:18
48.	"7up"	0:06
49.	"Last Words from Satan"	0:56
Total length:		71:32

== Personnel ==
Blink-182

- Mark Hoppus – vocals, bass guitar
- Tom DeLonge – vocals, guitar
- Travis Barker – drums

Production

- Jerry Finn – producer; mixing (all except "Man Overboard")
- Guy Charbonneau – engineer (all except "Man Overboard")
- Sean O'Dwyer – engineer on "Man Overboard"
- Tom Lord-Alge – mixing on "Man Overboard"
- Brian Gardner – mastering
- Charlie Bouis, Joe Marlett – assistant engineers

Artwork

- Tim Stedman – art direction, design
- TJ River – assisted design
- Glen Hanson – illustration
- Justin Stephens – photography
- Skye Hoppus (née Everly), Thomas Noto, Tim Stedman – additional photography

== Charts ==
=== Weekly charts ===
Chart (2000–2001)	Peak position
Australian Albums (ARIA)	6
Austrian Albums (Ö3 Austria)	38
Canadian Albums (Billboard)	4
French Albums (SNEP)	59
German Albums (Offizielle Top 100)	43
Italian Albums (FIMI)	27
Japanese Albums (Oricon)	77
New Zealand Albums (RMNZ)	10
Scottish Albums (Official Charts)	37
Swiss Albums (Schweizer Hitparade)	36
UK Albums (Official Charts)	69
US Billboard 200	8

=== Year-end charts ===
Chart (2000)	Position
Australian Albums (ARIA)	49
Canadian Albums (Nielsen SoundScan)	70
Chart (2001)	Position
US Billboard 200	144

== Certifications ==
Region	Certification	Certified units/sales
Australia (ARIA)	Platinum	70,000^{^}
Canada (Music Canada)	Platinum	100,000^{^}
New Zealand (RMNZ)	Gold	7,500^{^}
United Kingdom (BPI)	Gold	100,000^{‡}
United States (RIAA)	Gold	500,000^{^}
^{^} Shipments figures based on certification alone.^{‡} Sales+streaming figures based on certification alone.
