= Before We Met: A Collection of Old Songs =

Compilation album by Man Overboard
- Released: March 2, 2010
- Genre: Pop punk
- Length: 21:47
- Label: Panic

Man Overboard chronology
Split 7" with Transit (2009)	Before We Met: A Collection of Old Songs (2010)	Real Talk (2010)

Professional ratings
Review scores
Source	Rating
Punknews.org	2/5 stars

Before We Met: A Collection of Old Songs is a compilation by American rock band Man Overboard, released on March 2, 2010. It is composed of the five tracks from their initial EP Hung Up on Nothing and five other previously unreleased songs.

A couple of the new song titles were altered a little from their original names – "The Usual Results" has been renamed from "You Bitch (The Usual Results)", and "Top Eight" has been shortened from "I'm Taking You Out of My Top Eight".

The opening track, "Love Your Friends, Die Laughing", has been slightly remastered to give the acoustic guitars a 'bigger' sound, giving it more of a live sound in keeping with the ethos of the song.
Track 5, "Dude, Are You Kidding Me?", also has a marginally extended runtime (16 seconds) from its original length on Hung Up On Nothing, due to an added sound clip on the end of it.

Before We Met was reissued on January 7, 2013 on new vinyl pressings in gatefold form, CD, and cassette. The reissue features 5 extra tracks, which were previously unreleased demos. The demos are of tracks 2–5, and then 8.

== Track list ==
No.	Title	Length
1.	"Love Your Friends, Die Laughing"	2:21
2.	"Dreaming"	2:19
3.	"The Real You"	2:23
4.	"Disconnect"	2:14
5.	"Dude, Are You Kidding Me?"	3:01
6.	"Arlington Drive"	2:40
7.	"While You Were Sleeping"	2:03
8.	"In Orbit"	2:09
9.	"The Usual Results"	1:58
10.	"Top Eight"	2:41
Total length:		23:49

Deluxe Lost Tape Collective edition
No.	Title	Length
11.	"Dreaming" (demo)	2:20
12.	"The Real You" (demo)	2:13
13.	"Disconnect" (demo)	2:16
14.	"Dude Are You Kidding Me" (demo)	2:32
15.	"In Orbit" (demo)	2:05

== Personnel ==
Man Overboard

- Nik Bruzzese – vocals, bass
- Zac Eisenstein – vocals, guitar
- Wayne Wildrick – guitar, backing vocals
- Justin Collier – drums
