= Passing Ends =

EP by Man Overboard
- Released: October 27, 2014
- Length: 13:57
- Label: Lost Tape Collective, Rude
- Producer: Will Yip

Man Overboard chronology
Heart Attack (2013)	Passing Ends (2014)	Heavy Love (2015)

Passing Ends is a five-track EP from New Jersey–based rock band Man Overboard which was released on October 27, 2014, through Rude Records.

== Track listing ==
All music is composed by Man Overboard.

No.	Title	Length
1.	"Twenty Years"	2:27
2.	"Passing Ends"	2:51
3.	"Stood Up"	2:46
4.	"Secret Pain" (acoustic)	3:01
5.	"For Vince"	2:49
Total length:		13:56

== Personnel ==
- Zac Eisenstein – lead vocals, rhythm guitar, piano
- Nik Bruzzese – lead vocals, bass
- Wayne Wildrick – lead guitar, backing vocals
- Justin Collier – rhythm guitar, lead guitar, backing vocals
- Joe Talarico – drums
