= Polytechnic (band) =

British indie rock band

- Origin: Chorlton-cum-Hardy, Manchester, England
- Genres: Indie rock, Alternative rock
- Years active: 2005–2008
- Labels: Transgressive, Shatterproof
- Members: Dylan Giles; Yuri Caul; Peet Earnshaw; Tim Warren; Denny Hilton
- Website: http://www.Myspace.com/ukpolytechnic

Polytechnic were an English indie-rock band active in 2005–2008, based in Chorlton-cum-Hardy in Manchester.

== Members ==
Dylan Giles (vocal, guitar); Yuri Caul (bass); Tim Warren (drums); Denny Hilton (guitar); Peet Earnshaw (keyboards, backing vocals)

== History ==
Originally a two-piece composed of two schoolfriends from Totnes in Devon, vocalist and guitarist Dylan Giles and bassist Yuri Caul, the band was known as The Conversation (named after the 1974 Francis Ford Coppola movie) and had been playing fairly low-key gigs in Manchester for a couple of years until Eastbourne native and drummer Tim "The Lord Stuchbury" Warren joined the band in late 2004.

Moving slightly away from the krautrock-inflected, acoustic style of music Warren had described as "heroin music", The Conversation played for a few months as a three-piece (this time for under the name Audition – again taken from a Miike Takashi movie) in early 2005, recording demos in Yuri's bedroom. These early demos featured versions of future favourites such as "Running Out of Ideas" and "Pep".

In March 2005, again playing as The Conversation, a second guitarist was added to the line-up, debuting at the Sexy Rest acoustic band night at Fuel in Withington, Manchester. Denny Hilton, originally from Stoke-on-Trent, had returned to Manchester after a few months living in Berlin, taking part in an improvised backing band for the former Can vocalist Damo Suzuki alongside the members of Manchester band The Nightjars.

More gigs followed across Manchester until a dispute over the name The Conversation with a Warrington-based group lead to a name change once more in June, this time to Polytechnic, rumoured to be the suggestion of local author and performer Edward Barton. The band narrowly decided against being known as Pep, the title of their most popular tune at the time.

Soon after, two influential gigs did a great deal to bring Polytechnic to a wider audience. Firstly, in July, a weekend festival organised by local promoters Blowout at the Southern Pub in Chorlton raised their profile in the city and pricked the attention of various record labels, and then in October 2005, another Blowout gig as part of Manchester's In the City seminar brought them to the attention of Radio 1's Steve Lamacq, who began to play their bedroom-recorded "Pep" demo on his Radio 1 and 6 Music shows and mentioned them as one of his favourite bands of the moment in the NME.

A last minute gig supporting The Subways at Manchester Academy meant the first official appearance of the fifth member of the group, keyboardist Peet Earnshaw, who also provides backing vocals. Peet (from Durham) had been rehearsing with Polytechnic for a few months after leaving Withington-based band, The Generalissimos. He had become friends with Dylan and Yuri two years earlier at an open mic night in Withington after they bonded over a shared love of film director Wes Anderson.

National tours with The Longcut and Doves followed before the end of the year and a support slot for The Breeders with the band beginning to appear in national music press.

== Growing reputation ==
Polytechnic saw in the new year with a support slot for The Strokes at Manchester Apollo, which further heightened expectation around the band, followed by tours with Morning Runner and Nine Black Alps and a live session with Steve LeMacq's 6 Music show.

A singles record deal with Transgressive Records was signed early in 2006, which resulted in the first single being released in April 2006, a "double b-side" of "Won't You Come Around?"/"Let Me Down". This coincided with the band's first national headline tour and a handful of appearances at the SXSW conference in Austin, Texas, where they were described by Tony Wilson as "the second best band in Manchester (after The Longcut)" at the XFM Manchester showcase. The limited edition single sold out within days.

After the inclusion of "Let Me Down" on an Artrocker magazine cover-mount, Polytechnic's second single for Transgressive was released in July 2006, the live favourite "Pep". This was coupled with another live tour and several appearances at festivals across the country, including the Leeds Carling festival and Manchester's own D-Percussion, where the band signed their first album deal with Shatterproof, a local independent label.

In the autumn, the band repaired to Bryn Derwen studios, near Bethesda in north Wales to begin work on their debut long-player. A tour with Transgressive label-mates The Young Knives followed, after which Polytechnic toured Ireland for the first time, before the release of their third single, and the first for Shatterproof, "Man Overboard" in December.

This single saw them build their fanbase with Single of the Week in both NME and The Sun.

A fourth single, "Cold-Hearted Business", was released in February 2007, and their debut album, Down Til Dawn, hit the shelves in April. In addition to the previous singles, "Bible Stories" was frequently picked out as the stand-out track on the collection. A b-side of The Shins' "Australia" single, also released in April on Transgressive, featured Polytechnic covering "Caring Is Creepy", taken from the "Oh, Inverted World!" album. They then went on to support The Shins, as well as going on an Arena tour supporting Keane and a joint headline tour with their friend and landlord Cherry Ghost.

On 14 November 2007, Polytechnic played their first Los Angeles show at Spaceland in Silver Lake, and then their first New York show two days later at The Mercury Lounge, as they slowly build up fans and support state-side.

At the end of 2007, they parted company with their guitarist Denny Hilton, and finally disbanded entirely in the summer of 2008. Dylan, Yuri and Peet have since gone on to form a new band called Driver Drive Faster, which released their debut single "They May Talk" through Lex Records on 23 February 2010. An album is set to be released in the summer of 2010.

== Discography ==
Albums:

- Down Til Dawn – Shatterproof – April 2007

Singles:

- "Loose Tongues" (EP) (as Audition) – demo – February 2005
  - Tracks: Loose Tongues, Let Me Down, Someone To Interfere, Fingertips
- "Running Out of Ideas" (EP) (as The Conversation) – demo – June 2005
  - Tracks: Let Me Down, Running Out of Ideas, Still Spinning, Bargepole
- "Pep" (EP) – demo – October 2005
  - Tracks: Pep, Penguin, Running Out of Ideas
- "Won't You Come Around?" / "Let Me Down" (double a-side 7" and 3" CD) – Transgressive – April 2006
- "Pep" (two 7" singles) – Transgressive – July 2006
  - b/w "Headshaker" / "Still Spinning"
- "Man Overboard" (7" single) – Shatterproof – December 2006
  - b/w "Fingertips"
- "Cold Hearted Business" (7" single) – Shatterproof – February 2007
  - b/w "Penguin" / "Let Me Down" (Acoustic)

Other releases

- "Pep" (CD Compilation) – Transgressive – December 2006
  - NME Compilation
- "Caring Is Creepy" (7" b-side) – Transgressive – April 2007
  - Cover version for The Shins single "Australia"
