= Hung Up on Nothing =

EP by Man Overboard
- Released: August 26, 2008
- Recorded: August 2008, Cannon Found Soundation Studios, Small Hill Studios
- Length: 12:00
- Label: Self-released
- Producer: Jesse Cannon, Nik Bruzzese

Man Overboard chronology
Hung Up on Nothing (2008)	Dahlia (2009)

Hung Up on Nothing is the debut EP by New Jersey rock band Man Overboard.

== Background and release ==
Professional ratings
Review scores
Source	Rating
Absolutepunk.net	6.4/10
Punknews.org	2.5/5 stars

Man Overboard was founded in 2008 by vocalist/bassist Nik Bruzzese and lead guitarist Wayne Wildrick when the pair were writing songs at Bruzzese's Small Hill Studio. Wildrick brought in The Front Page member Zac Eisenstein to play on vocals and guitar, and Bangarang! member Justin Mondshcein to play drums. The group then went to work on what would be their first release, Hung Up on Nothing. The group shut themselves off in the studio and demoed close to 60 songs. The band went to record Hung Up on Nothing in August with producer Jesse Cannon. The EP was released on August 26, as a free download. The band soon toured across the U.S. In late 2009 the band signed to Run for Cover. The EP was pressed physically for the first time since its first release in May 2014 on vinyl and cassette.

== Track list ==
1. "Love Your Friends, Die Laughing" – 2:20
2. "Dreaming" – 2:19
3. "The Real You" – 2:23
4. "Disconnect" – 2:14
5. "Dude, Are You Kidding Me?" – 2:45

== Personnel ==
Personnel per sleeve.

Man Overboard

- Nik Bruzzesse – vocals, bass
- Zac Eisenstein – vocals, guitar
- Wayne Wildrick – guitar

Additional musician

- Dan Fithian – drums

Production

- Jesse Cannon – producer, engineer, mixing on all tracks except "Love Your Friends, Die Laughing"
- Mike Oettinger – engineer on all tracks except "Love Your Friends, Die Laughing"
- Nik Bruzzesse – engineer, mixing on "Love Your Friends, Die Laughing"
- Perry Shall – cover
- Arron Webber – photography
