= Driver Drive Faster =

UK musical group

- Origin: Chorlton-cum-Hardy, Manchester, England
- Genres: Indie rock, alternative rock
- Years active: 2008–present
- Label: Lex Records
- Members: Dylan Giles; Yuri Caul; Peet Earnshaw; David Schlechtriemen
- Website: http://www.Myspace.com/driverdrivefaster

Driver Drive Faster are a rock/indie band from Chorlton-cum-Hardy, Manchester, England.

After the demise of their previous band, Polytechnic, in the winter of 2008, Dylan, Peet and Yuri locked themselves away in a makeshift studio above a tanning salon in Chorlton, and began writing and recording new material. They built up a significant back catalogue of songs, and in the Spring of 2009 recruited the drumming talents of German born David and started gigging around Manchester and London. Since then they have supported acts such as The Aliens, Japandroids, Erland and The Carnival, The Drums and ex-Pavement's Marble Valley. They have received strong support from BBC radio 6 DJs Marc Riley and Steve Lamacq, as well as Radio 2's Radcliffe & Maconie show. In February 2010, DDF released their debut single 'They May Talk' through Lex Records, along with remixes of the song by The Young Knives and Manchester's May68.

The band released their debut album on Manchester based label Akoustik Anarkhy in the spring of 2011.

== Members ==
- Dylan Giles (vox, guitar)
- Yuri Caul (bass)
- Peet Earnshaw (keyboards, backing vocals)
- David Schlechtriemen (drums)

== Discography ==
=== Singles ===
- "They May Talk" (Single/EP) - Lex Records
  - Included Remixes by May68, The Young Knives and Pariah.
  - Plus b-side "The Lookout".

=== Albums ===
- Open House - Akoustik Anarkhy
