= Pop Punks Not Dead Tour =

2011 concert tour by New Found Glory

Pop Punk's Not Dead Tour
- Tour by New Found Glory
- Location: United States; United Kingdom
- Start date: October 6, 2011
- End date: November 20, 2011
- No. of shows: 37
- Website: newfoundglory.com

The Pop Punk's Not Dead Tour was a concert tour headlined by American rock band New Found Glory. The initial US leg was sponsored by Rockstar energy drink, with the band supported by Set Your Goals, The Wonder Years, Man Overboard, and This Time Next Year. The band wanted to showcase young talent from within the pop punk scene, following in the footsteps of bands such as Less Than Jake, Blink-182 and Green Day, who had in turn helped them out by offering support roles early in their career. It was announced on 1 August 2011 that the tour would commence on 6 October in Santa Cruz, California, running through 20 November in San Diego following the release of the band's seventh studio album Radiosurgery. AbsolutePunk ran an exclusive competition on their website, with five pairs of free tickets available for the tour including a meet-and-greet with the band back stage. During the band's stint on the 2012 Kerrang! Tour, it was announced they would be bringing the tour to UK shores later in the year.

== Support acts ==
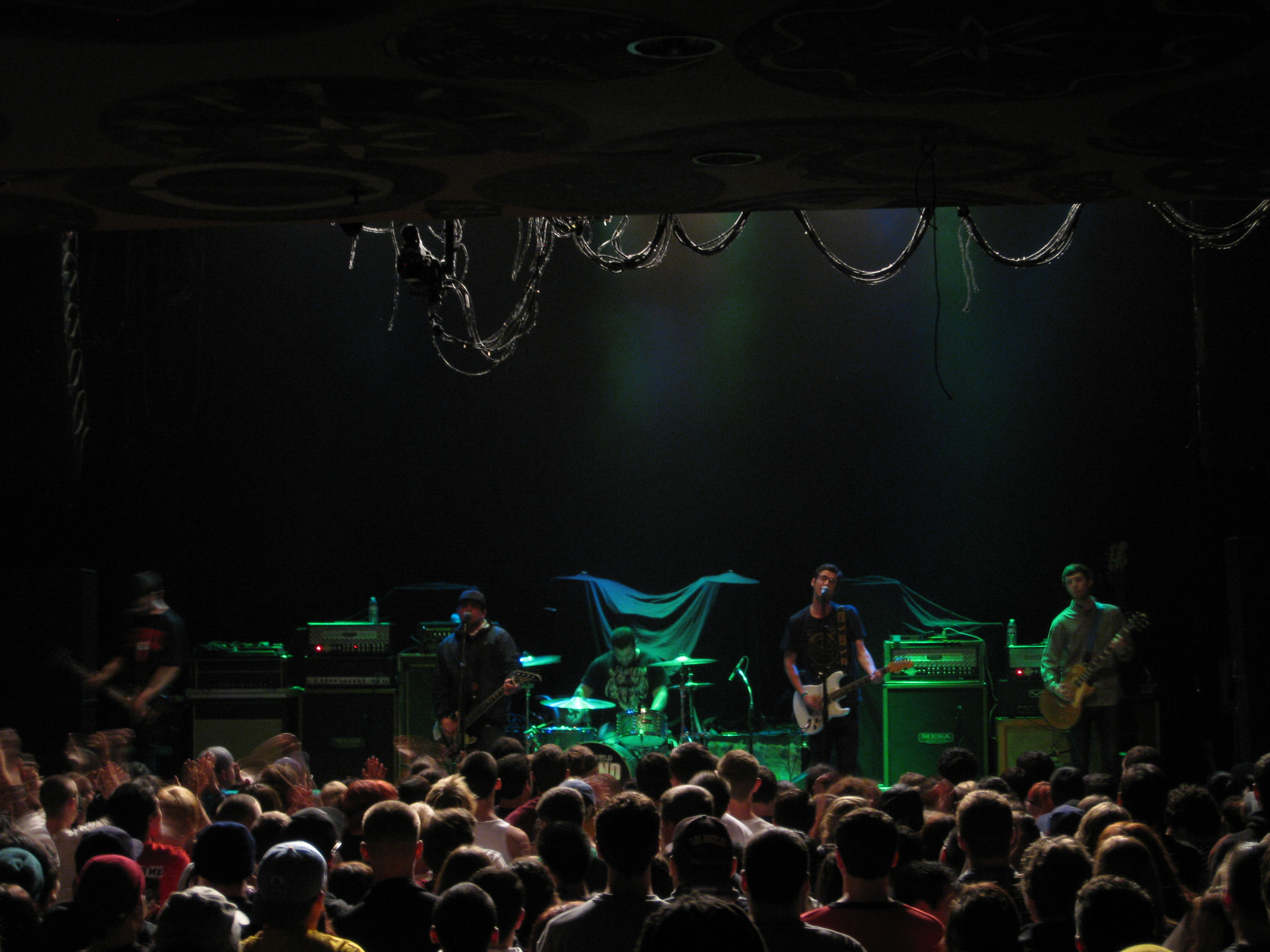
Man Overboard in 2011

=== United States ===
- Set Your Goals
- The Wonder Years
- Man Overboard
- This Time Next Year

=== United Kingdom ===
- The Story So Far
- Candy Hearts
- Only Rivals
- State Champs

== Dates ==
The Pop Punks Not Dead Tour has thus far featured 37 tour stops in the United States.

Date	City	Country	Venue
October 6, 2011	Santa Cruz	United States	The Catalyst
October 7, 2011	Los Angeles	United States	House of Blues
October 8, 2011	Tempe	United States	The Marquee
October 10, 2011	Dallas	United States	Trees
October 11, 2011	Austin	United States	Emo's East
October 12, 2011	Houston	United States	Fitzgerald's
October 14, 2011	Atlanta	United States	The Masquerade
October 15, 2011	Orlando	United States	House of Blues
October 16, 2011	Fort Lauderdale	United States	Revolution
October 17, 2011	St. Peterburg	United States	Jannus Live
October 19, 2011	Charleston	United States	The Music Farm
October 20, 2011	Charlotte	United States	Amos' Southend Music Hall
October 21, 2011	Richmond	United States	The National
October 22, 2011	Philadelphia	United States	Electric Factory
October 23, 2011	Baltimore	United States	Rams Head Live!
October 25, 2011	Buffalo	United States	Town Ballroom
October 26, 2011	Syracuse	United States	Lost Horizon
October 27, 2011	Boston	United States	House of Blues
October 28, 2011	New York City	United States	Best Buy Theater
October 29, 2011	Sayreville	United States	Starland Ballroom
October 31, 2011	Pittsburgh	United States	Altar Bar
November 1, 2011	Cleveland	United States	House of Blues
November 3, 2011	Royal Oak	United States	Royal Oak Music Theatre
November 4, 2011	Chicago	United States	House of Blues
November 5, 2011	Saint Paul	United States	Station 4
November 6, 2011	Iowa City	United States	The Blue Moose Tap House
November 8, 2011	St. Louis	United States	The Pageant
November 9, 2011	Kansas City	United States	Midland Theatre
November 10, 2011	Denver	United States	Ogden Theatre
November 11, 2011	Salt Lake City	United States	The Grand - The Complex
November 13, 2011	Seattle	United States	Showbox at the Market
November 14, 2011	Portland	United States	Wonder Ballroom
November 16, 2011	San Francisco	United States	The Regency Ballroom
November 17, 2011	Anaheim	United States	House of Blues
November 18, 2011	Anaheim	United States	House of Blues
November 19, 2011	Las Vegas	United States	Hard Rock Cafe
November 20, 2011	San Diego	United States	House of Blues

== See also ==
- List of punk rock festivals
