= Handguns (band) =

American pop punk band

- Origin: Harrisburg, Pennsylvania, United States
- Genres: Pop punk, rock
- Years active: 2008–present
- Labels: Pass Along Knowledge Yourself, Pure Noise, Marco Rules Records
- Members: Jake Langley; Nate Bobb; Marco Florey; Zach Hensely
- Past members: Taylor Eby; Thomas Rory McGrath; Kevin Cale; Joshua Hurst; Adam Fields; Brandon Gepfer; Cody Bunce; Colin Scull; Woody Spokas; Brandon Pagano; C.J. Wilson; Kyle Vaught; Ryan Pyle
- Website: Handguns on Facebook

Handguns is an American pop punk band originally from Harrisburg, Pennsylvania and later based in Baltimore but now they are scattered. The Singer lives in Kentucky, the drummer lives in Philly and Nate and Jake still live in the Harrisburg area .

== History ==
Blending emo and pop punk, the band self-released three EPs before signing to Pure Noise Records in 2011, the label releasing fourth EP Don't Bite Your Tongue that year. Their debut album, Angst, was released on September 25, 2012, on Pure Noise Records. Handguns toured Japan in December 2012 and toured Europe in Spring 2013 with Senses Fail. The band's second album, Life Lessons, was released in 2014. Handguns played all of the Vans Warped tour in the summer of 2013 and 2015. Their next album was titled Disenchanted, and released in November 2015. A review in Exclaim! described it as "underwhelming", with the band "stuck in a rut". In a more positive review of the album, Connor Welsh of New Transcendence called the album "a relevant and relatable release for honestly, just about everyone."

By 2012 all of the original members had left, and the band had undergone multiple changes of personnel. On October 6, 2017, at a show in Carlisle, Pennsylvania, the band announced that the 2010 line up were reuniting to record a new album together on their record label Pass Along Knowledge Yourself and play some shows. Following that, the band embarked on the 'When The Tour Burns Out' tour in support of their album When The Light Burns Out with comedian Ron "Cheesefoot" Smith.

They released an EP titled OUT THE MUD in 2025, which is the first release to feature Zach Hensely on vocals after the departure of longtime frontman Taylor Eby. With no plans of slowing down, lead guitarist Jake Langley began an intensive year long acoustic tour in 2026 while subsequent full band shows followed. They have toured with bands such as Man Overboard, The Wonder Years, Dead Cheetos, Jazz Hog, Parade Wave, Forever Came Calling and Roam.

== Members ==
Current

- Zach Hensley - lead vocals (2024–present)
- Jake Langley - lead guitar, backing vocals (2008–2012, 2017–present)
- Nate Bobb - bass guitar, backing vocals (2008–2012, 2017–present)
- Marco Florey - drums, percussion (2008–2011, 2017–present)

Former

- Joshua Hurst - lead vocals (2008)
- Adam Fields - drums (2008)
- Brandon Gepfer - lead vocals (2008–2009)
- Cody Bunce - bass guitar (2008–2009)
- Kevin Cale - lead guitar (2011)
- Taylor Eby - lead vocals (2010–2025)
- Woody Spokas - drums, percussion (2012–2014)
- Brandon Pagano - lead guitar, backing vocals (2012–2017)
- Kyle Vaught - rhythm guitar, backing vocals (2012–2017)
- C.J. Wilson - bass guitar, backing vocals (2012–2017)
- Ryan Pyle - drums, percussion (2014–2017)

*Austin Weaver - drums, percussion (touring) (2024-2025)

== Discography ==
Studio albums

- Angst (Pure Noise, 2012) U.S. #155
- Life Lessons (Pure Noise, 2014)
- Disenchanted (Pure Noise, 2015)
- When The Light Burns Out (PAKY/Penultimate Records, 2020)

Extended plays

- Demo 2008 (PAKY, 2008)
- MMIX Summer Tour EP (PAKY, 2009)
- Anywhere But Home (PAKY, 2010)
- Don't Bite Your Tongue (Pure Noise, 2011)
- Split 7" with 'Forever Came Calling' (Pure Noise, 2011)
- OUT THE MUD (Handguns Productions, 2025)
