= Adam's Song =

2000 single by Blink-182

Single by Blink-182

from the album Enema of the State
- Released: March 2000
- Recorded: January–March 1999
- Studio: Signature Sound, Studio West (San Diego, California); Mad Hatter, the Bomb Factory (Los Angeles, California); Conway Recording (Hollywood, California); Big Fish (Encinitas, California)
- Genre: Pop-punk; alternative rock; emo
- Length: 4:09
- Label: MCA
- Songwriters: Mark Hoppus; Tom DeLonge
- Producer: Jerry Finn

Blink-182 singles chronology
"All the Small Things" (1999)	"Adam's Song" (2000)	"Man Overboard" (2000)

"Adam's Song" is a song recorded by the American rock band Blink-182 for their third studio album, Enema of the State (1999). It was released as the third and final single from Enema of the State in March 2000, through MCA Records. "Adam's Song" shares writing credits between the band's guitarist Tom DeLonge and bassist Mark Hoppus, but Hoppus was the primary composer of the song. The track contains themes of suicide, depression and loneliness. It incorporates a piano in its bridge section and was regarded as one of the most serious songs the band had written to that point.

Hoppus was inspired by the loneliness he experienced while on tour; while his bandmates had significant others to return home to, he was single. He was also influenced by a teen suicide letter he read in a magazine. The song takes the form of a suicide note, and contains lyrical allusions to the Nirvana song "Come as You Are". "Adam's Song" was one of the last songs to be written and recorded for Enema of the State, and it was nearly left off the album. Though Hoppus worried the subject matter was too depressing, his bandmates were receptive to its message. The song was produced by Jerry Finn.

"Adam's Song" peaked at number two on the US Billboard Hot Modern Rock Tracks chart; it was also a top 25 hit in Canada and Italy, but did not replicate its success on other charts. It received praise from music critics, who considered it a change of pace from the trio's more lighthearted singles. The single's music video, a hit on MTV, was directed by Liz Friedlander. Though the song was intended to inspire hope to those struggling with depression, it encountered controversy when a student survivor of the Columbine High School massacre died by suicide with the track playing on repeat in 2000.

== Background ==
Blink-182 first rose to prominence in the late 1990s with their high-energy onstage hijinks and peppy pop-punk sound. In 1997, they released their second album Dude Ranch, which, with its anthem "Dammit", helped the band break through to a mainstream audience. Blink were among the first groups to play Warped Tour, a traveling exhibition darting across America bringing skateboarding and punk culture to the masses. While they had only played select dates on the previous year’s outing, the band were scheduled for every date on the 1997 version, on top of other tour dates around the world. This exhausting schedule exacerbated personal tensions between the trio.

The tours could be exhilarating but lonely for the members of the band: "When we did our longest tour stretch, it was right when I started dating my [future wife]," recalled vocalist/guitarist Tom DeLonge. "We were all new and in love, and I had to leave. It was just, 'Hey, I'll see you in nine months.' It was really hard." Bassist/vocalist Mark Hoppus, meanwhile, had a different outlook—while his bandmates returned home to long-term partners, he was single. "I was lonely on tour, but then I got home and it didn't matter because there was nothing there for me anyway," he confided to Rolling Stone in 2000. These feelings were compounded with the fact that the band were reaching professional highs—by 1998, Dude Ranch had gone gold and the band were on the verge of stardom. It made it doubly complicated — while struggling with depression, Hoppus felt as though he had "too much good fortune to complain about anything."

Settling down after a long tour could be abrupt, and emotionally jarring. Hoppus describes this malaise in a passage from his 2025 memoir:

The end of tour is like the end of a roller-coaster ride. The air brakes hit and you’re thrown forward against the restraints, flung into the station and everything stops. Fun’s over. Back to reality. But what is reality? For me, a quiet, empty bedroom in a quiet, empty house. On tour, I was constantly surrounded by people, traveling the world, playing music with my best friends. Nonstop motion, new faces every day. But when I came home it suddenly hit me that I was very alone. I didn’t have anyone to share the experience with. Tom had a serious girlfriend waiting for him, but I came back to a big house where I passed the time in my room alone. After a few tours, I threw down my suitcase, sat on my bed, and just cried.

== Writing and development ==
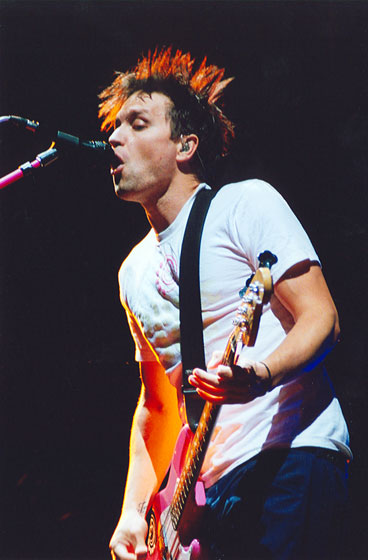
Bassist Mark Hoppus, the song's lyricist, was inspired by a teen suicide note as well as touring-related loneliness.

The development of "Adam's Song" came quickly and privately for Hoppus. He wrote the tune on acoustic guitar in the living room of his first home, scribbling its lyrics on hotel stationery from San Francisco's Hotel Richelieu. At the time, he characterized himself as "deeply depressed," and struggling with suicidal ideation. The song begins with the narrator contemplating suicide with the lyrics "I never thought I'd die alone." The lyrics continue: "I'm too depressed to go on / You'll be sorry when I'm gone." Some lyrics deal directly with his feelings of post-tour isolation: the couplet "I couldn't wait til I got home/To pass the time in my room alone" originally ended "to get off the plane alone." Other lyrics have more visceral, personal connections for him. The line "Remember the time that I spilled the cup / of apple juice in the hall" stems from his childhood memories. As a boy, he once overheard his parents arguing behind closed doors, and while listening, accidentally knocked over a cup of juice he had been drinking—revealing his presence and that he had been eavesdropping. "Adam’s Song" also contains an allusion to Nirvana's “Come as You Are". Whereas Nirvana’s lyric reads, "Take your time, hurry up, the choice is yours, don’t be late," Blink-182’s song echoes it with the line, "I took my time, I hurried up, the choice was mine, I didn't think enough."

Additionally, the song drew inspiration from a magazine article Hoppus had read and found harrowing, about a student who had killed himself and left a note for his parents. Online rumors purported that the song was inspired by a friend from Hoppus' high school years who took his own life, or a play titled Adam's Letter (2005) that has the same focus, but was not written until years after the song's release. John Cosper, the writer behind Adam's Letter, said, "the naming of the central character was a coincidence. The name goes back to the original script; I had no knowledge of Blink-182 or their music at that time." In his memoir Can I Say, drummer Travis Barker wrote that the song's title was taken from a "sketch on Mr. Show about a band [Titannica] that writes a song with that name encouraging one particular fan to kill himself." David Cross, co-creator of Mr. Show, confirmed this, commenting, "They were fans of the show and that was a knowing tribute that I thought was pretty cool."

Altogether, Hoppus viewed "Adam's Song" as a creative breakthrough. Writing it helped him overcome coming to grips with the fact that he struggled with depression and anxiety, and perhaps always had. He also felt something otherworldly about its creation, feeling as though he had leveled up in songwriting from nowhere: "[It] came together like a dream. Lightning in a bottle, a creation that felt beyond my ability as an artist. One of those rare moments where the song was always there waiting for me."

== Recording and production ==
"Adam's Song" was among the last tracks composed and recorded for Enema of the State, and was nearly absent from the final album. The band was halfway finished with recording when Hoppus developed the idea. Though he worried it was "a bit too far and depressing for what we were trying to do," his bandmates were receptive towards the idea. "I remember the day I played ["Adam's Song"] for Tom and Travis, and they were like, 'Wow, that's a pretty heavy song. It's really good,'" he said in 2000. At the same time, the song stands in contrast to the album's otherwise high-energy hijinks and lighthearted tone: "It felt weird to have an album full of youthful exuberance and chicks and parties with one song thrown in that makes you want to call a hotline," Hoppus joked.

Hoppus procrastinated on recording vocals for the song throughout much of the recording process of the album, and he waited until everything else was nearly complete to finally get around to singing the part. He recalled tracking the part while wearing sunglasses indoors, joking with producer Jerry Finn about Offspring singer Dexter Holland’s frequent use of shades. Although vocals would usually take many alternate takes to complete, Hoppus completed much of the vocal track for "Adam's Song" in a single take. "It's in a pretty high register for me, so I just blasted it out one night after dinner. That's, like, 90 percent of what's on the final track," he told Kerrang!. The idea to include piano in the track came without much forethought; "We realized, 'Well, this part here could sound rad if we put piano in here.' So we tried it out, and it sounded rad," said Hoppus. The piano was performed by session musician Roger Joseph Manning, Jr., best known for his work with Beck.

== Composition ==
"Adam's Song"
A sampling of the song's second verse, illustrating the song's suicidal lyrics and Barker's drum pattern

"Adam's Song" was a departure from the content of the band's previous singles, in favor of a slower tempo and more contemplative lyrics. Brian Wallace of MTV wrote that Blink-182 "explores new ground on "Adam's Song," setting aside their normal pop-punk punch for a more emo-influenced approach." While other songs by the band are bracingly fast, Stereogum contributor Jeff Yeager said the song had more in common with the Cure, another of the trio's primary influences. The song is an emo, pop punk, and alternative rock track composed in the key of C major and is set in time signature of common time with a tempo of 136 beats per minute. Hoppus' vocal range spans from G_{3} to G_{4}.

Barker's drum track was labeled by Drummerworld as "one of the most creative beats of his career," and mainly consists of the same basic beat repeated in sections throughout the verses. The first measure begins with the kick drum and splash cymbal playing on the downbeat, followed by a hit on the bell of the ride cymbal on the "and" of beat two, preceding an open hi-hat that rings out for a full count on beat three. "The kick, snare, and floor tom are all hit simultaneously on beat four, followed by floor tom hits on the last two sixteenth-note triplets of beat four." The snare is hit on beats two and four, respectively. The song "gradually builds to a powerful, piano-laden crescendo," and the song's final chorus and conclusion take a more uplifting view of the world: "Tomorrow holds such better days / Days when I can still feel alive/ When I can't wait to get outside." DeLonge noted that over six guitar parts were recorded for the "gigantic, sad" choruses, but upon mixing, only four were used. "The extra ones didn't really do anything besides make it a little more unclear what was going on."

== Commercial performance ==
"Adam's Song" was mainly a commercial success in the United States, but it was a top 25 hit in Canada and Italy as well. In the US, it debuted on Billboard's Modern Rock Tracks chart at number 38 in the issue dated March 18, 2000. Over the following weeks, it gradually ascended the chart to a peak of number two in the issue dated April 29. It remained at that position for seven weeks, held off the top position by "Otherside" by the Red Hot Chili Peppers, and "Kryptonite" by 3 Doors Down. On May 13, the single peaked at number one on the Bubbling Under the Hot 100 chart. In CMJ New Music Report, a trade magazine that contained exclusive charts of non-commercial and college radio airplay and independent and trend-forward retail sales, "Adam's Song" was a number one hit on their Commercial Alternative Cuts chart in the issue dated May 15, 2000. The song made its sole appearance on Billboard's Hot 100 Airplay chart on that same date, peaking at number 79. The song's last appearance on the Modern Rock Tracks chart came on September 9, 2000; as a whole, it spent 26 weeks on the chart. In the Billboard issue for July 19, 2003, Nielsen Broadcast Data Systems recognized the single with the BDS Certified Award for 100,000 radio spins. The song later made an appearance on Billboard's Rock Digital Songs at position 38 shortly after the release of the band's sixth album, Neighborhoods, in October 2011.

In Canada, the single debuted on the Rock Report chart, compiled by RPM, on May 15, 2000, at number 26. Over the ensuing weeks, its position fluctuated, but it reached a peak of number 20 on June 12, 2000. It last appeared on the chart on July 24 at number 29 before dropping out. In Italy, the single reached a peak of number 21 and spent three weeks on the charts. In New Zealand, the song reached a peak of number 39 and spent six weeks on the chart, while in Germany, the single fared poorly, spending only one week and reaching a peak of 98. Although the song did not chart in the United Kingdom, the British Phonographic Industry (BPI) awarded the song a silver certification in October 2021 for sales and streams of over 200,000 units.

== Critical reception ==
"Adam's Song" is generally considered one of the band's more serious songs, one "that hints at the emotional maturity they'd show on later releases," particularly their eponymous 2003 release. Richard Harrington of The Washington Post deemed the song "a powerful exploration of exhaustion and depression." Alex Pappademas, writing for Spin, compared the song to the music of Weezer. Katy Kroll of Billboard recognized it among her top 10 singles of 2000, calling it "a good old-fashioned depressing song with mainstream flair." Geoff Boucher, writing for the Los Angeles Times, called it "a poignant essay on a teen mulling over suicide"; conversely, Steve Appleford of the Los Angeles Times dubbed it a "moving if unremarkable examination." Scott Mervis of the Pittsburgh Post-Gazette called it a "rare departure from the usual Blink fare."

Several commentators have called "Adam's Song" deeply important. Pitchfork's Jeremy Gordon called it the "most impactful anti-suicide song of the '90s," calling it "stunning [...] 'Adam’s Song' read like something a teenager might have written, which is why millions of them loved it. The experience of navigating suicidal feelings rarely sounded so anthemic." Stereogum's Jeff Yeager called it the most significant song on the album, its mid-album sequencing the equivalent of "burying the lede" in journalism. He analyzed its "spirit" as beautifully naive, true to its teenage tone: "On the darkest song of the album lay the true value of youth: the wide-eyed belief in a new tomorrow." Writers for The A.V. Club listed it among other suicide-related songs in 2009, describing it as "surprisingly affecting, especially when the band reaches the bombastic chorus, and when the song describes suicide's crushing aftermath." In a retrospective review, Chris Payne of Billboard wrote, "Stylistically, it's also a Blink breakthrough: rather than putting their heads down and plowing through at breakneck speed, the band dials back the verses and interludes to let them breathe a bit."

In 2016, Stereogum ranked the song number two on their list of the 10 greatest Blink-182 songs, and in 2022, Kerrang ranked the song number five on their list of the 20 greatest Blink-182 songs.

== Suicide of Greg Barnes ==
The song caused a controversy in 2000 when it was set to replay indefinitely on a nearby stereo as 17-year-old Greg Barnes, a teenager who attended Columbine High School and had lost one of his best friends in the massacre the previous year, hanged himself in the garage of his family's home. Both Hoppus and DeLonge were sympathetic but stressed the song's meaning during an MTV News interview in 2001:

Hoppus: "I was actually out shopping, and management called me up and told me the story of what happened, and I was like, 'But that's an anti-suicide song!' It felt awful. I mean, the things that the kid had had to go through in his life were very saddening, and then to end it that way was really depressing. But 'Adam's Song', the heart of the song is about having hard times in your life, being depressed, and going through a difficult period, but then finding the strength to go on and finding a better place at the other side of that." DeLonge: "It affected us really strongly because that song was a song of hope. When we were writing it, we knew specifically that we did not want kids to think it was something that we thought was cool or rad. We didn't endorse it in any way."

Hoppus also told interviewers that he received fan mail following the song's release from fans that had contemplated suicide, but decided not to go through with it after hearing the song. Rolling Stone compared the controversy to that of Ozzy Osbourne's "Suicide Solution", which was played before a teen died by suicide in January 1986.

== Music video ==
The song's music video was directed by Liz Friedlander. The band was seeking a more serious and subdued visual approach that contrasted with the comedic, lighthearted videos for their past singles. In the clip, the band performs in a darkened, industrial atmosphere, surrounded by photos from the past. The camera pans in to each photo during verses and breaks, silently telling a vignette of a story or moment: as the band prepares to play a show, a man has a conversation with a girl and is subsequently left alone. In another, while DeLonge and Hoppus read magazines inside a late-night convenience store, a melancholy woman attempts to make a call via a pay phone. Other montages show the trio in the company of friends and practicing, a man looking out upon the sea, and a solitary man deserted by others at an outdoor restaurant. The final montage consists of personal photos from the band's past. Friedlander's vision for the video was to focus on everyday individuals, going through difficult moments in their lives. "We never know what's going on in other people's lives," she told Andrew Limbong of NPR in 2018. "We all are dealing with our stuff, and we don't look, and don't see, and so then we don't notice."

The footage for the video was filmed in the basement of a Los Angeles parking garage, with additional photography sessions shot in San Diego to capture personal locations tied to the band. It debuted on MTV's Total Request Live on March 7, 2000.

== Legacy ==
The band retired the song in 2009 after the death of Adam Goldstein, best known as DJ AM, a close personal friend of Barker and of the band. Hoppus noted that he could not bring himself to perform the tune, believing it to be "too hard". However, the band brought the song back after nine years, playing it again during their Kings of the Weekend Las Vegas residency in 2018. When asked about its revival, Hoppus said he found new meaning in the song: "I think of it more, now, as almost a celebration, of hardships gone through and friends lost." The band brought the song back again in 2023, with Hoppus noting that the song helped him through his battle with cancer.

For a 2018 broadcast of NPR's All Things Considered, reporter Andrew Limbong chose "Adam's Song" as part of their series of "American Anthems"—"music that challenges, unites, and celebrates". In describing his selection, he wrote:

You don't need subtlety to write an anthem; even the ones that are subversively tongue-in-cheek are pretty obvious about it. Most of the songs covered in this NPR series are huge: war songs, protest songs, songs that grace Super Bowl stages and national rallies. But there is room for the anthemic in small moments, too—when you're alone in your room and a song is the only thing that's there for you. [... "Adam's Song"] is a celebration that means a lot to a lot of people: Not an anthem in the usual sense of the word, more of a reminder.

=== Covers ===
"Adam's Song" has been covered by several artists. Notably, the Alabama duo Muscadine Bloodline released a country-styled reinterpretation, while singer-songwriter Madi Diaz included an acoustic rendition as part of a full album cover project.

== Formats and track listing ==
All songs written by Mark Hoppus and Tom DeLonge, except where noted. Live tracks recorded in November 1999 at the Universal Amphitheatre, Los Angeles, California.

US/UK CD single (155 742-2)

1. "Adam's Song" (Radio Edit) – 3:35
2. "Going Away to College" (Live) – 3:46
3. "Adam's Song" (Live) – 4:53
4. "Adam's Song" (Video) – 4:09

German CD single (155 743-2)

1. "Adam's Song" (Radio Edit) – 3:35
2. "Going Away to College" (Live) – 3:46

Australian CD single (155 752-2)

1. "Adam's Song" (Radio Edit) – 3:35
2. "Going Away to College" (Live) – 3:46
3. "Adam's Song" (Live) – 4:53
4. "Wendy Clear" (Live) – 2:46

== Credits and personnel ==
Credits adapted from the liner notes for Enema of the State.

Locations

- Recorded at Signature Sound and Studio West in San Diego, California, Mad Hatter Studios and the Bomb Factory in Los Angeles, California, Conway Recording Studios in Hollywood, California, and Big Fish Studios in Encinitas, California.
- Mixed at Conway Recording Studios in Hollywood, California, and South Beach Studios in Miami, Florida.
- Mastering at Bernie Grundman Mastering in Hollywood, California.

Personnel

- Mark Hoppus – bass guitar, vocals
- Tom DeLonge – guitars
- Travis Barker – drums
- Roger Joseph Manning, Jr. – keyboards
- Jerry Finn – production
- Tom Lord-Alge – mixing engineer
- Sean O'Dwyer – recording engineer
- Darrel Harvey – assistant engineer
- John Nelson – assistant engineer
- Robert Read – assistant engineer
- Mike Fasano – drum technician
- Rick DeVoe – management
- Gary Ashley – A&R
- Brian Gardner – mastering engineer

== Charts ==
=== Weekly charts ===
2000 weekly chart performance for "Adam's Song"
Chart (2000)	Peak position
Australia (ARIA)	72
Canada Rock/Alternative (RPM)	20
Germany (GfK)	98
Italy (FIMI)	21
New Zealand (Recorded Music NZ)	39
US Bubbling Under Hot 100 (Billboard)	1
US Hot 100 Airplay (Billboard)	79
US Alternative Airplay (Billboard)	2
US Commercial Alternative Cuts (CMJ)	1

2011 weekly chart performance for "Adam's Song"
Chart (2011)	Peak position
US Rock Digital Songs (Billboard)	38

=== Year-end charts ===
Year-end chart performance for "Adam's Song"
Chart (2000)	Position
US Modern Rock Tracks (Billboard)	7

== Certifications ==
Certifications and sales for "Adam's Song"
Region	Certification	Certified units/sales
Italy (FIMI)	Gold	25,000^{‡}
New Zealand (RMNZ)	Platinum	30,000^{‡}
United Kingdom (BPI)	Gold	400,000^{‡}
^{‡} Sales+streaming figures based on certification alone.
