= Seahaven (band) =

American rock band

- Origin: Torrance, California
- Genres: Alternative rock; post-hardcore; indie rock; emo; pop punk
- Years active: 2009–present
- Labels: Run for Cover; Pure Noise
- Members: Kyle Soto; Cody Christian; Mike DeBartolo; Eric Findlay
- Past members: Michael Craver; Hunter Babcock

Seahaven is an American rock band from Torrance, California.

== Biography ==
The band formed in 2009. They have released four full-length albums and two EPs. They released their first full-length album titled Winter Forever in 2011. Three years later they released their second full-length album, Reverie Lagoon: Music For Escapism Only. The album received generally positive reviews, being awarded four stars out of five by both Alter the Press and New Noise Magazine.

They are currently signed to Run For Cover Records.

On June 16, 2016, they released their first single from their untitled third record (as yet unreleased) called "Find A Way".

On April 17, 2018, Kyle Soto released an ep with his new project, “Welcome Cafe”.

On August 2, 2018, Seahaven announced that they would be supporting Man Overboard on its 10-year anniversary tour.

Seahaven played a show in Los Angeles on December 26, 2018, putting to rest any rumors that the band had broken up.

On October 6, 2020, they released their first single "Moon", from their new record "Halo of Hurt", to be released on November 20, 2020.

On November 20, 2020, Seahaven released their long awaited third studio album "Halo of Hurt" on Pure Noise Records. Frontman Kyle Soto commented on the latest release, stating, “I wanted to bring it back to the beginning of the band — a revived version of our younger selves in my garage in 2009. No timelines, no pressure. No need to fit a certain mold.”

On January 8, 2026, Seahaven released a new single "Long Goodbye" off their fourth studio album "Seahaven", which was released on June 7, 2026.

On June 7, 2026, Seahaven their self titled album "Seahaven" on Pure Noise Records.

== Members ==
Current members

- Kyle Soto - vocals, guitar
- Cody Christian - guitar
- Mike DeBartolo - bass, vocals, piano
- Eric Findlay - drums, bass on Ghost

Former members

- Michael Craver - guitarist
- James Phillips - drums, vocals
- Hunter Babcock
- Joseph "Pepe" Luttrell - guitarist

== Discography ==
Studio albums

- Winter Forever (2011)
- Reverie Lagoon: Music for Escapism Only (2014)
- Halo of Hurt (2020)
- Seahaven (2026)

EPs

- Ghost/Acoustic (2010)
- Acoustic Sessions (2011)

Singles

- Silhouette (Latin Skin) (2014)
- Find A Way (2016)
- Moon (2020)
- Harbor (2020)
- Bait (2020)
- Long Goodbye (2026)
