= Down til Dawn =

Studio album by Polytechnic
- Released: April 30, 2007
- Recorded: Bryn Derwen Studios
- Genre: Indie rock
- Length: 43:32
- Label: Shatterproof Records

Professional ratings
Review scores
Source	Rating
Allmusic	(not rated, no review)
BBC	(not rated)
NME	6/10 stars

Down til Dawn is the debut studio album by Polytechnic, released on April 30, 2007 in the UK. A US release date has not been announced. Much of the songs are re-recorded from previously released EPs and singles, including "Won't You Come Around?," "Pep," "Man Overboard," "Cold Hearted Business" and "Running Out Of Ideas."

== Track listing ==
1. "Bible Stories" - 4:01
2. "Won't You Come Around?" - 3:21
3. "Man Overboard" - 4:17
4. "Rain Check" - 4:23
5. "Cold Hearted Business" - 3:56
6. "Still Spinning" - 5:12
7. "Pep" - 2:46
8. "Quay Street" - 4:08
9. "Hoof" - 4:42
10. "Polling Card" - 3:23
11. "Running Out Of Ideas" - 6:43
