= Heart Attack (Man Overboard album) =

Studio album by Man Overboard
- Released: May 28, 2013
- Recorded: January–February 2013
- Studio: Studio 4, Conshohocken, Pennsylvania
- Genre: Pop punk
- Length: 43:53
- Label: Rise
- Producer: Steve Klein

Man Overboard chronology
Man Overboard (2011)	Heart Attack (2013)	Passing Ends (2014)

Heart Attack is the third studio album by American rock band Man Overboard.

== Background and production ==
In September 2011, Man Overboard released their self-titled second album. In February 2012, drummer Mike Hrycenko left the group and was replaced with Joe Talarico. The band performed on the Warped Tour between June and August. During the tour, the band worked on songs that would feature on their next album. In September, they started demoing the new material.

Heart Attack was recorded between January 12 and February 8, 2013 at Studio 4 in Conshohocken, Pennsylvania. New Found Glory guitarist Steve Klein produced the sessions with Will Yip providing additional production and acting as engineer. In comparison to the other songs that took several days to record, "Wide Awake" was tracked in a single day. Geoff Rickly, former Thursday frontman, tracked his vocal for "Open Season" with Hit the Lights guitarist Kevin Mahoney. New Found Glory bassist Ian Grushka contributed bass to "Boy Without Batteries". Vince Ratti and Yip mixed the recordings, before they were mastered by Yip. A making-of documentary of the band recording the album was later released in February 2013.

Performing on the 2012 Warped Tour, along with subsequent touring alongside Taking Back Sunday and Never Shout Never across the country, gave the songs a geographical influence. Previously, the band would only write songs in their home state of New Jersey. Talarico inclusion in the band was important as Heart Attack was the first album that they wrote with a drummer. Guitarist Wayne Wildrick said it became "a very drum-oriented record" as a result. "Wide Awake" was written by vocalist/bassist Nik Bruzzese following Warped Tour 2012. Wildrick said the acoustic track "competes the whole record."

== Release ==
On February 26, 2013, Heart Attack was announced for release in May. In addition, the album's artwork was revealed, which is an oil painting by painter Marie Rubelle Ledesma. In March and April, the group went on a co-headlining US tour, dubbed The Suppy Nation Tour, with The Story So Far. They were supported by Tonight Alive, Citizen and The American Scene. On March 12, "White Lies" was made available for streaming. The video that accompanied it featured a mixture of lyrics, live and studio footage. "Open Season" was made available for streaming on April 9. A music video was released for "Where I Left You" on April 24. Heart Attack was made available for streaming on May 16, before being released on May 28 through Rise Records. To promote its release, the band performed at Slam Dunk Festival in the UK, and did a series of US in-store performances and signings. Between June and August, the group performed on the Warped Tour. In September, the band embarked on a brief tour of the US and Canada with support from Real Friends and Young Statues.

In October and November, the group supported Mayday Parade on the Glamour Kills Tour. The band then performed as part of Warped Tour Australia in November and December. In late December, the band headlined a holiday show, before supported Bayside for three holiday shows. In January and February 2014, the band supported Mayday Parade on their headlining European tour. On March 20, a music video was released for "How to Hide Your Feelings", directed by Max Moore. From late March to early May, the band supported All Time Low on the A Love Like Tour in the US. On May 12, a music video was premiered for "Wide Awake" through The A.V. Club. The video was directed by Moore. Following this, the group went on a headlining North American tour in May and June, dubbed The Heart Attack Tour. They were supported by Transit, Forever Came Calling and Knuckle Puck. The group were due to go on a European leg of the tour, however, it was cancelled due to Bruzzese requiring ACL surgery.

== Reception ==
Professional ratings
Aggregate scores
Source	Rating
Metacritic	73/100
Review scores
Source	Rating
AbsolutePunk	65%
AllMusic	3/5 stars
Big Cheese	4/5
Dead Press!	7/10 stars
idobi	4.25/5
New Noise	4.5/5 stars

Heart Attack received generally favorable reviews from critics, according to review aggregation website Metacritic. The album debuted at number 46 on the Billboard 200. It also charted at number 2 on Hard Rock Albums, number 6 on Independent Albums and number 13 on Top Rock Albums.

== Track listing ==
Track listing per sleeve.

1. "Secret Pain" – 2:48
2. "Boy Without Batteries" – 2:24
3. "Where I Left You" – 2:46
4. "Heart Attack" – 3:18
5. "White Lies" – 3:06
6. "S.A.D." – 3:04
7. "Suppy" – 2:39
8. "How to Hide Your Feelings" – 3:43
9. "Swandive" – 3:01
10. "Hoodie Song" – 2:56
11. "Re Run" – 3:39
12. "Open Season" – 3:10
13. "Damage Control" – 3:49
14. "Wide Awake" – 3:22

== Personnel ==
Personnel per sleeve.

Man Overboard

- Zac Eisenstein – vocals, guitar
- Nik Bruzzese – vocals, bass guitar
- Wayne Wildrick – guitar
- Justin Collier – guitar
- Joe Talarico – drums

Additional musicians

- Ian Grushka – bass (track 2)
- Geoff Rickly – vocals (track 12)

Production

- Steve Klein – producer
- Will Yip – additional production, mixing, engineer, mastering
- Vince Ratti – mixing
- Marie Rubelle Ledesma – oil painting
- Allison Newbold – photographs

== Charts ==
Charts (2013)	Peak position
US Billboard 200	46
US Top Hard Rock Albums (Billboard)	2
US Independent Albums (Billboard)	6
US Top Rock Albums (Billboard)	13
