= Real Talk (Man Overboard album) =

Studio album by Man Overboard
- Released: July 19, 2010
- Genre: Pop punk
- Length: 32:53
- Label: Run for Cover
- Producers: Jesse Cannon, Mike Oettinger

Man Overboard chronology
Before We Met: A Collection of Old Songs (2010)	Real Talk (2010)	The Human Highlight Reel (2011)

Professional ratings
Review scores
Source	Rating
AbsolutePunk	86%
Alter the Press	Favorable
idobi	4.5/10
Punknews.org	2.5/5 stars

Real Talk is the debut studio album by American rock band Man Overboard.

== Background and release ==
Man Overboard was founded by vocalist/bassist Nik Bruzzese and lead guitarist Wayne Wildrick in 2008. The pair brought in vocalist/guitarist Zac Eisenstein, and the group went to work on what would be their first release, Hung Up on Nothing. The band soon toured across the U.S. On November 5, 2009, it was announced they signed to Run for Cover. Following the release of a few more EPs, the band went to work on their debut album.

== Release ==
In February 2010, Man Overboard went on a US tour with Therefore I Am and the Wonder Years. The Noise from Upstairs acoustic EP was released in April 2010; alongside this, the band's debut album was announced for release in a few months time. Real Talk was released on July 19, 2010, through Run for Cover. Shortly afterwards, the band performed at Sound and Fury Festival, and then supported Tigers Jaw on their headlining US tour. On August 10, Real Talk was made available for streaming via Alternative Press. From mid August to early October, the band supported the Swellers on their tour of the US. On September 3, it was announced that guitarist Wayne Wildrick had left the band. The band explained that Wildrick had "some personal things to take care of". As a result of this, drummer Justin Collier switched to guitar, and Mike Hrycenko was brought in to fill in on drums. In March 2011, the band went on tour with The Wonder Years, followed by a March–April tour with Senses Fail. On April 28, it was announced that Wildrick had re-joined the band. A music video was released for "Montrose" on August 9.

== Reception ==
The album was critically acclaimed upon release. The album was included at number 48 on Rock Sound's "The 51 Most Essential Pop Punk Albums of All Time" list.

== Track listing ==
1. "Real Talk" – 1:50
2. "World Favorite" – 2:55
3. "Fantasy Girl" – 2:57
4. "Parting Gift" – 2:35
5. "Darkness, Everybody" – 3:01
6. "She's Got Her Own Man Now" – 3:20
7. "Al Sharpton" – 2:32
8. "Montrose" – 2:53
9. "FM Dial Style" – 2:19
10. "I Like You" – 2:34
11. "Septemberism" – 2:37
12. "Sidekick" – 3:13

Bandcamp bonus track

13. "Again" – 3:02

== Personnel ==
Man Overboard

- Nik Bruzzese – vocals, bass
- Zac Eisenstein – vocals, guitar
- Wayne Wildrick – guitar, backing vocals
- Justin Collier – drums, percussion
- Jeff Kummer – drums on "World Favorite," "Montrose," "I Like You," and "Septemberism"
