= Man Overboard (Blink-182 song) =

2000 single by Blink-182

Single by Blink-182

from the album The Mark, Tom, and Travis Show (The Enema Strikes Back!)
- Released: September 2, 2000
- Recorded: July 2000
- Studio: Signature Sound, San Diego, California
- Genre: Pop-punk; skate punk
- Length: 2:48
- Label: MCA
- Songwriters: Mark Hoppus; Tom DeLonge
- Producer: Jerry Finn

Blink-182 singles chronology
"Adam's Song" (2000)	"Man Overboard" (2000)	"The Rock Show" (2001)

"Man Overboard" is a song by the American rock band Blink-182. It was first released on September 2, 2000, through MCA Records as the lead single from the band's live album The Mark, Tom, and Travis Show (The Enema Strikes Back!) (2000). It is the sole studio recording on the release, and was recorded as a bonus track to help promote its release. The song's lyrics, credited to bassist Mark Hoppus and guitarist Tom DeLonge, are about losing their original drummer Scott Raynor to alcohol abuse. In the song, Hoppus repeats the refrain "so sorry it's over," and goes on to highlight occasions in which a friend was too intoxicated to be dependable.

The song was originally written during sessions for the band's third album, Enema of the State. Musically, the song is led by a distinctive bass line, accompanied by melodic guitar riffs and straightforward rock drums. Its songwriting was slow to develop, with the group unable to complete its lyrics in time for placement on the album. At then-label MCA's suggestion, the trio re-approached the track for inclusion on the live album. Though the band has never officially confirmed its basis, "Man Overboard" has widely been regarded as a reference to former drummer Raynor, who co-founded Blink-182 and had struggled with alcohol dependency in his last years behind the kit, before being dismissed from the band midway through a 1998 tour.

The single received positive notices from music critics, many of whom have listed it among the band's best songs. Its music video—a number-one hit on MTV—was directed by Marcos Siega, and parodies the group's past clips with dwarfs in place of the band members. The song was a success on rock charts in North America; it peaked at number two on Billboard's Modern Rock Tracks chart, and within the top 20 on Canada's rock charts compiled by RPM. The song was later included on the band's compilation album Greatest Hits. The song is the namesake of the pop punk act Man Overboard.

== Background ==
Though officially unconfirmed, "Man Overboard" is generally believed to be written about the group's original drummer Scott Raynor, who performed and recorded with the trio between 1992 and 1998. Raynor and guitarist Tom DeLonge first met in school, and later met bassist Mark Hoppus to form Blink-182. In the interim years, the band recorded independent albums and toured frequently, attracting a following at the peak of punk rock's mainstream popularity. Though the band was growing successful, tensions between DeLonge/Hoppus and Raynor began to grow evident. Raynor frequently spoke of his desire to return to school, and disagreed with their decision to sign to major-label MCA. (Note: Raynor had no qualms about major-label distribution, remarking to journalist Joe Shooman that "I always had aspirations for the band that went beyond the independent paradigm [...] I loved being on the radio and MTV." He was simply more interested in affiliating with Epitaph Records, which he felt offered "less pressure and more creative freedom due in part to the relatively minimal financial investment on [behalf] of the executives.") He began to struggle with alcohol abuse, which started to affect his performance live. Raynor, interviewed by journalist Joe Shooman for an unofficial band biography, admitted that his behavior in this era was "irresponsible [...] I was drinking way too much." In one instance, Raynor broke both of his heels in an episode while inebriated, and was forced to record the band's major-label debut, Dude Ranch (1997), while on crutches. Eventually, DeLonge and Hoppus phoned Raynor, issuing an ultimatum that he agree to attend an in-patient rehabilitation facility, or be removed from the band. Raynor agreed to do so, but was still dismissed from the group. He later conceded to Shooman that the duo were "right to fire him," though it caused him great grief at the time.

The band would minimize the impact of the situation in future interviews and as of 2023, still remain vague regarding his departure. Blink-182 resumed with new drummer Travis Barker, formerly of the Aquabats, at the helm. "Man Overboard"—named for the exclamation made when a passenger falls from a ship—was first demoed for the band's next album, Enema of the State. It was written by Hoppus, and credited to both he and DeLonge. Barker contributed on drums, though was at this point in their career considered a touring musician and did not receive songwriting credit. Its songwriting process went unfinished, as the group had issues with its lyrics and harmonies. After completing Enema of the State, they simply decided to return to the idea another time. The following year, the band's label, MCA Records, requested they record a new song as a bonus track and single to promote their forthcoming live album, The Mark, Tom, and Travis Show (The Enema Strikes Back!). The trio found it natural to re-approach "Man Overboard", which was completed in mid-2000 with producer Jerry Finn. It was recorded at Signature Sound in the band's hometown of San Diego, California, with Sean O'Dwyer serving as recording engineer. Lastly, it was mixed by Tom Lord-Alge and mastered by Brian Gardner at his studio in Hollywood.

== Composition ==
"Man Overboard"
A sample of "Man Overboard"'s bass intro.

The song opens with a distinctive solo ostinato on bass guitar performed by Hoppus, preceding a refrain that repeats the phrase "so sorry it's over." As the song begins, Tom DeLonge contributes melodic guitar lines while Barker energetically drums. According to sheet music published at Musicnotes.com by Kobalt Music Publishing America, "Man Overboard" is written in common time with a fast tempo of 192 beats per minute. Set in the key of G major, it follows the chord progression of G–G_{5}–A–C_{5} for the intro, a series of G–Em–C in the verses, and G_{5}–E_{5}–C_{5}–G_{5} progression for the choruses. Hoppus and DeLonge's vocal parts span from F♯_{4} to G_{5}.

Stereogum contributor Pranav Trewn observes that the song lyrically presents a "conflicted account out of two unambiguous narratives." Throughout the song, Hoppus alludes to the loss of a friend to alcoholism, recalling their tendency to down "shots without a chaser," and decrying them as "out of line, and rarely sober." Trewn writes that Hoppus switches between "remorseful affection and cold bitterness" toward the song's subject, suggesting that while he commiserates with this friend, DeLonge is more outwardly disdainful. DeLonge's portions, serving as backup vocals, claim "there's so much more" the duo wanted from the subject. The song concludes with the understanding that Hoppus fails to miss this person's presence, demanding this friend "hand in [their] resignation."

== Music video ==
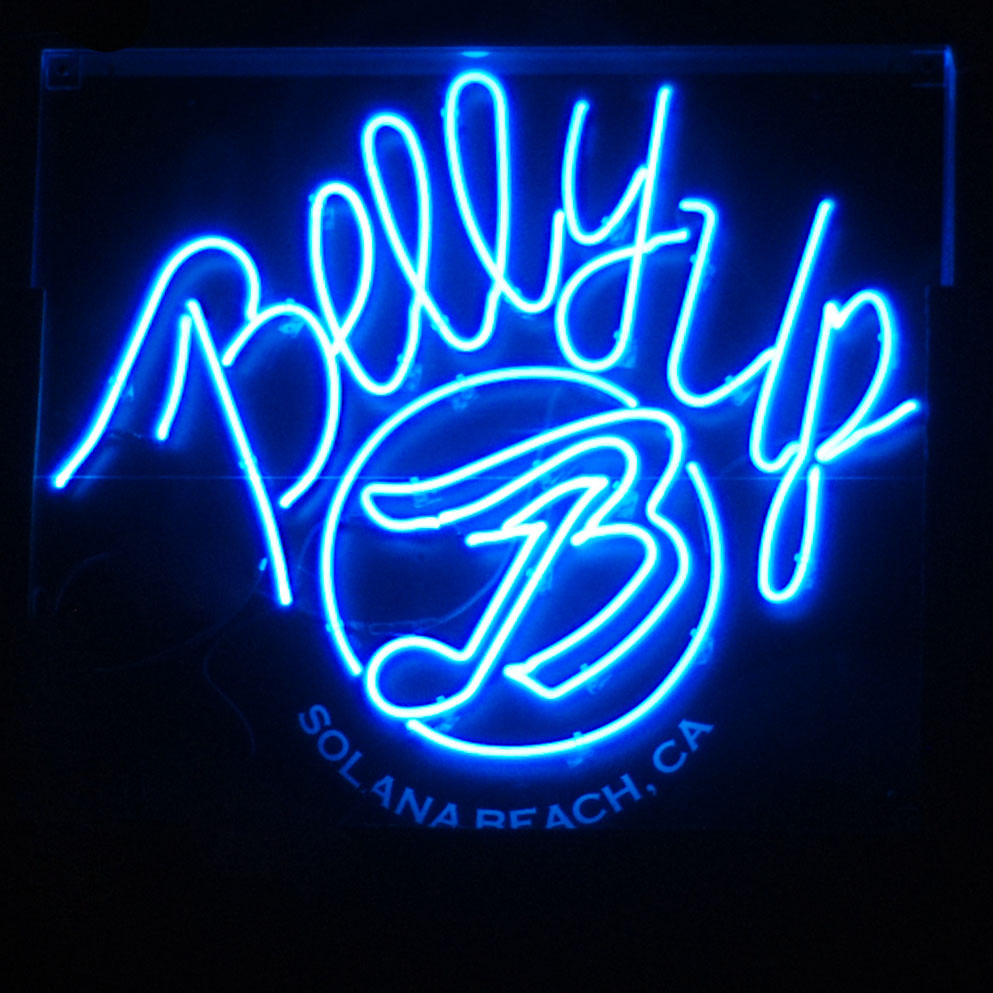
Neon sign for the Belly-Up Tavern in California, where the video was partially filmed.

The music video was directed by Marcos Siega. The band first met Siega coming up in the punk rock scene, and their similar ethos led them to hire him in the past for the music videos for "All the Small Things" and "What's My Age Again?". In the "Man Overboard" clip, the trio—sleeping in a tour van speeding overnight—each have nightmares that take place in their past music videos ("What's My Age Again?" for Hoppus, "Adam's Song" for DeLonge and "All the Small Things" for Barker), in which persons of short stature play their parts. These shots are intercut with clips of the band performing live, filmed at the Belly-Up Tavern in Solana Beach, California. The band had previously utilized a cast of little people for its performance at the 2000 MTV Video Music Awards on September 7, 2000. The band was subsequently touring in Europe when Barker suggested they employ the same actors for their next video. Hoppus proposed it would be humorous if the actors replicate the band's "What's My Age Again?" music video, in which the three ran naked through the streets of Los Angeles. This was parlayed into a full-on parody of their past music videos, starring little people in the roles of the band members, who themselves played extras in the video. The band phoned Siega, who liked the idea and wrote its treatment. They also hired an artist to re-create DeLonge and Barker's tattoos on the actors.

Despite the song's more serious subject matter, the band hoped to provide an entertaining video, in line with their humorous personas. The video was shot between September 18–24, 2000 in Los Angeles and San Diego. Hoppus's mother makes a cameo in the concert pit at the Belly-Up. It was first added to MTV rotation for the week ending October 8, 2000, and to the playlist of the Box and Canadian channel MuchMusic the following weeks. It became MTV's most-played clip for the week ending October 22, surpassing videos by acts such as the Backstreet Boys and Christina Aguilera. Aiding in the clip's popularity was a half-hour special taking viewers behind the scenes of its production. This special, Making the Video: Man Overboard, first premiered on October 18, 2000.

== Commercial performance ==
The song debuted on Billboard's Modern Rock Tracks ranking at number 31 in the issue dated September 30, 2000. Billboard designated it with the signifier "Airpower" in the following issue, denoting heavy airplay rotation. It rose steadily over the following weeks to reach a peak of number two on November 18, 2000, its eighth week on the chart. It was held out of the top spot by "Hemorrhage (In My Hands)", a single by fellow American rockers Fuel. It last appeared on the ranking in the issue dated February 24, 2001, after which it fell out of the top 40. In Canada, it peaked at number 19 in its third week on the Top 30 Rock Report, a listing compiled by the magazine RPM. Outside of North America, "Man Overboard" charted in two locations. In Australia, the song reached number 40 on its national ARIA Charts, while in New Zealand, the song ranked number 49.

== Release and reception ==
"Man Overboard" was first alluded to in an August 2000 article on MTV.com, which reported the band were back in the studio to record a studio track accompanying its new live album, The Mark, Tom, and Travis Show (The Enema Strikes Back!). The song debuted online, streaming exclusively on MTV.com, the website for L.A.-based radio station KROQ-FM and the band's official site on September 2, 2000. The song was later serviced to radio on September 18 of that year. A maxi CD single for the song was issued on December 5, 2000. Its release prompted fans to speculate about whether or not it was referring to Raynor. Raynor, in the Shooman interview, claims to have never listened to the song. A live version of the song was initially slated as a bonus track for the band's 2005 Greatest Hits compilation, but was left off.

Original reviews of the song were positive. An uncredited Billboard writer, reviewing the single, complimented the song's "infectious" guitar riff and Barker's "aggressive" percussion, suggesting its potential to crossover between multiple radio formats. Natalie Nichols of the Los Angeles Times characterized it as a "brash-yet-pretty heartbreak anthem." Stereogum contributor Pranav Trewn extolled it as among the band's best songs, commenting that its structure is "composed solely of hooks. There's not a single section that couldn't function as the song's center, with one of Hoppus' all-time best bass lines reigning most identifiable as a chorus." Consequence of Sound, in a 2015 top 10 of the band's best songs, ranked it as number three, with writer Randall Colburn calling it "triumphant": "Such straight-faced commentary on friendship was fairly uncharted territory for Blink at the time, and that "Man Overboard" transcends the band's relationship with Raynor speaks to the strength of the songwriting. It's also one of the finest displays of one of Blink's more indelible musical touches: Hoppus' bass."

== Format and track listing ==
US promo CD (2000)

1. "Man Overboard" (Radio Edit) – 2:48
2. "Man Overboard" (Album Version) – 2:48

European promo CD (2000)

1. "Man Overboard" (Radio Edit) – 2:48

Mexican promo CD (2000)

1. "Man Overboard" (Radio Edit) – 2:48

Australian CD (2000)

1. "Man Overboard" (Album Version) – 2:50
2. "13 Miles" (Live) – 2:11
3. "Words of Wisdom" (Teaser Version) – 3:01

Live tracks were recorded at the Bill Graham Civic Auditorium in San Francisco, California, on November 4, 1999.

== Charts ==
Chart (2000)	Peak position
Australia (ARIA)	40
Canada Top 30 Rock Report (RPM)	19
New Zealand (Recorded Music NZ)	49
US Bubbling Under Hot 100 (Billboard)	17
US Alternative Airplay (Billboard)	2

== Radio and release history ==
Country	Date	Format	Label
United States	September 2, 2000	Streaming audio	MCA Records
United States	September 18, 2000	Contemporary hit radio, modern rock	MCA Records
United States	December 5, 2000	CD single	MCA Records
