= Man Overboard (band) =

American pop punk band

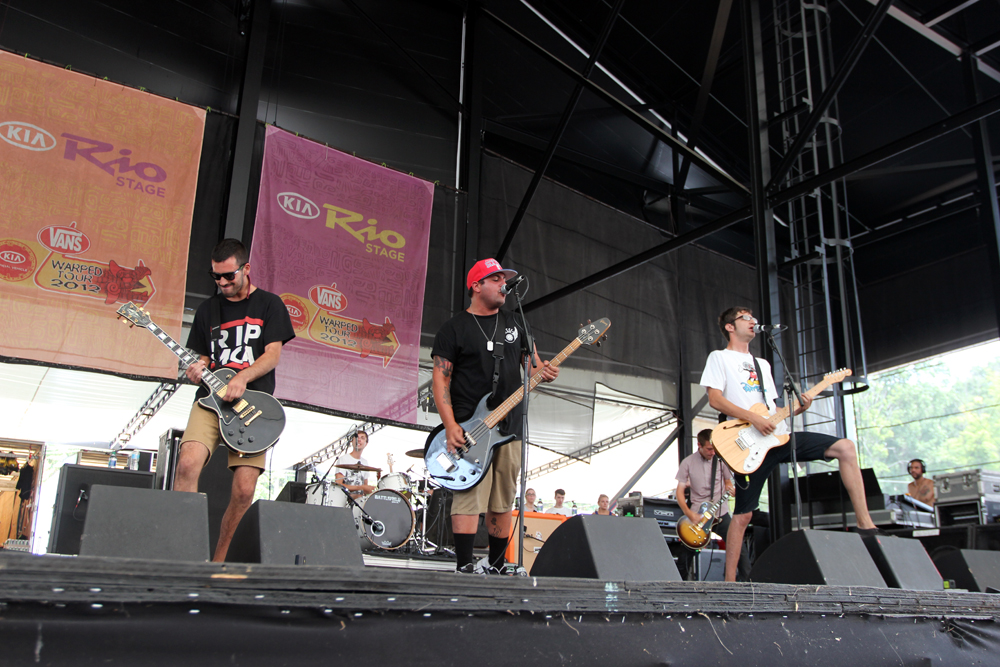
- Man Overboard performing on Warped Tour in 2012.

Background information
- Origin: Mt. Laurel/Williamstown, New Jersey, U.S
- Genre: Pop punk
- Years active: 2008–2016; 2018–present
- Labels: Cobra; Panic; Run for Cover; Rise; Lost Tape Collective; Pure Noise
- Members: Nik Bruzzese; Justin Collier; Zac Eisenstein; Joe Talarico; Wayne Wildrick
- Past members: Justin Mondschein; Mike Hrycenko

Man Overboard is an American pop punk band from Mt. Laurel and Williamstown, New Jersey that began in 2008. Since then, they had released two EPs, an acoustic EP, a split with Boston pop punk band Transit, a compilation and four full-length albums. Taking influence from such pop punk acts as Blink-182, Saves the Day, and Taking Back Sunday, Man Overboard played a brand of upbeat and poppy pop punk with the emotion of 90s emo acts such as The Promise Ring. The band was signed to Rise Records. They are well known for their motto within the pop punk scene to "Defend Pop Punk". On January 28, 2016, they announced a hiatus on their official website; the hiatus ended on August 2, 2018, when the band announced a 10-year anniversary tour.

== History ==
=== Formation and EPs (2008–09) ===
Man Overboard was formed by childhood friends, Nik Bruzzese and Wayne Wildrik, when they began writing songs together at Nik's Small Hill Studio. The band's name was inspired by the Blink-182 song of the same name. Wildrick then invited Zac Eisenstein, who at the time was vocalist of the band The Front Page which Wildrick was also a member of, to sing and play guitar. Justin Mondschein from the band Bangarang! was asked to play drums but after he and a revolving door of other drummers left, Justin Collier (another member of The Front Page) took over drums full-time. The core line-up of the band was then completed. They entered the studio in 2008 to record their debut EP, Hung Up on Nothing. The band then went on a nationwide tour to promote the EP.

From mid-August to early October 2009, the band supported Fireworks on their headlining tour of the US. In November, they signed with Run for Cover Records where they released a three-song digital EP entitled, Dahlia, which was produced by Jesse Cannon. This was followed by a split with Transit, in December 2009.

=== Rise Records and self-titled album (2010–12) ===
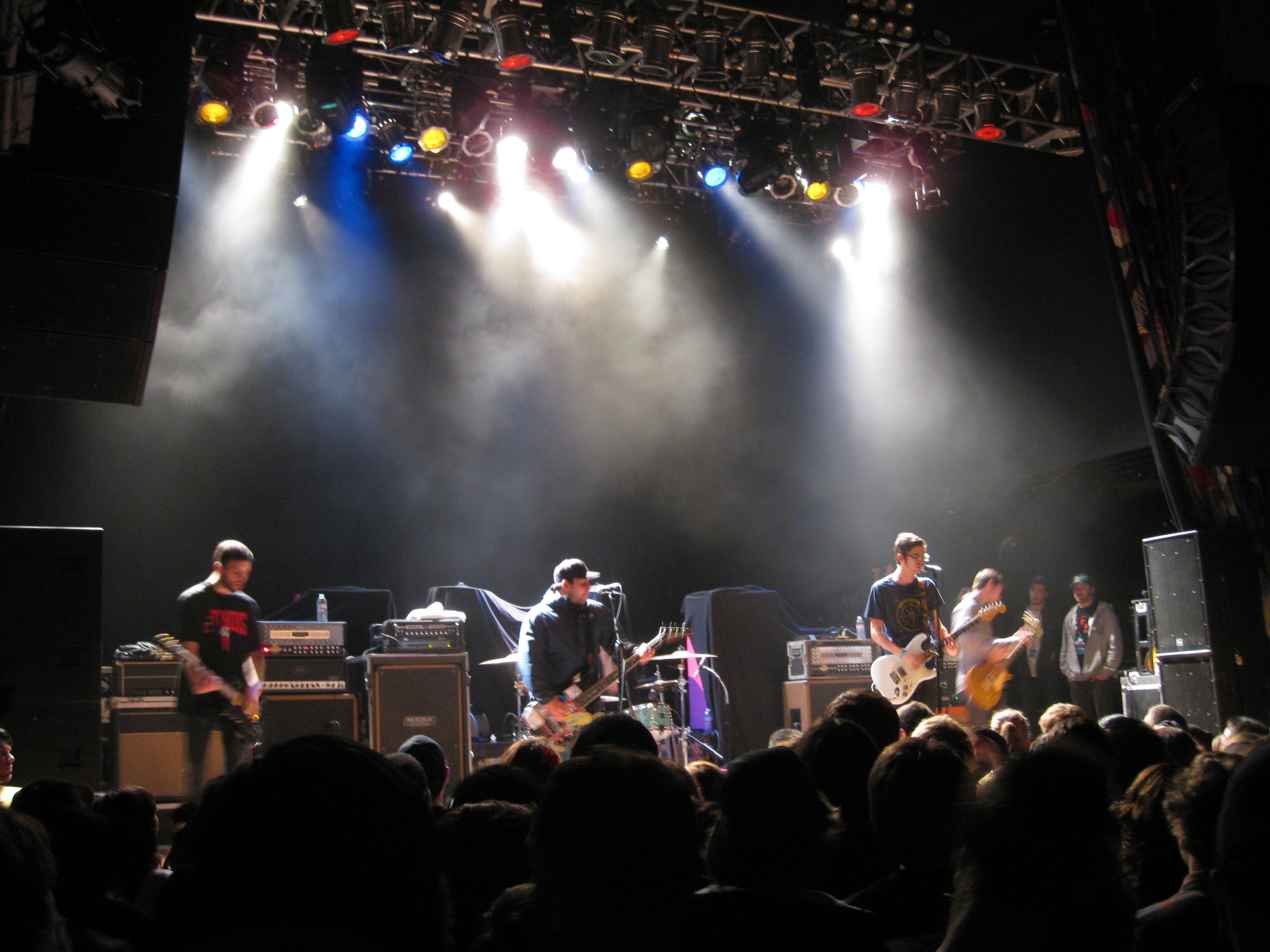
Man Overboard in 2011

In 2010, the 10 track compilation entitled, Before We Met: A Collection of Old Songs, featuring songs from Hung Up on Nothing was released on Panic Records in February. The band then released an acoustic EP on Run for Cover, Noise from Upstairs in March. But perhaps their most acclaimed work to date was their debut album, Real Talk. Released on CD, vinyl and digital format on July 20 on Run for Cover Records. The album picked up a favorable review from Absolute Punk who called it "the pop punk album of the summer", AMP calling it "A 5 star, 10 out of 10 release. A must pick up listen in every respect" and Australian website Killyourstereo calling it "the best pop punk album of 2010" and rating it 98 out of 100. On the back of Real Talk, Man Overboard have toured the US with such bands as The Wonder Years, The Swellers, Fireworks and Transit and Europe with Senses Fail, The Ghost Inside, Transit, All Time Low and All or Nothing.

Founding member and guitarist Wayne Wildrick left the band in August 2010 for personal reasons. Then-drummer Justin Collier replaced Wildrick on guitar and Mike Hrycenko (who was also in The Front Page) joined on drums. In December 2010, Man Overboard signed with Rise Records and announced they will release their sophomore full-length with Rise as well as Run for Cover in 2011. Prior to releasing the album, the band will put out another compilation LP on Run for Cover entitled The Human Highlight Reel, that features Dahlia, Noise from Upstairs, Real Talk B-Sides, a "Promise Ring" cover and two brand new songs as well as a new 7 entitled The Absolute Worst on Rise on February 22, 2011. "The Absolute Worst" was made available for streaming via the band's Facebook page. "Driveway" made available for download on April 7. In April 2011, Wayne Wildrick rejoined the band and stated that his reason for his departure in 2010 was due to anxiety. He played his first performance at Bamboozle and Man Overboard continued as a 5-piece.

In August 2011, they announced their new album would be self-titled and released through Rise Records on September 27th. They also released the track listing and album artwork. It was confirmed in July 2011 that the band was added to the opening act of the Pop Punks Not Dead Tour occurring that fall headlined by New Found Glory. Other opening acts include Set Your Goals, The Wonder Years, and This Time Next Year. In December 2011, Man Overboard acted as direct support for emo band The Early November on several of their reunion shows in the Eastern United States.

For the first half of 2012, Man Overboard toured the United States and Europe, with many different bands, including Trapped Under Ice, Daytrader, The Story So Far, Save Your Breath, and Handguns. On January 4, 2012, it was confirmed that the band would play all of the 2012 Vans Warped Tour. Drummer Mike Hrycenko did not join Man Overboard for their performance at the Pop Punk the Vote Tour. Man Overboard announced they parted ways with Mike Hrycenko during the PPTV tour. He left on good terms, stating he was pursuing a college degree.

A re-issue of the self-titled album was released on July 3, 2012 and features five bonus tracks – a remastered version of "Love Your Friends, Die Laughing", a full band version of "Dear You", and alternate versions of "Real Talk", "Not the First" and "Atlas" (the latter four recorded at Panda Studios). The band spent autumn of 2012 touring the east coast with pop-punk band Major League, then the west coast with Taking Back Sunday and Bayside and touring the UK with New Found Glory for Warped UK.

=== Heart Attack (2012–14) ===
It was announced as a surprise in late February that, over winter, the band had recorded an entire new album. This announcement followed the notion that Man Overboard, commonly recognised as "particularly frequent" with releasing music for their fans, had been relatively quiet for the past year. Man Overboard announced the release date of their third studio album entitled Heart Attack, the album would set to be released on May 28, 2013. The band released its first song off the album, "White Lies," on March 12 through Rise Records' YouTube channel. The next song entitled "Open Season" was released on April 9, featuring Geoff Rickly of post-hardcore band Thursday. The band would then release a music video for the next song off the album "Where I Left You" on April 24 through Rise Records's YouTube channel.

Man Overboard released Heart Attack on May 28 via Rise Records. Heart Attack received generally positive reviews by critics, as well as opening up at #46 on the Billboard Top 200 with over 8,100 copies sold in its first week, becoming the band's highest charted album to date. The band played the entire 2013 Vans Warped Tour all summer long and on August 5, 2013, it was confirmed that Man Overboard will be embarking on the Glamour Kills tour with Mayday Parade in autumn of 2013. On January 20, 2014, Man Overboard announced that they would be direct support for All Time Low on the "A Love Like Tour" in the United States, along with Handguns. The tour started on March 28, 2014, in Richmond, Virginia and ended on May 3, 2014, in Baltimore, Maryland. On March 3, 2014, Man Overboard released a music video for "How to Hide Your Feelings," via the Red Bull Music site. Their new EP, Passing Ends was released on 27 October 2014.

=== Heavy Love and hiatus (2015–2018) ===
On May 10, 2015, the band announced their new album Heavy Love, was released on June 30, 2015. The day after, on May 11, 2015, the band released three tracks (Borderline, Splinter, and Now That you're Home) from the album with music videos on their YouTube channel. On June 3, 2015, the band released a video for another track on the album called "Cliffhanger" and then another on June 18, 2015, called "Reality Check". The band promoted the new album, "Heavy Love," during the 2015 Vans Warped Tour. On January 28, 2016, the band announced they were going on hiatus.

=== Return and 10-year anniversary tour (2018-present) ===
On August 2, 2018, Man Overboard announced the end of their hiatus via social media and press coverage. The announcement came with a 10-year anniversary tour announcement. The tour took place in late fall 2018, visited New York, Philadelphia, and Cambridge, and offered support from Seahaven. The tour marked the band's return to live performances following their hiatus.

== Musical style and influences ==
Man Overboard have been described as pop-punk and emo pop. Chrysta Cherrie of AllMusic compared the band's music to the "melodic, energetic hardcore-influenced" works of bands such as Lifetime and Midtown. The band's vocalists usually sing in the tenor vocal range.

The band's lyrics explore real life topics such as love, frustration, recreational drug use, adolescense, youth and the suburbs.

== Band members ==
Current members

- Zac Eisenstein — lead vocals, piano, rhythm guitar (2008–present)
- Nik Bruzzese — lead vocals, bass, acoustic guitar (2008–present)
- Wayne Wildrick — lead guitar, backing vocals (2008–2010, 2011–present)
- Justin Collier — rhythm guitar, backing vocals (2011–present); lead guitar (2010–2011); drums, percussion (2009–2010)
- Joe Talarico — drums, percussion (2012–present)

Former members

- Justin Mondschein — drums, percussion (2008–2009)
- Mike Hrycenko — drums, percussion (2010–2012)

Timeline

== Discography ==
Studio albums

- Real Talk (2010)
- Man Overboard (2011)
- Heart Attack (2013)
- Heavy Love (2015)

=== Music videos ===
- "Montrose" (Run for Cover Records, 2011) – directed by Mel Soria
- "Something's Weird" (Rise Records, 2012)
- "Dead End Dreams" (Rise Records, 2012)
- "Where I Left You" (Rise Records, 2013)
- "How to Hide Your Feelings" (Rise Records, 2014) – directed by Eric Teti
- "Wide Awake" (Rise Records, 2014) – directed by Max Moore
- "For Vince" (Rise Records, 2014) – directed by Eric Teti
- "Borderline" (Rise Records, 2015)
- "Now That You're Home" (Rise Records, 2015)
- "Splinter" (Rise Records, 2015)
- "She's in Pictures" (Rise Records, 2015)
