= +44 discography =

Discography of a band

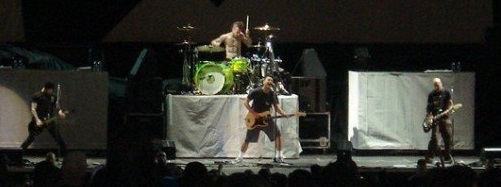
- +44 performing in 2006
- Studio albums: 1
- Singles: 4
- Music videos: 3
- Demos: 3

The discography of +44, an American alternative rock supergroup, consists of one studio album, four singles, three demos and three music videos.

== Albums ==
=== Studio albums ===
List of studio albums
| Title | Details | Peak chart positions | | | | | | | | | |
| Title | Details | US | AUS | AUT | CAN | FRA | GER | IRL | SWI | SCO | UK |
|---|---|---|---|---|---|---|---|---|---|---|---|
| When Your Heart Stops Beating | Released: November 14, 2006; Label: Interscope (B0007754); Format: CD, digital download, LP | 10 | 47 | 22 | 8 | 134 | 30 | 77 | 79 | 46 | 50 |

== Singles ==
| Title | Year | Peak chart positions | | | | | | | | | | Certifications | Album |
| Title | Year | US | US Alt. | US Pop | AUS | AUT | CAN Rock | GER | IRL | SCO | UK | Certifications | Album |
|---|---|---|---|---|---|---|---|---|---|---|---|---|---|
| "Lycanthrope"^{[A]} | 2006 | — | — | — | — | — | — | — | — | — | — | | When Your Heart Stops Beating |
| "When Your Heart Stops Beating" | 2006 | 89 | 14 | 78 | 47 | 74 | 27 | 72 | 47 | 19 | 47 | BPI: Silver | When Your Heart Stops Beating |
| "Baby Come On" | 2007 | — | — | — | — | — | — | — | — | — | — | | When Your Heart Stops Beating |
| "155" | 2007 | — | — | — | — | — | — | — | — | — | — | | When Your Heart Stops Beating |
"—" denotes a recording that did not chart or was not released in that territory.

- A "Lycanthrope" was released exclusively in the UK.

== Promotional CDs/7"s ==
| Title | Year | Format |
|---|---|---|
| "No, It Isn't" | 2005 | CD |
| "Cliffdiving" | 2006 | 7" |
| "Lycanthrope" | 2006 | 7" |
| When Your Heart Stops Beating Album Sampler | 2006 | CD |

== Compilation appearances ==
| Title | Year | Label | +44 song |
|---|---|---|---|
| Kevin & Bean's Super Christmas | 2006 | KROQ | "Christmas Vacation" |
| MTV Presents Laguna Beach: Summer Can Last Forever | 2006 | Interscope Records | "When Your Heart Stops Beating" |
| Promo Only Modern Rock Radio: November 2006 | 2006 | Promo Only | "When Your Heart Stops Beating" |
| U-mode (December/2006) 12 | 2006 | Universal International | "When Your Heart Stops Beating" |
| Universal | 2006 | Universal Music Kft. | "When Your Heart Stops Beating (Single Version)" |
| Interscope Radio Compilation Volume 5 2006 | 2006 | Interscope Records | "When Your Heart Stops Beating" |
| Rock Sound Volume 113 | 2006 | Rock Sound | "Lycanthrope" |
| Polydor New Music Sampler 2007 | 2007 | Polydor | "When Your Heart Stops Beating" |
| Polydor Presents...Q1 2007 | 2007 | Polydor | "When Your Heart Stops Beating" |
| MySpace Tribute To The Smashing Pumpkins | 2007 | MySpace Records | "I Am One" |
| Punk Goes Acoustic 2 | 2007 | Fearless Records | "Baby Come On" (acoustic) |
| De Afrekening 42 | 2007 | Universal Music Belgium | "When Your Heart Stops Beating" |
| Cmj New Music Monthly - Volume 144 | 2007 | CMJ | "155" |
| Kill Pop: Scream Till It Hurts | 2007 | Universal Music Australia | "When Your Heart Stops Beating" |
| Only The Best Hits 2007 | 2007 | Universal Music Group | "When Your Heart Stops Beating" |
| UltraЗвук 5.0 | 2007 | Universal Music Russia | "When Your Heart Stops Beating" |
| 97x Green Room Volume 3 | 2007 | 97x | "155" |
| Rock | 2007 | Universal Music France | "When Your Heart Stops Beating" |
| Lock & Load Volume III | 2007 | Gallo Record Company | "When Your Heart Stops Beating" |
| Teen Spirit 4 | 2007 | Virgin Music Group | "Lycanthrope" |
| Nu Rock Traxx Volume 96 | 2007 | ERG Music | "Baby Come On" |
| Interscope Radio Compilation Volume 01 2007 | 2007 | Interscope Records | "When Your Heart Stops Beating" |
| Promo Only Modern Rock Radio: April 2007 | 2007 | Promo Only | "Baby Come On" |
| Первый Альтернативный. Vol. 1 | 2007 | Universal Music Russia | "When Your Heart Stops Beating" |
| 99X Live X 12 - Souls | 2007 | 99X/WNNX | "When Your Heart Stops Beating" |
| All Areas Special: Zero - A Tribute To Smashing Pumpkins | 2007 | Visions Magazine | "I Am One" |
| Rock Is Not Dead | 2007 | Magic Records | "When Your Heart Stops Beating" |
| Rock 'Til You Drop: Volume 3 | 2008 | Universal Music Group | "When Your Heart Stops Beating" |
| Rock 'Til You Drop Volume 4 | 2009 | Universal Music Group | "Lycanthrope" |
| Universal New Release November 2006 | 2009 | Universal Music Thailand | "When Your Heart Stops Beating" |
| Skate Punk Anthems | 2016 | Universal Music Group | "When Your Heart Stops Beating" |
| Supergeil! Rock 'n' Roll | 2016 | Universal Music Strategic Marketing | "When Your Heart Stops Beating" |
| Skate Punk Anthems: 40 Pop Punk Smashes | 2017 | Universal Music Group | "When Your Heart Stops Beating" |
| MTV Rocks - Pop Punk Vs The World | 2018 | Universal Music On Demand | "When Your Heart Stops Beating" |

== Music videos ==
| Title | Year | Album | Director |
|---|---|---|---|
| "When Your Heart Stops Beating" | 2006 | When Your Heart Stops Beating | Liz Friedlander, Sheli Jury |
| "Chapter 13" | 2006 | When Your Heart Stops Beating | Jason Bergh, Jon Marc Sandifer |
| "155" | 2007 | When Your Heart Stops Beating | Haven |

== Digital download ==
- iTunes Foreign Exchange – cover of Wir sind Helden's song "Guten Tag"
- AOL Sessions EP – iTunes only EP featuring live performances
- "Lycanthrope" – offered as downloadable content for Guitar Hero World Tour

== Remixes ==
- "When Your Heart Stops Beating" (Electronic remix)
- "Little Death" (Chris Holmes mix)
