= Lycanthrope (song) =

Single by +44

from the album When Your Heart Stops Beating
- Released: September 1, 2006
- Recorded: 2005–2006; Opra Music (Los Angeles, California)
- Genre: Pop punk, punk rock
- Length: 3:57
- Label: Interscope
- Songwriters: Mark Hoppus, Travis Barker
- Producers: Mark Hoppus, Travis Barker, Jerry Finn (co-producer)

+44 singles chronology
"No, It Isn't" (2005)	"Lycanthrope" (2006)	"When Your Heart Stops Beating" (2006)

"Lycanthrope" is a song by American rock band +44, released on September 1, 2006 as the lead single from the group's debut studio album, When Your Heart Stops Beating (2006).

== Background ==
"Lycanthrope" is the opening track of the band's debut studio album, When Your Heart Stops Beating, and was intended to introduce the band but leave the listener guessing. The song has been described as "another vitriolic and dark track about things ending, loneliness, hollow words and feeling broken. The protagonist in the chorus says he's going to set the other person free and to just let things happen without being afraid—if they would only just stop talking. Despite initial protestations, it's another track that is surely directed toward [former bandmate Tom DeLonge], despite cover stories that Mark and Travis may have felt moved to offer along the way."

"Lycanthrope" was first released through the band's official website on September 1, 2006, to both give the fans a taste of the forthcoming material and "presumably to make their feelings on what had happened as clear as possible."

== Format and track listing ==
All lyrics written by Mark Hoppus, all music composed by +44.

CD promo (2006)

1. "Lycanthrope" – 3:57

7" picture disc (2006)

1. "Lycanthrope" – 3:57
2. "145" (Acoustic) – 3:35

7" UK vinyl (2006)

1. "Lycanthrope" – 3:57
2. "145" (Acoustic) – 3:35

== Personnel ==
+44

- Mark Hoppus – lead vocals, bass guitar, lyrics, additional guitar
- Shane Gallagher – lead guitar
- Travis Barker – drums, percussion
- Craig Fairbaugh – vocals, rhythm guitar, keyboards
