= When Your Heart Stops Beating (song) =

Single by +44

from the album When Your Heart Stops Beating
- Released: November 14, 2006
- Recorded: 2005–2006; Opra Music (Los Angeles, California)
- Genre: Pop-punk
- Length: 3:14
- Label: Interscope
- Songwriters: Mark Hoppus; Travis Barker
- Producers: Mark Hoppus; Travis Barker; Jerry Finn

+44 singles chronology
"Lycanthrope" (2006)	"When Your Heart Stops Beating" (2006)	"Baby Come On" (2007)

Alternate cover
- Used in some Asian and European countries

"When Your Heart Stops Beating" is a song by American rock supergroup +44, released on November 14, 2006, as the second single from the group's debut studio album, When Your Heart Stops Beating (2006). "When Your Heart Stops Beating" was released to radio on October 3, 2006. The song was the only single from the album to chart, peaking at number 14 on Billboard's Modern Rock Tracks chart.

== Background ==
The title track, "When Your Heart Stops Beating", features "snotty, mid-range British-sounding Telecasters" and was inspired by the story of Sid Vicious and Nancy Spungen — "you love your lady and outside of that, fuck everything else," according to Hoppus. Barker built the song around the driving bass drum beat: "I kind of approached it like a rock steady or like an old like four on the floor ska song, but played more like a rock drummer, like if a rock drummer was accidentally playing that stuff [...] It was kind of new wave and I felt like it needed a driving four on the floor." The track's percussion has been compared to that of Police drummer Stewart Copeland.

== Music video ==
The music video for "When Your Heart Stops Beating" was shot on September 9, 2006, in Los Angeles and directed by Liz Friedlander and Sheli Jury. +44 put out an open casting call for the group's fans to appear in the video. The video is a "pretty stock shoot of a group playing in an abandoned warehouse whilst all around people dance and couples are seen arguing."

The band embarked on a promotional tour of the United Kingdom in late 2006; Barker was in constant pain but soldiered through the performances, altering his kit set-up to accommodate. "He is now using his left foot as his right arm, Def Leppard style," confirmed Hoppus. A doctor informed Barker he had broken a bone in his arm during the band's video shoot and was instructed to immediately rest and not take part in the band's upcoming live dates, including early 2007 jaunts to Australia and Europe. Barker nevertheless took part, but after an excruciating Amsterdam gig, the band drafted Gil Sharone, then of The Dillinger Escape Plan, to fill-in for him.

== Format and track listing ==
All lyrics written by Mark Hoppus, all music composed by +44.

CD 1

1. "When Your Heart Stops Beating" – 3:14
2. "When Your Heart Stops Beating" (Electronic Remix) – 3:22
3. "145" – 3:40
4. "When Your Heart Stops Beating" (music video) – 3:09

CD 2

1. "When Your Heart Stops Beating" – 3:14
2. "Baby Come On" (AOL Sessions) – 2:47

CD promo

1. "When Your Heart Stops Beating" – 3:14

7" picture disc

1. "When Your Heart Stops Beating" – 3:14
2. "When Your Heart Stops Beating" (Electronic Mix) – 3:22

== Charts and certifications ==
=== Weekly charts ===
Chart (2006)	Current Position
Australia (ARIA)	47
Austria (Ö3 Austria Top 40)	74
Germany (GfK)	72
Ireland (IRMA)	47
UK Singles (OCC)	47
US Billboard Hot 100	89
US Alternative Airplay (Billboard)	14

== Personnel ==
+44

- Mark Hoppus – lead vocals, bass guitar, additional guitar
- Shane Gallagher – lead guitar
- Travis Barker – drums, percussion
- Craig Fairbaugh – vocals, rhythm guitar, keyboards
