= Mark Hoppus production discography =

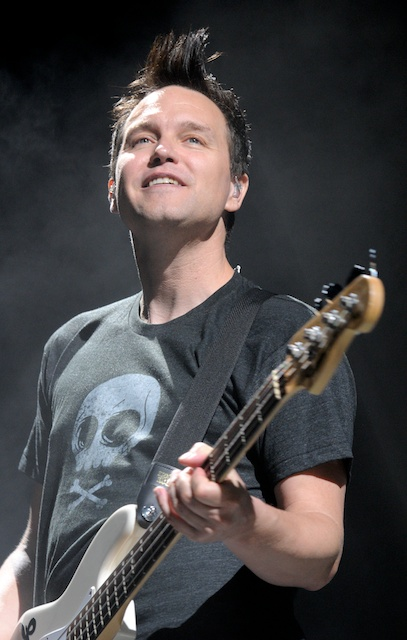
Hoppus performing in 2011

This is the production discography by Mark Hoppus, an American musician and record producer. It includes a list of various guest appearances, songs produced, co-produced, written and remixed by year, artist, album and title. This does not include his work with his main projects, including Blink-182, +44, and Simple Creatures.

Hoppus has collaborated with contemporary pop punk artists, including The All-American Rejects, All Time Low, Fall Out Boy, Motion City Soundtrack, New Found Glory, MxPx and Simple Plan, as well as newer artists such as Neck Deep and State Champs.

== Production discography ==
=== Guest appearances ===
Year	Album title	Artist	Record label	Credits	Source
1998	Look Forward to Failure	The Ataris	Fat Wreck Chords	Vocals on "That Special Girl"	
2002	No Pads, No Helmets...Just Balls	Simple Plan	Atlantic Records	Vocals on "I'd Do Anything"	
2002	Box Car Racer	Box Car Racer	MCA Records	Vocals on "Elevator"	
2002	Sticks and Stones	New Found Glory	Drive-Thru Records/MCA	Bass on "Something I Call Personality"	
2004	The Passion of the Christ: Songs	MxPx	Lost Keyword	Vocals on "Empire"	
2005	Panic	MxPx	SideOneDummy Records	Vocals on "Wrecking Hotel Rooms"	
2005	Commit This to Memory	Motion City Soundtrack	Epitaph Records	Vocals on "Hangman"	
2006	White Heat	Renee Renee	Sweet Ass Records	Vocals and bass on "Paper Doll"	
2007	Changes	Vanilla Sky	Universal Records	Vocals on "Nightmare"	
2009	Fired Up soundtrack	Richard Gibbs	Screen Gems	Co-wrote and vocals on "Until the Stars Fall"	
2010	Almost Alice	Various artists	Buena Vista	Vocal and Bass on "In Transit"	
2010	Pinch Me	Forget the Pacific	Self-released	Bass on "Sweet 16"	
2011	—^{[A]}	City (Comma) State	Self-released	Vocals on "You Crush My Heart"	
2011	What Are You So Scared Of?	Tonight Alive	Sony Music	Vocals on "Thank You & Goodnight'"	
2012	Shooting Star	Owl City	Universal Republic	Vocals on "Dementia"	
2012	The Midsummer Station	Owl City	Universal Republic	Vocals on "Dementia"	
2014	McBusted	McBusted	Island Records	Vocals on "Hate Your Guts"	
2014	Resurrection	New Found Glory	Hopeless Records	Vocals on "Ready And Willing II"	
2015	Future Hearts	All Time Low	Hopeless Records	Vocals on "Tidal Waves"	
2016	Life's Not Out to Get You	Neck Deep	Hopeless Records	Vocals on "December"	
2017	The Knife	Goldfinger	Rise Records	Vocals on "See You Around"	
2018	Love Monster	Amy Shark	Wonderlick Recording Company/Sony Music	Vocals on "Psycho"	
2018	Living Proof	State Champs	Pure Noise Records	Vocals on "Time Machine"	
2020	Non-album single	McFly	BMG Rights Management	Vocals on "Growing Up"	
2020	Heartwork	The Used	Big Noise Music Group	Vocals on "The Lighthouse"	
2020	Non-album single	Super Whatevr	Hopeless Records	Vocals on "Carhartts & Converse"	
2021	Nonfiction	Arrested Youth	Lowly	Vocals on "Find My Own Way"	
2021	Poser	Ricky Himself	Alamo Records/Sony Music Entertainment	Vocals on "Parasocial"	
2022	Non-album single	A Day to Remember	Fueled by Ramen	Vocals on "Re-Entry"	
2022	Love Sux	Avril Lavigne	DTA Records/Elektra Records	Vocals on "All I Wanted"	
2022	We Made Plans & God Laughed	Beauty School Dropout	Verswire	Vocals on "ALMOST FAMOUS"	
2022	It's Fine	Smrtdeath	Self-released	Vocals on "Adding Up"	

=== Producing ===
Year	Album title	Artist	Record label	Credits	Source
2005	Commit This to Memory	Motion City Soundtrack	Epitaph Records	Producer	
2006	Wake Up	Something for Rockets	Might As Well Music	Produced two songs	
2006	Decomposer	The Matches	Epitaph Records	Produced "What Katie Said", "Sunburn vs. the Rhinovirus", and "The Barber's Unhappiness"	
2006	We're Up to No Good, We're Up to No Good	Rory	111 Records	Producer	
2006	Punk Goes 90's	Various artists	Fearless Records	Produced Mae's cover of "March of the Pigs" by Nine Inch Nails	
2007	Wolves	Idiot Pilot	Reprise Records	Co-producer	
2007	One Track Mind	Something for Rockets	Might As Well Music	Producer	
2008	Spread The Rumors	Socratic	Drive-Thru Records	Producer	
2008	Our Lunar Activities	Our Lunar Activities		Producer	
2009	Lies Sell Stories	Koopa	Pied Piper Records	Producer	
2009	Not Without a Fight	New Found Glory	Epitaph Records	Producer	
2009	Not Without a Heart Once Nourished by Sticks and Stones Within Blood Ill-Tempered Misanthropy Pure Gold Can Stay	New Found Glory/Shai Hulud	Bridge 9 Records	Produced "Truck Stop Blues"	
2010	Pinch Me	Forget the Pacific	Self-released	Produced "Sweet 16"	
2010	My Dinosaur Life	Motion City Soundtrack	Columbia Records	Producer	
2011	The First Last EP	City (Comma) State		Producer	
2016	No Grace	PAWS	FatCat Records	Producer	
2020	"Crooked Ways"	Motion City Soundtrack	Boombox Generation	Producer	

=== Writing ===
Year	Album title	Artist	Record label	Credits
2006	In with the Out Crowd	Less Than Jake	Warner Bros. Records	Co-wrote "The Rest of My Life"
2009	Nothing Personal	All Time Low	Hopeless Records	Co-wrote one unreleased track
2011	The First Last EP	City (Comma) State		Writer and co-writer
2014	McBusted	McBusted	Island Records	Co-wrote "Hate Your Guts" and "Sensitive Guy"

=== Remixes ===
Year	Album title	Artist	Record label	Credits	Source
2009	"I Wanna (The Remixes)"	The All-American Rejects	DGC/Interscope Records	Remixed "I Wanna"	
2009	America's Suitehearts: Remixed, Retouched, Rehabbed and Retoxed	Fall Out Boy	Fueled by Ramen	Remixed "America's Suitehearts"	
2009	Michael Jackson: The Complete Remix Suite	The Jackson 5	Motown Records	Remixed "ABC" with Chris Holmes	
2010	Love	Angels & Airwaves	Self-released	Remixed "Hallucinations"	
2016	"Serpents"	Neck Deep	Hopeless Records	Remixed "Serpents" and "Can't Kick Up the Roots"	
2020	Non-album single	Hot Milk	Hopeless Records	Remixed "Candy Coated Lie$" with Mitchy Collins	
