= Baby Come On =

- American radio promo CD

Single by +44

from the album When Your Heart Stops Beating
- Released: February 20, 2007
- Recorded: 2005–2006
- Genre: Emo; pop punk
- Length: 2:46
- Label: Interscope
- Songwriters: Mark Hoppus; Travis Barker
- Producers: Mark Hoppus; Travis Barker; Jerry Finn (co-producer)

+44 singles chronology
"When Your Heart Stops Beating" (2006)	"Baby Come On" (2007)	"155" (2007)

"Baby Come On" is a song by American rock band +44, released in February 2007 as the third single from the group's debut studio album, When Your Heart Stops Beating (2006). The song impacted radio on February 20, 2007.

== Background ==
"Baby Come On" was written halfway through the recording process and serves as an assessment of "what the band is about." It contains electronic drums and synthesizers that thicken a slow build throughout the track. The lyric "The past is only the future with the lights on" has been cited as a standout; Hoppus elaborated on it on his personal Tumblr blog in 2011: "To me, it means: life is cyclical. People and situations change and come back again, and your experiences in the past give you foresight into the future before you. You can choose to change or break the cycle, or choose to let it happen again. That's what I interpret that line to mean."

In 2012, Hoppus remarked that "sometimes I feel like "Baby Come On" is the best song that I could ever write."

== Format and track listing ==
CD (2007)

1. "Baby Come On" – 2:46

== Personnel ==
+44

- Mark Hoppus – lead vocals, bass guitar, additional guitar
- Shane Gallagher – lead guitar
- Travis Barker – drums, percussion
- Craig Fairbaugh – vocals, rhythm guitar, keyboards

== Release history ==
Country	Date	Format	Label	Ref.
United States	February 20, 2007	Alternative radio	Interscope	
