= When Your Heart Stops Beating =

- Released in three different colors: blue, pink, and green.

Studio album by +44
- Released: November 13, 2006
- Recorded: April 2005 – June 2006
- Studios: Opra Music (Los Angeles, California); Henson Studios (Los Angeles, California)
- Genres: Pop-punk; emo pop; alternative rock
- Length: 44:00
- Label: Interscope
- Producers: Mark Hoppus; Travis Barker; Jerry Finn

Singles from When Your Heart Stops Beating
- 1. "Lycanthrope" Released: September 1, 2006; 2. "When Your Heart Stops Beating" Released: November 14, 2006; 3. "Baby Come On" Released: February 20, 2007; 4. "155" Released: 2007

When Your Heart Stops Beating is the only album by the American rock supergroup +44, released on November 13, 2006, by Interscope Records. Formed in 2005 by Mark Hoppus and Travis Barker after Blink-182's breakup, +44 began as an electronic-leaning experiment before expanding into a full band with guitarists Shane Gallagher and Craig Fairbaugh. Conceived during a period of personal and professional upheaval, the album channels the aftermath of the breakup into a sound that fuses guitar-driven pop-punk with gothic new wave, '80s synth textures, and extensive use of keyboards, samples, and programmed beats.

Written largely in basements, dining rooms, and later their own North Hollywood studio, Hoppus described the writing as the most direct of his career—raw, bitter, and transparent about the implosion of his former band and the uncertainty that followed. Its songs toggle between moody electronic passages and explosive rock arrangements, often built on soft-verse/loud-chorus dynamics. Critics noted shades of the Cure, Missing Persons, and the Postal Service. Jerry Finn, who had worked extensively with Blink-182, served as co-producer.

Although anticipated by music press, When Your Heart Stops Beating entered the Billboard 200's top ten yet ultimately fell short of commercial expectations. It received mixed to positive reviews, many praising its honesty and atmosphere while others criticized its proximity to Blink-182's formula. Main singles included the title track, "Lycanthrope" and "Baby Come On". +44 embarked on a worldwide touring schedule across clubs and theaters to support the album. Plans for a second album were scrapped when Hoppus and Barker reunited Blink-182 in 2009.

== Background ==
By 2004, Blink-182, consisting of bassist Mark Hoppus, guitarist Tom DeLonge, and drummer Travis Barker, had achieved significant commercial success in the mainstream. The band had taken a brief break in late 2001 when DeLonge suffered a herniated disc in his back, during which time he collected several darker musical ideas he felt unsuitable for Blink-182, compiling them into a record, Box Car Racer. The album, recorded with the help of Hazen Street guitarist and longtime friend David Kennedy, was intended as a one-time experimental project but evolved into a full-fledged band upon Barker's involvement. The side project would cause great division between DeLonge and Hoppus, who felt "betrayed." Blink-182 regrouped in 2003 to record and release their eponymous fifth studio album, which, not unlike Box Car Racer, reflected what critics believed to be a darker, more experimental tone.

The trio embarked on a European tour the following autumn. DeLonge became uncomfortable with the hefty touring schedule, during which he was unable to see his family. He eventually expressed his desire to take a half-year respite from touring in order to spend more time with family. Hoppus and Barker protested his decision, which they felt was an overly long break. DeLonge did not blame his bandmates for being disappointed with his requests, but was dismayed that they could not seemingly understand. In addition, DeLonge protested the idea of Barker's reality television series, Meet the Barkers, which was being produced for a 2005 premiere. DeLonge disliked television cameras everywhere, feeling his personal privacy was invaded. Following the 2004 Indian Ocean earthquake, DeLonge agreed to perform at Music for Relief's Concert for South Asia, a benefit show to aid victims. Further arguments ensued during rehearsals, rooted in the band member's increasing paranoia and bitterness toward one another. He considered his bandmates priorities "mad, mad different", and the breakdown in communication led to heated exchanges, resulting in his exit from the group. Geffen announced on February 22, 2005 that Blink-182 would be going on an "indefinite hiatus." Label president Jordan Schur reportedly advised Barker to downplay events in the press.

Hoppus and Barker began developing new songs with near immediacy following the band's implosion, recording in Barker's basement and Hoppus' dining room. The two musicians experimented with electronic drums, samples, keyboards and direct computer recordings during this period. These recordings were ambient and quiet by necessity. "We were recording and we didn't want the cops showing up at our house at 2 a.m. because we recording drums," remembered Hoppus. While away on a trip in April 2005, Hoppus participated in an interview with MTV News in which he revealed the band's existence, saying "Right now, Travis and I are using the time off to start this project called Plus-44 […] It's very exciting, like a breath of fresh air." When the two regrouped, they decided to stop giving interviews about the new project. "It was strange to be talking about music that we were just in the very first steps of writing," recalled Hoppus. "It didn’t feel right to talk about yet." The band's name is a reference to the country code needed when placing a phone call to the United Kingdom, where Hoppus and Barker first discussed making music alone. "When we first started talking about ever doing anything outside of Blink was on the last European tour where Tom was telling us that he needed to take a year off from the band. […] We never did anything about it until Tom quit the band, but that's where it first started," said Hoppus.

== Recording and production ==
The original +44 logo, utilized in many promotional kits for the record.

The addition of other members to +44 came gradually. Both Hoppus and Barker were wary of making their new outfit anything like their previous band, and Barker suggested adding a woman to the fold would "really change it up". He invited his friend Carol Heller of the all-girl punk quartet Get the Girl to write with the band. Barker had first met Heller in his early days living with promoter Bill Fold. Heller shared vocals with Hoppus on most of the band's early demos. Meanwhile, Hoppus invited friend Shane Gallagher to play guitar on a few tracks the band began working on, and he soon joined the group. Barker had previously been in one of his first bands, Doyt, with Gallagher, though it "never got out of [his] garage". In developing the songs, Hoppus found that working without DeLonge, his longtime creative partner, created unfamiliar terrain. Hoppus admits in his memoir that he came to recognize how much he relied on their musical dialogue: the friendly competition, the mutual challenge to improve, and the instinctive ability they had to elevate one another's ideas. In DeLonge's absence, Hoppus frequently questioned his own instincts and talent, wondering whether he had contributed as much to blink-182 as he thought. Barker remained committed to the project, but he was also navigating multiple responsibilities—producing hip-hop, launching clothing brands, and filming a reality TV show—which added pressure to an already delicate rebuilding process.

Production on the record moved along swiftly once the duo purchased their own North Hollywood studio, which they dubbed Opra Music. The space—which featured two recording rooms, a lounge and a small outdoor courtyard—was purchased in October 2005 from former Poison guitarist Richie Kotzen. After moving all band gear into the new recording center, the entire direction for the band changed course significantly, opting for a more rock-based sound. Hoppus and Barker had believed the electronic elements would always be a startup method and nothing more; Hoppus told label executives near the beginning of the project that "We’re just using these tools at the beginning to start off this thing." Heller became uneasy with the new direction and, with a desire to start a family, parted ways with the band by the end of the year. Barker admitted the chemistry between Heller and the rest of the band was never truly there. Shortly afterward, friend Craig Fairbaugh came in to observe and listen and play to songs; he was later asked to become the fourth member of the group. Fairbaugh had previously toured as a guitarist for the Transplants.

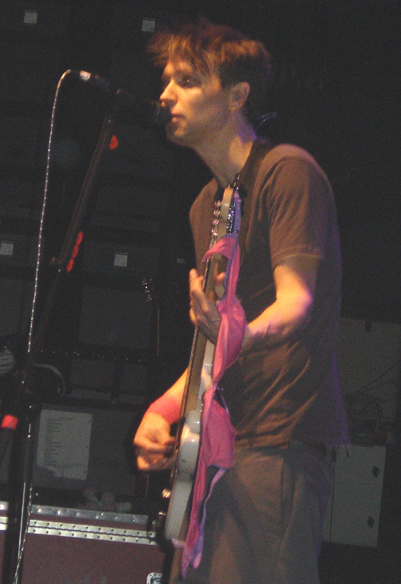
+44 was Mark Hoppus's first time fronting a band solo, stepping into the role of lead vocalist and primary songwriter.

In February 2006, the band began recording "in earnest" for the record. The band considered many producers for the album, among those Danger Mouse. Eventually, the record was produced by Hoppus and Barker, with longtime associate and friend Jerry Finn in the role of executive producer. Finn came in late into production to oversee completion, but eventually contributed heavily to the album's writing. Producer Dan the Automator was called in to "tinker" with a track. Upon completion, the record's tentative title was Little Death. By August, the band decided on naming the album When Your Heart Stops Beating. "We always thought of the phrase 'when your heart stops beating' as capturing the good and the bad in the world in everything," said Hoppus of the title. "When you fall in love with a lady and your heart skips a beat or something great happens. And also, obviously, when your heart stops beating, the end of things."

Most of the songs on the album were recorded live. Barker programmed his electronic parts on the SP-1200 drum machine. There were several songs that did not make the final cut, including an uplifting "indie country" track that was among the last to be developed. The album artwork and photography were created by Estavan Oriol. The artwork of the jewel case pictures the words "When Your Heart Stops Beating" in black with the letters "ART" of "heart" standing out in blue.

== Composition ==
=== Music ===
"Baby Come On"
This sample of "Baby Come On" showcases both the band's electronic influences and soft verse/loud chorus dynamic.

Musically, +44 was envisioned as a natural extension of the songwriting evolution Hoppus and Barker had begun in blink-182—melding punk roots with electronic textures and elements of '80s new wave. The music of the album is influenced by artists such as the Postal Service, Missing Persons, and the Cure. The album experiments with unusual song structure and temperaments, and the first six tracks of the album alternate between uptempo rock songs and ballads. Many songs feature a dynamic utilizing soft verses and louder choruses. According to Corey Apar of AllMusic, +44's original electronic influence is evident in the music, although it has "ultimately [taken] a backseat to guitar-driven rock". The tone of the album has been described as "consistently upbeat," showcasing a variety of influences.

Lyrically, Hoppus described the material as the most direct and emotionally transparent he had ever written, fueled by resentment, loss, and the sense of having to rebuild after the collapse of the band that had defined his life. "Lyrically, it's some of the most positive stuff I've ever written, but it's also some of the darkest shit, too," he said. The album is composed of both dark and introspective songs, but also upbeat and "positive" tracks. For Barker, the writing of the record's lyrics was inspired by the "roller coaster" of new opportunities while starting a new band, such as writing a new song or playing a first show. The feeling is echoed throughout When Your Heart Stops Beating, and Barker described the feeling of the album as being transported to a different place. "To me, it brings up feelings of, like, driving too fast or skateboarding down the street in the middle of the night," Barker commented.

Genre-wise, Bryan of Punknews.org described When Your Heart Stops Beating as "energetic and catchy pop-punk" and containing "melodic, atmospheric ballads". Ben Yates of Drowned in Sound felt that the album started strong with Blink-182-esque songs, however delved into "emo choruses and handed-down pop-punk riffs" for the bulk of the tracklist. Kill Your Stereo described the album as emo pop, while Apar of felt it was alternative rock.

=== Song analysis ===
A lot of the record is about finding strength in hard times and finding strength in people that you love. In a lot of ways it has been a very downer past two years, but it's been a very great last two years [too]. Obviously we would never have wished for Blink to end, but it did and we were dealt a hand of cards that we picked up.

— Hoppus in 2006 on the album's theme

The record opens with "Lycanthrope", which was intended to introduce the band but leave the listener guessing. "Baby Come On" was written halfway through the recording process and serves as an assessment of "what the band is about." It contains electronic drums and synthesizers that thicken a slow build throughout the track. The title track, "When Your Heart Stops Beating", features "snotty, mid-range British-sounding Telecasters" and was inspired by the story of Sid Vicious and Nancy Spungen — "you love your lady and outside of that, fuck everything else," according to Hoppus. "Little Death" is a moody, lo-fi song that went through numerous changes throughout the recording, beginning in Barker's basement. It was intended as an allegory to what Hoppus and Barker dealt with after the breakup of Blink-182. Hoppus felt both "hopeful and defeated" while writing the song, and intended to make it an appreciation of life after hard events. In addition, he was inspired by the various methods of communication in the 21st century, and how they can often result in too much or too little conversation, especially among loved ones.

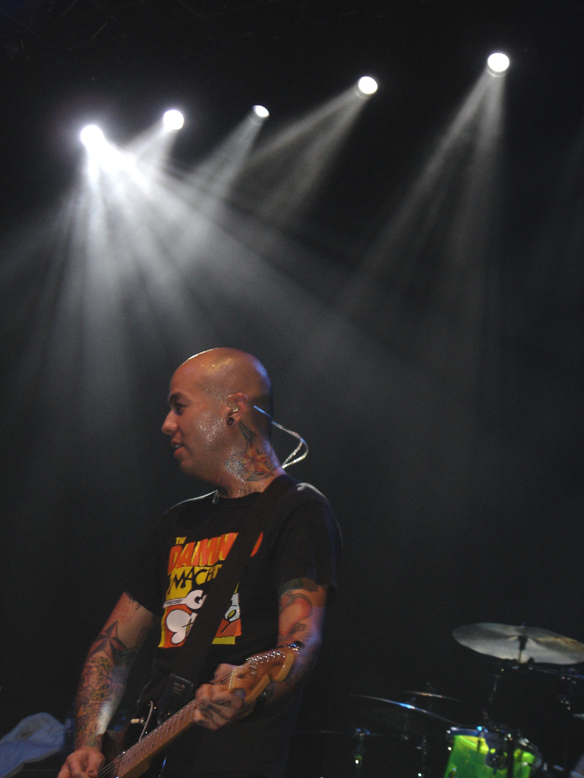
Shane Gallagher performing with the band in 2007.

"155" is a heavily layered synth-driven track that contains handclaps and "Cure-esque guitars." The handclaps were Barker's idea, who noticed its prevalence in hip-hop songs and wanted to incorporate into a rock song. "Lillian" features programmed drums and acoustic guitars, and was inspired by Hoppus' residence in San Diego, before the move to Los Angeles. "I lived in a part of San Diego that's one of the most beautiful places in the country, but it's also one of the most evil sickening places," said Hoppus. "People are just ugly to one another." The title was inspired by a woman who started a strict homeowners association in the city. "Cliff Diving" was inspired by Hoppus' teenage summers growing up, where he would embark upon his friend's house and dive into the pool from the rooftop. The track is therefore about "embracing the unknown," further incorporating influence from the breakup of Blink-182 and the beginnings of +44. "Interlude" is most representative of the earliest work Hoppus and Barker put together. It was placed as a musical break to separate the upbeat pop punk track "Cliffdiving" and the record's "darkest" song, "Weatherman". That track is another early composition that was written directly following the breakup of Blink-182. "I was driving to Travis' house and the whole Blink thing had just gone down […] We had been talking about making a really dark, dirty song." The song was launched from the line "Just let me slip away, I'm barely holding on," and the music was intended to reflect that theme.

The song most directly inspired by the end of Blink-182 is "No, It Isn't", which was also inspired by feelings of betrayal afterward. "[The song] is about coming out a year later and telling the truth," Barker said. "For a year, people were saying that what Tom did was valid or called for. It eats at you. So maybe you have to talk about it, and maybe you have to write a song about it." The Postal Service influence is noticeable in "Make You Smile", which makes frequent use of boy-girl exchange and lament. The song was initially dubbed "Puppy Killing Machine" — a name created by Heller that Hoppus deemed "so ridiculous" in relation to its upbeat, poppy nature. The anthemic "Chapter 13" closes the record and was inspired from chapter 13 of Dante's Inferno, which revolves around suicide. "I had this image in my head of a guy seeing a woman across a crowded room and in that instant, he knows exactly what's going to happen: He falls in love with her, goes crazy, and kills himself in a hotel room," said Hoppus. "That's a good way to end the album, huh?"

== Promotion ==
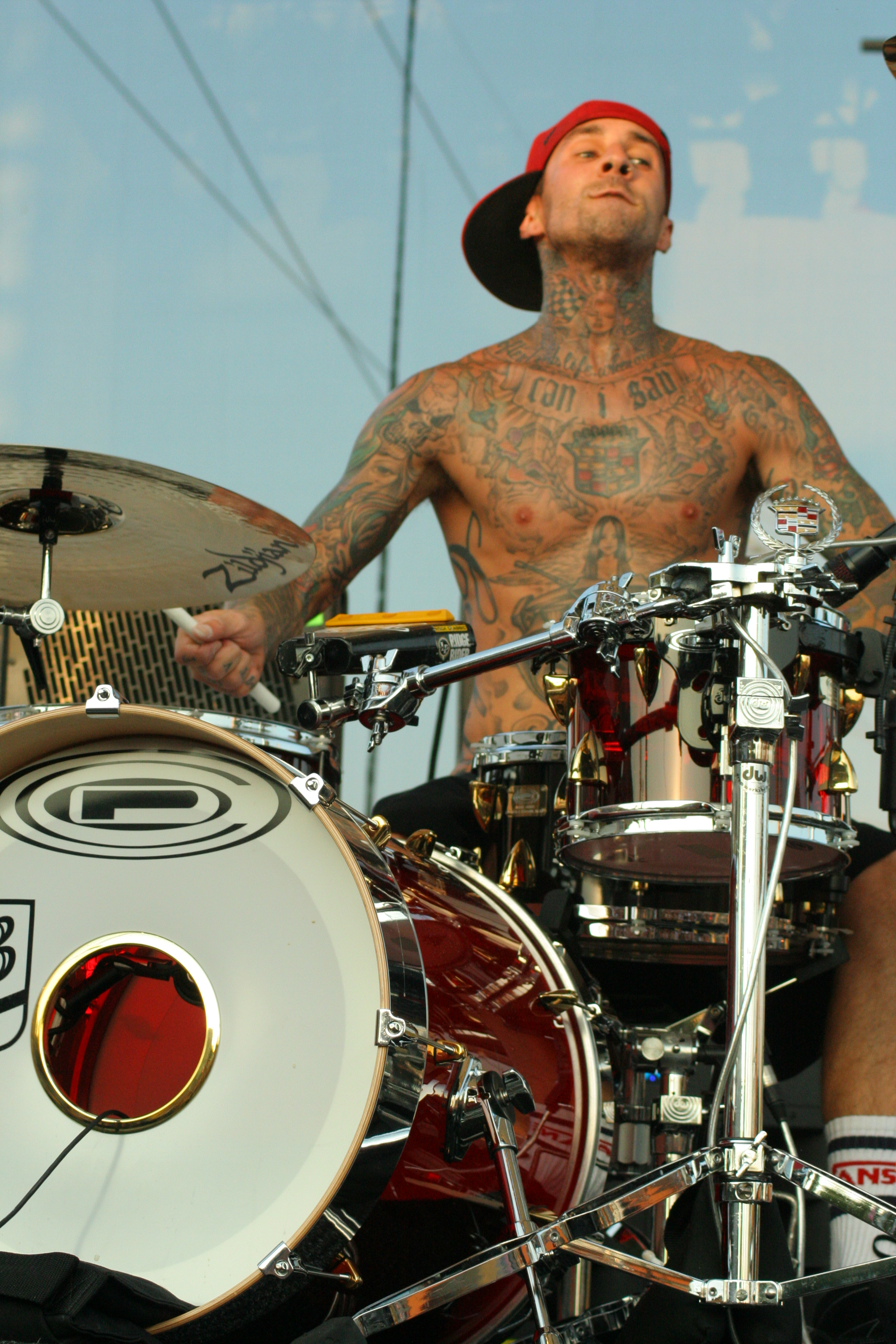
Travis Barker preferred keeping a low profile during promotion, avoiding interviews and letting the music speak for itself rather than engaging in media hype.

The release date for When Your Heart Stops Beating was heavily anticipated and publicized by the music press. As early as August 2005, Internet rumors began to circulate that the album would be released in January 2006 although the band's management denied the claims. Thanks to the duo's lack of press interviews, misinformation spread via the Internet in the months prior to the record's release, including fake songs purporting to be leaked tracks. "It's kind of flattering that some kids would go out there and post songs under our name," Barker added. "I mean, at least it means that people are excited to hear our stuff." "No, It Isn't" leaked in December 2005 and caused speculation as it addressed the break-up of Blink-182 head-on.

Hoppus did not give any formal interviews before shortly prior to the release of the album, instead spending time updating his blog, producing tracks for Motion City Soundtrack, and working on the album in relative secrecy. "During that time, their former bandmate, Tom DeLonge, did the opposite, peppering blogs and magazines with quotes hyping his new band and putting the blame for the Blink situation squarely on their shoulders," reported James Montgomery of MTV News. While it "pained" them to do so, Hoppus and Barker refrained from speaking to media, instead focusing on the recording process. "We just bit our tongues and didn't say anything, and now that the record is done, we get the chance to tell the truth about everything," Hoppus said. "We were silent for a year, and we couldn't put into words what we were doing, so we just decided not to say anything and let the music speak for itself," Barker added. "Now it's time for people to hear that music and hear the truth."

Commercially and logistically, +44 represented a sharp reset. In his memoir, Hoppus notes that the band no longer benefited from Blink-182’s built-in momentum: radio stations that once championed Blink now required constant promotion, and early performances ranged from small showcases to radio-station events far removed from the scale he was used to. Hoppus writes that the contrast highlighted how far he had fallen in the music industry and how much work it would take to re-establish himself: "All the supports and safety nets we had in place were suddenly gone. [...] People knew the name blink-182, but who the hell was +44? It felt like I was giving the world a math problem."

== Reception ==
=== Commercial performance ===
When Your Heart Stops Beating debuted at number 10 on the Billboard 200 in the United States on November 22, 2006, moving 66,000 copies in its opening week. It also peaked at number two on the magazine's Top Rock Albums chart, and at number eight on the Canadian Albums Chart. It debuted at number 22 on the ARIA Albums Chart in Australia, representing its highest peak internationally. It peaked at position 30 on the Offizielle Top 100 in Germany, number 36 in Austria's Ö3 Austria Top 40 Longplay chart, and at number 50 on the UK Albums Chart.

As of September 2011, the album has sold over 274,000 copies in the US.

=== Critical response ===
Professional ratings
Aggregate scores
Source	Rating
Metacritic	60/100
Review scores
Source	Rating
AbsolutePunk	(83%)
AllMusic	3.5/5 stars
Blender	3/5 stars
Entertainment Weekly	B+
Kerrang!	2/5 stars
The New York Times	(favorable)
Rolling Stone	2.5/5 stars
The Washington Post	(favorable)
MSN Music (Consumer Guide)	(choice cut)

The album received mixed to positive reviews from music critics. At Metacritic, which assigns a normalized rating out of 100 to reviews from mainstream critics, the album received an average score of 60, based on 11 reviews, which indicates "mixed or average reviews". AbsolutePunk's Drew Beringer deemed the album "a very diverse and potent debut album", and suggesting it as "one of the most honest records of 2006". The Washington Post described +44 as being in the same spirit as Blink-182 ("adorable, cuddly pop punk") and The Gauntlet called the record the best post-Blink project. Jenny Eliscu of Rolling Stone criticized the album's lack of electronic content, and dismissed much of its content as derivative of Blink-182. Trevor Baker of Rock Sound deemed the album "by far the most personal, vitriolic, and self-indulgent thing that Mark and Travis have ever done. In a good way and in a bad way."

Pat Revyr of Deseret News named When Your Heart Stops Beating superior to former bandmate Tom DeLonge's new project, Angels & Airwaves' We Don't Need to Whisper, and Kelefa Sanneh of The New York Times described it as "zippier and catchier" than Whisper. Both Rolling Stone and The New York Times opined that both groups, however, paled in comparison to Blink-182. In contrast to The Daily Princetonian citing +44 for "lacking originality", The Avion Newspaper declared the band as "undoubtedly original [...] and sure to please with every track". Channing Freeman of Sputnikmusic called the album "standard pop punk music", stating it was not a large departure from Blink-182. NME wrote that "There are more ideas here than Blink-182 had in an entire career [...] It's just that they're the same ideas that Jimmy Eat World had on their last LP." Q was particularly underwhelmed by the record, criticizing Hoppus's vocals: "Hoppus, whose flat vocals once dovetailed deftly with [Tom] DeLonge's nasal whine, is sorely exposed as a sole frontman."

Ian Winwood of Kerrang! deemed the music boring, writing, "+44 are accomplished and adept, and sometimes they're even very good. But never, not once, are they exciting."

== Touring ==
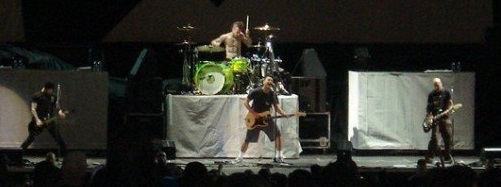
+44 performing in 2006.

The tour in support of When Your Heart Stops Beating served as the band's sole major outing before the project came to an end. +44's first show took place at the Roxy Theatre in Hollywood on September 7, 2006 with a second appearance following at the London Astoria. The band embarked on a promotional tour of the United Kingdom shortly thereafter. Barker broke a bone in his arm during the band's music video shoot but managed to complete the performances, altering his kit set-up to accommodate. "He is now using his left foot as his right arm, Def Leppard style," confirmed Hoppus. Doctors advised Barker to rest and not take part in the band's upcoming live dates, including early 2007 jaunts to Australia and Europe. Ultimately, Barker took part for three shows, but following a performance in Amsterdam, the band invited Gil Sharone, then of the Dillinger Escape Plan, to fill-in for the remainder of the dates. The tour continued in Australia and Japan, where the band busied themselves with press junkets and appearances. Crowds were, according to journalist Joe Shooman, mainly Blink-182 fans.

In his later memoir, Hoppus described touring for +44 as difficult. While he outwardly maintained that he enjoyed the return to smaller clubs at the time, it was a largely demoralizing affair. When the band headlined its own shows, they were often in the same clubs and theaters blink-182 had played a decade earlier. Financially, the tours were tough; according to Hoppus, most of them lost significant amounts of money, even as the band operated with a stripped-down crew and minimal production. For Hoppus, the entire experience underscored how dramatically his career had shifted. The band's last major tour, the Honda Civic Tour, took place from April to June 2007 across the US and Canada alongside Fall Out Boy, the Academy Is… and Paul Wall. The band began including Blink songs—"What's My Age Again?" and "The Rock Show"—into setlists, despite the band's stance against doing so months before. "Travis and I love our history with Blink-182, and it seems a shame to let those songs sit dormant forever because of what happened two years ago," said Hoppus on his blog. Hoppus later joined Panic! at the Disco on one date for an acoustic run-through of "What's My Age Again?".

Further August 2007 dates were postponed for unclear reasons; Hoppus stated the band had decided to re-enter the studio in preparation of a second studio album. Blink-182 reunited in February 2009 and Hoppus confirmed in an interview with Alternative Press that +44 was on hiatus: "I don't consider it done. We'll never say never with anything," he remarked. "As soon as you say, 'I'm not gonna do that anymore,' you find yourself in a situation where you wanna do that. Shane [Gallagher] and Craig [Fairbaugh] are awesome guitarists and great fun to play in a band with, so we definitely won't say that the band is done. But obviously, for the foreseeable future, all of our energy is going into Blink-182."

== Track listing ==
=== Original release ===
All lyrics are written by Mark Hoppus; all music is composed by +44.

When Your Heart Stops Beating
No.	Title	Length
1.	"Lycanthrope"	3:57
2.	"Baby Come On"	2:46
3.	"When Your Heart Stops Beating"	3:12
4.	"Little Death"	4:05
5.	"155"	3:29
6.	"Lillian"	4:38
7.	"Cliffdiving"	3:44
8.	"Interlude"	1:12
9.	"Weatherman"	4:33
10.	"No, It Isn't"	3:32
11.	"Make You Smile"	3:44
12.	"Chapter 13"	5:09
Total length:		44:00

Bonus tracks

International bonus track
No.	Title	Length
14.	"Baby Come On" (acoustic)	2:52

Japanese and UK bonus tracks
No.	Title	Length
15.	"Weatherman" (acoustic)	4:21

- Japanese release includes the "When Your Heart Stops Beating" music video.

== Personnel ==
+44

- Mark Hoppus – lead vocals, bass guitar, additional guitar, producer
- Shane Gallagher – lead guitar
- Travis Barker – drums, percussion, keyboards, producer
- Craig Fairbaugh – vocals, rhythm guitar, keyboards

Additional musicians

- Carol Heller – rhythm guitar, vocals, and additional writing on "No, It Isn't" and "Make You Smile"
- Chris Holmes – additional keyboards and programming
- Dan the Automator – additional keyboards and programming
- Kevin Bivona – additional keyboards and programming

Artwork

- Chris Siglin & Maxx242 – album art
- Estevan Oriol – photography

Production

- Jerry Finn – co-producer, mixing
- Chris Holmes – engineer, mixing on "Interlude"
- James Ingram – assistant engineer
- Chris Lord-Alge – mixing on "155"
- Brian Gardner – mastering
- Mark Williams – A&R

Management

- Eric Hellman, Irving Azoff and Jonathan Kalter – Management for Azoffmusic
- Peter Paterno and Leslie Frank – Legal for King
- Darryl Eaton – Booking for CAA
- Steve Zapp & Rod MacSween – International booking for ITB
- Chris Siglin & Bruce Fingeret – Merchandise for FEA
- Mike Harris & Andy Harrison, Terry Doty & Gary Haber – Accounting for Paragon Business Management, Haber Corporation

== Charts ==
=== Weekly charts ===
Chart (2006)	Peak position
Australian Albums (ARIA)	22
Austrian Albums (Ö3 Austria)	36
Canadian Albums (Billboard)	8
French Albums (SNEP)	134
German Albums (Offizielle Top 100)	30
Italian Albums (FIMI)	74
Scottish Albums (Official Charts)	46
Swiss Albums (Schweizer Hitparade)	79
UK Albums (Official Charts)	50
US Billboard 200	10
US Top Rock Albums (Billboard)	2

== Notes ==
=== Sources ===
- Shooman, Joe (June 24, 2010). Blink-182: The Bands, The Breakdown & The Return. Independent Music Press. ISBN 978-1-906191-10-8.
- Griffin, JR (December 2006). "Blink & You'll Miss It". Alternative Press. No. 221. Alternative Magazines Inc. pp. 136–140. ISSN 1065-1667.
- Hoppus, Mark; Ozzi, Dan (April 8, 2025). Fahrenheit-182: A Memoir. Little, Brown Book Group Limited. ISBN 978-1-4087-2455-2.
