= The Nervous Return =

American punk band

- Origin: Los Angeles, California, United States
- Genres: New wave, post-punk, post-punk revival
- Years active: 2000–2006, 2018–present
- Labels: LaSalle, Mootron, Psychic Noise
- Members: Jason Muller; Anthony Crouse; Greg Gordon
- Past members: Shane Gallagher; Allison Ables; Rob Grad; Lance Webber; Marc Hutner

The Nervous Return is an American new wave/post-punk band from Los Angeles. Noted for their electrifying and unpredictable live shows, the band has toured Europe and North America headlining their own club tours as well as supporting arena tours with well-known acts such as No Doubt and Blink 182. They are also known for the diverse and eclectic bands they shared the stage with including Autolux, Hella, Imperial Teen, Har Mar Superstar, Electric Six, xbxrx, 400 Blows, The 88, The Make-Up, Trans Am, The Used, and Enon. They have released two EPs and one studio album. Their self-proclaimed best effort was their last recording (144 HOURS) that was unreleased until December 28, 2018, when the band finally released it themselves. The band broke up in April 2006 and reformed in 2018.

== Band history ==
=== Origins ===
twig!

the Nervous Return was formed in the spring of 2000 by Jason (guitar/vocals), Anthony Crouse (bass/vocals) and Greg Gordon (drums). Jason and Anthony had been playing together in Skinchurch, a Gothic rock/Industrial metal band in the mid-1990s. Skinchurch released one album, Of Whores and Martyrs in 1995. The band featured Jason dressed as a gothic transvestite who frequently spit fake blood and simulated vulgar acts on-stage not unlike Marilyn Manson. Soon, Skinchurch fizzled out while Jason and Anthony indulged their love of 1970s Funk and Glam rock as Skinchurch evolved into "Izzy the Pusher", a glamorous space rock phenomenon in Hollywood, California, during 1996–1999. Izzy the Pusher broke up in 1999 as Anthony pursued electronic music and Jason pursued various ill-fated Prince-influenced solo efforts.

After a year of separation, the two decided to start another band. Anthony and Jason became roommates to save money and lived on Silverlake Blvd. in Silverlake, Los Angeles, California. After finding Greg Gordon (at a local bar called The Dragonfly) to play the drums, the Nervous Return (then known as "twig") quickly recorded their eponymous five-song EP on their own Psychic Noise Records. A mix of pop music, post-punk and new wave music, this recording included five original songs and featured the first of many guitar players, Marc Hutner, who also played with Pleasure Club. the Nervous Return played shows in Los Angeles trying to build a following and booked small tours up and down the west coast establishing a reputation for high-energy and electrifying live shows. During this period, there was another band playing in Los Angeles under the name "The Twigs". This band owned the legal right to the name and began legal proceedings forcing "twig" to change their name. The band settled on "the Nervous Return".

"twig" poster

They played with many great, diverse, and eclectic bands. One of the most memorable shows was also one of their first shows. This local concert took place at the Silverlake Lounge with a new band called Autolux. This was Autolux's second show and they made a lasting impression on the members of the Nervous Return. Building a reputation of explosive live performances, the band played anywhere and everywhere trying to build a loyal following while honing their skills.

The band was an independent self-promoting DIY machine that plastered Los Angeles with fliers for upcoming shows and their self-titled EP. The group was notorious for wheat-pasting large black and white posters displaying a creepy country road with menacing dying trees on either side and the name "twig" typed in lowercase letters across the top. These were mercilessly posted on public electrical boxes, telephone poles, and other public venues. These posters can also be seen in the background of the first scene in the Goldie Hawn film The Banger Sisters.

=== Headshots ===
Rare cover under the name "twig". Less than 50 of these covers exist as the band changed the name and replaced "twig" with "the Nervous Return"

In the summer of 2002, the Nervous Return released their first album, Headshots, on Mootron Records, the indie rock/pop brainchild of Courtney Holt (Interscope Geffen A&M Records) and Mickey P.. Mootron's other artists include Big Sir, Old Hickory, Sissy Bar, Campfire Girls and The 88.

The album was generally well received by critics and fans alike although the album would not find commercial success. The controversial cover art of the U.S.A. version did not help matters and garnered the group some bad press in America. The cover art, coupled with the lyrics and intense music, was conceived by the band to comment on the illusion of Hollywood excess, the idiotic search for fame and fortune, and the depression that often occurs when those fantasies go unrealized. The cover is an actress’ headshot (albeit, she is suggestively holding a gun in her mouth), the liner notes resemble her resume and the back cover represents her distorted vision of the Hollywood illusion.

The band continued to play relentlessly in local clubs, booking shows constantly. As a result, they continued to develop a strong underground following and had the opportunity to play with some of the most diverse and exciting bands around. On August 24, 2003, the band was invited to play the Sunset Junction Street Fair, an annual event that takes place in Silverlake, Los Angeles, California. The two-day event is an explosion of street vendors, gay and lesbian residents, Latino residents, drunks, freaks, weirdos, and the most exciting bands in the city of Los Angeles. The line-up that day included the Nervous Return, Silversun Pickups, Earlimart, The 88, Midnight Movies, Rilo Kiley, The Dandy Warhols, and Autolux.

=== Snow in Berlin ===
By this time, the band had gone through a rotating cast of no less than six guitar players including the original member, Marc Hutner. Some say this rivals heavy mock group Spinal Tap and their endless list of drummers. With the album artwork changed to a ghostly figure in an alley, Headshots was released in Europe in winter of 2003. The addition of guitarist number seven, Shane Gallagher, synchronized with the immediate success of the European release of Headshots on one of Germany's most credible independent rock labels, Nois-o-lution records. This set the stage for the band's path to infamy overseas. The international publication Kerrang! gave Headshots 4 "Ks" calling it "a flashing Day-Glo explosion of twisted pop intellect that manages to challenge without ever losing sight of an infectious and melodic hook." The album was very well received by critics and fans alike in Europe and the band embarked on a six-week club tour in early 2005.

The tour was a success and all of the club shows were very well attended. The band gained a reputation for unpredictable and exciting live shows as Jason would get naked, spit on, and tackle band members and audience members alike. These antics were very well received by fans yet this behavior began to wear thin on the members of the band and particularly, Anthony. The album sold much better in Europe than in America as the band spent its sixth week on tour supporting pop-punk act Blink 182. A string of seven sold out dates gave the band the chance to play some of England's finest venues including Wembley Arena and Hammersmith Apollo.

=== Wake Up Dead ===
After returning from tour in spring 2004, the band signed a record deal with La Salle records, owned by Travis Barker of Blink 182. When asked what spurred the creation of La Salle, Barker was straight and to the point: "I wanted to put out great music. What artist wouldn't want to help another artist with creative freedom? I saw The Nervous Return 4 years ago and they were the reason I started a label in the first place." The band spent the next few months writing and rehearsing for their upcoming record. They took a break to do a three-week tour with No Doubt and Blink 182 in late May/early June at Travis' request. Wake Up Dead was recorded in the summer of 2004 and released in September 2004. The band was poised for commercial success.

The album garnered rave reviews from both mainstream and independent critics across America. Their friend and publicist, Josh Mills, lent a helping hand in this endeavor. The band also sent the record to college radio stations nationwide and rose to No. 70 on the CMJ college radio charts. In their usual DIY fashion, the band and their manager, worked tirelessly to promote the record to radio and press. As the band struggled to find support slots on upcoming tours without the help of a booking agent, they played locally in Southern California throughout the winter of 2004 and the spring of 2005. The album did not sell well and the excitement grew into apathy as the band realized they were witnessing the soft demise of their high hopes. This quiet five-month decline affected the band negatively as they had built a heated momentum the past 10–12 months culminating with the release of their first album. During this time, the band continuously wrote new material in anticipation of recording a new record.

Still discouraged with lackluster album sales and having trouble finding bands to tour with, the band decided to book their own nationwide tour with L.A. friends The Vacation. Their friend/booking agent James Harding was persuaded to help with the arduous process of booking a national tour. The "Resisting Arrest" tour of 2005 took the band across America throughout June and July. The band did not have much money and frequently slept on fans' floors when they weren't all sharing two double beds in one Motel 6 room. The bands thoroughly enjoyed touring together and dubbed the tour a success despite low attendance and severe loss of money.

=== 144 Hours ===
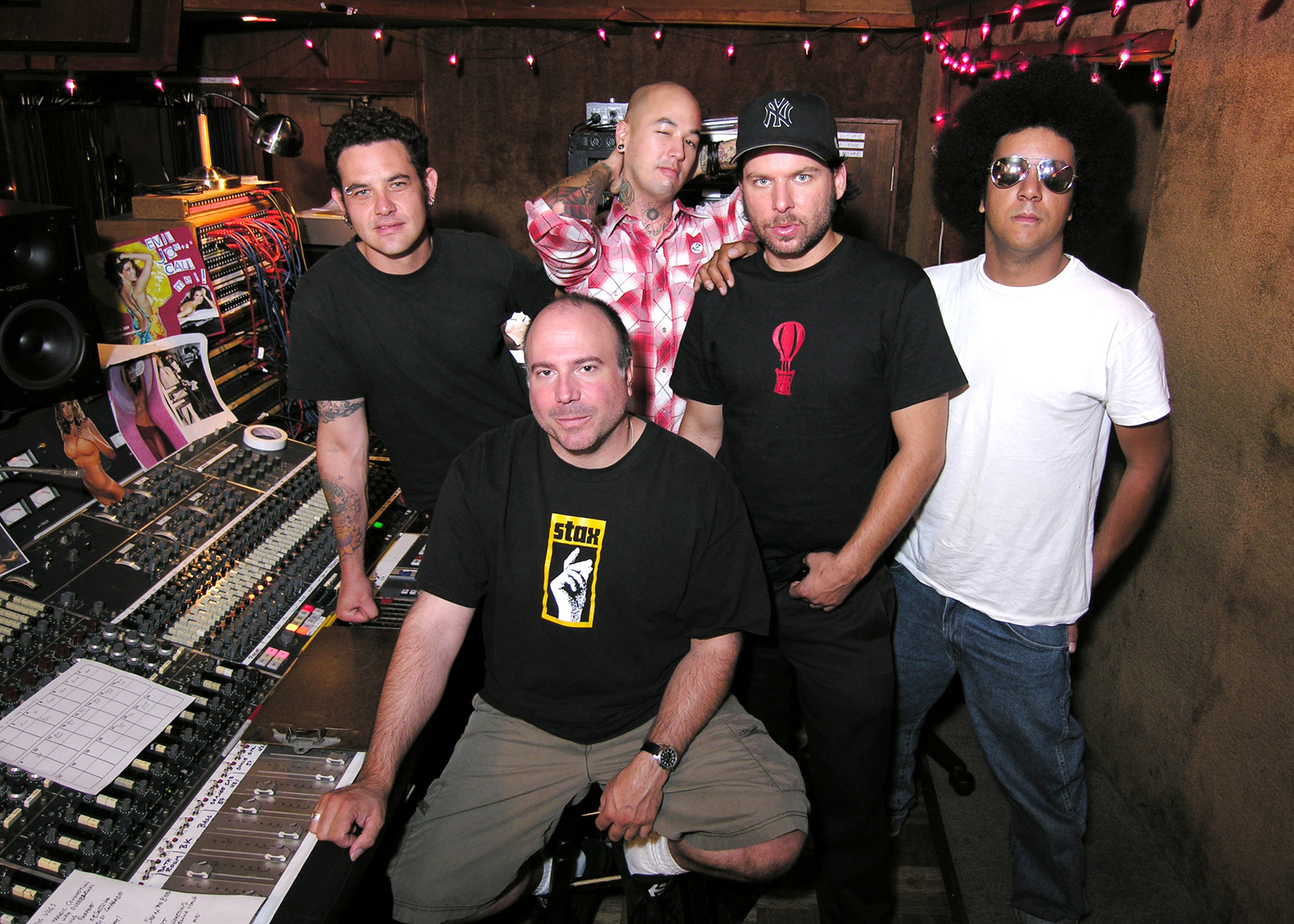
Recording with Evil Joe at Sound City

Eager to breathe new life into the band, they convinced producer Joe Barresi to record their second album after hearing rehearsal demos of their new songs. Joe fit them into his busy schedule just weeks before he began work on Tool's 10,000 Days. Days after returning from the "Resisting Arrest" tour, Joe and the band spent a few days tirelessly arranging and writing the material for 144 Hours. Less than a week later, the band was at Sound City Studios in Van Nuys, California, recording 144 Hours. The early August session was a whirlwind of concentration and creativity. The record was recorded in six days or 144 hours. Joe mixed 16 songs in six more days and the result was staggering. The band heard, in the music, all their hard work paying off. With the help of Joe, the band knew they had captured something special and sincere. This record had the urgency of The Stooges, the sad beauty of Siouxsie and the Banshees, and the organic analog sonic execution of any great heavy rock record of the 1970s. The record was recorded completely on 2-inch reel to reel analog tape. Even the mixes never touched a computer or Pro Tools. They went straight from the 2-inch to 1/2 inch analog tape. That was how Joe worked and that is precisely why they chose him in the first place. They were ecstatic about the recording and could not wait to talk to Travis Barker to discuss possible release dates.

In an effort to continue with their DIY attitude before signing with La Salle, they self-booked another nationwide tour with Seattle band, The Cops. The Nervous Return were out of money and could not afford to tour, yet they went out anyway. The tour took its toll on the band's mental and physical health as they slept on floors, barely ate, and played night after night, many times to "just a few drunks". La Salle pressed an EP from the 144 Hours sessions and 500 7" singles on white vinyl for the song "BAD GIRL" b/w "Snow In Berlin". The latter was written about experiences in Berlin when the wide-eyed band toured Europe the year before. La Salle did not release the EP or the 7" single but the band was given a few to sell on tour. The band toured America relentlessly throughout October and November, taking the rest of 2005 off to rest. Shane Gallagher joined +44, a Blink 182 side project featuring Mark Hoppus and Travis Barker, both of Blink fame.

As January came and went, Travis Barker and La Salle still did not have any plans of releasing 144 Hours. The band played a few local shows while waiting to see if their album would be released. The legalities of the contract were difficult to maneuver and with Shane now part of Travis' new band, personal feelings and relationships became stressed. The band was at a standstill having finished a recording yet without a label unable to release it. After a few months of cognitive dissonance and psychological disintegration, the Nervous Return disbanded in April 2006.

After almost 13 years, Tony, Greg and Jason reunited to play one show in Los Angeles on December 18, 2018.

=== End ===
Shane Gallagher is playing with various bands including but not limited to +44 and the Mercy Killers.

Jason is still an avid music lover and plays for pleasure in various outfits, many of them a poly-cotton blend.

Tony is still playing many different kinds of music in Los Angeles, namely Hearing Things and Amplified.

Greg is playing with the band Mad Planet in Los Angeles.

== Band members ==
- Shane Gallagher - guitar
- Anthony Crouse - bass guitar, vocals
- Jason Muller- guitar, vocals
- Greg Gordon - drums

== Discography ==
=== Albums ===
| Year | Title | Label | Other information |
|---|---|---|---|
| 2001 | twig | Psychic Noise | First album. 5 tracks, EP. The band was still going under the name "twig" at the time of this release. |
| 2002 | Headshots | Mootron | First album |
| 2003 | Headshots(Europe) | Nois-o-lution | Different track list than U.S.A. version. The Euro version adds three songs from the s/t "twig" EP and does not include "She's A Thief". |
| 2004 | Wake Up Dead | LaSalle Records | Second album. Three songs re-recorded from s/t EP. |
| 2005 | the sex, the drugs...the Nervous return | LaSalle Records | Second EP. Five tracks. Two tracks from "144 HOURS" LP (hell in a handshake, flip a bitch), 1 song also available on 7" single (bad girl), 2 songs exclusively available only on this EP (got a bleeder, dennis woodruff). |
| 2005 | "Bad Girl" b/w "Snow in Berlin" | LaSalle Records | First vinyl 7" single. White vinyl. Guest vocal by Heather Gallagher on "Bad Girl". "Snow in Berlin" only available on this 7" single. 500 pressing. |
| 2005 | 144 HOURS | Unreleased | |

=== Extras ===
| Year | Title | Label | Other information |
|---|---|---|---|
| 2003 | 3 song sampler | Mootron | Action Pill, Crotchrocket, Life of Uncertainty. Only available digitally. |
