= Mercy Killers =

American gothic rock band (2004–2008)

- Origin: Los Angeles, California, U.S.
- Genres: Gothic rock; punk rock
- Years active: 2004–2008
- Label: Hellcat
- Spinoff of: +44
- Past members: Craig Fairbaugh; Shane Gallagher; Sam Soto; Colin Barill

Mercy Killers were an American gothic rock band from Los Angeles, California. It was formed in 2004 by future members of alternative rock band +44 Craig Fairbaugh and Shane Gallagher. Other members were Sam Soto aka Sampire on bass, Colin Berrill on drums. They released their album Bloodlove on June 6, 2006. They disbanded in 2008.

== Members ==
- Craig Fairbaugh - lead guitar and vocals. Fairbaugh was the guitarist for the Supergroup, +44, and former member of several other bands including Lars Frederiksen and the Bastards, Transplants, Juliette and the Licks, and The Forgotten.
- Sam Soto aka. Sampire - bass and vocals. Co-founder of the band Original Sinners and former member of Sluts for Hire.
- Colin Berrill - drums. Former member of Irish band The Gurriers, The Flaws and The Gakk
- Shane Gallagher - guitar; was a part of +44, and of The Nervous Return.

== Discography ==
- Mercy Killers (EP) (2005)
- Bloodlove (2006)
