= No, It Isn't =

Promotional single by +44

from the album When Your Heart Stops Beating
- Released: December 13, 2005
- Recorded: 2005
- Studio: Opra Music (Los Angeles, California)
- Genre: Alternative rock
- Length: 3:03 (demo version); 3:32 (album version)
- Label: Interscope
- Songwriters: Mark Hoppus, Travis Barker
- Producers: Mark Hoppus, Travis Barker, Jerry Finn

"No, It Isn't" is a song by American rock band +44, released on December 13, 2005 as their debut track. The song was written about bassist Mark Hoppus and drummer Travis Barker's previous musical outfit, Blink-182, and the group's breakup. The track's lyrics largely concern former bandmate Tom DeLonge (Although, they never truly acknowledge this, Hence the name “No, it isn’t”) and also encompass feelings of betrayal by friends and label executives.

"No, It Isn't"—titled so to avoid press questions on the matter of whether it was about their former bandmate. It was available for digital download on the band's official website as the first single on December 13, 2005, the day DeLonge was also due to release material of his own and also, non-coincidentally, his thirtieth birthday. The demo was later released as a CD single of 500 copies, and re-recorded for the band's debut album, When Your Heart Stops Beating.

== Background ==
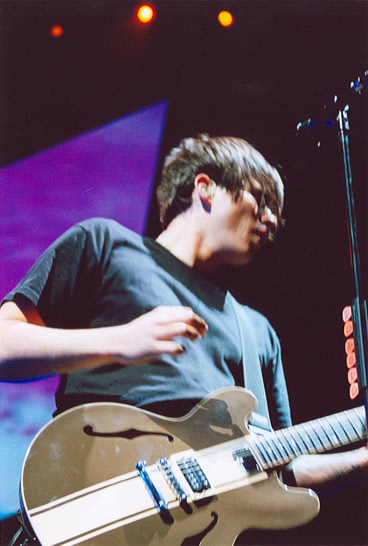
The song was largely written about former bandmate Tom DeLonge, seen here in 2004.

"No It Isn't" was directly inspired by the breakup of Hoppus and Barker's former musical outfit, Blink-182. The trio embarked on a fall 2004 European tour, during which DeLonge felt increasingly conflicted both about his creative freedom within the group and the toll touring was taking on his family life. He eventually expressed his desire to take a half-year respite from touring in order to spend more time with family. Hoppus and Barker were dismayed by his decision, which they felt was an overly long break. DeLonge did not blame his bandmates for being disappointed with his requests, but was dismayed that they seemingly could not understand. Following the 2004 Indian Ocean earthquake, DeLonge agreed to perform at Music for Relief's Concert for South Asia, a benefit show to aid victims. Further arguments ensued during rehearsals, rooted in the band members’ increasing paranoia and bitterness toward one another. He considered his bandmates’ priorities "mad, mad different," coming to the conclusion that the trio had simply grown apart as they aged, had families, and reached fame. The breakdown in communication led to heated exchanges, resulting in his exit from the group. Geffen announced on February 22, 2005 that Blink-182 would be going on an "indefinite hiatus," and label president Jordan Schur reportedly told Barker that "any press you do, make sure you say everything is cool."

"The only reason we were being cool and calling it an 'indefinite hiatus' is because that's what this dork at the head of our record label was telling us. So that's when you find out that everyone was conspiring against you," Barker recalled. Schur had announced the formation of his own imprint, Suretone Records, in March and released We Don't Need To Whisper, the debut from DeLonge's new group, Angels & Airwaves, in May. "['No It Isn't'] is about coming out a year later and telling the truth [...] obviously we weren't going to say anything bad about him while we were recording our record, but now that it's done, we are gonna talk about it," said Barker in 2006. "For a year, people were saying that what Tom did was valid or called for. It eats at you. So maybe you have to talk about it, and maybe you have to write a song about it." The song was titled "No, It Isn't" as a "pre-emptive strike against the inevitable questions as to whether it is about Tom DeLonge." Hoppus elaborated on the title in 2006: "Originally I was going to hide behind something else when people asked what the song was about. Obviously they'd ask if it was about Tom and I was going to say, 'No, it isn't; it's about a girl I used to date,' or something. But we all love the song so much and I thought, 'Why would I hide behind anything other than that's the way I feel?' So it was actually way more meaningful and liberating to say that's what the song's about."

The song, in demo form, was made available for digital download through the band's official website on December 13—the day DeLonge was also due to release material of his own and also, non-coincidentally, his thirtieth birthday. Hoppus and Barker denied this was their design. The demo was also briefly available as a limited CD release of 500 copies that came free with purchased merchandise from the band's site. The track was later re-recorded and released on the band's debut studio album, When Your Heart Stops Beating (2006). The song was originally entirely acoustic, but took on a louder, harder sound in the final version. Barker initially was reluctant to add drums to the song, feeling that Hoppus' lyrics combined well with the song's quiet, acoustic nature, but was largely "outvoted [...] They like drums in it, so I was like, "I'm down with it. If it makes the song better, I'm gonna do it."

== Format and track listing ==
Lyrics written by Mark Hoppus, music composed by +44.

CD (2005)
No.	Title	Length
1.	"No, It Isn't" (demo version)	3:03

== Personnel ==
Demo version

- Mark Hoppus – lead vocals, bass guitar
- Shane Gallagher – lead guitar
- Carol Heller – rhythm guitar, backing vocals
- Travis Barker – drums, percussion, electronics

Album version

- Mark Hoppus – lead vocals, bass guitar, additional guitar
- Shane Gallagher – lead guitar
- Travis Barker – drums, percussion,
- Craig Fairbaugh – vocals, rhythm guitar, keyboards
