= Honda Civic Tour =

Concert tour

- Genre: Rock; pop rock; hip hop; pop
- Locations: United States, Canada
- Years active: 2001–2018; 2022
- Founders: Honda
- Website: Official website

The Honda Civic Tour is an annual concert tour, sponsored by American Honda Motor Company and named after the Civic compact car.

== 2001 ==
=== First half ===
- Headliner: Blink-182
- Supporting: No Motiv, Sum 41, The Ataris, and Bodyjar

=== Second half ===
- Headliner: Everclear
- Supporting: American Hi-Fi and The Mayfield Four

== 2002 ==
- Headliner: Incubus
- Supporting: Hoobastank and Phantom Planet

== 2003 ==
- Headliner: New Found Glory and Good Charlotte
- Supporting: Eve 6, Hot Rod Circuit, Less Than Jake, MxPx, Stretch Arm Strong, The Movielife, and The Disasters

== 2004 ==
- Headliner: Dashboard Confessional
- Supporting: The Get Up Kids, Thrice, Val Emmich, The Format, Say Anything, Hot Water Music, Motion City Soundtrack and Head Automatica

== 2005 ==
- Headliner: Maroon 5
- Supporting: Phantom Planet, The Donnas and The Thrills

== 2006 ==
- Headliner: The Black Eyed Peas (Given away from the music video of "Pump It")
- Supporting: Flipsyde and The Pussycat Dolls

2006 tour dates
Date	City	Country	Venue
North America
March 23, 2006	Fresno	United States	Save Mart Center
March 24, 2006	Sacramento	United States	ARCO Arena
March 25, 2006	Reno	United States	Reno Events Center
March 26, 2006	San Diego	United States	BaySide Concerts at the Embarcadero
March 28, 2006	Los Angeles	United States	Gibson Amphitheatre
March 29, 2006	Los Angeles	United States	Gibson Amphitheatre
March 31, 2006	Phoenix	United States	Dodge Theatre
April 7, 2006	Dallas	United States	Smirnoff Music Centre
April 8, 2006	The Woodlands	United States	Cynthia Woods Mitchell Pavilion
April 9, 2006	Selma	United States	Verizon Wireless Amphitheater
April 11, 2006	Tampa	United States	USF Sun Dome
April 13, 2006	Sunrise	United States	BankAtlantic Center
April 14, 2006	Gainesville	United States	O'Connell Center
April 15, 2006	Atlanta	United States	Chastain Park Amphitheater
April 18, 2006	Cary	United States	Koka Booth Amphitheatre
April 19, 2006	Norfolk	United States	Norfolk Scope
April 21, 2006	New York City	United States	WaMu Theater
April 22, 2006	Columbia	United States	Merriweather Post Pavilion
April 23, 2006	Camden	United States	Tweeter Center
April 25, 2006	Amherst	United States	Mullins Memorial Center
April 26, 2006	Fairfield	United States	Pitt Center
April 28, 2006	Verona	United States	Turning Stone Event Center
April 29, 2006	Boston	United States	Agganis Arena
April 30, 2006	University Park	United States	Bryce Theatre
May 2, 2006	Columbus	United States	Value City Arena
May 3, 2006	Noblesville	United States	Verizon Wireless Music Center
May 4, 2006	Detroit	United States	Fox Theatre
May 6, 2006	Chicago	United States	Aragon Ballroom
May 7, 2006	Saint Paul	United States	Xcel Energy Center
May 12, 2006	Oakland	United States	Oakland Arena
May 14, 2006	Portland	United States	Theater of the Clouds
May 15, 2006	Everett	United States	Everett Events Center
May 16, 2006	Spokane	United States	Star Theatre
May 19, 2006	Nampa	United States	Idaho Center Theater
May 20, 2006	West Valley City	United States	Ford Theatre
May 21, 2006	Denver	United States	Universal Lending Pavilion

== 2007 ==
- Headliner: Fall Out Boy
- Supporting: +44, The Academy Is..., Cobra Starship, and Paul Wall

2007 tour dates
Date	City	Country	Venue
North America
May 11, 2007	Greenwood Village	United States	Fiddler's Green Amphitheatre
May 12, 2007	Bonner Springs	United States	Verizon Wireless Amphitheater
May 13, 2007	Council Bluffs	United States	Mid-America Center
May 15, 2007	Moline	United States	The MARK of the Quad Cities
May 16, 2007	Minneapolis	United States	Target Center
May 17, 2007	Milwaukee	United States	Bradley Center
May 18, 2007	Maryland Heights	United States	Verizon Wireless Amphitheater
May 20, 2007	Cuyahoga Falls	United States	Blossom Music Center
May 21, 2007	Cincinnati	United States	Riverbend Music Center
May 22, 2007	Burgettstown	United States	Post-Gazette Pavilion
May 23, 2007	Virginia Beach	United States	Verizon Wireless Amphitheatre
May 25, 2007	Montreal	Canada	Bell Centre
May 26, 2007	Toronto	Canada	Molson Amphitheatre
May 27, 2007	Clarkston	United States	DTE Energy Music Theatre
May 28, 2007	Darien	United States	Darien Lake Performing Arts Center
May 30, 2007	Saratoga Springs	United States	Saratoga Performing Arts Center
May 31, 2007	Mansfield	United States	Tweeter Center for the Performing Arts
June 1, 2007	Camden	United States	Tweeter Center
June 2, 2007	Hartford	United States	New England Dodge Music Center
June 4, 2007	Columbia	United States	Merriweather Post Pavilion
June 5, 2007	Wantagh	United States	Nikon at Jones Beach Theater
June 6, 2007	Holmdel Township	United States	PNC Bank Arts Center
June 9, 2007	Chicago	United States	Charter One Pavilion
June 10, 2007	Chicago	United States	Charter One Pavilion
June 11, 2007	Chicago	United States	Charter One Pavilion
June 12, 2007	Noblesville	United States	Verizon Wireless Music Center
June 13, 2007	Charlotte	United States	Verizon Wireless Amphitheatre
June 14, 2007	Atlanta	United States	HiFi Buys Amphitheatre
June 15, 2007	Tampa	United States	Ford Amphitheatre
June 16, 2007	West Palm Beach	United States	Sound Advice Amphitheatre
June 18, 2007	The Woodlands	United States	Cynthia Woods Mitchell Pavilion
June 19, 2007	Dallas	United States	Smirnoff Music Centre
June 20, 2007	Selma	United States	Verizon Wireless Amphitheater
June 22, 2007	Phoenix	United States	Cricket Wireless Pavilion
June 23, 2007	Inglewood	United States	The Forum
June 24, 2007	Las Vegas	United States	Palms Casino Resort
June 25, 2007	West Valley City	United States	E Center
June 27, 2007	Tacoma	United States	Tacoma Dome
June 28, 2007	Vancouver	Canada	Pacific Coliseum
June 29, 2007	Portland	United States	Rose Garden
June 30, 2007	Concord	United States	Sleep Train Pavilion
July 1, 2007	Chula Vista	United States	Coors Amphitheatre
July 2, 2007	Anaheim	United States	Honda Center

== 2008 ==
- Headliner: Panic! at the Disco
- Supporting: The Hush Sound, Motion City Soundtrack, Death Cab For Cutie, and Phantom Planet

2008 tour dates
Date	City	Country	Venue
North America
April 10, 2008	San Francisco	United States	Warfield Theatre
April 11, 2008	San Francisco	United States	Warfield Theatre
April 12, 2008	San Diego	United States	Soma San Diego
April 13, 2008	Mesa	United States	Mesa Amphitheatre
April 15, 2008	Tulsa	United States	Brady Theater
April 17, 2008	Ruston	United States	Thomas Assembly Center
April 18, 2008	Dallas	United States	Palladium Ballroom
April 19, 2008	Austin	United States	Waller Creek Amphitheatre
April 20, 2008	Houston	United States	Verizon Wireless Theater
April 22, 2008	Clearwater	United States	Ruth Eckerd Hall
April 23, 2008	Miami Beach	United States	The Fillmore Miami Beach
April 24, 2008	Orlando	United States	House of Blues
April 26, 2008	Atlanta	United States	Masquerade Music Park
April 27, 2008	Charlotte	United States	Amos' Southend
April 29, 2008	Myrtle Beach	United States	House of Blues
April 30, 2008	Washington, D.C.	United States	DAR Constitution Hall
May 2, 2008	Orono	United States	Alfond Arena
May 3, 2008	Troy	United States	RPI Fieldhouse
May 6, 2008	Rochester	United States	Gordon Field House
May 7, 2008	New York City	United States	Roseland Ballroom
May 8, 2008	New York City	United States	Roseland Ballroom
May 9, 2008	Philadelphia	United States	Festival Pier
May 10, 2008	Wallingford	United States	Chevrolet Theatre
May 11, 2008	Boston	United States	Bank of America Pavilion
May 13, 2008	Montreal	Canada	Métropolis
May 14, 2008	Toronto	Canada	Sound Academy
May 16, 2008	Cleveland	United States	Tower City Amphitheatre
May 17, 2008	Columbus	United States	Promowest Pavilion
May 18, 2008	Indianapolis	United States	Egyptian Room
May 20, 2008	Detroit	United States	The Fillmore Detroit
May 23, 2008	Chicago	United States	Congress Theater
May 24, 2008	Chicago	United States	Congress Theater
May 25, 2008	Milwaukee	United States	Eagles Ballroom
May 27, 2008	Minneapolis	United States	Myth Concert Nightclub
May 30, 2008	St. Louis	United States	Pageant Concert Nightclub
May 31, 2008	Council Bluffs	United States	Westfair Amphitheater
June 1, 2008	Kansas City	United States	Uptown Theater
June 3, 2008	Denver	United States	Fillmore Auditorium
June 4, 2008	Salt Lake City	United States	Saltair
June 6, 2008	Vancouver	Canada	PNE Forum
June 7, 2008	Seattle	United States	Paramount Theatre
June 8, 2008	Portland	United States	Portland Metropolitan Exposition Center
June 10, 2008	Reno	United States	Grand Theatre
June 13, 2008	Las Vegas	United States	Pearl Concert Theater
June 14, 2008	Anaheim	United States	The Theatre at Honda Center

== 2009 ==
Originally planned for All-American Rejects and Jack's Mannequin to co-headline the tour, but it was cancelled possibly due to concerts by No Doubt and Blink-182 taking place around the same time.

== 2010 ==
- Headliner: Paramore
- Supporting: Tegan and Sara (except on the show of July 28 at the Comcast Center and the show of July 30 in Norfolk Virginia, where Relient K performed), New Found Glory, Kadawatha

2010 tour dates
Date	City	Country	Venue
North America
July 23, 2010	Raleigh	United States	Raleigh Amphitheater
July 24, 2010	Harrington	United States	Delaware State Fair
July 27, 2010	Wallingford	United States	Chevrolet Theatre
July 28, 2010	Mansfield	United States	Comcast Center
July 30, 2010	Norfolk	United States	Constant Convocation Center
July 31, 2010	Columbia	United States	Merriweather Post Pavilion
August 3, 2010	Gilford	United States	Meadowbrook U.S. Cellular Pavilion
August 4, 2010	Philadelphia	United States	Festival Pier
August 7, 2010	Hershey	United States	Star Pavilion
August 8, 2010	Darien	United States	Darien Lake Performing Arts Center
August 10, 2010	Cleveland	United States	Tower City Amphitheatre
August 12, 2010	Cincinnati	United States	PNC Pavilion
August 14, 2010	Milwaukee	United States	Marcus Amphitheater
August 15, 2010	Rochester Hills	United States	Meadow Brook
August 18, 2010	Chicago	United States	Charter One Pavilion
August 19, 2010	Indianapolis	United States	The Lawn at White River State Park
August 21, 2010	Nashville	United States	Nashville Municipal Auditorium
September 1, 2010	Duluth	United States	Arena at Gwinnett Center
September 2, 2010	St. Augustine	United States	St. Augustine Amphitheatre
September 4, 2010	Miami	United States	Bayfront Park Amphitheater
September 5, 2010	Orlando	United States	UCF Arena
September 7, 2010	New Orleans	United States	UNO Lakefront Arena
September 8, 2010	The Woodlands	United States	Cynthia Woods Mitchell Pavilion
September 10, 2010	Grand Prairie	United States	Verizon Theatre at Grand Prairie
September 13, 2010	Morrison	United States	Red Rocks Amphitheatre
September 15, 2010	Phoenix	United States	Dodge Theatre
September 17, 2010	San Jose	United States	HP Pavilion at San Jose
September 18, 2010	San Diego	United States	Viejas Arena
September 19, 2010	Anaheim	United States	Honda Center

== 2011 ==
- Headliner: Blink-182 and My Chemical Romance
- Supporting: Rancid, Manchester Orchestra, Against Me!, Matt and Kim, Alkaline Trio (Performed 8/7), Neon Trees (Performed 9/8)

== 2012 ==
- Headliner: Linkin Park & Incubus
- Supporting: Mutemath

== 2013 ==
- Headliner: Maroon 5 & Kelly Clarkson
- Supporting: Rozzi Crane, Tony Lucca, PJ Morton

== 2014 ==
- Headliner: Grouplove & Portugal. The Man, American Authors, 3BallMTY
- Supporting: Typhoon, Tokyo Police Club, Echosmith

== 2015 ==
- Headliner: One Direction
- Supporting: Icona Pop

== 2016 ==
- Headliner: Demi Lovato & Nick Jonas
- Supporting: Mike Posner, Chord Overstreet

== 2017 ==
- Headliner: OneRepublic
- Supporting: Fitz and the Tantrums, James Arthur

== 2018 ==
- Headliner: Charlie Puth
- Supporting: Hailee Steinfeld

== 2020 ==
- Headliner: Niall Horan
- Supporting: Lewis Capaldi, FLETCHER, and Sam Fischer

== 2022 ==
- Headliner: The Future X

2022 tour dates
Date	City	Country	Venue
North America
July 27, 2022	West Hollywood	United States	The Roxy
August 1, 2022	Washington, D.C.	United States	Union Stage
August 7, 2022	New York City	United States	Bowery Ballroom
August 11, 2022	Chicago	United States	Lincoln Hall
August 16, 2022	Miami	United States	1-800-LUCKY
August 21, 2022	Phoenix	United States	Crescent Ballroom
October 8, 2022	Austin	United States	Honda Stage at AUSTIN CITY LIMITS
