= Simple Creatures =

American pop rock band (2019–2020)

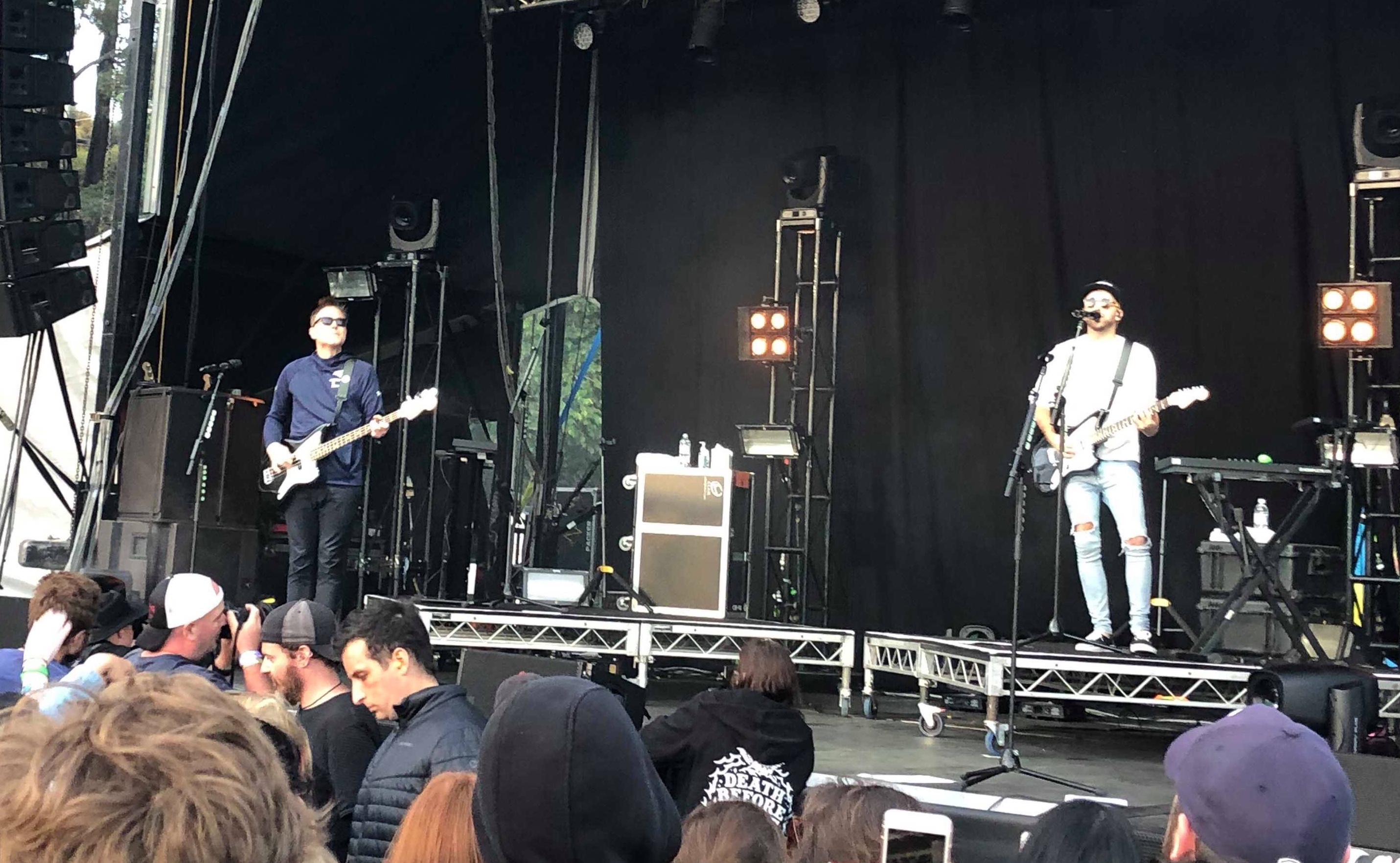
- Simple Creatures live at Good Things Festival (Melbourne, 2019)

Background information
- Origin: Los Angeles, California, U.S.
- Genres: Pop rock; synth-pop; electronic rock; pop; alternative rock
- Years active: 2019–2020 (Note: Simple Creatures has been inactive since 2020.)
- Label: BMG
- Spinoff of: Blink-182; All Time Low
- Past members: Alex Gaskarth; Mark Hoppus
- Website: simplecreaturesmusic.com

Simple Creatures was an American pop rock duo that was formed by vocalist, bassist, and keyboardist Mark Hoppus of Blink-182 and vocalist, guitarist, and keyboardist Alex Gaskarth of All Time Low. Based in Los Angeles, the duo released their first EP, Strange Love, on March 29, 2019. Their second EP, Everything Opposite, was released on October 11, 2019.

== Biography ==
=== 2019: Strange Love and Everything Opposite ===
Alex Gaskarth grew up a fan of Blink-182, and his group, All Time Low, eventually toured with the band on its 2016 California Tour. Mark Hoppus, the band's bassist, had become friends with Gaskarth over the years and the two had always spoken about collaborating at some point. Following completion of the California tour dates in 2017, Hoppus fell into a depression, and re-entered the studio hoping to record with artists he had always wanted to work with. He called Gaskarth first, and the two ended up writing several songs in the first sessions together. The project, Simple Creatures, was announced in January 2019, with the lead single "Drug". The duo's first extended play, Strange Love, was released March 29 via BMG. The duo also announced a four date tour of the US and UK during March and April 2019, alongside two music festivals in Europe during Summer 2019.

In April 2019, shortly after the release of their Strange Love EP, the band confirmed in an interview that they have a second EP and a debut album ready to release in the near future. On June 12, 2019, the band released "Special". Later that day, Gaskarth confirmed that it will be off an upcoming EP. The band later released a video for "Special", and announced their second EP, Everything Opposite, which was released on October 11, 2019.

=== 2020: Scrapped album and hiatus ===
Despite teasing an album release for 2020, no album came to fruition. Simple Creatures' official social media pages have been inactive since 2020 and no new material has been released since Everything Opposite, though in 2021 Gaskarth stated that there was a possibility of new music in the future. In 2025, when asked by Rolling Stone Australia if there is a future for the project, Gaskarth said:

We always said that that while we both love the project and we love working with each other, we agreed from the jump that Simple Creatures wasn’t going to replace either of our day jobs. It would be something that we would thread in when the time was right. There was a window where we were considering going back and doing more, and then obviously Mark got sick and went through what he went through and that, kind of, led to the timing of Blink coming back together and reuniting. That was meant to be ... [But] it’s still something that’s on the table, you know what I mean? Mark and I keep in touch. At this point, it feels like it’s a joke because we've both been so busy, so we joke about getting the band back together often ... But realistically, I have no fucking idea when we might do it.

== Musical style and influences ==
Simple Creatures' musical style has been described as pop, pop rock, synth-pop, electronic rock, and alternative rock. Hoppus and Gaskarth have described Simple Creatures' sound as "trash pop", which Hoppus has defined as "ratty guitars, big bombastic drum loops, [and] buzzy synths."

Both Hoppus and Gaskarth credited The Cure and its frontman, Robert Smith, as an influence on their first EP, Strange Love. "There were many, many times during the recording process that we referenced The Cure sounds, or the way that Robert Smith writes," Hoppus told Kerrang!. The music of the duo contains programmed drums, guitars, and synthesizers. Hoppus credited his longtime influences the Descendents and Bad Religion as an influence, stating that he and Gaskarth both come from a "catchy punk rock background." Lyrically, the duo hoped to imbue darker qualities and edginess into pop songs. "We’re both deeply sad people on the inside. That dark pop, goth, emo thing," Gaskarth said.

== Band members ==
- Alex Gaskarth – vocals, guitars, keyboards, production, engineering
- Mark Hoppus – vocals, bass, keyboards, guitars, production, engineering

== Discography ==
Extended plays

- Strange Love (2019)
- Everything Opposite (2019)
