= +44 (band) =

American rock band (2005–2009)

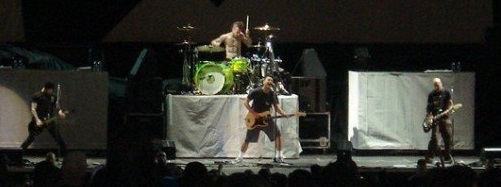
- +44 performing in 2006. From left to right: Craig Fairbaugh, Travis Barker, Mark Hoppus, and Shane Gallagher.

Background information
- Also known as: Plus 44
- Origin: Los Angeles, California, U.S.
- Genres: Pop-punk; emo pop; alternative rock
- Works: +44 discography
- Years active: 2005–2009
- Label: Interscope
- Past members: Mark Hoppus; Travis Barker; Carol Heller; Shane Gallagher; Craig Fairbaugh

+44 (Note: read as Plus Forty-four) was an American rock supergroup formed in Los Angeles, California, in 2005. The group consisted of vocalist and bassist Mark Hoppus and drummer Travis Barker of Blink-182, lead guitarist Shane Gallagher of the Nervous Return, and rhythm guitarist Craig Fairbaugh of Mercy Killers. Hoppus and Barker created +44 shortly after the initial 2005 breakup of Blink-182 and before it was later reformed. It was partly in retaliation to Tom Delonge who started Box Car Racer with Barker but without Hoppus. The band's name refers to the international dialing code of the United Kingdom, the country where the duo first discussed the project. Early recordings were largely electronic in nature, and featured vocals by Carol Heller, formerly of the all-girl punk quartet Get the Girl.

The band's sound gradually took on a heavier tone as Hoppus and Barker purchased a studio in which to record. Although anticipated by the music press, the band's only album When Your Heart Stops Beating, released on November 13, 2006, underperformed commercial expectations and received mixed reviews from critics. The group toured worldwide throughout 2006 and 2007, including a summer slot on the Honda Civic Tour alongside Fall Out Boy. Hoppus later began preparing material for a second +44 album, but the group went inactive with the reunion of Blink-182 in 2009. A reunion is possible yet very unlikely.

== History ==
=== Blink-182 problems and hiatus ===
By 2004, Blink-182—consisting of bassist Mark Hoppus, guitarist Tom DeLonge, and drummer Travis Barker—had emerged as the biggest pop punk act of the era, releasing the multiplatinum albums Enema of the State (1999) and Take Off Your Pants and Jacket (2001), with the latter reaching number one. The band took a brief break in 2002 when DeLonge suffered a herniated disc in his back. During this time, he collected several darker musical ideas he felt unsuitable for Blink-182, compiling them in the album Box Car Racer. This latter was recorded with the help of Hazen Street guitarist and longtime friend David Kennedy, and was intended as a one-time experimental project, but evolved into a full-fledged band, with Barker behind the kit. This side project would cause great division between DeLonge and Hoppus, who was not included and felt betrayed. The moody subject matter and music on Box Car Racer edged its way into the Blink sound as well, and the band explored experimental elements on their fifth album, the untitled album (2003).

The trio embarked on a European tour the following fall, during which DeLonge felt increasingly conflicted both about his creative freedom within the group and the toll touring was taking on his family life. He eventually expressed his desire to take a half-year respite from touring, in order to spend more time with his family. Hoppus and Barker were dismayed by his decision, which they felt was an overly long break. DeLonge did not blame his band-mates for being disappointed with his requests, but was himself dismayed that they could not seemingly understand. In addition, DeLonge protested the idea of Barker's reality television series Meet the Barkers, which was being produced for a 2005 premiere. He disliked television cameras everywhere, feeling his personal privacy invaded.

Following the 2004 Indian Ocean earthquake and tsunami, DeLonge agreed to perform at Music for Relief's Concert for South Asia, a benefit show to aid victims. Further arguments ensued during rehearsals, rooted in the band member's increasing paranoia and bitterness toward one another. He considered his band-mates' priorities very different, coming to the conclusion that the trio had simply grown apart as they aged, had families, and achieved fame. The breakdown in communication led to heated exchanges, resulting in his exit from the group. It was announced on February 22, 2005, that Blink-182 would be going on an "indefinite hiatus". DeLonge would not speak to Barker or Hoppus—whom he once considered his greatest friends—for several years. Despite this, Geffen Records president Jordan Schur reportedly told Barker that "any press you do, make sure you say everything is cool".

=== +44 formation (2005) ===
Hoppus and Barker began laying down new ideas. Recording in Barker's basement and Hoppus' dining room, by necessity everything was electronic, with the two musicians experimenting with electronic drums, samples, keyboards and direct computer recordings. While away on a trip in April 2005, Hoppus participated in an interview with MTV News in which he revealed the band's existence. When the two regrouped, they decided to stop giving interviews about the new project. The band's name is a reference to the country code needed when placing a phone call to the United Kingdom, where Hoppus and Barker first discussed making music alone. The basement recordings were ambient and quiet by necessity.

=== When Your Heart Stops Beating (2006–07) ===
The addition of other members to +44 came gradually. In April 2005, Barker invited his friend Carol Heller to provide vocals on a track. Formerly of the all-girl punk quartet Get the Girl, Heller traded and shared vocals with Hoppus on most of the band's early demos. Meanwhile, Hoppus invited friend Shane Gallagher to play the guitar on a few tracks the band began working on, and he was soon drafted as a member. Production of the record moved along swiftly once the duo purchased their own North Hollywood studio, which they dubbed Opera Music. The space—which featured two recording rooms, a lounge, and a small outdoor courtyard—was purchased in October 2005 from former Poison guitarist Richie Kotzen. After moving all band gear into the new recording center, the entire direction of the band evolved into a more organic sound. Heller became uneasy with the new direction and, with a desire to start a family, parted ways with the band by the end of the year. Shortly afterward, friend Craig Fairbaugh came in to observe, listen, and to play songs; by the end of the day, Hoppus and Barker asked him to become the fourth member of the group, which he did. The band's debut album, When Your Heart Stops Beating, was produced by Hoppus and Barker, with longtime associate and friend Jerry Finn in the role of executive producer.

The release date for When Your Heart Stops Beating was anticipated and publicized by the music press. As early as August 2005, Internet rumors began to circulate that the album would be released in January 2006, although the band's management denied the claims. Thanks to Hoppus' and Barker's silence on press interviews, misinformation flooded the Internet in the months prior to the record's release, and countless impostors posted fake songs online. "No, It Isn't" was leaked in December 2005 and caused speculation, as it addressed the break-up of Blink-182 head-on. Hoppus did not give any formal interviews prior to the release of the album, instead working on it in relative secrecy, spending time updating his blog, and producing tracks for Motion City Soundtrack. "During that time, their former bandmate, Tom DeLonge, did the opposite, peppering blogs and magazines with quotes hyping his new band and putting the blame for the Blink situation squarely on their shoulders", reported James Montgomery, of MTV News. Even though it pained them to do so, Hoppus and Barker refrained from speaking to the media, instead burying themselves in the studio for the recording of the album.

When Your Heart Stops Beating was officially released November 13, 2006. In the United States, the album debuted at number 10 on the Billboard 200, with approximately 66,000 copies sold in its first week. The album received generally mixed reviews from music critics. The New York Times described it as "zippier and catchier" than Angels & Airwaves' debut studio album We Don't Need to Whisper, but concluded that neither band was as good as Blink-182. As of September 2011, the album sold over 274,000 copies in the US. +44's first show took place at the Roxy Theatre in Hollywood, on September 7, 2006, with a second appearance following at the London Astoria. The band embarked on a promotional tour in the United Kingdom shortly thereafter. Barker was in constant pain but soldiered through the performances, altering his kit set-up to accommodate. A doctor informed Barker he had broken a bone in his arm during the band's video shoot, and was instructed to immediately rest and not take part in the band's upcoming live dates, including early 2007 jaunts to Australia and Europe. Barker nevertheless took part, but after an excruciating Amsterdam gig, the band drafted Gil Sharone, then of The Dillinger Escape Plan, to fill-in for him.

The tour rolled on to Australia and Japan, where the band busied itself with press junkets and appearances. Crowds were, according to journalist Joe Shooman, mainly Blink-182 fans. Hoppus relished the opportunity to return to smaller, more intimate club dates, rather than the massive arenas of latter-day Blink. The band spent April to June 2007 on the Honda Civic Tour of the US and Canada alongside Fall Out Boy, The Academy Is... and Paul Wall. The band began slipping old Blink songs—"What's My Age Again?" and "The Rock Show"—into set lists, despite the band's rather adamant stance against doing so months before, apparently due to Hoppus and Barker fond feelings with Blink-182.

=== Cancelled second studio album and hiatus (2008–09) ===
Further August 2007 dates were postponed. Hoppus stated the band had decided to re-enter the studio in preparation of a second studio album. Hoppus and Barker spent the remainder of the year in discussions with record companies before announcing that the planned next +44 album would see its release via Interscope Records. According to journalist Joe Shooman, little work commenced on the album. Barker started releasing hip-hop remixes on May 9, 2008, and he hoped to collate his growing collection of remixes with a bunch of new tracks on which he was working. Eventually, the project became a solo album, with Barker producing it all himself. By the following August, Hoppus began recording material for a possible solo studio album at Opera while Barker worked on his solo too, although the duo continued to work together.

In September 2008, Barker and collaborator Adam Goldstein (DJ AM) were involved in a plane crash that killed four people, leaving the two the only survivors. Barker sustained second and third degree burns and developed post-traumatic stress disorder, and the accident resulted in sixteen surgeries and 48-hour blood transfusions. DeLonge visited Barker in the hospital, and an October 2008 visit at Opera Music laid the grounds for what was to be Blink's reunion.

After Blink-182 reunited in February 2009, Hoppus told Alternative Press that +44 was on hiatus, although in an interview with Blunt Magazine in March 2009, he indicated that it would continue.

In 2019, during an interview with Hoppus' side-project Simple Creatures, Wall of Sound asked him if he would ever consider reuniting +44 to play shows again, to which he replied:

Maybe, I would never say never but I haven't talked with Craig (Fairbaugh) or Shane (Gallagher) in years and I think that they have moved on in their lives and we're in a different place. But that album holds such a special place in my life and in my memory and the lyrics and the making of that album was a huge moment of me working through the death of blink-182 at the time, and that holds a really special place in my heart so I would love to play it again at some point.

In 2024, Blink-182 performed the first verse and chorus of "When Your Heart Stops Beating" during the One More Time tour.

== Musical style and influences ==
+44's original electronic influence is an undercurrent throughout the band's music, although electronic has been overtaken by guitar. Many tracks display a traditional punk sound (with a much more melodic touch), but also highlight electronica as a key influence. Many critics noticed the similarity between the sound of the music of +44 and Blink-182's final album before their break-up, Blink-182 (2003). Its similarity is featured by the soft verse and loud chorus explosion as heard on their single "Stay Together for the Kids".

The band's sole studio album, When Your Heart Stops Beating, was largely inspired by other bands such as The Postal Service, Missing Persons, and The Cure. The album has been described stylistically as pop-punk, emo pop, and alternative rock. Screen Rant described the band's sound as "a wave of nostalgic pop-punk that perfectly captures the sound of its era."

== Band members ==
=== Final line-up ===
- Mark Hoppus – lead vocals, bass (2005–2009)
- Travis Barker – drums, percussion, keyboards (2005–2009)
- Shane Gallagher – lead guitar (2005–2009)
- Craig Fairbaugh – rhythm guitar, keyboards, vocals (2005–2009)

=== Former members ===
- Carol Heller – rhythm guitar, vocals (2005)

=== Touring musicians ===
- Gil Sharone – drums, percussion (2006–2007)

== Discography ==
Studio albums

- When Your Heart Stops Beating (2006)
