= Shane Gallagher =

American guitarist

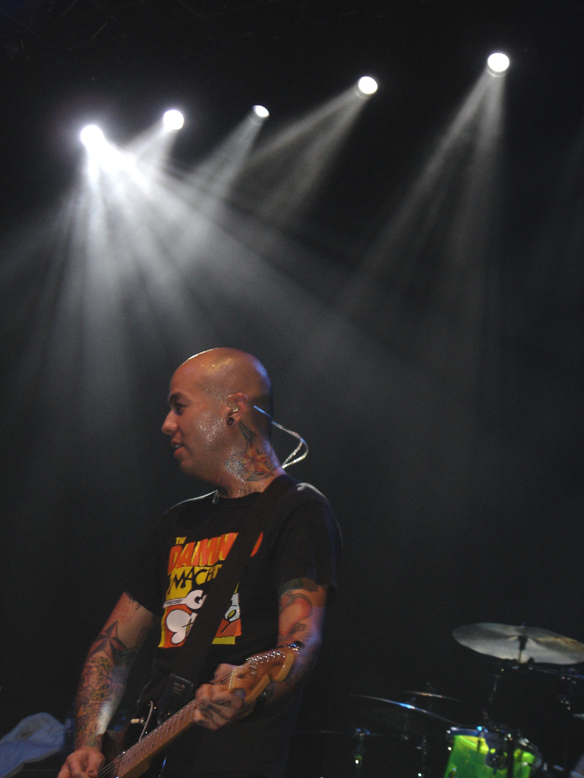
- Shane Gallagher, circa 2007

Background information
- Born: December 30, 1973 (age 52); Jakarta, Indonesia
- Origin: Rialto, California, U.S.
- Genres: Pop punk; alternative rock; power pop
- Occupation: Musician
- Instrument: Guitar
- Years active: 2004–2011
- Labels: Interscope; LaSalle
- Formerly of: The Nervous Return; Scrimmage Heroes; +44

Shane Gallagher (born December 30, 1973) is a musician who played guitar for the bands +44, Mercy Killers and The Nervous Return.

== Background ==
In 2005, Gallagher left The Nervous Return to join Mark Hoppus and Travis Barker (both of Blink-182 fame) and guitarist Craig Fairbaugh to form +44. He was brought in as a replacement for Carol Heller as guitarist in +44 after she left the band to start a family. In 2007, he officially became a member of The Mercy Killers and he went on tour with them. Once +44 went on hiatus so Mark and Travis could focus on Blink-182, Gallagher worked on several different musical projects—including the Noise Chapter, which consisted of ex-members of one of his previous bands, called the Scrimmage Heroes—as well as the instrumental, acoustic act A Death To Stars. Gallagher hasn't appeared to be active in the music industry since then.
