= Mark Hoppus =

American musician and songwriter (born 1972)

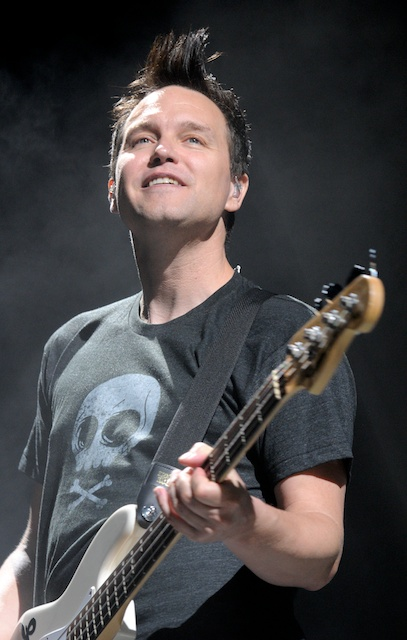
- Hoppus performing in 2011
- Born: Mark Allan Hoppus (Note: Some sources give Hoppus's birth name as "Markus Allen Hoppus", though he asserts that it is incorrect.); March 15, 1972 (age 54); Ridgecrest, California, U.S.
- Occupations: Musician; record producer; songwriter
- Spouse: Skye Everly (m. 2000)
- Children: 1
- Musical career
- Genres: Pop-punk; alternative rock; skate punk; electronic rock; pop rock; synth-pop
- Instruments: Vocals; bass guitar
- Works: Production discography
- Years active: 1988–present
- Member of: Blink-182
- Formerly of: +44; Simple Creatures
- Website: himynameismark.com

Mark Allan Hoppus (born March 15, 1972) is an American musician, songwriter and record producer. He is the co-lead vocalist, co-founder, and bassist for the rock band Blink-182 and the only constant member.

Hoppus became interested in skateboarding and punk rock in junior high, and received a bass guitar from his father at the age of 15. After he moved to San Diego in 1992 to attend California State University San Marcos, his sister introduced him to Tom DeLonge, and they formed the band Blink-182 with drummer Scott Raynor. The band produced several rock recordings and toured exhaustively before signing to major label MCA to co-distribute their sophomore effort, 1997's Dude Ranch, which featured the Hoppus-penned hit "Dammit".

After replacing Raynor with Travis Barker, Blink-182 recorded Enema of the State (1999), which launched them to multi-platinum success. Two more records followed—the heavier Take Off Your Pants and Jacket (2001) and the more experimental untitled fifth album (2003)—before the band split in 2005 following internal tension. Hoppus continued playing with Barker in +44 in the late 2000s. Blink-182 subsequently reunited in 2009 and continue to record and tour worldwide.

Aside from his musical career, Hoppus has had multiple successes behind the recording console, producing records for groups such as Idiot Pilot, New Found Glory, The Matches, Motion City Soundtrack, and PAWS. He has previously co-owned two companies, Atticus and Macbeth Footwear, and created a new clothing line in 2012 named Hi My Name is Mark. Hoppus hosted a weekly podcast in 2005 through 2006, which returned in 2015, and he hosted his own television talk show, Hoppus on Music, from 2010 to 2012 on Fuse. He also was part of the pop rock duo Simple Creatures from 2019 until 2020.

== Early life ==
Mark Allan Hoppus was born on March 15, 1972, in Ridgecrest, California. He was raised near Washington, D.C., before his family settled in Ridgecrest, a place he later described as "geniuses, scientists, physicists, and then just complete strung-out meth-heads". His maternal great-grandparents, Aaron and Lempi Orrenmaa, were Finnish immigrants from Laihia. His father Tex, like many in Ridgecrest, worked for the U.S. Department of Defense, designing missiles and bombs for the town's Navy testing center.

Hoppus describes himself as "pretty mellow" until his parents divorced when he was eight, which had a "drastic, unsettling effect" on him. He said, "When my parents argued, it was always behind closed doors. I remember sitting outside my parents' room when I was seven years old, hearing the dulled voice of anger behind the door. It upset me a lot." Following these events, he spent two years shuffling between his parents' homes with sister Anne, until he and his father moved to Monterey. His father was often away earning a postgraduate degree in college. He later would describe his childhood as lonely, remarking, "[I] was living by myself in the fifth grade." His father introduced him to the music of the Beatles, Elton John and Billy Joel.

Hoppus describes himself as "pretty straight" until junior high, when he began skateboarding and listening to punk rock. In his early high school years, he lived in Fairfax, Virginia, attending nearby Annandale High School during his second year; he received his first bass guitar during this time and attended his first concert, They Might Be Giants, at the 9:30 Club shortly before his 16th birthday. He recalled, "I didn't know where I should stand or what I should do, so my friends and I bought some menthol cigarettes and smoked for the first time and tried to look as cool as we could. We probably looked like idiots." He received his first bass (a Mako) as a gift from his father, purchased at a local music shop in Annandale. He earned money for a set of amplifiers by helping him paint his house. Hoppus never took bass lessons, instead teaching himself by playing to bands such as the Descendents, the Cure, and Bad Religion. He has remarked that "Silly Girl" by the Descendents was the "song that made [him] fall in love with punk rock music [...] that song changed [his] life forever". He borrowed a cassette tape of the Cure's album Kiss Me, Kiss Me, Kiss Me from his friend Wendy Franklin the summer following junior high school, and was taken with the song "Just Like Heaven".

I was a straight A student my whole life and then I started wearing eyeliner to school, skipping classes, and smoking cigarettes ... I was a mess, just a really glorious mess.

— Hoppus on his adolescence

Hoppus began to dress like Cure frontman Robert Smith, donning eyeliner and "occasionally bright red lipstick" to his high school classes; he later quipped, "This all went over exceedingly well with the faculty and staff in the small desert town where I grew up." Beginning in his first year, he gained solace through music of both the Cure and the Smiths. He played by himself and sang in the band Pier 69, primarily covering songs by the Cure, and recorded a live demo with a group named The Attic Children in 1988, featuring covers of the Cure songs. Hoppus returned to Ridgecrest in 1989, completing high school at Burroughs High School. In his teen years, a friend stole his mother's car in the middle of the night to pick him up; the two would sneak out to the desert and burn trees and any objects they could find.

After graduating from Burroughs High School in 1990, he began playing in a band called of All Things he formed with two friends, covering songs by Descendents, Social Distortion, and Bad Religion, as well as writing original punk numbers. The group primarily performed at friend's parties and bonfires, and once played Oasis, the local music venue. Hoppus left Ridgecrest in summer 1992 to attend college and get a job at a local music store in San Diego. He continued playing gigs with of All Things, returning on weekends. Eventually, his manager became suspicious of his weekend activities, as Hoppus had told him he worked with mentally disabled children in Ridgecrest, and refused to give him any time off on weekends. His "short-lived attempt" at college, studying at California State University, San Marcos, revolved around plans to become an English teacher. He recalls he "hated" college and his reasoning behind becoming a teacher involved sights set for educational reform. He dropped out in the early 1990s after "things began to take off with Blink-182" and lived with his mother for many of the early years of the band. Hoppus describes his mother as always supportive in his decisions to drop out of college and tour with Blink-182; however, he describes his father as "more realistic, [...] he said, 'Have something to fall back on.'" "I'm really fortunate that my mom always completely supported me, even to the point that I dropped out of college and lived at her house for five years before our band started to catch on," said Hoppus.

== Music career ==
=== Blink-182 ===
==== Early career ====
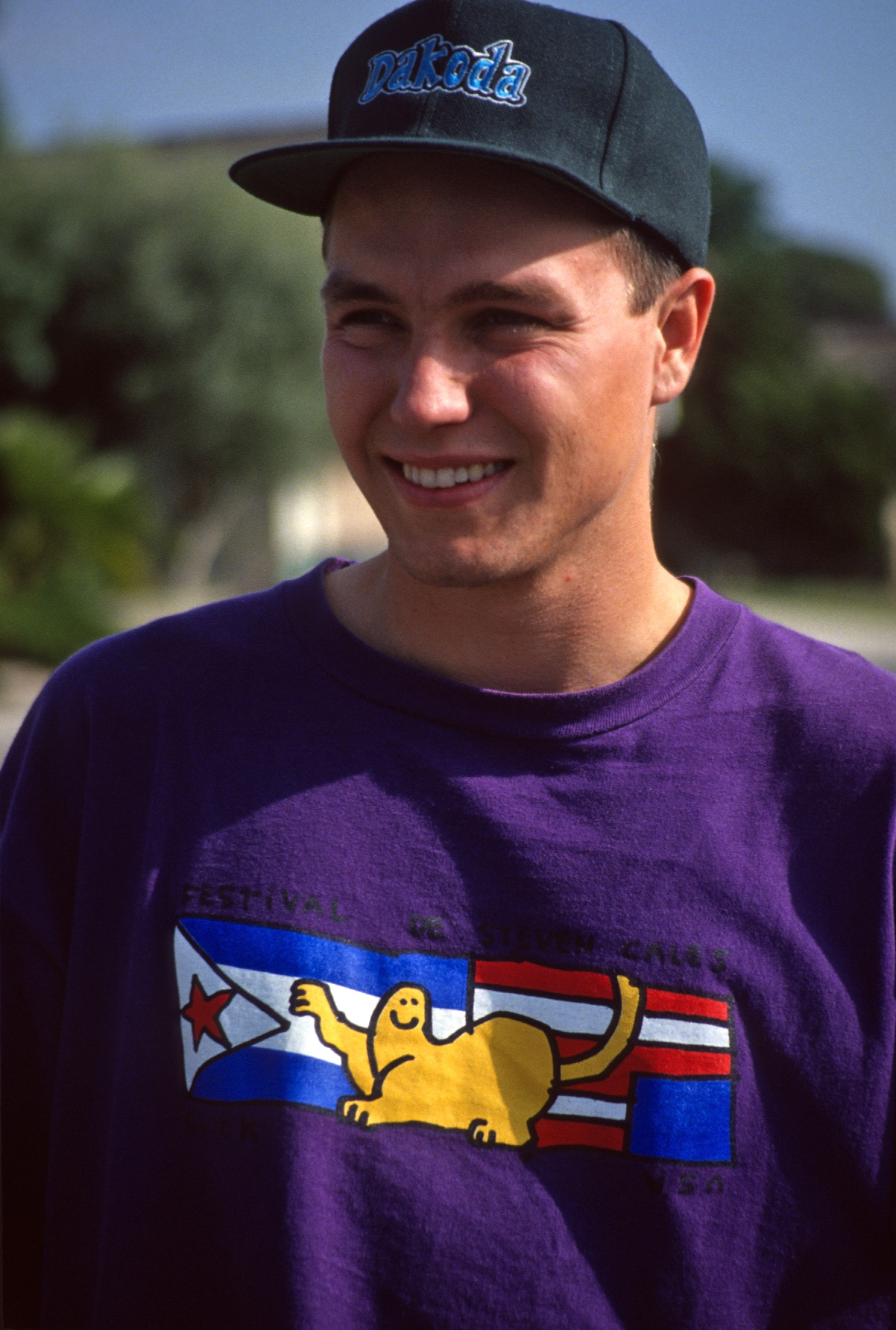
Hoppus at age 22 in 1994

After moving to San Diego in the summer of 1992, Hoppus was reunited with his sister Anne Hoppus, to whom he expressed his desire to be in a band. Anne attended Rancho Bernardo High School, and had become friends with new student Tom DeLonge over the summer. In August 1992, Anne introduced the two, and Hoppus and DeLonge immediately began performing music in DeLonge's garage. To impress DeLonge, Hoppus climbed to the top of a streetlight outside of DeLonge's home – however, he broke both ankles on the way down, resulting in being on crutches for the next few weeks. DeLonge recalled the meeting in 2000: "When I first met Mark, we were running around naked, doing weird stuff. We were up skateboarding until late hours of the morning, antagonizing security guards, and we were just always having fun." DeLonge recruited old friend Scott Raynor from his days at Poway to become the drummer for the new band, named blink.

Hoppus and his girlfriend at this time lived in a basement apartment, barely scraping together funds to pay rent. With money in savings, Hoppus went out and bought his first professional equipment: a new amp and bass cabinet. He came home and his girlfriend proceeded to argue with him, angry that he spent money on something they did not need. "I just kept telling her that this was what mattered to me, this was my life," Hoppus recalled. She demanded he make a choice between the band and her, which resulted in Hoppus leaving the band shortly after formation. Shortly thereafter, DeLonge told Hoppus he had borrowed a four track recorder from a friend and was preparing to record a demo tape, which prompted Hoppus to break up with his girlfriend and return to the band. Flyswatter—a combination of original songs and punk covers—was recorded in Raynor's bedroom and landed the band their first shows. Three more demos were recorded over the course of 1993 and the band began performing its irreverent live show at local all-ages venue SOMA, which alerted local independent label Cargo Music. Cargo signed the band on a trial basis, and Hoppus was the only member to sign the contract, as DeLonge was at work at the time and Raynor was still a minor. During this time, Hoppus lived at home in San Diego at his mother's, where the band would prepare cassette demos and the entire family would fold cassette inserts. Raynor, whose parents moved to Reno, Nevada, stayed with Hoppus in summer 1994.

Blink's first album, Cheshire Cat (1995), was a strong seller for the independent band and would come to be regarded as iconic within the skate punk scene. In 1995, the band signed on for their first national tour, which extended as far as the East Coast. The band purchased their own tour van and embarked on the GoodTimes tour with Unwritten Law, Sprung Monkey and 7 Seconds. The band slowly built a young, devoted following with indie recordings and an endless series of performances and various clubs and festivals. MCA Records signed the band in 1996 and would co-distribute their next release, the sophomore effort Dude Ranch. Hoppus penned the record's lead single, "Dammit", which became a nationwide rock radio hit single as the band toured on the Vans Warped Tour.

==== Multi-platinum success and +44 ====
Hoppus grew increasingly lonely on these tours, having no significant other while other band members did. The exhaustive schedule created tensions within the band, who would fire Raynor in the summer of 1998 in mysterious circumstances never fully explained. With new drummer Travis Barker behind the kit, the trio hit the studio with producer Jerry Finn and recorded Enema of the State, which launched the band's career, catapulting them into the "stratosphere of pop music" and solidifying them as the biggest pop punk act of the era. Three singles were released from the record—"What's My Age Again?", "All the Small Things", and "Adam's Song"—that crossed over into Top 40 radio format and experienced major commercial success. Hoppus got married in 2000 (see Personal life) just before the band prepared to record their highly anticipated follow-up, Take Off Your Pants and Jacket (2001). Hoppus felt complacent creatively but DeLonge felt otherwise, creating post-hardcore side project Box Car Racer to experiment with ideas he deemed unsuitable for blink.

Hoppus felt betrayed (Barker was also in Box Car Racer) and a rift developed between Hoppus and DeLonge that would carry on into the band's future. When the band regrouped to record their next record in 2003, all of the members had become fathers (or, in the case of Barker, becoming one) and the trio took a darker, more "mature" direction with their untitled fifth studio album, infusing experimentalist elements into their usual pop punk sound partially inspired by Box Car Racer. Unresolved feelings from that project would arise in late 2004 when the band began to argue regarding their future and recording process. The February 2005 breakup of blink-182 affected Hoppus greatly: "I had no idea what to do. After blink broke up I had such a loss of identity and purpose. I just had a giant sense of void." Hoppus then began to work on even darker, electronic demos with Barker in his kitchen. He also turned to producing, hitting the studio with Motion City Soundtrack to record Commit This to Memory (2005). In October 2005, Hoppus and Barker purchased a studio together (named Opra Music), where they would bring together a full band to expand upon those electronic demos, creating +44's When Your Heart Stops Beating (2006).

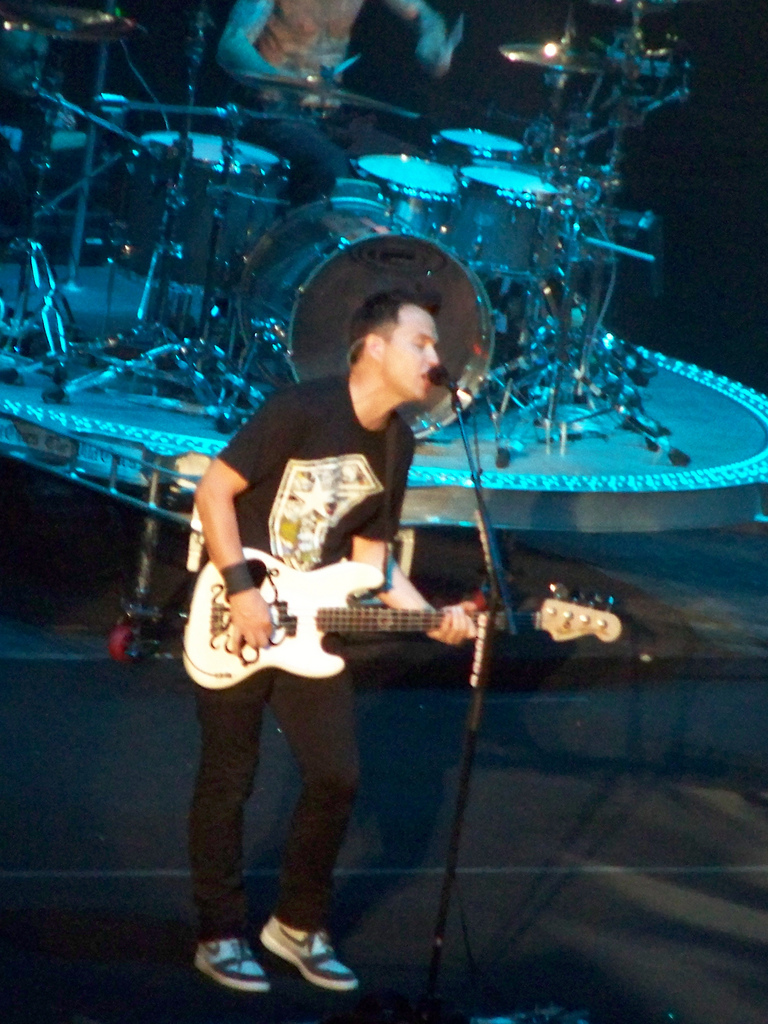
Hoppus performing in 2009

The record, by all accounts, sold poorly and received mixed reviews in the music press. Hoppus and Barker continued touring on the Honda Civic Tour and commenced work on a second +44 album. The August 2008 death of friend and producer Jerry Finn deeply affected Hoppus, who referred to Finn as a lifelong friend and mentor. The following month, Barker and collaborator Adam Goldstein (aka DJ AM), were involved in a plane crash that killed four people, leaving Barker and Goldstein the only survivors. Hoppus immediately boarded a plane to the burn unit, and DeLonge reconnected with the duo under the tragic circumstances. When the band regrouped in the studio for a day, past acrimony vanished with near immediacy. Regarding these experiences, Hoppus wrote, "The events of the past two months supersede everything that happened before. Life is too short." In February 2009, the band's official website was updated with a statement: "To put it simply, We're back. We mean, really back. Picking up where we left off and then some. In the studio writing and recording a new album. Preparing to tour the world yet again. Friendships reformed. 17 years deep in our legacy."

==== Reunion and recent events ====
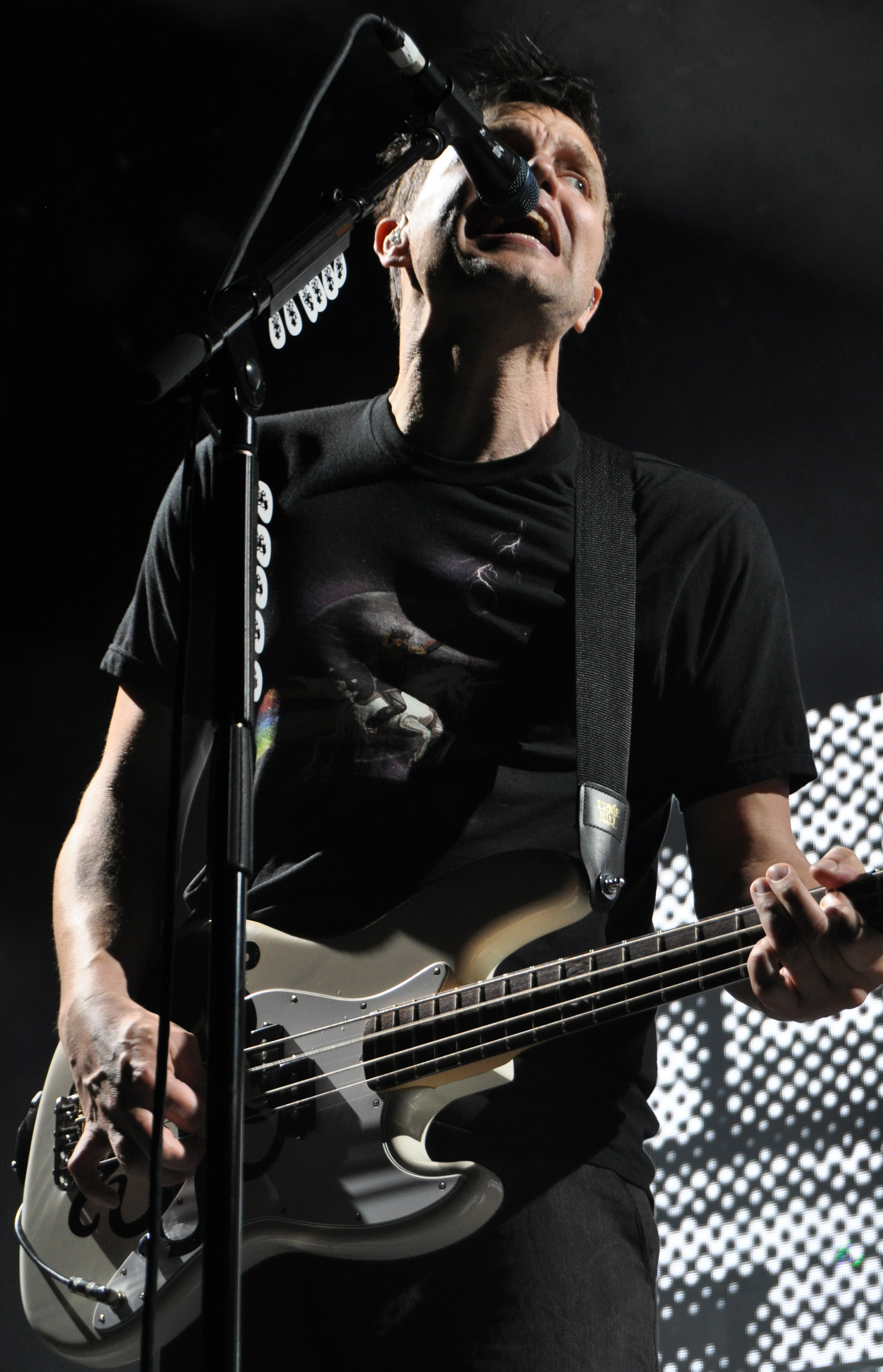
Hoppus performing with Blink-182 in 2011

The band reconnected musically and emotionally on the reunion tour, but were still "on eggshells" throughout the recording of their comeback album. The recording's delay was due to the way the band chose to work – in bits and pieces, alone and together, in a pair of California studios – in addition to each member's busy schedules. The band struggled to record juggling individual priorities; in the case of Hoppus, his new television show Hoppus on Music required him flying to New York once a week. Hoppus moved to London with his family late in the recording process, also complicating matters. The band's comeback album, Neighborhoods (2011), debuted high but undersold label expectations, and Blink-182 parted with Interscope Records in 2012, going independent for their next release, the EP Dogs Eating Dogs.

The band toured Australia in February 2013 without Barker, who did not attend due to his fear of flying (Brooks Wackerman of Bad Religion filled in for him). The band toured the United States in September 2013, where they planned to begin writing songs for their seventh studio album. "We're hoping to head into the studio next year [and to have the] album out in late spring/early summer," Hoppus told Kerrang!. In the interim, Hoppus began recording songs with frequent engineer and producer Chris Holmes that the duo plan to release by the end of the year. "We probably have seven or eight songs in various stages of completion," Hoppus remarked in August 2013. "I still haven't chosen a name [for the project] yet; we still have to figure that out. It's like guitar mixed with electronics…. at this point." Hoppus will share lead vocals with Holmes on the tracks. On April 25, 2014, Hoppus announced, via Twitter, the name of the band as Nothing and Nobody. Their first album is expected to be released in the "not-too-distant future".

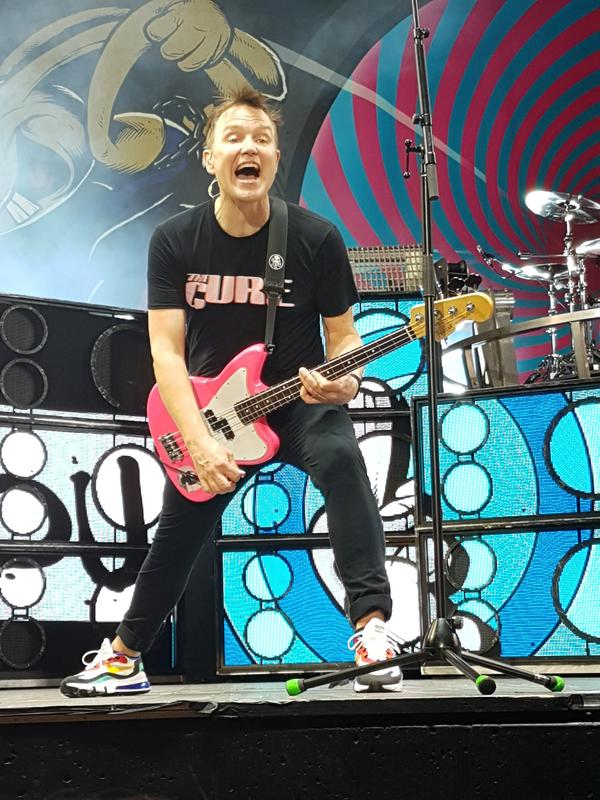
Hoppus performing in 2019

In 2015, blink-182 played three shows in California. With the departure of Tom DeLonge from the band, Matt Skiba of Alkaline Trio, filled in. It was the first time Hoppus performed under the name "blink-182" without DeLonge by his side. The shows were on March 18, March 20, and March 22. Hoppus later hired Skiba full-time, and blink-182 recorded two albums with him, 2016's California and 2019's Nine before DeLonge returned to the band in 2022.

Hoppus has also performed DJ sets at Emo Nite in Los Angeles on several occasions from 2015 to 2017.

In non-musical endeavors, Hoppus launched his own clothing line, Hi My Name is Mark (stylized as "HiMyNameIsMark"), in July 2013.

=== Simple Creatures ===
On January 24, 2019, Hoppus announced he was forming a new group with Alex Gaskarth of All Time Low called Simple Creatures. A debut song called "Drug" was released in January, followed by their first EP, Strange Love, on March 29, 2019. Their second EP, Everything Opposite, was released on October 11, 2019. Since 2020 the project has been on hiatus.

== Musical style ==
=== Songwriting ===
Hoppus's bass playing is characterized by a prominent midrange tone, combining a tight, defined low end with an aggressive upper-midrange presence and clear treble. He has described his approach to the instrument as a combination of traditional bass and rhythm guitar, allowing him to fill out the sound of Blink-182's three-piece lineup while complementing Tom DeLonge's guitar parts. His basslines are frequently structured around Travis Barker's kick drum patterns and DeLonge's melodies, emphasizing the interplay between the three instruments. Although he considers his technique largely unchanged throughout his career, he has noted a shift from predominantly eighth-note downstrokes toward greater use of syncopation and closer alignment with Barker's kick patterns. Hoppus developed his playing style by learning songs by the Cure, Bad Religion, and the Descendents, and has described his technique as largely unchanged since his early years. His use of bass chords was inspired by the English rock band Ned's Atomic Dustbin, whose two-bassist arrangement combined root-note basslines with higher-register chords.

Hoppus also frequently composes songs on guitar rather than bass, describing the instrument as "another human voice". He wrote the guitar riffs for "Dammit" and "What's My Age Again?", and contributed previously uncredited guitar performances to Neighborhoods (2011). He primarily writes most of his songs on an acoustic guitar. He is self-taught, "and consequently I don't have the best technique", he remarked in 2004. "I think you would learn how to paint by painting, rather than reading books about painters or painting and I think it's the same with music. You learn by doing and getting influences from other artists."

Hoppus is known for his signature stage leap. In 2012, Hoppus starred in the CollegeHumor comedy sketch Bassists Look Too Bored, portraying a speaker at a fictional bassists' convention who humorously encourages musicians to adopt a more energetic stage presence.

=== Equipment ===
==== Bass guitars ====
Hoppus began his career playing Fender Precision Basses, inspired by seeing the Cure bassist Simon Gallup perform with one in the music video for "Just like Heaven". He later described the instrument as a "workhorse" and a standard of bass guitar design. Hoppus has been a longtime user of Ernie Ball strings and his instruments are strung with Super Slinky Bass strings (.45-.100).

From 1995 to 1998, Hoppus used a Music Man StingRay as his primary stage bass. While recording Enema of the State, Hoppus used his StingRay as well as a Fender Precision and Jazz Bass. In 2021, he revealed he stopped using the StingRay as he thought they sounded too "clanky".

After primarily recording with the two Fender basses on Enema of the State, Hoppus worked with Fender to design a signature model, which consisted of a Jazz Bass body with a Precision Bass neck and pickup. This model debuted in 2000. In 2006, Fender manufactured an updated variant of Hoppus' signature Jazz Bass with the pickup, a Seymour Duncan Quarter Pound (SPB-3), reversed from its standard position. He developed it in collaboration with producer Jerry Finn. The reversed pickup configuration was intended to provide greater attack on the E and A strings and increased low-end response on the D and G strings, resulting in a more balanced tone across the instrument.

In 2015, Hoppus switched to Fender Jaguar Basses with the same configuration as his 2006 model. However, he still occasionally uses his original signature Jazz Basses; he notably used them extensively alongside his Jaguar Basses on the band's 2023 reunion tour, and the One More Time... album and tour. In 2022, Hoppus teamed up with Fender to release a signature Jaguar Bass sold exclusively through his website Hi My Name Is Mark. To date, it has been released in his signature hot pink color as well as Daphne Blue, with each color being released in limited runs based on customer demand. In 2024, Fender officially released a limited edition signature Jaguar Bass in sunburst and Sea Foam Green colors.

==== Amps ====
For live sound, Hoppus originally plugged his basses into three Ampeg SVT Classic bass heads running into two Ampeg 8x10 SVT bass cabs. Prior to the use of the all-tube SVT Classic heads, Hoppus used two Ampeg SVT-4 Pro heads which only feature a tube preamp. After the Neighborhoods album release, Hoppus used New Vintage amplifiers and cabinets, specifically the Undertow 300 amplifier and NW 8x10 bass cabinets. In 2016, he began using Kemper Profiler amps in concert.

He now uses a Neural DSP Quad Cortex amplifier modeler, which reproduces various amplifier tones and feeds a power amplifier connected to an Ampeg-style 8×10 speaker cabinet. Despite the accuracy of digital modeling, Hoppus has expressed a preference for the physical sound and air movement of a traditional speaker cabinet onstage.

== Non-musical endeavors ==
Hoppus and Tom DeLonge co-owned two companies, Atticus and Macbeth Footwear, Hoppus has since sold his share in both companies; as well as loserkids.com.

Mark Hoppus has made several acting appearances in films and television, often as part of Blink-182. He first appeared as a member of a garage band in the hugely successful teen comedy American Pie (1999) with bandmates Tom DeLonge and Travis Barker, (Though the film's credits list Barker as Scott Raynor.) He appeared again with DeLonge, singing a cover of Jan and Dean's "Dead Man's Curve" in the CBS television movie Shake, Rattle and Roll: An American Love Story (1999). Hoppus and DeLonge hosted the MTV show You Idiot! in 1999. The band appeared in the Two Guys and a Girl episode "Au Revoir, Pizza Place" in 1999, as well as an animated cameo in The Simpsons episode "Barting Over" in 2003. The band made a guest appearance on MADtv in 2002, in a segment titled "Leave It to Blink-182", spoofing 1950s-era sitcoms. Hoppus was a guest actor on an episode of the show Haunted in 2002. In 2011, he appeared in the documentary film The Other F Word. Hoppus was featured as a panelist on the comedy show Never Mind the Buzzcocks in 2012.

He also wrote columns for Risen Magazine's March/April and May/June 2005 issues entitled "Beyond Us". Mark Hoppus has been confirmed to be a part of a documentary about modern punk music entitled One Nine Nine Four. The film was due to be released in 2009 but has been delayed.

In 2010, he joined the 9th annual Independent Music Awards judging panel to assist independent musicians' careers.

Mark Hoppus worked to help relief efforts in Japan after the devastating earthquake and tsunami Tōhoku. He announced that Blink-182 would be auctioning off items to benefit the American Red Cross on EBay. "So sad for what's happening in Japan. Gonna dig in the bins & find some old Blink-182 items to auction for the Red Cross" said Mark. The items auctioned off included the original lyrics sheet to the group's hits "The Rock Show" and "Adam's Song", a Bad Religion autographed cymbal, a hand-painted 1.5 FT tall Bunny, a Blink-182 tour backstage pass, stickers, postcard/magnets, trading cards, the band's dressing room sign from the 2000 VMAs, and his orange sweater from the "Dammit" music video. Among the 33 items auctioned off for charity, he totaled 4,318 dollars.

=== HiMyNameIsMark (2005, 2012–present) ===
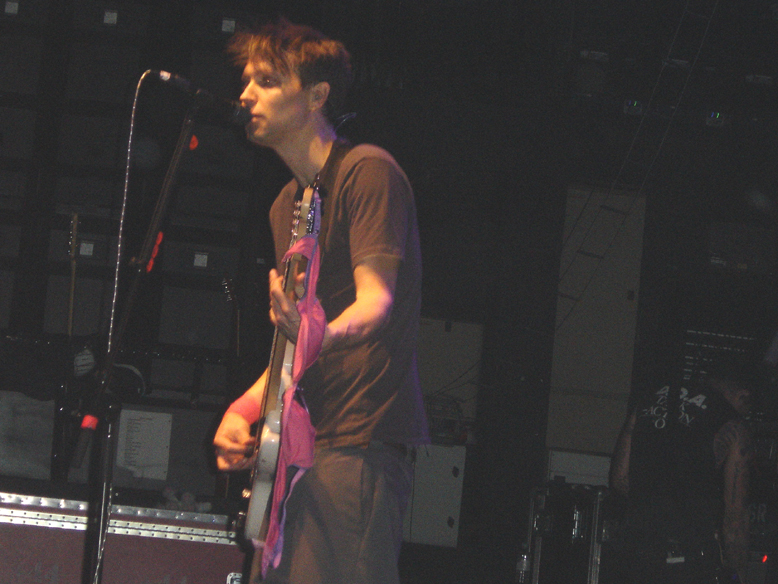
Hoppus performing in 2007

"HiMyNameIsMark" is a podcast that was set up in the wake of the Blink-182 hiatus by Hoppus, and can be found at HiMyNameIsMark.com. Every few weeks he released a show of songs by underground bands, interviews with band members and/or friends, and reminisces about happenings in his life. He is often joined on the show by his friends Chris Holmes (+44's engineer) and James Ingram (+44's assistant engineer). Hoppus has also created various side projects including "Hopp on Popp" where he reviews one of his favorite up and coming artists, some of which have been Matt & Kim, fun., and Japandroids. In late 2014, the podcast returned from a hiatus.

In 2012, "HiMyNameIsMark" rebranded itself as a clothing company, selling apparel and accessories branded with an octopus logo.

=== Hoppus on Music (2010–2012) ===
On June 22, 2010, Fuse announced that Hoppus would be hosting his own weekly, one-hour television series entitled A Different Spin with Mark Hoppus. In relation to the press release, Hoppus stated "I am stoked to join the Fuse family and have a show where I can talk about a topic that I'm passionate about, music. More importantly, I'm excited to force millions of people to watch me on a weekly basis on national television." According to Fuse senior vice president of programming and development Sal LoCurto, "A Different Spin with Mark Hoppus was developed to complement the wide variety of music programming on Fuse – including live concerts, festival coverage and in-depth interview series with the biggest names in music. On August 5, Hoppus revealed the co-host of the show would be comedian Amy Schumer."

The show focuses on music news, fun panel discussions and special reports from the show's correspondents. The show also features musical performances by both mainstream and emerging bands. The show officially premiered on September 16, 2010, on Fuse. The show's second season premiered in March 2011 and the show was re-titled Hoppus on Music.

=== After School Radio (since 2020) ===
On August 18, 2020, the first episode of Hoppus's newest podcast entitled After School Radio would premiere on Apple Music. The podcast is hosted weekly by Hoppus, where he focuses on the artists, music, and culture that have defined the alternative genre.

Most notably, the August 3, 2021 episode titled "The Mark and Tom Show" reunited Hoppus with then former bandmate Tom DeLonge.

=== Fahrenheit-182 (2025) ===
In April 2025, Hoppus's autobiography Fahrenheit-182 was published. The book, co-written by journalist Dan Ozzi, details the rise of Blink-182 as well as Hoppus's battle with cancer. It received positive reviews.

== Personal life ==
Hoppus met former MTV talent executive Skye Everly in August 1999, at a rehearsal for the music video of "All the Small Things", and they later married on December 2, 2000. According to a 2004 interview, she initially refused to date him. Hoppus elaborated, "Tom [DeLonge] always used to embarrass me. Any girl he'd talk to, he'd say, 'Hey, you wanna go on a date with Mark?' He asked Skye, my wife, who looked at me and said, 'No.' That's how it all started." Their son, Jack, was born in 2002.

Hoppus stands 6 ft 2 in (1.88 m) tall. In 2004, he revealed that he votes for the Libertarian Party. He said, "To me, it means to respect other people and let them do their own thing. The government is there to help people but not control them." A 2000 Rolling Stone profile noted that he "pray[s] every night", and he said of his religious views in 2005, "It's amazing to me that anyone can say that one thing is right. [...] To draw lines over something that none of us on earth could possibly comprehend seems like a waste of time." Hoppus was a vegan for many years, though he returned to eating meat at his doctor's recommendation following his cancer diagnosis in 2021.

In 2011, Hoppus and his family relocated to the Mayfair area of London, England, as they wanted Jack to "grow up with a wide view of the world." They remained in London until 2014, when they moved back to the US and have since settled in Beverly Hills, California. During his time in London, he enjoyed jogging in the city's parks and became a supporter of Premier League football club Chelsea F.C. Hoppus is also a devout supporter of the NFL's Los Angeles Rams.

Hoppus is a supporter of Children's Hospital Los Angeles (CHLA); his wife, Skye, is a CHLA Foundation Trustee and the Chair of CHLA's Child Life Council, and has actively volunteered at the hospital since 2015.

Hoppus is a longtime admirer of graffiti and street art. He was the owner of Crude Oil (Vettriano), a 2005 painting by Banksy that was put up for auction in March 2025; it sold for $5.4 million, with proceeds being split between Hoppus (who plans to use it to buy art from up-and-coming artists), Children’s Hospital Los Angeles, Cedars Sinai Hematology Oncology Research, and the California Fire Foundation in the wake of the state's wildfires.

=== Health issues ===
On June 23, 2021, Hoppus revealed that he was undergoing treatment for cancer after accidentally sharing a picture of himself undergoing chemotherapy treatment to his public Instagram Story. On July 11, he said that he was experiencing stage 4 diffuse large B-cell lymphoma. On September 29 of the same year, Hoppus announced that he was declared cancer-free, but would continue to be screened every 6 months in case the cancer returns.

== Discography ==
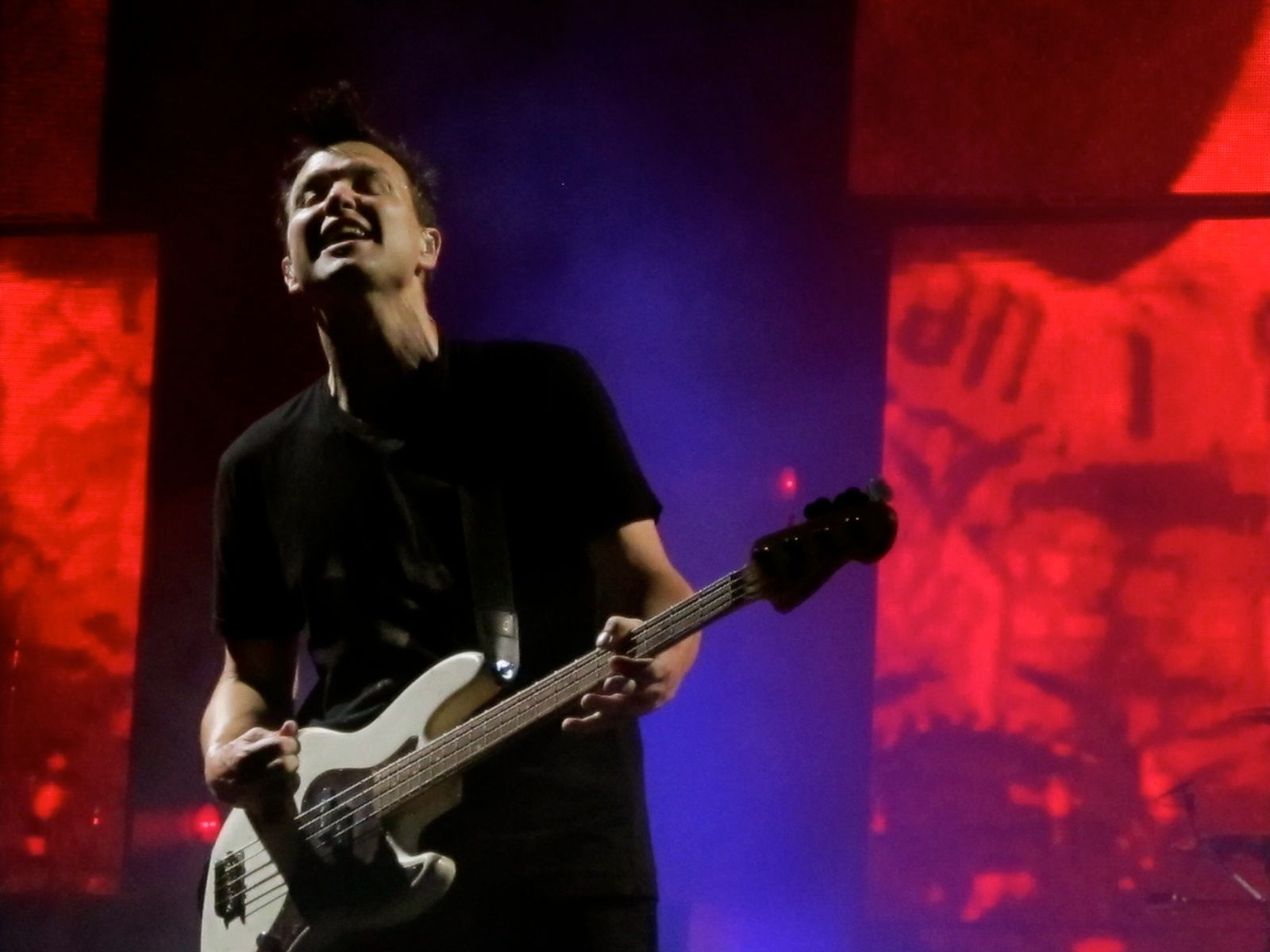
Hoppus performing with Blink-182 in 2011

=== With +44 ===
Studio album:

- When Your Heart Stops Beating (2006)

=== With Simple Creatures ===
EPs:

- Strange Love (2019)
- Everything Opposite (2019)

== Filmography ==
Year	Title	Role	Notes
1999	American Pie	Himself	
2026	Travis Barker: Louder Than Fear	Himself	
