= Can I Say (book) =

2015 autobiography by Travis Barker

Can I Say: Living Large, Cheating Death, and Drums, Drums, Drums
- First edition
- Authors: Travis Barker; Gavin Edwards
- Cover artist: Willie Toledo (photograph); James Iacobelli (design)
- Language: English
- Subject: Autobiography
- Publisher: William Morrow and Company
- Publication date: October 20, 2015 (hardback)
- Publication place: United States
- Pages: 473
- ISBN: 978-0062319432

Can I Say is a 2015 autobiography by American drummer Travis Barker, written with the help of Rolling Stone and New York Times contributor Gavin Edwards. It was published on October 20, 2015, by William Morrow and Company. The book features contributions from many of Barker's friends and family members, including members of Blink-182, Transplants, and The Aquabats.

== Summary and themes ==
Barker dedicated the book to his family. The book opens with Barker's first-hand account of surviving his 2008 plane crash, before discussing his early life.

The book chronicles Barker's childhood, his vegan diet, and his early love of drumming, as well as the formation of his companies Famous Stars and Straps and LaSalle Records. He also discusses the break-ups of Blink-182 and the Meet the Barkers reality show.

Barker also relates his marriages to Melissa Kennedy and Shanna Moakler, and his relationship with Paris Hilton. He discusses his battles with sex addiction and drug addiction, his fear of flying, and his friendship with Adam "DJ AM" Goldstein, whose death he describes as having a profound effect on him.

== Release and reception ==
William Morrow and Company released an initial hardcover printing of 100,000 copies on October 20, 2015. with a paperback version released on September 6, 2016. An audiobook, narrated by Cary Hite and produced by Buck 50 Productions, came out on September 15, 2016.

Billboard called the book a "riveting, brutally honest memoir", while Rolling Stone called it "a fascinating look into the life of a talented, hard-partying musician who has beaten the odds several times." Not all reviews were positive, however, with New Noise Magazine reviewer John B. Moore writing, "Is the book honest? I guess; is it salacious? You bet; is it worth more the read? Not if you've evolved past dick jokes."

Barker said it was hard doing the press for the book, due to frequently being asked to comment on the plane crash and his addiction problems on talk shows; he said he was also disappointed by the headlines of articles about the book focusing on his relationships and the more outrageous parts of the memoir. However, Barker told The Toronto Sun that he was happy with how honest the book was, saying, "Some of the stuff in the book makes my skin crawl with shame. But it was important to say it."
