= Fix Your Face Vol. 2 - Coachella '09 =

FIX YOUR FACE, Volume 2 - Coachella '09

Mixtape by TRV$DJAM
- Released: June 1, 2009
- Genre: Drum and bass, turntablism
- Length: 50:28

FIX YOUR FACE VOL. 2 - Coachella '09 is the second DJ mix released by TRV$DJAM. It features Travis Barker on drums and DJ AM spinning records.

The release includes their live performance at Coachella Valley Music and Arts Festival and was available via Twitter in May 2009 from the now defunct trvsdjam.com.

The songs were later available via download through SoundCloud.

== Track listing and samples ==
1. Coachella 1
  - At 0:00 - Guns N' Roses - "Welcome to the Jungle"
  - At 1:12 - The Beatles - "Eleanor Rigby"
  - At 2:38 - Bingo Players - "Get Up (Diplo Remix)"
2. Coachella 2
  - At 0:23 - MGMT - "Kids (Soulwax Remix)"
  - At 2:07 - N.W.A - "Dope Man"
  - At 3:07 - Mobb Deep - "Quiet Storm"
3. Coachella 3
  - At 0:07 - Daft Punk - "Da Funk"
  - At 1:43 - Justice - "Phantom"
4. Coachella 4
  - At 0:00 - Bel Biv Devoe - "Poison"
  - At 1:26 - The Mamas and the Papas - "California Dreamin' (Cali Lakes - Sizzahandz Classic Mash Up Version)"
  - At 2:36 - Jay-Z - "Encore"
  - At 3:18 - The Zombies - "Time of the Season"
  - At 3:49 - The Who - "Baba O'Riley"
5. Coachella 5
  - At 0:00 - The Who - "Baba O'Riley (Sebastian Remix)"
  - At 1:51 - Michael Jackson - "Rock with You"
6. Coachella 6
  - At 0:31 - The wiseguys - "Ooh La La"
  - At 1:18 - Metallica - "Enter Sandman"
7. Coachella 7
  - At 0:00 - Michael Jackson - "Wanna Be Startin' Somethin'"
  - At 0:30 - The White Stripes - "Seven Nation Army"
  - At 2:11 - Daft Punk - "One More Time"
8. Coachella 8
  - At 0:00 - Moby - "Bodyrock"
  - At 0:15 - Does It Offend You, Yeah? - "We Are Rockstars"
  - At 1:45 - Yo Majesty - "Club Action"
9. Coachella 9
  - At 0:00 - The Gossip - "Standing in the Way of Control"
  - At 2:38 - Nirvana - "Lithium"
10. Coachella 10
  - At 0:08 - M.I.A. - "Bucky Done Gun"
  - At 0:28 - Bill Conti - "Gonna Fly Now"
  - At 0:40 - Wild Motherfuckers - "Fuck It Up"
  - At 1:10 - The Notorious B.I.G. - "Juicy"
  - At 2:20 - Warren G - "Regulate"
11. Coachella 11
  - At 0:09 - Rage Against the Machine - "Killing in the Name"
  - At 2:40 - Jay-Z - "Public Service Announcement"
12. Coachella 12
  - At 0:00 - Lil Jon - "Snap Ya Fingers"
  - At 0:34 - Foo Fighters - "Everlong"
13. Coachella 13
  - At 0:00 - Lil Jon and the East Side Boyz - "Throw It Up"
  - At 1:32 - Kid Cudi - "Day 'n' Nite"
14. Coachella 14
  - At 0:00 - Bloc Party - "Banquet"
  - At 1:29 - Queen - "Bohemian Rhapsody"
