= Landon Barker =

American rapper and singer (born 2003)

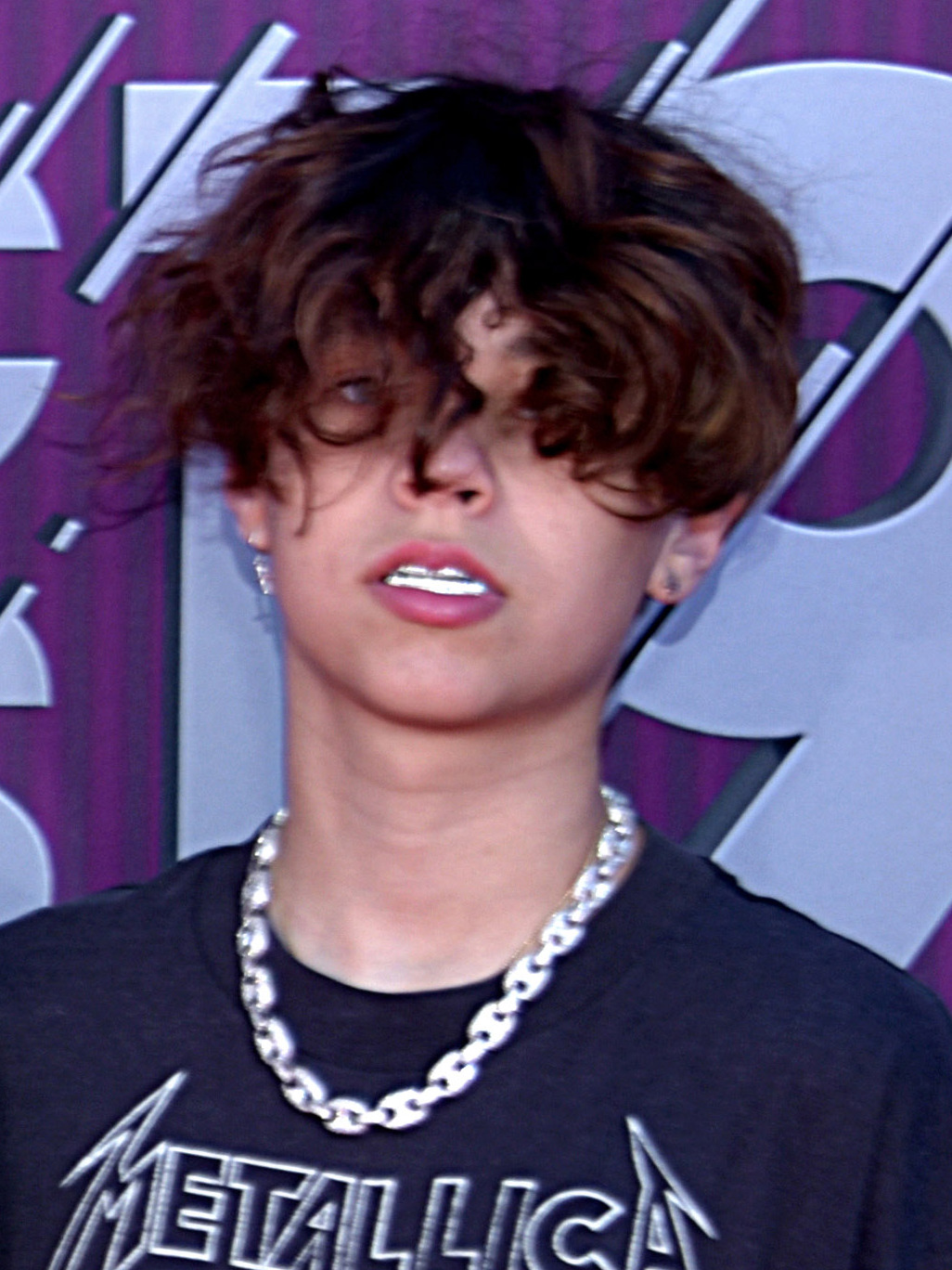
- Barker in 2019
- Born: Landon Asher Barker; October 9, 2003 (age 23); Santa Monica, California, U.S.
- Occupations: Rapper; singer; songwriter
- Labels: DTA; Elektra; Big Loud Rock; Mercury Records
- Television: Meet the Barkers
- Parents: Travis Barker (father); Shanna Moakler (mother)
- Relatives: Kourtney Kardashian (step-mother)

Landon Asher Barker (born October 9, 2003) is an American rapper and singer. The son of Blink-182 drummer Travis Barker, he is best known for his guest performance alongside Gunna and Young Thug on Machine Gun Kelly's 2022 single "Die in California", which entered the Bubbling Under Hot 100 Singles chart at number 15. Barker also appeared alongside his family on the reality television show Meet the Barkers from 2005 to 2006. His 2023 debut single, "Friends With Your EX", was released by Elektra Records.

== Early life ==
Barker was born on October 9, 2003, to musician Travis Barker and actress Shanna Moakler. His first name, Landon, is his father's middle name. Travis Barker and Shanna Moakler married in October 2004, about a year after Barker's birth. Barker's sister, Alabama Barker, was born in 2005. Barker also has an older half-sister, Atiana De La Hoya, Moakler's daughter with ex-fiancé, boxer Oscar De La Hoya. From 2005 to 2006, Barker's family starred in a reality television series, Meet the Barkers, which aired on MTV. His parents divorced in 2008.

In September 2008, his father survived a plane crash, leading to Barker developing a fear of flying.

As a child, Barker traveled with his dad's band, Blink-182, when they toured, which led to Barker's desire to pursue a career in music. Barker began making music of his own at age fifteen.

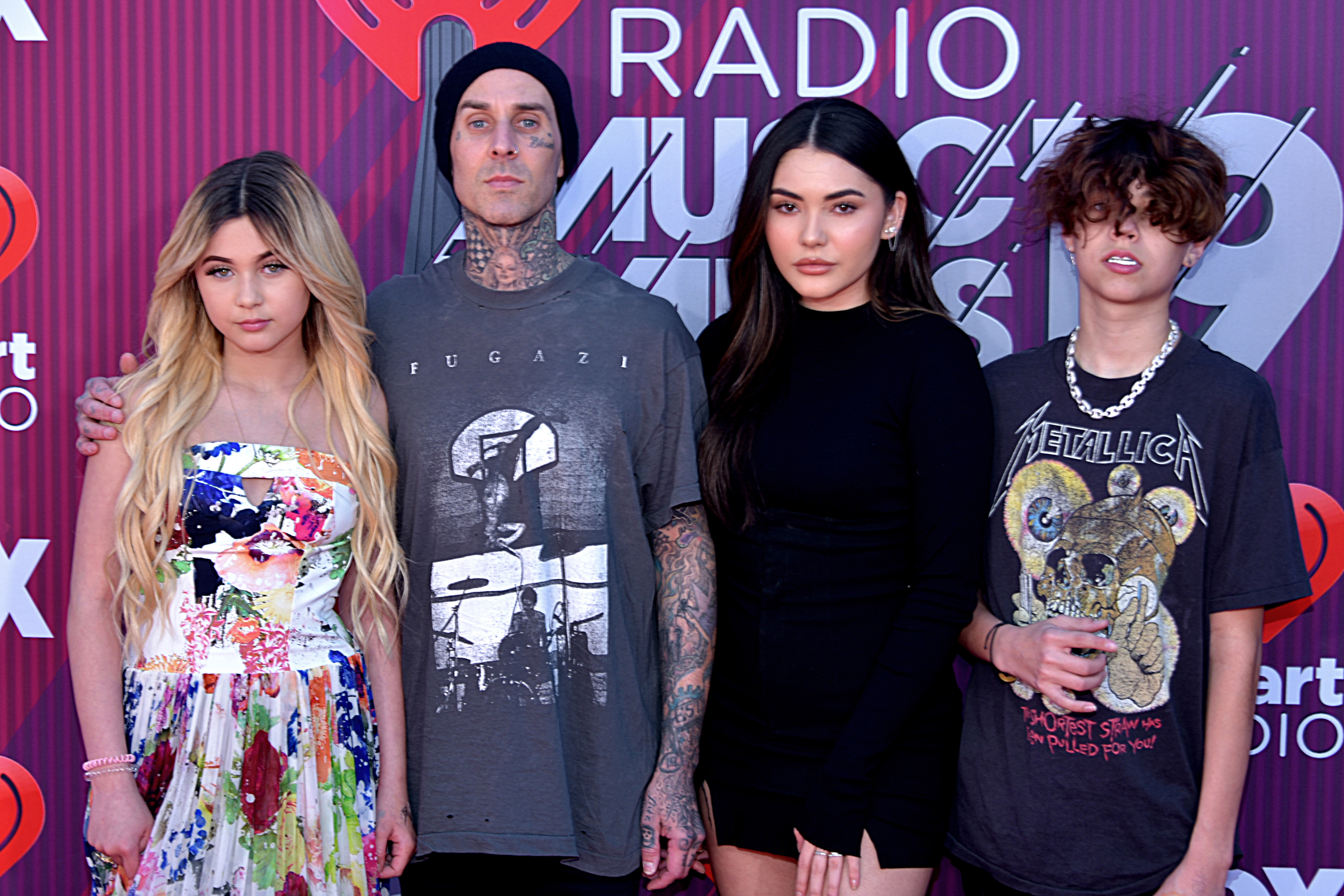
Alabama Barker, Travis Barker, Atiana De La Hoya, and Landon Barker in 2019

In 2020, when Barker was sixteen, his father began dating longtime family friend, Kourtney Kardashian. His father and Kardashian married in May 2022, and Barker gave a speech at their wedding. Through his father's marriage to Kardashian, Barker gained three step-siblings. In November 2023, Kardashian gave birth to Rocky, Barker's half-brother.

Barker graduated from high school in June 2022.

== Career ==
In January 2021, Barker starred in Machine Gun Kelly's film Downfalls High.

On March 25, 2022, Barker was featured on Machine Gun Kelly's song "Die in California". Barker had been working on the track in a studio session while his father and Machine Gun Kelly worked in another session. As Machine Gun Kelly walked by, he heard the track and recorded over the track. Barker posted an excerpt of the song to his TikTok account, hoping to get feedback from fans. Megan Fox, Machine Gun Kelly's girlfriend at the time, heard the excerpt and pushed them to collaborate further. The song was re-recorded and released on Machine Gun Kelly's album, Mainstream Sellout. In June 2022, Barker made a guest appearance to perform the song at Machine Gun Kelly's sold-out Madison Square Garden show. That same month, Barker released a fashion collection that he co-designed with boohooMAN.

In October 2022, Barker played a special show at the Roxy Theatre in Los Angeles and performed an unreleased collaboration with his dad.

In 2023, Barker signed to his father's record label, Elektra Imprint DTA Records. In an interview, Barker stated "My dad would be like, 'Show me that you want to sign'... I feel like I had to prove myself to get the opportunity to sign to them." In September 2023, Barker released his debut single, "Friends With Your EX", which features his dad, Travis Barker on drums and production. A music video was released, featuring Barker's then-girlfriend, Charli D'Amelio. The song is about Barker's former friend Huddy, who previously dated D'Amelio. Huddy and Barker were friends for years, both starring in Machine Gun Kelly's film Downfalls High.

On March 22, 2024, Barker released his second single, "Over You," following his split from D'Amelio. In May 2024, Yungblud announced that Barker would join the lineup for Bludfest, a music festival scheduled for August 2024 in the United Kingdom. In July 2024, it was announced that Barker would be joining Blink-182 on some of the upcoming One More Time Tour dates.

== Charted songs ==
List of singles, with selected chart positions, showing year released, album name and certification
| Title | Year | Peak chart positions | | | | | | | | | Certification | Album |
| Title | Year | US | US R&B /HH | US Rock | AUS | CAN | IRE | NZ Hot | UK | WW | Certification | Album |
|---|---|---|---|---|---|---|---|---|---|---|---|---|
| "Die in California" (Machine Gun Kelly featuring Gunna, Young Thug, and Landon Barker) | 2022 | — (Note: "Die in California" did not enter the Billboard Hot 100, but peaked at number 15 on the Bubbling Under Hot 100 Singles chart.) | — | 17 | — | 95 | — | — | — | — | | Mainstream Sellout |

== Personal life ==
In March 2024, Barker announced that he has Tourette syndrome. Barker also has attention deficit hyperactivity disorder, and obsessive–compulsive disorder.

In May 2025, he revealed on Instagram that he was in a relationship with the model Skyla Sanders, the daughter of the model Liberty Ross and the film director Rupert Sanders.
