= Travis Barker: Louder Than Fear =

- Film poster
- Directed by: Justin Krook; Michael Dwyer
- Written by: Justin Krook
- Produced by: Matthew Weaver; Nick Stern
- Starring: Travis Barker; Kourtney Kardashian; Mark Hoppus; Tom DeLonge; Shanna Moakler
- Cinematography: Michael Dwyer
- Edited by: Justin Krook; Brett Mason; Tchavdar Georgiev
- Music by: Matteo Zingales
- Production companies: A Media Weaver; Feed the Soul Production
- Distributed by: Hulu; Disney+
- Release dates: June 13, 2026 (Tribeca); August 13, 2026 (U.S.)
- Running time: 101 minutes
- Country: United States
- Language: English

Travis Barker: Louder Than Fear is a 2026 American documentary film about musician Travis Barker, the drummer for the band Blink-182. Directed by Justin Krook and Michael Dwyer, the film traces Barker's life from his childhood and rise to fame through his 2008 plane crash and its long aftermath, his struggles with addiction, and his relationship with wife Kourtney Kardashian. Filmed over roughly nine years, the documentary premiered at the Tribeca Festival in June 2026 before its release on Hulu and Disney+ on August 13, 2026.

== Background ==
Directors Justin Krook and Michael Dwyer began filming Barker in 2017, initially expecting the project to take only a few years to complete. According to Krook, the production instead stretched to nearly a decade, in part because the filmmakers felt the story lacked a resolution until Barker found closure regarding the 2008 crash that killed several of his friends. Dwyer said the directors had originally proposed devices such as exposure therapy or flight lessons to help give the film an ending, but Barker declined to follow a scripted emotional arc, and the crew instead continued filming as his life evolved.

== Synopsis ==
=== Early life and career ===
The film recounts how a young Barker became interested in drumming after watching the Muppets character Animal, leading his parents to buy him a children's drum kit and enroll him in lessons. It also revisits the death of his mother, Gloria, when Barker was a teenager, and his father's initial objection to his tattoos, which Barker says he got in part because he did not want a conventional job to interfere with a career in music. Interviewees including Mark Hoppus and Tom DeLonge describe how Barker, then playing with the ska band the Aquabats, filled in as Blink-182's drummer on short notice around 1998 after learning the band's songs backstage, and was made a permanent member soon after.

=== Addiction ===
The documentary details how Barker's longstanding fear of flying led him to begin taking painkillers before flights, a habit that escalated into dependence on opioids such as OxyContin and Vicodin. His ex-wife Shanna Moakler recalls that at the height of his addiction Barker was consuming around 20 to 30 pills a day, and Barker says he eventually employed a security guard whose job included watching him sleep to make sure he kept breathing. Barker also discusses his first marriage, to Melissa Kennedy, and his marriage to Moakler, with whom he had two children, Landon and Alabama, and became stepfather to her daughter Atiana.

=== 2008 plane crash ===
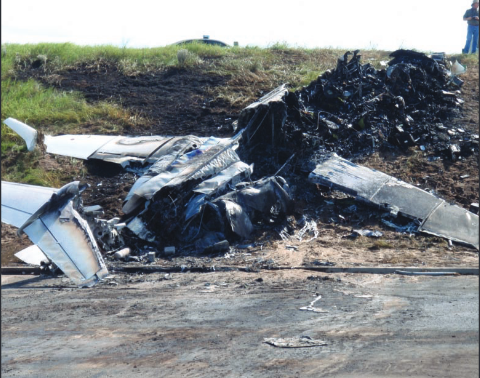
Remains of the plane crash.

A central section of the film addresses the September 19, 2008, crash of a private jet carrying Barker, Adam "DJ AM" Goldstein, assistant Chris Baker, and security guard Charles "Ché" Still, which occurred on takeoff from Columbia, South Carolina. Four of the six people aboard were killed, including both pilots along with Baker and Still; Barker and Goldstein were the only survivors. Barker recalls that his daughter Alabama cried inconsolably before he left for the flight, repeating that "the roof" was going to come off, and that he considered pulling out of the trip. He describes suffering third-degree burns over 65 percent of his body, broken ribs, and a back fractured in four places, and says doctors discussed amputating his foot. Barker underwent dozens of surgeries and multiple skin grafts during a hospital stay of more than three months, and says he experienced suicidal thoughts during his recovery. Goldstein, the crash's other survivor, died of a drug overdose in August 2009, which Barker says intensified his sense of survivor's guilt.

=== Relationship with Kourtney Kardashian ===
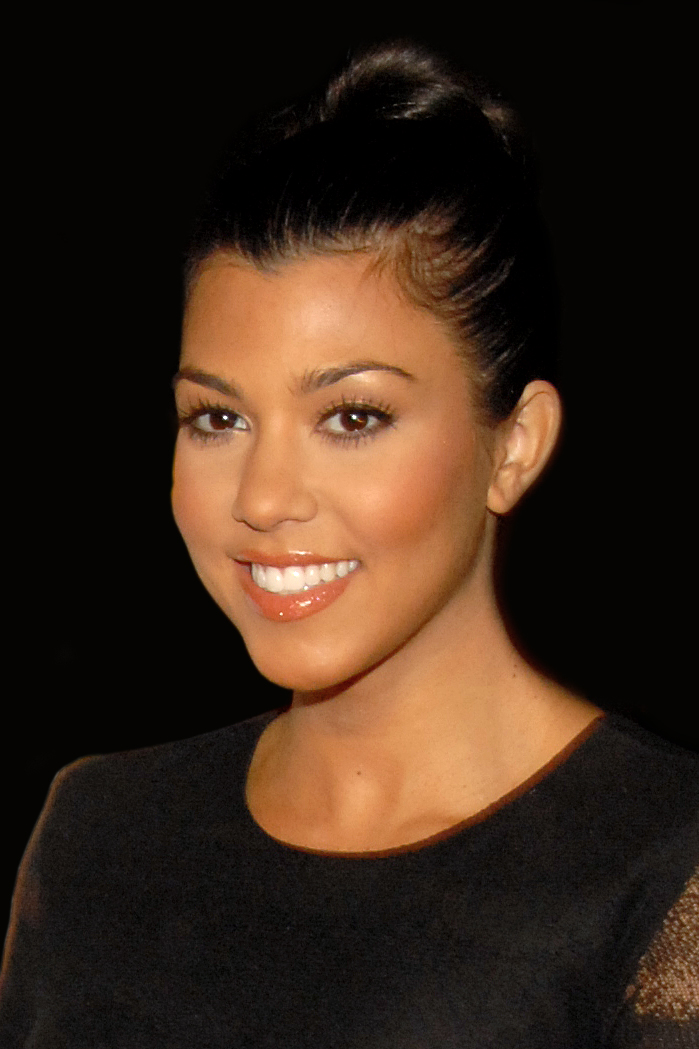
Kourtney Kardashian in 2009.

The film follows the development of Barker's relationship with Kardashian, who has said that watching him with his children drew her to him. The couple discuss a pregnancy loss roughly six months into their relationship, when doctors told them a daughter they had planned to name Tulip no longer had a heartbeat, as well as their subsequent difficulties conceiving, including five rounds of IVF over about eight months. The couple's son, Rocky, was conceived naturally and born in November 2023; the documentary also touches on a "terrifying" emergency fetal surgery performed during that pregnancy. Kardashian also describes encouraging Barker to fly again, joining him on a 2021 trip to Mexico that marked his first flight since the 2008 crash.

== Cast and appearances ==
In addition to Barker and Kardashian, the film features interviews with Barker's father, Randy Barker, and sister, Tamara Barker; Blink-182 bandmates Mark Hoppus and Tom DeLonge; ex-wife Shanna Moakler; children Landon and Alabama Barker and stepdaughter Atiana De La Hoya; and fellow musicians including, but not limited to, Questlove, Lil Wayne, and Tommy Lee. The documentary also includes a posthumous appearance from Taylor Hawkins, the Foo Fighters drummer who died in 2022, recalling his early friendship with Barker.

The film is in memory of more than a dozen people, including Gloria "Mom" Barker, Jerry Finn, Taylor Hawkins, Fusi, XXXTentacion, Oliver Tree, among others.

== Release ==
Travis Barker: Louder Than Fear premiered at the Tribeca Festival in New York City in June 2026. It began streaming on Hulu and Disney+ on August 13, 2026. The film is available on Disney+ only to subscribers of a combined Disney+/Hulu bundle, as it does not appear on standalone Disney+ accounts.

== Reception ==
Alan French of FandomWire gave the film a score of 7 out of 10, writing that the directors were "able to craft a captivating visual style for Louder Than Fear, using incredible slow-motion cameras and brilliant cinematography to create a glossy experience that highlights Barker's clean life." Alex Hudson of Exclaim! also gave the film a score of 7 out of 10 and wrote, "[I]t's an emotional and fascinating story. Even if I don't always love Barker's music (or the eye-popping gaudiness of his reality TV proposal and marriage), Louder Than Fear shows how his obsessive work ethic is a survival instinct after all he's endured."
