= Gone Too Far (TV series) =

2009 American reality television series

- Genre: Reality television
- Starring: DJ AM
- Country of origin: United States
- Original language: English
- No. of seasons: 1
- No. of episodes: 8

Original release
- Network: MTV
- Release: 12 October 2009

Gone Too Far is a 2009 American reality television series, featuring Adam Goldstein, better known as DJ AM, intervening to help people struggling with drug addiction. MTV debuted the show on October 12, less than two months after DJ AM—who had been sober for nine years before developing the show—relapsed and died from a drug overdose. Eight episodes were made in its single season.

== History ==
Goldstein approached MTV in mid 2008, pitching the idea of a reality show that focused on his life to Tony DiSanto. DiSanto said that such shows were decreasing in popularity, and instead suggested a drug intervention show, with Goldstein agreeing. While the show was still in pre-production in September 2008, Goldstein was injured in the 2008 South Carolina Learjet 60 crash. He subsequently started taking prescription medication for anxiety and pain, which a friend blamed as being the catalyst for his relapse into drug use. During the filming of one episode, Goldstein picked up a crack pipe. According to intervention expert BJ Hickman, who appeared in two episodes, Goldstein was clearly struggling with his addiction, stating "As soon as the cameras stopped, he put [the pipe] down. He had a moment holding that crack pipe, and he had to talk about it. He spoke to his sponsor. He made program calls." MTV hosted a video on their website showing Goldstein speaking about the experience, though they acknowledged removing the video after his death.

Goldstein had recently finished filming the series before his death on August 28, 2009, with eight episodes being shot. He tweeted about finishing filming the series three days before his death, which was suspected to be from a drug overdose. The circumstances of his death threw the status of the show into question, with concerns it may be viewed as hypocritical or exploitative, though others thought his death may give the series a stronger anti-drug message. DiSanto stated "It crosses all of our minds" whether placing Goldstein near other addicts helped contribute to his relapse. Dr Harris Stratyner said that "Doing this show could certainly have been a relapse trigger for Mr. Goldstein", saying that recovering addicts are encouraged to stay away from situations that may place them in temptation. The show's original premiere date was October 5, 2009, though on September 24 Reuters stated it would be unlikely to air by that date. MTV decided to debut it on October 12, less than two months since his death, which had been confirmed to be from drug overdose. Goldstein's family gave MTV approval to air the show, stating:

It is our hope through airing this show that people will get to see the side of Adam that we knew and loved. The decision to air the show has been difficult, but we do this with the profound belief that it will inspire others to seek help.

== Reception ==
Simon Vozick-Levinson from Entertainment Weekly called the announced show well-intentioned, and speculated that Goldstein may be trying to give something back to the world following his survival of the plane crash, though questioned whether the show would be exploitative. Given a rough cut of the first episode shortly after Goldstein's death, Tanner Stransky concluded:

It's definitely an unsettling viewing experience to see Goldstein deal so frankly with the subject of drugs—whether it's buying the pipe or examining a heroin addict’s bruised arms—so soon after his death ... just knowing Goldstein's history with drugs makes watching him counsel others about kicking the habit seem oddly noble and yet disturbing at the same time.

According to Nielsen ratings, 499,000 people watched the first episode. Melissa Camacho from Common Sense Media gave the series three out of five stars, saying "Unfortunately, since Gone Too Far is being aired after Goldstein's fatal overdose, many of the earnest messages he offers about recovery and empowerment are overshadowed by his own inability to beat drug addiction" and concluding the series "shows viewers how an addict, despite his or her own battles and failures, can still reach out to make a positive difference in people's lives. Sadly, the series also serves as a tragic warning about what the end result of drug use can too frequently be."
