= TRV$DJAM =

American musical collaborative duo

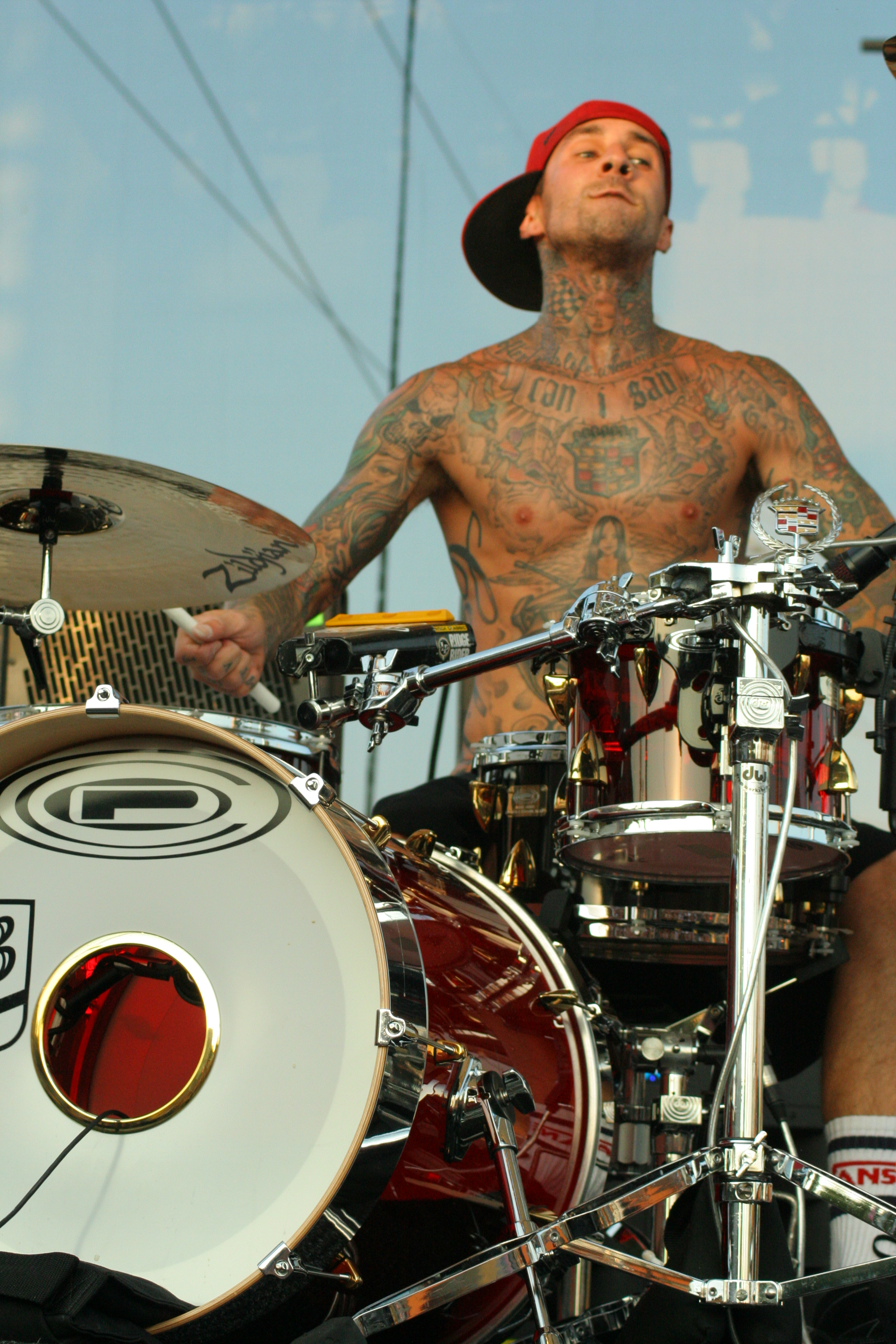
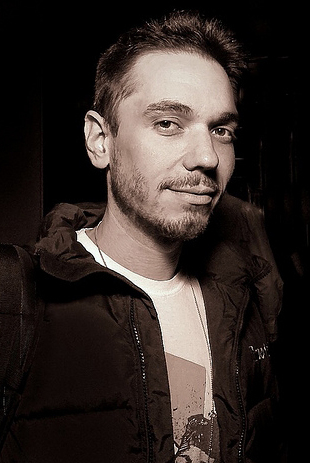
- Travis Barker and DJ AM in 2008

Background information
- Origin: Los Angeles, California, U.S.
- Genres: Drum and bass; turntablism
- Years active: 2008–2009
- Label: LaSalle
- Past members: Travis Barker; DJ AM

TRV$DJAM was a collaboration project between Travis Barker of Blink-182 and Adam Goldstein, a.k.a. DJ AM. They performed their first show on June 25, 2008 at the Roxy and released a mixtape online in August 2008 titled Fix Your Face. In June 2009, they released a second mixtape titled Fix Your Face Vol. 2 (Coachella' 09). Hours after performing for thousands of college students on September 19, 2008 in Columbia, South Carolina, Barker and DJ AM were critically injured in a Learjet crash that killed four people.

Following their two released mixtapes, the duo ceased due to the death of Goldstein on August 28, 2009.

== Discography ==
- Fix Your Face (2008)
- Fix Your Face Vol. 2 - Coachella '09 (2009)
