= Crowned: The Mother of All Pageants =

- Genre: Reality competition
- Created by: Laurie Girion
- Judges: Carson Kressley; Shanna Moakler; Cynthia Garrett
- Country of origin: United States
- Original language: English
- No. of seasons: 1
- No. of episodes: 8

Production
- Executive producer: Laurie Girion
- Production companies: Swim Entertainment; Fox Television Studios

Original release
- Network: The CW
- Release: December 12, 2007 – January 30, 2008

Crowned: The Mother of All Pageants is an eight-episode competition that featured multiple mother-daughter teams working together as pairs to win a beauty pageant competition. The show ran for eight episodes on The CW from December 12, 2007, to January 30, 2008.

The competition was judged by Carson Kressley, Shanna Moakler and television personality Cynthia Garrett.

Each pair attempted to brand a 'style' for their mother/daughter team via clothing and swimwear, create ways of expressing a point of view about issues in the world, and practice for the big pageant dance number. The prize package included a $100,000 cash award, a custom-designed platinum and diamond crown necklace, and tiaras.

The show was a production of Swim Entertainment and Fox Television Studios, with creator/executive producer Laurie Girion (Cheerleader Nation, Last Comic Standing 2).

On May 13, 2008, The CW officially cancelled the series.

== Contestants ==
| Mother & Daughter's Name/Age | New Team's Name | Previous Team's Name | Pageant Experience | Eliminated |
|---|---|---|---|---|
| Andrea (43) & Amanda (24) | Reigning A's | (kept the same team name) | Andrea participated in Mrs. New Mexico, she was voted Mrs. Congeniality and won 4th runner-up. Amanda competed in 3 pageants in high school | Episode 1 |
| Annette (44) & Alana (19) Hoffman | The Realists | Silent But Deadly | Neither of them have any pageant experience. | Episode 2 |
| Pamela (42) & Felicia (21) | Tomboy Queens | (kept the same team name) | Neither of them have any pageant experience. | Episode 3 |
| Jill (39) & Nicole (21) | Goal Getters | Sassy Sisters | Jill has no experience. Nicole won the Miss Delaware USA 2007 title and went on to compete in the Miss USA 2007 pageant. | Episode 4 |
| Brenda (42) & Heather (24) | Goal Driven Gals | Blonde Bombshells | Brenda has no experience. Heather competed in pageants as a child & teen. | Episode 5 |
| Angela (47) & Tenia (26) | Beauty Is Skin Deep | Skin Deep | Angela has no experience. Tenia entered local pageants in Florida at age 19 and won a couple of small titles. Tenia was Top 30 finalist on American Idol season 1 | Episode 6 (They ran away, refusing to cut their sashes because they believed they were "forever Beauty Queens") |
| Ada (38) & Christian (20) | Blessed Beauties | Hot & Not | Ada won Miss Merry Christmas, Albany Texas in 1977. Christian won Miss Photogenic pre-teen Texas. She also competed in three Miss North Texas American Co-ed pageants and two Miss Florida American Co-ed pageants. | Episode 7 |
| Patty (48) & Laura (23) | Sincere Sexy Reds | Redheaded Bombshells | Patty placed first and second runner-up and received 'most talented' for an original medley of songs played on the piano for the Jr. Miss Scholarship pageant. Laura has no pageant experience. | Episode 8, in an Ambush de-sashing, resulting in them finishing in 4th place. |
| Gina (49) & Hollis (27) | Dream Gals | Kept the same team name | Neither of them have any pageant experience. | Episode 8, 3rd place |
| Mindy (40) & Rachelle (24) | Gifted Dolls | Diamond Dolls | Mindy placed 3rd runner-up in the Mrs. Arizona International pageant. Rachelle has competed since she was 15, which include Miss Arizona International 2005, second runner up Miss International, Physical Fitness Winner Miss International 2005, second runner up Miss Arizona USA 2007, Top 10 Miss Arizona USA 2006, Miss Metropolitan 2006, Top 10 Miss Arizona America, Miss Arizona American Teen 2001, second runner up Miss Arizona Teen International 2001, Top 10 Miss Arizona Teen USA 2001, and Physical Fitness Winner for Miss Arizona Teen USA 2001. | Episode 8, Runners-Up |
| Moya (51) & Jenileigh (25) | Daredevil Divas | (kept the same team name) | Moya has no experience. Jenileigh has competed since she was 9. She competed in the Cinderella Scholarship program for five years & won the Utah State title. Also competed for Miss Utah Teen USA and made the top five. Jenileigh competed in the Miss America program, where she won the titles of Miss Anaheim and Miss Orange County and went on to compete for Miss California. In 2006 she won the Miss Wyoming title and in 2007 competed in the Miss America 2007 pageant, where she made history as the pageant's first aerialist. Jenileigh was on the show Estate of Panic for its 5th episode. | Winners 1st |

== Contestant Progress ==
| Contestants | 1 | 2 | 3 | 4 | 5 | 6 | 7 | 8 |
|---|---|---|---|---|---|---|---|---|
| Moya & Jenileigh | SAFE | SAFE | SAFE | SAFE | WIN | SAFE | WIN | Winner |
| Mindy & Rachelle | SAFE | SAFE | BTM | SAFE | SAFE | WIN | SAFE | Runners-Up |
| Gina & Hollis | WIN | SAFE | SAFE | BTM | SAFE | WIN | WIN | Eliminated |
| Patty & Laura | SAFE | SAFE | SAFE | WIN | BTM | SAFE | BTM | Eliminated |
| Ada & Christian | SAFE | SAFE | WIN | SAFE | SAFE | BTM | ELIM | Guest |
| Angela & Tenia | SAFE | BTM | SAFE | SAFE | WIN | ELIM | Guest | |
| Brenda & Heather | BTM | SAFE | SAFE | WIN | ELIM | | Guest | |
| Jill & Nicole | SAFE | WIN | SAFE | ELIM | | | Guest | |
| Pamela & Felicia | SAFE | BTM | ELIM | | | | Guest | |
| Annette & Alana | SAFE | ELIM | | | | | Guest | |
| Andrea & Amanda | ELIM | | | | | | Guest | |

This team won Crowned: The Mother of All Pagenats.
This team were the runners-up of Crowned: The Mother of All Pagenats.
This team won the mini-challenge and had the highest score of the week.
This team had the highest score of the week.
This team won the mini-challenge.
This team had a low score and was up for elimination.
This team was eliminated.
This team was eliminated in an Ambush-desashing before the final interview.
This teams returned as guests for the episode.

== Nielsen ratings ==
| No. | Air Date | Timeslot | Rating | Share | 18-49 (Rating/Share) | Viewers (m) | Viewers/Week (m) | Rank | | |
| No. | Air Date | Timeslot | Rating | Share | 18-49 (Rating/Share) | Viewers (m) | Viewers/Week (m) | Night | Timeslot | Overall |
|---|---|---|---|---|---|---|---|---|---|---|
| 1 | December 12, 2007 | Wednesday 9/8c | 1.7 | 3 | 1.1/3 | 2.46 | 5.05 | 13 | 5 | 83/98 |
| 2 | December 19, 2007 | Wednesday 8/7c | 1.3 | 2 | 0.8/2 | 1.80 | 3.75 | 13 | 5 | TBA |
| 3 | December 26, 2007 | Wednesday 8/7c | 1.4 | 2 | 0.7/2 | 1.81 | 4.13 | 10 | 5 | 75/87 |
| 4 | January 2, 2008 | Wednesday 8/7c | 1.3 | 2 | 0.9/2 | 1.93 | 2.79 | 13 | 5 | 84/94 |
| 5 | January 9, 2008 | Wednesday 8/7c | 1.3 | 2 | 0.8/2 | 1.80 | 1.80 | 15 | 5 | 87/95 |
| 6 | January 16, 2008 | Wednesday 8/7c | 1.1 | 2 | 0.7/2 | 1.64 | 2.41 | 11 | 5 | 84/91 |
| 7 | January 23, 2008 | Wednesday 8/7c | 1.0 | 2 | 0.7/2 | 1.46 | 2.30 | 12 | 5 | TBA |
| 8 | January 30, 2008 | Wednesday 8/7c | 1.0 | 2 | 0.6/1 | 1.42 | 2.15 | 13 | 5 | TBA |
