= Fix Your Face =

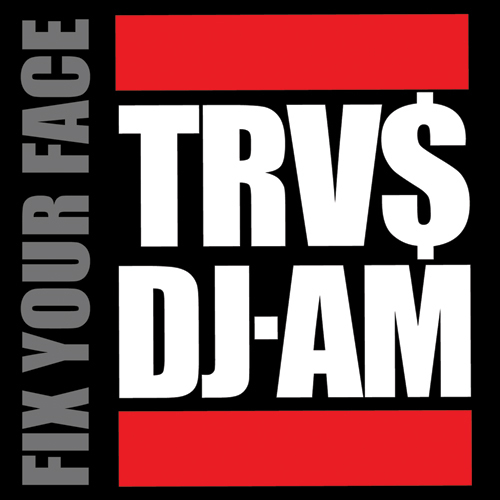

Mixtape by TRV$DJAM
- Released: August 27, 2008
- Genre: Drum and bass, turntablism
- Length: 43:21

Fix Your Face is the first DJ mix released by TRV$DJAM. It features Travis Barker on drums and DJ AM spinning records. It was released online on August 27, 2008.

== Track listing and samples ==
1. Fix Your Face 1
  - At 0:00 - Bill Conti - "Going the Distance"
  - At 1:08 - West Street Mob - "Ooh Baby"
  - At 1:52 - Johnny Cash - "Ring of Fire"
  - At 3:06 - Eve - "Tambourine"
2. Fix Your Face 2
  - At 0:00 - RUN-DMC - "Sucker MCs"
  - At 0:32 - Bobby Byrd - "I Know You Got Soul"
  - At 0:59 - Eric B. & Rakim - "I Know You Got Soul"
  - At 1:25 - Eric B. & Rakim - "Paid in Full (Seven Minutes Of Madness The Coldcut Remix)"
  - At 1:55 - James Brown - "Funky Drummer"
  - At 2:15 - Public Enemy - "Rebel Without a Pause"
3. Fix Your Face 3
  - At 0:00 - Chemical Brothers - "Block Rockin' Beats"
  - At 0:45 - Rage Against the Machine - "Killing in the Name (SebastiAn Remix)"
4. Fix Your Face 4
  - At 0:00 - Jay-Z - "Public Service Announcement"
  - At 0:42 - Beastie Boys - "So What'cha Want"
  - At 1:36 - Eazy-E - "Boyz-n-the-Hood (remix)"
5. Fix Your Face 5
  - At 0:00 - Red Hot Chili Peppers - "Can't Stop"
  - At 1:10 - Notorious B.I.G. - "Juicy"
6. Fix Your Face 6
  - At 0:00 - Rah Digga - "Do The Ladies Run This?"
  - At 0:20 - Michael Jackson - "Rock with You"
  - At 1:30 - Estelle - "American Boy" ft. Kanye West
7. Fix Your Face 7
  - At 0:00 - Daft Punk - "Da Funk"
  - At 0:49 - Timbaland - "The Way I Are"
8. Fix Your Face 8
  - At 0:05 - Timbaland - "The Way I Are"
  - At 0:33 - Jay-Z - "Big Pimpin'"
  - At 1:14 - Kid Cudi - "Day 'n' Nite"
9. Fix Your Face 9
  - At 0:00 - Three 6 Mafia - "Stay Fly"
  - At 0:19 - Lil' Wayne - Lollipop (0:55 - Chordettes - Lollipop)
  - At 1:08 - Lil' Wayne - "Lollipop (Remix)" ft. Kanye West
  - At 2:27 - Lil' Wayne - "A Milli"
10. Fix Your Face 10
  - At 0:25 - Led Zeppelin - "Fool in the Rain"
11. Fix Your Face 11
  - At 0:00 - DJ Deeon - "Gimme Head"
  - At 0:40 - DJ Assault - "Hoe Don't Cry"
  - At 1:03 - DJ Assault - "Ass and Titties"
12. Fix Your Face 12
  - At 0:00 - Damian Marley - "Welcome to Jamrock"
  - At 1:35 - Prince - "Darling Nikki"
  - At 2:05 - The Police - "So Lonely"
13. Fix Your Face 13
  - At 0:00 - Outkast - "B.O.B"
  - At 1:32 - The Outfield - "Your Love"
14. Fix Your Face 14
  - At 0:00 - M.I.A. - "Bucky Done Gun"
  - At 0:27 - Bill Conti - "Gonna Fly Now"
  - At 0:32 - Wild Motherfuckers - "Fuck It Up"
  - At 1:25 - Phil Collins - "In The Air Tonight"
15. Fix Your Face 15
  - At 0:05 - Joan Jett & the Blackhearts - "I Love Rock 'n' Roll"
  - At 0:19 - The Notorious B.I.G. - "Hypnotize"
  - At 1:21 - War - "Low Rider"
  - At 1:30 - Beastie Boys - "Slow Ride"
  - At 2:05 - Dramarama - "Anything, Anything (I'll Give You)"
