= Travis Barker =

American drummer (born 1975)

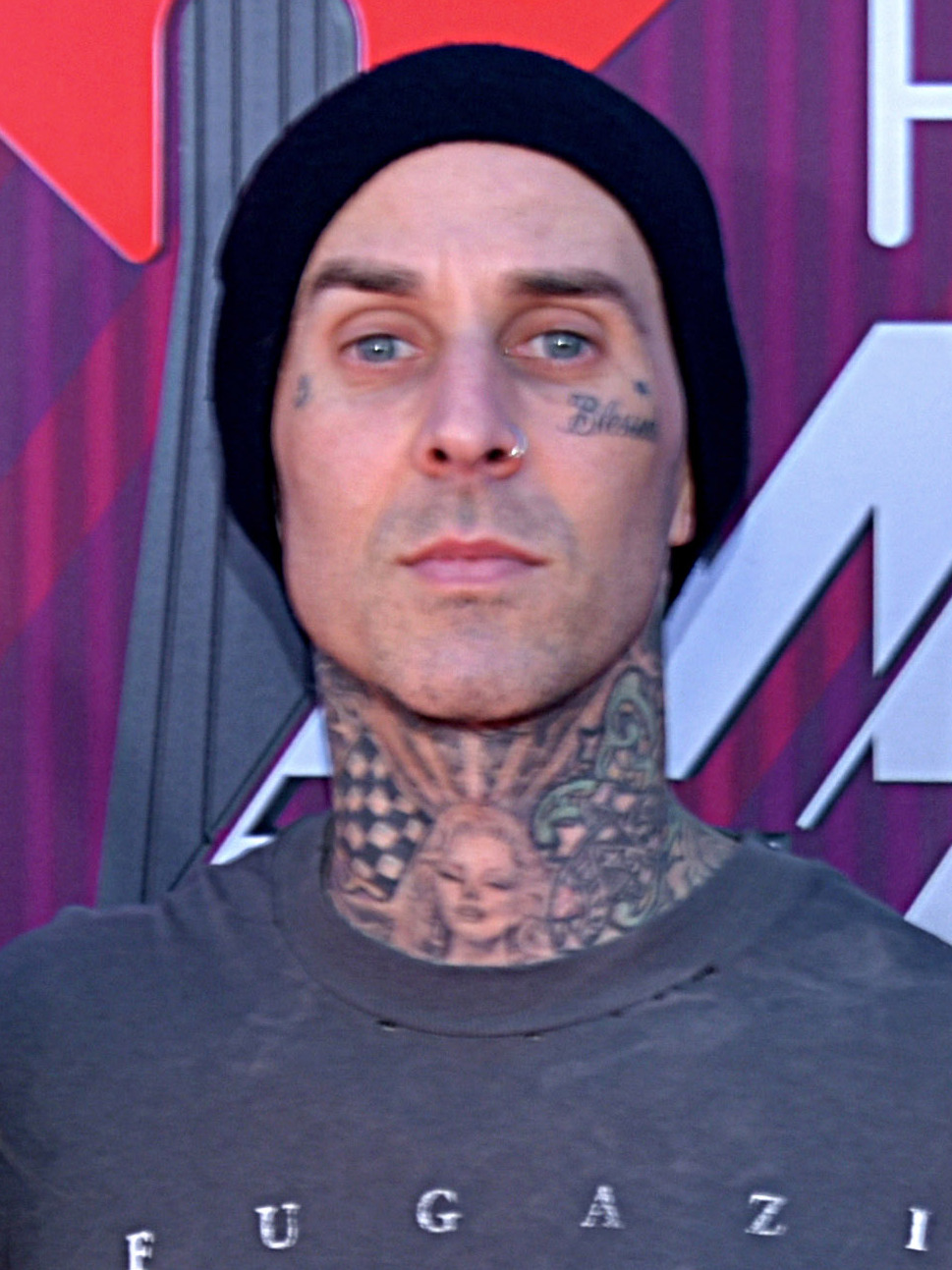
- Barker at the 2019 iHeartRadio Music Awards
- Born: Travis Landon Barker; November 14, 1975 (age 51); Fontana, California, U.S.
- Other names: The Baron von Tito; Bones; Clarence
- Occupations: Musician; songwriter; record producer
- Years active: 1993–present
- Television: Meet the Barkers
- Spouses: Melissa Kennedy (m. 2001; div. 2002) Shanna Moakler (m. 2004; div. 2008) Kourtney Kardashian (m. 2022)
- Children: 4, including Landon
- Awards: Full list
- Musical career
- Genres: Pop-punk; punk rock; skate punk; alternative rock; hip-hop
- Instruments: Drums; percussion
- Labels: DGC; Interscope; LaSalle; Atlantic; Geffen; Hellcat; MCA; Golden Voice; DTA; Goliath Artists
- Member of: Blink-182; Transplants
- Formerly of: The Aquabats; Box Car Racer; +44; Expensive Taste; TRV$DJAM; Antemasque
- Website: travisbarker.com

Travis Landon Barker (born November 14, 1975) is an American musician, songwriter, and music producer who is the drummer for the rock band Blink-182. He has collaborated with hip-hop artists, is a member of the rap rock group Transplants, co-founded the rock band +44, and has also joined Box Car Racer, Antemasque and Goldfinger. Barker was a frequent collaborator with the late DJ AM, with whom he formed the duo TRV$DJAM. Due to his fame, Rolling Stone referred to him as "punk's first superstar drummer", as well as one of the 100 greatest drummers of all time.

Born in Fontana, California, Barker began drumming at an early age. He began playing for the Aquabats in 1996, but left to join Blink-182 in 1998, which encountered mainstream success with Enema of the State (1999). Barker established himself as a versatile drummer, producing and making guest appearances in music projects of numerous music genres including hip hop, alternative rock, pop, and country. He also starred in an MTV reality series named Meet the Barkers. He survived a plane crash in 2008, and after he recovered he released his debut solo album, Give the Drummer Some, in 2011. He has continued to work with rappers, releasing extended plays with Yelawolf, Asher Roth, and Nottz, as well as with Blink-182 and the Transplants.

Aside from drumming, he founded the clothing company Famous Stars and Straps in 1999, and the record labels LaSalle Records in 2004 and DTA Records in 2019. Companies such as DC Shoes and Zildjian cymbals have co-designed products in his name. He released a memoir, Can I Say: Living Large, Cheating Death, and Drums, Drums, Drums, in 2015. Barker is also a vegan and has invested in the Los Angeles vegan restaurant Crossroads Kitchen.

== Early life and education ==
Barker was born in Fontana, California, on November 14, 1975, When Barker was four, his mother gave him his first drum kit, which was the only one he would have until he was 15. Barker began taking drum lessons at age five with a drummer named Michael Mai, who would expose young Barker to many different playing styles. At this time, he also began taking trumpet lessons. In junior high, Barker learned to play the piano and briefly tried singing, joining the madrigals men and women's choir. In addition, Barker had non-musical aspirations; he also was interested in becoming a professional surfer and skateboarder. However, Barker states that "I always migrated back to drums, though. That was the one direction that kind of felt like I was connected to and I could kind of understand. I could express myself better through my drums than I could anything else."

Barker has described himself as a stoner during his tenure at Fontana High School. His mother, who had been diagnosed with Sjögren syndrome three months earlier, died the day before he started high school. She told him to keep playing music and to follow his dreams. At Fontana High School, Barker played the drum set in the jazz ensemble and snare drum in the marching band. He gained a lot of experience performing at regional competitions and festivals. Barker employed a variety of styles including military and jazz rhythms, but was attracted to the driving rhythms of hip-hop and punk rock.

== Career ==
=== Musical beginnings (1993–1998) ===
After graduating from Fontana High School, Barker worked as a trash man in Laguna Beach and played with the punk rock band Snot and Feeble, a Fontana-based band where he met Chad Larson. Larson went on to join the ska punk group the Aquabats in 1994. After local shows and demo tapes, the band recruited Barker through Larson's connection. Barker, who was "sleeping on [his] friend's couch" and still working as a trash man, only intended to fill in for a few days but ended up joining the band. The group then went into the studio with veteran producer Jim Goodwin to record The Fury of the Aquabats! Barker's speed and accuracy meant that once his parts were recorded, he was free to head off and rehearse (and sit in with other bands). He had picked up a nickname with the Aquabats—Baron Von Tito—the reasons for which are lost to history as none of the members recall why.

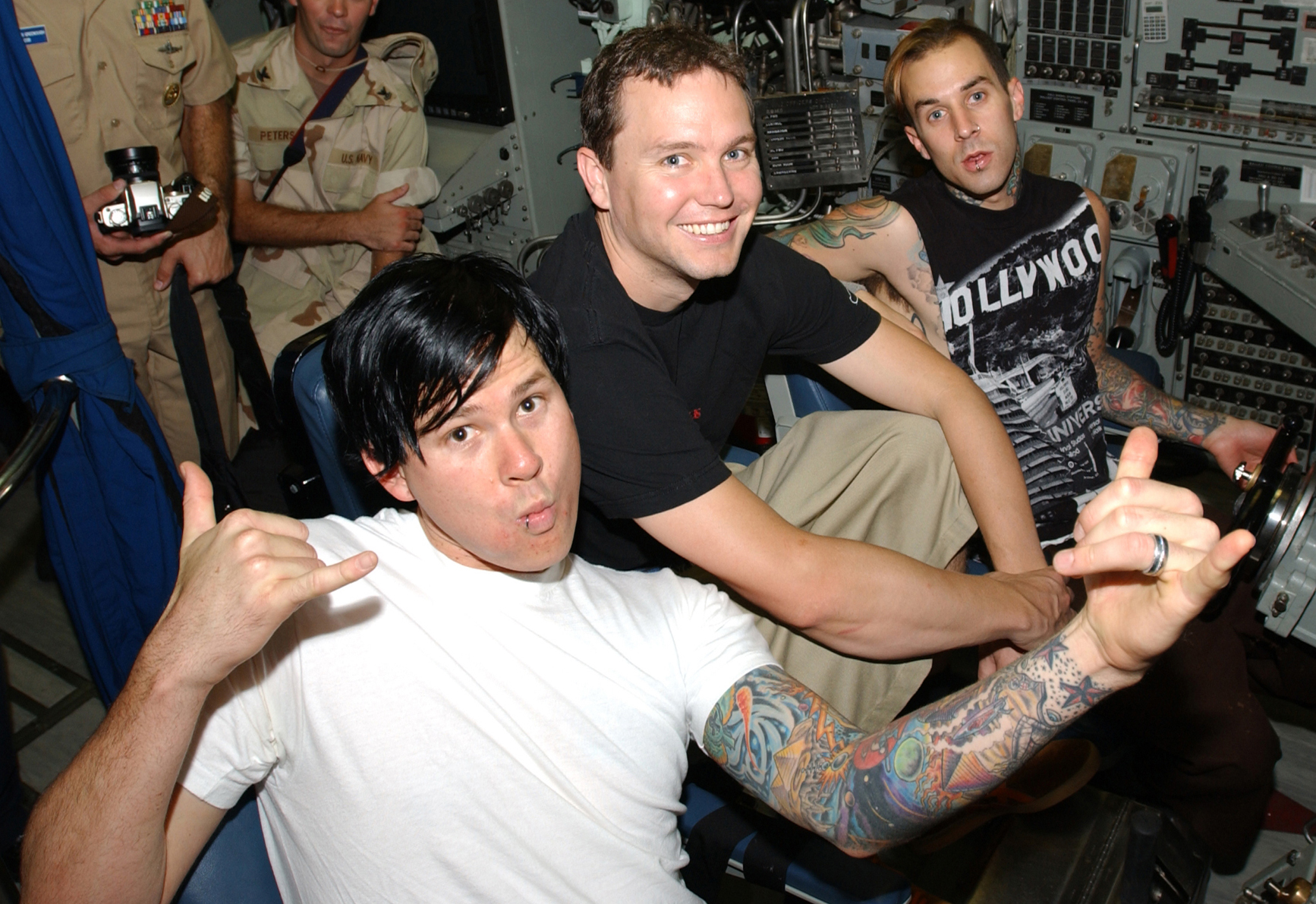
Barker (top right) joined Blink-182 in 1998.

After the October 1997 release of The Fury of the Aquabats!, the group toured nationwide with San Diego–based Blink-182, who had recently completed their second album Dude Ranch. The trio's drummer, Scott Raynor, announced to his fellow members that he would depart following the SnoCore Tour in February 1998. The ensemble enlisted Barker to fill in for Raynor. Barker, who did not have time to prepare or practice with the duo, learned the drum tracks for the 20-song setlist in only 45 minutes before the first show and performed them flawlessly thereafter. Raynor returned that May, but arguments only grew worse. Raynor was fired by DeLonge and Hoppus, ostensibly over a drinking problem, and the band recruited Barker once more. "I remember Travis rehearsing backstage for an hour or two, then playing with them during sound-check", recalled Aquabats member Adam Deibert. "A few of us were standing by the stage and I vividly remember the feeling of this is the new Blink. We should have looked for a new drummer right then because it was so obvious what band he belonged in." The addition of Barker inspired DeLonge and Hoppus to "play better" and keep up with their new member, whom DeLonge called "perfect". Barker continued playing with Blink-182 throughout 1998 and stepped in to play with the Vandals, where he filled in for Josh Freese as the year closed.

=== Mainstream success (1999–2004) ===
Barker's first album with Blink—Enema of the State—was released in June 1999 and catapulted the trio to stardom, becoming the biggest pop punk band of the era. Three singles were released from the record—"What's My Age Again?", "All the Small Things", and "Adam's Song"—that crossed over into Top 40 radio format and experienced major commercial success. "All the Small Things" became a number-one hit on the Modern Rock Tracks chart, but also became a crossover hit and peaked at number 6 on the Billboard Hot 100 chart. Its video parodied boy bands and pop music videos and won a Moon Man for Best Group Video at the 2000 MTV Video Music Awards. The album has sold over 15 million copies worldwide and had a considerable effect on pop punk music.

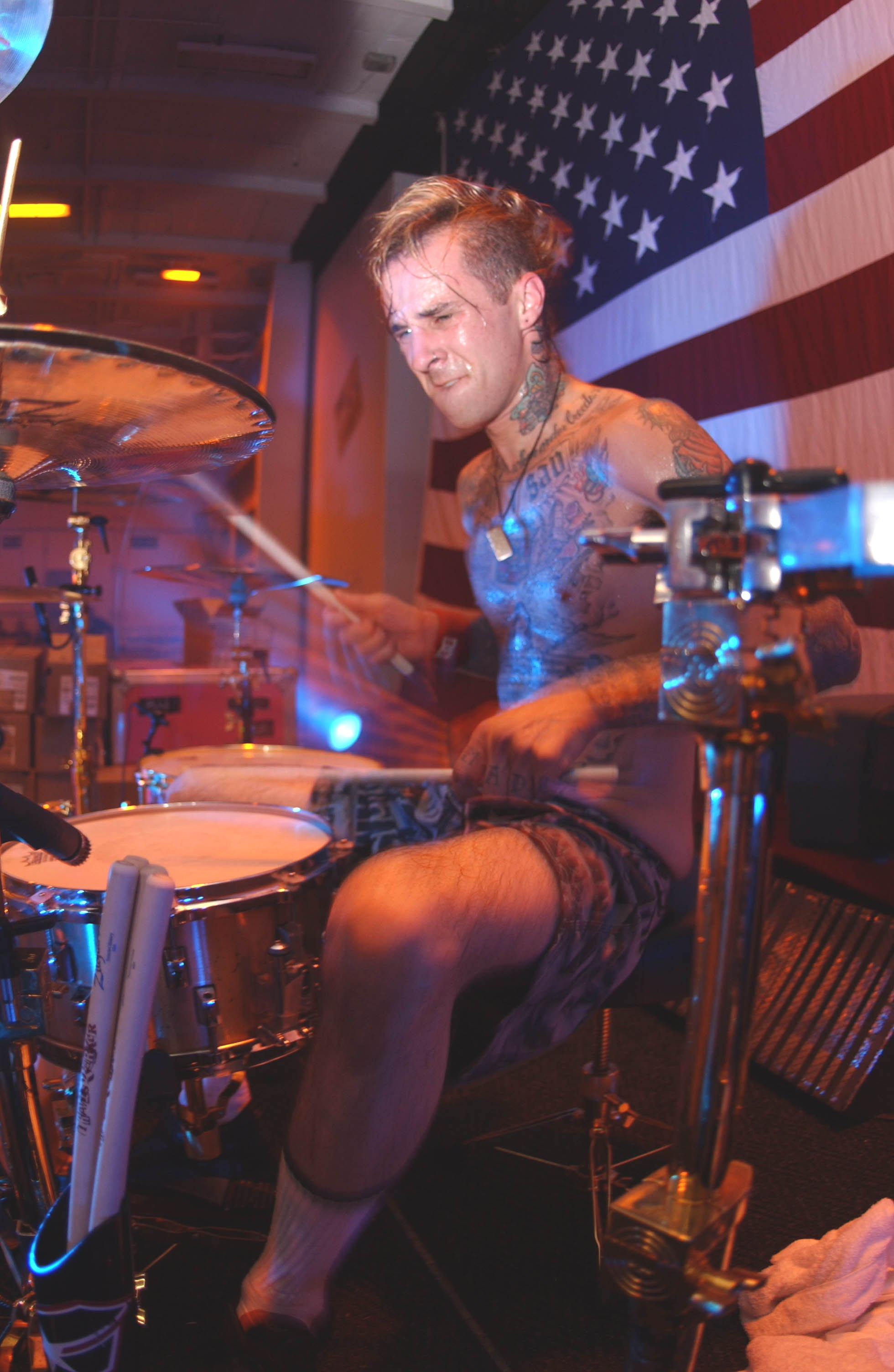
Barker performing in 2003

The band's success did great things for Barker. "Four years ago, I couldn't afford to feed myself," he said in an interview at the time. "But now I can buy art, work on old Cadillacs, and live in comfort. I can finally buy a dog and afford to feed him." He began dating Melissa Kennedy and purchased a rehearsal studio. Barker branched out into retail at this time, opening a store in Riverside called Famous Stars and Straps. The storefront was shut down by the city, but FSAS products began to be carried by other retailers and via the Internet. Barker also began offering drum lessons and added Guitar Center drum clinics to his list of activities. The band began its first arena tour in the fall of 1999, but Barker missed much of the 2000 Mark, Tom and Travis Show tour after he broke his finger.

Blink-182's next effort, Take Off Your Pants and Jacket (2001), was greeted with immediate success, debuting at number one on the Billboard 200 and going triple platinum within three weeks (the record eventually sold in excess of 14 million copies worldwide).

In 2001, Barker married Melissa Kennedy, but the two divorced in August 2002 after nine months of marriage. Following a cancelled European tour, DeLonge went back to San Diego to record an album he deemed an experiment in ideas he felt weren't suited to Blink-182. DeLonge, not wanting to pay for a studio drummer, simply asked Barker to step in and perform on the record, called Box Car Racer. The experiment became a full-time band and toured in 2002, which led to strained relations between DeLonge and Hoppus.

Word had got around that not only was Travis Barker an amazing drummer, [but that] he was also an amazing studio drummer which was a skill that a lot of drummers don't necessarily share. Travis had this reputation of being a guy who could sit down with a click track and no music and have the arrangement in his head and he could lay down the drum tracks in five, ten minutes for a song and then the band could play on top to him as if he was a drum machine.

— Dave Carlock

Through a connection with Jerry Finn, Rancid vocalist Tim Armstrong contacted Barker in the summer of 2002 to record tracks for a rap/rock collaboration called the Transplants. For his role on the Transplants record, Rolling Stone called Barker "punk rock's first superstar drummer". He also began appearing in music videos, including Puff Daddy's "Bad Boy for Life", as well as adding to his collection of vintage Cadillacs. Blink-182 released their fifth, untitled album in 2003, which marked a more mature direction. Shortly before the album's completion, Barker's girlfriend, ex-Miss USA Shanna Moakler, gave birth to their son, Landon Asher, in October 2003.

The Kinison, who supported Blink-182 on their tour dates, impressed Barker and were the first group signed to LaSalle Records, a record label Barker officially set up in 2004. LaSalle was named after Barker's favorite Cadillac, and the label was designed to branch out to find all types of music, be it country or hip-hop. Barker met once a week with designers at Famous Stars and Straps to oversee designs for shoes and in his spare time picked up boxing. He injured his foot at a Melbourne, Australia show in 2004 but performed the next night using his left foot for the kick-drum; he was in so much pain afterward that the tour had to be canceled. Barker's doctor informed him that not only did he break his foot, but he tore tendons and ligaments—described by Hoppus as "the type of injury that people get in motorcycle accidents." In the meantime, Barker purchased a Wahoo's Fish Taco franchise in Norco, California, and began work on a new Transplants record. The year for Blink-182 rounded off with a European tour that was soured by division in the band. In February 2005, the band issued a press statement announcing their "indefinite hiatus".

=== Reality television star and collaborations (2005–2008) ===
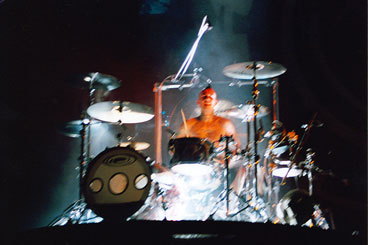
Barker on stage in 2004

After a Nightmare Before Christmas-inspired wedding in October 2004, Barker starred in the MTV reality series Meet the Barkers with wife Shanna Moakler. The series followed Barker and his new family through his daily life, including Blink-182's final tour and the new Transplants album. The new Transplants album, Haunted Cities (2005), was completed in the aftermath of the Blink-182 "hiatus" and released in mid-2005. Meanwhile, Hoppus and Barker continued recording music together and began working on electronic demos, which they called +44. Barker began another new project in 2005 called Expensive Taste, featuring Paul Wall and Skinhead Rob—the project would be more traditionally hip-hop. Barker also turned his direction to producing, working with artists such as Bun B and T.I. The +44 project came to a turning point when Hoppus and Barker purchased their own studio in October 2005, named Opra Music. When Your Heart Stops Beating, the debut of +44, was greeted by less-than-stellar reviews and little commercial success.

Barker filed for divorce from Moakler that August; both used their MySpace blogs to comment on the situation. Their breakup and the drama surrounding it made them tabloid favorites. After he and Moakler split up in 2006, he was frequently spotted at nightclubs—and photographed necking with Paris Hilton. According to Barker, he was trying to blot out the guilt of giving his children a broken home, and consumed "excessive amounts" of prescription painkillers, marijuana and alcohol. The painkiller usage eventually developed into a full-fledged addiction over 2007. Barker broke his arm during a video shoot for +44, but continued to tour performing using one arm. In early 2007, Barker began to work on hip-hop remixes and production techniques for many artists, preparing some loops and beats for Juelz Santana and looking to open two new boutiques, one in Los Angeles named Fast Life and one in Venice Beach by the name of Rogue Status. He kept busy drumming for Idiot Pilot ("Elephant") and the Federation ("Black Roses"), as well as creating well-received remixes of Rihanna's "Umbrella" and "Crank That (Soulja Boy)". After a stint on the Honda Civic Tour with Fall Out Boy and Cobra Starship, +44 began work on a second studio album that October.

Barker continued releasing hip-hop remixes in 2008; a well-received remix of Flo Rida's "Low" followed the "Crank That" rendition. The videos of Barker playing the revamped tracks grew heavily in popularity on YouTube. Barker hoped to collate his growing arsenal of remixes with a bunch of new tracks on which he was working. It began to germinate into the idea of making a solo album, producing it all himself. As 2008 wore on, it became evident that the project would supersede +44 for the immediate future, though the band would return, by all accounts, once everything was in place for the solo record. Guests who recorded with Barker included Young Dro, E-40, Willie Nelson, and Damian Marley. He began performing with DJ AM (Adam Goldstein) in June 2008 in a collaboration called TRV$DJAM. Essentially, DJ AM would mix a set of classic songs (which ranged from classic rock to dance) live with two turntables, then Barker would "enhance AM's groove" with live drums. The duo performed at the MTV Video Music Awards on September 7. "Our little duo of drummer and DJ [had] reached heights we never thought were possible," said Barker in a 2011 interview.

In 2008, Barker and Goldstein were in a plane crash that killed the other four people on board and left them both in critical condition.

=== Solo album and reunions (Since 2009) ===
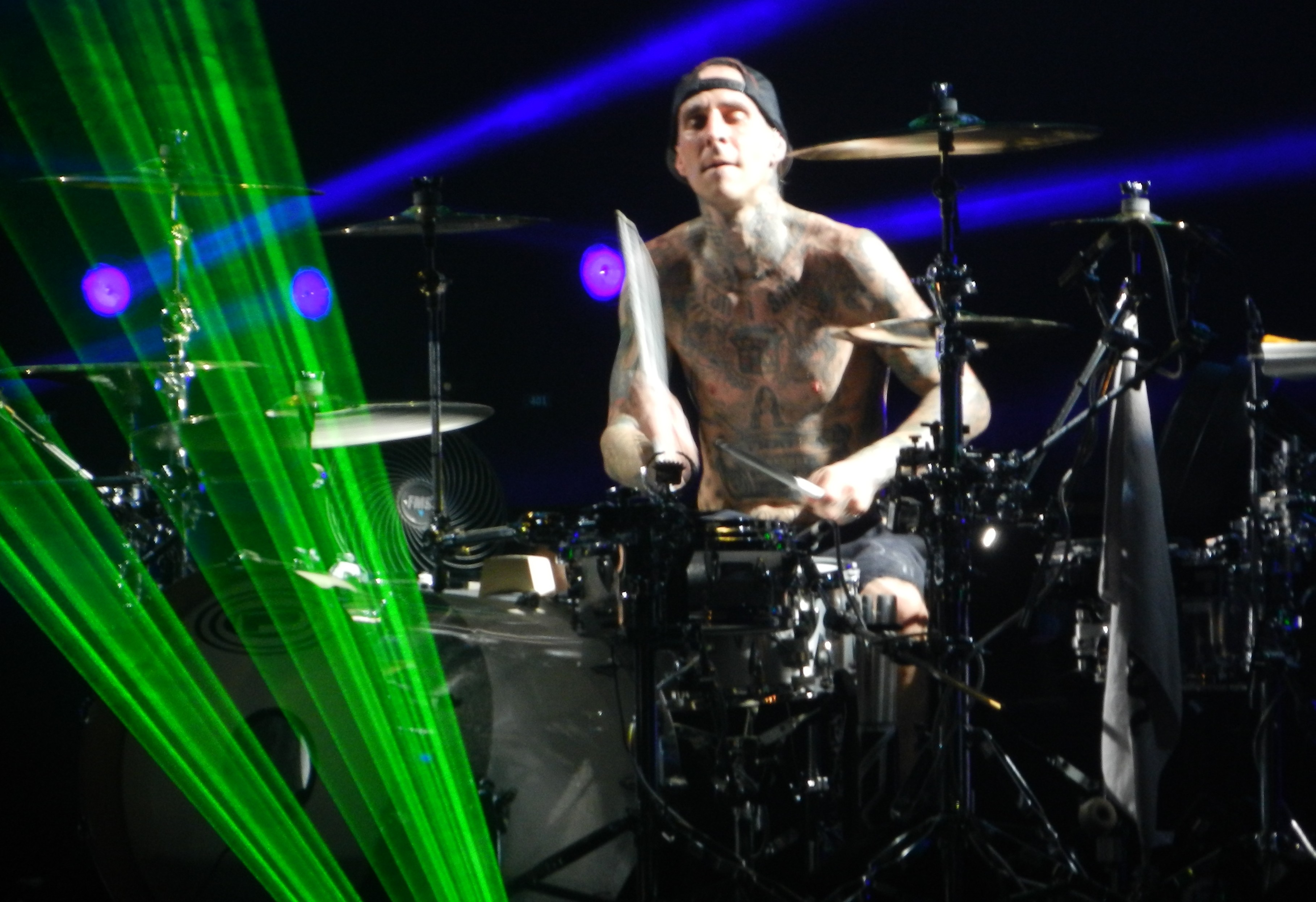
Barker drumming for Blink-182 in 2011

Barker's accident led to a Blink-182 reunion, with the group announcing their return at the February 2009 Grammy Awards. Barker continued to produce remixes throughout 2009, including a remix of "3 a.m." by Eminem; he also collaborated with Guns N' Roses guitarist Slash. In the midst of the band's reunion tour in August 2009, DJ AM was found dead by a friend in his New York apartment. Though Goldstein had been prescribed medication for pain following the crash, the medical examiner reported that he died from "acute intoxication" listing several prescription drugs and cocaine.

The plane crash led Barker to make some lifestyle changes; he began running and swimming each day, and went vegan since leaving the hospital, although he had already been vegetarian for 17 years. He has also overcome a painkiller addiction he had for years prior to the plane crash. "I didn't even take any pain medication after I got out of the hospital. They told me I'd be on some of the medicine for the rest of my life, but I got off all of them," said Barker. "They made me a completely different person." Barker didn't fly again until 2021, traveling by himself on his bus—and taking a boat when touring in Europe.

After more than two years of setbacks and delays, Barker finally released his long-in-the-works solo debut, Give the Drummer Some, in March 2011. The record features collaborations with artists from Lil Wayne to Slipknot's Corey Taylor. Neighborhoods, Blink's sixth studio album, was released in September 2011 and peaked at number two on the Billboard 200. Barker continued his collaborations, working with Chester French, LL Cool J, Cypress Hill and producing an entire EP of collaboration, Psycho White, with rapper Yelawolf. Barker was unable to attend Blink-182's Australian tour in 2013; Brooks Wackerman filled in.

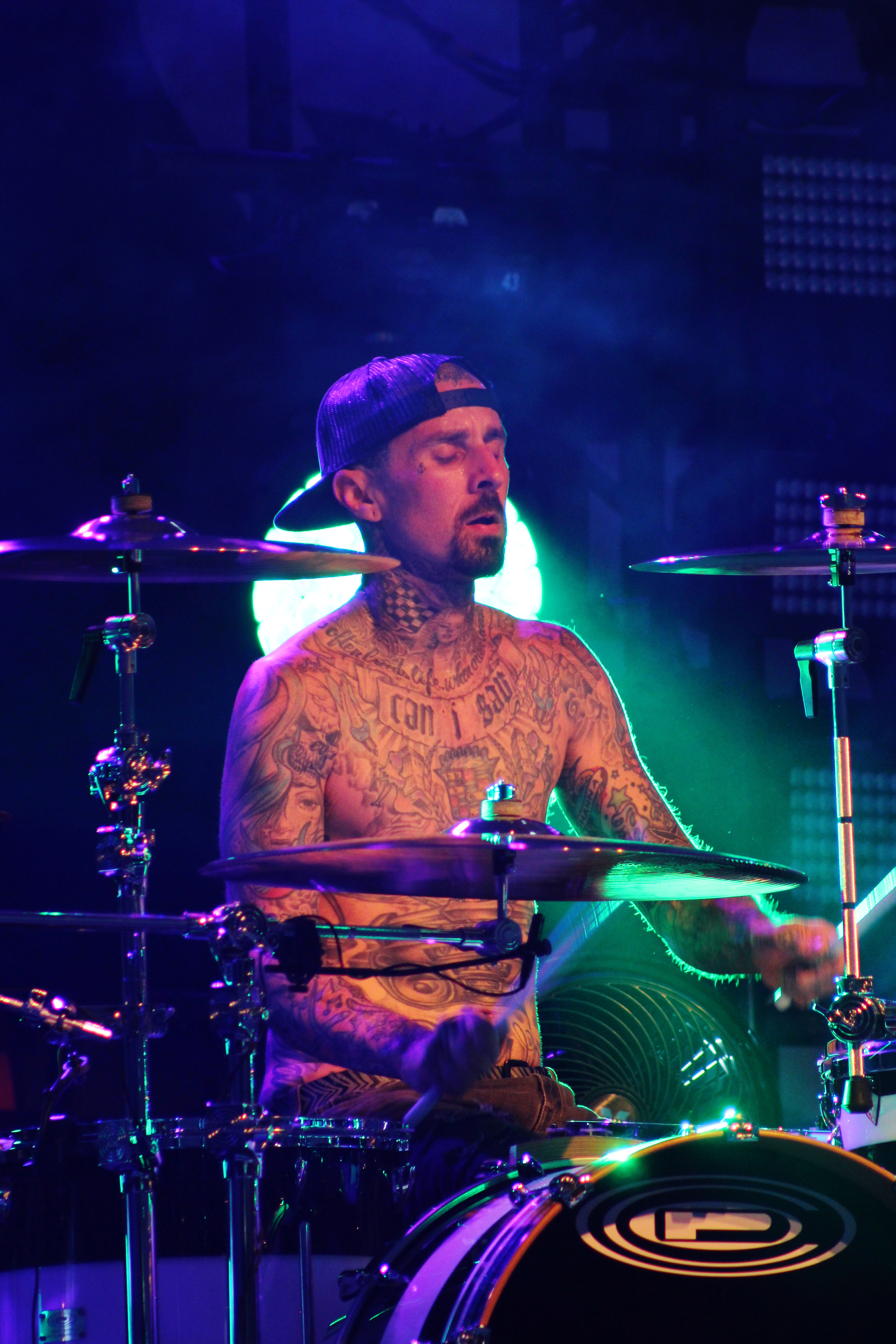
Barker performing in 2016

On July 1, 2016, Blink released their seventh studio album California to critical and commercial success. To complete the project, Blink members Hoppus and Barker were forced to replace Blink co-founder Tom DeLonge with vocalist/guitarist Matt Skiba of Alkaline Trio. Barker has joined Hoppus in citing DeLonge as the principal cause of the replacement. Citing DeLonge's alleged unwillingness to commit to working on new Blink projects, Barker revealed.

"We always covered up for [DeLonge] before. It was always, 'We're going to record an album,' then 'Tom refuses to get into the studio without a record deal.' So everyone does hella amounts of work to get a record deal and now Tom isn't part of Blink-182. It's hard to cover for someone who's disrespectful and ungrateful… Everyone should know what the story is with him and it's been years with it."

He is currently producing his second solo album. Barker has written a memoir entitled Can I Say: Living Large, Cheating Death, and Drums, Drums, Drums, which was released on October 20, 2015. He appeared in the 2016 Grammy-nominated documentary film about American DJ and producer Steve Aoki, titled I'll Sleep When I'm Dead.

In 2018, Travis Barker appeared on the trap-metal musician Ghostemane's track, "D(r)ead". He also features on XXXTentacion's posthumous album "Skins", playing drums on the track "One Minute" featuring Kanye West. In 2018 Travis Barker also joined The Aquabats for a 20th anniversary show celebrating their second album The Fury of the Aquabats at the Fonda Theater in Los Angeles, California.

In 2019, Barker teamed up with popular New Orleans alternative hip hop duo $uicideboy$ to announce Live Fast Die Whenever, a collaborative EP. Prior to the project's release, the singles "nothingleftnothingleft" (a rapid-fire hardcore punk song) and "Aliens Are Ghosts" (which samples music critic Anthony Fantano's review of $uicideboy$' debut album) were released. The EP was released on May 24. Along with the lead singles, the EP also included the songs "Killing 2 Birds with 22 Stones", "Sour Grapes", "Don't Trust Anyone!" (stylized in all caps), and "Individuality Was So Last Year". Several tracks on the EP also featured James Shaffer of Korn on guitar. On July 12, 2019, Travis remixed Lil Peep & XXXTentacion's posthumous track "Falling Down".

On April 24, 2020, during the COVID-19 pandemic, Barker was featured as the drummer during Post Malone's well-received Nirvana tribute show and fundraiser for the WHO COVID-19 Solidarity Response Fund.

In May 2020, Barker signed American musician and TikTok personality Jxdn to his label DTA Records, making Jxdn the first artist on the label.

In September 2020, Barker was on a collaboration project with Machine Gun Kelly on Kelly's album Tickets to My Downfall. He was also heavily featured in the movie adaptation of this album, Downfalls High. Barker played on the Willow Smith pop-punk track "Transparent Soul", released April 27, 2021.

In February 2021, he launched a line of cannabinoid-infused products called Barker Wellness. The next month, on March 15, 2021, Barker was a featured artist in the Atreyu song "Warrior" on the album "Baptize".

In July 2021, Barker signed an exclusive worldwide publishing administration deal with Warner Chappell Music.

In November 2021, Barker signed former BMG artist Avril Lavigne to DTA Records, with releases due to be handled by Warner Music Group's Elektra Records.

In 2022, Travis Barker executive produced Machine Gun Kelly's eighth studio album. Barker and Kelly announced the album title, Born with Horns, by getting matching tattoos of the album title on their arms. Kelly later changed the album title to Mainstream Sellout.

In June 2023, Travis Barker met with Alex Etheridge, a 13-year-old Phoenix musician suffering from bone cancer who was a particular fan of Barker's drumming. Alex met Barker backstage at Blink-182's June 14, 2023, concert in Phoenix, and Alex and his family sat in the front row for the concert later. The two spent more than an hour together, talking and playing drums, including an introduction to Barker's wife Kourtney Kardashian via FaceTime. The meeting was set up by Australian social-media influencer Samuel Weidenhofer, who traveled from Melbourne to help arrange it. Weidenhofer recorded the meeting and released it later as a TikTok video, which has received more than 17 million views as of July 2023. Alex died on July 19, 2023.

In 2026, Barker starred in a documentary film, Travis Barker: Louder Than Fear about his early life and career, addiction, plane crash, and relationship with Kourtney Kardashian.

== Influences and favorite drummers ==
Barker told CBS Local that his first ever hero was Animal from The Muppets, crediting the character as his inspiration to pursue drumming; Barker eventually played along with Animal and Dr. Teeth and the Electric Mayhem on a 2012 episode of Jimmy Kimmel Live!, and appeared alongside Animal in the pre-show video for Rock 'n' Roller Coaster Starring the Muppets at Disney's Hollywood Studios. He also cites John Bonham of Led Zeppelin, Alex Van Halen of Van Halen, Tommy Lee of Mötley Crüe, and Danny Carey of Tool as his favorite drummers. In a 2016 Q&A with Vevo, Barker cited Buddy Rich as the greatest drummer of all time. He also stated that Van Halen's "Jump" was the first song he learned on the drums. In 2026, Barker inducted Phil Collins into the Rock and Roll Hall of Fame, describing him as "The GOAT". In the induction speech, he said: “I remember watching him play drums in his music videos on MTV and VH1, and my mom would always tell me, ‘That’s the guy. That’s the drummer you need to watch — look at him.’ And she was right. I wanted to be just like him.” Barker performed "In the Air Tonight" at the ceremony alongside Cynthia Erivo, and described it as "the most badass drum fill of all time".

== Personal life ==
=== Plane crash (2008) ===
I opened a door, and my hands caught fire. I ran to get out of the plane, but I fell through a wing. I immediately soaked up with jet fuel and caught fire. And then I was on fire, running like hell. I was running for my family: I didn't care about anything except being with my dad, my sister, Shanna, my three kids. I'm completely naked, holding my genitals—everything else is on fire—and I'm running, trying to put myself out.

— Travis Barker

On September 19, 2008, TRV$DJAM performed at a free T-Mobile event in Five Points with Jane's Addiction singer Perry Farrell and Gavin DeGraw in Columbia, South Carolina. The trip was a special occasion: "We all thought it was kind of a treat—we were on a private plane," Barker said. Barker had invited his ex-wife Moakler, but she declined, saying she had a weird feeling about leaving their children. With a vacant seat, Barker invited his security guard Che Still, figuring he would be good company and would enjoy the trip. Barker was always afraid to fly; in his teenage years, he was "sure" he would die in a plane crash. When Blink-182 were putting together artwork for Take Off Your Pants and Jacket in 2001, they created a "Zoso-like" icon for each band member: a jacket, a pair of pants, and an airplane. "Please don't give me the plane—I have a really fucked-up fear of flying," Barker begged, who ended up with the plane anyway.

Just before midnight, the plane, headed for Van Nuys, California, was heading down the runway when the occupants heard a loud bang. According to the Federal Aviation Administration, the plane was departing from the airport when air traffic controllers saw sparks emanating from the plane. The pilots told the control tower that a tire had blown out and they would be aborting the take-off. The plane hurtled through the airport's fence, across a highway and crashed into an embankment. "When everything stopped, I tried to get everyone I could," Barker remembered. Barker and Adam "DJ AM" Goldstein escaped the plane and ran in circles on the highway. Hearing others yell, "Stop, drop and roll," Barker dropped to the ground and Goldstein helped him put out the fire on his feet. Barker said, "I was lying next to AM [Goldstein] as the plane was exploding, and I was screaming, 'Are we alive?'" Barker and Goldstein were transported to the Joseph M. Still Burn Center in Augusta, Georgia, where they were both listed in critical condition. They were the only survivors of the crash; personal assistant Chris Baker and Che Still, along with the two pilots, died in the crash. Less than a year later, Goldstein died from an overdose.

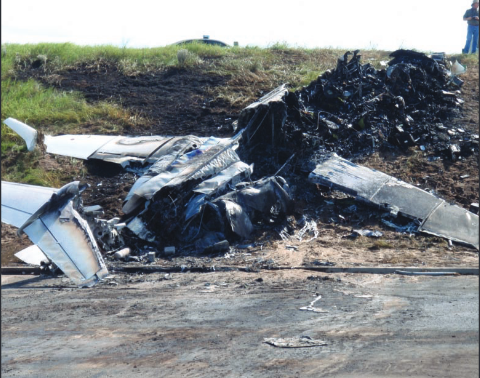
The remains of the plane crash

Barker spent more than 11 weeks in hospitals and burn centers. He had 16 surgeries: blood transfusions that lasted 4–8 hours and numerous skin grafts. "There were times when they were talking about amputating my foot because I didn't have enough skin on my body for my grafts," he said. Barker also developed post-traumatic stress disorder, made worse by the intense guilt he felt knowing Still was not supposed to be on the plane. During his time in the hospital, Barker was in so much pain that he was calling friends, offering them $1 million to help him end his life.

He stopped his vegetarian diet and began eating meat to increase his protein intake and possibly speed up healing of his burns. Barker recovered from the incident, enabling him to return to the recording studio in November 2008. In his first television interview since the crash, he said to MTV, "I'm already playing my drums again, and I'm already back in the studio". He elaborated by stating that the return to the studio "was like riding a bike. It was really exciting to know I still have my chops. It still felt good... I still can make it around the kit. Everything felt right, so I'm thankful to be able to play." Barker sued the plane's owners, Goodyear Tire and Rubber Co., and an airplane maintenance company that month; the case was settled out of court in December 2009 and the terms of the settlement are confidential.

=== Relationships and family ===
Barker's first marriage, to Melissa Kennedy, lasted nine months until he filed for divorce in August 2002. He later married actress and Miss USA 1995 first runner-up titleholder, Shanna Moakler, on October 30, 2004. The couple had a The Nightmare Before Christmas goth-style ceremony held on the eve of Halloween. Barker and Moakler have two children together, a son, Landon Barker, born in 2003, and a daughter, Alabama, born in 2005. Barker also remains extremely close with his stepdaughter Atiana (Moakler's daughter with ex-fiancé, boxer Oscar De La Hoya), who appears regularly on The Kardashians where she is referred to as Barker's daughter. The family appeared in a reality television series, Meet the Barkers, which aired on MTV from 2005 to 2006.

On August 8, 2006, Barker filed for divorce from Moakler after nearly two years of marriage. The divorce was made public as each used their MySpace pages to air their feelings on the matter. Despite their pending divorce, reports surfaced in early 2007 that Barker and Moakler were "quietly trying to give it another go" as they were reportedly seen autographing a fan's book, with a heart around their names. In March 2007, Moakler told People magazine that she and Barker (still married) were back together, but denied that she was pregnant. This came after the couple were publicly affectionate at a surprise birthday Barker threw for his wife in Miami. People later reported that the couple had separated again; no reason was given for the split. Barker and Moakler were seen together at the 2007 MTV Video Music Awards kissing and holding hands. However, on February 11, 2008, the couple's divorce was finalized.

Barker and Moakler were together during a DJ set Barker was playing with DJ AM in Las Vegas on January 7, 2009. The couple attempted to rekindle their relationship in early 2009, but announced that they were no longer together on April 1, 2009.

On December 7, 2014, the police were called to Barker and Moakler's shared home in Los Angeles after the two were engaged in a verbal altercation. They made criminal threats to each other, leading to both Barker and Moakler getting arrested. No charges were filed against either party.

In late 2015, Barker briefly dated singer and actress Rita Ora. In June 2016, it was reported that Barker and Moakler were amicably co-parenting their two children.

There were rumors of Barker and Kourtney Kardashian dating by very late 2020, which were confirmed and the relationship made official in January 2021. During this relationship, he returned to air travel after avoiding airplanes for 13 years. In October 2021, the couple got engaged. They had an unofficial wedding on April 3, 2022, in Las Vegas, after the 64th Annual Grammy Awards. The couple officially married on May 15, 2022, in Santa Barbara, California, with a religious wedding ceremony in Portofino, Italy, on May 22, 2022. On November 4, 2023, it was announced that the couple's first child, a son they named Rocky Thirteen, had been born.

Barker was raised Catholic, believes in God, and prays regularly with his children.

== Film, television, and video games ==
Barker has appeared in numerous films and television shows, including his own reality show, Meet the Barkers, with his ex-wife Shanna Moakler, which debuted in 2005. Barker is in a brief scene with Blink-182 in the teen movie American Pie. In 2003, he appeared in an episode of MTV's Punk'd, a Candid Camera-esque television show, in which he took part in a set-up bareknuckle boxing match; he also appeared and spoke alongside Linkin Park vocalist Chester Bennington on MTV's Icon show honoring heavy metal band Metallica in May of that year.

In 2006, Barker starred in a Boost Mobile commercial, which was detailed in an episode of Meet the Barkers. He's also played a few guest starring roles such as a rapper on the popular crime drama, CSI: Crime Scene Investigation. In 2001, he appeared with Mark Hoppus and Tom DeLonge in the skit "Leave it to Blink-182", a parody of "Leave It to Beaver", on the late night TV show MADtv.

In a slight departure from his usual genres, he made an appearance on the 41st annual CMA Awards in 2006, performing a medley of songs by country icon Buck Owens with a group of artists including Dwight Yoakam, ZZ Top guitarist Billy Gibbons, and former Byrds bass player Chris Hillman.

Barker performed alongside Skylar Grey and Kid Ink at WrestleMania 31. He appears as a secret, playable character in Tony Hawk's Project 8, and in Guitar Hero World Tour.

=== Filmography ===
| Year | Title | Role | Notes |
|---|---|---|---|
| 1999 | American Pie | Garage band member | Miscredited; the film makers credited former Blink-182 drummer Scott Raynor by mistake |
| 1999 | The Urethra Chronicles | Blink-182 | |
| 1999 | Two Guys, a Girl, and a Pizza Place | Himself | |
| 2000 | Jailbait | Blink-182 | |
| 2001 | MADtv | Blink-182 | "Leave it to Blink-182" |
| 2001 | MTV Cribs | Himself | |
| 2002 | Riding in Vans with Boys | Blink-182 | |
| 2003 | Ride with Funkmaster Flex | Himself | |
| 2003 | The Urethra Chronicles II | Blink-182 | |
| 2003 | The Simpsons | Himself | "Barting Over" |
| 2005 | Give 'Em the Boot | Transplants | |
| 2005 | Meet the Barkers | Himself | 2005–2006 |
| 2006 | CSI: Crime Scene Investigation | Hi Def | "Poppin' Tags" |
| 2007 | Adventures in Hollyhood | Himself | |
| 2007 | MTV Cribs | Himself | Rick Thorne Episode |
| 2007 | Primer Impacto | Himself | |
| 2008 | Start the Machine | Himself | Appears in Blink 182 flashbacks. |
| 2009 | Rob Dyrdek's Fantasy Factory | Himself | Playing the drums, for Rob's new song |
| 2010 | The Hard Times of RJ Berger | Himself | |
| 2016 | The Eric Andre Show | Himself | "Tichina Arnold; Steve Schirripa" |
| 2019 | The Joe Rogan Experience | Himself | Episode #1239 |
| 2020 | Downfalls High | Narrator | |
| 2022 | The Kardashians | Guest role | |
| 2023 | Dave | Himself | Season 3, Episode 8 'Met Gala' |
| 2026 | Travis Barker: Louder Than Fear | Himself | |

== Discography ==
Solo

- Give the Drummer Some (2011)

with Blink-182

Main article: Blink-182 discography
- Enema of the State (1999)
- Take Off Your Pants and Jacket (2001)
- Blink-182 (2003)
- Neighborhoods (2011)
- California (2016)
- Nine (2019)
- One More Time... (2023)

with Transplants

Main article: Transplants discography
- Transplants (2002)
- Haunted Cities (2005)
- In a Warzone (2013)
- Take Cover (2017)

with +44

Main article: +44 discography
- When Your Heart Stops Beating (2006)

with TRV$DJAM

- Fix Your Face (DJ mix) (2008)
- Fix Your Face Vol. 2 (Coachella' 09) (DJ mix) (2009)

with the Aquabats

- The Fury of The Aquabats! (1997)
- The Fury of The Aquabats! Live At The Fonda! (2020)

with Box Car Racer

- Box Car Racer (2002)

with Expensive Taste

- DJ Skee Presents: Expensive Taste (2007)

with Goldfinger

- The Knife (2017)

== General references ==
- Hoppus, Anne (October 1, 2001). Blink-182: Tales from Beneath Your Mom. MTV Books/Pocket Books. ISBN 0-7434-2207-4.
- Shooman, Joe (June 24, 2010). Blink-182: The Bands, the Breakdown & the Return. Independent Music Press. ISBN 978-1-90619-110-8.

== Notes ==
- A. "Let's Go" was not released as a single; it charted due to digital downloads.
- B. "Let's Go" peaked outside of the US Billboard Hot 100 chart, therefore it is listed on the Bubbling Under Hot 100 chart, a chart monitoring the next top 25 singles beyond the top 100.
