= Shanna Moakler =

American actress (born 1975)

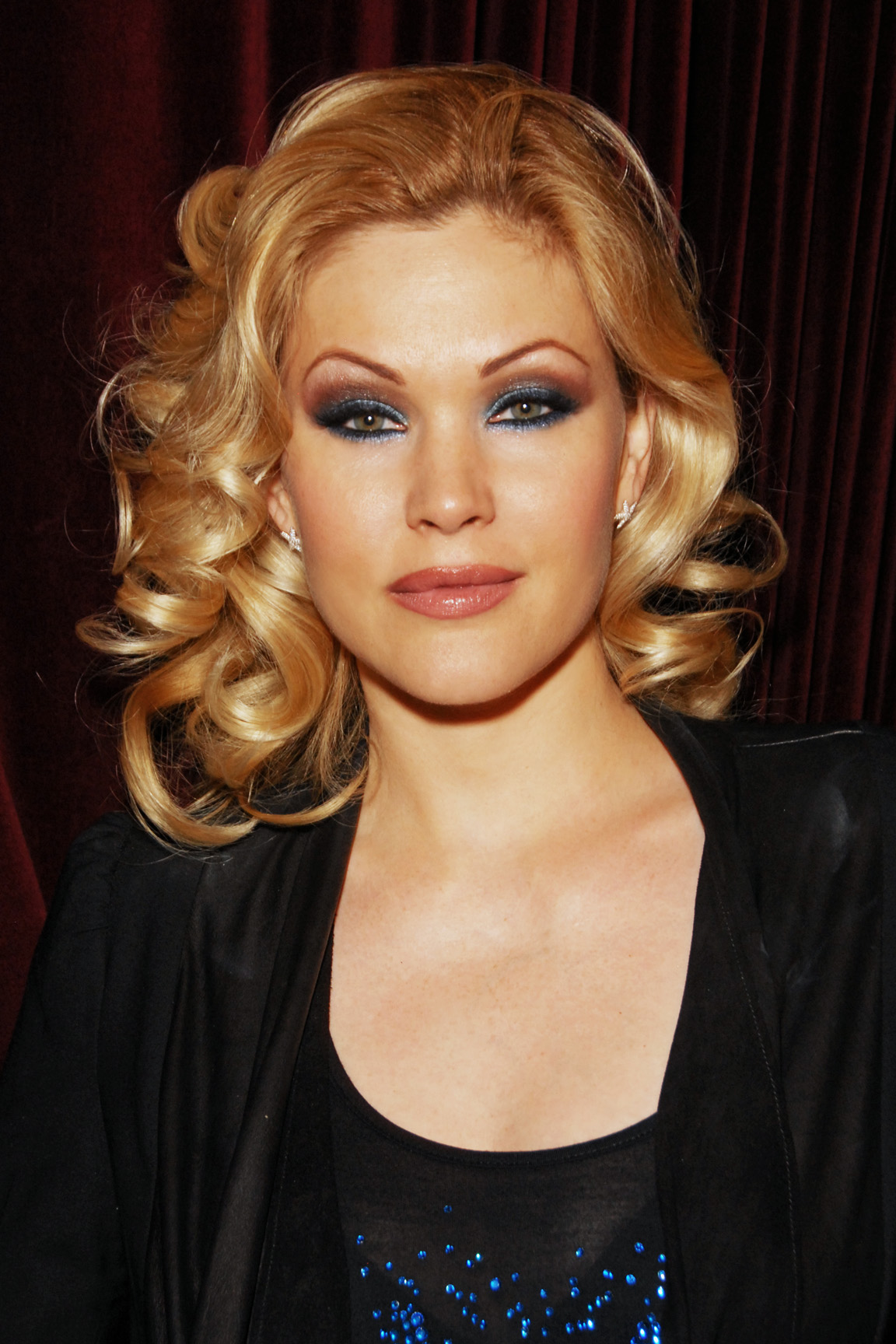
- Moakler in 2010
- Born: Shanna Lynn Moakler; March 28, 1975 (age 51); Providence, Rhode Island, U.S.
- Other name: Shanna Moakler Barker
- Occupations: Actress, model
- Years active: 1992–present
- Known for: Miss USA 1995 (Note: Moakler was originally first runner-up, but became Miss USA after the original titleholder, Chelsi Smith, won Miss Universe. Due to pageant protocol, Miss USA must relinquish her title in the event she wins Miss Universe.)
- Spouse: Travis Barker (m. 2004; div. 2008)
- Partner(s): Oscar De La Hoya (1997–2000); Greg Vaughan (2024–present)
- Children: 3, including Landon
- Website: shannamoakler.com

Shanna Lynn Moakler (/ˈʃeɪnə/ SHAY-nə; born March 28, 1975) is an American actress and beauty pageant titleholder. She was the winner of the Miss New York USA pageant in 1995 and was the first runner-up at Miss USA 1995. After winner Chelsi Smith won the Miss Universe 1995 pageant, Moakler succeeded her as Miss USA. She was chosen as a Playmate of the Month for Playboy magazine in December 2001.

Moakler eventually branched out into an acting career, appearing as a regular for two seasons on the USA Network television series Pacific Blue in 1998, and in 2005 she starred as herself on the reality television series Meet the Barkers with her then-husband Travis Barker, drummer in the rock band Blink-182. She hosted E!'s Bridalplasty during its two-month run in 2010/2011. In January 2014, it was announced that Moakler had joined the cast of the VH1 reality series, Hollywood Exes.

Moakler has served as the executive producer of the Miss Nevada USA state pageant since 2012, after joining as a director in 2011, and acquired the Miss Utah USA franchise in 2018.

== Early life ==
Moakler, who is of German, Irish, Portuguese, and Polish descent, was born in Providence, Rhode Island. She has two older brothers and had an older sister, who died in 2012. As a child, Moakler enjoyed weekend visits to her grandfather's farm, where she could "play outdoors and be a tomboy." Moakler was a competitive roller skater for 12 years (participating in roller skating competitions analogous to ice skating competitions). She attended Barrington High School, where she claims to have been "the biggest dork." According to Moakler, she was 4 feet 11 inches (1.50 m) and 75 pounds (34 kg) until she finally hit puberty at age 17. By the time she graduated, however, Moakler had dated the captain of the football team and was voted as best dressed. She moved to Miami after high school to pursue a modeling career. Moakler later moved to New York City and then to Los Angeles.

== Career ==
=== Pageants ===
Shanna Moakler, at the age of 17, represented Rhode Island in the Miss Teen USA 1992 pageant. She placed third in the preliminaries, sixth in the interview segment, and fifth in the swimsuit competition (scoring 9.115, 9.279 and 9.087 respectively). Moakler made it to the semi-finals and finished seventh overall. Moakler won the Miss Teen All American title for 1993.

In 1995, Moakler was named Miss New York USA and represented New York in the Miss USA pageant, held that year in South Padre Island, Texas. Moakler finished second (to Miss Texas USA) in the preliminaries and in each of the interview and swimsuit divisions, with scores of 9.06, 9.62 and 9.61 respectively, and first in the evening gown competition, with a score of 9.86. Overall, Moakler was the first runner-up in the Miss USA Pageant. In May 1995, at the age of 20, Moakler received the 1995 Miss USA crown when the winner, Chelsi Smith, became Miss Universe.

Moakler enjoyed some aspects of her reign as Miss USA, such as celebrity pool tournaments. However, she has complained that the experience required her to "sign autographs at places like Bob's Home Furnishing Rentals." She was also forced to live with a pageant chaperone, who made sure she dressed and acted appropriately.

Moakler responded to the 2009 Miss USA gay marriage controversy by appearing in a public service announcement supporting efforts to overturn the result of California's Proposition 8. Following allegations that reigning Miss California USA Carrie Prejean had posed for risqué photos and violated terms of her contract, Donald Trump decided that there had been no breach and therefore declined to strip Prejean of her crown. Moakler then resigned as co-director for the pageant on May 13, 2009, stating "I cannot with a clear conscience move forward supporting and promoting the Miss Universe Organization when I no longer believe in it, or the contracts I signed committing myself as a youth." However, on November 13, 2009, it was announced that Moakler returned to the Miss California USA organization, around the same time Carrie Prejean was dethroned.

In 2008, Moakler made a pro-vegetarianism ad for PETA and in 2013 she posed nude for a PETA anti-fur ad campaign, stating that as long as she is the director of Miss Nevada, fur coats would not be given as prizes.

=== Modeling ===
Shanna Moakler
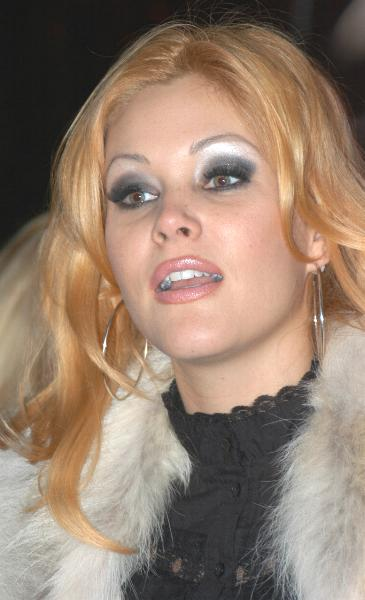
- Moakler at a party at the Playboy Mansion, December 2006

Playboy centerfold appearance
- December 2001
- Preceded by: Lindsey Vuolo
- Succeeded by: Nicole Narain

Personal details
- Height: 5 ft 8 in (1.73 m)

Moakler began her modeling career at the age of fifteen. She appeared in various publications, including such magazines as Cosmopolitan and Brentwood. She signed a contract with Playboy and in December 2001, was named Playmate of the Month. She has admitted that posing nude was "a little scary at first." Moakler's Playmate data sheet listed her measurements as: 34" bust, 24" waist, 34" hips, 5 feet 8 inches (1.73 m) tall and 117 pounds. She later appeared in a campaign for Cutty Sark that was photographed by David LaChapelle.

=== Television ===
Moakler started her television career in 1996 with appearances on Lois & Clark: The New Adventures of Superman and Due South. Moakler then played Lisa in Friends 'Til the End, a 1997 NBC movie of the week starring Shannen Doherty. In 1998 she appeared in an episode of Timecop playing the role of Allison Kendall.

Beginning in 1998, Moakler was a regular on the television drama Pacific Blue. The USA Network series featured a team of police officers who patrolled the beaches of Santa Monica, California on bicycles. In seasons four and five Moakler played Officer Monica Harper, described as the trouble-maker rookie. Moakler has admitted that, even equipped with a $5,000 Trek bike, she was somewhat accident-prone on the set, saying that when the cast had to "ride really close together for the camera" they would often "crash into each other like idiots and end up in a big ball of arms and legs."

Moakler was a celebrity contestant on Search Party, a game show on the E! network. The show filmed at exotic beach resort locations and required contestants to team up for competitions such as athletic events and scavenger hunts. Moakler appeared in three episodes in 1999 to 2000.

In 2003, Moakler appeared on Punk'd to help Ashton Kutcher and his crew set up her then-boyfriend Travis Barker. They punk'd Barker by having a waiter flirt excessively with Moakler while the couple were on a romantic date at a local restaurant. The episode originally aired on November 30, 2003.

In 2005, Moakler made a guest appearance as Mariska on the television program Joey, starring Matt LeBlanc and also made an appearance as Josie on the show Jake in Progress. That same year, Moakler and her then-husband Barker starred in Meet the Barkers, a reality series for MTV that premiered April 6, 2005. The series followed the former couple throughout their daily activities. It covered the couple's wedding and their life as a family while they were together. The show continued for two seasons until February 2006.

Moakler and Barker appeared together in an episode of CSI: Crime Scene Investigation entitled "Poppin' Tags", which originally aired on April 13, 2006. She played a character named J-Lady, while Barker played a rapper involved in conflict with a rival rap artist. Later that year, Moakler was featured on the third season of ABC's Dancing with the Stars, which premiered on September 12, 2006. She was eliminated in week two. She guest starred on several more shows, such as HBO's Entourage, Telemundo's Mas Vale Tarde and as hostess for The CW's Crowned: The Mother of All Pageants. On the 120th episode of NBC's Minute to Win It (aka The Last Beauty Standing) which aired just before the 2010 Miss Universe contest on August 23, 2010, Moakler was the Last Beauty Standing among 10 contestants and was the top winner with $100,000 for her charity.

In 2014, Moakler was one of the celebrity judges to select a new, and second only, male model for the long running television game show The Price Is Right. Other judges included the show's Executive producer Mike Richards and its first male model Robert Scott Wilson.

In 2022, Moakler was announced as a HouseGuest competing on the third season of Celebrity Big Brother, in which she finished in seventh place out of eleven.

== Personal life ==
Moakler had a relationship with rock star Billy Idol in 1997. The couple appeared together in a scene of The Wedding Singer. Moakler has described Idol as a gentleman, but "not too sweet and sensitive." She also praised his intelligence and flair for history and philosophy.

Moakler started dating boxer Oscar De La Hoya in October 1997, and they moved in together in early 1998. The couple announced their engagement in October 1998. They have one child together, a daughter. In September 2000, the relationship abruptly ended when Moakler, who was at home watching the Latin Grammy Awards on television, saw De La Hoya escorting another woman to the show. In December 2000, Moakler filed a $62.5 million palimony suit against her ex-fiancé, claiming he was an alcoholic, abusive to her and to their daughter, and that he used them "as props to promote his public image." The case was settled out of court in 2001 for an undisclosed amount. After the time of De La Hoya's split from Moakler, he had little contact with his daughter, although he continued to provide financial support.

Moakler dated actor Dennis Quaid from February to October 2001. They were together when she was approached by Playboy, and they discussed it before she posed nude in the magazine.

On October 30, 2004, Moakler married Travis Barker, the drummer for the band Blink-182. Moakler and Barker have two children, a son and daughter. Barker filed for divorce from Moakler on August 8, 2006. Later it was reported that Barker was seeing Paris Hilton. Tensions between Hilton and Moakler led to a confrontation at Los Angeles nightclub Hyde Lounge in early October. Hilton and Moakler each accused the other of battery in separate complaints filed with the Los Angeles Police Department. Ultimately, no charges came out of the altercation. In February 2008, Barker told People magazine "No, I'm no longer with her [...] We were actually divorced a few days ago."

On December 7, 2014, the police were called to Moakler and Barker's shared home in Los Angeles after the former couple got into a verbal argument which led to the two of them getting arrested. However, no charges were filed against either party. In June 2016, it was reported that Moakler and Barker were amicably co-parenting their two children.

In 2024, Moakler began dating actor Greg Vaughan.

== Filmography ==
=== Film ===
Year	Title	Role	Note
1997	Friends 'Til the End	Lisa	TV movie; first film role
1997	Poison Ivy: The New Seduction	Jaime	
1998	The Wedding Singer	Flight Attendant #3	
1998	Telling You	Cheryl Tangeray	
1999	Love Stinks	Tawny	
2001	Critical Mass	Alexandra	
2003	Pauly Shore Is Dead	Jail Hooker	
2004	Seeing Other People	Kasey	
2006	Big Momma's House 2	Petra	Final film role
2026	Travis Barker: Louder Than Fear	Herself	

=== Television ===
Year	Title	Role	Notes
1996	Due South	Wife #2	Episode: "Juliet Is Bleeding"
1996	Lois & Clark: The New Adventures of Superman	Pretty Girl	Episode: "Big Girls Don't Fly"
1998	Timecop	Allison Kendall	Episode: "Alternate World"
1998	WWE Heat	Herself	Episode: "WWF Sunday Night Heat #1"
1998–2000	Pacific Blue	Officer Monica Harper	Main Cast: Season 4-5
1999–2000	Search Party	Herself	Recurring Guest
2000	Mad TV	Herself	Episode: "Episode #5.12"
2002	Weakest Link	Herself	Episode: "Playboy Playmates Edition"
2002	Dog Eat Dog	Herself/Contestant	Episode: "Playboy Extreme Edition"
2003	Punk'd	Herself	Episode: "Episode #2.6"
2005	The Greatest	Herself	Episode: "40 Hottest Rock Star Girlfriends...and Wives"
2005	Joey	Mariska	Episode: "Joey and the Wrong Name"
2005	Jake in Progress	Josie	Episode: "Take a Number"
2005–2006	Meet the Barkers	Herself	Main Cast
2006	Dancing with the Stars	Herself/Contestant	Contestant: Season 3
2006	CSI: Crime Scene Investigation	J-Lady	Episode: "Poppin' Tags"
2007	WWE Raw	Herself	Episode: "World Tag Team Championship Gauntlet Match"
2007	Entourage	Kelsey	Episode: "The Day Fuckers"
2007–2008	Crowned: The Mother of All Pageants	Herself/Judge	Main Judge
2008	I Love the New Millennium	Herself	Episode: "2006" & "2007"
2008	Million Dollar Password	Herself	Episode: "Episode #1.6"
2008	The Real World: Hollywood	Herself	Recurring Cast
2009	The Great Debate	Herself	Main Guest
2009	E! True Hollywood Story	Herself	Episode: "Mario Lopez"
2010	Minute to Win It	Herself	Episode: "Last Beauty Standing"
2010	Celebrity Ghost Stories	Herself	Episode: "Episode #2.10"
2010	Running Russell Simmons	Herself	Episode: "You Only Live Once"
2010	NCIS	Missy Dawkins	Episode: "Jurisdiction"
2010–2011	Bridalplasty	Herself/Host	Main Host
2013	The Glades	Beach on Wheels	Episode: "Glade-iators!"
2014	Hollywood Exes	Herself	Main Cast: Season 3
2017	Growing Up Supermodel	Herself	Recurring Guest
2019	The Goldbergs	Flight Attendant #3	Episode: "The Wedding Singer"
2020	Back Stabber	Agent Lockheart	Episode: "Episode #2.1"
2022	Celebrity Big Brother	Herself/Contestant	Contestant: Season 3
2022	Show Us Your Pets	Herself	Episode: "Marissa Jaret Winokur/Shanna Moakler"
2025	Secrets of Celebrity Sex Tapes	Herself	Recurring Guest
2025	Celebrity Weakest Link	Herself/Contestant	Episode: "Ex-Wives Club"

== Notes ==
Awards and achievements
Preceded by Chelsi Smith	Miss USA; 1995	Succeeded by Ali Landry
Preceded by Jennifer Gareis	Miss New York USA; 1995	Succeeded by Keelin Curnuck
Preceded by Gina Tognoni	Miss Rhode Island Teen USA; 1992	Succeeded by Alisha Currier

Irina Voronina	Lauren Michelle Hill	Miriam Gonzalez	Katie Lohmann	Crista Nicole	Heather Spytek
Kimberley Stanfield	Jennifer Walcott	Dalene Kurtis	Stephanie Heinrich	Lindsey Vuolo	Shanna Moakler
