= DJ AM =

American disc jockey (1973–2009)

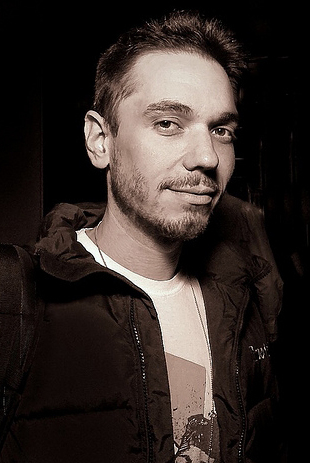
- Goldstein in 2008

Background information
- Also known as: DJ AM
- Born: Adam Michael Goldstein; March 30, 1973; Philadelphia, Pennsylvania, U.S.
- Died: August 28, 2009 (aged 36) Manhattan, New York City, U.S.
- Occupations: DJ; remixer
- Instrument: Turntables
- Years active: 1993–2009
- Formerly of: Crazy Town; TRV$DJAM
- Website: djamdoc.com

Adam Michael Goldstein (March 30, 1973 – August 28, 2009), known professionally as DJ AM, was an American DJ. Born in Philadelphia, Goldstein became interested in deejaying as a child after watching Herbie Hancock perform his 1983 single "Rockit". Goldstein developed a drug addiction as a teenager and was sent to the controversial rehabilitation center Straight, Incorporated. After he left the center, his drug problems became worse; he was addicted to crack cocaine for several years in his early twenties. After he attempted suicide in 1997, Goldstein became sober and later sponsored other addicts through Alcoholics Anonymous.

Goldstein began deejaying in clubs in Los Angeles and joined the band Crazy Town in 1999. He left the group in 2001 and focused on a career as a solo DJ. After he began dating Nicole Richie in 2003, his career skyrocketed. In 2006, he accepted a $1 million contract to perform weekly at Caesars Palace on the Las Vegas strip and was also charging upwards of $10,000 for private events. In 2008, Goldstein and Travis Barker formed the duo TRV$DJAM. Barker and Goldstein were the only two survivors of the 2008 South Carolina Learjet 60 crash, which killed the other four people on board.

Goldstein appeared as himself in several television series, contributed mixes to and portrayed a playable character in the video game DJ Hero, and filmed a cameo appearance for Iron Man 2. Goldstein hosted the 2009 MTV drug intervention series Gone Too Far; he stated he was struggling with his addiction during filming. On August 28, 2009, he was found dead in his New York City apartment from a drug overdose. The DJ AM Memorial Fund, an organization designed to help people struggling with drug addiction, was launched in his memory by his sister, and Iron Man 2, which was released in 2010, was dedicated to him.

== Early life ==
Adam Michael Goldstein was born on March 30, 1973, in Philadelphia. His parents, Andrea and Herbert – both of whom were Jewish – had been unable to conceive children naturally, and they had adopted Goldstein's older sister Lara a year before his birth. Goldstein's mother left her husband temporarily after she caught him having extramarital sex with another man. During this time she had an affair herself, and she found out she was pregnant with Adam after returning to her husband. While heavily pregnant, she discovered her husband had been adulterous a second time, and then she angrily disclosed to him that he was not the biological father of her baby.

Goldstein stated that his father had verbally abused him. As an adult, he realized that this was likely due to resentment that Goldstein was not his biological son. Goldstein witnessed his father openly using cocaine and marijuana throughout his childhood. Goldstein said he began overeating as a way of dealing with anger and depression, becoming obese by the age of 10. He also began drinking alcohol when he was 11.

After watching Herbie Hancock perform "Rockit" with Grand Mixer DXT at the 26th Annual Grammy Awards in 1984, Goldstein became obsessed with deejaying, and realized that it was what he wanted to do for a career. He attended the Quaker school Friends' Central. When he was 14, Herbert was incarcerated for committing bank fraud, and his mother subsequently moved to Los Angeles with Goldstein and his sister.

In Los Angeles, Goldstein associated with a crowd of heavy drug users. At 16, he approached his mother and asked for help with his drug problems. She arranged for him to attend Straight, Incorporated, a drug rehabilitation center that was later revealed to abuse patients. Goldstein disclosed that he was physically assaulted and spat on by staff while there. At one point, he escaped from the facility, but was arrested and brought back after being recognized at Knott's Berry Farm. While he was in rehab, his mother visited him and disclosed that Herbert was not his biological father, was homosexual, and was dying from HIV/AIDS. Goldstein said that after he received this news he "exploded," attacking one of his counselors. He was eventually indicted and dismissed from rehab for his treatment of younger patients shortly before his 18th birthday. Herbert died the following year.

After leaving rehab, Goldstein began attending raves and using MDMA and nitrous oxide. He also started deejaying; he broke into a friend's home while he was away for the weekend to practice on his turntables and eventually went on to practice freestyle deejaying every day for a whole summer. Goldstein started using crack cocaine by the age of 20. He said that taking the drug and deejaying were "about all he did" for the next four years of his life. He would often disappear from friends and family for days at a time. In 1997, he attempted suicide; the gun jammed in his mouth as he pulled the trigger.

Shortly afterwards, a friend encouraged Goldstein to become sober. He began attending Alcoholics Anonymous (AA) meetings, avoided his friends who still took drugs, and dedicated himself to working as a DJ. Goldstein relapsed after 90 days, but subsequently restarted the program. People who complete the AA program are encouraged to sponsor other addicts through the recovery process; Goldstein became a sponsor for several people.

== Career ==
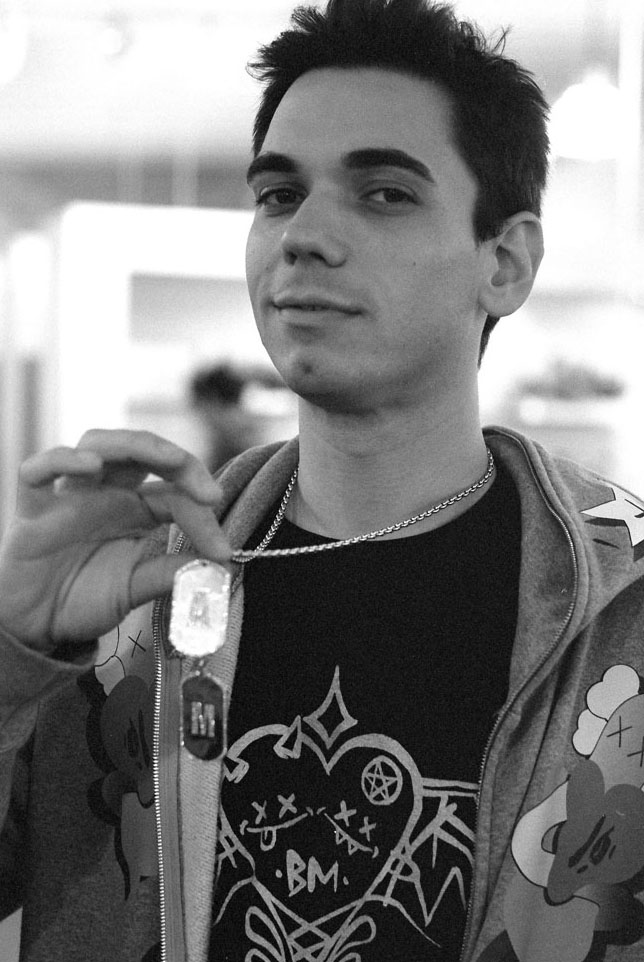
Goldstein in February 2007

Goldstein's stage name, "DJ AM", stands for his first and middle names, Adam Michael. After playing for his friends and at private parties for some time, Goldstein got his first paying job as a DJ at an unlicensed club in Los Angeles at the age of 21, where he earned $40 and a six-pack of beer for a night's work. He worked there for two years. A visiting promoter, impressed with Goldstein's performance, offered him a deejaying job at the Hollywood club The Dragonfly.

Goldstein met Shifty Shellshock through the nightclub scene, and he was asked to join the rap/rock group Crazy Town in 1999. He contributed to their 2000 hit "Butterfly", which reached number one in several countries. According to bandmates Shellshock and Epic Mazur, Goldstein was the group's only sober member. He quit in 2001 to escape the drug-related dysfunction plaguing the group.

Goldstein's weight problems became progressively worse, despite years of dieting; in 2003, he weighed 324 lb (147 kg) and underwent gastric bypass surgery. The surgery was effective, and he lost more than 100 lb (45 kg) within a year. After he began dating actress Nicole Richie in 2003, Goldstein's DJ career skyrocketed. Us Weekly editor Janice Min said that he was talented, but that the thing that set him apart from other deejays was that he dated Richie.

As a result of the relationship, Goldstein appeared in a 2005 episode of Punk'd, where Richie was the subject of a practical joke, and that same year he featured in an episode of The Simple Life, a reality TV show focusing on Richie and Paris Hilton. Goldstein and Richie announced their engagement in February 2005, but broke up in late 2006. Goldstein was a guest DJ on an episode of The Ellen DeGeneres Show in May 2006.

He was an avid sneakerhead, owning more than 1,000 pairs of sneakers by 2007. This led to him being offered a cameo as himself purchasing a pair in the 2006 TV series Entourage episode "What About Bob?". That same year, Goldstein also began working at Caesars Palace, becoming the resident DJ of their nightclub Pure. He was contracted to the club for the year for $1 million, which was considered to be an unprecedented amount for a DJ at the time. By 2007, he was also being paid between $10,000 and $25,000 per event as a solo DJ.

Goldstein scratched on albums for Papa Roach, Will Smith, and Babyface. He played at private events for celebrities including Jennifer Lopez, Ben Stiller, and Leonardo DiCaprio. Goldstein dated singer Mandy Moore for two months in 2007 and remained close friends with her after separating. Later in 2007, he was romantically involved with model Jessica Stam. Goldstein was also close friends with fellow DJ and producer Steve Aoki, who went on to praise him in his 2016 documentary I'll Sleep When I'm Dead.

=== Learjet 60 crash ===
In June 2008, Goldstein and Travis Barker began collaborating under the name TRV$DJAM. They performed at the 2008 MTV Video Music Awards on September 7, 2008. On September 19, after performing at a college event, he and Barker were aboard a Learjet 60 when it crashed upon takeoff in Columbia, South Carolina. The crash killed both crew members and the other two passengers, Barker's security guard and personal assistant, critically injuring Goldstein and Barker. Goldstein suffered third-degree burns to his arm and parts of his head.

Both he and Barker were transported to the Joseph M. Still Burn Center in Augusta, Georgia. Moore flew to be by Goldstein's side, and the media reported that they were dating again. He was released on September 26, 2008, and was expected to make a full recovery. In December 2008, Goldstein filed a civil lawsuit against the plane's charter company, Learjet and Goodyear tires; the suit claimed negligence on the part of the pilots, and a manufacturing defect on part of the plane. He asked for damages for pain and suffering, mental anguish, disfigurement and loss of earnings. The lawsuit was settled by his estate in 2010, a year after his death.

=== Final year ===
In December 2008, MTV reported that DJ AM would be making his first appearance with Barker since the two survived the plane crash. The duo performed at New Year's Nation's Los Angeles 2008 New Year's Eve Party. That same month it was reported that Goldstein had split from Moore and was dating model Hayley Wood. In April 2009, Goldstein left his position at Caesars Palace to become Rain Nightclub's regular Friday night DJ in the Palms Casino Resort, Las Vegas.

Goldstein filmed a cameo for the movie Iron Man 2 in June 2009, appearing as himself deejaying at the birthday party of Tony Stark (played by Robert Downey Jr.). Jon Favreau, the film's director, said that he was a fan of Goldstein; the cameo was supposed to be filmed in one day but the crew and Downey Jr. took a liking to Goldstein and his stay on set extended to approximately one week. He set up turntables and gave Favreau tips on how to DJ in between takes. Goldstein was involved with Activision's DJ Hero video game, contributing original mixes to and also appearing as a playable character. Goldstein and Barker performed at an Electronic Entertainment Expo event promoting the game in 2009.

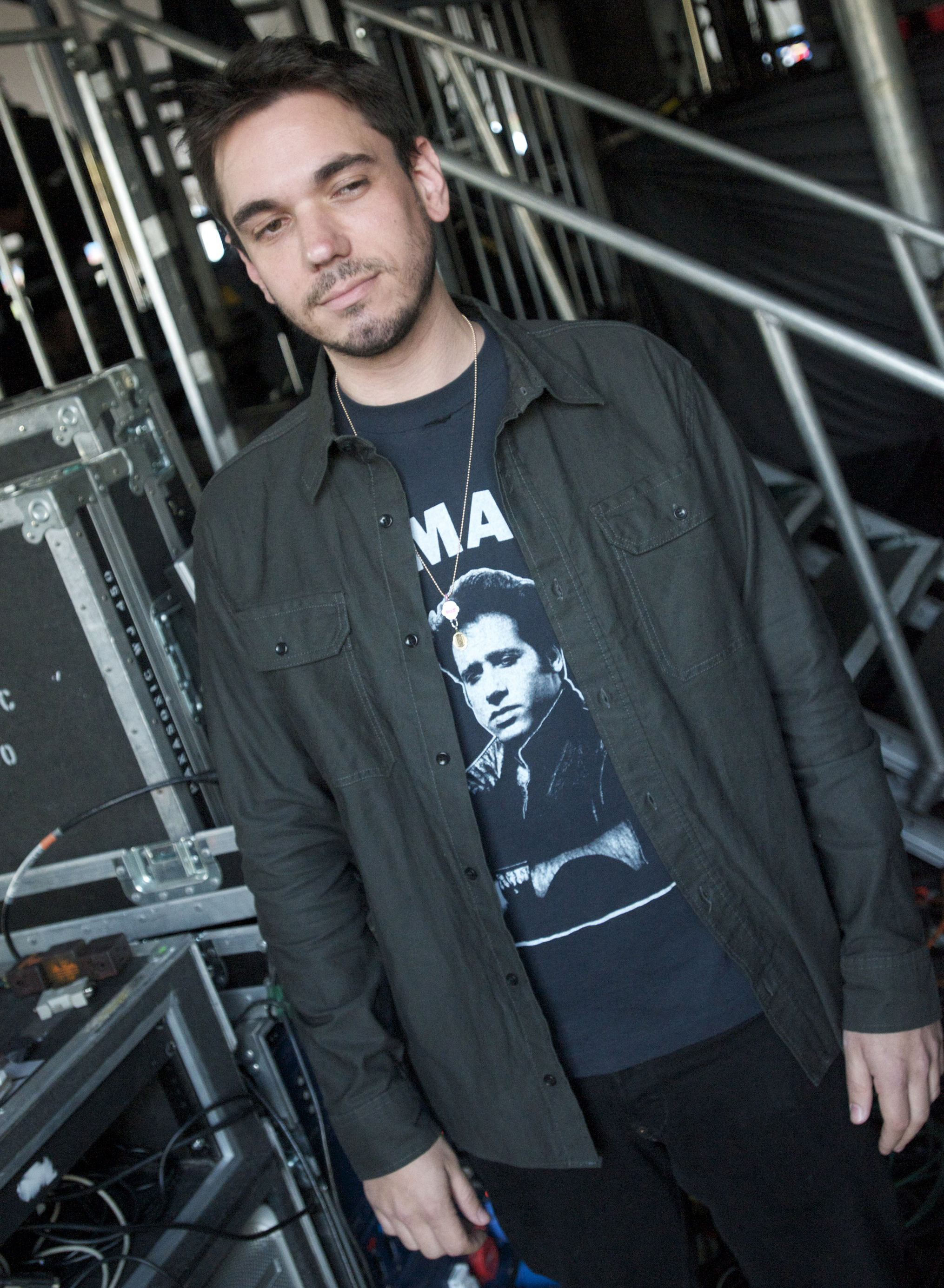
Goldstein in June 2009

Goldstein was the host of Gone Too Far, a drug intervention reality show for MTV. He had approached MTV in mid-2008, pitching the idea of a reality show that focused on his life to Tony DiSanto. DiSanto said that such shows were declining in popularity, and instead suggested a drug intervention show to which Goldstein agreed. The show was still in pre-production when Goldstein was injured in the plane crash. Following the crash, the show's producer Cheryl Sirulnick said she assumed the show would not go ahead, but Goldstein insisted on continuing. Eight episodes were filmed; three days before his death, Goldstein tweeted that filming had been completed.

=== Relapse ===
In an interview with Glamour in 2008, Goldstein said that while he had been sober for nine years, he had to remind himself every day that he was still a drug addict, saying: "At any given moment, I'm five seconds away from walking up to someone, grabbing their drink out of their hand and downing it. And if I do that, within a week, tops, I'll be smoking crack." Following the plane crash, Goldstein was prescribed painkillers and anti-anxiety medication. Celebrity doctor Drew Pinsky said it was those prescriptions which opened the "floodgates" to Goldstein's relapse. A friend of his reached the same conclusion, saying: "I think the plane crash killed him, it just took a year for it to do it." As a result of the plane crash, Goldstein developed a fear of flying, and continued taking anxiety medication to help deal with the regular flights his lifestyle required.

Goldstein was struggling with his former addiction during the filming of Gone Too Far. He held a crack-pipe during one episode. BJ Hickman, an intervention expert who appeared in two episodes, noticed Goldstein "had a moment" holding the crack pipe, and later felt the need to call his sponsor. Goldstein later said of the experience: "I realized my palms were sweaty and I was like, wait a minute, this is not smart for me to be holding this." In another episode, a police officer shows Goldstein confiscated drugs, including a bag of crack cocaine. Shortly thereafter, Goldstein leaves the building, informing the camera crew that he felt so tempted to consume the drugs that it was not safe for him to remain there.

In the weeks before his death, Goldstein's behavior had been erratic and he had been missing appointments. His manager and sponsor were both so concerned that they flew to New York to visit him two days before his death. Goldstein refused to see his manager, but allowed his sponsor into his apartment, and consumed drugs in front of him. He promised to check himself into a rehabilitation center following his scheduled gig at Rain Nightclub in Las Vegas that Friday. When he missed his flight and would not return phone calls, friends brought the police to his apartment.

== Death ==
Goldstein was found dead in his New York City apartment on August 28, 2009. Drug paraphernalia, including a crack pipe and a bag of crack, were found nearby. The New York medical examiner subsequently determined that Goldstein's death was an accident caused by "acute intoxication" from a combination of cocaine, oxycodone, hydrocodone, lorazepam, clonazepam, alprazolam, diphenhydramine, and levamisole. Goldstein's girlfriend, Hayley Wood, denied rumors that an alleged recent separation had contributed to his relapse, saying they had still been together at the time.

After a memorial service, Goldstein was interred at Hillside Memorial Park Cemetery, a Jewish cemetery near Los Angeles, on September 2, 2009. The following day, a memorial was held at the Hollywood Palladium. Among the hundreds of attendees were Nicole Richie, Travis Barker, Lindsay Lohan, Samantha Ronson, Eric Dane, Rebecca Gayheart, Scott Caan, and DJ Jazzy Jeff. Wood made an emotional speech at the service, describing Goldstein as her soulmate.

The scheduled debut air date for Gone Too Far had been October 5, 2009. After Goldstein's death, DiSanto acknowledged the possibility that placing Goldstein near other addicts helped contribute to his relapse. After debating whether to air the show in the wake of his death, MTV decided to debut it on October 12. His family stated: "It is our hope through airing this show that people will get to see the side of Adam that we knew and loved. The decision to air the show has been difficult, but we do this with the profound belief that it will inspire others to seek help". Favreau also consulted people close to Goldstein about whether the footage of him in Iron Man 2 should still be used; they agreed unanimously it should remain. Favreau said that following his death, "there was never any doubt" the film would be dedicated to him.

=== Legacy ===
The DJ AM Memorial Fund, an organization designed to help people struggling with drug addiction, was launched in his memory. In November 2009, 800 pairs of Goldstein's sneakers were listed on eBay to raise funds for the organization. In August 2010, the fund made a donation to the Los Angeles' Phoenix House Academy to help rehab patients develop musical talents. Goldstein's sister Lara, who founded the fund, died from cancer in May 2011.

In August 2011, several DJs paid tribute to Goldstein at the Vanity Nightclub in the Las Vegas Hard Rock Casino, helping raise money for the fund. In May 2012, the eighth annual MusiCares benefit concert featured a special presentation commemorating the launch of the DJ AM Memorial Fund. Goldstein's mother, in conjunction with the fund, was reported to be assisting MusiCares in providing recovery services to addicts. Moby deejayed at the event in tribute to Goldstein.

Goldstein posthumously won DJ of the Year at the 2009 BET Hip Hop Awards. In October 2009 he was depicted in the South Park episode "Dead Celebrities", along with other celebrities who died in mid-2009. Eminem, who nearly died from a methadone overdose in late 2007, paid tribute to Goldstein on the 2010 song "Talkin' 2 Myself", rapping: "Rest in peace to DJ AM/'cause I know what it's like/I struggle with this shit every single day." On the cover of Blink-182's 2011 album, Neighborhoods, "DJ AM" can be seen written on one of the buildings, as a memorial. Goldstein's death is also believed to have influenced the band's decision to retire their single, "Adam's Song", from their live performances until 2018. Wolfgang Gartner and will.i.am pay tribute to DJ AM in their 2011 single "Forever," which includes a moment of silence for him. Macklemore mentions DJ AM in his 2016 song "Drug Dealer," along with several other notable deaths from drug use.

Footage of Goldstein and several other celebrities are featured in the documentary films Downtown Calling (2009), and Electric Daisy Carnival Experience (2011). A documentary film about Goldstein titled As I AM: The Life and Times of DJ AM, was announced at the EDMbiz Conference on June 20, 2013. The film was directed by Kevin Kerslake and released in April 2015. Dennis Harvey of Variety called it an entertaining documentary, but thought, "there are some notable gaps left in the pic's posthumous understanding of DJ AM ... as its flashy surface doesn't always help us to understand the pure artistic soul he's depicted as here."

== Discography ==
With Crazy Town

- The Gift of Game (1999)
- The Brimstone Sluggers (2015), posthumously featured on the track "Born to Raise Hell"

DJ Mixes

- TRV$DJAM – Fix Your Face (2008)
- TRV$DJAM – Fix Your Face Vol. 2 (Coachella' 09) (2009)

Appears on

- Shifty Shellshock – Happy Love Sick (2004)
- N.A.S.A. – The Spirit of Apollo (2009)

Production

- Dilated Peoples – Neighborhood Watch (2004)

Scratching

- Matthew Strachan – Rock Serious Electric Roadshow (1993)
- Papa Roach – Infest (2000)
- Babyface – Face 2 Face (2001)
- Will Smith – Born to Reign (2002)
- Lady Sovereign – Public Warning (2006)
- Lady Sovereign – "Those Were the Days" (2007)
- N.A.S.A. – The Spirit of Apollo (2009)

Remixes

- Three 6 Mafia – "Stay Fly" (DJ AM Remix) (2007)
- Ashlee Simpson – "Outta My Head (Ay Ya Ya)" (DJ AM and Eli Escobar Remix) (2008)
- Johnny Cash – "Ring of Fire" (Team Canada Blend/DJ AM Edit) (2008)
- Weezer – "Troublemaker" (DJ AM and Eli Escobar Remix) (2008)
- The Guru Josh Project – "Infinity" (Final Mashup Mix) (2008)
- Chris Cornell – "Part of Me" (DJ AM Remix) (2008)
- AutoErotique – "Gladiator" (Steve Aoki VS. DJ AM Remix) (2009)
- Bell Biv DeVoe – "Poison" vs. Beastie Boys – "Intergalactic" (produced and mixed by DJ AM) (2009)

== Filmography ==
Television
Year	Title	Role	Notes
2005, 2007	The Simple Life	Himself	2005 episode "Zoo". 2007 episode "Welcome to Camp Shawnee" (archive footage)
2005	Punk'd	Himself	1 Episode
2006	Entourage	Himself	1 Episode
2006	The Ellen DeGeneres Show	Guest DJ (Himself)	1 Episode
2009	Gone Too Far	Himself	8 Episodes, host, also as writer, creator
Film
Year	Film	Role	Notes
2009	Downtown Calling	Himself	Documentary film
2010	Iron Man 2	Himself	Feature film; released after his death (dedicated to his memory)
2011	Electric Daisy Carnival Experience Film	Himself	Documentary film
2015	As I AM: The Life and Times of DJ AM	Himself	Documentary film
