= 2008 South Carolina Learjet 60 crash =

Fatal air crash during take-off

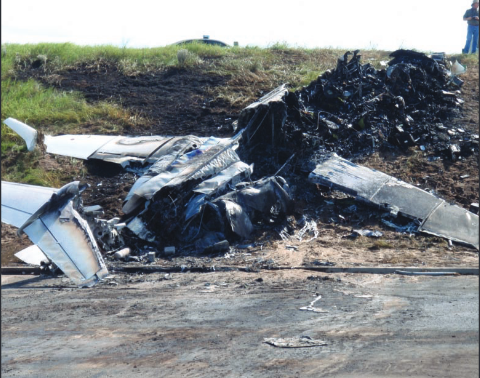
- The remains of N999LJ

Accident
- Date: September 19, 2008
- Summary: Runway overrun due to maintenance error and pilot error
- Site: 2860 Edmund Highway, near Columbia Metropolitan Airport, West Columbia, South Carolina, United States; 33.937°N 81.105°W

Aircraft
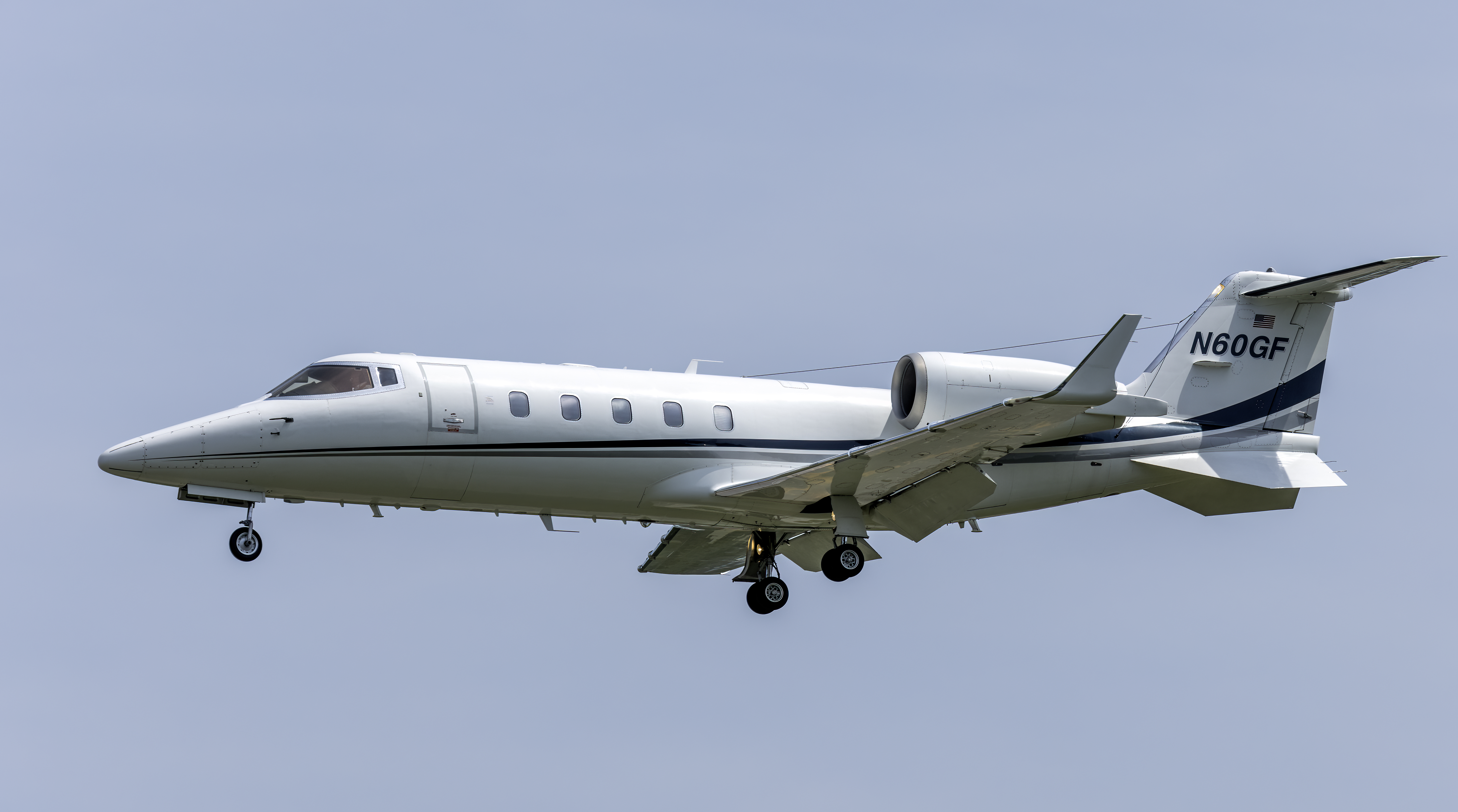
- A Learjet 60 similar to the aircraft involved
- Aircraft type: Learjet 60
- Operator: Global Exec Aviation
- Registration: N999LJ
- Flight origin: Columbia Metropolitan Airport, Columbia, South Carolina
- Destination: Van Nuys Airport, Van Nuys, California
- Occupants: 6
- Passengers: 4
- Crew: 2
- Fatalities: 4
- Injuries: 2
- Survivors: 2

On the night of September 19, 2008, a Learjet 60 business jet (registration N999LJ) operating for Global Exec Aviation, crashed during take-off from Columbia Metropolitan Airport in South Carolina.

Four of the six people on board died in the crash. The survivors, musician Travis Barker and disc jockey Adam "DJ AM" Goldstein, were critically injured. The jet had been due to fly Barker, Goldstein, and their entourage to Van Nuys, California, after their TRV$DJAM band's performance at a concert in Five Points.

== Aircraft and crew ==
The aircraft involved was a Learjet 60 that had first flown in 2006, receiving its airworthiness certificate on December 14. It was powered by two Pratt & Whitney PW305A turbofan engines and had 108.5 flight hours with 123 take off and landing cycles.

The captain was Sarah Lemmon, 31, of Anaheim Hills, California, and the first officer was James Bland, 52, of Carlsbad, California. Both pilots had joined Global Exec Aviation the same year of the accident.

Captain Lemmon had logged approximately 3,140 flight hours, but only 35 of them were on the Learjet 60, and just eight of those were as captain of that aircraft. She had, however, recently completed a Learjet 60 proficiency check. Lemmon had no previous accidents, incidents, or enforcement actions. While she had received notices of disapproval (failed check rides) during her training, these are more common than not, with 72% of pilots hired by major commercial airlines in 2023 having at least one failed check ride. The evaluator who conducted the Learjet 60 proficiency check five weeks earlier stated that Lemmon performed "very much" within standards, and that the outcome of the check ride was never in doubt. He affirmed that Lemmon displayed good Crew Resource Management (CRM) skills and had good command of the plane.

The director of operations for Global Exec Aviation, having trained with the captain and flown about 30 hours with her, described her decision-making skills as excellent and conservative. He stated that, while he would work with Lemmon on being more vocal in her command authority, she was "above normal" for a new captain.

First Officer Bland had 8,200 flight hours, with 300 of them on the Learjet 60. The director of Global Exec Aviation, who had flown with both crew members of the accident flight, described Bland as "a well-experienced pilot with excellent piloting skills.” He affirmed that the first officer had good CRM skills and had no problem speaking up without being overly assertive.

== Accident ==
Police dashcam footage shows immediate aftermath of the crash

Just before midnight, the plane was heading down the runway for takeoff when the occupants heard a loud bang. According to the Federal Aviation Administration, air traffic controllers saw sparks emanating from the plane. After experiencing a tire failure and aborting the take-off, the co-pilot notified air traffic control to send out emergency equipment because the aircraft would be going off the end of the runway. Barker and Goldstein stated that the aircraft felt "out of control" and was swaying back and forth.

The aircraft overran the runway end, crashed through the airport boundary fence, crossed South Carolina Highway 302, and came to rest on an embankment, bursting into flames. It took firefighters more than an hour to get the fire under control.

== Victims and survivors ==
Both pilots were killed, as well as passengers Charles Monroe Still Jr. and Chris Baker. The pilot and co-pilot died from smoke inhalation and burns minutes after the crash. Passengers Still Jr. and Baker died upon impact.

Barker and Goldstein escaped the plane and told first responders four others were on board. Both had second and third degree burns and received skin grafts. Goldstein was asleep at the time of the crash and woke up to Barker screaming. Barker opened the door to the plane and slid down the plane's wing. Goldstein jumped out after him. Goldstein was on fire, but was able to put out the flames by rolling on the ground.

Barker stated that he was covered in jet fuel, and started running and ripping off his clothes. Eventually, he heard someone tell him to stop, drop and roll, which put out most of the fire on his body. Barker had burns on sixty-five percent of his body and was in the hospital for eleven weeks following the accident. He has post-traumatic stress disorder, and did not fly on a plane again until August 2021.

Following the plane crash, Goldstein was prescribed painkillers and anti-anxiety medication. Goldstein developed a fear of flying, and continued taking anxiety medication to help deal with the regular flights his lifestyle required. Eleven months later, he would fatally overdose on harder drugs that he had not used in a decade. Celebrity doctor Drew Pinsky said it was those prescriptions that opened the "floodgates" to Goldstein's relapse. A friend of his reached the same conclusion, saying: "I think the plane crash killed him, it just took a year for it to do it."

== Investigation ==
On the cockpit voice recorder (CVR), the pilot indicated she was reacting to the apparent sound of a burst tire and attempting a rejected takeoff. Pieces of a tire were found at the crash site. The plane did not carry a flight data recorder (FDR).

The National Transportation Safety Board's (NTSB) report attributed the accident to tire bursts during take-off and the captain's resulting decision to abort at high speed. Multiple tires were severely under-inflated and punctured during take-off. Pieces of the tires damaged the plane's hydraulic system, causing the plane's brakes to fail. The captain aborted at 144 knots (267 km/h; 166 mph). The normal operating procedure for Learjet 60's is never to abort above the "go/no-go" decision speed V_{1}, which for this particular take-off was 136 knots (252 km/h; 157 mph).

The captain therefore aborted the takeoff after V_{1}, violating these operating procedures. The first officer can be heard saying the appropriate "go go go" on the CVR. A contributing factor was the engines giving full power, even though the pilots were applying reverse thrust. The reason for this was the aircraft's air/ground sensor was damaged by debris and caused the sensor to go to "air" mode. Investigators also found that the captain had limited experience in the Learjet 60 and that the company's tire pressure inspections were inadequate.

Global Exec Aviation estimated that the tire pressure had been checked three weeks before the crash, but investigators stated that the type of tires on the Learjet 60 at the time lose approximately two percent of their pressure per day and would need to be replaced after eight days if they were not properly maintained. Additionally, investigators noted a design flaw in the thrust reverser system which the NTSB believed may have contributed, increasing the severity of the crash.

== Lawsuits ==
Both survivors, as well as the estates of two of the deceased, sued for damages from parties including Learjet, tire manufacturer Goodyear, and, in at least Goldstein's case, against the estates of the dead pilots. Barker's case was settled out of court in December 2009 and the terms of the settlement are confidential. The estates of Still, Jr. and Baker also reached settlements. Global Exec Aviation and ITAS, Inc. also filed a lawsuit against Learjet and Bombardier, the manufacturers of the plane. The owner of the plane also sued the Columbia Metropolitan Airport.

== See also ==
- Travis Barker: Louder Than Fear
- TWA Flight 843, another high-speed aborted take-off
- Spantax Flight 995, another aircraft that aborted take-off after passing V1
