= Transplants discography =

- Studio albums: 3
- Extended plays: 1
- Singles: 5
- Music videos: 4
- Remix albums: 1

This is a discography of Transplants, a punk rock hip hop supergroup. Formed in 1999, the project consists of Tim Armstrong (Rancid) on guitar and vocals, "Skinhead Rob" Aston (Expensive Taste) on vocals, Travis Barker (blink-182, +44) on drums and Kevin "Sweatshop" Bivona on bass. As of 2017, the band has released three studio albums, one EP, one remix album, and five singles. Their latest release was October 13, 2017.

== Biography ==
After two years of recording, the Transplants issued their self-titled debut album on Hellcat Records in October 2002. In the end, the album was recorded and mixed entirely in Armstrong's basement. The album was recorded with a number of special guest vocalists, which included Eric Ozenne (The Nerve Agents), Davey Havok (AFI), Son Doobie (Funk Doobiest), Danny Diablo (Crown of Thornz, AKA Lord Ezec), Lars Frederiksen (Rancid) and Brody Dalle (The Distillers, ex-wife of Tim). Dalle sang on the track "Weigh On My Mind", which Armstrong, at the time, described as "their song." The Transplants embarked on a full-scale tour around the world to promote the album which earned the band critical and commercial success.

After the release of the self-titled album, the Transplants went on hiatus in 2003, due to all members being involved in their own projects, including Rancid and Blink-182. However, in 2004 during an extensive Rancid hiatus, Armstrong decided to bring the Transplants back together. They resurfaced with their second album Haunted Cities, which was released in June 2005, just four months after Barker's former band Blink-182 announced their hiatus. The album's first and only single, "Gangsters and Thugs" was a hit and the band began touring on the 2005 Warped Tour. After the Warped Tour, the Transplants started to plan a large North American tour with Pennywise and wanted to release a second single. The band had even shot a video for the upcoming single "What I Can't Describe." However, these plans were cut short due to Armstrong reportedly suffering from exhaustion.

Following the end of the Haunted Cities tour, the Transplants announced their second hiatus in 2006. Reasons for another hiatus were essentially the same as they were in 2003. In 2010, the band reunited and began working on new material. The first recording to show up was "Saturday Night", which appeared on Barker's solo album Give the Drummer Some. Their third album, In a Warzone, was released on June 25, 2013.

== Albums ==
=== Studio albums ===
Title	Album details	Peak chart positions				
Title	Album details	US	AUS	FRA	JPN	UK
Transplants	Released: October 22, 2002; Label: Hellcat	96	—	—	—	—
Haunted Cities	Released: June 21, 2005; Label: LaSalle/Atlantic	28	53	140	—	72
In a Warzone	Released: June 25, 2013; Label: Epitaph	58	—	—	122	—
"—" denotes a recording that did not chart or was not released in that territory.

=== Remix albums ===
Title	Album details
Haunted Cities: Screwed and Chopped	Released: November 1, 2005; Label: LaSalle/Atlantic

== Extended plays ==
Title	EP details	Peak chart positions
Title	EP details	US Ind.
Take Cover	Released: November 13, 2017; Label: Epitaph	36

== Singles ==
Title	Year	Peak chart positions			Album
Title	Year	US Alt.	NLD	UK	Album
"Diamonds and Guns"	2002	19	—	27	Transplants
"D.J. D.J."	2003	—	91	49	Transplants
"Gangsters and Thugs"	2005	25	—	35	Haunted Cities
"What I Can't Describe"	2005	—	—	—	Haunted Cities
"Crash and Burn"	2005	—	—	—	Haunted Cities
"Come Around"	2013	—	—	—	In a Warzone
"—" denotes a recording that did not chart or was not released in that territory.

== Music videos ==
Year	Song	Director(s)	Album
2002	"Diamonds and Guns"	Alexander Kosta, Tim Armstrong	Transplants
2003	"D.J. D.J."	Evan Bernard	Transplants
2005	"Gangsters and Thugs"	Estevan Oriol	Haunted Cities
2006	"What I Can't Describe"	Estevan Oriol	Haunted Cities
2011	"Saturday Night" feat Slash	Estevan Oriol	Give the Drummer Some

== Other appearances ==
Year	Song	Album	Note
2003	"Quick Death" (Error remix)	Punk-O-Rama 8	
2004	"Romper Stomper (Skratch Pistolz Remix)"	Give 'Em the Boot IV	
2006	"1,2,3,4,5,6,7"	Rising Son: The Legend Of Skateboarder Christian Hosoi: Music Inspired By The Film	Previously available on a Best Buy exclusive CD, given with purchase of Haunted Cities
2011	"Saturday Night"	Give the Drummer Some	Appears on drummer Travis Barker's solo album
