= Travis Barker discography =

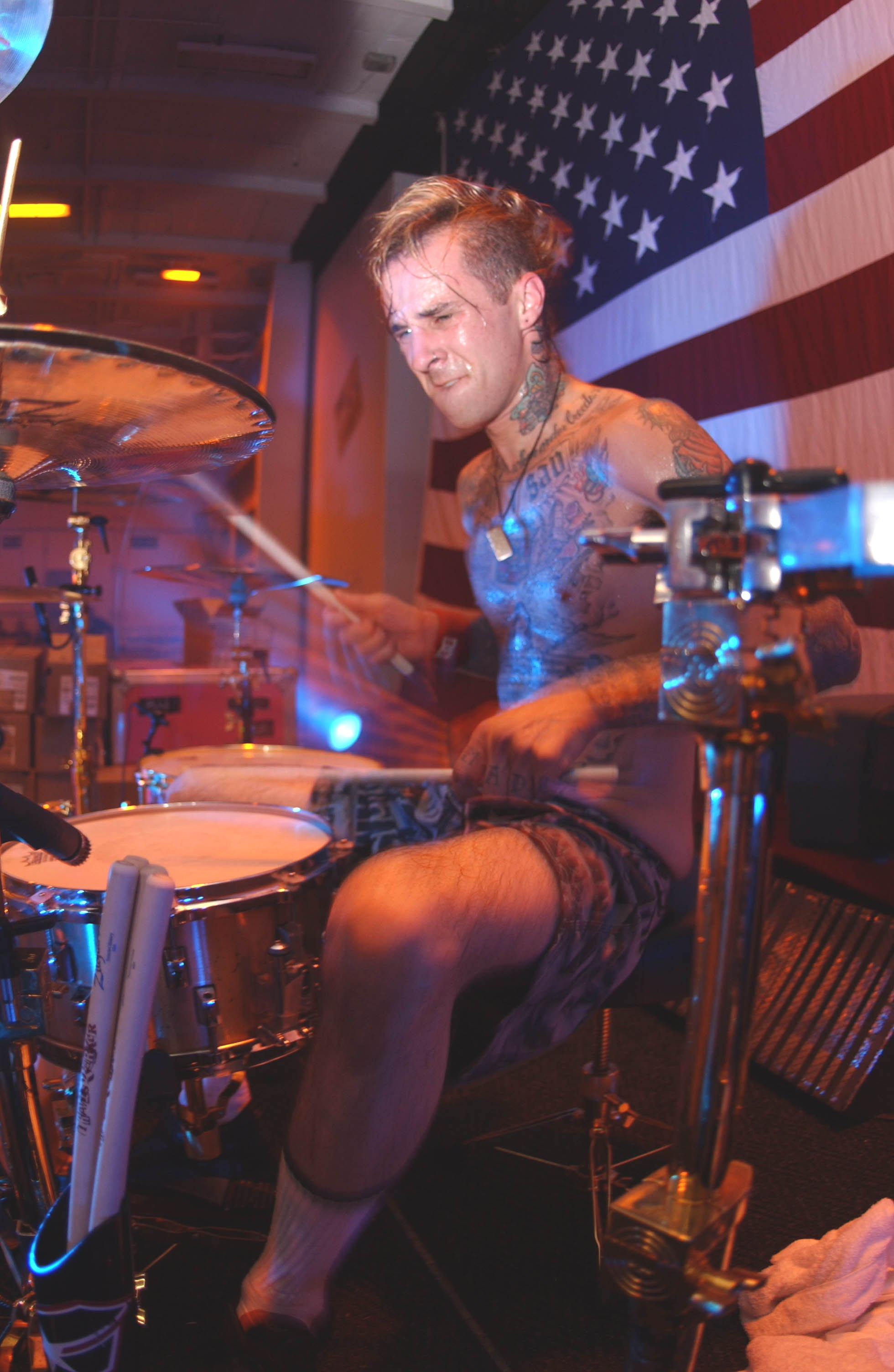
- Barker performing in 2003
- Studio albums: 1
- EPs: 5
- Mixtapes: 2
- Singles: 60
- Music videos: 11

American drummer Travis Barker has released one studio album, five extended play (EP), and 60 singles under his own name. Barker, best known for his work with Blink-182, has been a part of various punk rock bands throughout his career, including the Aquabats, Box Car Racer, Transplants and +44. Outside of his work in rock music, Barker has worked prolifically in hip hop; he was a member of the supergroup Expensive Taste and the drummer-and-DJ duo TRV$DJAM, and has released extended plays with Yelawolf, and Asher Roth and Nottz. He has also produced music for musicians such as Machine Gun Kelly, Fever 333, Avril Lavigne and Trippie Redd. He holds many guest appearances on songs from a variety of musicians, including many rappers such as Lil Wayne, Paul Wall, the Game, and Run the Jewels. Barker became well known in the late 2000s for creating rock remixes to rap songs. His debut studio album, Give the Drummer Some, was released in 2011 and debuted at number nine on the Billboard 200 in the United States.

== Albums ==
=== Studio albums ===
List of studio albums, with selected chart positions and sales figures
Year	Album details	Peak chart positions							Sales
Year	Album details	US	US R&B	US Rap	AUS	CAN	FRA	UK	Sales
2011	Give the Drummer Some: Released: March 15, 2011; Label: Interscope	9	2	2	68	17	178	160	US: 28,000 (Note: United States sales figures for Give the Drummer Some as of March 2011.)

=== Mixtapes ===
List of mixtapes
Year	Title
2011	Let the Drummer Get Wicked: Released: February 21, 2011; Label: Interscope
2021	Survivors Guilt: The Mixtape (with KennyHoopla): Released: June 11, 2021; Label: Mogul Vision, Artista Records

== Extended plays ==
List of extended plays, with selected chart positions, sales figures
Year	Extended play details	Peak chart positions				Sales
Year	Extended play details	US	US R&B	US Rap	UK Bud.	Sales
2012	Psycho White (with Yelawolf): Released: November 13, 2012; Label: LaSalle, Famous Stars and Straps, Killer Distribution	50	7	3	23	US: 11,000 (Note: United States sales figures for Psycho White as of November 2012.)
2016	Rawther (with Asher Roth and Nottz): Released: February 4, 2016; Label: Retrohash	—	—	—	—	
2019	Live Fast Die Whenever (with Suicideboys): Released: May 24, 2019	—	—	—	—	
2019	Meet the Drummers (with 03 Greedo): Released: July 5, 2019; Label: Alamo Records	—	—	—	—	
2019	Bloodlust (with Nothing, Nowhere): Released: September 27, 2019; Label: Fueled by Ramen	—	—	—	—	
2021	My Favorite Nightmares (with Jack Kays): Released: December 10, 2021; Label: Hills Nation, Inc., Columbia	—	—	—	—	
"—" denotes a recording that did not chart or was not released in that territory.

== Singles ==
=== As lead artist ===
List of singles as lead artist, with album name
Title	Year	Peak chart positions								Certifications	Album
Title	Year	US Bub.	US Dance	US Rock	AUS	CAN	IRE	NZ Hot	UK	Certifications	Album
"Jump Down" (featuring the Cool Kids)	2010	—	—	—	—	—	—	—	—		Give the Drummer Some
"Can a Drummer Get Some?" (featuring Lil Wayne, Rick Ross, Swizz Beatz, and Game)	2011	—	—	—	—	—	—	—	—		Give the Drummer Some
"Can a Drummer Get Some?" (Remix) (featuring Lil Wayne, Rick Ross, Swizz Beatz, and Game)	2011	—	—	—	—	—	—	—	—		Give the Drummer Some
"Saturday Night" (featuring Transplants and Slash)	2011	—	—	—	—	—	—	—	—		Give the Drummer Some
"Misfits" (featuring Steve Aoki)	2011	—	—	—	—	—	—	—	—		Give the Drummer Some
"Push 'Em" (Steve Aoki & Travis Barker Remix) (with Yelawolf featuring Steve Aoki)	2013	—	41	—	—	—	—	—	—		Non-album singles
"Cuz I'm Famous" (featuring Paul Wall, Hopsin and Yelawolf)	2013	—	—	—	—	—	—	—	—		Non-album singles
"Spazz Out" (with Riff Raff)	2015	—	—	—	—	—	—	—	—		Non-album singles
"100" (featuring Kid Ink, Ty Dolla Sign, Tyga and Iamsu!)	2015	—	—	—	—	—	—	—	—		Non-album singles
"Out of Control" (with Yelawolf)	2016	—	—	—	—	—	—	—	—		Non-album singles
"I Think I'm Okay" (with Yungblud and Machine Gun Kelly)	2019	4	—	3	59	77	56	14	90	RIAA: Platinum; BPI: Platinum; ARIA: Platinum; MC: Gold; RMNZ: Platinum	Hotel Diablo
"3 Years Sober" (with 93Punx and Vic Mensa)	2019	—	—	—	—	—	—	—	—		Non-album singles
"Gimme Brain" (with Lil Wayne and Rick Ross)	2019	—	—	—	—	—	—	—	—		Non-album singles
"Misery Business" (Note: "Misery Business" appears on the Sold Out deluxe edition of Tickets to My Downfall.) (with Machine Gun Kelly)	2020	—	—	33	—	—	—	—	—		Tickets to My Downfall
"Dogshit" (with Jasiah and NASCAR Alloe)	2020	—	—	—	—	—	—	—	—		TBA
"Drums Drums Drums" (with Wiz Khalifa)	2020	—	—	—	—	—	—	—	—		TBA
"Forever" (featuring Run the Jewels)	2020	—	—	—	—	—	—	—	—		TBA
"A Girl Like You" (Travis Barker and Machine Gun Kelly)	2021	—	—	—	—	—	—	—	—		Paradise City Soundtrack
"Drop Dead" (with Kesha and Grandson)	2021	—	—	—	—	—	—	—	—		Non-album single (Note: The solo version of "Drop Dead" is included as an album track on Death of an Optimist, while the remix featuring Kesha and Travis Barker isn't.)
"Thought It Was" (with Iann Dior and Machine Gun Kelly)	2022	— (Note: "Thought It Was" did not enter the Billboard Hot 100, but peaked at number 23 on the Bubbling Under Hot 100 chart.)	—	—	18	—	76	—	15		On to Better Things
"—" denotes a recording that did not chart or was not released in that territory.

=== As a featured artist ===
List of singles as featured artist, with selected chart positions and certifications, showing year released and album name
Title	Year	Peak chart positions									Certifications	Album
Title	Year	US	US Dance	US R&B Bub.	US Rock	AUS	CAN	IRE	NZ Hot	UK	Certifications	Album
"Crank That (Soulja Boy)" (Travis Barker Remix) (Soulja Boy with Travis Barker)	2007	—	—	—	—	—	—	—	—	—		Non-album singles
"Umbrella" (Travis Barker Remix) (Rihanna with Travis Barker)	2007	—	—	—	—	—	—	—	—	—		Non-album singles
"Throw Some D's" (Travis Barker Remix) (Rich Boy with Travis Barker)	2007	—	—	—	—	—	—	—	—	—		Non-album singles
"Dope Boys" (The Game with Travis Barker)	2008	—	—	11	—	—	—	—	—	—		LAX
"3 a.m." (Travis Barker Remix) (Eminem with Travis Barker)	2009	—	—	—	—	—	—	—	—	—		Non-album singles
"Simply Unstoppable" (Yes Remix) (Tinie Tempah with Travis Barker)	2011	—	—	—	—	—	—	—	—	33		Non-album singles
"Legendary" (Royce da 5'9" featuring Travis Barker)	2011	—	—	—	—	—	—	—	—	—		Success Is Certain
"Cudi the Kid" (Steve Aoki featuring Kid Cudi and Travis Barker)	2012	—	— (Note: "Cudi the Kid" did not enter the Dance/Electronic Songs chart, but peaked at number five on the Dance Singles Sales chart.)	—	—	—	—	—	—	—		Wonderland
"Whaddup" (LL Cool J featuring Chuck D, Travis Barker, Tom Morello, and DJ Z-Trip)	2013	—	—	7	—	—	—	—	—	—		Authentic
"Never Quit" (Mod Sun featuring Travis Barker)	2014	—	—	—	—	—	—	—	—			Look Up
"Bad Man" (Pitbull featuring Robin Thicke, Joe Perry, and Travis Barker)	2017	—	—	— (Note: "Bad Man" did not enter the Bubbling Under R&B/Hip-Hop Songs chart, but peaked at number 20 on the Rap Digital Songs Sales chart.)	—	—	—	—	—	—		Climate Change
"11 Minutes" (Yungblud and Halsey featuring Travis Barker)	2019	— (Note: "11 Minutes" did not enter the Billboard Hot 100, but peaked at number one on the Bubbling Under Hot 100 chart.)	—	—	5	23	69	41	6	59	RIAA: Gold; ARIA: Gold; BPI: Silver; MC: Gold; RMNZ: Gold	Non-album single
"Punk Rock Saved my Life" (Cokie the Clown featuring Travis Barker)	2019	—	—	—	—	—	—	—	—	—		You're Welcome
"Long Live" (Lights featuring Travis Barker)	2019	—	—	—	—	—	—	—	—	—		Non-album single
"You" (James Arthur featuring Travis Barker)	2019	—	—	—	—	—	—	—	30	—		You
"Insomnia" (Smokeasac featuring Travis Barker)	2020	—	—	—	—	—	—	—	—	—		Non-album singles
"Halfway Dead" (Steve Aoki featuring Global Dan and Travis Barker)	2020	—	38	—	—	—	—	—	—	—		Neon Future IV
"Sick and Tired" (Iann Dior featuring Machine Gun Kelly and Travis Barker)	2020	— (Note: "Sick and Tired" did not enter the Billboard Hot 100, but peaked at number 15 on the Bubbling Under Hot 100 chart.)	—	—	3	—	—	—	9	—	RIAA: Gold; MC: Gold; RMNZ: Gold	I'm Gone
"C'mon" (Amy Shark featuring Travis Barker)	2020	—	—	—	—	—	—	—	—	—		Cry Forever
"Estella" (KennyHoopla featuring Travis Barker)	2020	—	—	—	41	—	—	—	—	—		Survivors Guilt: the Mixtape
"Choose Life" (Poorstacy featuring Travis Barker)	2020	—	—	—	—	—	—	—	—	—		The Breakfast Club: Deluxe Edition
"Nothing Left" (Poorstacy featuring Travis Barker)	2020	—	—	—	—	—	—	—	—	—		Non-album single
"All of Me" (The Score featuring Travis Barker)	2020	—	—	—	—	—	—	—	—	—		Carry On
"Acting Like That" (Yungblud featuring Machine Gun Kelly and Travis Barker)	2020	—	—	—	16	—	—	—	14	—		Weird!
"Hills Have Eyes" (Poorstacy featuring Travis Barker)	2021	—	—	—	—	—	—	—	—	—		Non-album single
"Shut Up" (Tyler Posey featuring Travis Barker and Phem)	2021	—	—	—	—	—	—	—	—	—		TBA
"Warrior" (Atreyu featuring Travis Barker)	2021	—	—	—	— (Note: "Warrior" did not enter the Hot Rock & Alternative Songs chart, but peaked at number 19 on the Hot Hard Rock Songs chart.)	—	—	—	—	—		Baptize
"SOS" (Sueco featuring Travis Barker)	2021	—	—	—	—	—	—	—	—	—		It Was Fun While It Lasted
"Transparent Soul" (Willow Smith featuring Travis Barker)	2021	76	—	—	10	—	54	86	27	33	RIAA: Platinum; BPI: Silver; RMNZ: Gold	Lately I Feel Everything
"Hollywood Sucks" (KennyHoopla featuring Travis Barker)	2021	—	—	—	— (Note: "Hollywood Sucks" did not enter the Hot Rock & Alternative Songs chart, but peaked at number 26 on the Alternative Airplay chart.)	—	—	—	—	—		Survivors Guilt: the Mixtape
"Mario Kart" (Powfu featuring Travis Barker)	2021	—	—	—	—	—	—	—	—	—		Drinking Under the Streetlights
"Rage" (Dirty Heads featuring Travis Barker and Aimee Interrupter)	2021	—	—	—	—	—	—	—	—	—		California Island
"Don't Freak Out" (LilHuddy featuring Iann Dior, Travis Barker and Tyson Ritter)	2021	—	—	—	—	—	—	—	36	—		Teenage Heartbreak
"All Things $ Can Do" (Cheat Codes featuring Travis Barker & Tove Styrke)	2021	—	—	—	—	—	—	—	—	—		Hellraisers, Pt. 2
"Play Pretend" (Capsr featuring Travis Barker)	2021	—	—	—	—	—	—	—	—	—		TBA
"Down" (Mod Sun featuring Travis Barker)	2021	—	—	—	—	—	—	—	—	—		TBA
"Right Now" (Jasiah featuring Travis Barker)	2021	—	—	—	—	—	—	—	—	—		TBA
"Jingle Bells" (Kris Jenner featuring Travis Barker and Kourtney Kardashian)	2021	—	—	—	—	—	—	—	—	—		Non-album single
"In My Head" (24kGoldn featuring Travis Barker)	2022	—	—	—	43	—	—	—	30	—		El Dorado (Deluxe)
"—" denotes a recording that did not chart or was not released in that territory.

== Other charted songs ==
List of songs, with selected chart positions, showing year released and album name
Title	Year	Peak chart positions							Album
Title	Year	US	US Latin	US Rap	US Rock	CAN	NZ Hot	SPA	Album
"Let's Go" (featuring Yelawolf, Twista, Busta Rhymes, and Lil Jon)	2011	— (Note: "Let's Go" did not enter the Billboard Hot 100, but peaked at number 19 on the Bubbling Under Hot 100 chart.)	—	— (Note: "Let's Go" did not enter the Hot Rap Songs chart, but peaked at number 29 on the Rap Digital Songs Sales chart.)	—	—	—	—	Give the Drummer Some
"Cool Head" (featuring Kid Cudi)	2011	—	—	— (Note: "Cool Head" did not enter the Hot Rap Songs chart, but peaked at number 45 on the Rap Digital Songs Sales chart.)	—	—	—	—	Give the Drummer Some
"One Minute" (XXXTentacion featuring Kanye West and Travis Barker)	2018	62	—	23	—	69	—	—	Skins
"F9mily (You & Me)" (with Lil Nas X)	2019	—	—	—	6	—	34	—	7
"Darkside" (Iann Dior featuring Travis Barker)	2019	—	—	—	—	—	36	—	Industry Plant
"No Llores Mujer" (with Anuel AA)	2020	—	50	—	—	—	—	88	Emmanuel
"Pill Breaker" (with Trippie Redd featuring Machine Gun Kelly and Blackbear)	2021	—	—	—	13	—	24	—	Neon Shark vs Pegasus
"Without You" (with Trippie Redd)	2021	—	—	—	29	—	—	—	Neon Shark vs Pegasus
"Geronimo" (with Trippie Redd featuring Chino Moreno)	2021	—	—	—	39	—	—	—	Neon Shark vs Pegasus
"Red Sky" (with Trippie Redd featuring Machine Gun Kelly)	2021	—	—	—	32	—	—	—	Neon Shark vs Pegasus
"Dead Desert" (with Trippie Redd featuring Scarlxrd and ZillaKami)	2021	—	—	—	— (Note: "Dead Desert" did not enter the Hot Rock & Alternative Songs chart, but peaked at number 12 on the Hot Hard Rock Songs chart.)	—	—	—	Neon Shark vs Pegasus
"Break My Heart Myself" (Bebe Rexha featuring Travis Barker)	2021	—	—	—	—	—	27	—	Better Mistakes

== Guest appearances ==
List of non-single guest appearances, with other performing artists, showing year released and album name
Title	Year	Other artist(s)	Album
"Goodbye"	1999	The Centerfolds	The Centerfolds
"Provider"	2001	N.E.R.D	In Search of...
"Rock My Shit"	2003	The Black Eyed Peas	Elephunk
"Unwind"	2003	Pink	Try This
"Late Night Creepin"	2005	Bun B	Trill
"My Heart Is a Fist"	2006	Papa Roach	The Paramour Sessions
"You Know Who"	2006	T.I.	King
"I Don't Have to Try" "Alone" "Runaway" "I Can Do Better"	2007	Avril Lavigne	The Best Damn Thing
"The Way It Is"	2007	Blestenation	N/A (Note: "The Way It Is" was initially slated to appear on Blestenation's debut album Welcome to MBugout City, scheduled to be released by Geffen Records between 2007 and 2008. The album went unreleased.)
"Livin' By the Gun" "Jersey White Trash"	2007	Danny Diablo	Thugcore 4 Life
"Black Rosez"	2007	The Federation	It's Whateva
"Elephant"	2007	Idiot Pilot	Wolves
"Slidin' on That Oil" (as Expensive Taste)	2007	Paul Wall	Get Money, Stay True
"Stairway to Heaven"	2009	Mary J. Blige	Stronger with Each Tear
"Let's Get High"	2009	Warren G	The G Files
"Rock N Roll Memorabilia"	2009	Eddie Rap Life	Piece of Mind
"Invisible Ingredients"	2009	Eddie Rap Life	
"Oh Lord"	2009	Eddie Rap Life	
"Waitin' for the Moment"	2009	Eddie Rap Life	
"One Way Trip"	2010	Lil Wayne	Rebirth
"I Am Not a Human Being"	2010	Lil Wayne	I Am Not a Human Being
"Don't Pretend"	2010	Travie McCoy, Colin Munroe	Lazarus
"Fast Life"	2010	Mickey Avalon	Electric Gigolo
"Gone in September"	2010	Mike Posner	31 Minutes to Takeoff
"Intro"	2010	Nottz	You Need This Music
"Take Notes" "Im'ma Get It" "Live It" "Not My Friend" "Heart of a Hustler"	2010	Paul Wall	Heart of a Champion
"Celebrate Life"	2010	Skillz	The World Needs More Skillz
"Hard Liquor"	2010	Tech N9ne	Bad Season
"Blind"	2010	Trey Songz	Passion, Pain & Pleasure
"Don't Keep Me Waiting"	2011	Britney Spears	Femme Fatale
"Sour Apples"	2011	The Cool Kids	When Fish Ride Bicycles
"Warrior Concerto"	2011	The Glitch Mob	We Can Make the World Stop
"Eye of the Tiger"	2011	Lax Boyz	Boarding Pass
"Introdiction"	2011	Scroobius Pip	Distraction Pieces
"Rock 'n' Roll"	2011	Swizz Beatz (featuring Lil Wayne and Lenny Kravitz)	Haute Living
"Check Out My Swag"	2011	Young Dro	Equestrian Dro
"Slumerican Shitizen"	2011	Yelawolf	Radioactive
"Talk to Me"	2011	Young Jeezy	Thug Motivation 103: Hustlerz Ambition
"Black Girls" "Female Version"	2012	Chester French	Music 4 Tngrs
"Regarding Elizabeth (Save Me)"	2012	Chino XL	Ricanstruction: The Black Rosary
"Lez Go"	2012	Cypress Hill and Rusko	Cypress X Rusko
"Sixteen"	2012	Jerome Flood II (featuring Jovan Dawkins)	
"Napalm"	2012	Xzibit	Napalm
"Whaddup" "Bartender Please" "We're the Greatest"	2013	LL Cool J	Authentic
"Dancing with the Devil"	2013	Krewella (with Patrick Stump)	Get Wet
"Back from the Dead"	2013	Skylar Grey (featuring Big Sean)	Don't Look Down
"Live Forever"	2014	Juicy J, Liz	22 Jump Street
"All Due Respect"	2014	Run the Jewels	Run the Jewels 2
"Don't Make Me"	2015	Bad Lucc	Off the Porch
"Never Quit"	2015	Mod Sun	Look Up
"Il messia" "Bentley vs Cadillac"	2016	Salmo	Hellvisback
"Break Your Legs"	2017	The Cool Kids, HXLT	Special Edition Grand Master Deluxe
"Punk"	2017	Yelawolf (featuring Juicy J)	Trial by Fire
"Pain = Bestfriend"	2018	XXXTentacion	?
"Crushin"	2018	Paris	One Night in Paris
"D(r)ead"	2018	Ghostemane	
"DUALITY"	2018	PUNXSTEP	DUALITY - Single
"Sick in the Head"	2018	Lil Gnar	Gnar Lif3
"One Minute"	2018	XXXTentacion, Kanye West	Skins
"F9mily (You & Me)"	2019	Lil Nas X	7
"Spraypaint"	2019	Jumex	Lover
"Heart Break"	2019	Jasiah	I Am
"No Llores Mujer"	2020	Anuel AA	
"Where Were You"	2020	Girlfriends	Girlfriends
"Wrong Generation"	2020	Fever 333	Wrong Generation
"Not My Problem"	2021	Escape the Fate	Chemical Warfare
"No Getting Over This"	2021	Lil Lotus	Errør Bøy
"Don't Fuck This Up"	2021	Lil Lotus	Errør Bøy
"Gaslight"	2021	Willow	Lately I Feel Everything
"Grow" (featuring Avril Lavigne)	2021	Willow	Lately I Feel Everything
"Imu"	2021	Blackbear	Misery Lake
"Tongue in Cheek"	2021	Underscores	Boneyard AKA Fearmonger
"Dating My Dad"	2022	K.Flay	Inside Voices / Outside Voices
"Obvious"	2022	Iann Dior	On to Better Things
"Hopeless Romantic"	2022	Iann Dior	On to Better Things
"Bender"	2025	The Paradox	NSFW

== Videos ==
=== Music videos ===
List of music videos, with directors, showing year released
Title	Year	Director(s)
"Jump Down" (featuring the Cool Kids)	2010	Nicole Ehrlich; Chris Young
"Carry It" (featuring RZA, Raekwon, and Tom Morello)	2010	Petro Papahadjopoulos
"Can a Drummer Get Some (Remix)" (featuring Lil Wayne, Rick Ross, Swizz Beatz, and Game)	2011	Syndrome
"Misfits" (featuring Steve Aoki)	2011	AG Rojas
"Saturday Night" (featuring Transplants and Slash)	2011	Estevan Oriol
"Let's Go" (featuring Yelawolf, Twista, Busta Rhymes, and Lil Jon)	2011	Christopher Sims
"Just Chill" (featuring Beanie Sigel, Bun B, and Kobe)	2011	Monseé
"Push 'Em" (with Yelawolf)	2012	Jason Goldwatch; Travis Barker
"Whistle Dixie" (with Yelawolf)	2012	Monseé
"6 Feet Underground" (with Yelawolf)	2012	Tim Armstrong
"Funky Shit" (with Yelawolf)	2013	Devin Flynn

=== Appearances ===
Year	Song	Artist(s)
1998	"Super Rad!"	The Aquabats
1999	"What's My Age Again?"	Blink-182
1999	"All the Small Things"	Blink-182
1999	"Zip-Lock"	Lit
2000	"Adam's Song"	Blink-182
2000	"Man Overboard"	Blink-182
2001	"The Rock Show"	Blink-182
2001	"First Date"	Blink-182
2001	"Stay Together for the Kids"	Blink-182
2001	"Bad Boy 4 Life"	P. Diddy
2002	"I Feel So"	Box Car Racer
2002	"There Is"	Box Car Racer
2002	"Provider"	N.E.R.D.
2002	"My Friends Over You"	New Found Glory
2002	"Diamonds and Guns"	Transplants
2003	"Back in the Mud"	Bubba Sparxxx
2003	"D.J. D.J."	Transplants
2003	"Violence"	Blink-182
2003	"Feeling This"	Blink-182
2003	"Obvious"	Blink-182
2003	"The Fallen Interlude"	Blink-182
2003	"Stockholm Syndrome"	Blink-182
2003	"Shut Up"	The Black Eyed Peas
2004	"I Miss You"	Blink-182
2004	"Down"	Blink-182
2004	"Always"	Blink-182
2004	"What's Your Number"	Cypress Hill
2004	"Hey Now (Mean Muggin')"	Xzibit featuring Keri Hilson
2005	"What I Can't Describe"	Transplants
2005	"Not Now"	Blink-182
2005	"Gangsters & Thugs"	Transplants
2005	"Another Girl, Another Planet"	Blink-182
2006	"What You Know"	T.I.
2006	"When Your Heart Stops Beating"	+44
2006	"Chapter 13"	+44
2006	"God's Gonna Cut You Down"	Johnny Cash
2006	"Ridin' Rims"	Dem Franchize Boyz
2006	"Side 2 Side"	Three 6 Mafia
2006	"Morris Brown"	Outkast
2006	"It's OK (One Blood)"	The Game
2006	"Let's Ride"	The Game
2006	"Too Much"	The Game
2006	"Compton"	The Game
2006	"Baby Come On"	+44
2006	"When Your Heart Stops Beating"	+44
2006	"Cliff Diving"	+44
2006	"Lycanthrope"	+44
2007	"Doe Boy Fresh"	Three Six Mafia featuring Chamillionaire
2007	"Umbrella"	Rihanna
2007	"Can U Werk With Dat"	QUIK & AMG (the Fixxers)
2007	"I'm Throwed"	Paul Wall
2007	"Crank That (Soulja Boy)"	Soulja Boy Tell 'Em
2007	"155"	+44
2008	"Dope Boys"	The Game
2008	"Low"	Flo Rida featuring T-Pain
2008	"Fix Your Face"	TRV$DJAM
2009	"Day 'n' Nite"	Kid Cudi
2009	"Rockstar 101"	Rihanna featuring Slash
2010	"Jump Down"	Himself featuring the Cool Kids
2010	"Carry It"	Himself featuring Tom Morello, RZA and Raekwon
2011	"Can a Drummer Get Some?"	Himself featuring the Game, Lil Wayne, Rick Ross and Swizz Beatz
2011	"El Caballero de la Salsa"	Himself featuring Gilberto Santa Rosa
2011	"Saturday Night"	Himself featuring Transplants
2011	"Misfits"	Himself featuring Steve Aoki
2011	"Rock 'N' Roll"	Swizz Beatz featuring Lil Wayne, Travis Barker and Lenny Kravitz
2011	"Let's Go"	Himself featuring Yelawolf, Twista, Busta Rhymes and Lil Jon
2011	"Up All Night"	Blink-182
2011	"Heart's All Gone"	Blink-182
2011	"Just Chill"	Himself featuring Beanie Sigel, Bun B and Kobe
2011	"Wishing Well"	Blink-182
2011	"After Midnight"	Blink-182
2012	"Cudi the Kid"	Himself featuring Steve Aoki and Kid Cudi
2013	"Whistle Dixie"	Himself featuring Yelawolf
2014	"Really Don't Care"	Demi Lovato featuring Cher Lloyd
2021	"Silent" of Godzilla (The Veronicas album)	The Veronicas

== Production discography ==
=== Albums ===
Title	Details
Strength in Numb333rs	Artist: Fever 333; Released: January 18, 2019; Label: Roadrunner Records, 333 Wreckords Crew; Format: CD, digital download, streaming
Tickets to My Downfall	Artist: Machine Gun Kelly; Released: September 25, 2020; Label: Bad Boy, Interscope; Format: CD, LP, cassette, digital download, streaming; Certifications: MC: Gold; BPI: Silver
Neon Shark vs Pegasus	Artist: Trippie Redd; Released: February 19, 2021; Label: TenThousand Projects; Format: CD, LP, digital download, streaming
Tell Me About Tomorrow	Artist: Jxdn; Released: July 2, 2021; Label: DTA Records; Format: LP, digital download, streaming
Teenage Heartbreak	Artist: LilHuddy; Released: September 17, 2021; Label: Interscope Records; Format: CD, LP, digital download, streaming
Love Sux	Artist: Avril Lavigne; Released: February 25, 2022; Label: DTA, Elektra Records; CD, LP, cassette, digital download, streaming
Skin	Artist: Ho99o9; Released: March 11, 2022; Label: DTA, Elektra Records
Mainstream Sellout	Artist: Machine Gun Kelly; Released: March 25, 2022; Label: Bad Boy, Interscope; Format: CD, LP, cassette, digital download, streaming; Certifications: MC: Platinum; BPI: Gold; MAHASZ: Platinum; RIAA: Gold
When the Music Stops	Artist: jxdn; Released: June 28, 2024; Label: DTA, Elektra Records; Format: CD, LP, digital download, streaming
Lost Americana	Artist: Machine Gun Kelly; Released: August 8, 2025; Label: Interscope; Format: CD, LP, digital download, streaming
Better Days	Artist: Yellowcard; Released: October 10, 2025; Label: Better Noise Music; Format: CD, LP, digital download, streaming

=== EPs ===
Title	Details
Made an America	Artist: Fever 333; Released: March 23, 2018; Label: Roadrunner Records, 333 Wreckords Crew; Format: CD, digital download, streaming
93PUNX	Artist: 93PUNX; Released: August 23, 2019; Label: Roc Nation; Formats: Digital download, streaming
Wrong Generation	Artist: Fever 333; Released: October 23, 2020; Label: Roadrunner Records, 333 Wreckords Crew; Format: CD, digital download, streaming

=== Singles ===
Title	Artist	Year	Certifications	Album
"Bloody Valentine"	Machine Gun Kelly	2020	MC: Platinum	Tickets to My Downfall
"Angels & Demons"	Jxdn	2020	MC: Gold	Tell Me About Tomorrow
"Dreamer"	Trippie Redd	2020		Neon Shark vs Pegasus
"So What!"	Jxdn	2020		Tell Me About Tomorrow
"Concert for Aliens"	Machine Gun Kelly	2020		Tickets to My Downfall
"My Ex's Best Friend" (featuring Blackbear)	Machine Gun Kelly	2020	ARIA: Platinum; BPI: Silver; MC: 2× Platinum	Tickets to My Downfall
"Pray"	Jxdn	2020		Non-album single
"Tonight" (featuring Iann Dior)	Jxdn	2020		Tell Me About Tomorrow
"Better Off Dead"	Jxdn	2020		Tell Me About Tomorrow
"Drivers License"	Jxdn	2021		Non-album single
"21st Century Vampire"	LilHuddy	2021		Teenage Heartbreak
"The Eulogy of You and Me"	LilHuddy	2021		Teenage Heartbreak
"La Di Die" (featuring Jxdn)	Nessa Barrett	2021		Non-album single
"Love Race" (featuring Kellin Quinn)	Machine Gun Kelly	2021		Non-album single
"Think About Me"	Jxdn	2021		Tell Me About Tomorrow
"Wanna Be" (featuring Machine Gun Kelly)	Jxdn	2021		Tell Me About Tomorrow
"Don't Freak Out" (featuring Iann Dior, Travis Barker and Tyson Ritter)	LilHuddy	2021		Teenage Heartbreak
"Bite Me"	Avril Lavigne	2021		Love Sux
"Battery Not Included"	Ho99o9	2022		TBA

== See also ==
- Blink-182 discography
- List of songs recorded by Blink-182
- Transplants discography
