= Road crew =

Support personnel who travel with a band on tour

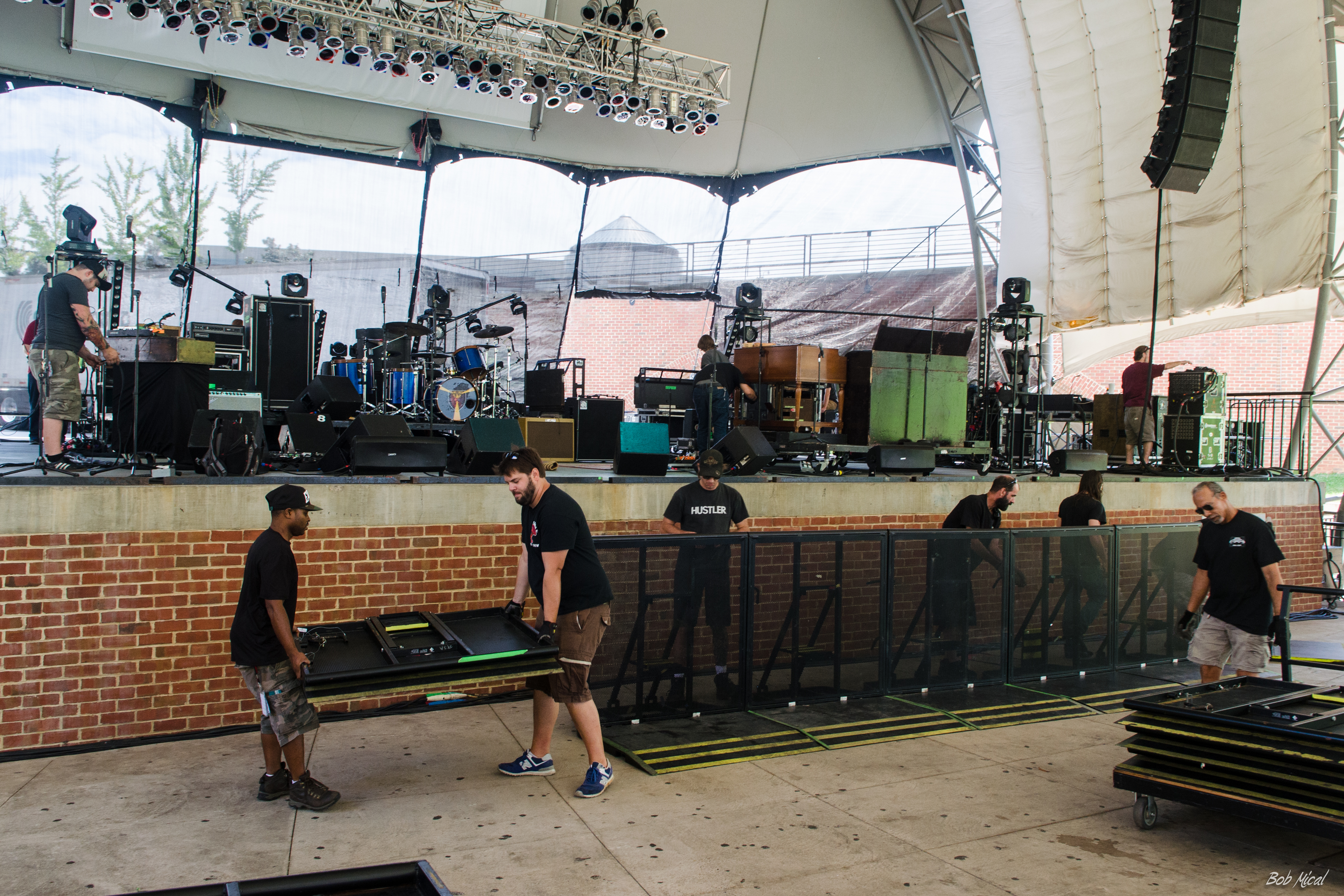
Road crews (roadies) working on the stage construction for a concert in an outdoor amphitheater in Portsmouth, Virginia

The road crew (also known as roadies) are the support personnel who travel with an artist or band on tour, and handle any part of the concert production outside actually performing with the musicians. This catch-all term covers many people: tour managers, production managers, stage managers, front of house and monitor engineers, lighting directors, lighting designers, lighting techs, guitar techs, bass techs, drum techs, keyboard techs, security/bodyguards, truck drivers, merchandise crew, and caterers, among others.

== Road crew appearances ==
The road crew are generally uncredited, though many bands take care to thank their crew in album sleeve liner notes. In some cases, roadies have stepped in to help out with playing onstage. It is common for guitar, bass and drum technicians (who are responsible for setting up instruments and sound checking them) to be skilled musicians in their own right, and they are naturally familiar with the music being played, so there are many cases where they have stepped in when band members have been injured or otherwise could not perform.

- On June 12, 1993, while performing "Bullet in the Head" in Reykjavík, Iceland, Rage Against the Machine guitarist Tom Morello and bassist Tim Commerford switched out with their guitar and bass technicians, respectively.
- The Doobie Brothers' lighting roadie, Bobby LaKind, eventually became a full member of the band. After observing LaKind goofing around on the congas after a concert, the band took notice of his talent and asked him to join as a sideman for studio sessions in 1976. He became a full member in 1979 and performed as a vocalist, songwriter, percussionist and backup drummer for live shows.
- Pink Floyd listed theirs on the rear sleeve of Ummagumma and recorded them speaking on The Dark Side of the Moon. A roadie also delivered the spoken part of the studio version of the song "Sheep", on the Animals album. They had also written a song called "Alan's Psychedelic Breakfast" about a roadie, appearing on their 1970 album Atom Heart Mother.
- Bruce Berry was a professional roadie for the members of Crosby, Stills, Nash & Young, both as a group and individually. He died of a heroin overdose on June 4, 1973, and is immortalized in the lyrics of the title track of the album Tonight's the Night by Neil Young: "Bruce Berry was a working man / He used to load that Econoline van..."
- Pantera, Motörhead and Godsmack even go so far as to feature their crew in their tour videos, and Motörhead wrote the song "(We Are) The Road Crew" about their crew.
- Exceptionally, in the former Manu Chao band Mano Negra, the roadies were included as a part of the band when they signed for Virgin.
- Two songs were written about roadie Ben Dorcy. These were Ode to Ben Dorcy by Waylon Jennings and Big Ben Dorcy the Third by Red Sovine.
- Todd Rundgren and Roger Powell invited roadie Jan Michael Alejandro to play piano with them, Ringo Starr and Bill Wyman on a live broadcast of the Jerry Lewis Telethon in Las Vegas. It was viewed by 33 million people. He also worked the last Led Zeppelin concert in Knebworth 1979, and he was one of the roadies that Jackson Browne wrote about on the Running on Empty Tour. Jan owns Jan-Al Cases with his partner Muffie Alejandro.
- Jackson Browne on his 1977 tour, "Running on Empty", wrote his famous song "The Load-Out" (usually heard in a live version hybrid with a cover of the Maurice Williams tune "Stay") in order to honor his roadies.
- Perry Bamonte was a long-serving guitar tech for The Cure, before filling in on keyboards during the final leg of the Disintegration tour after Roger O'Donnell's departure in 1991. He went on to play guitar and keyboards on four Cure albums, including major hit Wish.
- Coldplay's video Life in Technicolor ii features roadie puppets four times: picking up the cymbal dropped by the drummer, operating the rope that widens the stage, moving a ramp onstage and operating the sound mixer.
- Tupac Shakur joined Digital Underground as a roadie, backup singer and dancer in 1990, and appeared with the band in the film Nothing but Trouble to begin his rapping career.
- U2's "One Tree Hill" on the album The Joshua Tree is dedicated to Greg Carroll, who was a stagehand in New Zealand. He joined The Unforgettable Fire tour, and after the tour he stayed in Ireland and became Bono's personal assistant.
- Stuart Morgan, Adam Clayton's bass tech, filled in for the U2 bassist for a concert in Sydney in 1993.
- James Hetfield of Metallica has been—at least twice—temporarily replaced in his guitar duties by his roadie John Marshall (himself a guitarist for Metal Church) during his various injuries (such as breaking his arm while skateboarding and after suffering severe burns after standing over a pyrotechnical device).
- In their 2007 DVD All Excess, Avenged Sevenfold brings much attention to roadies Jason and Matt Berry, noting their relationship with the band and their antics while the band is on tour.
- Tenacious D wrote the song "Roadie" on their 2012 Rize of the Fenix album to pay homage to their road crew. A video for the song featured Danny McBride as a stereotypical, long hair, black leather wearing roadie who grew jealous of the band as he watched their success from the sidelines.
- Violinist Lindsey Stirling starts off her show by introducing every crew member. Moreover, she records videos of interactions within the tour crew and puts them on YouTube.
- A picture of The Allman Brothers Band roadies appears on the back cover of their At Fillmore East album.
- In 2015, Built to Spill roadies Jason Albertini and Stephen Gere became the bassist and drummer, respectively, on the album Untethered Moon.
- Kasabian's 2017 album For Crying Out Loud features their roadie Rick Graham on the front cover.

== Other careers ==
A number of roadies have gone on to join bands and write music.

- Joel A. Miller was a roadie for Stone Temple Pilots, Guns N' Roses, The Cranberries and Poison.
- Greg Page was a roadie for The Cockroaches before band member Anthony Field asked him to join him in attending Macquarie University to become preschool teachers. They both ended up starting The Wiggles alongside band member Jeff Fatt and fellow student Murray Cook after submitting an album of children's music.
- David Gilmour was a roadie for Pink Floyd before Nick Mason asked him if he would be interested in joining the band as a guitarist.
- Krist Novoselic was a roadie for the Melvins before forming Nirvana with Kurt Cobain.
- Kurt Cobain was a roadie for Tina Bell and her band Bam Bam before founding Nirvana.
- Joey DeMaio of Manowar was a pyro-tech for Black Sabbath during their Heaven and Hell tour.
- Frank Bello was a roadie and guitar technician for Anthrax before replacing Dan Lilker on Anthrax's second album Spreading the Disease.
- Kliph Scurlock of The Flaming Lips was originally a roadie for the band before being asked to join the band as a drummer on tours.
- Rick Biddulph was a roadie for Hatfield and the North and National Health and then went on to play in several bands with members of those bands
- Noel Gallagher was a roadie for Inspiral Carpets before he joined Oasis.
- Gene Hoglan was a light technician for Slayer during their early days.
- Lemmy was a roadie for Jimi Hendrix before joining Hawkwind, and later forming Motörhead.
- Hoxton Tom McCourt was a roadie for Menace and the Cockney Rejects before starting his own band the 4-Skins.
- Bob Bryar, of the New Jersey rock band My Chemical Romance, was a sound tech before the band asked him to play drums for them, following the departure of their original drummer.
- Billy Howerdel worked as guitar tech and Pro Tools engineer for the band Tool before he started A Perfect Circle which featured Maynard James Keenan as band member.
- Jon Walker, of Panic! at the Disco, was a guitar tech for Chicago band The Academy Is... before Panic! at the Disco asked him to be their bass player.
- Henry Rollins, of Black Flag and Rollins Band fame, was a roadie for The Teen Idles, the band that would eventually become Minor Threat before singing with both bands.
- Jello Biafra worked as a roadie for The Ravers (later known as The Nails) before forming the Dead Kennedys with guitarist East Bay Ray
- Ben Shepherd was a roadie for Nirvana before joining the band Soundgarden.
- Kyo was a roadie for Kiyoharu before forming the band Dir En Grey.
- Steve "Mugger" Corbin was a roadie for Black Flag before becoming frontman for The Nig-Heist.
- Billy Powell was a roadie for Lynyrd Skynyrd until he joined the band as piano player.
- Nate Novarro, was a drum tech for the band Armor For Sleep, until he was asked to join Cobra Starship as their drummer.
- Ben Carr was a roadie for the Mighty Mighty Bosstones and became a part of the group when a venue refused his entry on account of being underage.
- Larry E. Williams was a roadie for Neil Diamond before writing Let Your Love Flow.
- John Lang was a roadie for the Los Angeles nightclub band Andy Hardy, pop singer Andy Gibb, and pop bands Pages and Mr. Mister, before writing the lyrics to "Broken Wings" and "Kyrie." He went on to become the founder (along with drummer Russell Battelene and guitarist David Battelene) and the lead singer/songwriter/roadie for the New York-based rock band Djinn.
- Joe Leeway worked as a roadie for the British group Thompson Twins before officially joining the lineup.
- Megadeth has had two instances where roadies have replaced members to become official members themselves: Chuck Behler was originally the drum tech for Gar Samuelson only to replace Gar who was fired. Some time later, Chuck's drum tech, Nick Menza took over on drums when he too was fired.
- Andreas Kisser, of Sepultura was a guitar tech for the founding vocalist and guitarist Max Cavalera until he was asked to join the band as their lead guitarist replacing previous guitarist, Jairo Guedes.
- Rob Aston, aka Skinhead Rob, of the Transplants and Expensive Taste, was a roadie for Rancid until Tim Armstrong noticed him for his hip-hop vocalist and song-writing talent and they went on to form the Transplants.
- Gary Holt was the guitar tech for Kirk Hammett when he was in Exodus.
- Rob Cannavino used to be Bobby Gustafson's guitar technician before he replaced him.
- Richey Edwards was a roadie for the Manic Street Preachers before joining them.
- Before joining Bloodbath and Katatonia, Per Eriksson was the guitar tech for both bands.
- Ronnie Rush, a DJ in California was as a roadie for Hamilton, Joe Frank & Reynolds; he wrote a book about his adventures.
- Ian Roberts (aka TankTheTech) is a tour manager and backline tech that now has a successful YouTube channel talking about touring and behind-the-scenes production. As of 2023, he is the tour manager for Electric Callboy.
- Julian Cope and Ian McCulloch were roadies for The Fall before Cope formed The Teardrop Explodes and McCulloch formed Echo & the Bunnymen. Also, Cope was mentioned in The Fall song "Two Steps Back".
- Jonathan Donahue was a roadie for The Flaming Lips before joining them.
- Tim Quy transitioned from Cardiacs roadie and soundman to their full-time percussionist.
- Keith Levene was a roadie for Yes on their Close to the Edge Tour before joined The Clash, and later formed Public Image Ltd.
- Alex Paterson was a roadie for Killing Joke before formed The Orb.
- Trent Reznor was a roadie for Revolting Cocks before formed Nine Inch Nails.
- Bob Forrest was a roadie for Red Hot Chili Peppers before forming Thelonious Monster.
- Tupac Shakur was a roadie for Digital Underground before joining them and launching a solo career.
- Bobby Gillespie was a roadie for Altered Images before joined The Jesus and Mary Chain, and later formed Primal Scream.
- Ace Frehley was a roadie for Jimi Hendrix before joining Kiss.
- Marc Riley was a roadie for The Fall before joining them.
- Sean Welch was a roadie for Hull band the Housemartins before joining their spinoff band The Beautiful South as bassist.

== See also ==
- Bandboy
- Groupie
- Apple scruffs
- Road manager
