= The Interrupters (band) =

American ska punk band

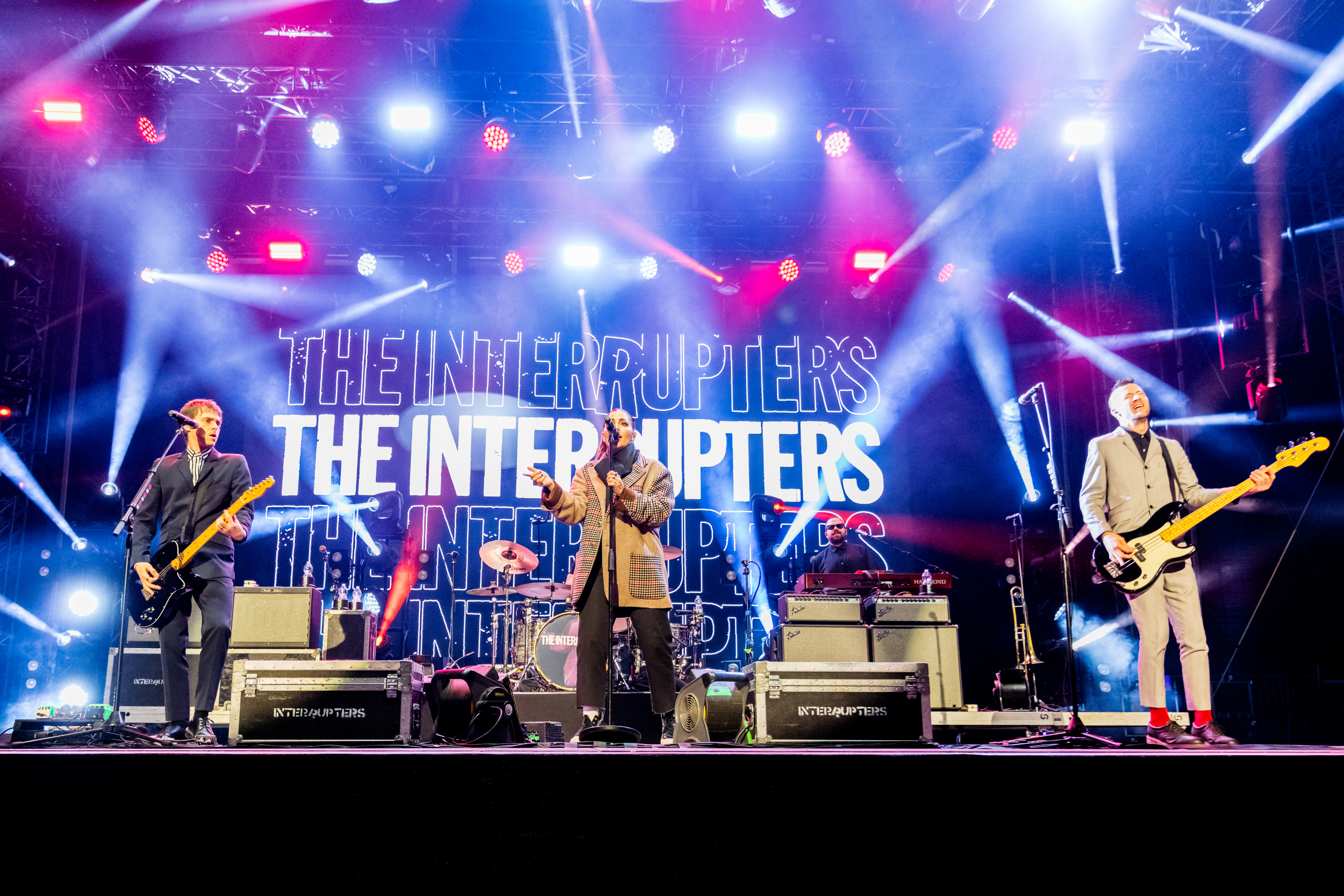
- The Interrupters in 2024

Background information
- Origin: Los Angeles, California, U.S.
- Genres: Ska punk; punk rock; street punk; 2-tone; ska
- Years active: 2011–present
- Labels: Hellcat; Epitaph
- Members: Aimee Allen; Kevin Bivona; Justin Bivona; Jesse Bivona
- Website: wearetheinterrupters.com

The Interrupters are an American ska punk band formed in Los Angeles, California, in 2011. They have released five studio albums.

== History ==
=== Formation and early years ===
The three Bivona brothers met Aimee Allen, a solo artist at the time, in 2009 while touring with their band Telacasters supporting The Dirty Heads and Sugar Ray. In 2011, Aimee and Kevin started writing songs together and brought Kevin's brothers, twins Jesse and Justin, in to play drums and bass. That led to the four forming The Interrupters.

The band got an early start, touring with bands such as Rancid, The Transplants, Devil's Brigade, and Left Alone; as well as playing the American music festival Riot Fest in Chicago and Denver, and the Canadian music festival Amnesia Rockfest, all before the release of their first record. They were frequently involved with Tim Armstrong's Tim Timebomb and Friends project.

The first single released was the song "Liberty", followed shortly thereafter by the song "Family", which features a guest vocal by Tim Armstrong. Both singles were released as limited edition 7"s through Pirates Press Records.

=== The Interrupters, Say It Out Loud ===
The Interrupters' debut self-titled record was released August 5, 2014 on Hellcat/Epitaph Records. Following the release, the band toured the US and Canada in support of the album with the likes of The Mighty Mighty Bosstones, Street Dogs, Less Than Jake, Big D and The Kids Table, Reel Big Fish, Rancid, and The English Beat; and toured Europe with Bad Religion; and also played Soundwave Festival in Australia, and Groezrock Festival in Belgium.

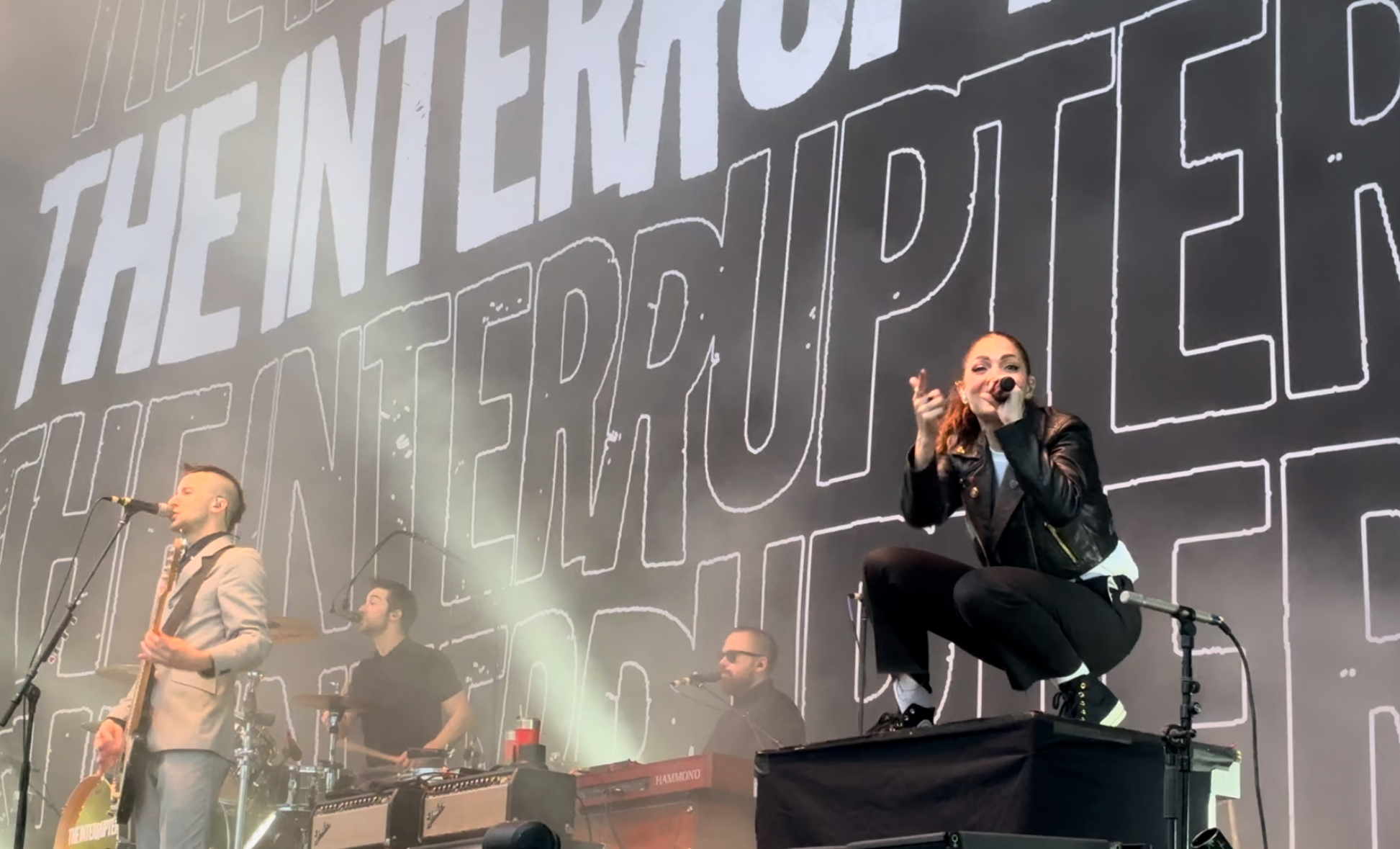
The Interrupters perform at The Mann in Philadelphia, PA on May 18, 2024.

The song "Take Back the Power" was featured in a commercial by Canadian sports channel TSN advertising the 2024 IIHF World Junior Championship ice hockey tournament, which was played in Gothenburg, Sweden from December 26, 2023 to January 5, 2024.

The Interrupters' second record Say It Out Loud was released June 24, 2016 on Hellcat/Epitaph Records. Produced again by Tim Armstrong, the album peaked at number 7 on the Billboard Heatseekers Album chart, number 25 on the Billboard Independent albums chart, number 38 on the Billboard Top Rock Albums chart, number 22 on the Billboard Vinyl Albums chart.

In support of Say It Out Loud, the band played on the entire Vans Warped Tour during the summer of 2016, and then embarked on their first US headlining tour, bringing Fat Wreck Chords' band Bad Cop Bad Cop along for support.

=== Fight the Good Fight ===
On May 2, 2018, the Interrupters announced the album Fight the Good Fight, produced by Tim Armstrong; it was released on June 29 on Hellcat/Epitaph. The lead single, "She's Kerosene", peaked at number 4 on Billboard's Alternative Songs chart. The album has reached number 2 on the Billboard Independent Albums, and number 141 on the Billboard 200. The band were featured on the cover of Kerrang! magazine in May 2019 and were nominated for 'Best International Breakthrough' at the 2019 Kerrang! Awards.

Billy Kottage, formerly of Reel Big Fish, has been touring with the band as a featured musician since early 2019, playing the Hammond organ and trombone.

The Interrupters' single "Take Back the Power" served as the intro music for Hillary, a 2020 docuseries about Hillary Clinton.

=== In The Wild ===
On August 5, 2022 the band released their fourth studio album, "In The Wild."

The debut single "In The Mirror" peaked at number 19 on the Billboard Alternative Airplay chart. The second single, "Anything Was Better" did not chart in the U.S. but the third single "Raised by Wolves" peaked at number 27 on the Billboard Alternative Airplay chart.

In 2024, the band appeared in an episode of the Apple TV+ revival Yo Gabba Gabbaland!, performing the song "Wonderful Day in a Wonderful Place".

== Band members ==
=== Current ===
- Aimee Interrupter – lead vocals (2011–present)
- Kevin Bivona – guitar, lead and backing vocals (2011–present)
- Justin Bivona – bass, backing vocals (2011–present)
- Jesse Bivona – drums, backing vocals (2011–present)

=== Touring ===
- Billy Kottage – keyboards, trombone, backing vocals (2019–present)

== Discography ==
=== Albums ===
==== Studio albums ====
Title	Album details	Peak chart positions									
Title	Album details	US	US Indie	AUS Hit.	AUT	BEL	GER	SCO	SWI	UK	UK Indie
The Interrupters	Released: August 5, 2014; Label: Hellcat/Epitaph; Formats: CD, LP, digital download	— (Note: The Interrupters did not enter the US Billboard 200, but peaked at number 14 on the US Billboard Heatseekers Albums Chart.)	—	—	—	—	—	—	—	—	—
Say It Out Loud	Released: June 24, 2016; Label: Hellcat/Epitaph; Formats: CD, LP, digital download	— (Note: Say It Out Loud did not enter the US Billboard 200, but peaked at number 7 on the US Billboard Heatseekers Albums Chart.)	25	16	—	—	—	—	—	—	—
Fight the Good Fight	Released: June 29, 2018; Label: Hellcat/Epitaph; Formats: CD, LP, digital download	141	2	4	63	127	27	45	82	— (Note: Fight the Good Fight did not enter the UK Albums Chart, but peaked at number 43 on the UK Album Sales Chart.)	12
In the Wild	Released: August 5, 2022; Label: Hellcat/Epitaph; Formats: CD, LP, CS, digital download	145	2	— (Note: In the Wild did not enter the ARIA Albums chart, but peaked at number 15 on the Australian Vinyl Albums Chart.)	53	—	11	10	24	59	3
"—" denotes a recording that did not chart or was not released in that territory.

==== Live albums ====
Title	Album details	Peak chart positions		
Title	Album details	US	UK	UK Indie
Live in Tokyo!	Released: June 18, 2021; Label: Hellcat/Epitaph; Formats: CD, LP, digital download	— (Note: Live in Tokyo! did not enter the US Billboard 200, but peaked at number 63 on the US Billboard Current Album Sales Chart.)	— (Note: Live in Tokyo! did not enter the UK Albums Chart, but peaked at number 29 on the UK Record Store Chart.)	33

=== Singles ===
Title	Year	Peak chart positions					Certifications (sales thresholds)	Album
Title	Year	US Alt.	US Rock	CAN Air.	CAN Rock	CZ Rock	Certifications (sales thresholds)	Album
"A Friend Like Me"	2013	—	—	—	—	—		The Interrupters
"Liberty"	2013	—	—	—	—	—		The Interrupters
"Family"	2013	—	—	—	—	—		The Interrupters
"Take Back the Power"	2014	—	—	—	—	—		The Interrupters
"Babylon"	2015	—	—	—	—	—		Say It Out Loud
"Jenny Drinks"	2015	—	—	—	—	—		Say It Out Loud
"By My Side"	2016	—	—	—	—	—		Say It Out Loud
"She's Kerosene"	2018	4	20	49	1	—	MC: Gold	Fight the Good Fight
"Gave You Everything"	2019	21	— (Note: "Gave You Everything" did not enter the Rock Songs chart, but peaked at number 37 on the Rock Airplay chart.)	—	2	—		Fight the Good Fight
"In the Mirror"	2022	19	— (Note: "In the Mirror" did not enter the Rock Songs chart, but peaked at number 24 on the Rock Airplay chart.)	—	3	—		In the Wild
"Anything Was Better"	2022	—	—	—	—	13		In the Wild
"Raised by Wolves"	2022	27	—	—	30	—		In the Wild
"Warrior Spirit"	2026	33	—	—	32	—		Battle Scars
"—" denotes a single that did not chart or was not released in that territory.

=== Compilations and splits ===
- 2016 Warped Tour Compilation – various artists, Side One Dummy Records (2016)
- Hooligans United: A Tribute to Rancid – Various artists, Hellcat/Smelvis Records (2015)
- Dale la Bota – various artists, Smelvis Records (2013)
- 2018 Warped Tour Compilation – various artists, Side One Dummy Records (2018)
- Ska Against Racism – various artists, Bad Time Records (2020)
