= Take Cover (Transplants EP) =

EP by Transplants
- Released: October 13, 2017
- Studio: Opra Studios (Los Angeles, California); Bloodclot Studios (Los Angeles)
- Genre: Rap rock; punk rock
- Length: 17:05
- Label: Transplants
- Producer: Tim Armstrong; Rob Aston; Travis Barker

Transplants chronology
In a Warzone (2013)	Take Cover (2017)

Take Cover is the debut extended play by American punk rock/hip hop band the Transplants. It was released on October 13, 2017. The EP features 5 cover songs, a redone version of "Saturday Night" (from Barker's Give the Drummer Some) and a new track "Won't Be Coming Back". Its vinyl version is limited to 1000 copies and released on red vinyl.

== Release and promotion ==
On February 28, 2014, it was revealed on the band's official Facebook page, that the band had begun writing and recording new material. On April 28, 2015, Travis Barker announced that Transplants are almost finished with the recording of several cover songs. He released a list with song titles including songs by bands like Circle Jerks, Cypress Hill, Minor Threat, Beastie Boys, House of Pain, and Sepultura. On January 19, 2017, Barker confirmed that Transplants will be releasing a covers album.

On June 6, 2017, the band posted "Friday the 13th. October 2017." on their Facebook page, which leads to rumors this might be the date for the release of the announced record. On July 29, 2017, the band announced on their Facebook page that the new record will be released on October 13, 2017. It will be an EP named Take Cover. The announcement was repeated on September 22. On October 6, 2017, Transplants announced the track list for Take Cover.

== Track listing ==
No.	Title	Writer(s)	Length
1.	"Saturday Night"	Robert Aston; Tim Armstrong; Travis Barker	2:42
2.	"Seeing Red"	Jeff Nelson; Ian MacKaye	1:03
3.	"Baggy Trousers"	Graham McPherson; Chris Foreman	2:26
4.	"Nothing but a Heartache"	Arthur Bickerton; Anthony Waddington	2:42
5.	"Live Fast Die Young"	Anthony Hall; Helen Hill; John Marchington; Mark Coley; Shaun Stiles	3:10
6.	"Gratitude"	Michael Diamond; Adam Horovitz; Adam Yauch; Tom Cushman	2:38
7.	"Won't Be Coming Back"	Aston; Armstrong; Barker	2:23
Total length:			17:05

Notes

- "Seeing Red" is a cover of Minor Threat song from their 1981 EP Minor Threat.
- "Baggy Trousers" is a cover of Madness song from their 1980 album Absolutely.
- "Nothing but a Heartache" is a cover of The Flirtations song from their 1969 album Nothing But A Heartache.
- "Live Fast Die Young" is a cover of Violators song from their 1982 single Summer Of '81.
- "Gratitude" is a cover of Beastie Boys song from their 1992 album Check Your Head.

== Personnel ==
- Tim Armstrong – vocals, guitar, producer
- Rob "Skinhead Rob" Aston – vocals, producer, artwork & layout
- Travis Barker – drums, percussion, producer
- Kevin Bivona – keyboards, bass, guitar, melodica, engineering & mixing
- Gene Grimaldi – mastering
- Kevin Wolff – layout, management
- Mattesyn Wyatt – layout
- Mark Machado – logos

== Release history ==
Region	Date	Format(s)	Label(s)
Worldwide	October 13, 2017	digital download	Transplants
Worldwide	November 17, 2017	12” vinyl	Epitaph

== Charts ==
Chart (2017)	Peak position
US Independent Albums (Billboard)	36
