= Gangsters and Thugs =

Single by Transplants

from the album Haunted Cities
- Released: May 23, 2005
- Genre: Punk rock; rap rock; surf rock; funk rock
- Length: 3:54
- Label: La Salle; Atlantic
- Songwriters: Tim Armstrong; Rob Aston; Travis Barker
- Producers: Tim Armstrong (also exec.); Dave Carlock

Transplants singles chronology
"D.J. D.J." (2003)	"Gangsters and Thugs" (2005)	"1,2,3,4,5,6,7,8" (2005)

Music video
- "Gangsters and Thugs" on YouTube

"Gangsters and Thugs" is the first single by American punk rock/hip hop band Transplants from their second album, Haunted Cities, and their third single overall. It was produced by Tim Armstrong and Dave Carlock, and released via LaSalle Records/Atlantic Records in 2005. The single peaked at number 25 on the US Alternative Songs (Billboard) and number 35 on the UK Singles Chart.

The song "Gangsters and Thugs" was written and performed by the Transplants (Robert "Skinhead Rob" Aston, Tim Armstrong, and Travis Barker), featuring backing vocals from Richard Stites.

== Track listing ==
adapted from Discogs

7", vinyl
No.	Title	Length
1.	"Gangsters and Thugs" (Radio Edit – Tim Version)
2.	"Gangsters and Thugs" (Explicit Version)

CD
No.	Title	Length
1.	"Gangsters And Thugs" (Explicit Version)
2.	"Red Dawn"

CD (Promo)
No.	Title	Length
1.	"Gangsters And Thugs" (Rob Version)
2.	"Gangsters And Thugs" (Tim Version)
3.	"Gangsters And Thugs" (Clean Version)

Note

- †CD version of the single included a B-side song "Red Dawn", which is a non-album track.

== Personnel ==
- Tim Armstrong – vocals, guitar, producer, executive producer
- Rob "Skinhead Rob" Aston – vocals
- Travis Barker – drums, loops, percussion
- Richard Stites – backing vocals
- Dave Carlock – synthesizer, keyboards, producer
- Kim Jade Fry – bass
- DJ Odie – scratches
- Neal Harrington Pogue – mixing
- Brian Knapp Gardner – mastering
- Eric Hellman – management
- Irving Azoff – management
- Jared Paul – management
- Estevan Oriol – photography

== Charts ==
Chart (2005)	Peak position
UK Singles Chart	35
US Alternative Songs (Billboard)	25
