= In a Warzone =

Studio album by Transplants
- Released: June 25, 2013
- Studios: Opra Music Studios (North Hollywood, CA); The Boat (Silver Lake, Los Angeles, CA)
- Genres: Rap rock; punk rock
- Length: 30:09
- Label: Epitaph
- Producers: Transplants; Christopher Holmes (add.)

Transplants chronology
Haunted Cities (2005)	In a Warzone (2013)	Take Cover (2017)

Singles from In A Warzone
- 1. "Come Around" Released: May 14, 2013

Professional ratings
Aggregate scores
Source	Rating
AnyDecentMusic?	5.8/10
Metacritic	64/100
Review scores
Source	Rating
AllMusic	3.5/5 stars
Alternative Press	3/5 stars
Consequence of Sound	3/5 stars
DIY	7/10
Rolling Stone	3/5 stars

In a Warzone is the third album by the American punk rock/hip hop band Transplants. It was premiered as a stream on Rolling Stone's website on June 17, 2013, and released via Epitaph Records on June 25, 2013. The recording sessions took place at Opra Music Studios and The Boat in Los Angeles. It was produced by the Transplants and Christopher Holmes. Rancid's Matt Freeman, Left Alone's Elvis Cortez, UGK's Bun B, Bored Stiff's Equipto, and Expensive Taste's Paul Wall made their appearances on the album as additional musicians and vocalists. The band supported the album by touring with Rancid.

The album peaked at No. 58 on the Billboard 200 in the United States. The lead single was "Come Around".

== Track listing ==
No.	Title	Length
1.	"In a Warzone"	2:07
2.	"See It to Believe It"	3:05
3.	"Back to You"	2:49
4.	"Come Around"	2:49
5.	"Something's Different" (featuring Bun B & Equipto)	3:05
6.	"Any of Them"	2:25
7.	"Silence"	1:49
8.	"All Over Again"	2:02
9.	"It's a Problem" (featuring Paul Wall)	3:15
10.	"Completely Detach"	2:00
11.	"Gravestones and Burial Plots"	2:44
12.	"Exit the Wasteland"	1:55
Total length:		30:09

== Personnel ==
- Tim Armstrong – vocals, guitar
- Rob "Skinhead Rob" Aston – vocals, photography, design & layout
- Travis Barker – drums
- Kevin Bivona – acoustic guitar, bass, keyboards, engineering
- Elvis Cortez – guitar
- Bernard Freeman – vocals (track 5)
- Ilych Sato – vocals (track 5)
- Paul Slayton – vocals (track 9)
- Matt Freeman – bass (track 9)
- Christopher Holmes – additional producer, engineering, mixing
- James M. Ingram – engineering
- Brian Gardner – mastering
- Estevan Oriol – photography
- Usugrow – artwork
- Mark Machado – artwork
- Nick Pritchard – design & layout

== Charts ==
Chart (2013)	Peak position
US Billboard 200	58
US Top Rock Albums (Billboard)	19
US Top Alternative Albums (Billboard)	12
US Vinyl Albums (Billboard)	2
US Independent Albums (Billboard)	14
US Indie Store Album Sales (Billboard)	18
