= Let's Go (Travis Barker song) =

2011 song by Travis Barker featuring Yelawolf, Twista, Busta Rhymes & Lil Jon

Single by Travis Barker featuring Yelawolf, Twista, Busta Rhymes & Lil Jon

from the album Give the Drummer Some
- Released: March 2011
- Genre: Rap rock
- Length: 3:13
- Label: Interscope
- Songwriters: Travis Barker; Michael Atha; Carl Mitchell; Trevor Smith Jr.; Jonathan Smith; Kevin Bivona; Robert Duncan; L. Duncan
- Producer: Barker

Music video
- "Let's Go" on YouTube

"Let's Go" is a song by American drummer Travis Barker, featuring rappers Yelawolf, Twista, Busta Rhymes and Lil Jon. It appears as the fourth track on Barker's 2011 debut solo album, Give the Drummer Some, released through Interscope Records.

== Background and release ==
In early March 2011, the song was released in advance of Give the Drummer Some, which was scheduled to be issued on March 15.

== Critical reception ==
A preview of the song noted that Twista's verse stood out among the track's featured artists. In a review of Give the Drummer Some for AllMusic, Gregory Heaney wrote that on songs such as "Let's Go", Barker deemphasizes his rock-oriented style to allow the featured rappers, Yelawolf, Busta Rhymes, Lil Jon, and Twista, to take the lead. Reviews of the album highlighted the song's strong performances. One noted the contributions of Busta Rhymes, Twista, and Yelawolf, along with a high-energy chorus from Lil Jon, while another described it as a standout track for its fast verses from Busta Rhymes, Twista, and Yelawolf, though Lil Jon's chorus drew mixed responses. In a retrospective list of Barker's notable collaborations, Billboard said the song begins with a verse from Busta Rhymes, followed by fast verses from Yelawolf, Twista, and Lil Jon, and highlighted its rapid lyrical delivery.

== Music video ==
The music video is set in an auction house, where Barker plays drums as a group of well-dressed onlookers watches. Busta Rhymes, Twista, and Yelawolf appear in black suits performing their verses, while Lil Jon makes brief appearances using his characteristic ad-libs. Barker and the featured artists turn the formal event into a lively party, which ends with the arrival of police. The video was released on July 29, 2011, following behind-the-scenes footage shared by Twista.

== Personnel ==
Credits are adapted from Apple Music.

Performers

- Travis Barker - drums, songwriter, producer
- Yelawolf - vocals, songwriter
- Twista - vocals, songwriter
- Busta Rhymes - vocals, songwriter
- Lil Jon - vocals, songwriter

Additional credits

- Kevin Bivona - songwriter
- Robert Duncan - songwriter
- L. Duncan - songwriter

== Charts ==
Chart (2011)	Peak position
US Bubbling Under Hot 100 (Billboard)	19
US Rap Digital Song Sales (Billboard)	29
