= Psycho White =

EP by Travis Barker and Yelawolf
- Released: November 13, 2012
- Recorded: 2012
- Genre: Rap rock; alternative hip-hop; horrorcore; reggae rock
- Label: LaSalle; Killer Distribution
- Producer: Travis Barker (also exec.); Yelawolf (exec.)

Yelawolf chronology
Heart of Dixie (2012)	Psycho White (2012)	Trunk Muzik Returns (2013)

Travis Barker chronology
Give the Drummer Some (2011)	Psycho White (2012)	Rawther (2016)

Singles from Psycho White
- 1. "Push 'Em" Released: September 12, 2012

Professional ratings
Review scores
Source	Rating
AllMusic	3.5/5 stars

Psycho White is a collaborative EP by American drummer Travis Barker and rapper Yelawolf. It was released on November 13, 2012, under LaSalle Records and Killer Distribution. The first single of the EP, "Push 'Em" was released as a free download via Yelawolf's Twitter page and on numerous hip-hop websites on September 12. The artwork was released the same day as well as a behind-the-scenes video of how the artwork was created.

Yelawolf and Travis Barker broke down the meaning behind their project track-by-track with Sean Lynch of The Source Magazine. Part 1 also saw Yelawolf and Travis Barker hinting at a possible sequel and Warped Tour dates.

A remix version of the single "Push 'Em" by Steve Aoki and Travis Barker, was later released on Dim Mak Records.

== Commercial performance ==
In its first week, Psycho White sold 11,962 copies debuting at number 50 on the US Billboard 200 chart and number 7 on the R&B albums chart.

== Track listing ==
No.	Title	Lyrics	Producer(s)	Length
1.	"Push 'Em" (background vocals by Skinhead Rob & Tim Armstrong)	Travis Barker; Yelawolf	Travis Barker	3:13
2.	"6 Feet Underground" (featuring Tim Armstrong)	Travis Barker; Yelawolf; Tim Armstrong	Travis Barker	4:48
3.	"Funky Shit"	Travis Barker; Yelawolf	Travis Barker	3:39
4.	"Whistle Dixie"	Travis Barker; Yelawolf	Travis Barker	3:01
5.	"Director's Cut (Michael Myers & Superman)"	Travis Barker; Yelawolf; Dawaun Parker; Kevin Bivona	Travis Barker	4:46

== Personnel ==
Credits for Psycho White adapted from AllMusic.

- Tim Armstrong – composer, featured artist, guitar, background vocals
- Travis Barker – executive producer, drum programming, drums, primary artist, producer
- Kevin Bivona – keyboards
- Brian "Big Bass" Gardner – mastering
- Chris Holmes – engineer
- Mix Master Mike – cut, scratching, producer
- Dawaun Parker – composer
- Neal H. Pogue – mixing
- Skinhead Rob – featured artist, background vocals
- Lawrence Vavra – management
- Francesco Vescovi – artwork, cover art
- Jenniger Wienman – publicity
- Yelawolf – executive producer, primary artist, composer
