= Haunted Cities =

Studio album by Transplants
- Released: June 21, 2005
- Recorded: 2004–2005
- Studio: Tim's Basement (Los Angeles, CA); Conway Studios (Los Angeles, CA); Steakhouse Studio (Los Angeles, CA); Ameraycan Recording (Los Angeles, CA); 27 Space (Los Angeles, CA)
- Genre: Rap rock; punk rock; alternative hip hop
- Length: 40:06
- Label: LaSalle Records; Atlantic
- Producer: Tim Armstrong (also exec.); Dave Carlock

Transplants chronology
Transplants (2002)	Haunted Cities (2005)	In a Warzone (2013)

Singles from Haunted Cities
- 1. "Gangsters and Thugs" Released: May 23, 2005; 2. "What I Can't Describe" Released: 2005; 3. "Crash and Burn" Released: August 29, 2005

Screwed and chopped version cover

Haunted Cities is the second studio album by the American punk rock/hip hop band Transplants. It was released on June 21, 2005, via LaSalle Records/Atlantic Records, and sold close to 34,000 copies in its first week and came in at #28 on the US Billboard 200, #72 on the UK Albums Chart, #140 on the Top 200 Albums France.

== Production ==
Audio production of the record was handled by Tim Armstrong and Dave Carlock. Rancid's Matt Freeman, The Slackers' Vic Ruggiero, Cypress Hill's B-Real and Sen Dog, Dilated Peoples' Rakaa, and Boo-Yaa T.R.I.B.E. made their appearances on the album as additional musicians and vocalists. Houston-based rapper Paul Wall made screwed and chopped version of the album, released months later the same year.

== Background ==
The album spawned three singles: "Gangsters and Thugs", "What I Can't Describe" and "Crash and Burn". Its lead single, "Gangsters and Thugs", peaked at #25 on the US Alternative Songs and #35 on the UK Singles Chart. It also included two bonus tracks: "Red Dawn", which was previously released as B-side of CD formatted "Gangsters and Thugs" single and was added later on as the thirteenth track on the Japanese version of Haunted Cities, and "1, 2, 3, 4, 5, 6, 7", which was dropped as non-album promotional single and was added later as the thirteenth track on its Best Buy edition.

== Critical reception ==
Professional ratings
Aggregate scores
Source	Rating
Metacritic	55/100
Review scores
Source	Rating
AllMusic	4/5 stars
E! Online	B+
Robert Christgau	(2-star Honorable Mention)

Haunted Cities was met with "mixed or averages" reviews from critics. At Metacritic, which assigns a weighted average rating out of 100 to reviews from mainstream publications, this release received an average score of 55 based on 11 reviews.

In a review for AllMusic, Johnny Loftus noted how the album "suffers lyrically", while going on to say, "the whole package ends up having this strangely alluring glimmer. It's like discovering California Babylon after being lost in suburbia." E! Online explained: "Haunted Cities has more of a street-smarts vibe and is actually more listenable. Despite some song titles that foreshadow darker themes, this musical locale is more inviting than intimidating."

== Track listing ==
No.	Title	Writer(s)	Length
1.	"Not Today" (featuring Sen Dog)	T. Armstrong; R. Aston; S. Reyes; T. Barker	2:41
2.	"Apocalypse Now"	T. Armstrong; R. Aston; T. Barker	3:16
3.	"Gangsters and Thugs"	T. Armstrong; R. Aston; T. Barker	3:54
4.	"What I Can't Describe" (featuring Boo-Yaa T.R.I.B.E.)	T. Armstrong; R. Aston; P. Devoux; T. Barker	4:02
5.	"Doomsday"	T. Armstrong; R. Aston; T. Barker	3:49
6.	"Killafornia" (featuring B-Real)	T. Armstrong; R. Aston; L. Freese; T. Barker	3:47
7.	"American Guns"	T. Armstrong; R. Aston; T. Barker	2:38
8.	"Madness"	T. Armstrong; R. Aston; D. Carlock; T. Barker	3:09
9.	"Hit the Fence"	T. Armstrong; R. Aston; T. Barker	2:12
10.	"Pay Any Price"	T. Armstrong; R. Aston; T. Barker	1:57
11.	"I Want It All"	T. Armstrong; R. Aston; T. Barker	3:56
12.	"Crash and Burn" (featuring Rakaa Iriscience)	T. Armstrong; R. Aston; R. Taylor; T. Barker	4:45
Total length:			40:06

Japanese edition bonus track
No.	Title	Length
13.	"Red Dawn"	3:52

Best Buy bonus track
No.	Title	Length
13.	"1, 2, 3, 4, 5, 6, 7"	3:58

== Personnel ==
- Tim Armstrong - vocals, bass, guitar, keyboards, synthesizer, executive producer, producer, engineering
- Rob "Skinhead Rob" Aston - vocals
- Travis Barker - drums, loops, percussion
- Sen Dog - vocals (track 1)
- Paul Devoux - vocals (track 4)
- Vincent Devoux - vocals (track 4)
- Ted Devoux - vocals (track 4)
- Louis Freese - vocals (track 6)
- Rakaa Taylor - vocals (track 12)
- Richard Stites - backing vocals (track 3)
- Dave Carlock - backing vocals (tracks: 4, 8, 12), bass (tracks: 5, 12), guitar (tracks: 5–6, 8), keyboards & synthesizer (tracks: 2–8, 12), theremin (tracks: 1, 6, 8), organ (tracks: 8, 10), producer, engineering
- Kim Jade Fry - bass (tracks: 2–3)
- Matt Freeman - bass (tracks: 5, 11)
- Gemi Taylor - guitar (track 4)
- Nic C - drum programming (track 7)
- Carlos Paugar - drum programming (track 12)
- Vic Ruggiero - Farfisa organ & Wurlitzer organ (track 6)
- Jennifer Tefft - flute (track 12)
- Dave Holden - saxophone (track 5)
- Obi Fernandez - trombone (track 5)
- Rich Graiko - trumpet (track 5)
- Scott Abels - percussion (tracks: 4, 6, 10, 12)
- Brett Reed - percussion (track 10)
- DJ Odie - scratches (tracks: 3, 11–12)
- DJ Pone - scratches (tracks: 4–5, 10)
- Billy "Jam" Kiernan - sound fx effects (track 5)
- John Silas Cranfield - assistant engineering
- Nick Ferrero - assistant engineering
- Chris Rakestraw - assistant engineering
- Alicia Simmons - assistant engineering
- Ian Suddarth - assistant engineering
- John Morrical - additional engineer, assistant engineering
- Fredrik Sarhagen - additional engineering
- Brian "Big Bass" Gardner - mastering
- Neal Harrington Pogue - mixing
- Mark Machado - artwork (logo & cover)
- Estevan Oriol - photography

== Charts ==
Album

Chart performance for Haunted Cities
Chart (2005)	Peak position
Australian Albums (ARIA)	53
French Top 200 Albums	140
UK Albums Chart	72
US Billboard 200	28

Singles

Chart performance for singles from Haunted Cities
Year	Song	Peak positions	
Year	Song	US Alternative Songs	UK Singles Chart
2005	"Gangsters and Thugs"	25	35
2005	"What I Can't Describe"	—	—
2005	"Crash and Burn"	—	—
