= Survivors Guilt: The Mixtape =

Mixtape by KennyHoopla and Travis Barker
- Released: June 11, 2021
- Genre: Pop-punk; screamo; punk rock
- Length: 20:44
- Label: Arista; Mogul Vision

KennyHoopla chronology
How Will I Rest in Peace if I'm Buried by a Highway? (2020)	Survivors Guilt: The Mixtape (2021)	Blink and You'll Miss It (2023)

Travis Barker chronology
Bloodlust (2019)	Survivors Guilt: The Mixtape (2021)	My Favorite Nightmares (2021)

Singles from Survivors Guilt: The Mixtape
- 1. "Estella" Released: November 20, 2020; 2. "Hollywood Sucks" Released: May 7, 2021

Survivors Guilt: The Mixtape (stylized uppercase) is a mixtape by KennyHoopla and Travis Barker. The mixtape was released on June 11, 2021 through Arista Records and Mogul Vision. It is the debut mixtape by KennyHoopla and Barker's second mixtape, his first since 2011's Let the Drummer Get Wicked. Two singles were released ahead of the mixtape: "Estella" and "Hollywood Sucks".

== Critical reception ==
Professional ratings
Review scores
Source	Rating
DIY	5/5 stars
NME	4/5 stars
Sputnikmusic	3.7/5

Survivor's Guilt: The Mixtape received critical acclaim from contemporary music critics upon its release. Emma Swann of DIY praised the album, giving it a full five stars out of five, saying calling the mixtape "a head-rush of a collection in the best possible way" and praising the collaborating between La'ron and Barker saying "whoever paired this duo up deserves a medal". Swann further praised Barker's drumming saying "it’s not just that the blink-182 drummer is using his not inconsiderable platform to direct rock's gaze towards the newcomer: his signature pummelling here creates the kind of pace and challenge that keeps both Kenny - and the listener - on their toes to exhilarating effect".

Ben Jolley, writing for the New Musical Express gave the mixtape a four-star rating, summarizing the album with tracks that "instantly erupt into massive arena-filling singalong anthems". And that several songs "could pass as classics from the not-so-forgotten era". In a staff review for Sputnikmusic, the review was slightly more mixed saying that it's "promising concept, the potential for him to find his own unique style even moreso. As long as he's this entertaining, though, the genre could do far worse in finding a new face than this beguiling, shape-shifting newcomer".

== Track listing ==
All music is composed by Kenneth La'ron and Travis Barker.

Survivors Guilt: The Mixtape track listing
No.	Title	Length
1.	"Silence is Also An Answer"	3:20
2.	"Estella"	1:58
3.	"Turn Back Time"	2:33
4.	"Survivors Guilt"	2:17
5.	"Hollywood Sucks"	2:32
6.	"Inside of Heaven's Mouth, There is a Sweet Tooth"	2:11
7.	"Smoke Break"	3:02
8.	"9-5 (Love Me)"	2:46
Total length:		20:44

Notes

- All tracks are stylized in lowercase and feature "//" (two forward slashes) at the end of the title.
