= Kevin Bivona =

American musician and audio engineer

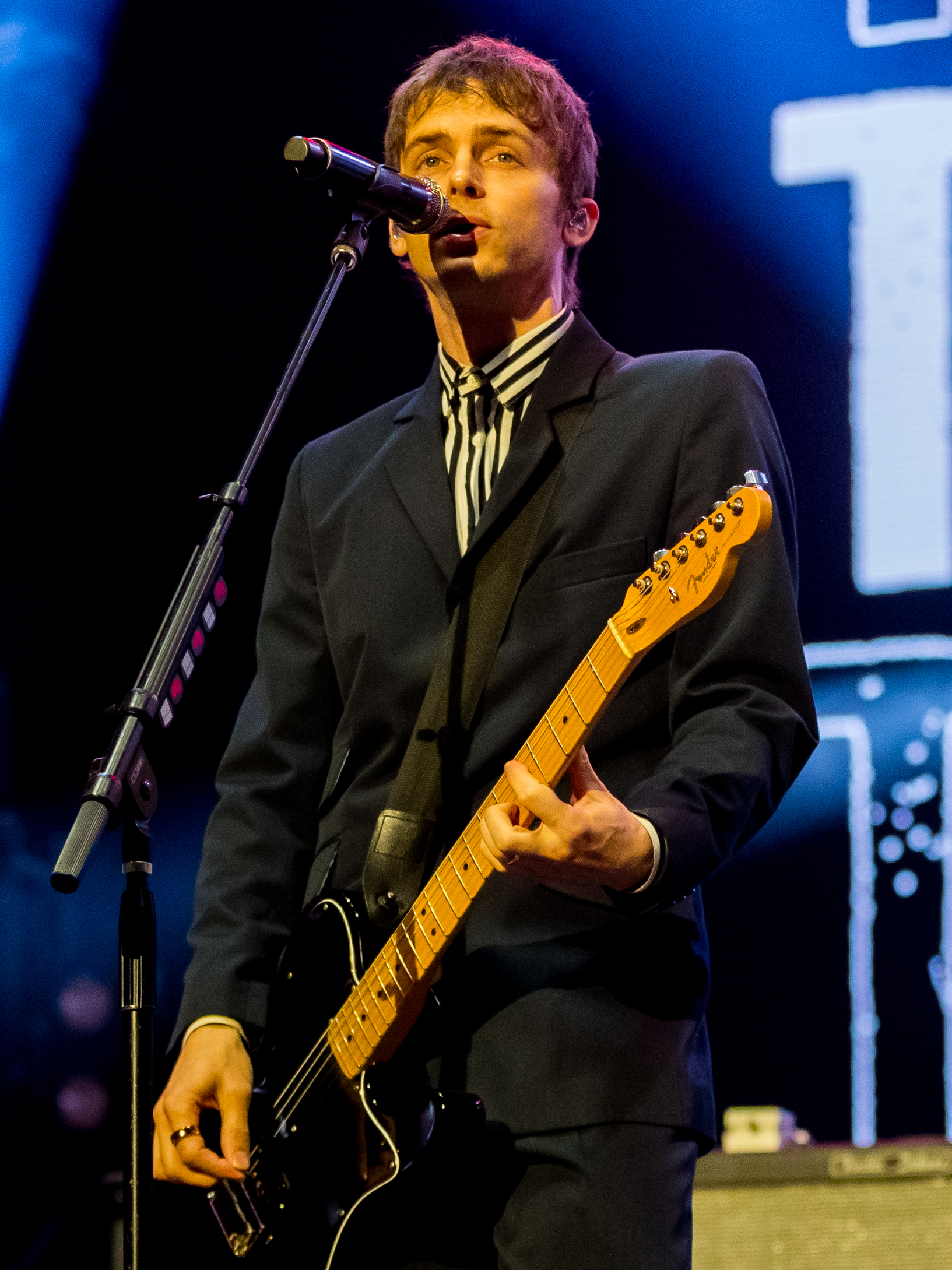

Background information
- Born: November 8, 1986 (age 39); Van Nuys, California, U.S.
- Genres: Punk rock; ska punk; street punk; hardcore punk; reggae; ska; 2-tone; country; rapcore; hip-hop
- Occupations: Musician; record producer; audio engineer
- Instruments: Guitar; bass; vocals; keyboards
- Years active: 2005–present
- Labels: Hellcat; Epitaph; Interscope
- Member of: The Transplants; The Interrupters
- Spouse: Aimee Allen

Kevin Bivona (born November 8, 1986) is an American multi-instrumentalist and audio engineer best known for his work with Tim Armstrong's various musical projects, particularly the Transplants and Rancid. He is currently the guitarist for the ska punk band the Interrupters.

== Early career ==
In 2005, Bivona became the touring keyboard player for The Transplants on the Vans Warped Tour. Following the Warped Tour, he began to work around Los Angeles as a recording engineer. This led to continued involvement with Transplants, as well as Paul Wall, Travis Barker, Dirt Nasty, The Cool Kids, and Psycho White.

== Personal life ==
Bivona is married to fellow Interrupters band member Aimee Allen. The other two members of the Interrupters are his brothers, who are twins.

== With The Transplants and studio work ==
On March 2, 2011, Bivona appeared on The Tonight Show with Jay Leno with Travis Barker and Cypress Hill, performing "The Beat Goes On" off Barker's debut solo album. On March 7, 2011, he appeared on Conan with the Transplants performing "Saturday Night" off Travis' solo record.

In 2011, he engineered and mixed the Jimmy Cliff record Rebirth produced by Tim Armstrong. Both Armstrong and Bivona were awarded the Grammy Award for "Best Reggae Album."

In 2012, Bivona and Aimee Allen co-founded the Los Angeles–based ska-punk band The Interrupters along with his brothers, twins Jesse and Justin. Their debut record was released August 5, 2014, on Hellcat Records.

== "Tim Timebomb" project ==
From October 2012 to October 2013, Bivona was heavily involved in the Tim Timebomb project, in which Rancid frontman Tim Armstrong released a song a day for a year via his website.

During the summer of 2013, the Transplants toured the US and Canada, opening for Rancid. The Rancid headlining tour was split into three legs, with the Transplants on the first two legs of the tour. For the third and final leg of the Rancid tour, the Tim Timebomb project took the Transplants' direct support spot. While Bivona played bass in Transplants, and organ, piano and guitar in Tim Timebomb, he also played organ/piano for a few Rancid songs for the extent of the tour. His band The Interrupters were opening support for the second and third legs of the tour.

== Selected discography ==
Year	Artist/band	Album	Role
2006	+44	When Your Heart Stops Beating	Keyboards, programming
2010	Paul Wall	The Heart of a Champion	Engineer
2010	Dirt Nasty	Nasty as I Wanna Be	Mixing
2010	Devils Brigade	Devils Brigade	Engineer
2011	Sublime with Rome	Yours Truly	Musician, vocals
2011	The Cool Kids	When Fish Ride Bicycles	Engineer
2011	Jimmy Cliff	Sacred Fire EP	Guitar, piano, engineer, mixing
2011	Travis Barker	Give The Drummer Some	Guitar, bass, keyboards, engineer, composer
2012	Jimmy Cliff	Rebirth (Grammy Award for Best Reggae Album)	Guitar, piano, engineer, mixing
2012	Yelawolf	Psycho White	Keyboards
2013	Transplants	In a Warzone	Bass, engineer, guitar, keyboards
2014	Various Artists	22 Jump Street soundtrack	Composer, "Live Forever"
2014	The Interrupters	The Interrupters	Guitar, vocals, songwriter, engineer
2014	Rancid	...Honor Is All We Know	Engineer, mixer
2016	The Interrupters	Say It Out Loud	Guitar, vocals, songwriter, engineer
2017	Anti-Flag	American Fall	Hammond B3
2017	Rancid	Trouble Maker	Engineer, Melodica, Piano, Hammond B3
2018	The Interrupters	Fight the Good Fight	Guitar, vocals, songwriter, engineer
2018	Madball	For The Cause	Engineer
2018	RATBOY	Internationally Unknown	Engineer, Mixer, Master
2019	Grade 2	Graveyard Island	Engineer, Mixer
2020	Machine Gun Kelly	Tickets to My Downfall	Bass, Guitar, Hammond B3, Piano, Synthesizer
2021	Lars Frederiksen	To Victory	Engineer, Vocals, Guitar, Piano, Percussion, Hammond B3
2021	The Mighty Mighty Bosstones	When God Was Great	Guitar, Piano, Organ, Background Vocals
2021	Trippie Redd & Travis Barker	Neon Shark vs Pegasus	Keyboards
2021	The Interrupters	Live In Tokyo!	Producer, Songwriter, Guitar, Vocals
2021	KennyHoopla	Survivors Guilt: The Mixtape	Keyboards
2021	Dirty Heads	Rage (Single)	Songwriter, Guitar, Keyboards, Additional Production
2021	JXDN	Tell Me About Tomorrow	Guitar, Keyboards
2021	Kris Jenner feat. Travis Barker	Jingle Bells	Piano
2022	Machine Gun Kelly	Mainstream Sellout	Additional Guitar, Keyboards
2022	The Interrupters	In The Wild	Producer, Songwriter, Guitar, Hammond Organ, Piano, Vocals
2022	Bedouin Soundclash	We Will Meet In A Hurricane	Producer, Vocals, Drums
2022	JXDN	28 (Songs For Cooper)	Keyboards, String Arrangement
2023	Blink-182	One More Time...	Synthesizers, Piano, Organ, Strings, Backing Vocals, Recording Engineer
2023	Landon Barker	Friends With Your EX	Keyboards
2024	JXDN	When The Music Stops	Keyboards
2024	Machine Gun Kelly & Jelly Roll	Lonely Road (Single)	Keyboards
2024	Kim Kardashian	Santa Baby	Keyboards, Bass
2024	Bedouin Soundclash	When The Night Feels My Song (Reimagined)	Vocals, Mixing
2024	Hot Water Music	Vows	Keyboards
2025	The Rumjacks	Dead Anthems	Mixing
2025	Mattstagraham	Yellow Paint	Production, Mixing, Keyboards, Composer
2025	Alkaline Trio	Oblivion (Single)	Keyboards
2025	Machine Gun Kelly	Lost Americana	Keyboards
2025	Yellowcard	Better Days	Keyboards
2025	The Paradox	Bender (Single)	Keyboards
2025	Crazy & The Brains	Cigarette Socialite	Production, Mixing, Keyboards
