= Give the Drummer Some =

Studio album by Travis Barker
- Released: March 15, 2011
- Recorded: 2008–2011
- Genre: Rap rock
- Length: 46:37
- Labels: LaSalle; Interscope
- Producers: Travis Barker; Pharrell Williams; RZA; Kool Kojak; Chuck Inglish; Transplants; Kid Cudi; EDIT; Corey Taylor; Steve Aoki

Travis Barker chronology
Let the Drummer Get Wicked (2011)	Give the Drummer Some (2011)	Psycho White (2012)

Singles from Give the Drummer Some
- 1. "Can a Drummer Get Some" Released: February 1, 2011

Give the Drummer Some is the debut solo studio album by American drummer Travis Barker. Barker had earlier announced that the album would be slated for a September 14, 2010 release, but was later pushed back, with the album being released on March 15, 2011. The album, released under Interscope Records, was produced by the drummer himself, alongside Pharrell Williams, RZA, Kool Kojak, Chuck Inglish, Transplants, Kid Cudi, edIT, Corey Taylor and Steve Aoki. The album debuted at number nine on the US Billboard 200 chart, with first-week sales of 28,000 copies in the United States.

== Background ==
The album title itself is a reference to a track by the Ultramagnetic MC's of the same name, which in turn derives from James Brown's "Funky Drummer." The album cover was created by Pushead. It was first announced by Barker himself that the album would be of "no one genre," indicating that the album wouldn't be based on hip hop or punk rock, unlike his previous remixes and collaborations. However, most of the tracks are hip hop and R&B influenced, though for instance "Misfits" has a techno and dance sound and "On My Own" has a metal groove to it. Guests that collaborated and are featured are: Slaughterhouse, The Cool Kids, RZA, Ludacris, Lil Wayne, Rick Ross, Game, Raekwon, Tom Morello, Slash, Steve Aoki, Busta Rhymes, Lil Jon, Pharrell, Tech N9ne, Cypress Hill, Twista, Jay Rock, Kobe, Paul Wall, Clipse, Kid Cudi, Yelawolf, Snoop Dogg, Lupe Fiasco, Swizz Beatz, and Bun B. Barker confirmed in an interview that there will not be any collaborations with Mark Hoppus and Tom Delonge from Blink-182 as he thought it would be wrong to have the first new Blink-182 song on his album, and that the song will be released separately as a single before the album is released in June–July 2011. The track listing was revealed on February 25, 2011.

== Promotion ==
The first music video released from the album was for the song "Jump Down" featuring The Cool Kids. It was directed by Nichole Ehrlich and Chris Young, and premiered on October 14, 2010, on YouTube in both normal and 3D versions. The second music video "Carry It" featuring Raekwon, RZA and Tom Morello premiered on November 2, 2010. The first official single from the album, "Can a Drummer Get Some" featuring Lil Wayne, Rick Ross, Swizz Beatz and Game, was released on February 1, 2011, though it leaked a few days earlier. Barker had performed the song live along with Game, Swizz Beatz and Mix Master Mike on Jimmy Kimmel Live! on February 10, 2011. Barker had performed the song "Saturday Night" live with Transplants, Mix Master Mike, Elvis Cortez of Left Alone and Kevin Bivona of Telacasters, on Conan on March 7, 2011. Music videos have been released for "Jump Down", "Carry It", "Could a Drummer Get Some" (remix), "Misfits", "Saturday Night", "Let's Go", and most recently "Just Chill".

== Reception ==
Professional ratings
Aggregate scores
Source	Rating
Metacritic	64/100
Review scores
Source	Rating
AllMusic	3/5 stars
Consequence	D–
HipHopDX	3.5/5
RapReviews	7/10
Rock Sound	7/10

According to the review aggregator Metacritic, Give the Drummer Some received "generally favorable reviews" based on a weighted average score of 64 out of 100 from eight critic scores.

== Track listing ==
Give the Drummer Some track listing
No.	Title	Lyrics	Music	Producer(s)	Length
1.	"Can a Drummer Get Some" (featuring Lil Wayne, Rick Ross, Swizz Beatz, and Game)	Dwayne Carter, Jr.; William Roberts II; Kasseem Dean; Jayceon Taylor	Travis Barker	Barker	3:21
2.	"If You Want To" (featuring Pharrell and Lupe Fiasco)	Pharrell Williams; Wasalu Jaco	Barker	Pharrell Williams	3:53
3.	"Carry It" (featuring RZA, Raekwon, and Tom Morello)	Robert Diggs; Corey Woods	Barker; Diggs; Morello	Barker; RZA	3:57
4.	"Knockin'" (featuring Snoop Dogg, Ludacris, E-40, and Dev)	Calvin Broadus; Christopher Bridges; Earl Stevens; Devin Tailes	Barker	Barker; Kool Kojak	4:01
5.	"Jump Down" (featuring The Cool Kids)	Antoine Reed; Evan Ingersoll	Barker	Chuck Inglish; Barker	3:07
6.	"Devil's Got a Hold" (featuring Slaughterhouse)	Joseph Budden II; Dominick Wickliffe; Joell Ortiz; Ryan Montgomery	Barker; Kevin Bivona	Barker	5:53
7.	"Let's Go" (featuring Yelawolf, Twista, Busta Rhymes, and Lil Jon)	Michael Atha; Carl Mitchell; Trevor Smith, Jr.; Jonathan Smith	Barker; Bivona	Barker	3:13
8.	"Saturday Night" (performed by the Transplants and Slash)	Rob "Skinhead Rob" Aston; Tim Armstrong	Barker; Armstrong; Slash	Barker; Aston; Armstrong	3:24
9.	"Cool Head" (featuring Kid Cudi)	Scott Mescudi	Barker; Mescudi	Barker; Kid Cudi; Edit	4:40
10.	"Raw Shit*" (featuring Tech N9ne and Bun B)	Aaron Yates; Bernard Freeman	Barker	Barker; Kool Kojak	3:19
11.	"Just Chill" (featuring Beanie Sigel, Bun B, and Kobe)	Dwight Grant; Freeman; Brian "Kobe" Honeycutt	Barker; Bivona	Barker	3:29
12.	"Beat Goes On" (featuring Cypress Hill)	Louis Freese; Senen Reyes	Barker; Bivona	Barker	4:20

Deluxe edition bonus tracks
No.	Title	Lyrics	Music	Producer(s)	Length
13.	"On My Own" (featuring Corey Taylor)	Taylor	Barker	Barker; Taylor	3:45
14.	"Don't Fuck with Me" (featuring Paul Wall, Jay Rock, and Kurupt)	Paul Slayton; Johnnie McKenzie; Ricardo Brown	Barker; Bivona	Barker	4:22
15.	"City of Dreams" (featuring Clipse and Kobe)	Gene Thornton; Terrence Thornton; Honeycutt	Barker	Barker	4:47
16.	"Misfits" (featuring Steve Aoki)	Aoki	Barker; Aoki	Barker; Aoki	9:10 *

Notes

- The actual length of the track is 4:03 + 4-minute silence + a hidden track, called "I Play The Drums". The standard version has the hidden track included after "Beat Goes On".
- The clean version of "Raw Shit" is labeled as "Raw ****".

== Personnel ==
- Steve Aoki – vocals, producer
- Tim Armstrong – vocals, guitar, producer
- Alabama Barker – vocals
- Landon Barker – vocals
- Travis Barker – bass, composer, creative director, drum programming, drums, percussions, keyboard, programming, producer
- B-Real – vocals
- DJ Marshall Barnes – turntables
- Beanie Sigel – vocals
- Kevin Bivona – bass, engineer, guitar, keyboards
- Dee Brown – assistant
- Joe Budden – vocals
- Bun B – vocals
- Andrew Coleman – engineer
- Crooked I – vocals
- Dev – vocals
- DJ Spider – turntables
- E-40 – vocals
- Edit – producer, programming
- Brian "Big Bass" Gardner – mastering
- Game – vocals
- George Gumbs – assistant, mixing assistant
- Graham Stan Hargrove – assistant
- Ryan Hunter – photography
- Chuck Inglish – vocals, producer
- James Ingram – assistant, bass, editing, guitar mixing, studio manager
- Jay Rock – vocals
- Jaysonsucks – photography
- Kev-E-Kev – turntables
- Kobe – vocals
- Kurupt – vocals
- Kid Cudi – vocals, guitar, producer
- Kool Kojak – producer
- Lil Jon – vocals
- Lil Wayne – vocals
- Ludacris – vocals
- Lupe Fiasco – vocals
- Maxx242 – art direction
- Joshua Monroy – engineer
- Tom Morello – composer, guitar
- Neal H Pogue – mixing
- Jeremiah Olvera – assistant, mixing assistant
- Joell Ortiz – vocals
- P-Mo – assistant
- Dawaun Parker – keyboards
- Paul Wall – vocals
- Pushead – cover art
- Raekwon – vocals
- Rick Ross – vocals
- Royce da 5'9" – vocals
- Mikey Rocks – vocals
- RZA – vocals, guitar, producer
- Sen Dog – vocals
- Skinhead Rob – vocals, producer
- Slash – guitar solo
- Snoop Dogg – vocals
- Swizz Beatz – vocals
- Corey Taylor – vocals, guitar, producer
- Tech N9ne – vocals
- Twista – vocals
- Pharrell Williams – vocals, producer
- Yelawolf – vocals

== Charts ==
Chart performance for Give the Drummer Some
Chart (2011)	Peak position
Australian Albums (ARIA)	68
Canadian Albums (Billboard)	17
French Albums (SNEP)	178
UK Albums (OCC)	160
US Billboard 200	9
US Top R&B/Hip-Hop Albums	2
US Top Rap Albums	2
