= Let the Drummer Get Wicked =

Mixtape by Travis Barker
- Released: February 21, 2011
- Recorded: 2011
- Genre: Rap rock
- Length: 58:24
- Label: Interscope, XXL
- Producer: Travis Barker

Travis Barker chronology
Let the Drummer Get Wicked (2011)	Give the Drummer Some (2011)

Let the Drummer Get Wicked is a mixtape by Travis Barker. It is hosted by DJ Whoo Kid. It was released on February 21, 2011.

== Background ==
This mixtape was released in promotion of his album, Give the Drummer Some.

== Track listing ==
No.	Title	Producer(s)	Length
1.	"Can a Drummer Get Some?" (featuring Swizz Beatz, Game, Lil Wayne & Rick Ross)	Travis Barker	3:22
2.	"Come N Get It" (Clipse)	Pharrell & Travis Barker	2:41
3.	"Never Holding Me Back" (J. Cole featuring Travis Barker)	Travis Barker	2:12
4.	"Detroit" (Royce da 5'9")	Havoc & Travis Barker	4:23
5.	"Joaquin Phoenix" (Lupe Fiasco featuring Travis Barker)	Travis Barker	2:48
6.	"Perfect Match" (Lloyd Banks featuring Fabolous & Travis Barker)	Travis Barker	3:33
7.	"Ol' Dirty Bastard" (skit)		0:14
8.	"Nymphomaniac" (Wyclef Jean featuring Jim Jones)	The Haitian Super Heroes & Travis Barker	3:58
9.	"Champagne" (Wiz Khalifa featuring Travis Barker)	Travis Barker	3:37
10.	"H.A.M." (Travis Barker Remix) (Kanye West & Jay-Z)	Lex Luger & Travis Barker	4:24
11.	"Me Against the World" (Tony Yayo)	Cookin' Soul & Travis Barker	2:41
12.	"Something" (Big K.R.I.T. featuring Travis Barker)	Travis Barker	4:04
13.	"My Homeboyz" (Waka Flocka Flame featuring Travis Barker)	Travis Barker	1:50
14.	"Hard Liquor" (Tech N9ne's freestyle)	Dr. Dre & Travis Barker	4:01
15.	"Drum Roll Please" (Killa Kyleon)	Travis Barker	2:11
16.	"Snap" (Too $hort)	Travis Barker	3:32
17.	"Big Nut Bust" (Big Sean featuring Travis Barker)	Travis Barker	2:52
18.	"Hard Shit" (Three 6 Mafia)	Travis Barker	1:40
19.	"Napalm" (Xzibit)	Travis Barker	4:13
