= Transplants (album) =

Studio album by Transplants
- Released: October 21, 2002(EU); October 22, 2002(US)
- Recorded: January 2000–June 2002
- Studio: Tim Armstrong's Basement (Los Angeles, CA)
- Genre: Rapcore; alternative hip hop
- Length: 45:21
- Label: Hellcat
- Producer: Tim Armstrong; Dave Carlock

Transplants chronology
Transplants (2002)	Haunted Cities (2005)

Singles from Transplants
- 1. "Diamonds and Guns"/"Tall Cans in the Air" Released: October 15, 2002; 2. "D.J. D.J." Released: March 10, 2003

Professional ratings
Review scores
Source	Rating
AllMusic	4/5 stars
The Fader	(favorable)
Los Angeles Times	2/4 stars
Punknews.org	4.5/5 stars
Robert Christgau	A

Transplants is the debut studio album by the American punk rock/hip hop band Transplants. It was released on October 22, 2002, via Hellcat Records. Audio production of the twelve-track record was handled by Tim Armstrong and Dave Carlock. Rancid's Matt Freeman and Lars Frederiksen, The Slackers' Vic Ruggiero, The Distillers' Brody Dalle, AFI's Davey Havok, Funkdoobiest's Son Doobie, The Nerve Agents' Eric Ozenne, and Skarhead's Danny Diablo made their appearances on the album as additional musicians and vocalists.

The album peaked at No. 96 on the Billboard 200 and No. 1 on the Independent Albums chart. Its lead single, "Diamonds and Guns", peaked at No. 19 on the Modern Rock Tracks chart, No. 27 on the UK Singles Chart, and was most played as background music in older Garnier Fructis TV commercials. The second single of the album, "D.J. D.J." peaked at #49 on the UK Singles Chart. Both its singles are featured in Paul Hunter's 2003 film Bulletproof Monk. The song "California Babylon" is included in the 2003 video game Tony Hawk's Underground.

== Track listings ==
All music is composed by Tim Armstrong, Rob Aston and Travis Barker.

No.	Title	Writer(s)	Length
1.	"Romper Stomper"	T. Armstrong; R. Aston; E. Ozenne	3:18
2.	"Tall Cans in the Air"	T. Armstrong; R. Aston	3:43
3.	"D.J. D.J."	T. Armstrong; R. Aston	4:01
4.	"Diamonds and Guns"	T. Armstrong; R. Aston; J. Vasquez	4:01
5.	"Quick Death"	T. Armstrong; R. Aston; D. Havok	3:36
6.	"Sad But True"	T. Armstrong; R. Aston	4:26
7.	"Weigh on My Mind"	T. Armstrong; R. Aston	3:22
8.	"One Seventeen"	T. Armstrong; R. Aston	2:01
9.	"California Babylon"	T. Armstrong; R. Aston	4:05
10.	"We Trusted You"	T. Armstrong; R. Aston	4:35
11.	"D.R.E.A.M. (Drugs Rule Everything Around Me)"	T. Armstrong; R. Aston; D. Singer	4:42
12.	"Down in Oakland"	T. Armstrong; R. Aston	3:22
Total length:			48:55

== Personnel ==
- Tim Armstrong - vocals (tracks: 2–4, 6–10, 12), guitar, bass (tracks: 4–5, 7–9, 12), synthesizer (tracks: 1, 5), percussion (track 6, 10), loops, producer, mixing
- Rob "Skinhead Rob" Aston - vocals (tracks: 1–11), scratches (tracks: 3–4, 11)
- Travis Barker - drums
- Eric Ozenne - vocals (track 1)
- Son Doobie - vocals (track 4)
- Davey Havok - vocals (track 5)
- Brody Dalle - vocals (tracks: 2, 7)
- Danny Diablo - vocals (track 11)
- Dave Carlock - backing vocals (tracks: 3–4, 6), guitar (track 11), bass (tracks: 1, 6, 11), piano (track 4), synthesizer (tracks: 1–3, 6–7, 9, 11–12), producer, mixing
- Lars Frederiksen - backing vocals (track 10)
- Matt Freeman - bass (track 2)
- Victor Ruggiero - piano (tracks: 9–10, 12), Hammond B-3 organ (tracks: 2, 6–7, 9, 10, 12)
- Gene Grimaldi - mastering
- Estavan Oriol - photography, artwork & design
- Mark Machado - artwork & design
- Eklipsone - artwork & design

== Charts ==
Album

Chart (2002)	Peak position
US Billboard 200	96
US Billboard Independent Albums	1

Singles

Year	Song	Peak positions	
Year	Song	US Mod Rock	UK Singles Chart
2003	"Diamonds and Guns"	19	27
2003	"D.J. D.J."	—	49
