= Left Alone =

American punk rock band

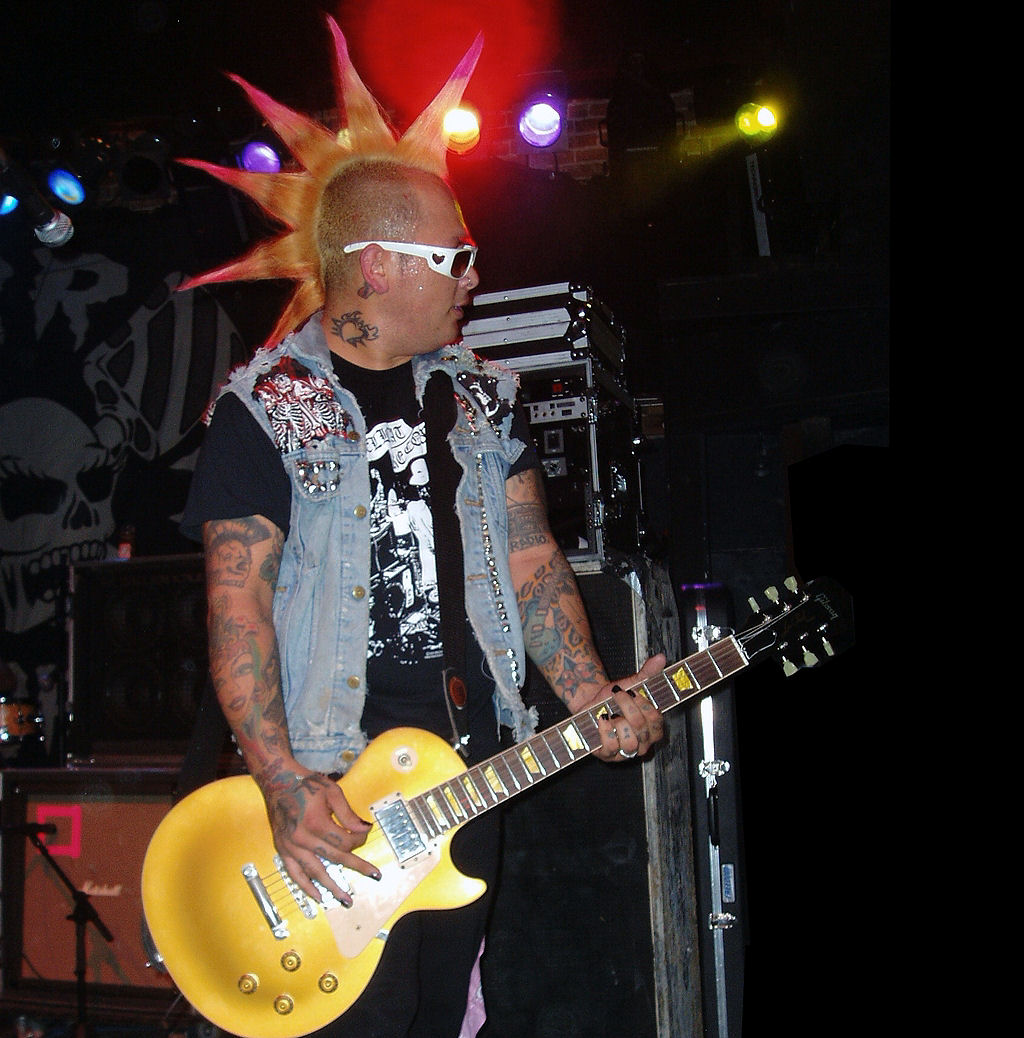
- Elvis Cortez performing with Left Alone in Fort Collins, CO, May 2006.

Background information
- Origin: Wilmington, Los Angeles, California
- Genres: Punk rock; pop punk; street punk; ska punk
- Years active: 1996–present
- Labels: Smelvis, Hellcat
- Members: Elvis Cortez; Jimmy Jam; Ben Shaw
- Past members: Jonathan "Be@t$" Contreras

Left Alone is a punk rock band from Wilmington, California. They were formed in May 1996 by lead vocalist and guitarist Elvis Cortez. Cortez formed his own label, Smelvis Records, to release Left Alone's records, and has since expanded the label to include numerous other underground bands. Cortez was also the owner of the PCH Club in Wilmington, which is now defunct. Left Alone's music has ska influences, and the band is notable for adhering to a do it yourself ethic by avoiding major labels, booking their own tours, and making their own merchandise.

After releasing numerous demos, splits, and EPs, Left Alone released their first full-length, Streets of Wilmington, in 2002. A year later, the band compiled their earlier, out-of-print recordings on the anthology Left Alone: 1996–2000. In 2003, Cortez went on the Warped Tour as a roadie for the band Destruction Made Simple. After a few weeks of doing nothing as a roadie other than promoting his own band, Elvis was forced to return to LA because his dogs needed surgery. After Warped Tour founder Kevin Lyman heard Left Alone's music, he chose the band to be the Warped Tour BBQ band for the 2004 tour. The band were invited back to be the BBQ band for the 2005 tour. While on the Warped Tour, Tim Armstrong of Rancid heard Left Alone's 2004 album, Lonely Starts & Broken Hearts. Armstrong signed the band to his label, Hellcat Records, and re-released Lonely Starts & Broken Hearts. The band released their third full-length album, Dead American Radio, on August 8, 2006, which features guest appearances from Tim Armstrong and Patricia Day of the Horrorpops.

The band released their self-titled album on April 7, 2009.

They were touring with the Vans Warped Tour 2010.

Since 2011, Elvis Cortez has been a touring member of Tim Armstrong's band Transplants.

== Band members ==
- Elvis Cortez – lead vocals, guitar
- Jimmy Jam – Bass
- Ben Shaw – Drums
- Pablo Fiasco - Organ

== Former members ==
- Nick Danger – Bass
- Wallace Tenenbaum! – Bass
- Ruben Medina – Bass, Vocals
- Salvador Ibarra, Jr. – Drums
- Lawrence Sanchez – Saxophone
- Alfredo Quinonez – Trumpet
- German Castellanos – Trombone
- Ramrod – Drums
- Jonathan "Be@t$" Contreras – Drums
- Billy Lopez – Drums
- Ricardo Cruz- Bass
- Armando Garduño-Guitar

== Discography ==
=== Studio albums ===
- Streets of Wilmington, Smelvis Records, 2002
- Left Alone: 1996–2000, Smelvis Records, 2003
- Lonely Starts & Broken Hearts, Smelvis Records, 2004
- Lonely Starts & Broken Hearts (re-release), Hellcat Records, 2005
- Dead American Radio, Hellcat Records, 2006 (vinyl release by Durty Mick Records, 2007)
- Streets Of Wilmington, (remastered w/bonus tracks, vinyl only), Blackbird Music, 2009
- Left Alone, Hellcat Records, 2009 (vinyl release by Blackbird Music, 2009)
- Harbor Area, Hellcat Records/Smelvis Records, 2014
- Checkers & Plaid, Smelvis Records, 2021

=== EPs ===
- Live at the Roxy, Smelvis Records, 1997
- Stranded Again, Counterfeit Records, 1998
- My Mistake, Smelvis Records, 2000
- Anything for the Kids, Smelvis Records, 2004
- Hate the Day, Hellcat/Smelvis Records, 2013

=== Compilations/Splits ===
- Left Alone/Snap Her Split, One Shot Records, 2001
- Voodoo Glow Skulls/Left Alone Split, Smelvis Records, 2004
- Left Alone/Mastema Split 7" (limited edition colored vinyl release) Smelvis Records No. 20, 2005
- Left Alone/Far From Finished Split, Do Tell Records, 2005
- Left Alone/Deadly Sins Split 7" (vinyl release) Durty Mick Records, 2008
- Left Alone/Potato Pirates 7" (vinyl release) Smelvis Records, 2011
- Left Alone/Argyle Street Split 7" (vinyl release) Smelvis Records, 2011
- Left Alone/China Wife Motors Split 7" (vinyl release) Smelvis Records, 2011
- Left Alone/Peaceable Jones Split 7" (vinyl release) Smelvis Records, 2011
- Hooligans United a Tribute to Rancid, Smelvis Records, 2015
- Manic Hispanic/Left Alone Split 7" (vinyl release) Smelvis Records, 2016
- Rare and Unreleased Tracks 2016

=== Singles ===
- The Question, Smelvis Records, 2001
- Wilmington, CA, Smelvis Records, 2002
- Lonely Ride (acoustic demo), Smelvis Records, 2002

=== Music videos ===
- "4 Weeks"
- "Every Night"
- "I Hate Emo"
- "Would You Stay Now"
- "Sad Story"
- "Broken Promise"
- "Leather Bound Book"
- "Black Derby Jacket"
