= Expensive Taste =

American hip hop group

Expen$ive Taste
- Origin: Los Angeles, California / Houston, Texas
- Genres: Hip hop
- Years active: 2005–2010
- Labels: LaSalle (2006), Swishahouse/Hellcat (2009–2010)
- Past members: Paul Wall; Skinhead Rob; Travis Barker
- Website: expensivetaste.net

Expensive Taste (styled as Expen$ive Taste) was an American hip hop super-group formed by Paul Wall, Skinhead Rob (Transplants), and Travis Barker (The Aquabats, Blink-182, Box Car Racer, +44 and Transplants). Expensive Taste released a 15-track mixtape for free from a newly registered website. Travis Barker said on his Twitter blog that two new songs would be available soon on iTunes. Two songs by Expensive Taste appeared on Paul Wall's album, Heart of a Champion.

== Discography ==
A 15-track Expen$ive Taste mixtape was released for a free download if signed up for SkeeTV, and also available at merchandise booths on the Honda Civic Tour. It is also now available at Paul Wall's official website, www.grillsbypaulwall.com.

Track list From DJ Skee Presents: Expen$ive Taste - Expen$ive Taste

1. "Famous Anthem" (featuring B-Real, Too Short, Damu, and Eddie Rap Life)
2. "Can't Fuck With It"
3. "Trunk Full of Boom"
4. "I'm the Shit"
5. "Them Are G's On That Bitch"
6. "Smokin' Kush Blunts" (Warfare: Skinhead Rob and Damu)
7. "Everyday" (featuring Slim Thug)
8. "We Some Go Getters" (featuring Lil Spank Booty and Damu)
9. "Powder and the Dank" (featuring Milano)
10. "You Know Me" (featuring Bun B)
11. "Gun Play" (featuring Damu)
12. "Back Down Memory Lane" (Boo Yaa Tribe)
13. "Motherfuckin' Fool"
14. "They Don't Want It" (Warfare: Skinhead Rob and Damu)
15. "Famous Anthem" (Remix) (featuring Ca$his, Hayes, Lil Spank Booty, Mitchy Slick, Krondon, and Chace Infinite)

== Songs ==
- "Slidin' On That Oil" (featuring Unique of the Grit Boys)
- "My Medicine"
- "Hold Up"
- "Stars Wit Straps" (Remix)
- "Feel Good" (featuring Nump)
- "Pop One of These" (featuring Too Short and The Federation)
- "Pop One of These" (New Version featuring Lil Jon, Too Short and The Federation) (produced by Lil Jon)
- "Expensive Taste"
- "Heart of a Hustler"
- "Not My Friend" (featuring Slim Thug)
