= LaSalle Records =

American record label

- Industry: Record label
- Genre: Various
- Founded: 2004
- Founder: Travis Barker
- Defunct: 2018
- Fate: Closed
- Successor: DTA Records
- Headquarters: Corona, California, U.S.
- Parent: Atlantic Records (formerly)

LaSalle Records was an American record label and a former division of Atlantic Records.

== History ==
The record label was founded in 2004 and was owned by musician Travis Barker. The label is located in Corona, California. Most of the bands currently signed to LaSalle are gone and have moved on to other labels, although Barker has said, "I'll sign anything from punk to hip hop to country to speed metal—I don't give a fuck as long as it's good."

The first band signed to the label in 2004 was The Kinison; their debut album, What Are You Listening To?, was the first album released by the label). The Nervous Return and Barker's own band, Transplants, also signed.

In 2011, when thought defunct, LaSalle Records was co-assisted with Travis Barker's (also owner of LaSalle records) new album Give The Drummer Some with head company Interscope records.

In 2015, La Salle signed Prayers, the San Diego cholo-goth duo. La Salle Released Prayers' 3rd EP, "Young Gods" on June 23, 2015. The project includes Travis Barker on drums, and features Skinhead Rob and DJ Klever on individual tracks. At the CD release show for the album, Barker played drums on 4 songs, and Skinhead Rob performed a song. The show at the Roxy sold out. The EP reached #11 on the iTunes electronic charts on the first day of its release.

LaSalle Records is currently inactive, but the label's catalogue is still available digitally, and distributed by The Orchard.

== LaSalle alumni ==
Artists who have recorded for LaSalle include:

- Transplants (2004–2005)
- Travis Barker (2004-2018)
- Prayers (2015)
- The Kinison (2004–2005)
- The Nervous Return (2004–2006)
- Expensive Taste (2005–2006)
- TRV$DJAM (2008–2009)

== See also ==
- List of record labels
