= Transplants (band) =

American rap/rock group

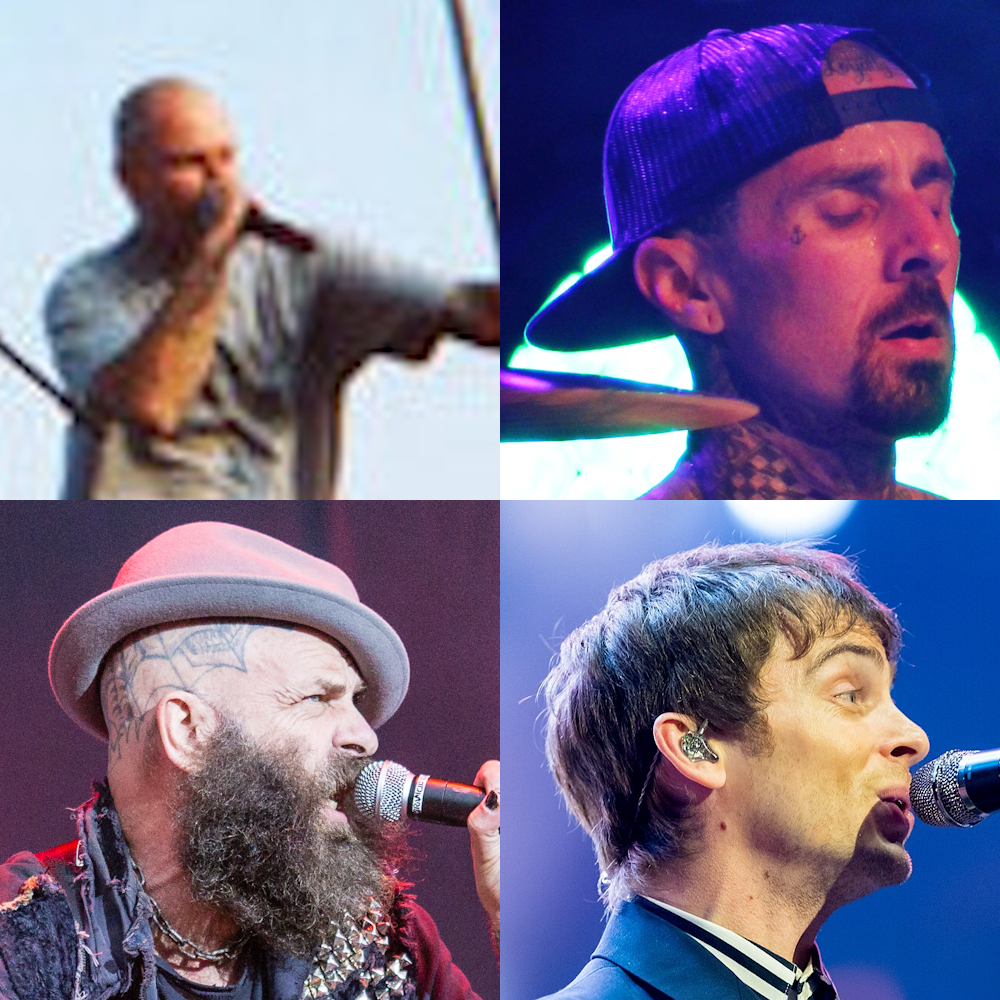
- Collage of the four members of The Transplants: (clockwise from top-left) Skinhead Rob, Travis Barker, Kevin Bivona, Tim Armstrong.

Background information
- Origin: Los Angeles, California, United States
- Genres: Rap rock, punk rock
- Works: Transplants discography
- Years active: 1999–2003; 2004–2006; 2010–present
- Labels: Hellcat; Atlantic
- Members: Tim Armstrong; Rob Aston; Travis Barker; Kevin Bivona
- Website: thetransplants.com

The Transplants are an American punk rock and rap rock supergroup. They formed in 1999 when Tim Armstrong (of the bands Rancid and Operation Ivy) played his friend and roadie Rob Aston some beats he had made using Pro Tools and asked Aston if he would consider contributing lyrics. Initially, Armstrong played all the instruments himself, but as the project grew, he invited musician friends such as Matt Freeman (Operation Ivy, Rancid), Lars Frederiksen (Rancid), and Vic Ruggiero (The Slackers) to add to the sound. Before long, Armstrong and Aston decided to officially form a band, but to make things complete, they wanted a drummer, so Travis Barker from Blink-182 was asked to join in 2002. DJ Odie and DJ Pone were instrumental in the album Haunted Cities.

After the release of their first album, Transplants briefly disbanded in 2003, due to all members being involved in their own projects, including Rancid and Blink-182. Then in 2004, they reunited to record their second album (Haunted Cities) before going on hiatus again until 2010 when the band started to record new material. This new material was released as In a Warzone in 2013.

== History ==
=== Transplants and first hiatus (2002–2003) ===
After two years of recording, Transplants released their debut album Transplants on Hellcat Records in October 2002. In the end, the album was recorded and mixed entirely in Armstrong's basement. Special guest vocalists included Eric Ozenne (The Nerve Agents), Davey Havok (AFI), Son Doobie (Funkdoobiest), Danny Diablo (Crown of Thornz, AKA Lord Ezec), Lars Frederiksen (Rancid) and Brody Dalle (The Distillers, ex-wife of Armstrong), who sings on the track "Weigh on My Mind".

The singles "Diamonds And Guns" and "D.J. D.J." quickly became MTV favorites and earned the band critical and commercial success. "Diamonds and Guns" and its unmistakable piano hook played by co-producer Dave Carlock was featured in TV commercials for Garnier Fructis shampoo and Neutrogena, and both this and the song "Tall Cans in the Air" were featured on the soundtrack for the 2003 movie Bulletproof Monk.

By 2003, the band had temporarily disbanded, while Barker worked on then-upcoming Blink-182 album, and Armstrong worked on Rancid's Indestructible.

=== Haunted Cities (2004–2005) ===
In 2004, during an extensive Rancid hiatus, Armstrong decided to bring Transplants back together. The band's second album, titled Haunted Cities, was released in June 2005, just four months after Barker's former band Blink-182 announced their hiatus.

The album's first single, "Gangsters and Thugs" was a hit and the band began touring on the 2005 Warped Tour. After the Warped Tour, Transplants started to plan a large North American tour with Pennywise and wanted to release a second single. The band shot and released another video for the single "What I Can't Describe". The band released the Chopped and screwed version of Haunted Cities on November 1, 2005.

Soon after the cancellation of the tour, two band members announced several more side projects that they would be embarking on during Transplants break. Barker revealed that he would be starting a tour with DJ AM and also a new band with Aston and DJ Paul Wall which would become Expensive Taste. Aston revealed that he was working on a solo album.

=== Second hiatus (2006–2010) ===
In an interview with Aston and Paul Wall on January 16, 2006 about their project, Expensive Taste, Aston stated "The Warped Tour had just ended and Transplants had just broken up". This led to some confusion over whether the band had officially broken up, or not. Despite the statement made by Aston about how the band had "broken up", frontman Tim Armstrong contradicted this statement on a MySpace bulletin. He stated: "In the upcoming years, I hope to make another Transplants album. I love recording with those guys".

From 2006 to 2009, Transplants had been "on hold", as all the members had continued working on their own projects. Armstrong was busy touring with Rancid promoting their new album, Let the Dominoes Fall. He also released his solo album, A Poet's Life, in 2007. Travis Barker worked on an album with a recently reformed Blink-182, who toured during the summer of 2009, and also formed a new band called Expensive Taste, along with Aston.

=== Second reunion (2010–present) ===
In January 2010, Barker announced on his Twitter account that Transplants were reunited and are in fact recording new material in 2010. The band announced that their new website will be posted in February 2011. It was also announced that the third album will be released on the band's original home at Hellcat Records.

Armstrong and Aston appeared as guests on Barker's first solo album Give the Drummer Some along with former Guns N' Roses guitarist Slash on a Latin rock influenced song called "Saturday Night". The band performed the song live on Conan March 7, 2011, with Mix Master Mike on turntables, Elvis Cortez on guitar and Kevin Bivona on bass. Slash did not take part in the performance.

In an interview with 29-95 in April 2011, Barker has revealed that material for the Transplants album has been written since August 2010, and that 16 songs were already written by Armstrong, Aston and Barker for the album. He has also said that he expects around 30 songs to be written, with the best 12 to 15 making the cut.

On November 13, 2011, an announcement was made from the band's official Facebook page that they will be finishing up their new album in December. On November 29, Armstrong revealed that the album is slated for a spring 2012 release date, which will be followed by a new Rancid album in that summer.

On December 16, 2011, Aston posted a photo on Facebook revealing Kevin "Sweatshop" Bivona as the newest member.

After assorted announcements during 2012, the third album, titled In a Warzone, was finally released June 25, 2013. The first single, "In a Warzone", came out April 2, 2013; a second single, "Come Around", was released the following week on April 9.

On February 28, 2014, it was revealed on the band's official Facebook page, that the band had begun writing and recording new material.

On April 28, 2015, Barker announced that Transplants were almost finished with the recording of several cover songs. He released a list with song titles including songs by bands like Circle Jerks, Unwritten Law, Cypress Hill, Minor Threat, Beastie Boys, House of Pain, and Sepultura. On January 19, 2017, Barker confirmed that Transplants would be releasing a covers album.

On June 6, 2017, the band posted "Friday the 13th. October 2017." on their Facebook page, which led to rumors this would be the date for the release of the announced record. On July 29, 2017, the band announced on their Facebook page that the new record would be released on October 13 2017 and it would be an EP named Take Cover. The announcement was repeated on September 22. On October 6, 2017, Transplants announced the track list for Take Cover. The EP would consist of 7 songs.

The EP Take Cover was released as planned on October 13, 2017.

== Band members ==
- Tim Armstrong – lead vocals, lead guitar (1999–present)
- Skinhead Rob – lead vocals (1999–present)
- Travis Barker – drums, percussion, loops (2002–present)
- Kevin Bivona – bass guitar (2011–present); keyboards (2005 touring, 2011–present)

Touring members

- Elvis Cortez – rhythm guitar (2011–present)

Former touring members

- Dave Carlock – keyboards, samples (2003)
- Craig Fairbaugh – rhythm guitar (2003–2005)
- Matt Freeman – bass guitar (2003–2005)
- DJ Pone – turntables (2003–2005)

== Discography ==
Studio albums

- Transplants (2002)
- Haunted Cities (2005)
- In a Warzone (2013)
