= Darker My Love =

American psychedelic rock band (2004–2010)

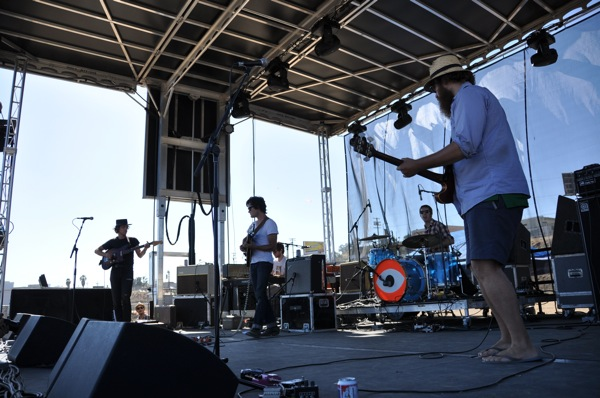
- Darker My Love - Live in Concert 2009

Background information
- Origin: Los Angeles, California, US
- Genres: Indie rock, shoegaze, psychedelic rock
- Years active: 2004–2010
- Labels: Dangerbird, Tarantulas
- Past members: Tim Presley; Andy Granelli; Rob Barbato; Jared Everett; Will Canzoneri; Dan Allaire
- Website: Darker My Dudes Blog

Darker My Love was a psychedelic rock band based in Los Angeles, California. Guitarist/vocalist Tim Presley, a former member of the hardcore punk band the Nerve Agents, formed the band in 2004 with drummer and former Nerve Agents bandmate Andy Granelli, then also of the Distillers. They were joined shortly thereafter by bass guitarist Rob Barbato, who shared songwriting and vocals with Presley, and rhythm guitarist Jared "The Sandwich" Everett. Will Canzoneri joined the band on organ and clavinet in the latter half of 2006. The band released three LPs and one EP. Presley is also a visual artist responsible for much of the band's imagery.

The band's name was derived from a T.S.O.L. song of the same name.

== History ==
Originally signed to Tarantulas Records, Darker My Love released its first EP in 2004. Their first LP, recorded in 2005, was released on August 22, 2006, on Dangerbird Records. In spring 2006, Presley and Barbato became members of the prolific British post-punk group the Fall, and both are prominent on the Fall's 2007 album Reformation Post TLC. On August 28, 2007, the band released a 12-inch 45 rpm split record with Denver-based rock group Moccasin, contributing the song "Hair Decisions". The record was the first release on the Los Angeles label I Hate Rock N Roll.

The second Darker My Love album, 2, was released on Dangerbird Records on August 5, 2008. Several songs from the album gained prominence through licensing in television, commercials and video games; "Blue Day" is used on Guitar Hero 5 and NHL 2K10, "Waves" is used in Midnight Club: Los Angeles, and "Two Ways Out" is used in MLB 09: The Show and Tony Hawk: Ride.

In 2009, Granelli left the band and was replaced by a rotating cast of drummers until the band eventually settled on longtime Brian Jonestown Massacre drummer Dan Allaire. That year, they released another split record on I Hate Rock N Roll, this time a 7" with Audacity.

The band's third LP, recorded in Northern California in January 2010 and entitled Alive As You Are, was released on July 26, 2010, in the UK and August 17, 2010, in North America.

Darker My Love toured with acts including the Distillers, Heavens, the Warlocks, Asobi Seksu, the Dandy Warhols, the Strange Boys, A Place To Bury Strangers, White Lies, Band of Horses and Delta Spirit.

Presley has released numerous LPs under the name White Fence, beginning with a release titled White Fence in February 2010. It was followed in 2011 by Is Growing Faith, Family Perfume Vol. 1 and Family Perfume Vol. 2 in 2012, Cyclops Reap in 2013, and For the Recently Found Innocent in 2014. He also released a 2012 collaboration with Ty Segall entitled Hair, a self-titled LP under the name W-X in 2015, and a 2016 Tim Presley LP entitled The WiNK. Presley co-founded DRINKS with Cate Le Bon, releasing Hermits on Holiday in 2015.

== Members ==
- Tim Presley – guitar/vocals (2004–2010)
- Andy Granelli – drums (2004–2009)
- Rob Barbato – bass/vocals (2004–2010)
- Jared Everett – guitar (2004–2010)
- Will Canzoneri – organ/clavinet (2006–2010)
- Dan Allaire – drums (2009–2010)

== Discography ==
=== EPs ===
- Darker My Love EP (2004, Tarantulas Records)

=== Albums ===
- Darker My Love (2006, Dangerbird Records)
- 2 (2008, Dangerbird Records)
- Alive As You Are (2010, Dangerbird Records)

=== Splits ===
- Darker My Love/Moccasin Split 12" (2007, I Hate Rock N Roll Records)
- Darker My Love/Audacity Split 7" (2009, I Hate Rock N Roll Records)

=== Singles ===
- "Summer Is Here" (2005)
- "Two Ways Out" (2008)
- "Blue Day" (2009)

== See also ==
- The Distillers
- The Nerve Agents
- The Fall
- White Fence
