= Andy Granelli =

American drummer

- Also known as: Andy Outbreak
- Born: U.S.
- Genres: Punk rock
- Instrument: drums

Andy Granelli (aka Andy Outbreak) is an American drummer. He first appeared with a band known as Model American in 1997 on their self-titled album. The same album later resurfaced in 2002 under the moniker MAPS, which stood for "Model American Playing Secretly", after the band was forced to change the name by a court of law. Following this, Granelli had success as the drummer of the hardcore band The Nerve Agents, appearing on all four of their releases, including the band's Hellcat Records debut The Butterfly Collection.

In 2002 he became the drummer of the punk band The Distillers, which was at that time a label mate of The Nerve Agents. He replaced Mat Young after the release of The Distillers' self-titled album and went on to appear on the group's second album Sing Sing Death House. Following the success of this album he went on to record on The Distillers' third album, the major label debut Coral Fang in 2003. After The Distillers went on hiatus, he left the band in March 2005 to pursue his other band, Darker My Love, with former Model American band member Tim Presley. Presley was also responsible for the original Coral Fang artwork, which was banned by many large American retailers.

== Discography ==
- The Nerve Agents (EP) - The Nerve Agents (1998)
- The Nerve Agents/Kill Your Idols split - The Nerve Agents (2000)
- The Way It Should Be... compilation - The Nerve Agents (2000)
- Days Of The White Owl - The Nerve Agents (2000)
- The Butterfly Collection - The Nerve Agents (2001)
- Sing Sing Death House - The Distillers (2002)
- Coral Fang - The Distillers (2003)
- Darker My Love - Darker My Love (2006)
- 2 - Darker My Love (2008)
