= The Butterfly Collection =

Studio album by The Nerve Agents
- Released: July 24, 2001
- Recorded: 2001
- Studio: Art Of Ears, Hayward, California, U.S.
- Genre: Hardcore punk
- Length: 38:34 total 29:35 music
- Label: Hellcat Records
- Producer: The Nerve Agents; Andy Ernst

The Nerve Agents chronology
Days Of The White Owl (2000)	The Butterfly Collection (2001)

Professional ratings
Review scores
Source	Rating
Punknews	4.5/5 stars
Allmusic	2.5/5 stars

The Butterfly Collection is the second and final full-length album from Californian hardcore punk band The Nerve Agents.

It was released by Hellcat Records and distributed by Epitaph Records in July 2001.

== Overview ==
After the straightforward hardcore punk of the debut EP and the quirky melodies of Days of the White Owl, this album has more angular riffs and off-the-wall melodies and has slowed down considerably on most tracks.

Songs are still sub-two minute affairs and Eric Ozenne's vocals are the same as they have ever been – manic yell/growls.

The album had its fans – they liked the musical progression and direction it was going – and it had its detractors – – mostly still citing lack of originality within the Californian hardcore scene.

Fans of the band in general, however, are quick to point out that Eric Ozenne has always been in bands that have played the same sort of music and, in fact, were at the forefront of the scene in the mid-1990s with his previous band, Redemption 87.

== Track listing ==
- All lyrics written by Eric Ozenne, music written by The Nerve Agents, unless stated
1. "The Poisoning" – 2:21
2. "Crisis" – 1:18
3. "War Against!" – 2:23
4. "The Vice of Mrs. Grossly" – 1:55
5. "Madam Butterfly" – 1:42
6. "Princess Jasmine of Tinseltown" – 2:31
7. "What Then?" – 1:53
8. "The Legend of H. Gane Ciro" – 2:05
9. "But I Might Die Tonight" (Yusuf Islam) – 1:45
10. "Metal Pig" – 1:37
11. "New Jersey" – 1:34
12. "So, Very Avoidable" – 1:11
13. "Oh, Ghost of Mine" – 1:42
14. "Frost" – 2:27
15. "The Cross" – 12:09
- Track 15, a piano instrumental, is actually only approx 3:10 but is followed by silence and then ghostly sounds until the end

== Credits ==
- Eric Ozenne – vocals
- Tim "Timmy Stardust" Presley – guitar
- Zac "The Butcher" Hunter – guitar
- Dante Sigona – bass, piano
- Andy "Outbreak" Granelli – drums
- Jade Puget and Zane Morris – backing vocals on "But I Might Die Tonight"
- Recorded, mixed and mastered In The Year Of The Snake at Art Of Ears, Hayward, California, USA
- Produced by The Nerve Agents and Andy Ernst
- Engineered by Andy Ernst

== See also ==
- Redemption 87's album, All Guns Poolside – Eric Ozenne's previous band
