= Dave Carlock =

- Born: David Walter Carlock
- Genres: Hard rock, funk rock, album rock, punk rock, blue-eyed soul, pop rock
- Occupations: Singer-songwriter, multi-instrumentalist, record producer, arranger
- Instruments: Vocals, guitar, bass, drums, keyboards, synthesizer, percussion, piano
- Years active: 1985–present
- Website: www.davecarlock.com

David Walter Carlock is an American record producer, songwriter and multi-instrumentalist.

His production style has been described as very hands on and song oriented. He received a Grammy Award for engineering Pink's, "Trouble".

== Biography ==
=== Early life ===
Carlock was born in St. Joseph, Michigan, the son of Jane (née Hadley), and Nelson Carlock. He discovered his love of music by singing in front of restaurant jukeboxes at the age of four.

In junior high school, he taught himself guitar, bass, and keyboards. After graduating from St. Joseph High School, Carlock was an engineer at local recording studios, produced bands, and did string arrangements for a 60-piece symphony.

He attended Western Michigan University in Kalamazoo, Michigan on an academic scholarship, before deciding to focus solely on his musical career.

=== Early career ===
He began his professional career as a songwriter and session musician for Columbia Records artist George LaMond, contributing songs and vocal and instrumental arrangements to LaMond's debut record Bad of the Heart. Carlock built a 16-track recording studio and continued to develop as a producer and writer. He later moved to New York, where he stayed for three years, and then moved to Los Angeles.

While in New York, Carlock worked as a technician and consultant with artists such as Hall & Oates and Lenny Kravitz using a recording platform known as Pro Tools. He produced local bands, most notably Coward, who signed with Elektra Records.

=== 1998–2008 ===
Carlock moved to Los Angeles, where he worked with Greg Ladanyi, producer of pop music artists like Don Henley, Jackson Browne, Fleetwood Mac, and Warren Zevon. He partnered with Ladanyi's Tidal Wave Entertainment in 1999 for a year, during which time they co-produced, with David Foster, The Tubes' live/studio hybrid album Tubes World Tour 2001, which featured collaborations with Richard Marx and Steve Lukather. Carlock's involvement with Ladanyi also led to sessions with Eric Clapton, Dolly Parton, Rodney Crowell, and others.

Carlock started a long collaboration in 2000 with Rancid frontman and punk rock songwriter Tim Armstrong, first as engineer/mixer on several projects for Armstrong's label, Hellcat Records, and then as co-producer/co-writer. The team's first co-production work was on the Transplants record, which was born out of the combination of two projects: a side project for Armstrong and a separate project Carlock and Armstrong were recording for Armstrong's friend and AFI roadie Rob Aston. After working off and on for two years, then adding Travis Barker to the band, the Transplants were formed. Carlock toured as keyboardist/sample guru during the Transplants tour with the Foo Fighters and appeared with the band on Jimmy Kimmel Live! and Snoop Dogg's Doggy Fizzle Televizzle show.

The Transplants singles "Diamonds and Guns" and "D.J. D.J." quickly became MTV favorites and earned the band critical and commercial success. "Diamonds and Guns" has been featured on TV commercials for Garnier Fructis shampoo and Neutrogena. The song was used on the soundtrack for the movie Bulletproof Monk (2003). The band followed up the record's success by touring with the Foo Fighters.

Carlock engineered on nine songs for Pink's album Try This in 2003, performing bass, vocals, keys and programming. Carlock next started up a production label called 27 Sounds to produce and collaborate with unsigned artists.

In 2004–2005, Carlock worked with the Transplants for their second album, Haunted Cities, co-producing and engineering with Tim Armstrong and contributing keyboards, bass, guitar, vocals, theremin, and songwriting. In the fall, he also worked with Nine Inch Nails in preparation for their summer tour.

In 2006, several EPs produced and cowritten by Carlock were released by 27 Sounds artists. From the first group which included Counterpush, R&B/pop artist Jackie Ray, pop/rock/dance artist Shevyn and 14-year-old pop/rock artist Shelby Spalione.

Spalione was immediately signed by the producers of Hannah Montana after hearing her work with Carlock and seeing her perform at the House Of Blues in Hollywood. Shelby soon after adopted the name Shelby Cobra and became lead singer for KSM, on Walt Disney Records. UPDATE: In 2013, Shelby readopted her last name Spalione while appearing on the song "Bang Bang" with Will.I.Am for The Great Gatsby soundtrack, performing the song live with Will.I.Am on American Idol.

In the fall of 2007, Carlock relocated his recording studio to an emerging arts community on the shores of Lake Michigan, just outside Chicago and has since been writing and producing independent records for his 27 Sounds artists and mixing for other artists worldwide since.

=== Awards and honors ===
In 2003, Carlock received a Grammy Award Certificate for his engineering work on Pink's song "Trouble".

== Discography ==
- Tuscan Sky
  - Artist: Bryan Lubeck
    - Label: Vineyard Music Productions
    - Role: E
- Blue
  - Artist: Michelle Bythrow
    - Label: 27 Sounds
    - Role: P/E/M/Arr/Instr
- Wonderland Road
  - Artist: Jeff Cameron
    - Label: Gazworks
    - Role: M
- Bob Rubin Live
  - Artist: Bob Rubin
    - Label: Gazworks
    - Role: M
- A Different Story To Tell
  - Artist: Art Gomperz Band
    - Label: All About Murray Records
    - Role: P/E/M
- The Most Wonderful Time of the Year
  - Artist: Paul Mow
    - Label: TBA
    - Role: E/M
- Rough Day
  - Artist: Johnny Morales
    - Label: 27 Sounds
    - Role: P/E/M/W/Instr.
- Dig Deep
  - Artist: Roger Steen Band
    - Label: TBA
    - Role M
- Vineyard Grooves
  - Artist: Bryan Lubeck
    - Label: Earthscape Media
    - Role: Vocals/E/Arr.
- Our Song
  - Artist: Laura Scott
    - Label: TBA
    - Role: P/E/M/W/Instr.
- DeeeLish
  - Artist: Desiree Cuchiara
    - Label: 27 Sounds
    - Role: P/E/M/W/Instr
- Tell the Truth
  - Artist: Gary Cambra
    - Label: TBA
    - Role: E/M/Instr
- Honest To God
  - Artist: Trent Smith
    - Label:
    - Role: Mixer
- Suffocating/Paralyzed
  - Artist: Charlie Kim
    - Label: 27 Sounds
    - Role: P/E/M/W/Instr
- Criss Cross Applesauce
  - Artist: Shelby Spalione
    - Label: 27 Sounds
    - Role: P/E/M/W/Instr
- Inneraction
  - Artist: Shevyn
    - Label: 27 Sounds
    - Role: P/E/M/W/Instr
- Dragonfli Baby
  - Artist: Jackie Ray
    - Label: 27 Sounds
    - Role: P/E/M/W/Instr
- End Of Reason
  - Artist: End Of Reason
    - Label: 27 Sounds
    - Role: P/E/M/W/Instr
- Haunted Cities
  - Artist: Transplants
    - Label: LaSalle/Atlantic
    - Role: P/E/M/W/Instr
- Hardcore For Life
  - Artist: Danny Diablo
    - Label: LaSalle
    - Role: E/M/W/Instr
- Heart & Soul
  - Artist: Joe Cocker
    - Label: New Door
    - Role: Edit
- Blisstique
  - Artist: Blisstique
    - Label: Woo
    - Role: P/E/M/W/Instr
- Electric Ladybugs
  - Artist: Electric Ladybugs
    - Label: Koo Moon
    - Role: P/E/M/W/Instr
- De Anima
  - Artist: Counterpush
    - Label: 27 Sounds
    - Role: P/E/M/W/Instr
- Crickets & Their Buddies
  - Artist: The Crickets
    - Label: Sovereign Artists
    - Role: E/Edit/BGV
- 20 Bucks & Two Black Eyes
  - Artist: US Roughnecks
    - Label: Hellcat/Epitaph
    - Role: M
- Try This
  - Artist: Pink
    - Label: LaFace
    - Role: E/Instr/BGV/

2004 Grammy Award Certificate—Engineer RIAA Certified 2× PLATINUM US

- Blink-182
  - Artist: Blink-182
    - Label: Geffen
    - Role: Pre-Prod E/Arr

RIAA Certified 2× PLATINUM US

- Bryan Lubeck
  - Artist: Mysterious Woman
    - Label: Mamma Grace
    - Role: P/E/M
- Indestructible
  - Artist: Rancid
    - Label: Hellcat/Warner
    - Role: Writer/E/Edit
- West For Wishing
  - Artist: Matchbook Romance
    - Label: Epitaph
    - Role: E/Edit
- We're a Happy Family: A Tribute to Ramones
  - Artist: Various
    - Label: DV8/Columbia
    - Role: M/E
- Transplants
  - Artist: Transplants
    - Label: Hellcat
    - Role: P/E/M/W/Instr
- The Defense
  - Artist: Bad Religion
    - Label: Epitaph
    - Role: E/Edit
- Process Of Belief
  - Artist: Bad Religion
    - Label: Epitaph
    - Role: Edit
- An American Paradox
  - Artist: Strung Out
    - Label: Fat Wreck Chords
    - Role: Edit
- BYO Split Series, Vol. 3
  - Artist: Rancid/NOFX
    - Label: BYO
    - Role: M/E
- Rancid (2000)
  - Artist: Rancid
    - Label: Epitaph
    - Role: Edit
- Sing Sing Death House
  - Artist: The Distillers
    - Label: Hellcat
    - Role: E
- When Music Meets Film
  - Artist: Various
    - Label: Beyond
    - Role: Edit
- Kiss Me There
  - Artist: Jo Davidson
    - Label: Edel America
    - Role: E/Edit
- Tubes World Tour 2001
  - Artist: The Tubes
    - Label: CMC/Sanctuary
    - Role: P/E/M/Edit
- Lucky Man
  - Artist: Hal Ketchum
    - Label: Curb
    - Role: Edit
- Arch Allies: Live at Riverport
  - Artist: Styx
    - Label: Sanctuary
    - Role: E
- Days Of Avalon
  - Artist: Richard Marx
    - Label: Signal 21
    - Role: Edit
- Del Otro Lado
  - Artist: Araque
    - Label: Edel
    - Role: E/Edit
- Tell The Story
  - Artist: Jo Davidson
    - Label: FTG Records
    - Role: Edit
- Bajo el Azul de Tu Misterio
  - Artist: Jaguares
    - Label: BMG
    - Role: Edit
- Sun
  - Artist: Lisa Hayes & The Violets
    - Label: Atlantic
    - Role: Edit
- 7 Deadly Zens
  - Artist: Tommy Shaw
    - Label: CMC
    - Role: Edit
- Mi Mejor Regalo
  - Artist: Yolandita
    - Label: WEA
    - Role: W
- Fiesta En Navidad
  - Artist: Various
    - Label: WTG Records
    - Role: W/Arr
- Christmas In The City
  - Artist: Various
    - Label: WTG Records
    - Role: W/Arr
- Bad Of The Heart
  - Artist: George LaMond
    - Label: Columbia
    - Role: W/Prog/Arr
