= Days of the White Owl =

Studio album by The Nerve Agents
- Released: July 4, 2000
- Recorded: November 1999; Art of Ears, Hayward, California, U.S.
- Genre: Hardcore punk, horror punk
- Length: 29:54
- Label: Revelation Records
- Producer: Andy Ernst; The Nerve Agents

The Nerve Agents chronology
The Nerve Agents (EP) (1998)	Days of the White Owl (2000)	The Butterfly Collection (2001)

Professional ratings
Review scores
Source	Rating
AllMusic	1.5/5 stars

Days of the White Owl is the first full-length album from Californian hardcore punk band, The Nerve Agents. It was released in July 2000 on Revelation Records and it follows their self-titled EP from 1998.

== Overview ==
As with their debut EP, the emphasis is on classic style hardcore punk, played at a fast pace – the songs are rarely over 2 1/2 minutes long.

Piano pieces at the beginning and end – played and written by bass player, Dante Sigona – are in stark contrast to the music contained within. A lot of the songs rely on bass as well as guitar riffs to carry the melody on to its swift conclusion.

The band received some criticism for this album for the lack of originality – but by and large it was well received by hardcore punk fans, with its catchy tunes and breakneck pace.

== Track listing ==
All tracks written by The Nerve Agents, unless otherwise stated

All music is composed by The Nerve Agents, except where noted.

No.	Title	Length
1.	"Spring Heeled Jack – Intro" (Dante Sigona)	0:35
2.	"Fall of the All American"	1:14
3.	"Prey"	2:16
4.	"Days of the White Owl"	1:53
5.	"Portland"	1:32
6.	"Off Come the Blindfolds"	1:44
7.	"Your Warning"	1:30
8.	"Jekyl and Hyde"	2:13
9.	"Next in Line"	1:30
10.	"The Invincible"	1:40
11.	"Dead Man Walking"	1:57
12.	"Out on the Farm"	2:25
13.	"A Sad History"	1:50
14.	"Just a Visual"	2:21
15.	"Evil" (45 Grave)	2:43
16.	"The Blue Lady – Outro" (Dante Sigona)	2:33
Total length:		29:56

== Personnel ==
- Eric "Sheric D" – vocals
- Zac "The Butcher" Hunter – guitar
- Tim "Timmy Stardust" Presley – guitar
- Dante Sigona – bass, piano
- Andy "Outbreak" Granelli – drums
- Davey Havok – additional vocals on "Jekyl And Hyde"
- Dixie Death – additional vocals on "Evil"
- Recorded, mixed and mastered in November, 2000 at the Art of Ears, Hayward, California, USA
- Produced by Andy Ernst and The Nerve Agents

== See also ==
- Redemption 87's album, All Guns Poolside – Eric Ozenne's previous band
