= Alive as You Are =

Alive As You Are

Studio album by Darker My Love
- Released: 26 July 2010 (UK); 17 August 2010 (US)
- Recorded: January 2010
- Studio: Hyde Street Studios, San Francisco
- Length: 35:53
- Label: Dangerbird Records
- Producer: Nick Huntington, Darker My Love

Darker My Love chronology
2 (2008)	Alive As You Are (2010)

Alive As You Are is the third and final album by Darker My Love. It was released on 26 July 2010 in the UK and 17 August 2010 in North America on Dangerbird Records.

== Track listing ==
All tracks by Tim Presley except where noted.

1. "Backseat" – 3:15
2. "Split Minute" – 2:55
3. "18th Street Shuffle" – 4:17
4. "New America" – 3:41
5. "Rain Party" – 3:33
6. "Maple Day Getaway" (Rob Barbato, Presley) – 2:32
7. "Trail the Line" (Barbato) – 3:03
8. "June Bloom" – 4:31
9. "Dear Author" (Barbato) – 2:51
10. "A Lovely Game" (Barbato, Presley) – 2:34
11. "Cry On Me Woman" – 2:33

== Personnel ==
Darker My Love

- Tim Presley – vocals, guitar
- Rob Barbato – vocals, bass guitar
- Jared Everett – guitar, sax
- Will Canzoneri – organ, clavinet, accordion
- Dan Allaire – drums, percussion
- Maria Taylor – vocals
- Joe Goldmark – pedal steel guitar
- Moira Little – oboe, English horn
- Leonard Edmondson – bassoon

Production

- Nick Huntington – production, mixing
- Drew Fischer – engineer, mixing
- Chris Reynolds – engineer
- Jason Lader – mixing
- Dave Cooley – mastering
- Malia James – photography

== Reception ==
- AllMusic - "More Beatles/Dylan than My Bloody Valentine, Alive as You Are is an album that's more about being listened to than just felt. With layers of vocal and guitar melodies at work, songs like 'Trail the Line' and 'Dear Author' have a carefully constructed depth that feels more intricate than 2's thick fuzz was able to produce. This kind of precision helps to give you the feeling that this is an album that was written and not just jammed out, allowing you to feel the hand of its creator and to appreciate the songcraft at work here. While fans of Darker My Love's earlier albums may be a bit put off by this sudden sea change, Alive as You Are marks a pleasant sonic shift for the band, offering anyone willing to listen a love letter to San Francisco's psych-pop past and the sounds of the paisley underground. ".
- Pitchfork - "Alive As You Are mines the 1960s folk-rock canon with a near-dopey lack of shame. If the Dylan-esque vocal aping on opening track "Backseat" doesn't make you blush for these guys' sake, try the following cut, "Split Minute", which is basically the Byrds' "Turn! Turn! Turn!" sans any trace of the original's euphoric payoff." (Rating: 5.8/10)
- Drowned in Sound - "Granted, one wouldn't have wished for a watered down xerox of its predecessor, but the West Coast psychedelia on a Nashville vacation of Alive As You Are could almost be a different band entirely. When Tim Presley sings "Act like you were born again in your own time" on the album's midpoint 'Maple Day Getaway' he could almost be writing his and Darker My Love's updated autobiography. Certainly anyone expecting a repeat of the gargantuan riffs and soaring melodies of 'Summer Is Here' and 'Talking Words' will be disappointed here, although once the initial shock subsides, there are still a handful of treasures in Alive As You Are to suggest the instinctive chameleon within the band hasn't totally dampened their songwriting abilities".
- The A.V. Club - "After two records of clamorous psych-rock, the group now winds the clock back 40 years for an influence-worshipping period piece. Recording in the famed Hyde Street Studios, Darker My Love borrows heavily from its past clients (especially Grateful Dead) and injects stretches of Beatles-aping, but even those tiring of the Blitzen Trapper/Fleet Foxes throwback sound shouldn't immediately dismiss it: The styles and guitar work may be lifted from classic-rock radio, but the songwriting is impressively genuine. At times warmly sunny and loose and at other times coolly subdued, Alive As You Are is undeniably personal, with a depth lacking in the group's previous reverb-soaked fuzz anthems." (Grade: B+)
- NME - "If we close our eyes hard enough, we can almost visualise the members of Darker My Love blowing lungfuls of cheap hash out of our old bedroom window while heads bob in unison to the strains of The Grateful Dead's 'American Beauty'. And by God, does it make us giddy. Inspired by the death of frontman Tim Presley's father, 'Alive As You Are' is a minor masterpiece, a record whose points of reference – the aforementioned Dead, Moby Grape, Teenage Fanclub – are impeccable, but never merely parroted back at you. From the countrified guitar licks and spectral three-part harmonies of opener 'Backseat', through the stoned shoegaze of 'Split Minute' and the dream-pop of 'June Bloom', this is an album to be held close to your heart and revered as psych-pop scripture.
