= Diamonds and Guns =

Single by Transplants

from the album Transplants
- B-side: "Tall Cans in the Air"
- Released: October 15, 2002
- Studio: Tim's Basement (Los Angeles, California)
- Genre: Hip hop; punk rock
- Length: 4:02
- Label: Hellcat
- Songwriters: Tim Armstrong; Rob Aston; Jason Vasquez; Travis Barker
- Producers: Tim Armstrong; Dave Carlock

Transplants singles chronology
"Diamonds and Guns" (2002)	"D.J. D.J." (2003)

Music video
- "Diamonds and Guns" on YouTube

"Diamonds and Guns" is the debut single by American punk rock/hip hop band Transplants, released on October 15, 2002, as the lead single from their debut studio album. It was recorded at Tim's Basement in Los Angeles, California, produced by Tim Armstrong and Dave Carlock, and released via Hellcat Records. The track, "Diamonds and Guns", was written and performed by the Transplants (Robert "Skinhead Rob" Aston, Tim Armstrong, Travis Barker) and Jason "Son Doobie" Vasquez of Funkdoobiest. The single peaked at No. 19 on the Billboard Modern Rock Tracks chart in the United States and No. 27 on the UK Singles Chart. All four performers appeared in the music video for "Diamonds and Guns".

The instrumental version of "Diamonds and Guns" was played as background music in Garnier Fructis commercials for several years. The song had minor edits, toning down the guitar distortion. The song has appeared in various media, including the Smallville second-season episode "Visitor" and an episode of Fastlane. It was also featured in the film Bulletproof Monk during the introduction of the character Kar. Additionally, the song is included on the soundtrack for the video game WWE 2K26.

== Track listing ==
Adapted from Discogs

7", CD, Maxi, vinyl
No.	Title	Writer(s)	Length
1.	"Diamonds and Guns"	T. Armstrong; R. Aston; J. Vasquez; T. Barker	4:02
2.	"Tall Cans in the Air"	T. Armstrong; R. Aston; T. Barker	3:44

Note

- †Music video for "Diamonds and Guns" also featured in some versions of the single.

== Personnel ==
"Diamonds and Guns"

- Tim Armstrong - vocals, guitar, bass, loops, lyrics, mixing, producer
- Rob "Skinhead Rob" Aston - vocals, lyrics, scratches
- Travis Barker - drums
- Jason "Son Doobie" Vasquez - vocals, lyrics
- Dave Carlock - backing vocals, piano, mixing, producer
- Gene Grimaldi - mastering

"Tall Cans in the Air"

- Tim Armstrong - vocals, guitar, loops, lyrics, mixing, producer
- Rob "Skinhead Rob" Aston - vocals, lyrics
- Travis Barker - drums
- Dave Carlock - synthesizer, mixing, producer
- Brody Dalle - backing vocals
- Matt Freeman - bass
- Victor Ruggiero - Hammond B-3 organ
- Gene Grimaldi - mastering

== Charts ==
Chart (2003)	Peak position
UK Singles Chart	27
US Modern Rock Tracks (Billboard)	19
