= Seneca Falls =

Seneca Falls may refer to:

- Seneca Falls, New York, a town in the United States
- Seneca Falls (CDP), New York, a hamlet in the United States
- The Seneca Falls Convention (1848), the first women's rights convention
- "Seneca Falls", a song by The Distillers from the album Sing Sing Death House
- Seneca Falls, one of 24 named waterfalls in Ricketts Glen State Park in Pennsylvania
