= 2 (Darker My Love album) =

Studio album by Darker My Love
- Released: 5 August 2008
- Recorded: 2007
- Studio: Sunset Sound Recorders
- Label: Dangerbird Records
- Producer: Dave Cooley

Darker My Love chronology
Darker My Love (2006)	2 (2008)	Alive As You Are (2010)

Professional ratings
Review scores
Source	Rating
AllMusic	4.5/5 stars
The Independent	4/5 stars
Culturedeluxe	(8/10)
Drowned In Sound	(6/10)
Los Angeles Times	(?)
Pitchfork Media	(4.4/10.0)
This Is Fake DIY	(7/10)

2 is the second album by the Los Angeles band Darker My Love. Recorded primarily at Sunset Sound Recorders in Los Angeles, with additional recording at Sage & Sound, The Boat, Sonora and Westbeach Recorders, it is the first with Will Canzoneri on organ and clavinet. It was released on 5 August 2008. The artwork for the album was by the lead guitarist/vocalist Tim Presley. Several of the songs on 2 had previously been performed live in a different arrangement under various working titles, appearing on the set of live albums that Darker My Love recorded during their Spaceland residency in 2006.

The album, produced by Dave Cooley and mixed by Tony Hoffer, peaked at #41 on the heatseekers album chart.

== Track listing ==
The band simultaneously released two different versions of the album, on CD and double LP, with different track listings. The LP version also has the track "Pharoah Sanders' Tomb".

=== CD version ===
No.	Title	Writer(s)	Length
1.	"Northern Soul"	Barbato	4:17
2.	"Blue Day"	Presley/Barbato	3:19
3.	"Two Ways Out"	Barbato	3:34
4.	"Pale Sun"	Barbato	2:56
5.	"White Composition"	Presley/Barbato	3:27
6.	"Add One To the Other One"	Presley/DML	3:39
7.	"Even In Your Lightest Day"	Presley/Barbato	2:15
8.	"All The Hurry & Wait"	Presley	4:39
9.	"Waves"	Presley/DML	2:52
10.	"Talking Words"	Presley	3:09
11.	"Immediate Undertaking"	Presley	6:39

=== LP version ===
Side A
No.	Title	Writer(s)	Length
1.	"All the Hurry & Wait"	Presley	4:17
2.	"Waves"	Presley/DML	3:19
3.	"Talking Words"	Presley	3:34

Side B
No.	Title	Writer(s)	Length
4.	"Blue Day"	Presley/Barbato	2:56
5.	"White Composition"	Presley/Barbato	3:27
6.	"Add One To the Other One"	Presley/DML	3:39

Side C
No.	Title	Writer(s)	Length
7.	"Even In Your Lightest Day"	Presley/Barbato	2:15
8.	"Northern Soul"	Barbato	4:39
9.	"Pharoah Sanders' Tomb"	Presley/Barbato	2:52

Side D
No.	Title	Writer(s)	Length
10.	"Two Ways Out"	Barbato	6:39
11.	"Pale Sun"	Barbato	3:09
12.	"Immediate Undertaking"	Presley	4:45

== Personnel ==
- Tim Presley – vocals/guitar
- Rob Barbato – vocals/bass guitar
- Jared Everett – guitar
- Will Canzoneri – organ/clavinet
- Andy Granelli – drums
- Orpheo McCord – percussion (on "Even in Your Lightest Day")
- Stephanie O'Keefe – French horn
- Bruce Otto – tenor and bass trombone
- The Section Quartet – strings
  - Eric Gorfain – violin
  - Daphne Chen – violin
  - Leah Katz – viola
  - Richard Dodd – cello
- Timm Boatman – bells
- Steven Rhodes – shaker (on "Northern Soul")

Production and design

- Produced by Dave Cooley
- Mixed by Tony Hoffer
- Engineered by Steven Rhodes
- Mastered by Alan Yoshida
- Strings and brass on "All The Hurry & Wait" arranged by Will Canzoneri
- Artwork by Tim Presley
- Layout by Sara Cummings
- A&R – Jeff Castelaz and Peter Walker
- Management – Dangerbird
