= The Nerve Agents =

American punk rock band

- Origin: San Francisco, California
- Genres: Hardcore punk, horror punk
- Years active: 1998–2002
- Labels: Hellcat, Revelation, Session, Mankind
- Members: Eric Ozenne; Timmy Stardust; Zac Hunter; Dante Sigona; Andy Outbreak; Josh Stokes
- Website: http://www.myspace.com/thenerveagents

The Nerve Agents were an American punk rock band formed by Andy Outbreak and Eric Ozenne (ex-Redemption 87).

Their angry brand of music juxtaposed yelled, sometimes ranting vocals with distorted and often chorus laden chords, complex bass lines and fast-paced percussion. Their darkened style is reminiscent of Black Flag and The Damned.

The Nerve Agents were noted for their frenzied, chaotic, often violent live performances. It was not unusual for a fan or band member to require medical attention. Often on such occasions Eric Ozenne would halt performances, sometimes escorting the injured fan to the hospital. Other theatrical elements, such as costumes and the trademark eyeliner, were commonplace. On rare occasions a guest performer known only as the 'White Owl' (taking its name from the theme of the first full length) would run across the stage in a white mummy-like robe.

There are many rumors surrounding the band's demise. Andy Outbreak's involvement in The Distillers became a source of scheduling tension, as was the pending birth of Ozenne's daughter. The band played their last two shows on Sunday, December 30, 2001, at the Pound in San Francisco, sharing the bill with Lars Frederiksen and the Bastards.

Members of The Nerve Agents are now/or used to be in the bands White Fence, Said Radio, Darker My Love, The Fall, The Frisk, Hudson Criminal, Model American, Fury 66, The Distillers, Seized Up, Redemption 87, Pitch Black, Unit Pride, Shadowboxer, and FIVE.

They cited influences including AFI, T.S.O.L., Samhain, 7 Seconds, Blast, Black Flag, Antidote, Rancid, Screw 32, the Clash, Youth of Today, Bad Brains, Dead Kennedys, Circle Jerks, the Damned, Misfits, 45 Grave, Christian Death, Siouxsie and the Banshees, Joy Division and the Smiths.

== Line-up ==
- Sheric D. (Eric Ozenne) - vocals (currently lead vocals for Said Radio)
- Timmy Stardust (Tim Presley) - guitar (currently lead vocals and guitar for Darker My Love and White Fence, and backing vocals for The Strange Boys)
- Zac "The Butcher" Hunter - guitar (2000–2002) (currently guitar for Hudson Criminal)
- Dante Sigona - bass, piano (currently guitar for Said Radio)
- Andy Outbreak (Andy Granelli) - drums
- Kevin Cross - guitar & bass (1998–2000) (currently guitar for Pitch Black)

== Discography ==
- The Nerve Agents (1998, eponymous 8-song EP), Revelation Records
- The Nerve Agents/Kill Your Idols (split) (2000, 3 songs by each band), Mankind Records
- The Way It Should Be... (compilation) (2000, featured song "Bitter Seed"), Sessions Records
- Days of the White Owl (2000, 16-song LP), Revelation Records
- The Butterfly Collection (2001, 14-songs, final LP), Hellcat Records

== DVD ==
- Give 'Em the Boot features a live performance of the song "Evil", by the Los Angeles deathrock band 45 Grave.

== See also ==
- Redemption 87 – Eric Ozenne's previous band
- All Guns Poolside – Redemption 87 album page
