= Hair (White Fence album) =

Studio album by Ty Segall and White Fence
- Released: April 24, 2012
- Genre: Psychedelic rock, garage rock
- Length: 28:57
- Label: Drag City
- Producer: Eric Bauer

White Fence chronology
Family Perfume (2012)	Hair (2012)	Cyclops Reap (2013)

Ty Segall chronology
Goodbye Bread (2011)	Hair (2012)	Twins (2012)

Professional ratings
Aggregate scores
Source	Rating
Metacritic	80/100
Review scores
Source	Rating

Hair is a collaborative album between California musicians Ty Segall and Tim Presley (playing under the name White Fence). The album was released through Drag City Records for Record Store Day 2012, for a limited run but has however, been repressed. The album was originally intended to be a split album between Segall and Presley, however they then decided to collaborate on all of the tracks. Presley had already previously recorded the track "I Am Not A Game," however re-recorded it for the album.

== Track listing ==
No.	Title	Writer(s)	Length
1.	"Time"	Segall/Presley	4:11
2.	"I Am Not a Game"	Presley	4:04
3.	"Easy Ryder"	Segall	2:23
4.	"The Black Glove/Rag"	Presley	5:04
5.	"Crybaby"	Segall	1:58
6.	"(I Can't) Get Around You"	Presley	2:50
7.	"Scissor People"	Segall/Presley	3:30
8.	"Tongues"	Segall/Presley	4:57
