= Sologamy (album) =

Studio album by Death Pill
- Released: June 20, 2025
- Length: 25:41
- Label: New Heavy Sounds

Death Pill chronology
Death Pill (2023)	Sologamy (2025)

Singles from Sologamy
- 1. "Craterface" Released: 14 April 2025; 2. "Phone Call" Released: 21 May 2025

Sologamy is the second studio album by Ukrainian riot grrrl group Death Pill. It was released on 20 June 2025 via New Heavy Sounds in LP, cassette, CD and digital formats.

== Background ==
The album was preceded by the group's eponymous debut project in 2023. It was described as "an unapologetic exploration and expression of freedom and empowerment, portraying the punk trio rebelliously embracing concepts such as self-love, self care, and self-acceptance," by New Noise. It incorporates elements of grunge, hardcore punk, and thrashcore.

"Craterface" was released as the album's first single on 14 April 2025. It was followed by, "Phone Call", the album's second single, on 21 May 2025.

== Reception ==
Professional ratings
Review scores
Source	Rating
Distorted Sound	8/10 stars
Metal Hammer	7/10 stars

Distorted Sound, referring to "mayhem of thrash, followed up with sirens blaring throughout and distant whimpers", noted that "those little details that ring out even after the music stops drive home this sentiment of chaos which is prevalent all throughout Sologamy," and rated the album eight out of ten.

Dannii Leivers of Metal Hammer assigned a rating of seven out of ten to the album, remarking "their heavy blend can't hide how melodic these choruses are, with closer 'Pro Yarika' capturing the band's ability to meld sweet vocal harmonies and rabid screams, a clompy sweet-and-sour stomp that would give Brody Dalle herself a run for her money."

Uncut commented, "Hardcore, punk, metal, grunge, thrash, riot grrrl — just some of the touchstones this album explores, all with the ferocity and melody that characterised their debut."

== Track listing ==
Sologamy track listing
No.	Title	Length
1.	"Listen to Me Sister"	3:39
2.	"Haters Gonna Hate"	1:13
3.	"Ugly Me"	1:20
4.	"Craterface"	2:26
5.	"Don't Say It So"	1:23
6.	"Phone Call"	3:04
7.	"Hey, Man"	2:14
8.	"Monsters (In My Brain)"	2:30
9.	"Outro"	4:26
10.	"Pro Yarika"	3:26
Total length:		25:41
