= Sex Bomb (disambiguation) =

"Sex Bomb" is a 1999 song by Tom Jones and Mousse T., also covered by Max Raabe.

Sex Bomb may also refer to:

- Sex Bomb, a 1993 album by Spitfire
- "Sex Bomb", a song by Flipper from the 1982 album Album – Generic Flipper
- "Sex Bomb", a song by Lords of Acid from the 2001 album Farstucker
- "Sex Bomb", a song by Spinnerette from the 2009 album Spinnerette
- Sex Bomb, a Spanish musical group made up of Yola Berrocal, Malena Gracia, and Sonia Monroy

== See also ==
- SexBomb Girls, an all-female singing, dancing and acting group from the Philippines
- Sex Bob-omb, a fictional band in the Scott Pilgrim universe
