= The Distillers (album) =

Studio album by the Distillers
- Released: April 11, 2000
- Recorded: December 1999–January 2000
- Studio: Westbeach Recorders (Hollywood)
- Genres: Punk rock; hardcore punk; street punk
- Length: 40:15
- Label: Hellcat
- Producer: Thomas Johnson

The Distillers chronology
| The Distillers (EP) (1999) | The Distillers (2000) | Sing Sing Death House (2002) |

The Distillers is the debut album by the American punk rock band the Distillers, released in 2000.

== Critical reception ==
Professional ratings
Review scores
| Source | Rating |
|---|---|
| AllMusic | 3/5 stars |
| The Encyclopedia of Popular Music | 3/5 stars |
| Kerrang! | 3/5 stars |
| In Music We Trust | A |
| Metal Hammer | 10/10 |

The Reno Gazette-Journal wrote that "Brody Armstrong delivers profane, out-of-control vocals as if she's scratching the eyes out of a lover in a bar's back alley."

== Track listing ==
All tracks are written by Brody Dalle, except "Ask the Angels" (Ivan Kral, Patti Smith) and "Girlfixer" (Dalle, Kim Fuelleman).

| No. | Title | Length |
|---|---|---|
| 1. | "Oh Serena" | 2:32 |
| 2. | "Idoless" | 2:28 |
| 3. | "The World Comes Tumblin'" | 3:08 |
| 4. | "L.A. Girl" | 2:59 |
| 5. | "Distilla Truant" | 2:24 |
| 6. | "Ask the Angels" (Patti Smith Group cover) | 3:10 |
| 7. | "Oldscratch" | 0:43 |
| 8. | "Girlfixer" | 1:14 |
| 9. | "Open Sky" | 3:07 |
| 10. | "Red Carpet and Rebellion" | 3:08 |
| 11. | "Colossus U.S.A." | 2:15 |
| 12. | "Blackheart" | 1:45 |
| 13. | "Gypsy Rose Lee" | 3:54 |
| 14. | "The Blackest Years" | 7:28 |
| Total length: | | 40:15 |

- "The Blackest Years" ends at 4:45, followed by silence, then the hidden track, "Young Girl", at 5:47. "Young Girl" was later re-recorded as a longer version with the full band and slightly different lyrics, and was released on Sing Sing Death House, the band's second album.
- "The World Comes Tumblin'" has been covered by the Wildhearts on their album of covers, Stop Us If You've Heard This One Before, Vol 1.

== Personnel ==
The Distillers

- Brody Dalle – lead vocals, guitar
- Kim "Chi" Fuelleman – bass, backing vocals
- Rose Casper – guitar
- Matt Young – drums

Additional musician

- Ronnie King – piano on "Ask the Angels"

Production

- Producer: Thomas "TJ" Johnson – producer, engineer, mixing
- Donnell Cameron – assistant engineer
- Jay Gordon – assistant engineer
- Gene Grimaldi – mastering
- Mike "Sak" Fasano – drum technician
- Jesse Fischer – art direction
- Brody Dalle – art direction
- B.J. Papas – photography
