= Brody Dalle =

Australian singer-songwriter (born 1979)

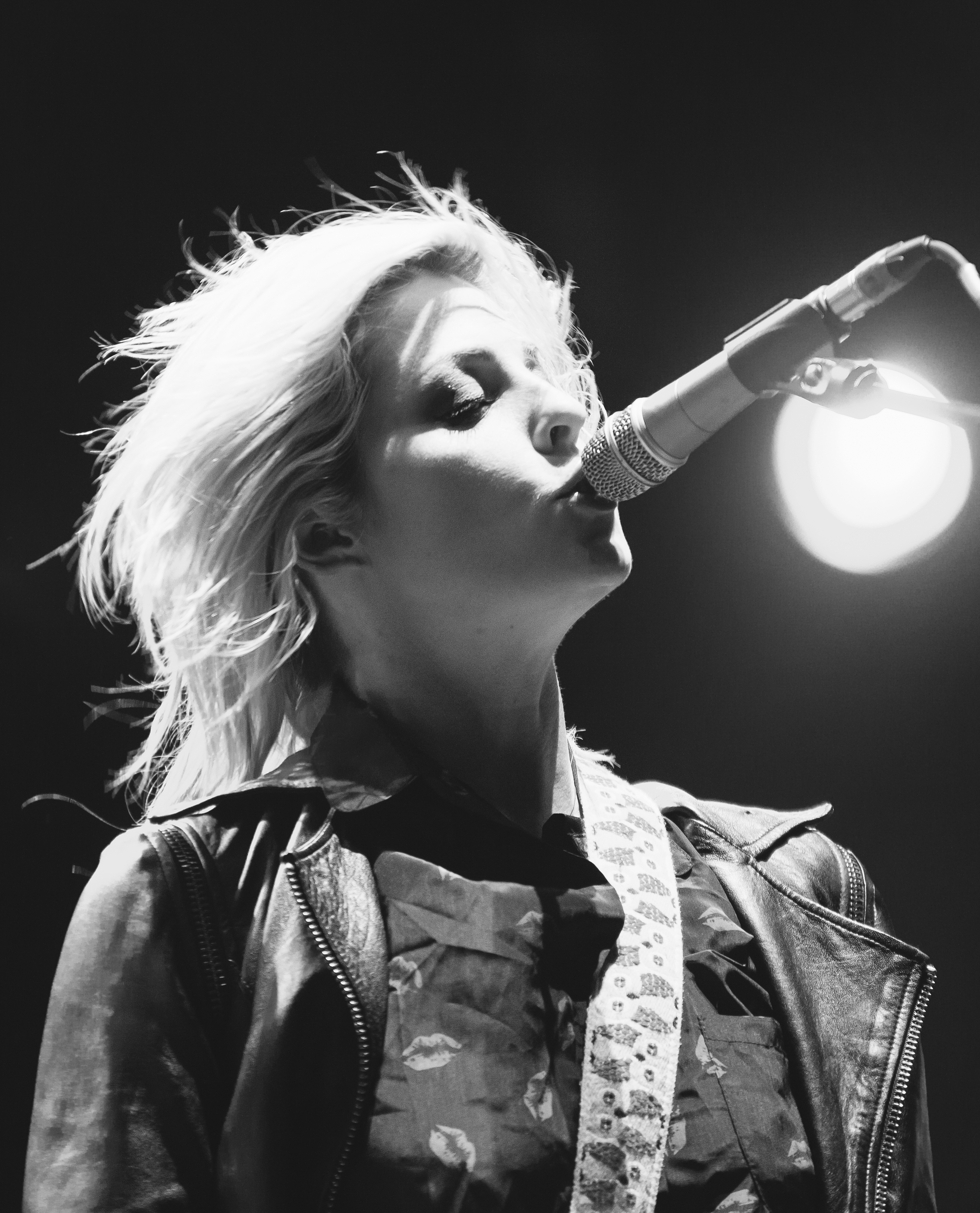
- Dalle performing in 2014
- Born: Bree Joanna Alice Robinson; 1 January 1979 (age 47); Melbourne, Victoria, Australia
- Other names: Brody Armstrong; Brody Dalle-Homme
- Occupations: Singer; songwriter; musician
- Years active: 1992–present
- Spouses: Tim Armstrong (m. 1997; div. 2003) Josh Homme (m. 2005; div. 2019)
- Children: 3
- Relatives: Al Costello (grandfather); Morgana Robinson (half-sister)
- Musical career
- Genres: Punk rock; alternative rock; hardcore punk; garage rock
- Instruments: Vocals; guitar; bass guitar; keyboards
- Labels: Hellcat; Sire; Anthem; Caroline; Queen of Hearts; Rise; Fellaheen
- Member of: The Distillers
- Formerly of: Spinnerette; Sourpuss

Brody Dalle (born Bree Joanna Alice Robinson, 1 January 1979) is an Australian singer, songwriter, and musician. She began playing music at the age of 14 and moved to Los Angeles at the age of 18, where she founded the punk rock band the Distillers. The group released three albums before disbanding in 2006. She began another project, Spinnerette, which released an eponymous album in 2009. In 2014, she released Diploid Love, her first album under her solo name. The Distillers reunited in 2018.

== Early life ==
Brody Dalle was born Bree Joanna Alice Robinson in Melbourne on 1 January 1979. She was raised in the Fitzroy and Northcote suburbs of Melbourne. Dalle's maternal grandfather was Giacomo Costa, an Italian-Australian professional wrestler best known by his ring-name, Al Costello, and the creator and original member of the tag-team the Fabulous Kangaroos. Her father left their family when she was young. Her parents later married other people; through her father's second marriage, she is the older half-sister of actress Morgana Robinson. She did not have much contact with Robinson until the two met backstage after a Distillers show in 2004, where Robinson revealed that their father now lives "in Leeds or some shit". Dalle was sexually abused as a child, spending much of her teenage years in court cases surrounding the abuse. She began training to be an Olympic swimmer as a teenager. She attended and was expelled from two Catholic high schools in Melbourne before dropping out. She also used drugs and later said, "I was never a junkie, I was never shoeless and selling my mum’s car to a Gypsy. I just experimented, like everyone else".

== Career ==
=== 1992–2006: Early projects and the Distillers ===
Dalle was intrigued by Cyndi Lauper and the Beatles as a child. At age 12, she discovered bands such as Nirvana, and cited Courtney Love and her band Hole (as well as other female-led punk groups such as Babes in Toyland and Bikini Kill) as early influences. Her musical career began at 13 years old, starting with guitar. She participated in Rock 'n' Roll High School (RnRHS), a Melbourne feminist collective started by Stephanie Bourke. She became interested in Black Flag, Discharge, and Flipper. In 1995, a few days before her 16th birthday, her first band, Sourpuss, played a set at Australia's Summersault Festival where she met Tim Armstrong, frontman of punk rock band Rancid. The two pursued a relationship - despite Dalle being 16 and Armstrong being 30 - and were engaged in 1997, shortly after Dalle turned 18. She moved with Armstrong from Melbourne to Los Angeles and there founded The Distillers.

The Distillers released their eponymous debut album in 2000. By the recording of their second album, Sing Sing Death House, the band had a new line-up, and by the time of their third album Coral Fang, Dalle was then the only remaining original member. The album received acclaim and comparisons to Hole, with Dalle often compared to Courtney Love and later to PJ Harvey. The band experienced success with several singles from the album and performed at Lollapalooza. In 2001, Dalle also made a cameo in New Found Glory's music video "My Friends Over You" with then-husband Tim Armstrong, as well as his bandmates from Transplants, Travis Barker and Rob Aston.

=== 2007–2011: Spinnerette and later work ===
Burned out and tired of one another following a grueling two-year tour, the Distillers broke up in 2005. Dalle began work on a new project called Spinnerette with Alain Johannes of Eleven. On 11 December 2008, the band released their first EP entitled Ghetto Love, with an accompanying video directed by Liam Lynch. A full-length self-titled album was released on 17 June 2009.

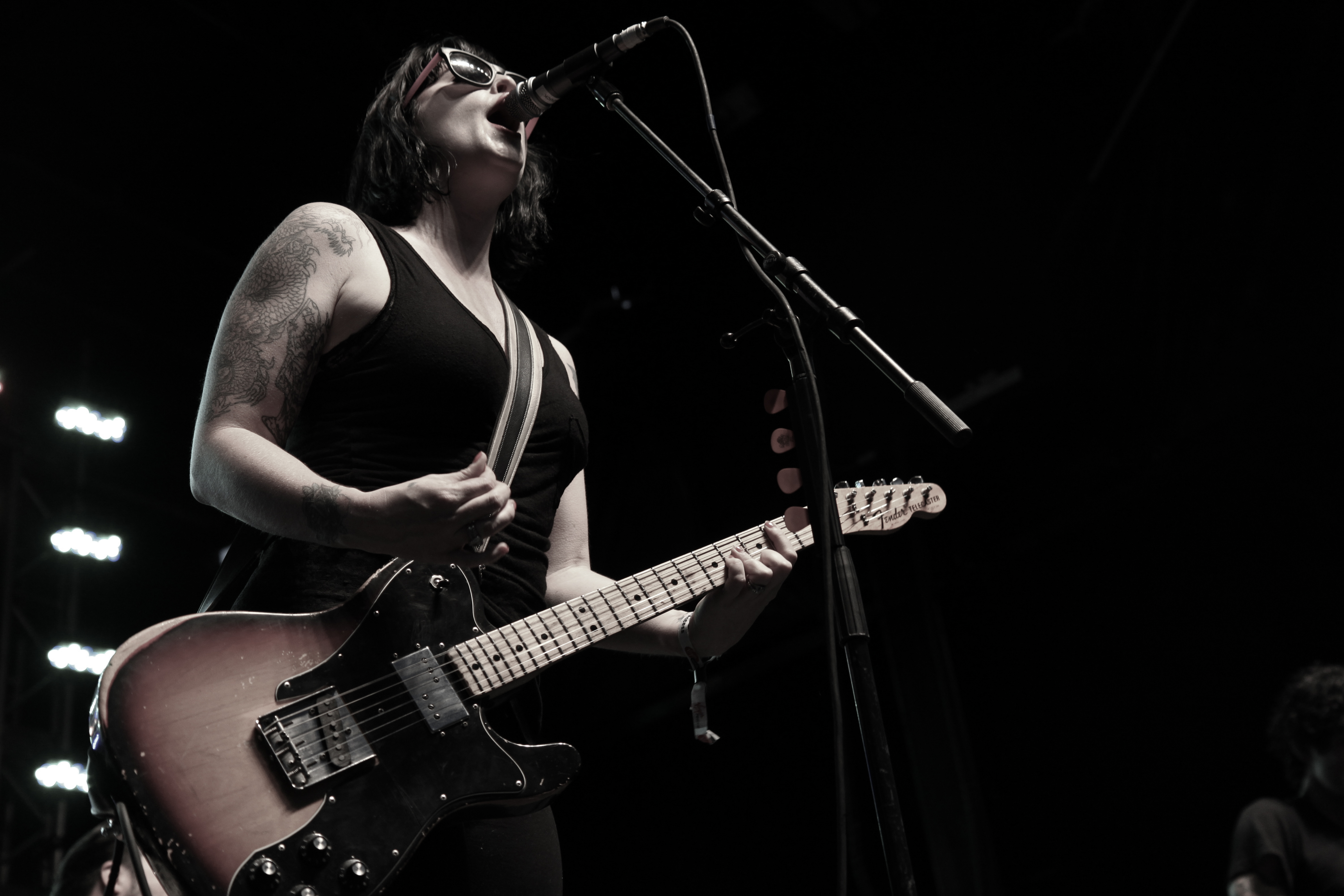
Dalle performing with Spinnerette in 2009

Dalle has also played on tracks for the band Eagles of Death Metal under various monikers and appeared on the song "Weigh on My Mind" on the Transplants' debut album in 2002. She has also made vocal appearances on Queens of the Stone Age's "You Got a Killer Scene There, Man" on their 2005 album Lullabies to Paralyze and also an appearance on Leftöver Crack's song "Muppet N.A.M.B.L.A" from their 2004 album Rock the 40 Oz: Reloaded. In 2009, she made an appearance in the same song as her husband, Josh Homme, on "Bargain Healers" from the French artist Nosfell on his self-titled album. In 2011, Brody Dalle was featured on the Boots Electric song "Boots Electric Theme."

=== 2012–2015: Solo work ===
In November 2012, Dalle announced on Twitter that she was working on a solo album, featuring Alain Johannes, Michael Shuman of Queens of the Stone Age, and Shirley Manson of Garbage.

In November 2013, Dalle announced that she had signed to Caroline Records, a division of Universal Music Group, intending to release her debut solo album in early 2014. The album was produced by Alain Johannes, and features guest appearances from Shirley Manson of Garbage, Nick Valensi of the Strokes, and Warpaint's Emily Kokal. Dalle supported Nine Inch Nails and Queens of the Stone Age on their Australia/New Zealand tour in March 2014 to promote the album.

In February 2014, Dalle released the first single from her debut solo album, Diploid Love, which would be released on 28 April 2014. The single, "Meet The Foetus / Oh The Joy", featured backing vocals by Shirley Manson and Emily Kokal. The second single from the album, "Don't Mess With Me", was used in the soundtrack of the Square Enix game Life Is Strange: Before the Storm.

=== 2018–present: The Distillers reunion ===
In January 2018, Dalle shared links from her Twitter account to a newly made Twitter account for The Distillers, as well as a previously established/archival Instagram account for the band. A teaser video was put up across all platforms, confirming the return of the band.

== Personal life ==
In 1995, at the age of 16, Dalle met 30-year-old Rancid frontman Tim Armstrong when both of their bands played at Summersault. She was with the band Sourpuss at the time. She moved to Los Angeles in 1997 to be with Armstrong, and they married later that year. They went through a bitter divorce in 2003, after Armstrong saw a picture of Dalle kissing Queens of the Stone Age frontman Josh Homme in an issue of Rolling Stone magazine; she and Homme would later marry. Rancid's 2003 album Indestructible featured songs such as "Fall Back Down" that dealt with the divorce and Armstrong's feelings towards it. Dalle has said that Armstrong was very controlling of her and that it took her three years to leave him. When she finally did, he and his friends criticized Dalle in the press, and she claims he threatened the male members of the Distillers and blacklisted anyone associated with them. After her divorce, Dalle reverted to using the surname of her favorite actress, Béatrice Dalle.

During her separation from Armstrong, Dalle reconnected with Queens of the Stone Age frontman Josh Homme, having previously met him at Lollapalooza in 1996 when he was 23 and she was 17; she was still dating Armstrong at the time. The two began dating, which led to a backlash from Armstrong and his fans. Homme claimed to have received multiple death threats from Armstrong's fans. Dalle married Homme on 3 December 2005. They have a daughter named Camille Harley Joan Homme (born 17 January 2006) and two sons named Orrin Ryder Homme (born 12 August 2011) and Wolf Dillon Reece Homme (born 14 February 2016).

Dalle filed for legal separation in November 2019 and divorce a month later, citing Homme's alcoholism and drug abuse; he subsequently entered rehab, but over the following months, he and Dalle accused each other of domestic violence and had restraining orders filed. Dalle requested that restraining orders be filed against him on behalf of their sons in September 2021, alleging physical and emotional abuse, but was denied by two judges. In 2023, Homme won sole custody of the children and was granted a restraining order against Dalle after it was discovered that her boyfriend had forged her signature on certain legal documents.

== Discography ==
=== Sourpuss ===
- Sourpuss (EP) (1995)
- Tabouli (EP) (1996)

=== Solo ===
- Diploid Love (2014)

=== Guest appearances ===
- Transplants – Transplants (2002)
- Leftöver Crack – Rock the 40 Oz: Reloaded (2004)
- Queens of the Stone Age – Lullabies to Paralyze (2005)
- Eagles of Death Metal – Death by Sexy (2006)
- Queens of the Stone Age – Era Vulgaris (2007)
- Eagles of Death Metal – Heart On (2008)
- Freeland – Cope (2009)
- Nosfell – Nosfell (2009)
- Boots Electric – Honkey Kong (2011)
- Garbage – Girls Talk (2014 Record Store Day)
- The Bronx – VCR, Dead Tracks, Vol. 2 (2019)
