= Is Growing Faith =

Studio album by White Fence
- Released: January 18, 2011
- Genres: Folk rock; psychedelia
- Length: 46:28
- Label: Woodsist
- Producer: Tim Presley

White Fence chronology
White Fence	Is Growing Faith	Family Perfume, Vol. 1

Is Growing Faith (also occasionally referred to as White Fence Is Growing Faith) is a 2011 album by Tim Presley under the moniker White Fence. The album was first released on January 18, 2011 through Woodist. Presley served as the album's primary artist and worked as the album's composer, engineer, and lyricist, as well as designing the album's artwork. Some vocals were performed by Emily Sills.

== Track listing ==
All tracks are written by Tim Presley, except where noted.

No.	Title	Writer(s)	Length
1.	"And by Always"	Tim Presley	3:44
2.	"Growing Faith"	Tim Presley	2:29
3.	"Sticky Fruitman Has Faith"	Tim Presley	3:10
4.	"Your Last Friend Alive"	Tim Presley	2:51
5.	"Enthusiasm"	Tim Presley	3:11
6.	"A Pearl Is Not a Diamond"	Tim Presley	2:22
7.	"Tumble, Lies & Honesty"	Tim Presley	3:26
8.	"Lilian (Won't You Play Drums?)"	Tim Presley	2:24
9.	"Get That Heart"	Tim Presley	3:05
10.	"Harness"	Tim Presley	2:11
11.	"Stranger Things Have Happenend"	Tim Presley	2:44
12.	"Body Cold"	Tim Presley	1:50
13.	"The Mexican Twins/Life Is... Too $hort"	Tim Presley	3:31
14.	"Art Investor Collector"	Tim Presley	2:25
15.	"When There Is No Crowd"	Tim Presley	3:49
16.	"You Can't Put Your Arms Around a Memory" (Written by)	Johnny Thunders	3:16

== Reception ==
Critical reception for Is Growing Faith has been mixed to positive and the album currently holds a rating of 71 on Metacritic, based upon 7 reviews. Allmusic praised the album as a whole and remarked that it was "a good jumping-off spot for further psychedelic discovery". Pitchfork Media also rated the album favorably and gave it an overall score of 7.4.
