= I Have to Feed Larry's Hawk =

Studio album by Tim Presley's White Fence
- Released: January 25, 2019
- Genre: Psychedelic folk, ambient
- Length: 56:03
- Label: Drag City

Tim Presley's White Fence chronology
For the Recently Found Innocent (2014)	I Have to Feed Larry's Hawk (2019)

Professional ratings
Aggregate scores
Source	Rating
Metacritic	72/100
Review scores
Source	Rating
The 405	6.5/10
AllMusic	4/5 stars
The Austin Chronicle	4/5 stars
Clash	8/10
DIY Magazine	4/5 stars
The Line of Best Fit	7.5/10
The Skinny	4/5 stars
Under the Radar	7/10 stars

I Have to Feed Larry's Hawk is the seventh studio album by American singer-songwriter Tim Presley, working under the name Tim Presley's White Fence. It was released on January 25, 2019 through Drag City Records.

== Track listing ==
No.	Title	Length
1.	"I Have to Feed Larry's Hawk"	5:13
2.	"Phone"	3:48
3.	"Fog City"	1:59
4.	"I Love You"	2:52
5.	"Lorelei"	3:21
6.	"Neighborhood Light"	2:53
7.	"I Can Dream You"	3:14
8.	"Until You Walk"	4:01
9.	"I Saw Snow Today"	2:18
10.	"Indisposed"	4:37
11.	"Forever Chained"	2:59
12.	"Fog City (Outro)"	2:05
13.	"Harm Reduction (Morning)"	8:50
14.	"Harm Reduction (Street & Inside Mind)"	7:53
