= Coral Fang =

- Original LP cover

Studio album by The Distillers
- Released: October 14, 2003
- Recorded: Spring 2003
- Studio: The Site, San Rafael, California
- Genre: Punk rock
- Length: 44:52
- Label: Sire, Hellcat
- Producer: Gil Norton

The Distillers chronology
Sing Sing Death House (2002)	Coral Fang (2003)

Alternative covers
- Mass market cover

Singles from Coral Fang
- 1. "Drain the Blood" Released: September 30, 2003; 2. "The Hunger" Released: March 29, 2004; 3. "Beat Your Heart Out" Released: July 7, 2004

Professional ratings
Aggregate scores
Source	Rating
Metacritic	71/100
Review scores
Source	Rating
AllMusic	3.5/5 stars
The A.V. Club	Mixed
NME	4/5 stars
Pitchfork	8.0/10
Robert Christgau	(3-star Honorable Mention)
Rolling Stone	4/5 stars

Coral Fang is the third studio album by the punk rock band The Distillers. It was released in 2003 through Sire Records. The album marked the band's major label debut, and is their most recent album to date. It peaked at number 97 in the US and 46 in the UK.

== Accolades ==
- Coral Fang was rated the 7th best album of 2003 by Kerrang!
- Coral Fang was ranked number 27 on Blender magazine's 50 Greatest CDs of 2003 list.
- Coral Fang was ranked number 20 on Q magazine's Recordings of the Year list in 2003.
- "Drain the Blood" was a nominee for the Kerrang! Award for Best Single in 2004.

== Track listing ==
All tracks are written by Brody Dalle.

Coral Fang track listing
No.	Title	Length
1.	"Drain the Blood"	3:08
2.	"Dismantle Me"	2:26
3.	"Die on a Rope"	2:39
4.	"The Gallow Is God"	4:35
5.	"Coral Fang"	2:09
6.	"The Hunger"	5:28
7.	"Hall of Mirrors"	3:50
8.	"Beat Your Heart Out"	2:48
9.	"Love Is Paranoid"	2:07
10.	"For Tonight You're Only Here to Know"	3:18
11.	"Death Sex"	12:17
Total length:		44:43

== Personnel ==
The Distillers

- Brody Dalle – lead vocals, rhythm guitar
- Tony Bradley – lead guitar, backing vocals
- Ryan Sinn – bass guitar, backing vocals
- Andy Granelli – drums

Production

- Producer – Gil Norton
- Executive producer – Tom Whalley
- Engineers – Bradley Cook, John Dunne
- Mixing – Andy Wallace
- Mastering – Howie Weinberg
- Technicians – Dan Druff, Mike Fazano
- Arranger – The Distillers
- Design – Richard Scane Goodheart
- Photo – James R. Minchin III
- Original artwork and layout – Tim Presley

== Use in media ==
- "Drain the Blood" was featured in Gran Turismo 4 and is a downloadable song for Rock Band.
- "Beat Your Heart Out" was featured in video games Tony Hawk's Underground 2, ATV Offroad Fury 3, and Spider-Man 2.
- The name of the band and album is also graffitied on a wall in the console version of Spider-Man 2.
- "Dismantle Me" was featured in MTX Mototrax.
- "Die on a Rope" was featured in Marvel's Daredevil in the episode "Kinbaku".

== Charts ==
=== Weekly charts ===
Chart performance for Coral Fang
Chart (2003)	Peak position
UK Albums (OCC)	46
US Billboard 200	97

=== Singles ===
Chart performance of singles from Coral Fang
Year	Title	Peak position	
Year	Title	US Alt	UK
2003	"Drain the Blood"	28	51
2004	"The Hunger"	—	48
2004	"Beat Your Heart Out"	—	74
