= Spinnerette =

American band

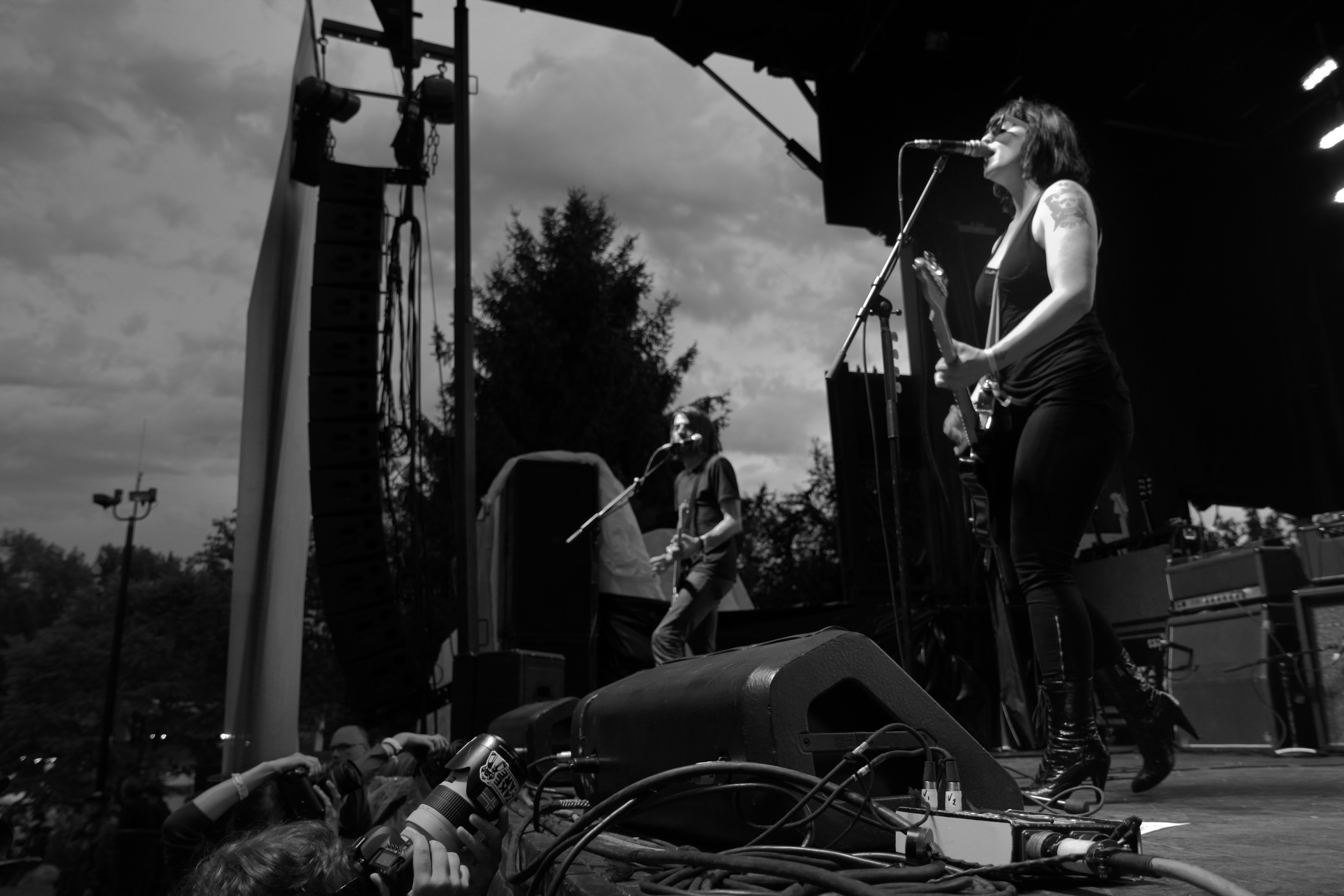
- Spinnerette playing the B.C Virgin Festival, July 2009

Background information
- Origin: Los Angeles, California, U.S.
- Genres: Alternative rock; indie rock
- Years active: 2007–2010
- Labels: Sire; Anthem; Hassle; Queen of Hearts
- Past members: Brody Dalle; Tony Bevilacqua; Alain Johannes; Jack Irons

Spinnerette was an alternative rock band formed in 2007. The band was a vehicle for the solo career of Brody Dalle following the breakup of her previous band, the Distillers, in 2006. The band featured Tony Bevilacqua (also from The Distillers), Jack Irons (What Is This?, Red Hot Chili Peppers, Walk the Moon, Eleven, Pearl Jam) and Alain Johannes (What Is This?, Walk the Moon, Eleven, Queens of the Stone Age, Them Crooked Vultures). Dalle stopped using the Spinnerette moniker in 2010 and continued her solo career under her own name.

== History ==
Spinnerette was signed to Sire Records before Dalle negotiated out of the record contract. Initially she released one demo song on her website called "Case of the Swirls".

On August 8, 2008, it was announced on Spinnerette's MySpace that fans could now hear the first song from the upcoming album via the official website. The song is called "Valium Knights". Brody performed a live version of "Driving Song" with Queens Of The Stone Age as a backing band for the Natasha Shneider benefit concert.

In October 2008, it was announced that Spinnerette was to perform several dates throughout October.

Dalle stated in an interview that there would be a different line-up when she tours for an album. "Spinnerette isn't a band, it's me and whichever musicians I want to work with at the time." She later clarified that she was referring to the touring band and not the studio musicians.

Spinnerette released a digital EP, Ghetto Love, via their official website on December 11, 2008. The band's eponymously titled full-length debut, Spinnerette, was released on June 23, 2009, via Anthem/Hassle Records.

On May 27, 2009, the following was posted on the band's website: "We are stoked to announce that we'll be joining the Leeds & Reading Festival line-up this year. Spinnerette are playing 28 August at Leeds and 29 August at Reading, on the same day as our friends the Arctic Monkeys and Eagles of Death Metal." They toured through 2009, with support coming from bands such as Little Fish, Band of Skulls and Fun Loving Criminals among others.

In 2010, the band won Best Pop/Rock Album at the Independent Music Awards for their album Spinnerette.

Dalle stopped using the Spinnerette moniker in 2010; in 2012 Dalle posted on her Twitter account that she was in the studio recording and was working with Shirley Manson of Garbage on at least one track. Dalle released her first solo album, Diploid Love, in 2014.

== Lineup ==
Current members

- Brody Dalle – vocals, guitar (2007–2010)
- Tony Bevilacqua – guitar (2007–2010)
- Alain Johannes – bass (2007–2010)
- Jack Irons – drums (2007–2010)

Touring members

- Vincent Hidalgo – bass (2009)
- Bryan Tulao – guitar (2009–2010)
- Logan Rocky - guitar (2011)
- David Hidalgo Jr. – drums (2009–2010)
- Zach Dawes – bass (2010)

== Discography ==
Studio albums

- Spinnerette (2009)

Extended plays

- Ghetto Love (2008)

Singles

- "Ghetto Love"
- "Sex Bomb"
- "Baptized by Fire"
- "All Babes Are Wolves"

Music videos

Year	Song	Director(s)
2008	"Ghetto Love"	Liam Lynch
2009	"Baptized by Fire"	Chris Hopewell
