= The Strange Boys =

American rock band

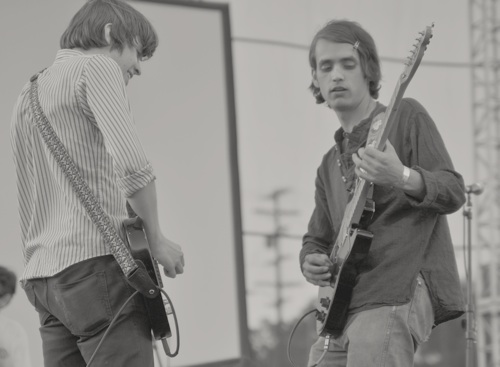
- Strange Boys live at FYF Fest in Los Angeles, 2009

Background information
- Origin: Dallas/Austin, Texas, United States
- Genres: Indie rock, Southern rock, country rock, garage rock, blues
- Years active: 2001-2012
- Labels: Dusty Medical Records, In The Red (US), Rough Trade (UK)
- Past members: Ryan Sambol; Philip Sambol; Greg Enlow; Mike La Franchi; Jenna E. Thornhill DeWitt; Tim Presley; Matt Hammer; Seth Densham

The Strange Boys were an American rock band based in Austin, Texas, composed of Ryan Sambol (guitar, lead vocals, harmonica), Philip Sambol (bass), Greg Enlow (guitar), Mike La Franchi (drums), Jenna E. Thornhill DeWitt (saxophone, backing vocals), and Tim Presley (backing vocals). Their music incorporates stylistic elements of garage rock, punk, R&B and country music.

== History ==
The Strange Boys were formed by Dallas 8th graders Ryan Sambol and Matt Hammer in 2001. Originally a punk duo, they expanded to a trio when Ryan's brother Philip returned to Dallas from college in 2003.

In 2007 the band released their debut Nothing EP on Dusty Medical Records and in 2009 their first full-length album, and Girls Club, via In the Red Records.

In late 2009 the band underwent some line-up changes, with drummer and founding member Matt Hammer being replaced by Seth Densham, originally of Mika Miko (who disbanded in October 2009). Jenna Thornhill-DeWitt, also a former member of Mika Miko, was added as saxophonist and backing vocalist, and Tim Presley, of Darker My Love, also joined to contribute backing vocals. Densham later left the group and Mikey La Franchi joined on drums.

Around the same time, the new line-up signed a deal with UK record label Rough Trade to distribute their material outside the US, and also announced details of their second album, Be Brave. It was released on February 22, 2010 (UK) and February 23, 2010 (US). The album was preceded by a single release of the title track on January 25 (UK) and January 26 (US). This track was used in a 2012 Dell commercial.

The band released their third album, Live Music (Live pronounced [lɪv], rhyming with give), exclusively on Rough Trade in October 2011.

The Strange Boys have toured alongside acts such as Darker My Love, Night Beats, Mika Miko, Fucked Up, Crystal Antlers, Chain and the Gang, Spoon, Deerhunter, and Julian Casablancas.

According to singer Ryan Sambol, The Strange Boys played what was their last show in July 2012 in Canada.

In 2013, the title track from "Be Brave" was used in a commercial for Dell. In 2014, the songs "Doueh" and "Me and You" were featured in the film Awful Nice.

Greg Enlow, a staple of the Austin music scene, died in March 2019.

Sambol has gone on to pursue a solo career, releasing the album Gestalt in 2021.

== Discography ==
- Nothing EP (Dusty Medical Records, 2007)
- Isn't It Pretty To Think So 7" (In The Red Records, 2008)
- The Strange Boys and Girls Club (In The Red, 2009)
- Be Brave 7" (In The Red/Rough Trade, 2010)
- Be Brave LP (In The Red/Rough Trade, 2010)
- Live Music LP (Rough Trade, 2011)
