= The Strange Boys and Girls Club =

Studio album by The Strange Boys
- Released: March 3, 2009 United States; March 2, 2009 UK
- Recorded: 2007–2009
- Genres: Garage Rock, R&B
- Length: 37:38
- Label: In the Red

The Strange Boys chronology
The Strange Boys and Girls Club (2009)	Be Brave (2010)

Professional ratings
Aggregate scores
Source	Rating
Metacritic	(76/100)
Review scores
Source	Rating
Allmusic	3.5/5 stars
NME	(8/10)
Pitchfork Media	(7.1/10)
Pop Matters	(7/10)
Tiny Mix Tapes	4/5 stars

The Strange Boys and Girls Club is the first album by the band The Strange Boys. It was released by In the Red Records on 2 March 2009 in the UK and a day later in the USA.

The album was initially recorded with labelmate Jay Reatard. However, the band was unhappy with the takes recorded in the sessions with Reatard and subsequently rerecorded the album with Orville Neeley. Ryan Sambol has said that this was because the recording sessions with Reatard took place at a time when the songs were still "new", and that he "hadn't really finished them". Dusted magazine reported that the recordings with Neeley were made in a disused liquor store. However, this was later denied by Sambol in an interview with Paste magazine. He clarified that this had been the case with an earlier release, recorded with Greg Ashley, not The Strange Boys and Girls Club, the recording of which took place in Neeley's garage.

The album was released to generally favourable reviews, attaining a score of 76% from the reviews collated by Metacritic.

== Track listing ==
All tracks written by Ryan Sambol, except where noted.

1. "Woe Is You and Me" - 2:13
2. "They're Building the Death Camps" - 2:51
3. "Should Have Shot Paul"^{1} - 1:55
4. "MLKs"^{2} - 1:49
5. "This Girl Taught Me a Dance" - 3:06
6. "For Lack of a Better Face" - 3:15
7. "Heard You Wanna Beat Me Up" - 2:09
8. "No Way for a Slave to Behave" - 3:11 (Ryan Sambol, Shane Renfro)
9. "Poem Party" - 1:53
10. "To Turn a Tune or Two" - 2:25
11. "Most Things" - 1:36
12. "A Man You've Never Known" - 2:00
13. "Then" - 2:11
14. "Who Needs Who More" - 2:18
15. "Probation Blues" - 2:14
16. "Death and All the Rest" - 2:39 (Ryan Sambol, Shane Renfro)

=== Footnotes to track listing ===
- 1 Listed in the album's liner notes as "Should of Shot Paul".
- 2 Acronym for 'Martin Luther Kings'. The Strange Boys released an EP entitled The Strange Boys Will Now Forever Be Known As The Martin Luther Kings in 2008, when Sambol intended to change the name of the band. Being outvoted by the other band members on the decision, he later chose to use the name for a country music project started with his friend Shane Renfro, the co-writer of tracks 8 and 16.

== Personnel ==
- Ryan Sambol: guitar, vocals, harmonica
- Philip Sambol: bass guitar
- Greg Enlow: guitar
- Matt Hammer: drums
- Orville Neeley: piano
