= Be Brave =

Studio album by The Strange Boys
- Released: March 16, 2010
- Recorded: 2009–2010
- Genre: Garage rock, R&B
- Length: 30:05
- Label: In the Red; Rough Trade

The Strange Boys chronology
The Strange Boys and Girls Club (2009)	Be Brave (2010)

Be Brave is the second and final studio album by the band The Strange Boys. It was released on March 16, 2010 via In the Red Records.

== Critical reception ==
According to Metacritic, Be Brave has an average score of 69/100, indicating "generally favorable reviews" from critics.

Professional ratings
Aggregate scores
Source	Rating
Metacritic	(69/100)
Review scores
Source	Rating
Allmusic	4/5 stars
Tiny Mix Tapes	3.5/5 stars
NME	(7/10)
PopMatters	5/10 stars
Robert Christgau	(1-star Honorable Mention)
Pitchfork Media	6.6/10 stars

== Track listing ==
1. "I See" - 3:08
2. "A Walk On The Bleach" - 3:05
3. "Be Brave" - 2:58
4. "Friday In Paris" - 2:17
5. "Between Us" - 3:20
6. "Da Da" - 2:32
7. "Night Might" - 2:13
8. "Dare I Say" - 2:31
9. "Laugh At Sex, Not Her" - 2:57
10. "All You Can Hide Inside" - 2:11
11. "The Unsent Letter" - 2:02
12. "You Can't Only Love When You Want To" - 3:15

== Personnel ==
- Ryan Sambol — lead vocals, guitar, harmonica, piano, organ
- Jenna E. Thornhill DeWitt — saxophone, backing vocals
- Greg Enlow — guitar, backing vocals, piano, organ, glockenspiel
- Philip Sambol — bass
- Mike La Franchi — drums
- Tim Presley — percussion, backing vocals; bass on "Friday in Paris"
