= Nosfell =

French rock musician (born 1977)

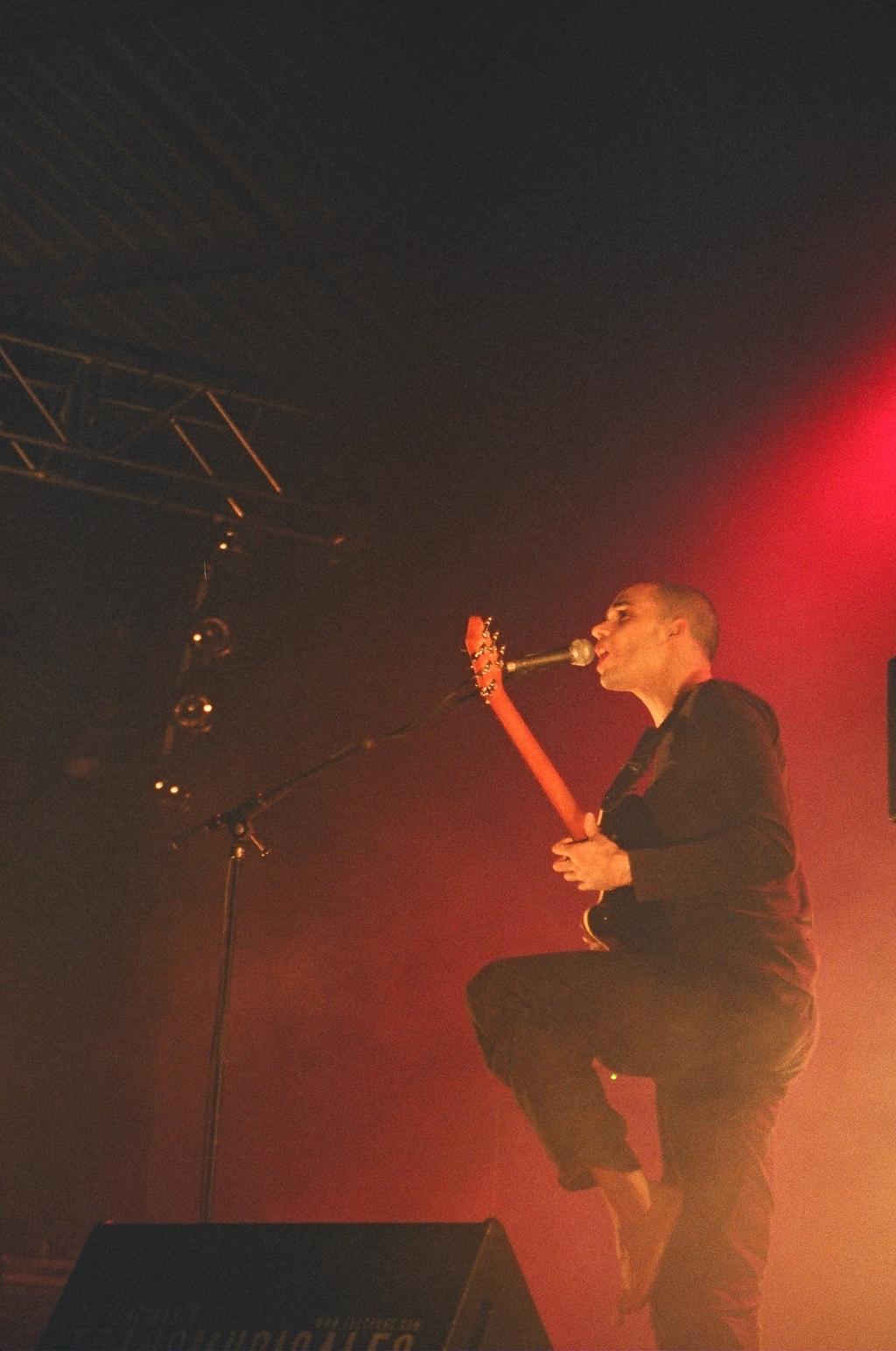
- Nosfell singing at trans musicales festival in 2004 in Rennes

Background information
- Also known as: Labyala Fela Da Jawid Fel
- Born: 1 December 1977 (age 48); Saint-Ouen, Seine-Saint-Denis
- Origin: France
- Years active: since 1998
- Label: Warner / V2
- Website: www.nosfell.com

Nosfell (born 1 December 1977 in Saint-Ouen, France) is a French rock musician who performs in a group with Pierre Lebourgeois (cellist) and Orkhan Murat (drummer). His full stage name, Labyala Fela Da Jawid Fel, means "The one who walks and heals".

== Career ==
Born in the Parisian suburbia, Nosfell studied Asian languages but became famous as a cabaret performer and musician. He played major venues including the Paris Olympia, opening for Tryo, and the Parc des Princes, opening for the Red Hot Chili Peppers and Pixies. At the Printemps de Bourges music festival he was awarded the "Attention talent scène" prize. His first self-promoted LP, Pomaïe Klokochazia balek, was released in 2004, and he then signed to record label V2 Records. He released two further albums, Kälin Bla Lemsnit Dünfel Labyanit (2006) and Nosfell (2009).

== Music ==
Nosfell's musical influences include blues, folk, funk, African music, scat, human beatbox, and other traditions. His work is characterised by his use of a distinctive invented language, "Klokobetz", which may be based on Japanese and German. He also sings in English and French.

His third album, Nosfell (produced by Alain Johannes), displays clearer rock influences than his other works. Josh Homme, Brody Dalle and Daniel Darc guest star on two of the songs. The album's release was accompanied by the publication of a book, Le Lac aux Velies, which Nosfell wrote with Ludovic Debeurme to elaborate the stories he narrates on stage.

== Discography ==
=== Albums ===
- 2003: Khayidilo (Album EP)
- 2005: Pomaïe Klokochazia balek
- 2006: Live in Bruxelles (Pomaïe Klokochazia balek, with live DVD)
- 2007: Kälin Bla Lemsnit Dünfel Labyanit
- 2009: Nosfell
- 2011: Octopus
- 2014: Amour Massif
- 2014: Contact

=== DVD ===
- 2006: Oklamindalofan, Live in Bruxelles in Brussels, 15 December 2005.

=== Book ===
- 2009: Le Lac aux Vélies (with Ludovic Debeurme's drawings), 25 June 2009
