= The Nerve Agents (EP) =

The Nerve Agents EP

EP by The Nerve Agents
- Released: November 10, 1998
- Recorded: May 1998; For The Record, Orange, California, U.S.
- Genre: Hardcore punk
- Length: 15:16
- Label: Revelation Records
- Producer: Paul Miner

The Nerve Agents chronology
The Nerve Agents EP (1998)	Days of the White Owl (2000)

The Nerve Agents EP is the self-titled debut release from Californian hardcore punk band, The Nerve Agents. It was released in November, 1998 on Revelation Records.

It was produced and engineered by Paul Miner, now known for his extensive production credits and, most notably, for his work in the band, Death by Stereo.

It was followed by the band's first full-length album, Days Of The White Owl, in 2000, also on Revelation Records.

== Overview ==
The Nerve Agents play a brand of hardcore punk which is influenced by the likes of Youth of Today, Circle Jerks, Black Flag, Cause For Alarm, 7 Seconds, and Cro-Mags.

They play short, often fast-paced, songs with a distinctive vocal style – alternating yelling with growling.

== Track listing ==
All tracks written by The Nerve Agents

1. "Carpe Diem" – 1:27
2. "Unblossomed" – 1:43
3. "The War's Not Over" – 1:37
4. "Level 4 Outbreak" – 2:01
5. "Share the Pain" – 2:02
6. "Starting Point" – 3:01
7. "Black Sheep" – 1:33
8. "I Keep Screaming" – 1:53

== Credits ==
- Eric Ozenne – vocals
- Tim Presley – guitar
- Kevin Cross – guitar, bass, vocals – credited as Kevin C. and K. Cross respectively
- Andy Granelli – drums
- Recorded in May, 1998 at For The Record, Orange, California, USA
- Produced and engineered by Paul Miner
- Front cover art by Duncan Long

== Miscellanea ==
- According to the liner notes, "Level 4 Outbreak" was inspired by Richard Preston's non-fiction bio-thriller, The Hot Zone.

== See also ==
- Redemption 87's album, All Guns Poolside – Eric Ozenne's previous band
