= Darker My Love (album) =

Studio album by Darker My Love
- Released: 22 August 2006
- Genres: Indie rock; psychedelic rock; shoegazing
- Label: Dangerbird Records

Darker My Love chronology
| Darker My Love (2006) | 2 (2008) |

Darker My Love is the first album by the Los Angeles band Darker My Love. It was released on 22 August 2006 by Dangerbird Records.

== Track listing ==
1. Opening (3:39)
2. What's A Mans Paris (3:23)
3. Helium Heels (3:49)
4. Post Mortem, Post Boredom (2:32)
5. Wake (1:05)
6. Fall (3:05)
7. Hello Traveler (4:22)
8. Claws & Paws (4:14)
9. Catch (4:14)
10. People (2:52)
11. I Feel Fine (3:02)
12. Summer's Here (3:20)

== Personnel ==
=== Musicians ===
- Tim Presley - vocals/guitar
- Rob Barbato - vocals/bass guitar
- Jared Everett - guitar
- Andy Granelli - drums

=== Other personnel ===
- Tracks 2,3,4,7,8,10,11,12 recorded at: Wet and Dry Studios (L.A.) by Francis Miranda
- Tracks 1,5,6,9 recorded at: Hyde Street Studios (S.F.) by Drew Fisher
- All songs mixed by: Darker My Love and Drew Fisher
- All artwork by: Tim Presley
- Tracks 2,3,8 written by: Darker My Love
- Tracks 1,7,9 written by: T. Presley
- Tracks 4,5,10,11 written by: R. Barbato
- Tracks 6,12 written by: Presley/Barbato
- A&R: Jeff Castelaz / Peter Walker
- Booking: Highroad Touring
- Management: Tiger Attack! Media

== Reviews ==
AbsolutePunk.net - "This band is the perfect band for your next head trip. Echoing post-punk guitars complete with sprawling effects arch through the groups debut, taking the listener on a journey that seems only accomplish-able when under the influence... [Ultimately], while the album isn't really an experience in the vein of bands like My Bloody Valentine are in the realm of psychedelic rock, Darker My Love are on the right track to assuming a cult status in the weed-soaked culture of psychedelic rock as So-Cal fans' 'little awesome band.'"

Punknews.org - "Psych-rock has not seen a debut this solid since Jesus and Mary Chain’s Psychocandy. Originally a side project featuring members of the Distillers and Nerve Agents, California’s Darker My Love break out with a sound no one was to expect from punk rockers. The sound is fuzzy, trippy, drowned in reverb, and guitar driven... Layered, textured music is making a huge comeback, and Darker My Love are reveling in all its trappings."

Treblezine.com - "The truth is, Darker My Love, the debut album from the quartet, is so chock full of psychedelic, feedback laden goodness, that it just simply has to be the Doublestuff [of Oreos]. If you enhance the experience by turning on the lava lamp, dim the room lights and fire up that black light; you're effectively creating the Cartman favorite `quadruplestuff,' making it the ultimate DML experience. So, stop crying about a world without Kevin Shields, and how the Reid brothers will never get back together, and how there will never be another band like the Velvet Underground and pick up Darker My Love."

SpaceLab.TV - "The long awaited debut from Los Angeles' Darker My Love has arrived, and so has the band. On their self-titled debut album, they kick their sound over the top repeatedly in a very grandiose fashion. Few bands seem to capture the magic of a live performance on a recording, but these guys seem to have done it. Each track on the album oozes life and energy... it's like being at the show."
