= Cyclops Reap =

Studio album by White Fence
- Released: April 9, 2013
- Genre: Rock
- Length: 37:19
- Label: Castle Face

White Fence chronology
Family Perfume (2012)	Cyclops Reap (2013)	For The Recently Found Innocent (2014)

Professional ratings
Aggregate scores
Source	Rating
Metacritic	72/100
Review scores
Source	Rating
AllMusic	4/5 stars

Cyclops Read is the fifth studio album by American musician Tim Presley, who goes under the name White Fence. It was April 2013 under Castle Face Records.

== Track list ==
No.	Title	Length
1.	"Chairs in the Dark"	3:11
2.	"Beat"	3:19
3.	"Pink Gorilla"	2:30
4.	"Trouble Is Trouble Never Seen"	2:44
5.	"Live on Genevieve"	2:41
6.	"To the Boy I Jumped in the Hemlock Alley"	2:52
7.	"New Edinburgh"	4:23
8.	"Make Them Dinner at Our Shoes"	4:16
9.	"White Cat"	3:56
10.	"Only Man Alive"	2:54
11.	"Run by the Same"	4:34
