= Sing Sing Death House =

Studio album by the Distillers
- Released: January 29, 2002
- Recorded: April 2001
- Studios: Westbeach Recorders, Hollywood, CA
- Genre: Punk rock
- Length: 28:43
- Label: Hellcat
- Producer: The Distillers

The Distillers chronology
The Distillers (2000)	Sing Sing Death House (2002)	Coral Fang (2003)

Singles from Sing Sing Death House
- 1. "The Young Crazed Peeling" Released: 2002; 2. "City of Angels" Released: 2002

Sing Sing Death House is the second studio album by the American punk rock band the Distillers, released in 2002 on Hellcat Records. The song "Seneca Falls" was featured in the game Tony Hawk's Pro Skater 4 and is a reference to the Seneca Falls Convention of 1848.

== Recording and production ==
Sing Sing Death House was recorded in a week. Production was rushed as the band was supposed to have the album completed within two weeks. However, after their engineer disappeared during the recording sessions, the band was forced to rush the album to meet deadlines. Following its completion, Epitaph delayed its release for nine months.

== Composition and lyrics ==
The lyrics on Sing Sing Death House are more direct than on the band's self-titled debut album. This came about due to criticism of the album's nonsensical lyrics in a review written by The Village Voice, which greatly affected Brody. Brody called the review "scathing and hilarious and life-altering", but was grateful for the review's honesty.

"Young Girl" was first released on the band's self-titled debut album as a hidden track with only vocals and guitar. The song was re-recorded as a longer version with the full band and slightly different lyrics for Sing Sing Death House.

== Critical reception ==
Professional ratings
Review scores
Source	Rating
AllMusic	4/5 stars
The Encyclopedia of Popular Music	3/5 stars
Kerrang!	4/5 stars
Rolling Stone	(favorable)
Stylus	6/10

Andrew Bregman from AllMusic noted the album is "a story with an uncharacteristic ending that punks born of squalor can rise up and create music as impassioned and relatively positive as this", also calling it "authentic". In a 2003 piece called "Bands to Watch," Tim Kenneally from Spin wrote, "the band conjures the spirit of '77 with razor-bladeriffery while [Brody] shouts about urban blight, school shootings, and her troubled youth".

== Track listing ==
All tracks are written by Brody Dalle, except "Hate Me" (Dalle, Casper Mazzola).

No.	Title	Length
1.	"Sick of It All"	3:10
2.	"I Am a Revenant"	3:28
3.	"Seneca Falls"	3:01
4.	"The Young Crazed Peeling"	3:16
5.	"Sing Sing Death House"	1:43
6.	"Bullet and the Bullseye"	1:12
7.	"City of Angels"	3:29
8.	"Young Girl"	2:42
9.	"Hate Me"	1:10
10.	"Desperate"	1:22
11.	"I Understand"	1:47
12.	"Lordy Lordy"	2:19
Total length:		28:43

== Personnel ==
Credits are adapted from the album's liner notes.

The Distillers

- Brody Dalle – vocals, guitar
- Casper Mazzola – guitar, backing vocals
- Andy Outbreak – drums
- Ryan Sinn – bass, backing vocals

Production

- The Distillers – producers
- Donnell Cameron – engineer
- Dave Carlock – engineer
- Kevin Guarnieri – engineer, mixing
- Brett Gurewitz – engineer, mixing

Artwork

- Brody Dalle – artwork
- Andy Outbreak – artwork
- C.F. Martin – layout design, construction
- Paul Miner – layout design, construction
- Knowles Allen – photography

== Charts ==
Chart (2002)	Peak position
Billboard Top Independent Albums	29
