= For the Recently Found Innocent =

For The Recently Found Innocent

Studio album by White Fence
- Released: July 18, 2014
- Genre: Rock
- Length: 40:11
- Label: Drag City

White Fence chronology
Cyclops Reap (2013)	For The Recently Found Innocent (2014)	I Have to Feed Larry's Hawk (2019)

Professional ratings
Aggregate scores
Source	Rating
Metacritic	77/100
Review scores
Source	Rating
AllMusic	4/5 stars
Exclaim!	(8/10)
Paste	(7.5/10)
Pitchfork	(7.0/10)
Spin	(8/10)

For The Recently Found Innocent is the sixth studio album by American musician Tim Presley, who goes under the name White Fence. It was released in July 2014 under Drag City Records.

== Track list ==
No.	Title	Length
1.	"The Recently Found"	1:04
2.	"Anger! Who Keeps You Under?"	3:13
3.	"Like That"	2:42
4.	"Sandra (When the Earth Dies)"	2:26
5.	"Wolf Gets Red Faced"	5:09
6.	"Goodbye Law"	2:30
7.	"Arrow Man"	2:34
8.	"Actor"	2:01
9.	"Hard Water"	2:57
10.	"The Light"	2:38
11.	"Afraid of What It's Worth"	4:23
12.	"Fear"	3:00
13.	"Raven on White Cadillac"	2:45
14.	"Paranoid Bait"	2:55
