= Ghetto Love (EP) =

Ghetto Love EP

EP by Spinnerette
- Released: December 11, 2008
- Genre: Alternative rock
- Length: 14:11
- Label: Anthem Records

Spinnerette chronology
| Ghetto Love EP (2008) | Spinnerette (2009) |

Ghetto Love EP is the debut musical release from Spinnerette. It was released digitally in late 2008 through their website and Topspin Media. The EP contains four main tracks as well as a teaser mix of Spinnerette material and the music video for "Ghetto Love" (directed by Liam Lynch). "Ghetto Love" and "Distorting a Code" are also featured on their self-titled album.

== Track listing ==
1. "Ghetto Love" – 3:38
2. "Valium Knights" – 2:27
3. "Distorting a Code" – 4:10
4. "Bury My Heart" – 3:04
