= The Distillers =

American punk rock band

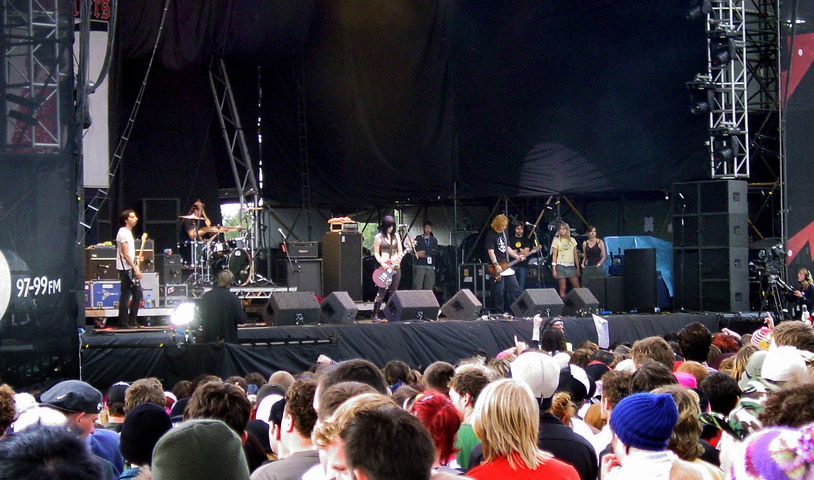
- The Distillers at the Leeds Festival 2004

Background information
- Origin: Los Angeles, California, U.S.
- Genres: Punk rock; hardcore punk; street punk
- Years active: 1998–2006; 2018–present
- Labels: Sire; Epitaph; Hellcat; Rise
- Members: Brody Dalle; Tony Bevilacqua; Andy Granelli; Ryan Sinn
- Past members: Kim Fuelleman; Matt Young; Rose Mazzola; Dante Sigona

The Distillers are an American punk rock band, formed in Los Angeles, California in 1998 by Australian vocalist and guitarist Brody Dalle. Dalle co-wrote, played guitar and provided lead vocals for nearly every track on the band's three albums. After the breakup of the band in 2006, Dalle and Distillers guitarist Tony Bevilacqua went on to form Spinnerette, before the band reformed in 2018.

== History ==
The Distillers first came together in late 1998, when Australian-born guitarist Brody Dalle met bassist Kim Chi and the two bonded over their love for playing punk rock. They proceeded to recruit Detroit guitarist Rose Mazzola and drummer Matt Young.

Signed to Epitaph, the band issued its self-titled debut in April 2000. By the end of the year, Kim Chi had left the group to join Exene Cervenka in her band, the Original Sinners. For a while The Nerve Agents bassist Dante Sigona was playing bass for The Distillers but Ryan Sinn stepped in and took position. Matt departed to join Chi while Mazzola left during the height of "Seneca Falls". By summer 2002, The Distillers were composed of Dalle, Sinn, and new drummer Andy Granelli; joint American dates with No Doubt and Garbage were planned for later that fall. Guitarist/vocalist Tony Bradley joined The Distillers in time for the recording of their third album and major-label debut, Coral Fang, which was released in 2003 by Sire. Following her very public divorce from Rancid's Tim Armstrong that same year, Brody Dalle resumed performing under her own name.

Granelli left the band in early 2005, moving on to play with Darker My Love, and by summer, Sinn had exited as well, later joining up with Angels & Airwaves. Despite rumors, The Distillers, now just Dalle and Bradley, denied that they were breaking up, instead simply going on hiatus. In early 2006, Dalle had her first child, daughter Camille, with new husband Josh Homme of Queens of the Stone Age. By the year's end, the two remaining members formally announced the band's disbandment and went on to form Spinnerette together.

In January 2018, Dalle shared a teaser video from The Distillers' Instagram and a newly opened Twitter account to confirm the return of the band. Initially, it was believed the four Twitter accounts that The Distillers' Twitter was following, would make up the 2018 line-up of the band: Dalle, Bradley, Granelli and former Spinnerette member Alain Johannes. Since then, however, the account has removed Johannes; and subsequently added former bassist Sinn. Bradley has since deleted his Twitter account.

It was later announced that the band would perform their first official show in over 13 years at The Casbah in San Diego, California in late April 2018.

On September 11, 2018, the Distillers official Instagram account announced the release of a new single available on iTunes. In April 2019, the band confirmed that they had begun recording their fourth album and follow-up to Coral Fang. On April 28, 2019, The Distillers announced they would be entering the studio with English music producer Nick Launay.

On July 16, 2021, The Distillers released a live album, Live in Lockdown. The album features nine tracks that were recorded live during their 2020 livestream. The band were booked to perform at When We Were Young in 2024; however, they announced last minute that they would not be appearing at the festival. No reason was given for their withdrawal. As of May 2025, The Distillers have not performed live publicly since January 2020.

== Band members ==
Current

- Brody Dalle – lead vocals, rhythm guitar (1998–2006, 2018–present), lead guitar (1998–1999, 2002–2003)
- Ryan Sinn – bass, backing vocals (2000–2005, 2018–present)
- Andy Granelli – drums (2000–2005, 2018–present)
- Tony "Bradley" Bevilacqua – lead guitar, backing vocals (2003–2006, 2018–present)

Former

- Rose "Casper" Mazzola – lead guitar, backing vocals (1998–2002)
- Kim "Chi" Fuelleman – bass, backing vocals (1998–2000)
- Matt Young – drums (1998–2000)
- Dante Sigona – bass, backing vocals (2000)

Timeline

== Discography ==
=== Studio albums ===
Year	Details	Peak chart positions			Certification
Year	Details	US	US Ind.	UK	Certification
2000	The Distillers: Label: Hellcat	—	—	—	
2002	Sing Sing Death House: Label: Hellcat	—	29	—	
2003	Coral Fang: Label: Sire/Hellcat	97	—	46	BPI: Silver

=== Extended plays ===
Title	Details
The Distillers EP	Released: 1999; Label: Epitaph; Formats: 7" vinyl

=== Singles ===
Title	Year	Peak chart positions					Album
Title	Year	US Alt	SCO	UK	UK Indie	UK Rock	Album
"The Young Crazed Peeling"	2002	—	—	—	—	—	Sing Sing Death House
"City of Angels"	2002	—	—	104	38	13	Sing Sing Death House
"Drain the Blood"	2003	28	48	51	—	8	Coral Fang
"The Hunger"	2004	—	—	48	—	—	Coral Fang
"Beat Your Heart Out"	2004	—	—	74	—	—	Coral Fang
"Man vs. Magnet"	2018	—	—	—	—	—	Man vs. Magnet / Blood in Gutters
"Blood in Gutters"	2018	—	—	—	—	—	Man vs. Magnet / Blood in Gutters

=== Music videos ===
- "The Young Crazed Peeling" (2002)
- "City of Angels" (2002)
- "Drain the Blood" (2003)
- "The Hunger" (2003)
- "Beat Your Heart Out" (2004)
- "Man vs. Magnet" (2018)
- "City of Angels (Live)" (2021)

== In popular culture ==
- In a February 2003 episode of Gilmore Girls, Jess surprises Rory with last-minute tickets to a Distillers concert.
- A version of the song "Muppet N.A.M.B.L.A" on the Leftöver Crack EP, Rock the 40 Oz featured Dalle on guest vocals.
- "City of Angels" is featured in the third episode of Sleeper Cell entitled "Money".
- In the Daredevil episode "Kinbaku", "Die on a Rope" is played on the stereo of a car that Matt Murdock and Elektra steal.

=== Video games ===
- "Beat Your Heart Out" is featured in Tony Hawk's Underground 2.
- "Beat Your Heart Out" is featured in ATV Offroad Fury 3.
- "Dismantle Me" is featured in MTX Mototrax.
- "Seneca Falls" is featured in Tony Hawk's Pro Skater 4.
- "Drain the Blood" is featured in Gran Turismo 4 and is a downloadable song for Rock Band.
- The song "Beat Your Heart Out" and a cover of the "Spider-Man theme song" are featured in the video game adaptation of Spider-Man 2.
- The songs "City of Angels" and "Hall of Mirrors" both featured in the 2004 game True Crime: Streets of LA.
- "City of Angels" is featured in Crash 'N' Burn.
