= Spinnerette (album) =

Studio album by Spinnerette
- Released: June 15, 2009
- Recorded: 2008–2009
- Genre: Alternative rock, indie rock
- Length: 53:57
- Label: Anthem Records (USA); Hassle Records (UK)
- Producer: Alain Johannes

Spinnerette chronology
Ghetto Love EP (2008)	Spinnerette (2009)

Professional ratings
Review scores
Source	Rating
AllMusic	3.5/5 stars
Alternative Press	9/10 stars
Antiquiet.com	4/5 stars
BBC	favorable
Drowned in Sound	6/10 stars
The Guardian	3/5 stars
NME	4/10
Pitchfork	2.7/10
Rock Sound	8/10 stars
State	4/5 stars

Spinnerette is the only studio album by Spinnerette. It was released in the UK on June 15, 2009 through Anthem Records and in the US on June 23. On June 9, Spinnerette made the entire album available for listening on their MySpace page.

== Track listing ==
1. "Ghetto Love" – 3:33
2. "All Babes Are Wolves" – 2:30
3. "Cupid" – 4:21
4. "Geeking" 4:13
5. "Baptized by Fire" – 4:35
6. "A Spectral Suspension" – 2:52
7. "Distorting a Code" – 4:06
8. "Sex Bomb" – 3:46
9. "Driving Song" – 4:30
10. "Rebellious Palpitations" – 2:40
11. "The Walking Dead" – 5:45
12. "Impaler" – 2:33
13. "A Prescription for Mankind" – 8:11

iTunes bonus track

1. "The Day My Baby Gave Me a Surprise (Devo cover)" – 2:45

== Charts ==
Chart (2009)	Peak Position
Billboard Top Heatseekers	20
Billboard Top Independent Albums	41
UK Albums (OCC)	114
