= Redemption 87 =

American hardcore punk band

- Origin: East Bay, California, U.S.
- Genres: Hardcore punk
- Years active: 1995–1999, 2004
- Spinoffs: The Nerve Agents
- Spinoff of: Unit Pride, Skankin' Pickle, Token Entry
- Past members: Jade Puget; Eric Ozenne; Gary Gutfeld; Ian Miller; Scott Hay; Tim McArdle

Redemption 87 was an American East Bay hardcore punk band containing ex-members of Unit Pride, Skankin' Pickle, and Token Entry. It also included future members of AFI and the Nerve Agents.

== History ==
In 1995 they released their first EP, The Spidey Sessions, which contained four songs. Some of these songs were also included in their 13-song first album in 1997, which was self-titled. They released their last album, All Guns Poolside, in 1999, which contained 13 songs, three of which were covers of songs by Cro-mags, Negative Approach and Bad Brains.

In 1999, the band dissolved and Jade Puget joined AFI, while Eric Ozenne formed The Nerve Agents.

== Musical style ==
Their goal was to reclaim "hardcore" from the crossover heavy metal music it had become and return it to its punk roots.

They cited influences including Youth of Today, Gorilla Biscuits, Bold, 7 Seconds, Uniform Choice, Judge, Agnostic Front, Madball, Antidote, Cro-Mags, Sick of It All, T.S.O.L., Dag Nasty, Bad Religion, Descendents, Ignite, Fugazi, Minor Threat, Bad Brains, Circle Jerks, Dead Kennedys, D.I., Minutemen, Snapcase, Subhumans, Talking Heads, PJ Harvey, Hildur Guðnadóttir, Aldous Harding and Nomeansno.

== Members ==
- Eric Ozenne – vocals
- Scott Hay – guitar
- Tim McArdle – guitar
- Jade Puget – guitar
- Ian Miller – bass
- Gary Gutfeld –drums
