= Tim Presley =

American musician, singer and songwriter

- Presley performing in 2013

Background information
- Born: California
- Genres: Garage rock, psychedelic rock, experimental, lo-fi
- Occupations: Singer-songwriter, musician
- Instruments: Vocals, guitar, bass, keyboards
- Years active: 1996–present
- Labels: Castle Face, Woodsist Records, Drag City Records, Heavenly Recordings

Tim Presley is an American singer and songwriter. Presley began his career playing with the hardcore punk bands Model American and The Nerve Agents. In 2004, Presley founded the psychedelic rock band Darker My Love. In 2006 he joined The Fall, playing on the LP Reformation Post TLC, and was an occasional guest musician on the band's later albums. Since 2010, Presley has released music under the name White Fence. As of January 2019, he has released seven studio albums, two live albums, and two collaborative albums with Ty Segall under that name, as well as two albums with Cate Le Bon under the name DRINKS, an experimental solo album under the name W-X, and a solo album, THE WiNK, under his own name.

== White Fence ==
Presley began recording music in his apartment using primitive and low cost equipment, while still a member of Darker My Love. Presley's debut White Fence album, self-titled White Fence, was recorded between 2008 and 2009. The album was released in 2010 on Make A Mess Records, receiving generally positive reviews.

Presley's second album, entitled Is Growing Faith, was released in 2011 through Woodsist Records. The album continued upon Presley's lo-fi and psychedelic sound, and contained a cover of Johnny Thunders 1978 song "You Can't Put Your Arms Around a Memory." The album gathered similarly positive reviews, noting Presley's developing instrumentation and experimentation. The same year, a live cassette entitled White Fence – Live in LA, was released through the Teenage Teardrops label. The cassette was only limited to 200 copies.

2012 saw Presley release three records; two as White Fence and one in collaboration with Ty Segall. The first, Family Perfume Vol. 1, was released on April 3, 2012. The album was the first installment in a double release from Presley. The second volume, Family Perfume Vol. 2, was subsequently released on May 15, 2012. Both albums were released through Woodsist Records and limited to 1000 copies each during its first pressing. The final release of 2012 was a collaboration with fellow California based musician Ty Segall. The album, entitled Hair, similarly followed the same psychedelic and garage rock tendencies of Presley and Segall's respective previous works. The album was released on April 24, 2012, and was recorded and produced by Eric Bauer.

In 2013, Presley released his fifth album as White Fence, entitled Cyclops Reap. The album was originally intended to be a release of Presley's older work from his previous four albums; however, he instead decided to create an album of new material. The album followed the same production techniques as his previous work, and was recorded on a 4-track in Presley's bedroom. Castle Face Records released the album in various formats, such as colour vinyl and on Flexi disc. The album received positive reviews.

Presley's sixth album as White Fence, For the Recently Found Innocent was released in July 2014. The album differs from previous releases as it makes use of studio recordings rather than bedroom recording, creating a more polished sound. The album was mixed by collaborator Ty Segall.

In 2018, Presley released his second collaborative White Fence album with Ty Segall, entitled Joy.

I Have to Feed Larry's Hawk, the seventh White Fence studio album, was released on Drag City Records in January 2019.

The first White Fence album in seven years, Orange, was released in 2026.

== Other projects ==
In 2015, Hermits on Holiday — Presley's first album with Cate Le Bon under their collaborative name DRINKS — was released on Heavenly Recordings. A second DRINKS album, Hippo Lite, written and recorded by the duo during a month on holiday in Saint-Hippolyte-du-Fort in the south of France, was released on Drag City in 2018.

Later in 2015, Presley released the eponymous W-X, a 20-track, double LP under the same name. Largely instrumental, W-X leans further into abstraction than Presley'a previous work, drawing comparisons to Captain Beefheart and Ariel Pink. In 2020, more than 5 years later, a single titled "I CAN HEAR MYSELF NOW" would also be released under the W-X moniker.

Further to his output as White Fence and DRINKS, Presley released an album titled THE WiNK under his own name in 2016, via Drag City. The album was produced by Cate Le Bon.

Presley is also the founder of Birth Records, which releases the music of San Francisco-based folk singer Jessica Pratt.

In addition to his musical pursuits, Presley produces work in a visual medium, and has created the cover art for several of his own albums. A book of Presley's art and poetry, titled Under the Banner of Concern, was published by Mexican Summer book imprint Anthology Editions in August 2020, following the previously published You Don’t Have Eyes Yet (2010) and Mush (2016).

== Discography ==
=== White Fence studio albums ===
White Fence

- Released: 2010
- Label: Make A Mess Records
- Writer: Tim Presley
- Producer: Tim Presley

Is Growing Faith

- Released: 2011
- Label: Woodsist Records
- Writer: Tim Presley
- Producer: Tim Presley

Family Perfume Vol. 1

- Released: 2012
- Label: Woodsist Records
- Writer: Tim Presley
- Producer: Tim Presley

Family Perfume Vol. 2

- Released: 2012
- Label: Woodsist Records
- Writer: Tim Presley
- Producer: Tim Presley

Cyclops Reap

- Released: 2013
- Label: Castleface Records
- Writer: Tim Presley
- Producer: Tim Presley

For the Recently Found Innocent

- Released: 2014
- Label: Drag City
- Writer: Tim Presley
- Producer: Tim Presley

I Have to Feed Larry's Hawk

- Released: 2019
- Label: Drag City
- Writer: Tim Presley
- Producer: Tim Presley

Orange

- Released: 2026
- Label: Drag City
- Writer: Tim Presley
- Producer: Ty Segall

=== With Ty Segall ===
Hair

- Released: 2012
- Label: Drag City
- Writer: Tim Presley, Ty Segall
- Producer: Eric Bauer

Joy

- Released: 2018
- Label: Drag City
- Writer: Tim Presley, Ty Segall

=== Solo albums ===
THE WiNK

- Released: 2016
- Label: Drag City
- Writer: Tim Presley, Cate Le Bon
- Producer: Cate Le Bon

=== As DRINKS ===
Hermits on Holiday

- Released: 2015
- Label: Heavenly Recordings
- Writer: Tim Presley, Cate Le Bon

Hippo Lite

- Released: 2018
- Label: Drag City
- Writer: Tim Presley, Cate Le Bon

=== As W-X ===
W-X

- Released: 2015
- Label: Castle Face Records
- Writer: Tim Presley

I Can Hear Myself Now

- Released: 2020
- Writer: Tim Presley
