= All Guns Poolside =

Studio album by Redemption 87
- Released: 1998; 2002 reissue
- Recorded: January – February 1997; California, U.S.
- Genre: Hardcore punk
- Length: 18:51; 27:41 reissue
- Label: Blackout Records
- Producers: Andy Ernst; Redemption 87

All Guns Poolside is an album by the now defunct hardcore punk band, Redemption 87.

It was released in 1998 and subsequently re-released in 2002 by Blackout Records – with added bonus tracks which were the band's original demo from 1995.

It features vocalist, Eric Ozenne, who went on to form The Nerve Agents and Jade Puget who joined hardcore punk band, AFI, who are now an alternative rock band.

== Track listing ==
- All songs written by Redemption 87, unless stated
1. "The Plague" – 1:48
2. "Stand" – 2:49
3. "A Dying Love Song" – 1:46
4. "Reflect" – 2:04
5. "How Can We Hide?" – 2:21
6. "What's New?" – 0:09
7. "G.T.M.C." – 2:22
8. "Tied Down" (Negative Approach) – 1:34
9. "The Big Takeover" (Bad Brains) – 2:32
10. "Hard Times" (Cro-Mags) – 1:24
11. "Spidey's Song" – 1:40
12. "Masquerade" – 1:32
13. "Can't Break Me" – 5:38
- Tracks 11–13 were on the 2002 reissue. They were original demo songs from 1995.

== Credits ==
=== Tracks 1–10 ===
- Eric "87" Ozenne – vocals
- Jade Puget – guitar
- Ian Miller – bass
- Gary Gutfeld – drums
- Recorded January – February, 1997
- Produced by Andy Ernst and Redemption 87, except track 10 by Redemption 87
- Engineered by Andy Ernst, except track 10 by Craig Knepp
- Assistant engineered by Ian Miller
- Cover photographs by Rachel Ozenne

=== Tracks 11–13 ===
- Eric Ozenne – vocals
- Timmy Chunks – guitar
- Ian Miller – bass
- Gary Gutfeld – drums
- Recorded Summer, 1995
- Produced by Lars Frederiksen
- Engineered by Jeremy Goody

== See also ==
- The Nerve Agents – Eric Ozenne's next band
- AFI (A Fire Inside) – Jade Puget's current band
