= Family Perfume =

Family Perfume, Vol. 1

Studio album by White Fence
- Released: April 3, 2012
- Genre: Psychedelic rock, lo-fi, garage rock
- Label: Woodsist
- Producer: Tim Presley

Family Perfume, Vol. 2

Studio album by White Fence
- Released: May 15, 2012
- Genre: Psychedelic rock, lo-fi, garage rock
- Label: Woodsist
- Producer: Tim Presley

Family Perfume is a double album by Tim Presley under the name White Fence. The first album, Family Perfume, Vol. 1 was released on April 3, 2012, and its followup, Family Perfume, Vol. 2, was released a month later on May 15, 2012. Each album was limited to a run of 1,000 copies.

== Track listing ==
=== Family Perfume, Vol. 1 ===
Professional ratings
Aggregate scores
Source	Rating
Metacritic	72/100
Review scores
Source	Rating
BPM	78%
Pitchfork	7.6/10

All tracks are written by Tim Presley, except where noted.

No.	Title	Writer(s)	Length
1.	"WF FP Intro"	Tim Presley	0:18
2.	"Swagger vets & Double moon"	Tim Presley	2:29
3.	"Long white curtain"	Tim Presley	2:15
4.	"Balance yr heart"	Tim Presley	4:26
5.	"Do you know Ida Know?"	Tim Presley	3:08
6.	"Down PNX"	Tim Presley	2:21
7.	"Take away lifes endless take"	Tim Presley	2:31
8.	"Hope! Servatude, i have no!"	Tim Presley	2:56
9.	"It will never be"	Tim Presley	6:48
10.	"Soaring, daily pique number 2"	Tim Presley	1:37
11.	"A Hermes Blues"	Tim Presley	2:11
12.	"Hey! Roman nose"	Tim Presley	2:40
13.	"Breathe Again"	Tim Presley	2:46
14.	"Daily Pique"	Tim Presley	3:22

=== Family Perfume, Vol. 2 ===
Professional ratings
Aggregate scores
Source	Rating
Metacritic	77/100
Review scores
Source	Rating
Pitchfork	7.2/10
AllMusic	3.5/5 stars

All tracks are written by Tim Presley, except where noted.

No.	Title	Writer(s)	Length
1.	"Groundskeeper Rag (Man's Man)"	Tim Presley	1:26
2.	"She Relief"	Tim Presley	2:56
3.	"I'd Sing"	Tim Presley	2:48
4.	"Real Smiles"	Tim Presley	2:00
5.	"Lizards First"	Tim Presley	2:58
6.	"It's Confusing when you wake up"	Tim Presley	2:25
7.	"Upstart Girls"	Tim Presley	2:36
8.	"Stomach Sexes"	Tim Presley	2:41
9.	"A Good Night"	Tim Presley	2:13
10.	"Latchkeys"	Tim Presley	1:54
11.	"Anna"	Tim Presley	3:26
12.	"Be At Home"	Tim Presley	2:52
13.	"Makers"	Tim Presley	3:10
14.	"Tame"	Tim Presley	2:31
15.	"King Of The Decade"	Tim Presley	4:49

== Reception ==
Critical reception has been mixed to positive. Volume 1 currently holds a rating of 72 (based upon 8 reviews) on Metacritic and Volume 2's rating is 77 (based on 5 reviews). Pitchfork Media gave an overall favorable review for both volumes, but remarked that the first volume was "the most consistent of the pair". CMJ.com also gave a mixed review, commenting that "The unpredictable mix incites some strange transitions, occasionally cutting off promising grooves to the album’s detriment (“Groundskeeper Rag,” especially, peaks prematurely). But what Family Perfume lacks in momentum it makes up for in brevity, never lingering on one motif for more than two or three minutes before skipping enthusiastically into the next like an overeager basement party DJ."
