= Tony Scott =

English filmmaker (1944–2012)

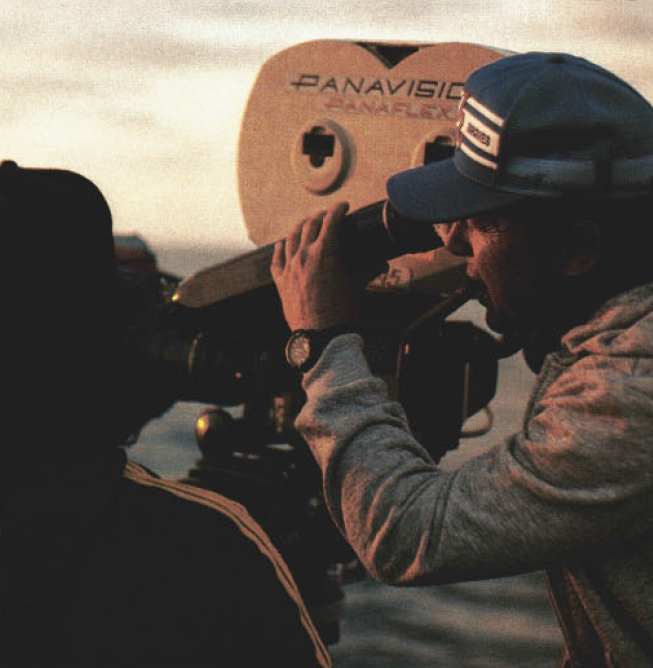
- Scott while filming Top Gun (1986) in 1985
- Born: Anthony David Leighton Scott; 21 June 1944; Tynemouth, England
- Died: 19 August 2012 (aged 68); Los Angeles, California, US
- Resting place: Hollywood Forever Cemetery
- Education: Royal College of Art
- Occupations: Director; producer
- Years active: 1965–2012
- Spouses: Gerry Boldy (m. 1967; div. 1974) Glynis Staunton (m. 1986; div. 1987) Donna W. Wilson (m. 1994)
- Children: 2
- Relatives: Ridley Scott (brother); Jake Scott (nephew); Jordan Scott (niece); Luke Scott (nephew)

Anthony David Leighton Scott (21 June 1944 – 19 August 2012) was an English filmmaker. He made his theatrical film debut with The Hunger (1983) and went on to direct highly successful action and thriller films such as Top Gun (1986), Beverly Hills Cop II (1987), Days of Thunder (1990), The Last Boy Scout (1991), True Romance (1993), Crimson Tide (1995), Enemy of the State (1998), Man on Fire (2004), Déjà Vu (2006), The Taking of Pelham 123 (2009), and Unstoppable (2010).

Scott was the younger brother of film director Ridley Scott. They both graduated from the Royal College of Art in London, and were among a generation of British film directors who were successful in Hollywood having started their careers making television commercials. In 1995, both Tony and Ridley received the BAFTA Award for Outstanding British Contribution To Cinema. In 2010, they received the BAFTA Britannia Award for Worldwide Contribution to Filmed Entertainment.

Along with Hugh Hudson, Adrian Lyne, Alan Parker, and brother Ridley Scott, Scott was part of the "Adland Five" of British directors operating in the late 1970s and early 1980s who first established themselves in the advertising world before going on to Hollywood success. The group's influence has been cited by the likes of Christopher Nolan and Christopher Frayling.

== Early life and education ==
Scott was born in Tynemouth, at the time in Northumberland, now in North Tyneside, North East England, the youngest of three sons of Elizabeth (née Williams) and Colonel Francis Percy Scott, who served in the Royal Engineers. Dixon Scott, a grand uncle, was a pioneer of the cinema chain, opening cinemas around Tyneside. One Tyneside Cinema, in Newcastle, is the last remaining newsreel cinema operating in the United Kingdom. Tony was a pupil at Rosebank School in Hartlepool, West Hartlepool College of Art and graduating from Sunderland Art School with a fine arts degree. At the age of 16, he appeared in the short film Boy and Bicycle, Ridley's directorial debut (he was 23). He was a player of Stockton Rugby Football Club's junior Colts team in the 1960s, and later became the club's patron.

Tony Scott continued his studies in art in Leeds after failing to gain admission to the Royal College of Art in London (he would succeed in a later attempt). In 1969, he made a short film based on the Ambrose Bierce story "One of the Missing". As Ridley had previously cast him in a film, Tony reciprocated by giving his brother a role in the production. "The film cost £1,000", he recalled in April 2012. While at the Royal College of Art, where he was taught by Raymond Durgnat, he starred in "Don't Walk", a film by fellow students Hank Onrust and Richard Stanley. The film credits state it was "made for BUNAC by MARCA films at the Royal College of Art". Again following in Ridley's footsteps, Tony graduated from the Royal College of Art, although he intended to become a painter. Their eldest brother Frank had earlier joined the British Merchant Navy.

== Career ==
=== Commercials ===
The success of his elder brother's fledgling television commercial production outfit, Ridley Scott Associates (RSA), drew Tony's attention to film. Ridley recounted, "Tony had wanted to do documentaries at first. I told him, 'Don't go to the BBC, come to me first.' I knew that he had a fondness for cars, so I told him, 'Come work with me and within a year you'll have a Ferrari.' And he did!" Tony recalled, "I was finishing eight years at art school, and Ridley had opened Ridley Scott Associates and said, 'Come and make commercials and make some money' because I owed money left and right and centre." He directed many television commercials for RSA while also overseeing the company's operation while his brother was developing his feature film career. "My goal was to make films but I got sidetracked into commercials and then I took off. I had 15 years [making them], and it was a blast. We were very prolific, and that was our training ground. You'd shoot 100 days in a year, then we gravitated from that to film," he said. Developing his own distinctive visual style while making commercials, Scott states, "I cornered the market in sexy, rock'n'roll stuff."

Scott took time out in 1975 to direct a television adaptation of the Henry James story The Author of Beltraffio. After the feature film successes of fellow British directors Hugh Hudson, Alan Parker, Adrian Lyne and his elder brother during the late 1970s, all of whom had graduated from directing advertising commercials, he received initial overtures from Hollywood in 1980. His eldest brother Frank died, aged 45, of skin cancer during the same year.

=== Early films ===
Scott reflected on his career in 2009:

The '80s was a whole era. We were criticised, we being the Brits coming over, because we were out of advertising—Alan Parker, Hugh Hudson, Adrian Lyne, my brother—we were criticised about style over content. Jerry Bruckheimer was very bored of the way American films were very traditional and classically done. Jerry was always looking for difference. That's why I did six movies with Jerry. He always applauded the way I wanted to approach things. That period in the '80s was a period when I was constantly being criticised, and my press was horrible. I never read any press after The Hunger.

Scott persisted in trying to embark on a feature film career. Among the ideas interesting to him was an adaptation of the Anne Rice novel Interview with the Vampire then in development. MGM was already developing the vampire film The Hunger, and hired Scott as director in 1982. Despite starring David Bowie, Susan Sarandon and Catherine Deneuve, and having elaborate production design, it failed to find an audience or to impress the critics although it later became a cult favourite. Finding few film opportunities in Hollywood over the next two and a half years, Scott returned to commercials and music videos.

In 1985, producers Don Simpson and Jerry Bruckheimer collaborated with Scott to direct Top Gun, having been impressed by The Hunger, and a commercial he had done for Swedish automaker Saab in 1983 featuring a Saab 900 racing a Saab 37 Viggen fighter jet. Scott, initially reluctant, finally agreed to direct Top Gun. While the film received mixed critical reviews, it was a box office smash, becoming the highest-grossing film of 1986, taking in more than $350 million, and making a star of its young protagonist, Tom Cruise. Labelling Top Gun "the key 1980s movie made by the British ad invasion", Sam Delaney of The Guardian writes, "By the mid-80's, Hollywood was awash with British directors who had ushered in a new era of blockbusters using the crowd-pleasing skills they'd honed in advertising. The vast resources and freedom made available to ad directors during advertising's boom era during the 1970s enabled them to innovate and experiment with new techniques that weren't then possible in TV or film."

=== Hollywood success ===
Following the stellar success of Top Gun, Scott found himself on Hollywood's A-list of action directors. He collaborated again with Simpson and Bruckheimer in 1987 to direct Eddie Murphy and Brigitte Nielsen in the highly anticipated sequel Beverly Hills Cop II. It left critics underwhelmed, but was among the year's highest-grossing films. That year, in 1987, Tony Scott had signed a deal with Paramount Pictures to develop films for a non-exclusive agreement, which will serve as producers and directors on the studio. His next feature, Revenge (1990), a thriller of adultery and revenge set in Mexico, starred Kevin Costner, Madeleine Stowe and Anthony Quinn. Once again directing Tom Cruise, Scott returned to the Simpson-Bruckheimer fold to helm the big-budget racing film Days of Thunder (1990). Scott later stated that it was difficult to find the drama in racing cars in circles, so he "stole from all race movies to date ... then tried to build on them." Scott's next film was the cult action thriller The Last Boy Scout (1991) starring Bruce Willis and Damon Wayans and written by Shane Black.

In 1993, Scott directed True Romance costing just $13 million, from a script by Quentin Tarantino. The cast included Christian Slater, Patricia Arquette, Dennis Hopper, Christopher Walken, Gary Oldman, Brad Pitt, Tom Sizemore, Chris Penn, Val Kilmer, James Gandolfini and Samuel L. Jackson. Although it received positive reviews from Janet Maslin and other critics, it earned less than it cost to make and was considered a box office failure, although it has since attained cult status. For his next film, Crimson Tide (1995), Scott again teamed up with producers Don Simpson and Jerry Bruckheimer. A submarine thriller starring Denzel Washington and Gene Hackman, it was critically and commercially well-received. It marked the first of five collaborations with Washington.

In 1995, Shepperton Studios was purchased by a consortium headed by Tony and Ridley Scott, which extensively renovated the studios – located in Britain – while also expanding and improving its grounds. In 1996, Scott directed The Fan, starring Robert De Niro, Wesley Snipes, Ellen Barkin and Benicio del Toro. His 1998 film Enemy of the State, a conspiracy thriller, starred Will Smith and Gene Hackman, and was his highest-grossing film of the decade. Spy Game was released in November 2001, and garnered 63% positive reviews at Metacritic and topped $60 million at the U.S. box office. Scott subsequently directed another thriller starring Denzel Washington, Man on Fire, released in April 2004.

Tony collaborated with Ridley to co-produce the TV series Numb3rs, which aired from 2005 to 2010, with Tony directing the first episode of the fourth season. In 2006, he contributed voice-over to a song called Dreamstalker on Hybrid's album I Choose Noise; Scott collaborated with Hybrid on several films through their mutual friend, the highly successful film score composer Harry Gregson-Williams.

In 2005, Tony Scott directed Domino, starring Keira Knightley. While notable for its use of experimental film techniques, it was drubbed by critics and rejected by audiences. In autumn 2006, Scott again worked with Denzel Washington, this time on a sci-fi action film, Déjà Vu. The two collaborated again on The Taking of Pelham 123, a remake of the 1974 film of the same title, and which also starred John Travolta. It was released on 12 June 2009. In 2009, Tony and Ridley Scott were executive producers for The Good Wife, a legal drama television series.

In 2010, the Scott brothers produced the feature film adaptation of the television series The A-Team. The same year, Scott collaborated again with Denzel Washington on Unstoppable, which also starred Chris Pine, and hit the screens in November.

Shortly before his death, Tony Scott produced Coma, a medical thriller miniseries, the Coca-Cola short film The Polar Bears and the thrillers Stoker and The East, the latter two with his brother, Ridley.

=== Unrealised projects ===
Tom Cruise was with Scott just two days prior to the director's suicide, scouting locations for a sequel to Top Gun, scheduled for production in 2013. In December 2012, Paramount announced that the project was officially cancelled, but they would go ahead with a 3D IMAX remastering of the original Top Gun, which was released on 8 February 2013. In June 2013, it was confirmed by Bruckheimer that Top Gun 2 had been greenlighted once again, with Joseph Kosinski announced as the project's new director in June 2017. The film, Top Gun: Maverick, was released on 27 May 2022, and was both a critical and financial success, and is the second-highest grossing film of 2022. Top Gun: Maverick was posthumously dedicated to Scott.

At the time of his death, Scott was also slated to direct Narco Sub, from a script by David Guggenheim and Mark Bomback, about "a disgraced American naval officer forced to pilot a sub carrying a payload of cocaine to America", and the action film Lucky Strike, with Vince Vaughn slated to star. Scott also considered a remake of the classic western The Wild Bunch (1969), and an adaptation of the comic book limited series Nemesis by Mark Millar.

== Directing style ==
Katey Rich of Cinema Blend wrote that Scott had a "trademark frenetic camera style", which Scott spoke about in June 2009, in reference to The Taking of Pelham 123:

It's about energy and it's about momentum, and I think the movie's very exciting, and it's not one individual thing. The true excitement comes from the actors—that gives you the true drama—and whatever I can do with the camera, that's icing on the cake. I wanted the movie to grab you. I use four cameras and I maybe do three takes—so the actors love it. Maybe I move it more than I should, but that's the nature of the way I am.

Scott also spoke about his career in general:

What always leads me in terms of my movies are characters. [I tell my production team] 'Go into the real world, cast these people in the real world, and find me role models for my writers.' Then I reverse-engineer. I don't change the structure of the script, but I use my research. That's always been my mantra, and that's what gets me excited, because I get to educate and entertain myself in terms of worlds I could never normally touch, other than the fact that I'm a director. [...] If you look at my body of work, there's always a dark side to my characters. They've always got a skeleton in the closet, they've always got a subtext. I like that. Whether it's Bruce Willis in Last Boy Scout or Denzel Washington in The Taking of Pelham 123. I think fear, and there's two ways of looking at fear. The most frightening thing I do in my life is getting up and shooting movies. Commercials, movies, every morning I'm bolt upright on one hour two hours sleep, before the alarm clock goes off. That's a good thing. That fear motivates me, and I enjoy that fear. I'm perverse in that way. I do other things. I've rock climbed all my life. Whenever I finish a movie, I do multi-day ascents, I go hang on a wall in Yosemite. That fear is tangible. That's black and white. I can make this hold or that hold. The other fear is intangible, it's very abstract, and that's more frightening.

Manohla Dargis of The New York Times wrote that Scott was "one of the most influential film directors of the past 25 years, if also one of the most consistently and egregiously underloved by critics" and called him "[o]ne of the pop futurists of the contemporary blockbuster." She felt that "[t]here was plenty about his work that was problematic and at times offensive, yet it could have terrific pop, vigour, beauty and a near pure cinema quality. These were, more than anything, films by someone who wanted to pull you in hard and never let you go."

Owen Gleiberman of Entertainment Weekly wrote that "the propulsive, at times borderline preposterous popcorn-thriller storylines; the slice-and-dice editing and the images that somehow managed to glow with grit; the fireball violence, often glimpsed in smeary-techno telephoto shots; the way he had of making actors seem volatile and dynamic and, at the same time, lacking almost any subtext" were qualities of Scott's films that both "excited audiences about his work" and "kept him locked outside the gates of critical respectability."

Todd McCarthy of The Hollywood Reporter wrote that after Top Gun, Scott "found his commercial niche as a brash, flashy, sometimes vulgar action painter on celluloid," citing Beverly Hills Cop II, Days of Thunder, The Last Boy Scout, True Romance, and The Fan as examples. McCarthy concluded that Unstoppable, Scott's final film, was one of his best. Apart from having "its director's fingerprints all over it—the commitment to extreme action, frenetic cutting, stripped-down dialogue"—McCarthy found "a social critique embedded in its guts; it was about disconnected working class stiffs living marginal lives on society's sidings, about the barely submerged anger of a neglected underclass," something which "always had been lacking from Tony Scott's work, some connection to the real world rather than just silly flyboy stuff and meaningful glances accompanied by this year's pop music hit." Betsy Sharkey of The Los Angeles Times wrote that Denzel Washington—who starred in Crimson Tide, Man on Fire, Déjà Vu, The Taking of Pelham 123, and Unstoppable—was Scott's muse, and Scott "was at his best when Washington was in the picture. The characters the actor played are the archetype of the kind of men Scott made. At their core, and what guided all the actions that followed, was a fundamental decency. They were flawed men to be sure, some more than others, but men who accorded dignity to anyone who deserved it."

== Personal life ==
Scott married three times. His first marriage was to TV production designer Gerry Boldy (1944–2007) in 1967; they were divorced in 1974. His second marriage was in 1986 to advertising executive Glynis Sanders; they divorced a year later when his affair with Brigitte Nielsen (married to Sylvester Stallone at the time), whom he met on the set of Beverly Hills Cop II, became public. He subsequently met film and TV actress Donna Wilson on the set of Days of Thunder in 1990 and they married in 1994. She gave birth to their twin sons in 2000.

== Death ==
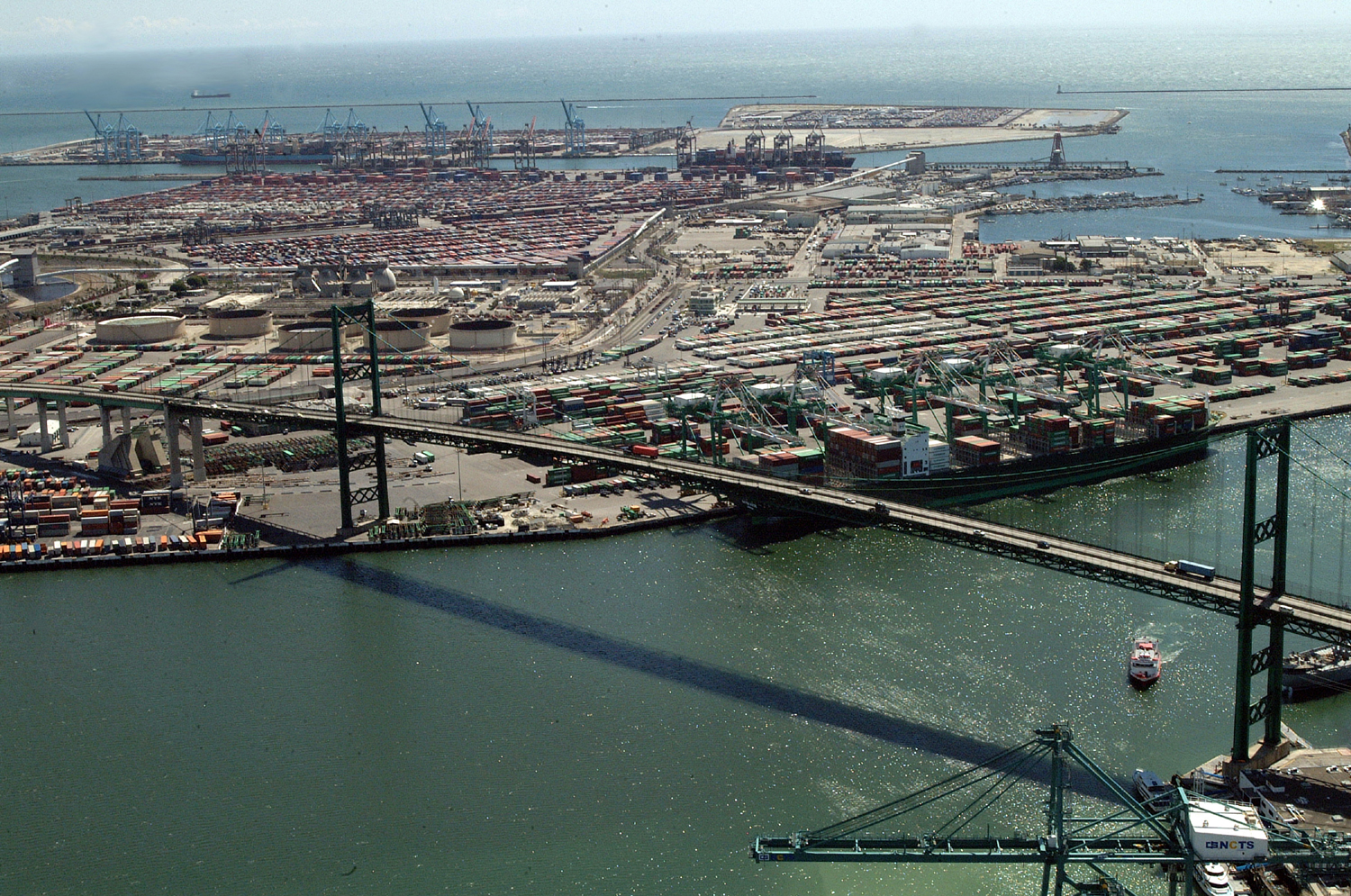
Scott jumped from the Vincent Thomas Bridge to his death.

On 19 August 2012, at approximately 12:30 p.m. PDT, Scott jumped off the Vincent Thomas Bridge in the San Pedro port district of Los Angeles. Investigators from the Los Angeles Police Department's Harbor Division found contact information in a note left in his car, parked on the bridge, and a note at his office for his family. One witness said he did not hesitate before jumping, but another said he looked nervous before climbing a fence, hesitating for two seconds before jumping. He landed beside a tour boat. His body was recovered from the water by the Los Angeles Port Police. On 22 August, Los Angeles County coroner's spokesman Ed Winters said the two notes Scott left behind made no mention of any health problems, but neither the police nor the family disclosed the content of those notes.

On 22 October 2012, the Los Angeles County Coroner's Office announced the cause of death as "multiple blunt force injuries". Therapeutic levels of the antidepressant mirtazapine and the sleep aid eszopiclone were in his system at the time of death. A coroner's official said Scott "did not have any serious underlying medical conditions" and that there was "no anatomic evidence of neoplasia [cancer] identified".

In a November 2014 interview with Variety, Ridley Scott described his brother's death as "inexplicable", saying that Tony had been "fighting a lengthy battle with cancer—a diagnosis the family elected to keep private during his treatments and in the immediate wake of his death", yet mentioning "his recovery". A November 2023 profile of Ridley Scott by The New Yorker mentions that Tony Scott called his brother, who was filming in France, moments before jumping from the bridge. Noticing that he was downbeat but unaware of the situation Tony was facing, Ridley tried to energise him about work: "I said, 'Have you made your mind up about this film yet? Get going! Let's get you into a movie.'"

=== Funeral and legacy ===
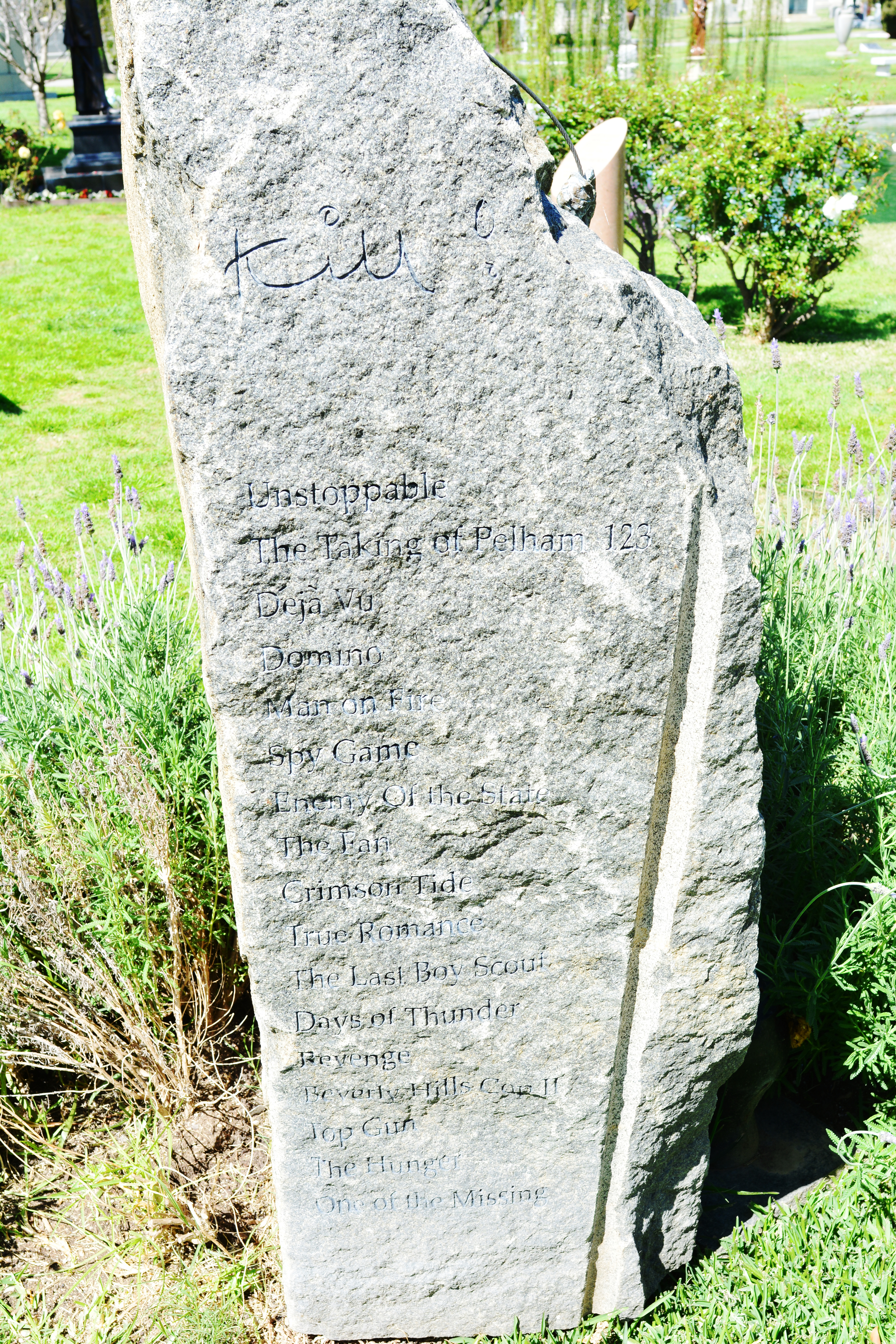
Scott's grave at the Hollywood Forever Cemetery

The family established a scholarship fund at the American Film Institute in Scott's name, stating, "The family ask that in lieu of flowers, donations be made to the fund to help encourage and engage future generations of filmmakers." He was cremated and his ashes were interred at Hollywood Forever Cemetery on 24 August in Los Angeles. He left his estate to his family trust.

Many actors paid tribute to him, including Tom Cruise, Christian Slater, Val Kilmer, Eddie Murphy, Denzel Washington, Gene Hackman, Elijah Wood, Dane Cook, Dwayne Johnson, Stephen Fry, Peter Fonda and Keira Knightley, as well as musical collaborators Hybrid. Cruise complimented Scott as "a creative visionary whose mark on film is immeasurable." Denzel Washington, Scott's most frequent acting collaborator, said, "Tony Scott was a great director, a genuine friend and it is unfathomable to think that he is now gone." Directors UK chairman Charles Sturridge said Scott was "a brilliant British director with an extraordinary ability to create energy on screen, both in action and in the creation of character."

The first episode of Coma and the first episode of season 4 of The Good Wife were dedicated to his memory, as were his brother Ridley's films The Counselor and Exodus: Gods and Kings. Ridley also paid tribute to Tony at the 2016 Golden Globes, after his film, The Martian, won Best Motion Picture – Musical or Comedy.

The end credits of Top Gun: Maverick (2022) include a dedication to Scott. Lady Gaga's performance of the film's Academy Award-nominated song "Hold My Hand" at the 95th Academy Awards likewise included a tribute to the late director. He had been working on early drafts of the film before his death.

== Filmography ==
=== Films ===
Feature films

Year	Title	Director	Producer
1983	The Hunger	Yes	No
1986	Top Gun	Yes	No
1987	Beverly Hills Cop II	Yes	No
1990	Revenge	Yes	No
1990	Days of Thunder	Yes	No
1991	The Last Boy Scout	Yes	No
1993	True Romance	Yes	No
1995	Crimson Tide	Yes	No
1996	The Fan	Yes	No
1998	Enemy of the State	Yes	No
2001	Spy Game	Yes	No
2004	Man on Fire	Yes	Yes
2005	Domino	Yes	Yes
2006	Déjà Vu	Yes	No
2009	The Taking of Pelham 123	Yes	Yes
2010	Unstoppable	Yes	Yes

Mid-length films

Year	Title	Director	Writer	Notes
1970	Loving Memory	Yes	Yes	Also cinematographer and editor
1976	The Author of Beltraffio	Yes	No	Produced for the French television anthology series Nouvelles de Henry James

Short films

Year	Title	Director	Producer	Writer	Notes
1969	One of the Missing	Yes	No	Yes	Also cinematographer and editor
2002	Beat the Devil	Yes	Executive	No	Segment of The Hire
2004	Agent Orange	Yes	No	No	Part of the Amazon Theater suite of short films
2012	The Polar Bears	No	Yes	No	

=== Television ===
Director

Year	Title	Episodes
1997–1999	The Hunger	"The Swords" and "Sanctuary"
2007	Numb3rs	"Trust Metric"

Executive producer

- AFP: American Fighter Pilot (2002)
- The Gathering Storm (2002)
- The Good Wife (2009–12)
- Gettysburg (2011)
- Labyrinth (2012)
- World Without End (2012)
- Killing Lincoln (2013)

Producer

- Stoker (2013)

=== Others ===
Music videos

- "Danger Zone" – Kenny Loggins (1986)
- "Father Figure" – George Michael (1987) directed by Andy Morahan, the love scene shot by Tony Scott
- "One More Try" – George Michael (1988)
- "Avalon" - Roxy Music

Commercials

- DIM Underwear (1979)
- SAAB (1984) "Nothing on Earth Comes Close"
- Player, Achievements and Big Bang for Barclays Bank (2000)
- Telecom Italia (2000) (Starring Marlon Brando and Woody Allen)
- Ice Soldier for US Army (2002)
- One Man, One Land for Marlboro (2003)

== See also ==
- Tony Scott's unrealised projects
- Scott Free Productions

== Bibliography ==
- Gerosa, Mario ed. (2014). Il cinema di Tony Scott. Il Foglio. ISBN 9788876064814.
