= The Realm of the Unreal =

1890 short story

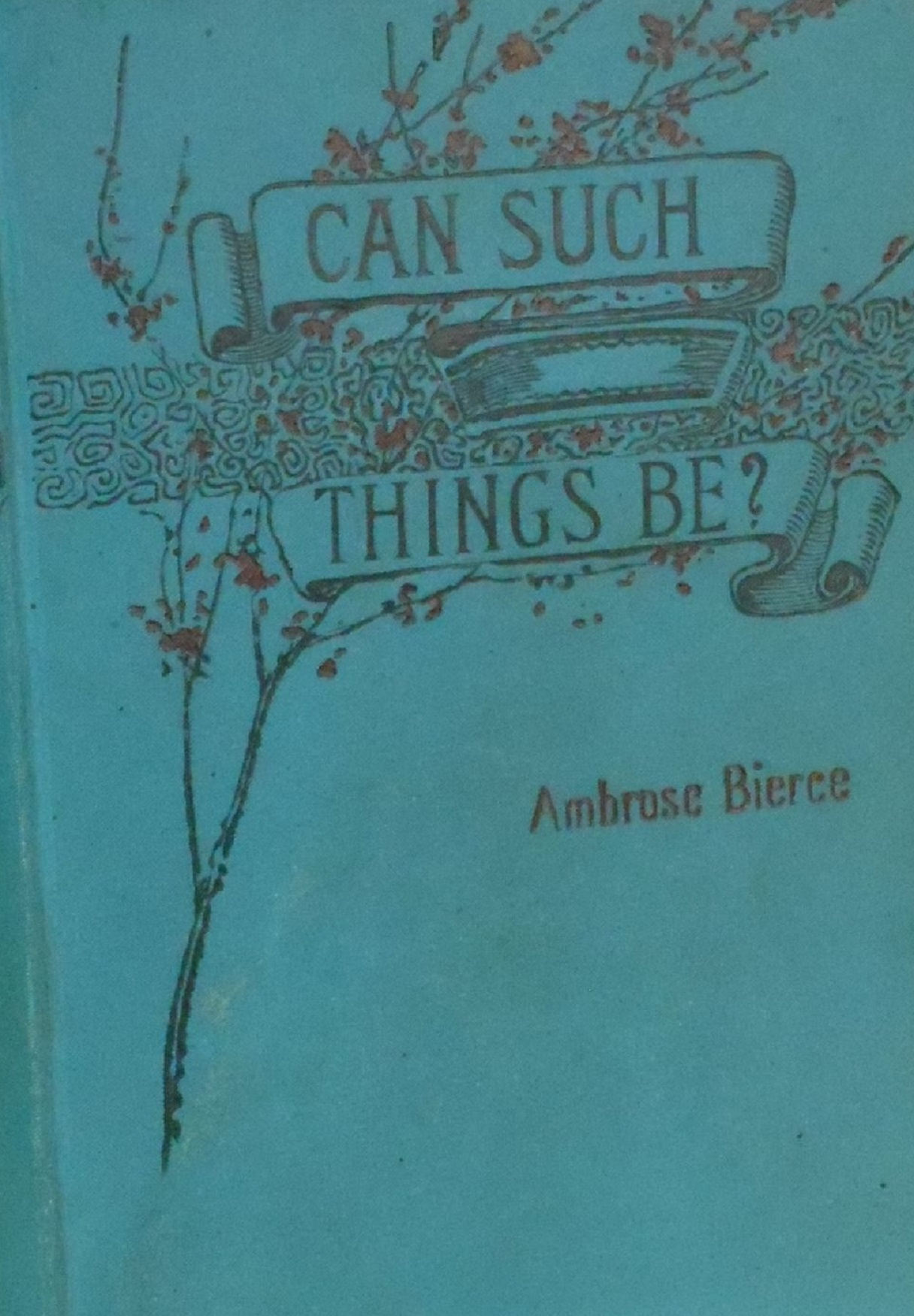
Published in the 1893 anthology Can Such Things Be?

"The Realm of the Unreal" is a short story by American Civil War soldier, wit, and writer Ambrose Bierce. It appeared in The San Francisco Examiner on July 20, 1890 and was reprinted in the 1893 collection Can Such Things Be?.

The story elaborates the idea of "the realm of the unreal" introduced by Bierce in the 1879 story My Shipwreck.

== Plot summary ==
While riding to Auburn, the narrator encounters Dr. Dorrimore and reluctantly gives him a ride to a hotel. He can't stand Dorrimore, who is a magician of sorts from Calcutta and who stupefied the narrator with his performance five years earlier. The narrator gives the Indian a ride but hopes his interaction with the man will be minimal. He discovers that Dorrimore is staying at the same hotel as him.

Shortly thereafter, the narrator's paramour unexpectedly arrives and he spends a few weeks thoroughly enjoying her company. He also reluctantly introduces her to Dorrimore. One night, a few weeks later, the narrator is sitting near a graveyard at night when he sees Dorrimore with his love. In a feat of jealousy, he springs forward, "bent upon murder", and awakens the next morning in his room with bruises on his body and throat.

When the narrator asks about his love, he finds out that she has never visited Auburn and that Dr. Dorrimore has left that morning. Later he reads about Dorrimore hypnotizing an entire audience in Baltimore by simply telling them what to see and hear. The magician also claims

that a peculiarly susceptible subject may be kept in the realm of the unreal for weeks, months, and even years, dominated by whatever delusions and hallucinations the operator may from time to time suggest.

== Sources ==
- Grenander, M.E. Ambrose Bierce. NY: Twayne Publishers, 1971.
- McWilliams, Carey (1929; reprinted 1967). Ambrose Bierce: A Biography, Archon Books.
- Morris, Roy (1999) [1995]. Ambrose Bierce: alone in bad company. US: Oxford University Press. ISBN 978-0-19-512628-0.
- Nickell, Joseph 'Joe' (1992). Ambrose Bierce Is Missing and Other Historical Mysteries. ISBN 9780813117669.
- O'Conner, Richard (1967). Ambrose Bierce: a Biography, with illustrations, Boston, Little, Brown and Company.
