= Tales of Soldiers and Civilians =

1892 collection of short stories by Ambrose Bierce

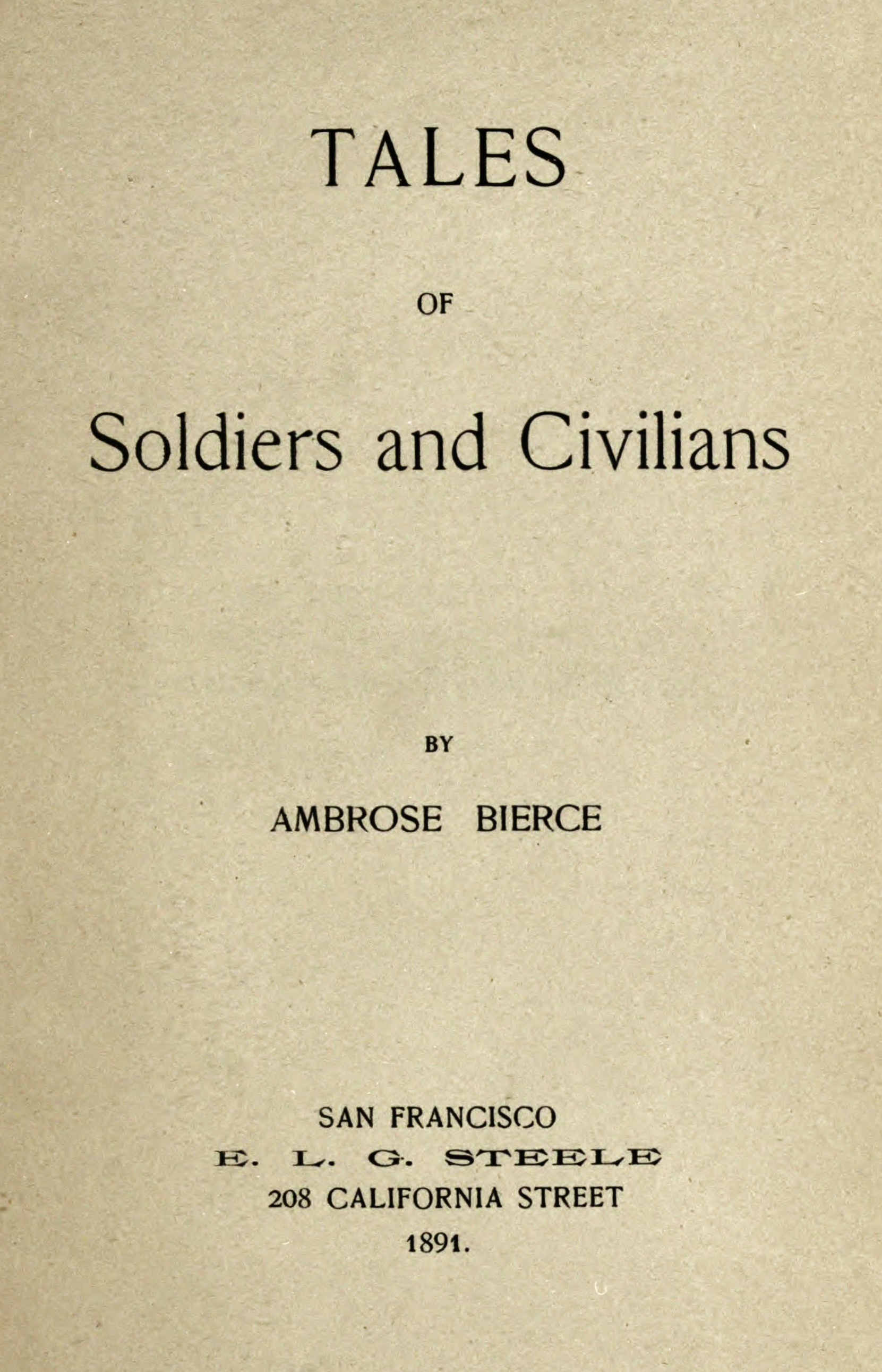
- First edition title page
- Author: Ambrose Bierce
- Language: English
- Publisher: E.L.G. Steele
- Publication date: Stated publication date 1891; actual publication date probably early 1892
- Publication place: United States
- English publication date: 1892

Tales of Soldiers and Civilians is a collection of short stories by American Civil War soldier, wit, and writer Ambrose Bierce, also published under the title In the Midst of Life. With a stated publication date of 1891 (but actually published in early 1892) the stories describe unusual incidents in the lives of soldiers and civilians during the American Civil War. Tales of Soldiers and Civilians was named by the Grolier Club as one of the 100 most influential American books printed before 1900, stating "These short stories are among the finest, and best known, in American literature. ... Written in a clear simple style, with each phrase contributing to the total effect, Bierce's tales pointed the way for the American short-story writer." Bierce's famous story "An Occurrence at Owl Creek Bridge" is included in this collection.

== Publication ==
In the preface to the first edition, Bierce maintained that the book had been "denied existence by the chief publishing houses of the country." He credited the eventual publication of the book to his friend, Mr. E. L. G. Steele, a merchant from San Francisco, who was listed with the 1891 copyright.

In 1898, Tales was republished along with other stories by G.P. Putnam's Sons under the title In the Midst of Life. George Sterling, in the introduction to a later (1927) edition, noted that as a result of "obtuse critics and a benighted public", the book failed to become the sensation Bierce had expected.

The original publication contained nineteen stories, while those in later publications increased in number; 1898 to 22, and 1909 to 26. The original nineteen stories were retained in the 1898 publication, but were not entirely collectively retained in the 1909 edition. Four of these were transferred by Bierce into his collection Collected Works, Can Such Things Be? In a similar fashion, Bierce moved eight stories into the 1909 version of In the Midst of Life from the 1893 edition of Can Such Things Be? Sixteen of the original stories were initially published in the San Francisco Examiner.

== Comparisons and inspiration ==
Near publication, the New York Tribune wrote that "These tales are so original as to defy comparison... weird and curious... There's nothing like it in fiction." However, because Bierce's Tales of Soldiers and Civilians occur during the Civil War, it is often compared with Stephen Crane's The Red Badge of Courage. Contemporary reviews suggested that Bierce's writing had comparatively more value, evidenced by such reviews as by the Rochester Post-Express, which stated: "Bierce's pictures of the Civil War are vastly more valuable than Crane's 'Red Badge of Courage'", and by the Cincinnati Commercial Tribune: "Bierce's work shows far more imagination and a better grasp of thought and events than Crane's."

Bierce served as a union soldier during the Civil War and his experiences as a soldier served as an inspiration for his writing, particularly for the Soldiers section. In this way, Bierce's war treatments anticipate and parallel Ernest Hemingway's later arrival, whereas the civilian tales later influence horror writers.

== Structure ==
The Federal cannoneers fought their hopeless battle in an atmosphere of living iron whose thoughts were lightnings and whose deeds were death.

— Tales of Soldiers and Civilians: The Affair at Coulter's Notch.

Since the book is a compilation of short stories, there is not an overarching plot. However, there are literary elements, or plot devices, that are shared throughout. Bierce's stories often begin mid-plot, with relevant details withheld until the end, where the dramatic resolution unfolds unexpectedly, to a degree where most are considered twist endings. His characters were described by George Sterling as: "His heroes, or rather victims, are lonely men, passing to unpredictable dooms, and hearing, from inaccessible crypts of space, the voices of unseen malevolencies."

The book is divided into two segments—Soldiers and Civilians. Within these short stories, Bierce's uses Roman numerals to demarcate segments. For example, "A Horseman in the Sky" is eleven pages long, yet has four parts.

| Soldiers | Civilians |
|---|---|
| "A Horseman in the Sky" "An Occurrence at Owl Creek Bridge" "Chickamauga" "A Son of the Gods" "One of the Missing" "Killed at Resaca" "The Affair at Coulter's Notch" "A Tough Tussle" "The Coup de Grâce" "Parker Adderson, Philosopher" | "A Watcher by the Dead" "The Man and the Snake" "A Holy Terror" "The Suitable Surroundings" "An Inhabitant of Carcosa" "The Boarded Window" "The Middle Toe of the Right Foot" "Häita, the Shepherd" "An Heiress from Redhorse" |

In 1892 and 1898, Bierce gradually expanded Tales by adding new stories (e.g., "The Eyes of the Panther"). In his Collected Works, several stories with supernatural elements (e.g., "A Tough Tussle") were relocated from Tales to another book, Can Such Things Be?

== Literary significance ==
Many critics have noted the collection's heavy irony, particularly in its depictions of heroism and war. Those soldiers who aspire to "manly" virtues on the battlefield often only add to the horrors of the war around them, such as Lieutenant Brayle of "Killed at Resaca", whose brave sacrifice inspires a hundred men to charge needlessly into certain death, or "The Affair at Coulter's Notch", in which an officer's sense of duty causes him to knowingly shell his own home, killing his family. Bierce's stories can thus be read as evoking a "crisis of masculine identity" in which exaggeratedly "masculine" behavior paradoxically stems from a "feminine" insecurity and desire to impress one's fellows.

The war stories are also notable for their frank portrayal of wounds not only to soldiers, but also to women (in "Chickamauga") and children (in "The Affair at Coulter's Notch"), an approach which was very rare in Bierce's day. This gruesome physical cost of war is then juxtaposed, often explicitly, with the idealized portrait of war presented by some of the collection's officers and politicians.

The book and its individual stories have influenced several writers. For example, Mexican novelist Carlos Fuentes, author of the novel The Old Gringo, who said: "What started this novel was my admiration for Ambrose Bierce and for his Tales of Soldiers and Civilians."

== Noteworthy editions ==
- Tales of Soldiers and Civilians. San Francisco: E.L.G. Steele, 1891 (stated year; probably actually 1892). First edition.
- In the Midst of Life: Tales of Soldiers and Civilians. London: Chatto & Windus, 1892, 1893, 1898, 1910, 1930, 1950, 1964. First British edition. First edition to use the title In the Midst of Life.
- Tales of Soldiers and Civilians. New York: United States Book Co., [1892]. Second American edition. First paperback edition. Printed from same plates as first edition.
- In the Midst of Life: Tales of Soldiers and Civilians. Leipzig: Tauchnitz, 1892. First edition printed in Germany (in English). Based on Chatto & Windus British edition.
- Tales of Soldiers and Civilians. New York: Lovell, Coryell & Co., 1895. Fifty-cent paperback. Printed from same plates as first edition.
- In the Midst of Life: Tales of Soldiers and Civilians. New York & London: G.P. Putnam's Sons, 1898, 1901. First enlarged edition. New preface. First American edition to use this title.
- In the Midst of Life: Tales of Soldiers and Civilians New York and Washington, DC: Neale Publishing, 1909 [The Collected Works of Ambrose Bierce: Volume II]. Expanded to 26 stories. Restored original preface.
- In the Midst of Life: Tales of Soldiers and Civilians. New York: Modern Library, 1927. Introduction by George Sterling.
- The Eyes of the Panther: Tales of Soldiers and Civilians. London: J. Cape, 1928. Introduction by Martin Armstrong.
- Tales of Soldiers and Civilians. New York: Limited Editions Club, 1943. Limited edition bound in linen and sheepskin. Introduction by Joseph Henry Jackson. Illustrations by Paul Landacre.
- "In the Midst of Life: Tales of Soldiers and Civilians" (in The Collected Writings of Ambrose Bierce, New York: Citadel Press, 1946). Introduction by Clifton Fadiman. First inclusion in an anthology.
- In the Midst of Life and Other Stories. New York: Signet Classics, 1961. Afterword by Marcus Cunliffe.
- Tales of Soldiers and Civilians. Norwalk, CT: Heritage Press, 1971. Slipcased clothbound reprint of 1943 Limited Editions Club edition.
- Tales of Soldiers and Civilians. Norwalk, CT: Easton Press, 1971. Leatherbound reprint of 1943 Limited Editions Club edition. "Publisher's Preface" by anonymous. Series: Masterpieces of American Literature. Decorative pattern on spine.
- In the Midst of Life. Franklin Center, PA: Franklin Library, 1979. Leatherbound limited edition. Illustrated by Dennis Lyall. Series: Collected Stories of the World's Greatest Writers.
- Tales of Soldiers and Civilians and Other Stories. New York and London: Penguin Classics, 2000. Introduction by Tom Quirk.
- Tales of Soldiers and Civilians. Kent, OH: Kent State University Press, 2003. Introduction, textual restoration, appendix, and annotations by Donald T. Blume. Editor Blume shows that Bierce preferred the original sequence of 19 stories for his book and uses Bierce's handwritten notes on his original pasteup to eliminate errors introduced in the printing of the first edition, making this the first corrected edition. 89-page appendix presents Bierce's writings elsewhere relevant to each individual story.
- Tales of Soldiers and Civilians. Norwalk, CT: Easton Press, 2006. Leatherbound reprint of 1943 Limited Editions Club edition. Illustrations on spine of two figures, a soldier and a civilian.
- "In the Midst of Life (Tales of Soldiers and Civilians)" (in Ambrose Bierce: The Devil's Dictionary, Tales, and Memoirs, Boone, IA: Library of America, 2011). S. T. Joshi, ed.
- In the Midst of Life: Tales of Soldiers and Civilians. Ashland, OR: Blackstone Audio, 2015. Audiobook narrated by Stefan Rudnicki, Gabrielle De Cuir, and J. Paul Boehmer.
