= One of the Missing (film) =

1968 British film by Tony Scott

- Directed by: Tony Scott
- Written by: Ambrose Bierce (short story); Tony Scott
- Starring: Stephen Edwards
- Cinematography: Tony Scott
- Edited by: Tony Scott
- Release date: 1968
- Running time: 25 minutes
- Country: United Kingdom
- Language: English
- Budget: £2,000

One of the Missing is a 1968 short film written and directed by Tony Scott. The film is set during the American Civil War and is based on Ambrose Bierce's short story of the same name.
