= Beyond the Wall (short story) =

1907 ghost story by Ambrose Bierce

- Short story by Ambrose Bierce

Text available at Wikisource
- Country: United States
- Language: English
- Genre: Ghost story

Publication
- Published in: Cosmopolitan
- Media type: Print
- Publication date: December 1907

"Beyond the Wall" is a ghost story by American Civil War soldier, wit, and writer Ambrose Bierce. It was published by Cosmopolitan in December 1907.

== Plot summary ==
The narrator visits his strange friend in San Francisco. They have dinner up in the tower within the house. As they are eating, there is a knocking on the wall that disturbs the narrator. The friend tells him to explore it. They discover there is only the outside behind the wall from which he had heard the sound. The friend explains that he has heard this knocking before and that he was happy the narrator also witnessed it.

The friend then goes into a tale about his earlier days. He was exiting his apartment when he met a young beautiful woman. He fell in love with this woman and found pretexts to visit her. He also discovered that they shared an adjacent wall. However, he never entirely moved forward with pursuing the young woman because they were not of equal class.

The man began to knock on the wall and she reciprocated. This continued for a time until she stopped knocking. The man grew disappointed and even resentful. When he did hear a knocking some time later, he chose to ignore it. The next morning, he discovered that the woman had been bedridden with illness and in her last night on earth demanded to have her bed moved to the other side so she could knock on the wall.

The man finishes the story and the narrator wishes him good night. He adds that his friend died that very night: "Alone with his sorrow and remorse, he passed into the Unknown".

== Criticism ==
S. T. Joshi lists "Beyond the Wall" among a handful of Bierce's "simple tales of revenge in which the supernatural is a scarcely veiled metaphor for the conscience of the guilty".

Some critics dismiss "Beyond the Wall" as a "lackluster and unimaginative" retread of Bierce's "spectacular" early story "The Middle Toe of the Right Foot" (1891).

"Beyond the Wall" is notable for describing San Francisco as "a desolate, foggy, and mysterious" place, an image that would be popularized by noir fiction in the mid-20th century.
