= The Secret of Macarger's Gulch =

- Short story by Ambrose Bierce

Text available at Wikisource
- Country: United States
- Language: English
- Genre: Gothic fiction

Publication
- Published in: The Wave
- Publication date: April 25, 1891

"The Secret of Macarger's Gulch" is a Gothic ghost story by American Civil War soldier, wit, and writer Ambrose Bierce. It was first published in the San Francisco periodical The Wave on April 25, 1891, before appearing in the 1893 collection Can Such Things Be?.

== Plot summary ==
A hunter wandering through Macarger's Gulch, a gulch that is barely known even to the locals, finds an abandoned and disheveled cabin where he takes up residence for the night. When he falls asleep, he dreams of a city and a couple, and though he has never been there or met these people, he knows them to be Edinburgh and the MacGregors.

The protagonist awakes from this dream still in the cabin but with an overwhelming fear that there is something lurking in the cabin with him. He restarts his fire and continues to feel uncomfortable with the place.

Years later, he encounters someone who is familiar with the gulch. He is told that not so long ago, after the cabin fell apart, they found a dead woman there who was killed by a pick-axe and the husband was never heard from. The friend also explains that Macarger was a misspelling of MacGregor.
