= One of Twins =

1888 short story by Ambrose Bierce

"One of Twins" is a short story by American Civil War soldier, wit, and writer Ambrose Bierce exploring a telepathic connection between the twins. It was first published in The San Francisco Examiner on October 28, 1888, and was included in Bierce's 1893 collection of supernatural tales Can Such Things Be?

== Summary ==
Henry Stevens, one of a set of twins, explains to someone how he has never really experienced much in terms of strange phenomena as a twin except for this one series of events which he will relate. First, he explains that he and his twin brother John were so identical that it is likely they were switched back and forth many times in their infancy. Upon growing up, they moved to San Jose where they ended up living in different parts of the city.

One day, the narrator encounters a man who begins talking with him and assumes him to be his twin. The man invites him over for a meal and he agrees thanking the man by using the man's last name, even though he had never met the man. When he meets up with his twin, his twin randomly asks the man for the address the next day, having somehow known about the meeting.

The host, Mr. Margovan, has a daughter, Julia, to whom John Stevens becomes engaged. Meanwhile, the narrator explains he found an inexplicable desire to follow a woman whom he never met. He followed her until she met up with another man and entered a disreputable place. Later on, he met his brother for dinner with his fiancée. Here, he discovers that his twin's soon-to-be wife is in fact the woman he saw earlier. He confronts her when others are not near. He demands that she call off the wedding. Others come back into the room and the conversation ends there.

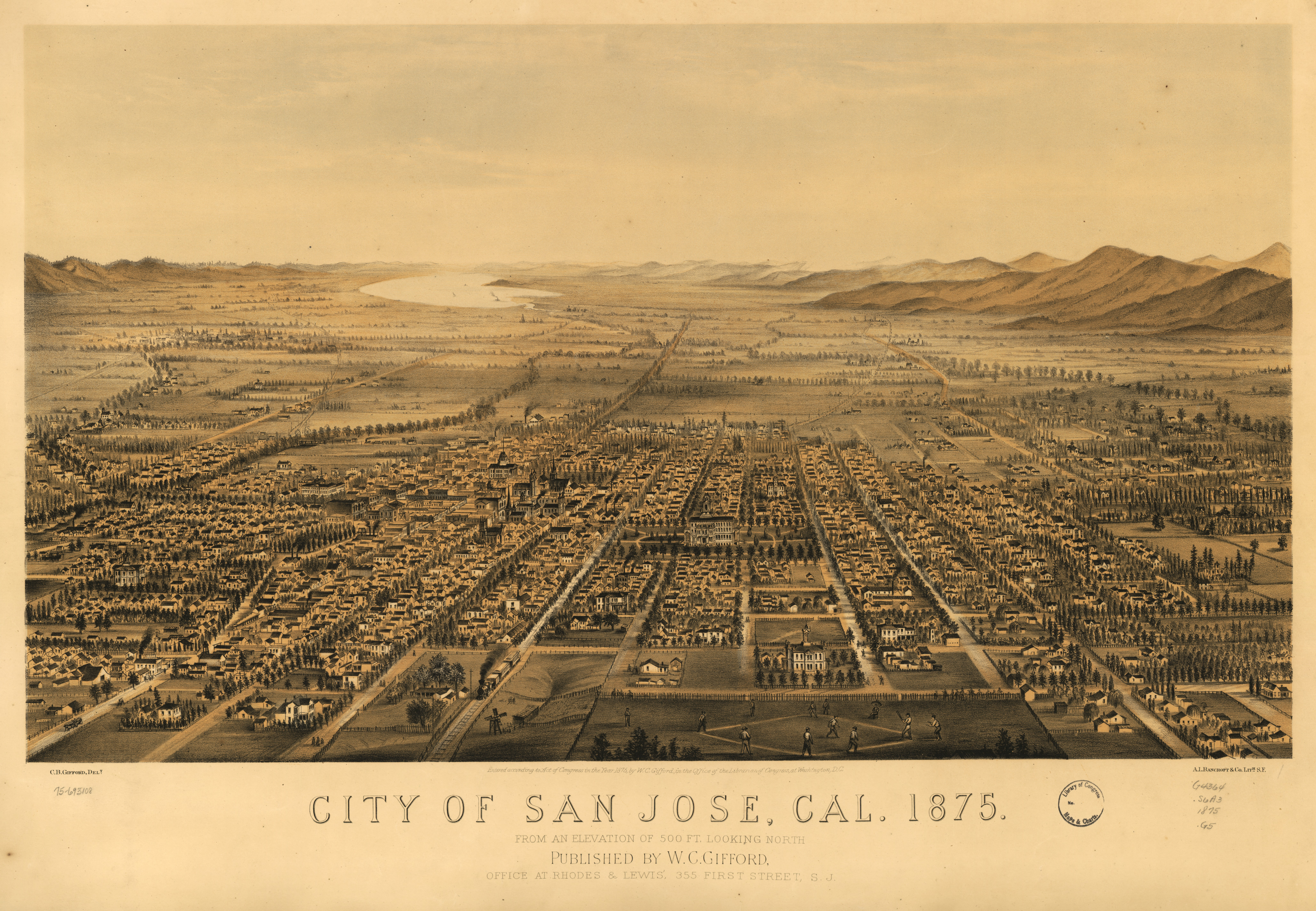
The city of San Jose in 1875

The next night while sleeping, the narrator is startled by some dark feeling that he cannot fully identify. A short time later, he hears a scream that he knows to be his brother's. He races to the Margovan house wherein he finds that the fiancée had killed herself with poison hours earlier and that his brother had shot himself.

Years later, while wandering the street, Henry encountered a man. As he approached a lantern, the narrator recognized him as Julia's lover whom he had seen at the "disreputable place" years before. "He was terribly altered — gray, worn and haggard; dissipation and vice were in evidence in every look". The man exclaimed at the narrator, apparently taking him for the apparition of his twin brother, and attempted to punch him, but then died on the spot.

== Analysis ==
Like Edgar Poe before him, Bierce consciously blurs the edges of identity between the narrator and his twin doppelgänger. Even their parents view John and Henry as two sides of the same personality, "Jehnry". From a psychoanalytic perspective, John's death is supposed to be beneficial for Henry: it allows John's passion, the id, to join with Henry's sense of moral responsibility, or super ego, into a now collective consciousness, or ego.

It is not clear from the story whether Julia committed suicide or was murdered by her fiancé. Bierce implies that "Henry's knowledge about her infidelity has been shared psychically with his twin, prompting John to a tragic confrontation".
