= A Tough Tussle =

1888 short story by Ambrose Bierce

"A Tough Tussle" is a short story by American Civil War soldier, wit, and writer Ambrose Bierce. It was published on the first page of the Sunday supplement to The San Francisco Examiner on September 30, 1888 and was reprinted in Tales of Soldiers and Civilians (1891).

== Plot summary ==
The story is set in the American Civil War. Second-Lieutenant Brainerd Byring sits on patrol at night with the Confederates near. He leads a squadron of men positioned in a holding position as the first line. During his four-hour vigil Byring takes a moment to rest by removing his sword and gun. He slips into deep contemplation about the world around him and contrasts the dark night of nature to his own world of war.

Byring realizes shortly that he is in the presence of what he assumes to be a dead body. Though Byring has proven himself in war, he is utterly disgusted by the presence of a corpse. He realizes that he has to sit with the dead body and this leads him to contemplate where the repulsion towards the dead comes from.

As the moonlight and clouds shift, Byring realizes the body belongs to a Confederate soldier. The twisted repose of the body further discomforts him and he stands to move but then changes his mind for fear of being perceived as weak. He doesn't leave but without conscious thought, finds himself standing in an offensive position ready to strike, which makes him laugh.

Byring then begins to see (or believes he sees) the corpse moving, but before anything more can happen, a gunshot rings out which brings him out of his mind. The fighting starts and continues into the early morning.

The next day, a Federal captain is exploring the damage and comes across two bodies, Byring and a dead Confederate soldier. It is clear that Byring inflicted wounds upon the enemy but died of a sword wound to the heart. However, the sword was Byring's own and the Confederate soldier's body had long been dead.

== Analysis ==
The "tough tussle" of the title is, ironically, the one with a dead body, or rather, the young officer's struggle with himself, with his irrational fear of death and dead bodies. The story presents this "mad struggle with a corpse" as a symptom of war trauma. As in so many of his stories, Bierce highlights "a power of the mind to shape perception,” anticipating the discovery of shell shock among World War I veterans).

As Byring's generalized anxiety gradually becomes fixated on the corpse, the young officer envisions the dead body as animate and attacks it. According to Sharon Talley, "Bierce anticipates current psychological thinking in his appreciation of the incapacitating consequences of war trauma on the human psyche... that can lead individuals to choose suicide as a solution when anxiety becomes overwhelming".
