= The Spook House =

- Short story by Ambrose Bierce

Text available at Wikisource
- Country: United States
- Language: English
- Genre: Short story

Publication
- Published in: The San Francisco Examiner
- Publication date: July 7, 1889

"The Spook House" is a Gothic short story of a haunted house by American Civil War soldier, wit, and writer Ambrose Bierce. It was first published in The San Francisco Examiner on July 7, 1889.

According to H. P. Lovecraft, the story is "told with a severely homely air of journalistic verisimilitude", yet "conveys terrible hints of shocking mystery".

== Plot ==
In 1858, an entire family of seven persons disappears suddenly and unaccountably from a plantation house in eastern Kentucky, leaving all its possessions untouched — furniture, clothing, food supplies, horses, cattle, and slaves.

About a year later, two men of high standing are forced by a storm to take shelter in the deserted dwelling, and in doing so, they stumble into a supernatural room lit by an unaccountable greenish light and having an iron door which cannot be opened from within. In this room lie the decayed corpses of all the missing family; as one of the discoverers rushes forward to embrace a body he seems to recognise, the other is so overpowered by a putrid odor that he accidentally shuts his companion in the vault and loses consciousness.

Recovering his senses six weeks later, the survivor is unable to find the hidden room; and the house is burned during the Civil War. The imprisoned discoverer is never seen or heard of again.
