= The Death of Halpin Frayser =

Short story by Ambrose Bierce

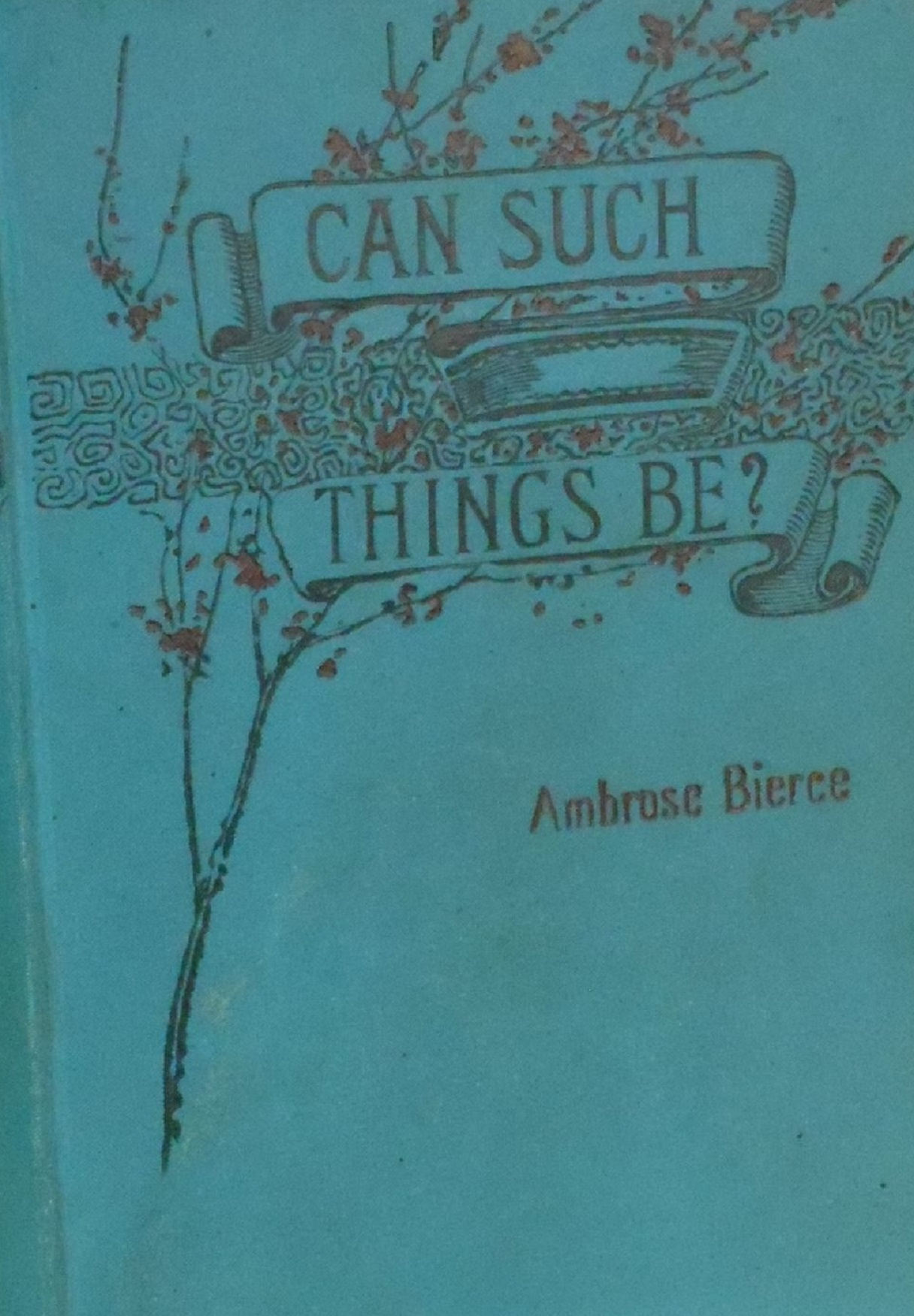
Published in the 1893 anthology Can Such Things Be?

"The Death of Halpin Frayser" is a Gothic ghost story by Ambrose Bierce. It was first published in the San Francisco periodical The Wave on December 19, 1891, before appearing in the 1893 collection Can Such Things Be?

== Plot summary ==
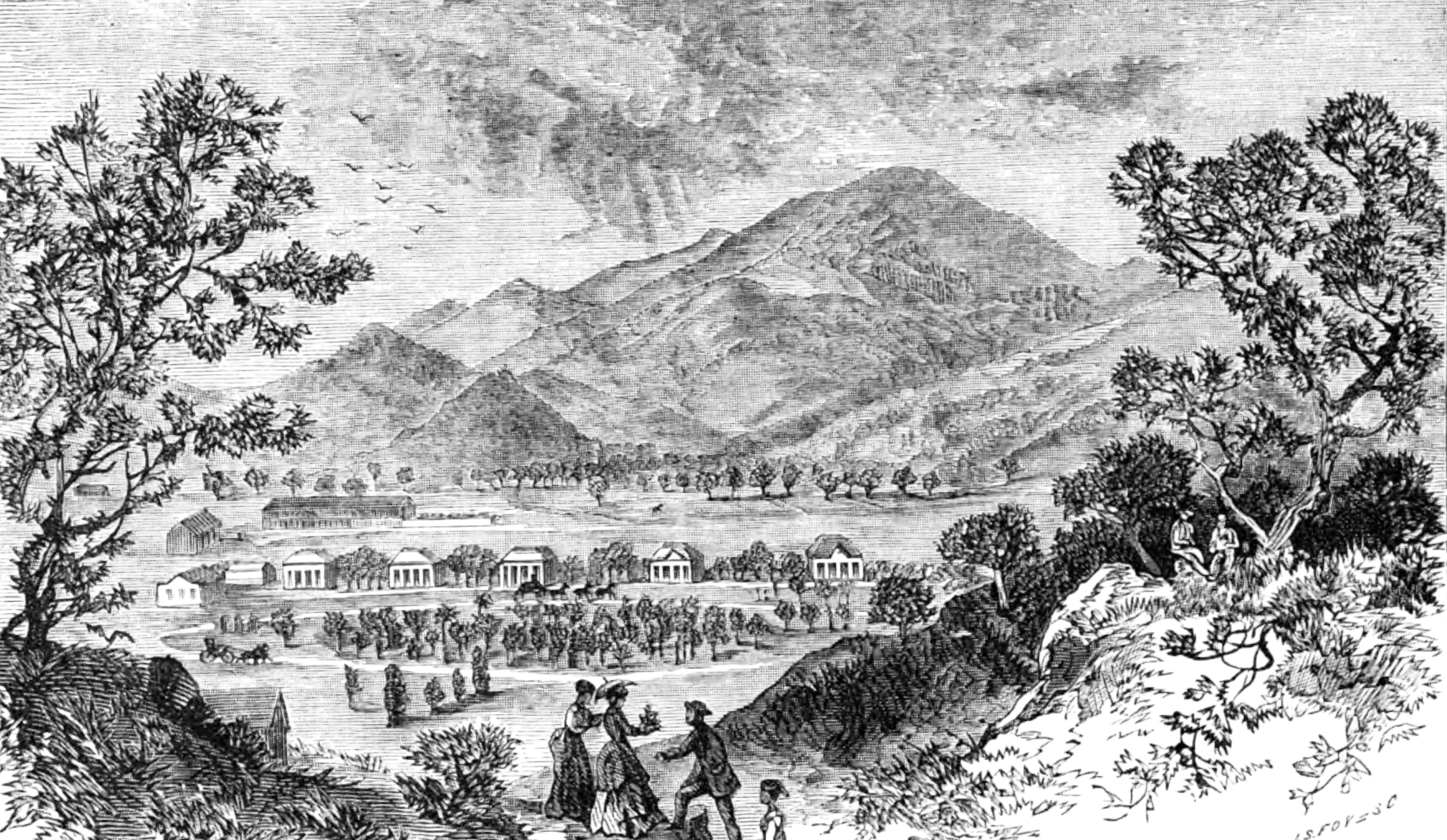
Mount Saint Helena in 1873

Halpin Frayser, a 32-year-old resident of the Napa Valley, awakens from a dreamless sleep speaking the mysterious words "Catherine LaRue" into the darkness. Earlier that day, Frayser went hunting in the vicinity of Mount Saint Helena. As he wanders the darkness and chooses a "road less travelled", it is clear there is something devious about. Halpin dreams about a haunted forest dripping with blood and is stricken with fear. In his dream, Halpin grabs a red-leather pocketbook and begins to write with blood a dark poem (in the manner of Freneau's "The House of Night") but before he can write too much, he is confronted by the corpse of his mother.

The story then switches to Frayser's upbringing in Nashville, Tennessee. He never fit in with most of his family except for his mother. His penchant for poetry (albeit bad poetry) makes him a favorite to her. As Frayser becomes a young man, the relationship between mother and son is perceived as strange as they are together constantly. One day, Frayser tells her that he will go to California and though she initially tries to go with him, she relents. She has a dream that her son will die there by strangulation. While in San Francisco, Halpin is kidnapped onto a ship and spends several years at sea.

The story switches back to the day after Halpin's confrontation with his mother's corpse. A deputy and detective are walking the roads near where Halpin was last seen, looking for a criminal named Branscom. They heard he is in town and plan to capture him. He's wanted for slicing the throat of a woman in California. While exploring an area beyond a graveyard, they find a body that clearly was in a struggle before dying. They discover that this is Halpin's body and a poem on him that he had just written. Nearby, they discover another headboard with the name Catherine LaRue.

It's at this point that the officer remembers that Larue was Branscom's original last name and Frayser was the name of the woman whom Branscom killed. The detectives hear an "unnatural" and "unhuman" laugh that fills them with dread.

== Interpretations ==
The most obvious interpretation of the story is supernatural: Halpin was killed by the zombie or lich-like corpse of his mother. Years ago, she went to search for him in California and ended up by marrying Larue, her future murderer. After Halpin unknowingly approached her grave, the revenant "strangled her son literally, as she had strangled him metaphorically during her life". As summarised by H. P. Lovecraft, the story "tells of a body skulking by night without a soul in a weird and horribly ensanguined wood, and of a man beset by ancestral memories who met death at the claws of that which had been his fervently loved mother".

There is also a naturalistic interpretation: Halpin is killed by the maniac Branscom while dreaming that he is being strangled by his mother. His dream is probably inspired by Catherine's premonitory dream of her son's strangulation in California. That all this happens by his mother's grave is just an improbable coincidence. This leaves unexplained the hideous unearthly laugh heard by the detectives, however.

More recent commentators, including William Bysshe Stein and Robert C. Maclean, have highlighted the incestuous attachment between Halpin and his mother. Maclean has speculated that after Halpin and his mother fled separately west, they lived as man and wife in California (although there is no indication of this in Bierce's text). S. T. Joshi went even further by claiming that it was Frayser who "killed his wife/mother but she came back from the dead as he lurked by her grave". According to Maclean, Halpin's murderer was no other than "his own father, disguised as the private detective Jaralson".

== Assessment ==
The story has been viewed as "perhaps Bierce's most remarkable supernatural tale" and a key precursor of zombie fiction. In 1927, H. P. Lovecraft included "The Death of Halpin Frayser" among "permanent mountain-peaks of American weird writing". For Frederic Taber Cooper, it was "the most fiendishly ghastly tale in the literature of the Anglo-Saxon race".

"The Death of Halpin Frayser" has also been acclaimed as "an interesting pre-Freudian study of an Oedipal theme". It has been noted that "Branscom/LaRue fulfills Frayser's deadly incestuous drive by killing the latter's mother". "Halpin Frayser" supposedly goes beyond Bierce's other non-war stories in "reaching a truly rich measure of psychological complexity".

The story's style is elaborate and its structure is complex. The murky dream sequence is wedged between two realistic narratives set in the daylight. As Samuel Loveman has noted, "flowers, verdure, and the boughs and leaves of trees are magnificently placed as an opposing foil to unnatural malignity".

== See also ==
- Ulalume, a poem that inspired the first part of Bierce's story
