= Killed at Resaca =

1887 short story by Ambrose Bierce

"Killed at Resaca" is a short story by American Civil War soldier, wit, and writer Ambrose Bierce. First published in The San Francisco Examiner on June 5, 1887, it was later included in Bierce's Tales of Soldiers and Civilians in 1891.

== Plot ==
"Killed at Resaca" begins with the narrator describing a lieutenant, Herman Brayle, he serves with during the American Civil War. Brayle, a tall man with fair features, consistently wears full uniform and never takes cover during battle. Despite being questioned for his reasoning to behave so foolishly in battles and with little regards for his safety, he never explains or changes his actions. One day when given an order to deliver a message, rather than taking a safe path to do so, Brayle charges out into an open field and is fired upon by Confederate troops. Watching his heroic figure galloping through the gunshots, the Union soldiers also put forth their own efforts to defend and battle. Even when presented with an opportunity for salvation in the form of a hiding place, Brayle awaits death with a defiant stance.

After he falls, the battle is ended and Confederate soldiers assist in his removal from the field and even play a dirge. Included among the possessions of the slain hero is a letter from a woman, who writes that she had heard he hid behind a tree once during a battle, and would rather he were dead than learn that he was the sort of coward who would take cover. Bitter at the loss the letter has caused, the narrator vows to pay a visit to the woman and reveal the destruction of her words. She throws the letter into the fire because it's stained and she "can't stand the sight of blood", howevermuch she enjoyed the thought of it being shed. When she asks how Brayle died, he does not relate the story of his heroic actions. Instead, he simply replies, "He was bitten by a snake."
