= A Horseman in the Sky =

1889 short story by Ambrose Bierce

- Author: Ambrose Bierce
- Language: English
- Published: April 14, 1889
- Publisher: The Examiner
- Publication place: United States

"A Horseman in the Sky" is a heavily anthologized short story by American Civil War soldier, wit, and writer Ambrose Bierce. It was published on April 14, 1889 under the title The Horseman in the Sky in the Sunday edition of The Examiner, a San Francisco newspaper owned by William Randolph Hearst. It is set during the American Civil War and is one of Bierce's best known war stories. Bierce revised the story for his book Tales of Soldiers and Civilians.

== Plot summary ==
A soldier lies on the ground on the lookout for the terrain and any potential enemy soldiers that might arrive. He falls asleep but luckily is not discovered by his sergeant as it would mean his death. When he awakes, he sees a mounted Confederate soldier on a ledge. He contemplates to shoot the man but finds himself morally challenged. In the end, he shoots the horse. Both the man and his horse fall off the ledge.

An officer who happens to be in the forest under the ledge looks up and sees a man on a horse, seemingly running through the sky. It shocks him and he all but passes out. When he recovers he goes searching for the man but does not find man or horse. When he returns to camp, he says nothing. Meanwhile, a superior comes up to the soldier to ask what he's seen and the soldier tells him that he shot at a horse in order to kill the man. When asked to identify the man, he explains the man was his father and a Confederate soldier.

== Analysis ==
"A Horseman in the Sky" highlights the destructive impact of the war on a single family. The central character is a young Virginian, named Carter Druse, who decides to fight for the Union, betraying his state. He finds himself unavoidably having to kill a Confederate horseman spy, who is his father. The story cycles around the considerations and feelings of this young man. In the first version of the story, Druse, presented with an impossible choice between patriotic duty and filial obedience, loses his mind.

It has been argued that Bierce's rewriting of the tale, and Carter Druse's reaction to his father's death, reflects the author's attempt to come to terms with his own wartime trauma, specifically his head wound that has been diagnosed as a Traumatic Brain Injury (TBI).

The setting with a cliff is essential for the story to work. Having been a topographical officer in the Civil War, Bierce describes the setting in much detail, showing his talent for topographical rendering. The image of a falling Confederate officer is supposed to present (for Federals a thousand feet below) "a grandly grotesque image that seems to herald the Apocalypse".

Bierce apparently considered "A Horseman in the Sky" one of his strongest stories, because he chose to begin his Tales of Soldiers and Civilians with this story. From a Freudian perspective, "A Horseman in the Sky" exemplifies "Bierce's compulsive acts of patricide". Some of Bierce's biographers argue that he "wrote too many stories about sons killing fathers", as evidenced by stories in his so-called "Patricide Club".

== Influence ==
Carlos Fuentes's novel The Old Gringo (1985), a fictionalized account of Bierce's disappearance, contains numerous allusions to "A Horseman in the Sky".
