= The Eyes of the Panther =

Short story by Ambrose Bierce

"The Eyes of the Panther" is a short story by American Civil War soldier, wit, and writer Ambrose Bierce featuring a female werepanther. It was published in The San Francisco Examiner on 17 October 1897 before appearing in his 1898 collection In the Midst of Life.

== Plot summary ==
Jenner Brading, a young rural attorney, finds himself dumbfounded when Irene Marlowe refuses his marriage proposal. She has clear affection for him but insists that she is insane; she later describes it as akin to possession. Irene explains.

Long ago when Irene was in her mother's womb, her parents lived in cabin in a more rustic area with their firstborn, a daughter. Her father, Charles Marlowe, was a typical woodsman and regularly went out into the wild to hunt for food.

One day as Marlowe prepares to leave, his wife portends something horrible will happen and beseeches him to stay. Marlowe assures her that he will be all right. Late that night a panther appears at the window and scares the mother. She clutches her infant tightly to her chest as she waits frozen in terror. When Marlowe returns, he finds his wife emotionally traumatised and the baby accidentally smothered to death in her embrace. Irene was born several months after this but her mother died in childbirth.

Jenner asks Irene how this could mean that she is insane. She replies that a person born under such circumstances must be insane. As she leaves, Jenner believes he sees a panther. He runs after Irene, but as she arrives at her house Jenner can see no panther.

Several nights later, he finds a panther has crept into his room. He shoots it and it flees. When he and others pursue it by following the blood trail, they find not the dead beast but Irene's body.

== Analysis ==
"The Eyes of the Panther" is an early example of werewolf fiction featuring an innocent (rather than criminal) werewolf. Irene's condition is blamed on a kind of prenatal curse. The idea may be traced to Cardillac's prenatal curse in Mademoiselle de Scuderi, by E. T. A. Hoffmann (1819).

Bierce anticipates the surprise ending by highlighting Irene's "feline beauty" which made her so desirable to the attorney. She is described as "lithe", her eyes as "gray-green, long and narrow". She even wears "a gray gown with odd brown markings", reminiscent of a panther's skin.

S. T. Joshi suggests that Irene was killed by the protagonist out of revenge: "when Jenner sees the shining eyes at his window, he may be playing out some subconscious desire to kill" the woman who spurned his proposal. In other words, Jenner is insane and the werewolf motif is just a red herring.

== Film adaptations ==
"The Eyes of the Panther" was adapted for the screen twice. One version was developed for Shelley Duvall's Nightmare Classics series and was released in 1989. It runs about 60 minutes. A shorter version was released in 2006 by director Michael Barton and runs about 23 minutes.

In 1930, Val Lewton was inspired by reading Bierce to write his own story about a panther woman, "The Bagheeta". It was published in Weird Tales the same year and was the germ for his 1942 film Cat People.
