= An Unfinished Race =

- Short story by Ambrose Bierce
- Genre: Horror fiction

Publication
- Published in: 1888

"An Unfinished Race" is a short story by American Civil War soldier, wit, and writer Ambrose Bierce. The story, dealing with a mysterious disappearance of a man, was first published in The San Francisco Examiner on October 14, 1888, and was included in Bierce's collection Can Such Things Be? (1893). Bierce himself mysteriously disappeared in October 1914.

"An Unfinished Race" was collected in the third volume of Bierce's complete works, which included the ghost stories from his earlier book Can Such Things Be? The updated version included three new stories under the heading "Mysterious Disappearances", including "The Unfinished Race".

== Summary ==
The three-paragraph story is set in 1873. James Worson, a shoemaker who lived in Leamington Spa, Warwickshire, England, undertook a bet, while under the influence of liquor. The bet stated that he could run non-stop from Leamington Spa to Coventry, then back again, a distance of over 40 mi (64 km) (in reality, the full distance is approximately 22 mi (35 km)). He started to run, accompanied by the unnamed receiver of the bet, a linen draper named Barham Wise and a photographer named Hamerson Burns, who followed him in a wagon. Several miles into the run, Worson stumbled, fell "with a terrible cry", and vanished before he hit the ground. He was never seen again. The witnesses were suspects for a time, but were freed later that day. No trace of Worson was ever found.
