= The Moonlit Road =

Short story by Ambrose Bierce

"The Moonlit Road" is a gothic horror short story by American Civil War soldier, wit, and writer Ambrose Bierce. It was first published in the January 1907 issue of Cosmopolitan magazine, illustrated by Charles B. Falls. This story is presented in three parts and relates the tale of the murder of Julia Hetman from the perspective of her son, a man who may be her husband, and Julia herself, through a medium.

== Synopsis ==
The first part is narrated by Joel Hetman Jr., who is summoned home from college by his father, because his mother, Julia, has been found strangled. His father claims that he returned from a business trip and saw the figure of a man fleeing the home. Upon entering the house, he found his wife lying dead in her bedroom. Months later, the father and son are walking down a moonlit road when the father sees something and suddenly turns pale and disappears into the night.

The second part of the story is narrated by a man who describes himself as a wandering outcast, wracked by guilt. He recounts a dream in which he suspects his wife is being unfaithful and he returns from a business trip early to find a strange man leaving his house. When he finds his wife cowering in her room, he murders her in a fit of jealous rage. In another dream, his wife's ghost confronts him on a moonlit road at night and the strangulation marks are still visible on her neck.

The third and final section is the statement of the murder victim, Julia Hetman, delivered through a medium. She describes the night she was murdered. Alone in the house, she heard frightening noises and believed she was being hunted by some creature of the night. While she cowered in the corner of her room, a man entered and strangled her, but she never saw his face. Later, upon seeing that her husband and son were sad, she tried to communicate with them from the spirit world and offer them comfort. She was finally able to appear to them on the moonlit road, but only her husband could see her and he fled in fear.

== Analysis ==
Bierce harbored a fear of dying, and this frequently provided inspiration for his fiction. He experienced guilt due to his estrangement from his mother and he also divorced his wife after finding that she had been unfaithful. These traits may have inspired the fictional events in "The Moonlit Road".

The story may serve as an illustration of William James's thesis that "it is not so much the truth of events that matters, but how they are perceived, and the difference that they make to the perceiver". The murderer thought the ghost of his victim was aware of his culpability, for her eyes fixed on his "with an infinite gravity which is not reproach, nor hate, nor menace, nor anything less terrible than recognition". In an ironic twist, the ghost's testimony reveals she did not know who her murderer was and approached her husband "in the loving hope that he would be able to see her, smiling and consciously beautiful". But the murderer, plagued by guilt, noticed only the strangulation marks he had left on her throat.

As Jack Sullivan pointed out, Bierce's story "achieves an almost mind-numbing complexity by emerging from three fragmented points of view". The truth can be deduced only from the combination of three accounts, because "each of the characters is missing some vital element of the picture".

== Legacy ==
"The Moonlit Road" has been cited as a template for "In a Grove", a short story by Ryūnosuke Akutagawa in which the murder of a samurai is recounted by multiple witnesses and in the end, the victim gives deposition through a medium. Akira Kurosawa used this story as the basis for the plot of his famous film Rashomon.

In 2008, Bierce's short story was loosely adapted by Leor Baum as a 19-minute film titled The Moonlit Road. In 2009, the Library of America selected this story for inclusion in its two-century retrospective of American Fantastic Tales, edited by Peter Straub.
