= The Boarded Window =

1891 short story by Ambrose Bierce

"The Boarded Window: An Incident in the Life of an Ohio Pioneer" is a short story by American Civil War soldier and writer Ambrose Bierce. It was first published in The San Francisco Examiner on April 12, 1891, and was reprinted the same year in Bierce's collection Tales of Soldiers and Civilians. The setting for the story is the part of Ohio where Bierce's family lived until 1846.

== Plot ==
The story tells of a man named Murlock who lived alone in his cabin and was found dead one day. He was buried near the cabin next to his wife. The narrator tells the reader that this is all the known facts of the story, but there are some whispers about what had happened.

In 1820, Murlock had returned from hunting to find his wife in dire fits that eventually caused her to die. There was no means of saving her and thus, he found himself alone with her dead body. Later on, with her dead in the room, he fell asleep.

At that moment came in through the open window a long, wailing sound like the cry of a lost child in the far deeps of the darkening wood! But the man did not move. Again, and nearer than before, sounded that unearthly cry upon his failing sense. Perhaps it was a wild beast; perhaps it was a dream. For Murlock was asleep.

When he awoke there was some other presence in the room and he could feel it. The table shakes and there is movement but in the dark it is hard to discern. He fires his rifle to see what is going on and witnesses a panther dragging his wife by the neck. Upon examining his wife's corpse, Murlock sees that there is part of the panther's ear in between her teeth.

== Analysis ==
Bierce's story of a man who incorrectly thinks his wife has died of fever is thought to have been influenced by Edgar Allan Poe's "The Premature Burial". "That of Granny Magone" is Bierce's earlier treatment of a similar subject.

According to author Patricia Garcia, the entire story is structured around the boarded window, a kind of symbolic threshold which unites the turning points of the narrative and "functions to enhance the suspense by directing attention toward the question of why it is boarded".

== Adaptations ==
Okno zabite deskami (1971), directed by Janusz Majewski, is a film adaptation of the short story.

A radio adaptation of "The Boarded Window" was broadcast on April 3, 2001, via National Public Radio, as part of Radio Tales.
