= The Man and the Snake =

Short story by Ambrose Bierce

- Short story by Ambrose Bierce

Text available at Wikisource
- Country: United Kingdom
- Genre: Short story

Publication
- Published in: The San Francisco Examiner
- Publication type: Periodical
- Media type: Print
- Publication date: June 29, 1890

"The Man and the Snake" is a short story by American Civil War soldier, wit, and writer Ambrose Bierce. It tells of a man who dies of fright inspired by a toy snake with buttons for eyes. The story was published in The San Francisco Examiner on June 29, 1890.

== Plot summary ==
Harker Brayton is relaxing on a sofa when he notices a snake in the room. The narrator then proceeds to explain that the snake is that of Dr. During, the owner of the house that Harker is visiting. During is a zoologist and collector of different animals but most particularly, reptiles. Typically, he keeps them stored away in another wing of the house, nicknamed the Snakery.

Brayton initially decides to retreat from the room with the snake but wonders if he should confront the creature. He continues to stare at the snake, anticipating its plan of attack, but the snake continues to be motionless. Eventually he feels a blow to his face and chest.

Shortly thereafter, Dr. During is called to the room to check. He discovers that Harker is dead, having died of "a fit", most likely a seizure. When During looks in the room, he finds only a stuffed toy snake and wonders how it got in there.

== Analysis ==
"The Man and the Snake" shows that "death for Bierce was hardly the occasion for high tragic or sublime musings; nor was it particularly repulsive but instead a sort of low comedy, in which the joke is often played upon the reader".

Bierce explored the idea of a man rendered psychologically paralysed in several other narratives, including "One of the Missing". In this war story, a man dies from a hypnotic fear of the "menacing stare of the gun barrel", which actually is empty and harmless.

A similar plot was used by Harris Merton Lyon in the short story "An Unused Rattlesnake". The man finally killed the snake.
