= The Damned Thing =

Short story by Ambrose Bierce

- Short story by Ambrose Bierce
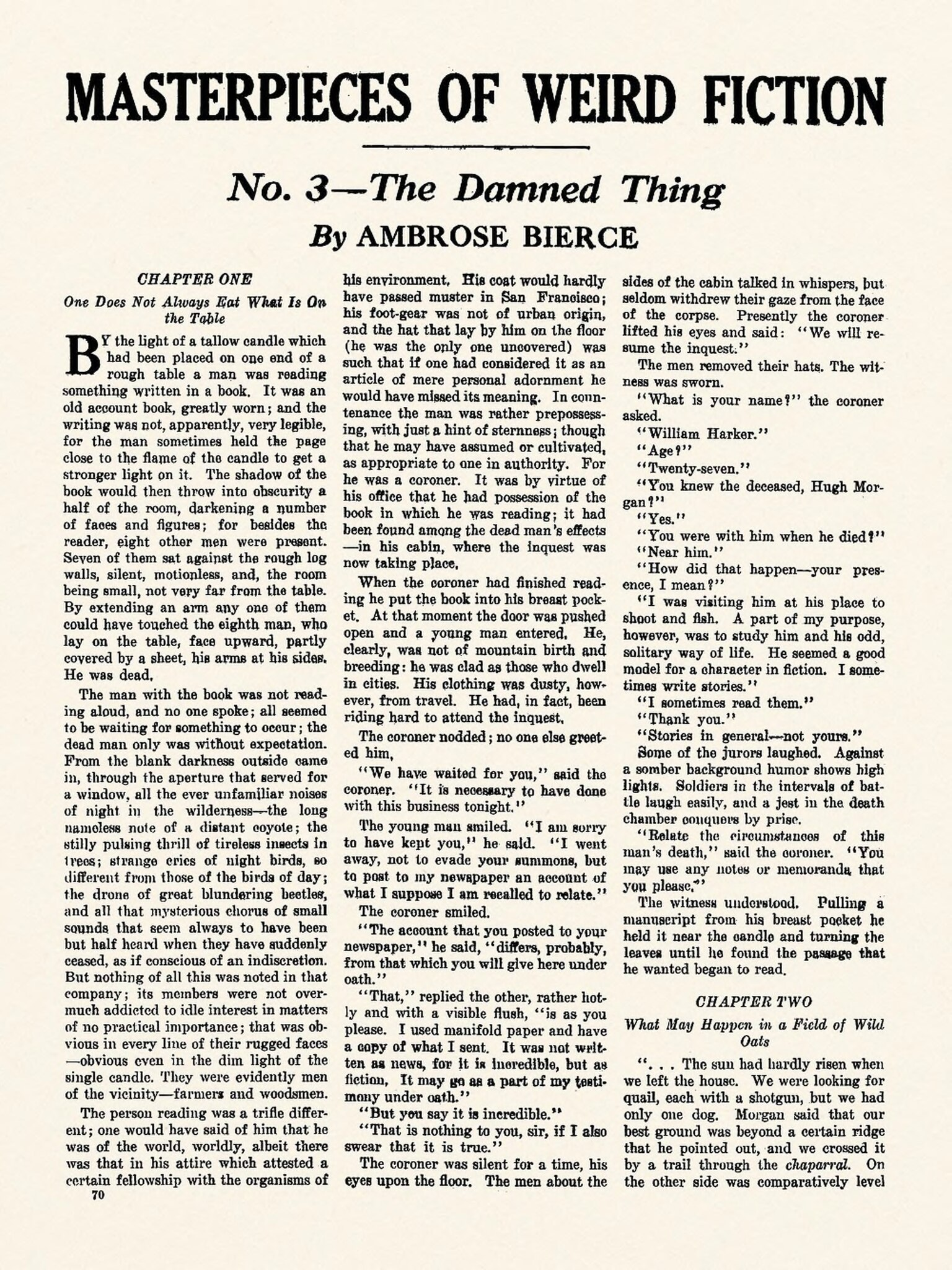
- A reprint of "The Damned Thing" in Weird Tales in 1923

Text available at Wikisource
- Country: United States
- Language: English
- Genres: Horror; Science fictionshort story

Publication
- Published in: Town Topics
- Media type: Print (magazine)
- Publication date: December 7, 1893

"The Damned Thing" is a horror short story written by American Civil War soldier, wit, and writer Ambrose Bierce. It first appeared in Town Topics on December 7, 1893.

== Summary ==
"The Damned Thing" is written in four parts, each with a comical subtitle. The story begins in Hugh Morgan's cabin, where local men have gathered around the battered corpse of Hugh Morgan to hold an inquest concerning his death. William Harker, a witness to the death, enters and is sworn in by the coroner to relate the circumstances. William reads a prepared statement about a hunting and fishing outing undertaken with Morgan. He and Morgan encountered a series of disturbances that Morgan referred to as "that damned thing". During the last encounter, Morgan fired his gun in fear, then fell to the ground and cried out in mortal agony. Harker saw his companion moving violently and erratically, while shouting and making disturbing cries. He thought Morgan was having convulsions because he didn't appear to be under attack. By the time Harker reached Morgan, Morgan was dead.

The coroner states that Morgan's diary contains no evidence in the matter of his death. A juror implies that Harker's testimony is symptomatic of insanity, and Harker leaves the inquest in anger. The jury concludes that Morgan was killed by a mountain lion.

The story becomes epistolary in nature, detailing entries from Morgan's diary. The journal covers the events leading up to Morgan's death as he becomes aware of an invisible creature that he is hunting. He infers that it lacks color or has a color that renders it invisible, but, to make sure he is not insane, he plans to invite Harker with him when he hunts "the damned thing".

== Analysis ==
Fighting invisible monsters is a classic horror trope that may be traced to the invisible supernatural entities in Fitz-James O'Brien's "What Was It?" (1859) and Guy de Maupassant's "The Horla" (1887). Later examples of invisibility in 19th-century fiction include "The Plattner Story" (1896) and The Invisible Man (1897) by H. G. Wells, and in 20th-century fiction "War with the Gizmos" (1958) by Murray Leinster.

In his take on the issue of invisibility, Bierce chose to "foreground the limitations of human senses", speculating that in the course of evolution an animal might have arisen whose color is invisible to the human eye. When accused of plagiarizing O'Brien, Bierce retorted that O'Brien's monster was "supernatural and impossible", whereas he described "a wild animal that cannot be seen, because, although opaque, like other animals, it is of invisible color". As a result, "The Damned Thing" has been classed as science fiction rather than as a Gothic narrative.

Bierce's quasi-scientific arguments for invisibility of certain creatures were later developed by H. P. Lovecraft in "The Colour Out of Space". In Lovecraft's story "The Unnamable", Randolph Carter is attacked by "some unseen entity of titanic size but undetermined nature".

== TV adaptations ==
In 1975, Yugoslav broadcaster Radio Television Belgrade produced a TV movie entitled Prokletinja (Serbo-Croatian for "The Damned Thing"), based on the story and directed by Branko Pleša.

"The Damned Thing" was very loosely adapted into a 2006 film of the same name as part of the television series Masters of Horror. It was directed by Tobe Hooper and written by Richard Christian Matheson. The TV adaptation focuses on an invisible force wreaking havoc on a man's family and town that forces the town members to kill one other and themselves.
