= The Middle Toe of the Right Foot =

1890 ghost story by Ambrose Bierce

"The Middle Toe of the Right Foot" is a ghost story by American Civil War soldier, wit, and writer Ambrose Bierce. It was first published in The San Francisco Examiner on April 17, 1890, and was reprinted the following year as part of Tales of Soldiers and Civilians.

The plot was apparently inspired by the front page Examiner news story from November 14, 1888, which described "an improbable duel with bowie knives in a suitably darkened room".

== Plot summary ==
A man named Manton has horribly killed his two children and his wife, the latter of whom lacked the middle toe of the right foot. Ten years later he returns much altered to the neighborhood; and, being secretly recognized, is provoked into a bowie-knife duel in the dark, to be held in the now-abandoned house where his crime was committed.

When the moment of the duel arrives a trick is played upon him; and he is left without an antagonist, shut in a night-black ground floor room of the reputedly haunted edifice, "with the thick dust of a decade on every hand". No knife is drawn against him, for only a thorough scare is intended.

On the next day, Manton is found crouched in a corner with a distorted face, dead of sheer fright at something he has seen. The only clue visible to the discoverers is one having supernatural implications:

In the dust of years that lay thick upon the floor — leading from the door by which they had entered, straight across the room to within a yard of Manton's crouching corpse — were three parallel lines of footprints — light but definite impressions of bare feet, the outer ones those of small children, the inner a woman's. From the point at which they ended they did not return; they pointed all one way.

== Criticism ==
"The Middle Toe of the Right Foot" has been viewed as the most effective of Bierce's stories built around the idea of supernatural revenge from beyond the grave. According to H. P. Lovecraft, the story is "clumsily developed, but has a powerful climax".

More recently, Donald T. Blume has criticized the story for being "laden with improbabilities" and having a "convoluted narrative structure".

== Adaptations ==
The Return (1973) is a British short film, adapted by Sture Rydman from "The Middle Toe of the Right Foot" and another story, "Nobody's House" by A. M. Burrage.
