= A Psychological Shipwreck =

1879 short story by Ambrose Bierce

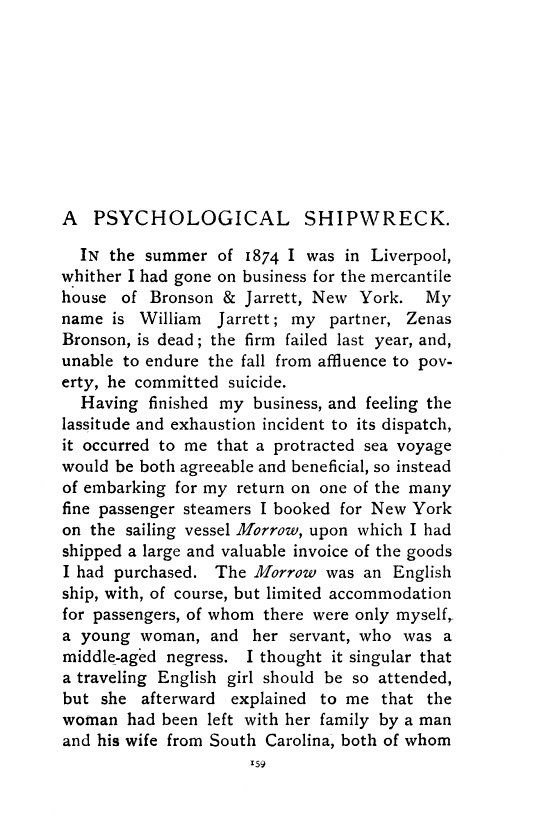
"A Psychological Shipwreck" as published in Can Such Things Be? in 1893

"A Psychological Shipwreck" is a short story by American Civil War soldier, wit, and writer Ambrose Bierce and published by The Argonaut under the title "My Shipwreck" on May 24, 1879. It was included in the 1893 collection Can Such Things Be?

== Plot summary ==
William Jarrett, the story's narrator, boards the Morrow, a sailing ship, in Liverpool. The ship is bound for New York City. Here he meets Miss Janette Harford. They become friendly and connect in a deep way which (William assures the reader) is not love. When he confesses to Janette, she looks at him strangely, before closing her eyes. She appears to have fallen asleep. Her finger has fallen on a passage from Denneker's Meditations concerning souls meeting and knowing one another beyond the body. A storm sets in. Havoc results. The ship begins to sink. After Janette is ripped away from William, he passes out.

Jarrett awakens in a berth on a steamship called the City of Prague. It had left port at the same time as the Morrow. Jarrett had originally been invited to go aboard it with his friend Gordon Doyle. Doyle finds Jarrett and tries to deduce what is going on. Jarrett slowly learns that he boarded the City of Prague when she set sail. He learns that Janette is Gordon's fiancée, who was sent on the Morrow so that Doyle could settle matters in New York before her arrival. The book that Doyle is reading is, again, Denneker's Meditations. The volume has a special passage marked. It is apparently a second copy, which Janette had given him. When Gordon and Jarrett arrive in New York, they look for the Morrow to arrive. It never returns.

== Allusion ==
It is quoted in the prologue to American science fiction writer Gene Wolfe's 1975 novella "Silhouette." The theme of apportation, in which human consciousness can move between physical locations, is integral to both works.

== Sources ==
- Grenander, M.E. Ambrose Bierce. NY: Twayne Publishers, 1971.
- McWilliams, Carey (1929; reprinted 1967). Ambrose Bierce: A Biography, Archon Books.
- Morris, Roy (1999) [1995]. Ambrose Bierce: alone in bad company. US: Oxford University Press. ISBN 978-0-19-512628-0.
- Nickell, Joseph 'Joe' (1992). Ambrose Bierce Is Missing and Other Historical Mysteries.
- O'Conner, Richard (1967). Ambrose Bierce: a Biography, with illustrations, Boston, Little, Brown and Company.
