= One of the Missing =

"One of the Missing" is a short story by American Civil War soldier, wit, and writer Ambrose Bierce. It was first published in The San Francisco Examiner on March 11, 1888 and was reprinted in Tales of Soldiers and Civilians (1891).

== Summary ==
The story is set in the American Civil War. Jerome Searing is an orderly for the Union Army. His general sends him on a mission to scout ahead and make sure that there are no surprises waiting for them. This is a typical mission for Jerome and he takes delight and care in scouting ahead.

Jerome comes upon a plantation and can see the Confederate Army in retreat. He takes aim to shoot one of them ("it is the business of a soldier to kill") but at the same time, a Confederate captain far off shoots a cannon at the structure that Jerome is hiding in. When Jerome comes to, he is partially buried in the debris and finds himself incapable of moving his body because of the way the debris covers him.

As he examines his surroundings and options, Jerome realizes that his rifle is pointed right at him. He anticipates it going off at any minute since it was primed to fire before the explosion. He tries to distract himself from the metal ring facing him with other thoughts and even by closing his eyes but every time he closes his eyes, he feels the bullet burying into him.

Eventually, Jerome finds a loose board that he tries to use to block the gun but when that is ineffective and he has lost all hope, he uses the board to help pull the trigger. The gun doesn't go off; it was fired when the building collapsed. His death could be from a range of different causes depending on speculation.

After hearing the explosion, his brother Adrian is ordered to move forward and explore the area that Jerome has scouted. As his party passes the destroyed building, they see a body in the wreckage but the debris has tinted his Federal coat gray and the state of death hints that the body had been dead so long that none of them realize who they are looking at.

== Analysis ==
The last section of the story, dealing with the protagonist's brother, was originally split into two parts, with the first part inserted in the middle of the narrative. The story was rewritten by Bierce for his Collected Works in order to highlight the subjective perception of time: what had seemed to the protagonist like hours of torture was actually a mere twenty-two minutes. This notion is also dramatised in Bierce's most successful story, "An Occurrence at Owl Creek Bridge".

"One of the Missing" shows influence of Maupassant's war story "Two Friends". Jerome finds himself in the position of a Confederate soldier that he thought to kill seconds before the explosion, just like the two fishers in Maupassant's story suddenly find themselves as helpless and doomed as the fish they caught: "seized by chance and subject to the bidding of a more powerful entity". Both stories spotlight the capriciousness and absurdity of war.

== See also ==
- One of the Missing, a 1968 film adaptation
- Four Days, a similar short story by Vsevolod Garshin written in 1877 and quickly translated into major languages, including English
- The Chamber Wind Music of Jack Cooper, contains music inspired by Bierce's story
