= Ambrose Bierce =

American writer (1842 – c. 1914)

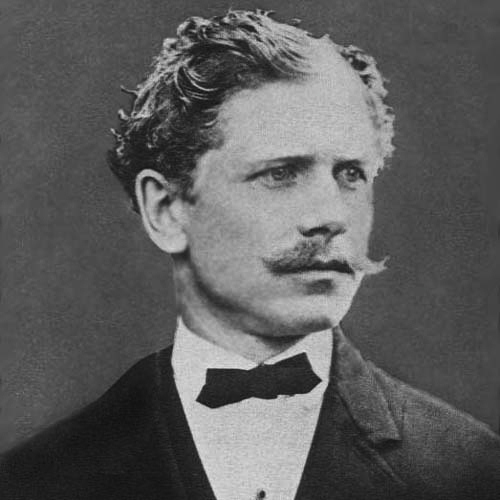
- Bierce c. 1866
- Born: Ambrose Gwinnett Bierce; June 24, 1842; Meigs County, Ohio, U.S.
- Disappeared: c. 1914 (aged 71–72)
- Occupations: Author; journalist; poet
- Spouse: Mary Ellen "Mollie" Day (m. 1871; div. 1904)
- Children: 3
- Relatives: Lucius V. Bierce (uncle)
- Writing career
- Genres: Satire; journalism; short story; horror fiction; war fiction; fantasy; science fiction; western; memoir; humor; literary criticism; poetry
- Notable work: "Chickamauga"; "An Occurrence at Owl Creek Bridge"; "The Death of Halpin Frayser"; "The Moonlit Road"; The Devil's Dictionary; Tales of Soldiers and Civilians
- Movement: American Realism
- Military career
- Allegiance: United States
- Branch: Union Army
- Service years: 1861–1866
- Rank: First lieutenant
- Unit: 9th Indiana Infantry Regiment
- Conflicts: American Civil War; Battle of Philippi; Battle of Rich Mountain; Battle of Shiloh; Battle of Chickamauga; Battle of Kennesaw Mountain; Franklin-Nashville Campaign

Ambrose Gwinnett Bierce (June 24, 1842 – c. 1914) was an American author, journalist, and poet. A prolific and versatile writer, Bierce was regarded as one of the most influential journalists in the United States and as a pioneering writer of realist fiction. For his horror writing, Michael Dirda ranked him alongside Edgar Allan Poe and H. P. Lovecraft. S. T. Joshi speculates that "he may well be the greatest satirist America has ever produced, and in this regard can take his place with such figures as Juvenal, Swift, and Voltaire." His war stories influenced Stephen Crane, Ernest Hemingway and others, and he was considered an influential and feared literary critic. In recent decades, Bierce has gained wider respect as a fabulist and poet.

His book The Devil's Dictionary was named one of "The 100 Greatest Masterpieces of American Literature" by the American Revolution Bicentennial Administration. His story "An Occurrence at Owl Creek Bridge" has been described as "one of the most famous and frequently anthologized stories in American literature", and his book Tales of Soldiers and Civilians (also published as In the Midst of Life) was named by the Grolier Club one of the 100 most influential American books printed before 1900.

In 1913, Bierce told reporters that he was travelling to Mexico to gain first-hand experience of the Mexican Revolution. He disappeared and was never seen again.

== Early life ==
Bierce was born in a log cabin at Horse Cave Creek in Meigs County, Ohio, on June 24, 1842, to Marcus Aurelius Bierce (1799–1876) and Laura Sherwood Bierce. He was of English ancestry; his forebears came to North America between 1620 and 1640 as part of the Puritan migration. His mother was a descendant of William Bradford. He often wrote critically of "Puritan values" and people who "made a fuss" about genealogy. He was the 10th of 13 children, all of whom were given names beginning with the letter "A". In order of birth, the Bierce siblings were Abigail, Amelia, Ann, Addison, Aurelius, Augustus, Almeda, Andrew, Albert, Ambrose, Arthur, Adelia, and Aurelia. His uncle was Ohio politician and military officer Lucius V. Bierce.

His parents were a poor but literary couple who instilled in him a deep love for books and writing. Bierce grew up in Kosciusko County, Indiana, attending high school at the county seat, Warsaw. He left home at 15 to become a printer's devil at a small abolitionist newspaper, the Northern Indianan.

== Military career ==
Bierce briefly attended the Kentucky Military Institute until it closed after a fire in 1860. At the start of the American Civil War, he enlisted in the Union Army's 9th Indiana Infantry. He participated in the operations in Western Virginia (1861), was present at the Battle of Philippi (the first organized land action of the war) and received newspaper attention for his daring rescue, under fire, of a gravely wounded comrade at the Battle of Rich Mountain. Bierce fought at the Battle of Shiloh (April 1862), a terrifying experience that became a source for several short stories and the memoir "What I Saw of Shiloh".

In April 1863 he was commissioned a first lieutenant, and served on the staff of General William Babcock Hazen as a topographical engineer, making maps of likely battlefields. As a staff officer, Bierce became known to leading generals such as George H. Thomas and Oliver O. Howard, both of whom supported his application for admission to West Point in May 1864. General Hazen believed Bierce would graduate from the military academy "with distinction" and William T. Sherman also endorsed the application for admission, even though stating he had no personal acquaintance with Bierce. In June 1864, Bierce sustained a traumatic brain injury at the Battle of Kennesaw Mountain and spent the rest of the summer on furlough, returning to active duty in September. His last action of the war was in the Franklin-Nashville campaign. In January 1865 he resigned his commission due to the continued effects of his head injury.

His military career resumed in mid-1866, when he joined General Hazen as part of an expedition to inspect military outposts across the Great Plains. The expedition traveled by horseback and wagon from Omaha, Nebraska, arriving toward year's end in San Francisco, California. In the city, Bierce was awarded the rank of brevet major before resigning from the Army.

== Journalism ==
Bierce remained in San Francisco for many years, eventually becoming famous as a contributor or editor of newspapers and periodicals, including The San Francisco News Letter, The Argonaut, the Overland Monthly, The Californian and The Wasp. A selection of his crime reporting from The San Francisco News Letter was included in the Library of America anthology True Crime.

Bierce lived and wrote in England from 1872 to 1875, contributing to Fun magazine. His first book, The Fiend's Delight, a compilation of his articles, was published in London in 1873 by John Camden Hotten under the pseudonym "Dod Grile".

Returning to the United States, he again took up residence in San Francisco. From 1879 to 1880, he traveled to Rockerville and Deadwood in the Dakota Territory, to try his hand as local manager for a New York mining company. When the company failed he returned to San Francisco and resumed his career in journalism.

From January 1, 1881, until September 11, 1885, he was editor of The Wasp magazine, in which he began a column titled "Prattle". He also became one of the first regular columnists and editorialists on William Randolph Hearst's newspaper, the San Francisco Examiner, eventually becoming one of the most prominent and influential writers and journalists on the West Coast. He remained associated with Hearst Newspapers until 1909.

=== Railroad refinancing bill ===
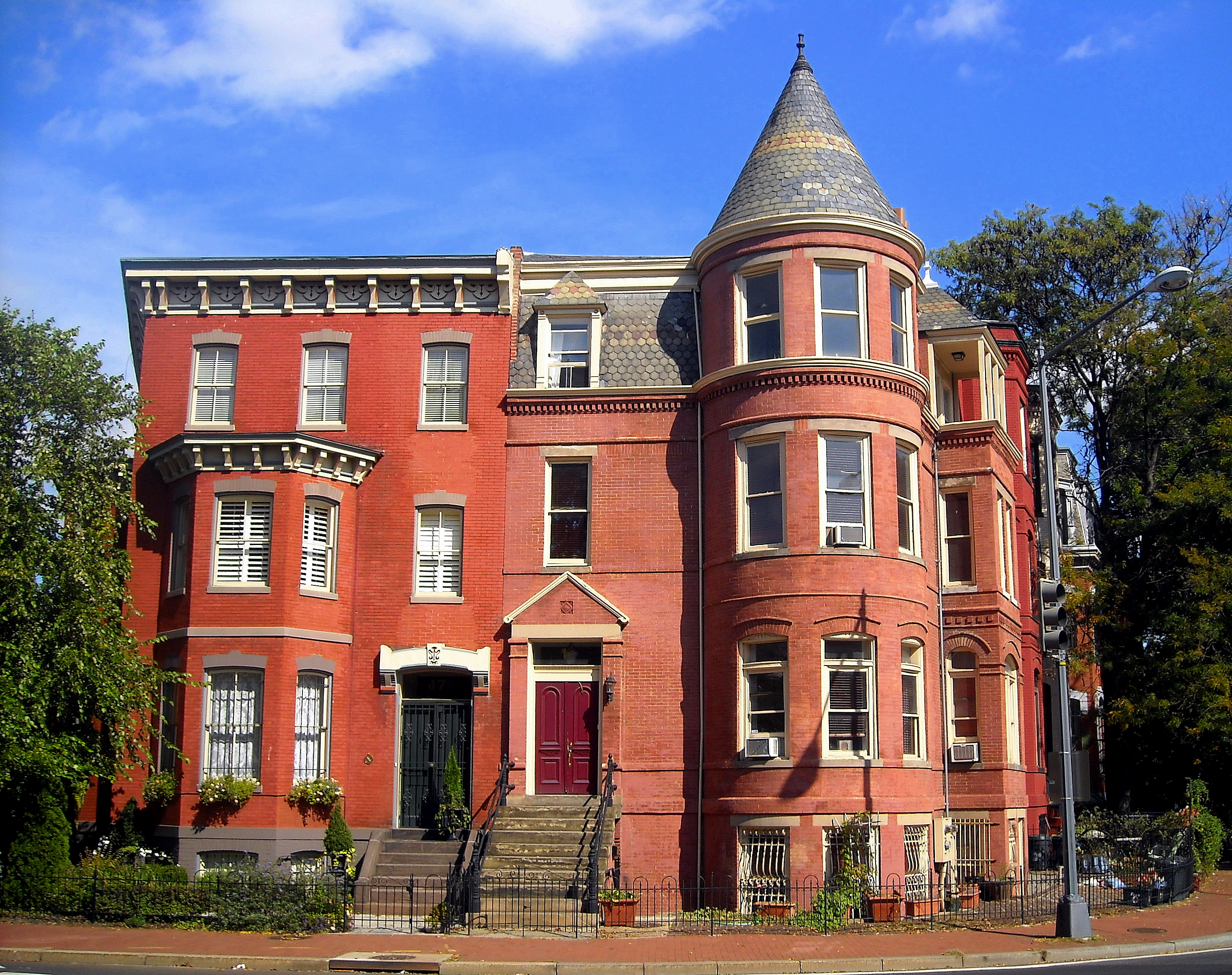
Bierce's residence (right), 18 Logan Circle, Washington, D.C.

The Union Pacific and Central Pacific railroad companies had received large, low-interest loans from the U.S. government to build the first transcontinental railroad. Central Pacific executive Collis P. Huntington persuaded a friendly member of Congress to introduce a bill excusing the companies from repaying the loans, amounting to $130 million (worth $5.03 billion today).

In January 1896 Hearst dispatched Bierce to Washington, D.C., to foil this attempt. The essence of the plot was secrecy; the railroads' advocates hoped to get the bill through Congress without any public notice or hearings. When the angered Huntington confronted Bierce on the steps of the Capitol and told Bierce to name his price, Bierce's answer ended up in newspapers nationwide: "My price is one hundred thirty million dollars. If, when you are ready to pay, I happen to be out of town, you may hand it over to my friend, the Treasurer of the United States."

Bierce's coverage and diatribes on the subject aroused such public wrath that the bill was defeated. Bierce returned to California in November.

In 1899, he moved back to Washington, D.C., and remained a resident until his disappearance in 1913. The best known of his four different residences in the city during this time perhaps is the townhouse at 18 Logan Circle.

=== McKinley controversy ===
Bierce's long newspaper career was often controversial because of his penchant for biting social criticism and satire. On several occasions his columns stirred up a storm of hostile reaction, which created difficulties for Hearst. One of the most notable of these incidents occurred following the assassination of President William McKinley in 1901 when Hearst's opponents turned a poem Bierce had written about the assassination of Governor William Goebel of Kentucky in 1900 into a cause célèbre.

Bierce meant his poem to express a national mood of dismay and fear, but after McKinley was shot in 1901, it seemed to foreshadow the crime:

The bullet that pierced Goebel's breast
Can not be found in all the West;
Good reason, it is speeding here
To stretch McKinley on his bier.

Hearst was accused by rival newspapers—and by then-Secretary of War Elihu Root—of having called for McKinley's assassination. Despite a national uproar that ended Hearst's ambitions for the presidency (and even his membership in the Bohemian Club), Hearst kept employing Bierce.

== Literary writer ==
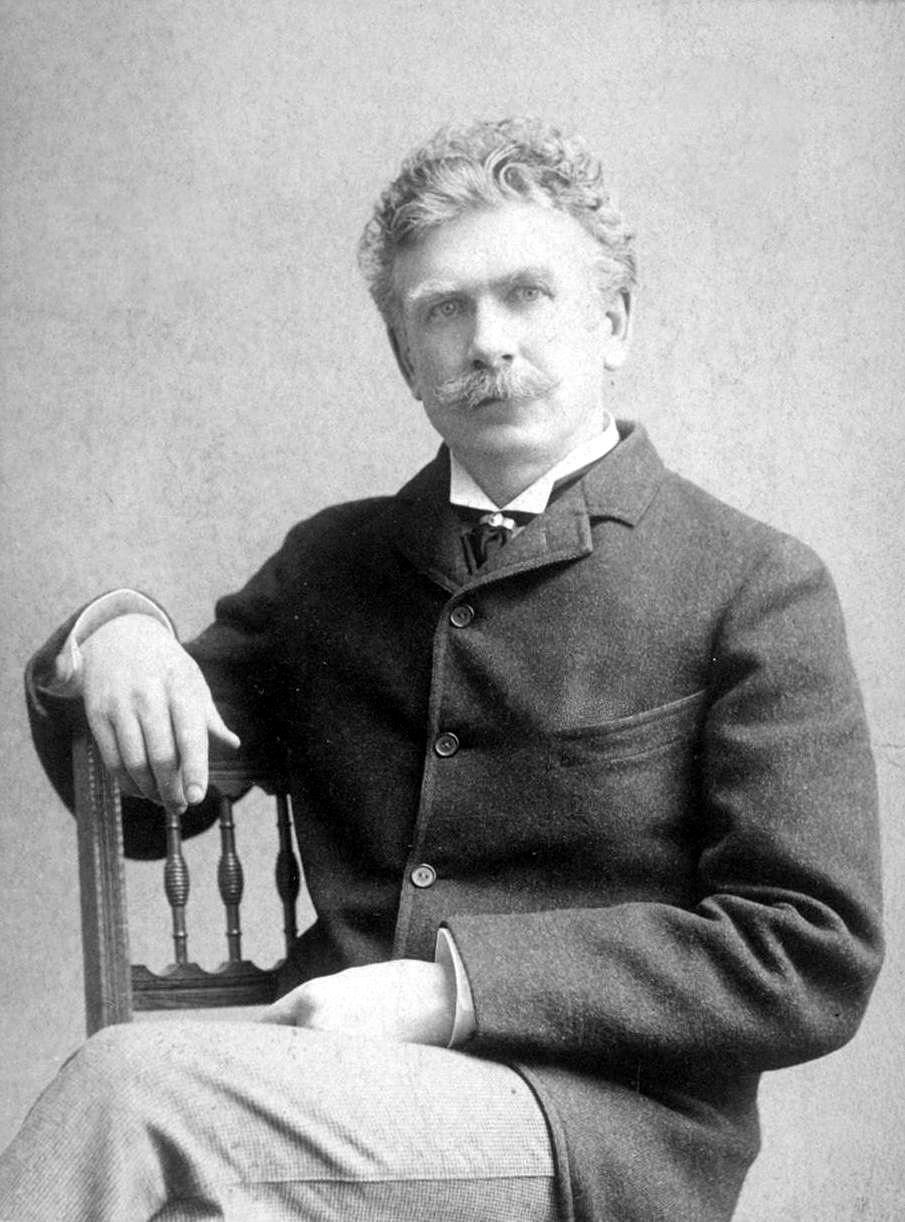
Bierce, 1892

During his lifetime, Bierce was better known as a journalist than as a fiction writer. His most popular stories were written in rapid succession between 1888 and 1891, in what was characterized as "a tremendous burst of consummate art". Bierce's works often highlight the inscrutability of the universe and the absurdity of death.

Bierce wrote realistically of the terrible things he had seen in the war in such stories as "An Occurrence at Owl Creek Bridge", "A Horseman in the Sky", "One of the Missing" and "Chickamauga". His grimly realistic cycle of 25 war stories has been called "the greatest anti-war document in American literature". To the end of his life, nothing would so infuriate him as hearing accounts of the honor and glory of war from people who'd never seen or experienced it personally.

According to Milton Subotsky, Bierce helped pioneer the psychological horror story. In addition to his ghost and war stories, he also published several volumes of poetry. His Fantastic Fables anticipated the ironic style of grotesquerie that became a more common genre in the 20th century.

One of Bierce's most famous works is his much-quoted The Devil's Dictionary, originally an occasional newspaper item, first published in book form in 1906 as The Cynic's Word Book. Described as "howlingly funny", it consists of satirical definitions of English words which lampoon cant and political double-talk. Bierce edited the twelve volumes of The Collected Works of Ambrose Bierce, which were published from 1909 to 1912. The seventh volume consists solely of The Devil's Dictionary.

Bierce has been criticized by his contemporaries and later scholars for deliberately pursuing improbability and for his penchant toward "trick endings". In his later stories, apparently under the influence of Maupassant, Bierce "dedicated himself to shocking the audience", as if his purpose was "to attack the reader's smug intellectual security".

Bierce's bias towards Naturalism has also been noted: "The biting, deriding quality of his satire, unbalanced by any compassion for his targets, was often taken as petty meanness, showing contempt for humanity and an intolerance to the point of merciless cruelty".

Stephen Crane was of the minority of Bierce's contemporaries who valued Bierce's experimental short stories. In his essay "Supernatural Horror in Literature", H. P. Lovecraft characterized Bierce's fictional work as "grim and savage." Lovecraft goes on to say that nearly all of Bierce's stories are of the horror genre and some shine as great examples of weird fiction.

Critic and novelist William Dean Howells said, "Mr. Bierce is among our three greatest writers." When told this, Bierce responded, "I am sure Mr. Howells is the other two."

== Personal life ==
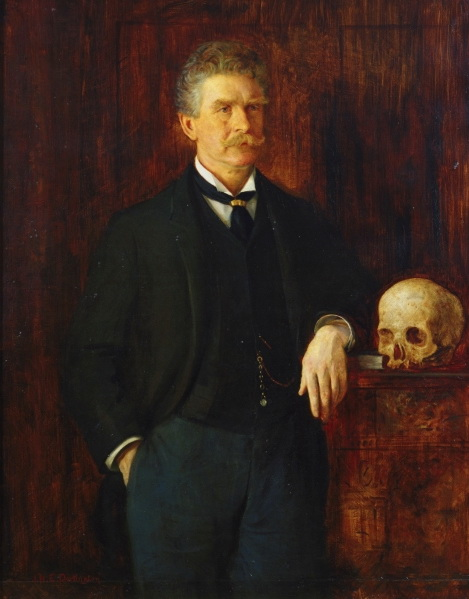
Ambrose Bierce, by J.H.E. Partington

Bierce married Mary Ellen "Mollie" Day on December 25, 1871. They had three children: sons Day (1872–1889) and Leigh (1874–1901) and daughter Helen (1875–1940). Both of Bierce's sons died before he did. Day committed suicide after a romantic rejection (he non-fatally shot the woman of his affections along with her fiancé beforehand), and Leigh died of pneumonia related to alcoholism. Bierce separated from his wife in 1888, after discovering compromising letters to her from an admirer. They divorced in 1904. Mollie Day Bierce died the following year.

Bierce was an avowed agnostic and strongly rejected the divinity of Christ. He had lifelong asthma, as well as complications from his war wounds, most notably episodes of fainting and irritability assignable to the traumatic brain injury experienced at Kennesaw Mountain.

== Disappearance ==
In October 1913 Bierce, then age 71, departed from Washington, D.C., for a tour of his old Civil War battlefields. According to some reports, by December he had passed through Louisiana and Texas, crossing by way of El Paso into Mexico, which was in the throes of revolution. In Ciudad Juárez he joined Pancho Villa's army as an observer, and in that role he witnessed the Battle of Tierra Blanca.

It was reported that Bierce accompanied Villa's army as far as the city of Chihuahua. His last known communication with the world was a letter he wrote there to Blanche Partington, a close friend, dated December 26, 1913. After closing this letter by saying, "As to me, I leave here tomorrow for an unknown destination," he vanished without a trace, one of the most famous disappearances in American literary history.

=== Theories ===
Bierce's ultimate fate remains a mystery. He wrote in one of his final letters: "Good-bye. If you hear of my being stood up against a Mexican stone wall and shot to rags, please know that I think it is a pretty good way to depart this life. It beats old age, disease, or falling down the cellar stairs. To be a Gringo in Mexico—ah, that is euthanasia!"

Skeptic Joe Nickell noted that the letter to Partington had not been found; all that existed was a notebook belonging to his secretary and companion Carrie Christiansen. Partington concluded that Bierce deliberately concealed his true whereabouts when he finally went to a selected location in the Grand Canyon and died as a result of suicide.

There was an official investigation by U.S. consular officials of the disappearance of one of its citizens. Some of Villa's men were questioned at the time of his disappearance and afterwards, with contradictory accounts. U.S. Army chief of staff Hugh L. Scott contacted Pancho Villa's U.S. representative Felix A. Sommerfeld, and Sommerfeld investigated the disappearance. Bierce was said to have been last seen in the city of Chihuahua in January.

Oral tradition in Sierra Mojada, Coahuila, documented by priest James Lienert states that Bierce was executed by a Huertista firing squad in the town's cemetery.

== Legacy and influence ==
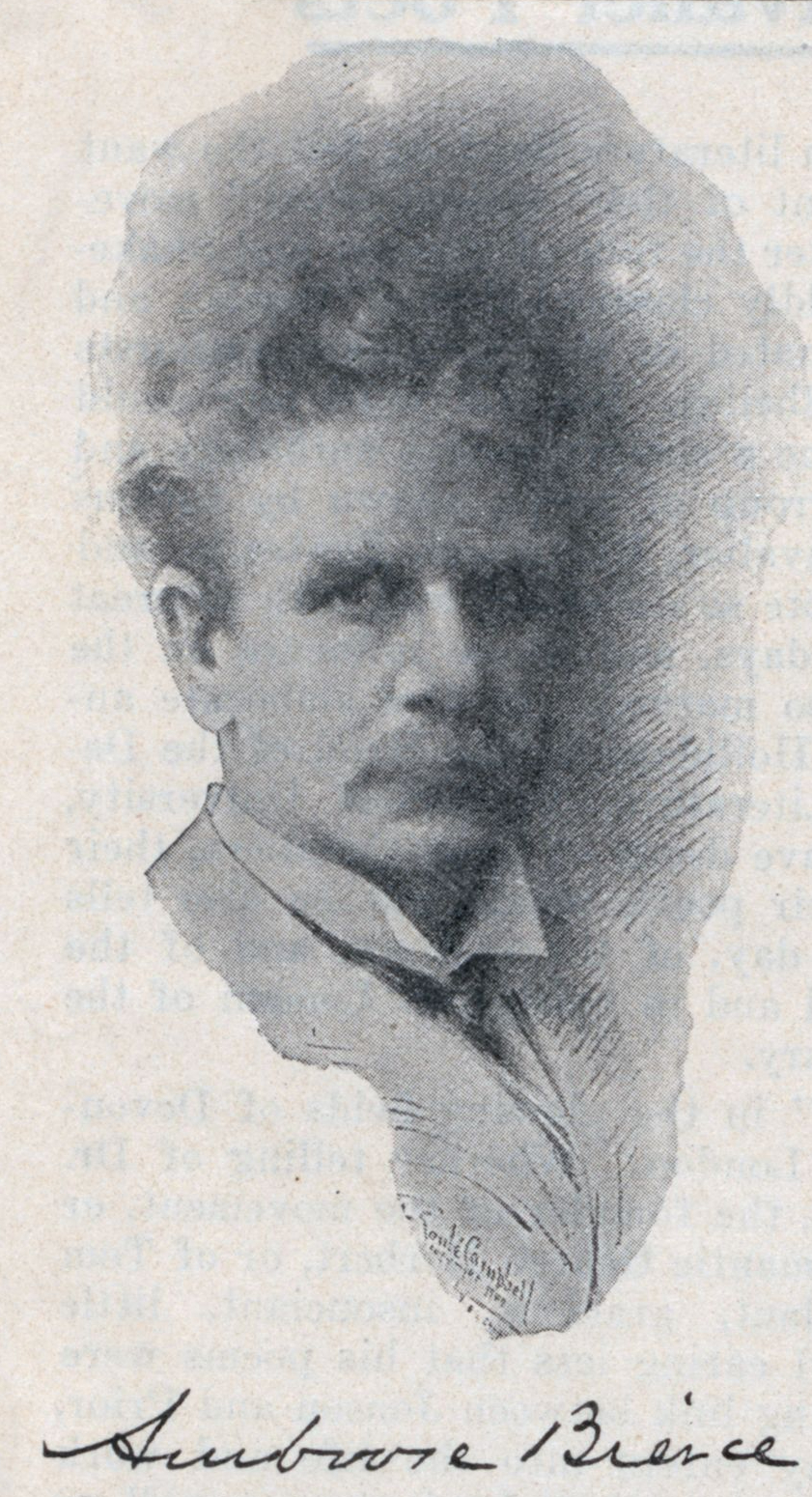
Bierce and autograph

Bierce has been fictionalized in more than 50 novels, short stories, movies, television shows, stage plays and comic books. Most of these works draw upon Bierce's vivid personality, colorful wit, relationships with famous people such as Jack London and William Randolph Hearst, or, quite frequently, his mysterious disappearance.

Bierce has been portrayed by such well-known authors as Ray Bradbury, Jack Finney, Carlos Fuentes, Winston Groom, Robert Heinlein, and Don Swaim. Some works featuring a fictional Ambrose Bierce have received favorable reviews, generated international sales, or earned major awards.

Bierce's short stories "Haita the Shepherd" and "An Inhabitant of Carcosa" are believed to have influenced early weird fiction writer Robert W. Chambers's tales of The King in Yellow (1895), which featured Hastur, Carcosa, Lake Hali and other names and locations initiated in Bierce's tales. Chambers in turn went on to influence H. P. Lovecraft and much of modern horror fiction.

In 1918, H. L. Mencken called Bierce "the one genuine wit that These States have ever seen."

At least three films have been made of Bierce's story "An Occurrence at Owl Creek Bridge". A silent film version, The Bridge, was made in 1929 by Charles Vidor. A French version, La Rivière du Hibou, directed by Robert Enrico, was released in 1961; this black-and-white film faithfully recounts the original narrative using voiceover. It was later reused for broadcast as one of the final episodes of The Twilight Zone in 1964. Prior to The Twilight Zone, the story had been adapted as an episode of Alfred Hitchcock Presents. Another version, directed by Brian James Egen, was released in 2005. It was also adapted for the CBS radio programs Escape (1947), Suspense (1956, 1957, 1959) and Radio Mystery Theater (1974).

In his 1932 book Wild Talents, American writer and researcher into anomalous phenomena Charles Fort wrote about the unexplained disappearances of Ambrose Bierce and Ambrose Small, and asked, "Was somebody collecting Ambroses?"

Actor James Lanphier (1920–1969) played Bierce, with James Hampton as William Randolph Hearst, in the 1964 episode "The Paper Dynasty", of the syndicated western television series Death Valley Days, hosted by Stanley Andrews. In the story line, Hearst struggles to turn a profit despite increased circulation of the San Francisco Examiner. Robert O. Cornthwaite appears as Sam Chamberlain.

Carlos Fuentes's novel The Old Gringo (1985) is a fictionalized account of Bierce's disappearance; it was later adapted into the film Old Gringo (1989), starring Gregory Peck in the title role. Fuentes stated: "What started this novel was my admiration for Ambrose Bierce and for his Tales of Soldiers and Civilians."

Two adaptations were made of Bierce's story "Eyes of the Panther". One version was developed for Shelley Duvall's Nightmare Classics series and was released in 1990. It runs about 60 minutes. A shorter version was released in 2007 by director Michael Barton and runs about 23 minutes.

Bierce was a major character in a series of mystery books written by Oakley Hall and published between 1998 and 2006.

Biographer Richard O'Connor argued that, "War was the making of Bierce as a man and a writer... [he became] truly capable of transferring the bloody, headless bodies and boar-eaten corpses of the battlefield onto paper."

Essayist Clifton Fadiman wrote, "Bierce was never a great writer. He has painful faults of vulgarity and cheapness of imagination. But ... his style, for one thing, will preserve him; and the purity of his misanthropy, too, will help to keep him alive."

Author Alan Gullette argues that Bierce's war tales may be the best writing on war, outranking his contemporary Stephen Crane (author of The Red Badge of Courage) and even Ernest Hemingway.

The short film "Ah! Silenciosa" (1999), starring Jim Beaver as Bierce, weaves elements of "An Occurrence at Owl Creek Bridge" into a speculation on Bierce's disappearance.

Bierce's trip to Mexico and disappearance provide the background for the vampire horror film From Dusk Till Dawn 3: The Hangman's Daughter (2000), in which Bierce's character plays a central role. Bierce's fate is the subject of Gerald Kersh's "The Oxoxoco Bottle" (aka "The Secret of the Bottle"), which appeared in The Saturday Evening Post on December 7, 1957, and was reprinted in the anthology Men Without Bones. Bierce reappears in the future on Mount Shasta in Robert Heinlein's novella, "Lost Legacy".

American composer Rodney Waschka II composed an opera, Saint Ambrose (2002), based on Bierce's life.

In 2002, the American Conservatory Theater in San Francisco premiered David Lang's one-act opera, The Difficulty of Crossing a Field, based on Bierce's one-page short story by the same title. The original production ran 75 minutes.

In 2005, author Kurt Vonnegut stated that he considered "An Occurrence at Owl Creek Bridge" the "greatest American short story" and a work of "flawless ... American genius".

"The Damned Thing" was adapted twice. The first time was in 1975 into a Yugoslav TV-movie, Prokletinja. The second time was into a 2006 Masters of Horror episode of the same title directed by Tobe Hooper.

Don Swaim writes of Bierce's life and disappearance in The Assassination of Ambrose Bierce: A Love Story (2015).

Ambrose Bierce features as a character in Winston Groom's 2016 novel El Paso. In the novel, Bierce is personally executed by Pancho Villa.

Weird-fiction critic and editor S. T. Joshi has cited Bierce as an influence on his own work, and has praised him for his satirical wit, saying "Bierce will remain an equivocal figure in American and world literature chiefly because his dark view of humanity is, by its very nature, unpopular. Most people like writing that is cheerful and uplifting, even though a substantial proportion of the world's great literature is quite otherwise."

== Works ==
=== Volumes published ===
==== Published during Bierce's lifetime ====
- The Fiend's Delight (as by "Dod Grile"). (London: John Camden Hotten, 1873). Stories, satire, journalism, poetry.
- Nuggets and Dust Panned Out in California (as by "Dod Grile"). (London: Chatto & Windus, 1873). Stories, satire, epigrams, journalism.
- Cobwebs from an Empty Skull (as by "Dod Grile"). (London and New York: George Routledge & Sons, 1874). Fables, stories, journalism.
- (with Thomas A. Harcourt) The Dance of Death (as by "William Herman"). (San Francisco: H. Keller & Co., 1877). Satire.
- Map of the Black Hills Region, Showing the Gold Mining District and the Seat of the Indian War (San Francisco: A. L. Bancroft & Co., 1877). Nonfiction: map.
- Tales of Soldiers and Civilians (San Francisco: E. L. G. Steele, 1891; many subsequent editions, some under the title In the Midst of Life). Fiction: stories.
- (with G. A. Danziger) The Monk and the Hangman's Daughter (Chicago: F. J. Schulte & Co., 1892). Fiction: novel (translation of Der Mönch von Berchtesgaden by Richard Voss).
- Black Beetles in Amber (San Francisco and New York: Western Authors Publishing, 1892). Poetry.
- Can Such Things Be? (New York: Cassell, 1893). Fiction: stories.
- How Blind Is He (San Francisco: F. Soulé Campbell, c. 1896). Poetry.
- Fantastic Fables (New York and London: G. P. Putnam's Sons, 1899). Fiction: fables.
- Shapes of Clay (San Francisco: W. E. Wood George Sterling, 1903). Poetry.
- The Cynic's Word Book (New York: Doubleday, Page & Co., 1906). Satire.
- A Son of the Gods and A Horseman in the Sky (San Francisco: Paul Elder, 1907). Fiction: stories.
- Write It Right: A Little Blacklist of Literary Faults (New York and Washington, D.C.: Neale Publishing, 1909). Nonfiction: precise use of words.
- The Shadow on the Dial and Other Essays S. O. Howes, ed. (San Francisco: A. M. Robertson, 1909). Collected journalism.
- The Collected Works of Ambrose Bierce (New York and Washington, D.C.: Neale Publishing, 1909–1912):
  - Volume I: Ashes of the Beacon
  - Volume II: In the Midst of Life: Tales of Soldiers and Civilians
  - Volume III: Can Such Things Be?
  - Volume IV: Shapes of Clay
  - Volume V: Black Beetles in Amber
  - Volume VI: The Monk and the Hangman's Daughter; Fantastic Fables
  - Volume VII: The Devil's Dictionary
  - Volume VIII: Negligible Tales; On with the Dance; Epigrams
  - Volume IX: Tangential Views
  - Volume X: The Opinionator
  - Volume XI: Antepenultimata
  - Volume XII: In Motley

==== Published posthumously ====
Fiction

- My Favorite Murder (New York: Curtis J. Kirch, 1916)
- A Horseman in the Sky: A Watcher by the Dead: The Man and the Snake (San Francisco: Book Club of California, 1920)
- Ten Tales (London: First Edition Club, 1925)
- Fantastic Debunking Fables (Girard, KS: Haldeman-Julius, 1926)
- An Occurrence at Owl Creek Bridge and Other Stories (Girard, KS: Haldeman-Julius, c. 1926)
- The Horseman in the Sky and Other Stories (Girard, KS: Haldeman-Julius, c. 1926)
- Tales of Ghouls and Ghosts (Girard, KS: Haldeman-Julius, c. 1927)
- Tales of Haunted Houses (Girard, KS: Haldeman-Julius, c. 1927)
- My Favorite Murder and Other Stories (Girard, KS: Haldeman-Julius, c. 1927)
- Ghost and Horror Stories, E. F. Bleiler, ed. (New York: Dover, 1964)
- The Complete Short Stories of Ambrose Bierce, Ernest Jerome Hopkins, ed. (Garden City, NY: Doubleday, 1970)
- The Stories and Fables of Ambrose Bierce, Edward Wagenknecht, ed. (Owings Mills, MD: Stemmer House, 1977)
- For the Ahkoond (West Warwick, RI: Necromomicon Press, 1980)
- A Horseman in the Sky (Skokie, IL: Black Cat Press, 1983)
- One Summer Night
- One of the Missing: Tales of the War Between the States (Covelo, CA: Yolla Bolly Press, 1991)
- Civil War Stories (New York: Dover, 1994)
- An Occurrence at Owl Creek Bridge and Other Stories (London: Penguin, 1995)
- The Moonlit Road and Other Ghost and Horror Stories (Mineola, NY: Dover, 1998)
- A Deoderizer of Dead Dogs, Carl Japikse, ed. (Alpharetta, GA: Enthea Press, 1998)
- The Collected Fables of Ambrose Bierce, S. T. Joshi, ed. (Columbus: Ohio State University Press, 2000)
- The Short Fiction of Ambrose Bierce: A Comprehensive Edition (3 vols.), S. T. Joshi, Lawrence I. Berkove, and David E. Schultz, eds. (Knoxville: University of Tennessee, 2006)
- Ambrose Bierce: Masters of the Weird Tale, S. T. Joshi, ed. (Lakewood, CO: Centipede Press, 2013)

Satire

- Extraordinary Opinions on Commonplace Subjects (Girard, KS: Haldeman-Julius, c. 1927)
- A Cynic Looks at Life (Girard, KS: Haldeman-Julius, c. 1927)
- The Sardonic Humor of Ambrose Bierce, George Barkin, ed. (New York: Dover, 1963)
- The Fall of the Republic and Other Political Satires, S. T. Joshi and David E. Schultz, eds. (Knoxville: University of Tennessee, 2000)

Poetry

- An Invocation (San Francisco: John Henry Nash/Book Club of California, 1928)
- The Lion and the Lamb (Berkeley: Archetype Press, 1939)
- A Vision of Doom: Poems by Ambrose Bierce , Donald Sidney-Fryer, ed. (West Kingston, RI: Donald M. Grant, Publisher 1980)
- Poems of Ambrose Bierce, M. E. Grenander, ed. (Lincoln: University of Nebraska, 1995)

Journalism

- Selections from Prattle, Carroll D. Hall, ed. (San Francisco: Book Club of California, 1936)
- The Ambrose Bierce Satanic Reader, Ernest Jerome Hopkins, ed. (Garden City, NY: Doubleday, 1968)
- Skepticism and Dissent: Selected Journalism from 1898 to 1901, Lawrence I. Berkove, ed. (Ann Arbor: Delmas, 1980)

Autobiography

- Iconoclastic Memories of the Civil War: Bits of Autobiography (Girard, KS: Haldeman-Julius, c. 1927)
- Battle Sketches (London: First Editions Club, 1930)
- A Sole Survivor: Bits of Autobiography, S. T. Joshi and David E. Schultz, eds. (Knoxville: University of Tennessee, 1998)

Collections of mixed types of content

- The Collected Writings of Ambrose Bierce (New York: Citadel Press, 1946)
- Ambrose Bierce's Civil War, William McCann, ed. (Chicago: Gateway Editions, 1956)
- The Devil's Advocate: An Ambrose Bierce Reader, Brian St. Pierre, ed. (San Francisco: Chronicle Books, 1987)
- An Occurrence at Owl Creek Bridge and Selected Works (Des Moines: Perfection Form Co., 1991)
- Shadows of Blue and Gray: The Civil War Writings of Ambrose Bierce, Brian M. Thomsen, ed. (New York: Forge, 2002)
- Phantoms of a Blood-Stained Period: The Complete Civil War Writings of Ambrose Bierce, Russell Duncan and David J. Klooster, eds. (Amherst: University of Massachusetts, 2002)
- Ambrose Bierce: The Devil's Dictionary, Tales, and Memoirs, S. T. Joshi, ed. (Boone, IA: Library of America, 2011)
- Collected Essays and Journalism: Volume 1: 1867–1869, David E. Schultz and S. T. Joshi, eds. (Seattle: Sarnath Press, 2022)
- Collected Essays and Journalism: Volume 2: 1869–1870, David E. Schultz and S. T. Joshi, eds. (Seattle: Sarnath Press, 2022)
- Collected Essays and Journalism: Volume 3: 1870–1871, David E. Schultz and S. T. Joshi, eds. (Seattle: Sarnath Press, 2022)
- Collected Essays and Journalism: Volume 4: 1871–1872, David E. Schultz and S. T. Joshi, eds. (Seattle: Sarnath Press, 2022)
- Collected Essays and Journalism: Volume 5: 1872–1873, David E. Schultz and S. T. Joshi, eds. (Seattle: Sarnath Press, 2022)
- Collected Essays and Journalism: Volume 6: 1873–1874, David E. Schultz and S. T. Joshi, eds. (Seattle: Sarnath Press, 2023)
- Collected Essays and Journalism: Volume 7: 1874–1875, David E. Schultz and S. T. Joshi, eds. (Seattle: Sarnath Press, 2023)
- Collected Essays and Journalism: Volume 8: 1875–1876, David E. Schultz and S. T. Joshi, eds. (Seattle: Sarnath Press, 2023)
- Collected Essays and Journalism: Volume 9: 1877–1878, David E. Schultz and S. T. Joshi, eds. (Seattle: Sarnath Press, 2023)
- Collected Essays and Journalism: Volume 10: 1878–1880, David E. Schultz and S. T. Joshi, eds. (Seattle: Sarnath Press, 2023)
- Collected Essays and Journalism: Volume 11: 1881, David E. Schultz and S. T. Joshi, eds. (Seattle: Sarnath Press, 2023)
- Collected Essays and Journalism: Volume 12: 1882, David E. Schultz and S. T. Joshi, eds. (Seattle: Sarnath Press, 2023)
- Collected Essays and Journalism: Volume 13: 1883, David E. Schultz and S. T. Joshi, eds. (Seattle: Sarnath Press, 2023)
- Collected Essays and Journalism: Volume 14: 1883–1884, David E. Schultz and S. T. Joshi, eds. (Seattle: Sarnath Press, 2023)
- Collected Essays and Journalism: Volume 15: 1884–1885, David E. Schultz and S. T. Joshi, eds. (Seattle: Sarnath Press, 2023)
- Collected Essays and Journalism: Volume 16: 1885, David E. Schultz and S. T. Joshi, eds. (Seattle: Sarnath Press, 2023)
- Collected Essays and Journalism: Volume 17: 1886, David E. Schultz and S. T. Joshi, eds. (Seattle: Sarnath Press, 2023)

Letters

- Containing Four Ambrose Bierce Letters (New York: Charles Romm, 1921)
- The Letters of Ambrose Bierce, Bertha Clark Pope [and George Sterling, uncredited], eds. (San Francisco: Book Club of California, 1922)
- Twenty-one Letters of Ambrose Bierce, Samuel Loveman, ed. (Cleveland: George Kirk, 1922)
- A Letter and a Likeness (n.p.: Harvey Taylor, [1930?])
- Battlefields and Ghosts (Palo Alto: Harvest Press, 1931)
- Ambrose Bierce: "My Dear Rearden": a Letter. (Berkeley: Bancroft Library Press, 1997)
- A Much Misunderstood Man: Selected Letters of Ambrose Bierce, S. T. Joshi and David E. Schultz, eds. (Columbus: Ohio State University, 2003)
- My Dear Mac: Three Letters (Berkeley: Bancroft Library Press, 2006)

=== Short stories ===
Ambrose Bierce was a prolific writer of short fiction. He wrote 249 short stories, 846 fables, and more than 300 humorous Little Johnny stories. The following list provides links to more information about notable stories by Bierce.

War stories

- Killed at Resaca (1887)
- One of the Missing (1888)
- A Tough Tussle (1888)
- A Horseman in the Sky (1889)
- An Occurrence at Owl Creek Bridge (1890)

Supernatural stories

- A Psychological Shipwreck (1879)
- An Inhabitant of Carcosa (1886)
- An Unfinished Race (1888)
- One of Twins (1888)
- The Spook House (1889)
- The Man and the Snake (1890)
- The Realm of the Unreal (1890)
- The Middle Toe of the Right Foot (1890)
- The Boarded Window (1891)
- The Death of Halpin Frayser (1891)
- The Secret of Macarger's Gulch (1891)
- John Bartine's Watch (1893)
- The Eyes of the Panther (1897)
- The Moonlit Road (1907)
- Beyond the Wall (1907)

Science fiction

- The Damned Thing (1893)
- Moxon's Master (1899)

== Multilingual editions ==
- Grashopper and ant / Grille und Ameise / Cigarra y Hormiga. Calambac Publishing House, Germany 2013, trilingual edition: English/German/Spanish, ISBN 978-3-943117-76-9.
- Man and goose / Mann und Gans / Hombre y Oca. Calambac Publishing House, Germany 2013, trilingual edition: English/German/Spanish, ISBN 978-3-943117-78-3.

== See also ==
- List of horror fiction authors
- List of people who disappeared mysteriously: 1910–1990
- List of authors in war
- List of American print journalists
- List of short-story authors
- List of satirists and satires
- Fable
- The Devil's Dictionary
- Tales of Soldiers and Civilians
- "An Occurrence at Owl Creek Bridge"
- "A Wine of Wizardry"

== Bibliography ==
- Bleiler, Everett (1948). The Checklist of Fantastic Literature. Chicago: Shasta Publishers. pp. 32, 147.
- Cozzens, Peter. 1996. "The Tormenting Flame: What Ambrose Bierce Saw in a Fire-Swept Thicket at Shiloh Haunted Him for the rest of his Life." Civil War Times Illustrated. April 1996. Volume XXXV (1). pp. 44–54.
- De Castro, Adolphe (1929). Portrait of Ambrose Bierce (New York and London: Century).
- Drabelle, Dennis. 2025 The Great American Railroad War: How Ambrose Bierce and Frank Norris Took on the Notorious Central Pacific Railroad (Macmillan, 2025) .online
- Eckhardt, Jason. "Across the Borderlands of Conjecture with Mr Bierce." Studies in Weird Fiction 4 (Fall 1988), 26–31.
- Fatout, Paul. Ambrose Bierce: The Devil's Lexicographer. Norman: University of Oklahoma Press, 1951.
- Floyd, E Randall (1999). The Good, the Bad, and the Mad: Some Weird People in American History. New York: Barnes & Noble. ISBN 978-0-7607-6600-2.
- Grenander, M.E. Ambrose Bierce. NY: Twayne Publishers, 1971.
- McWilliams, Carey (1929; reprinted 1967). Ambrose Bierce: A Biography, Archon Books.
- Morris, Roy (1999) [1995]. Ambrose Bierce: alone in bad company. US: Oxford University Press. ISBN 978-0-19-512628-0.
- Nickell, Joseph 'Joe' (1992). Ambrose Bierce Is Missing and Other Historical Mysteries. University Press of Kentucky. ISBN 978-0813117669.
- O'Connor, Richard (1967). Ambrose Bierce: a Biography, with illustrations, Boston, Little, Brown and Company.

== Primary sources ==
- Bierce, Ambrose. (2010) The Collected Works of Ambrose Bierce (3 vol 1910) online
- Bierce, Ambrose. The Civil War Short Stories of Ambrose Bierce (U of Nebraska Press, 1988). online
- Bierce, Ambrose (2003). Joshi, ST; Shultz, David E (eds.). A Much Misunderstood Man: Selected Letters of Ambrose Bierce. Ohio State University Press.
- Bierce, Ambrose. The complete short stories of Ambrose Bierce (1970; reprint U of Nebraska Press, 1984). online
- The Ambrose Bierce Papers, 1872–1913 (2 linear ft.) and Foster family collection of Ambrose Bierce materials (3 linear feet) are housed in the Department of Special Collections and University Archives at Stanford University Libraries.
- The Ambrose Bierce Papers, ca. 1894–1913 and the Collection of Ambrose Bierce Papers, 1875–1925, bulk 1890–1913 are housed at The Bancroft Library.
