= An Occurrence at Owl Creek Bridge =

1890 short story by Ambrose Bierce

- Short story by Ambrose Bierce
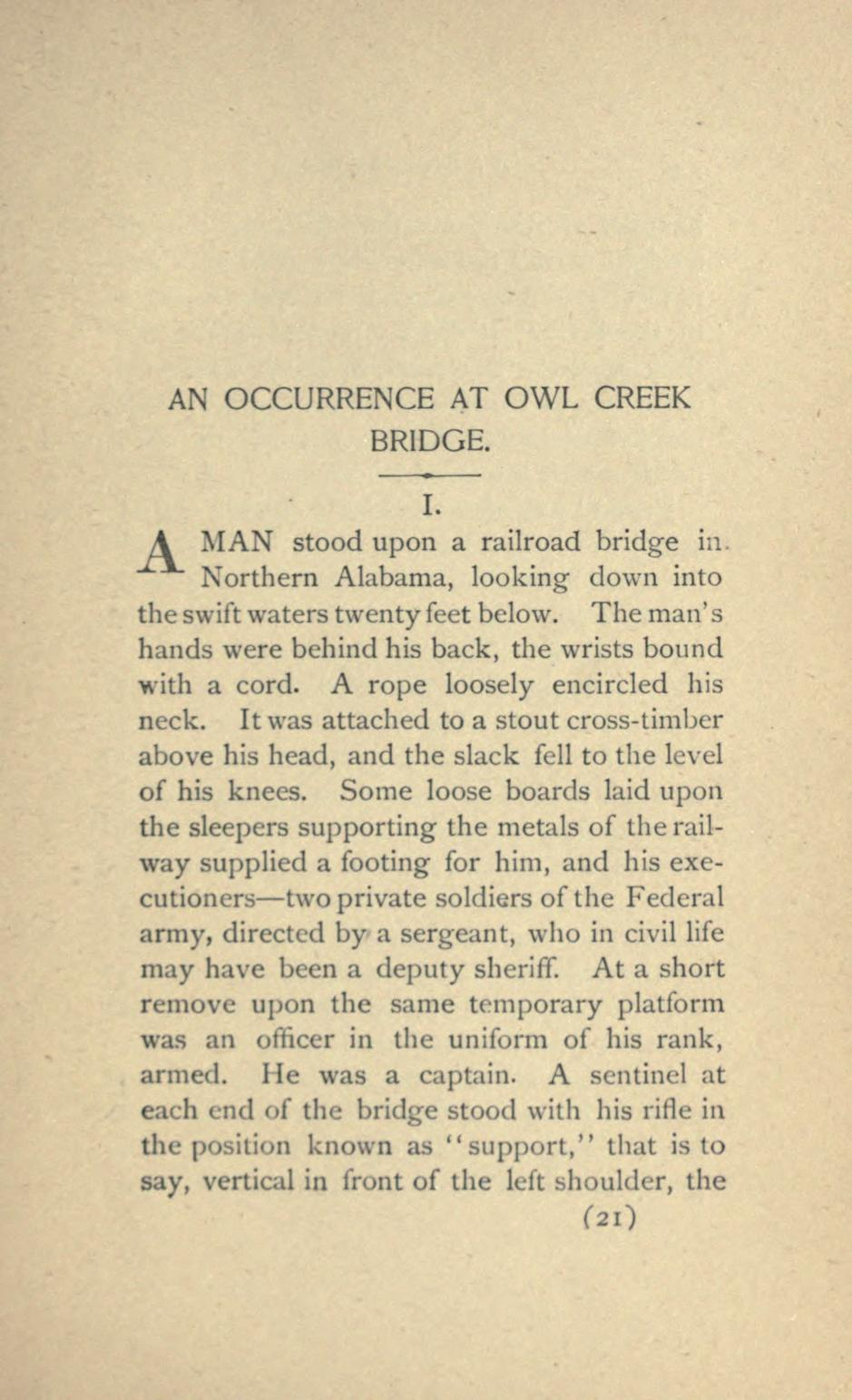
- Country: United States
- Language: English
- Genres: Short story
- First publisher: San Francisco Examiner, July 13, 1890
- Also published in: Tales of Soldiers and Civilians (1891)
- Online: Available at the Internet Archive

Publication

"An Occurrence at Owl Creek Bridge" is an 1890 short story by American writer and American Civil War veteran Ambrose Bierce, described as "one of the most famous and frequently anthologized stories in American literature". It was originally published by the San Francisco Examiner on July 13, 1890, and was first collected in Bierce's book Tales of Soldiers and Civilians (1891). Bierce's abandonment of strict linear narration in favor of the internal mind of the protagonist is an early example of the stream-of-consciousness narrative mode, also called the liminal, distended time flash forward.

== Plot ==
Peyton Farquhar, a wealthy civilian planter and slave owner, is being prepared for execution by hanging from an Alabama railroad bridge during the American Civil War. Six military men and a company of infantrymen are present, guarding the bridge and carrying out the sentence. Farquhar thinks of his wife and children and is then distracted by a noise that sounds like an unbearably loud clanging, but is actually the ticking of his watch. He considers the possibility of jumping off the bridge and swimming to safety if he can free his tied hands, but the soldiers drop him from the bridge before he can act on the idea.

In a flashback, Farquhar and his wife are relaxing at home one evening when a soldier dressed in Confederate gray rides up to the gate. Farquhar, a supporter of the Confederacy, learns from him that Union troops have seized the Owl Creek railroad bridge and repaired it. The soldier suggests that Farquhar might be able to burn the bridge down if he can slip past its guards. He then leaves, but doubles back after nightfall to return north the way he came. The soldier is actually a disguised Union scout who has lured Farquhar into a trap, as any civilian caught interfering with the railroads will be hanged.

The rope breaks, and Farquhar falls into the creek. He frees his hands, pulls the noose away and rises to the surface to begin his escape. His senses now greatly sharpened, he dives and swims downstream to avoid rifle and cannon fire. Once he is out of range, he leaves the creek to begin the journey to his home, thirty miles (48 kilometers) away. Farquhar walks all day through a seemingly endless forest; that night he begins to hallucinate, seeing strange constellations and hearing whispered voices in an unknown language. He travels on, urged by the thought of his wife and children despite the pains caused by his ordeal. The next morning, after having apparently fallen asleep while walking, he finds himself at the gate of his plantation. He rushes to embrace his wife, but before he can do so he feels a heavy blow upon the back of his neck. There is a loud noise and a flash of white and "then all is darkness and silence!"

Farquhar's dead body hangs from the Owl Creek bridge. He never escaped at all; he imagined his escape and journey home during the time between being dropped and the noose breaking his neck.

== Publication and reception ==
"An Occurrence at Owl Creek Bridge" was first published in the July 13, 1890, issue of the San Francisco Examiner, and later included in Bierce's short fiction anthology Tales of Soldiers and Civilians (1891).

Editors of a modern compilation described the story as "one of the most famous and frequently anthologized stories in American literature". Kurt Vonnegut wrote in 2005: "I consider anybody a twerp who hasn't read the greatest American short story, which is '[An] Occurrence at Owl Creek Bridge,' by Ambrose Bierce. It isn't remotely political. It is a flawless example of American genius, like 'Sophisticated Lady' by Duke Ellington or the Franklin stove."

== Analysis ==
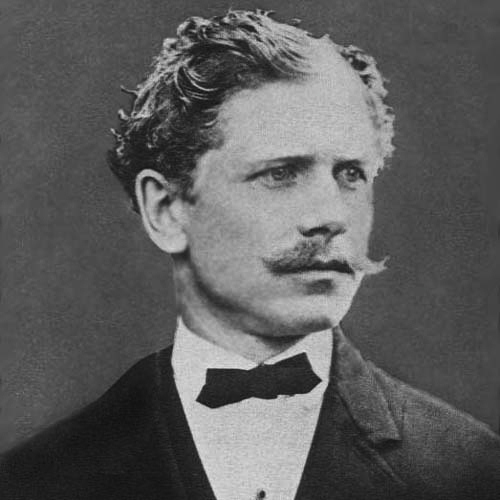
Ambrose Bierce, c. 1866

The real Owl Creek Bridge is in Tennessee. Bierce likely changed the setting to northern Alabama because the actual bridge did not have a railroad near it at the time of the story.

The story explores the concept of "dying with dignity". It shows the reader that the perception of "dignity" provides no mitigation for the deaths that occur in warfare. It further demonstrates psychological escape right before death. Farquhar experiences an intense delusion to distract him from his inevitable death. The moment of horror that the reader experiences at the end of the piece reflects the distortion of reality that Farquhar encounters.

== Influence ==
The plot device of a long period of subjective time passing in an instant, such as the imagined experiences of Farquhar while falling, has been explored by several authors. An early literary antecedent appears in the Tang dynasty tale The Governor of Nanke, by Li Gongzuo. Another medieval antecedent is Don Juan Manuel's Tales of Count Lucanor, Chapter XII (c. 1335), "Of that which happened to a Dean of Santiago, with Don Illan, the Magician, who lived at Toledo," in which a life happens in an instant. Charles Dickens's essay "A Visit to Newgate", wherein a man dreams he has escaped his death sentence, has been speculated as a possible source for the story. Bierce's story, in turn, may have influenced "The Snows of Kilimanjaro" by Ernest Hemingway and Pincher Martin by William Golding.

Bierce's story highlighted the idea of subjective time passing at the moment of death and popularized the fictional device of false narrative continuation, which has been in wide circulation ever since then. Notable examples of this technique from the early-to-mid-20th century include H. G. Wells's "The Door in the Wall" (1906) and "The Beautiful Suit" (1909), Vladimir Nabokov's "Details of a Sunset" (1924) and "The Aurelian" (1930), Jorge Luis Borges's "The Secret Miracle" (1944) and "The South" (1949), William Golding's Pincher Martin (1956), Paul Auster's Lulu on the Bridge (1998), Claude Chabrol's Alice or The Last Escapade (1977), Terry Gilliam's Brazil (1985) as well as Julio Cortázar's "The Island at Midday" and Leo Perutz's "From Nine to Nine". Alexander Lernet-Holenia's novella Der Baron Bagge (1936) shares many similarities with Bierce's story, including the setting in the midst of a war and the bridge as a symbol for the moment of passage from life to death.

David Lynch's films Lost Highway (1997) and Mulholland Drive (2001) have been compared to "An Occurrence at Owl Creek Bridge", although they also have been interpreted as "Möbius strip" storylines. A particularly strong inspiration for the 1990 film Jacob's Ladder, for both Bruce Joel Rubin and Adrian Lyne, was Robert Enrico's 1962 film adaptation An Occurrence at Owl Creek Bridge, one of Lyne's favorite movies. Tobias Wolff's short story "Bullet in the Brain" (1995) reveals the protagonist's past through relating what he remembers—and does not—in the millisecond after he is fatally shot. John Shirley's 1999 short story "Occurrence at Owl Street Ridge" about a depressed housewife is modeled after Bierce's story and Bierce plays a minor role in it.

Critics have noted a similar final act in Terry Gilliam's 1985 film Brazil. In the 2005 film Stay, the entire story takes place in a character's mind after a tragic accident. As in Bierce's story, in the fourth-season Boardwalk Empire episode "Farewell Daddy Blues" (2013), Richard Harrow hallucinates a long journey home to his family before his death is revealed. In an interview with Afterbuzz, Teen Wolf writer and creator Jeff Davis said that the final sequence of the third-season finale (2014) was inspired by "An Occurrence at Owl Creek Bridge."

A third-series episode of the British TV show Black Mirror followed a similar plot. In the episode "Playtest", Cooper tests a revolutionary video game that causes him to confuse the game with reality. Similar to Bierce's protagonist, it is revealed at the end that the entire sequence of events has taken place in the short span of his death. In Scrubs, the first-episode "My Occurrence " has a similar plot structure, where the main character J.D. believes that a clerical mistake was made with his patient Ben. J.D. spends the entire episode trying to get it rectified, only to realize at the end that this was all a fantasy to avoid the reality that Ben had been diagnosed with leukemia. The episode's title is also a reference to the story. The Inside No. 9 episode "The 12 Days of Christine" also has a very similar plot, with Christine reliving memories of her life without realizing, she is dying from a car crash.

The 2020 film Ghosts of War is about a group of soldiers who find themselves in a time loop. In one scene, one of the main characters briefly tells his fellow soldiers about An Occurrence at Owl Creek Bridge, implying that they may be going through a similar situation. It is later revealed that they are in fact part of an experiment and the entire situation is taking place in their minds. The broken hangman's knot and lost traveler cliché figure into the plot for the 1999 movie From Dusk Till Dawn 3: The Hangman's Daughter in which Ambrose Bierce is a character.

The story has also influenced music. For example, the fourteenth track on Bressa Creeting Cake's self-titled 1997 album is entitled "Peyton Farquhar". The heavy metal band Deceased retold the tale in the song "The Hanging Soldier" on its 2000 album Supernatural Addiction. Adam Young has said that the story was the inspiration for the name of his 2007 electronica musical project, Owl City. The Doobie Brothers song "I Cheat The Hangman" was inspired by the story according its composer, Patrick Simmons. The song Mendokusai on Tellison's 2015 album Hope Fading Nightly features the refrain "We are all broken necked, swinging from the timbers of Owl Creek Bridge."

== Adaptations ==
Several adaptations of "An Occurrence at Owl Creek Bridge" have been produced.

=== Movies, television and videos ===
The 1929 film The Bridge

- The Spy (also released as The Bridge) is a silent movie adaptation of the story, directed in 1929 by Charles Vidor.
- A TV version of the story starring British actor Ronald Howard as Peyton Farquhar and James Coburn as the Union sergeant was broadcast in 1959 during the fifth season of the Alfred Hitchcock Presents television anthology series. At the end of the story after Farquhar has been hanged, the Union sergeant orders the corporal to cut Peyton down.
- La rivière du hibou ("The Owl River", known in English as An Occurrence at Owl Creek Bridge), a French version directed by Robert Enrico and produced by Marcel Ichac and Paul de Roubaix, was released in 1963. Enrico's film won Best Short Subject at the 1962 Cannes Film Festival, and the 1963 Academy Award for Live Action Short Film. In 1964 La rivière du hibou aired on American television as an episode of the anthology series The Twilight Zone, but was edited to fit running-time constraints.
- In 2006, the DVD Ambrose Bierce: Civil War Stories was released, which contains adaptations of three of Ambrose Bierce's short stories, among them "An Occurrence at Owl Creek Bridge" directed by Brian James Egan. The DVD also contains an extended version of the story with more background and detail than the one included in the trilogy.
- Owl Creek Bridge, a 2008 short film by director John Giwa-Amu, won the BAFTA Cymru Award for best short. The story was adapted to follow the last days of Khalid, a young boy who is caught by a gang of racist youths.
- "An Incident at Owl Creek" is a sixth-season episode of the TV series American Dad!.
- The 2010 Babybird music video "Unloveable", directed by Johnny Depp, retells the Owl Creek Bridge story.
- The 2011 Grouplove music video "Colours" also retells the Owl Creek Bridge story.
- A 2013 short film, The Exit Room, starring Christopher Abbott as a journalist in a war-torn 2021 United States, is based on the story.
- In the Jon Bon Jovi music video for the 1990 song "Dyin' Ain't Much Of A Livin'," the Owl Creek Bridge story is used as the theme.

=== Radio ===
- In 1936, the radio series The Columbia Workshop broadcast an adaptation of "An Occurrence at Owl Creek Bridge".
- William N. Robson's first script adaptation was broadcast on Escape December 10, 1947, starring Harry Bartell as Peyton Farquhar.
- Suspense broadcast three different versions, all with slightly different scripts by William N. Robson:
  - December 9, 1956, starring Victor Jory as Farquhar;
  - December 15, 1957, starring Joseph Cotten as Farquhar;
  - July 9, 1959, starring Vincent Price as Farquhar.
- CBS Radio Mystery Theater broadcast an adaptation by Sam Dann on June 4, 1974 (repeated on August 24, 1974 and September 15, 1979) starring William Prince.
- Winifred Phillips narrated and composed original music for an abridged version of the story for the Tales by American Masters radio series, produced by Winnie Waldron on May 29, 2001.
- The Twilight Zone Radio Dramas (2002) broadcast an adaptation of the story by M. J. Eliot directed by JoBe Cerny, starring Christian Stolte as Farquhar and featuring Stacy Keach as the narrator.

=== Other ===
- Issue #23 of the comics magazine Eerie, published in September 1969 by Warren Publishing, contained an adaptation of the story.
- The Scottish composer Thea Musgrave composed a one-act radio opera, An Occurrence at Owl Creek Bridge, which was broadcast by BBC Radio 3 in 1982. It was performed by the baritone Jake Gardner and the London Sinfonietta, conducted by the composer, with spoken roles taken by Ed Bishop, Gayle Hunnicutt, and David Healy. This broadcast was released by NMC Recordings in 2011.
