= Never Hungover Again =

Studio album by Joyce Manor
- Released: July 22, 2014
- Genres: Punk rock; pop-punk; indie rock; emo
- Length: 19:00
- Label: Epitaph
- Producer: Joe Reinhart

Joyce Manor chronology
| Of All Things I Will Soon Grow Tired (2012) | Never Hungover Again (2014) | Cody (2016) |

Singles from Never Hungover Again
- 1. "Catalina Fight Song" Released: May 15, 2014; 2. "Schley" Released: June 17, 2014

Never Hungover Again is the third studio album by American rock band Joyce Manor, released on July 22, 2014, through Epitaph Records. Never Hungover Again explores topics like love and summertime. It contains both bracingly fast and mid-tempo punk songs, recorded live across two weeks at a Hollywood studio with producer Joe Reinhart. The album's run time clocks in at only nineteen minutes long. The band aimed for brevity, and most of the songs on the album are under two minutes.

Never Hungover Again became the band's first album to reach the Billboard 200, where it peaked at 106. Music critics embraced the album, cementing the band's place as one of the top pop-punk bands of the 2010s; they were credited with spearheading a revival of emo music alongside acts like Title Fight and Tigers Jaw. The band played shows in support of the album with Brand New, as well as their first-ever headlining slots alongside Toys That Kill, Mitski, and Modern Baseball.

== Background ==
After diving deeper into their esoteric influences on the eccentric sophomore release Of All Things I Will Soon Grow Tired (2012), Joyce Manor opted to take a back-to-basics approach with Never Hungover Again. Frontman Barry Johnson admitted that he developed a complex about being in a pop-punk band and had intentionally tried to move beyond those trappings on Of All Things.

== Recording and production ==
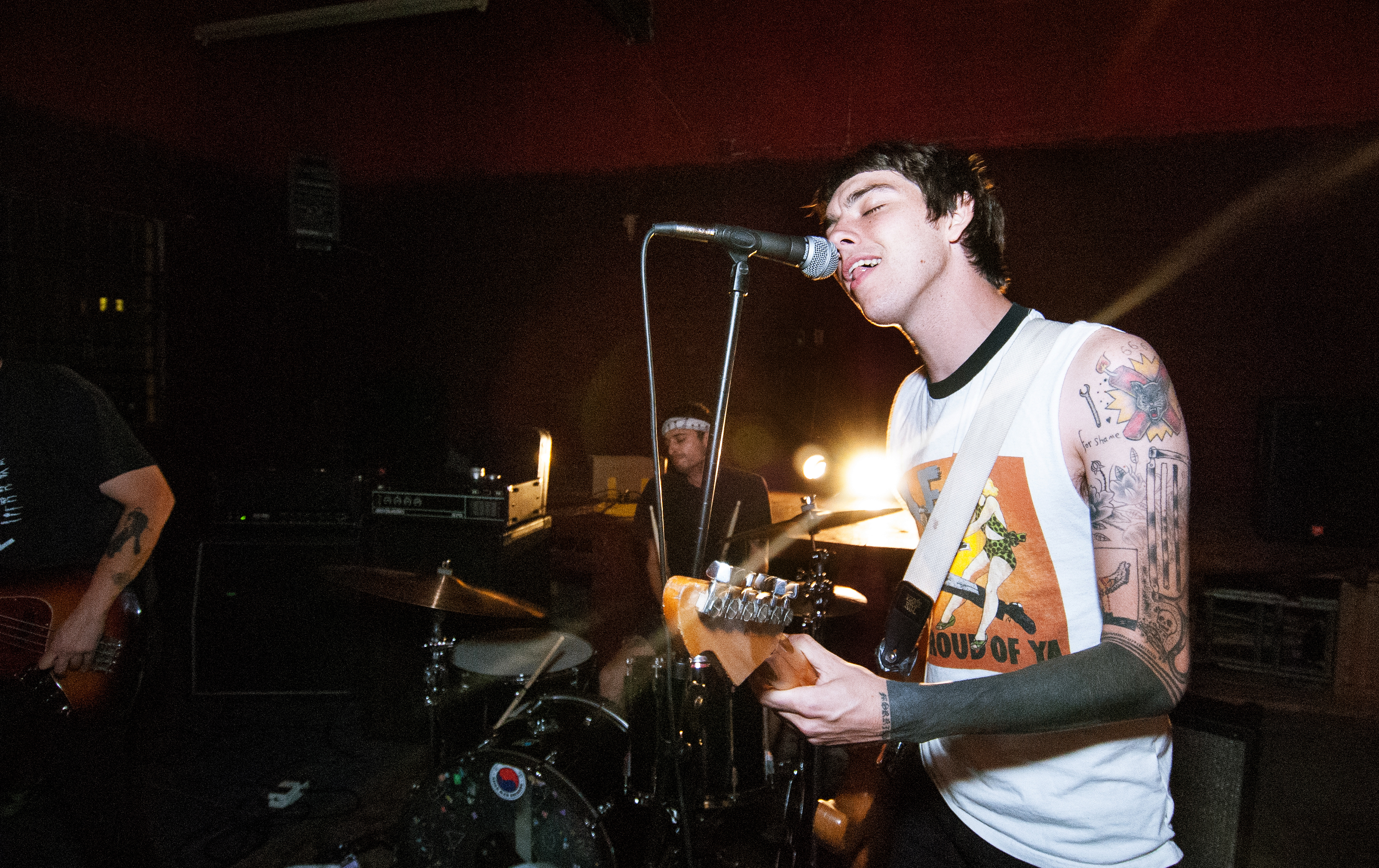
Joyce Manor performing in 2012.

The band first made an attempt at recording the album in February 2013 in Philadelphia with Joe Reinhart of Algernon Cadwallader. The quartet tracked eight songs but were not pleased with the results. Many of the songs had been written over a period of years, but the band resumed writing, aiming for a higher quality output on the album after touring songs for years from earlier efforts they felt tired of. Specifically, the band felt that they needed stronger hooks for the songs.

Never Hungover Again marked a moment where the interplay between frontman Barry Johnson and guitarist Chase Knobbe began to take shape. In an interview, Johnson explained that Knobbe was dating a person in Santa Cruz who was in college; "While she was in school all day, he would just smoke weed and play guitar. And he got way better at guitar by doing that," he said. Throughout 2013, the band spent time re-working songs ("End of the Summer", "Heated Swimming Pool"), and developing new ones ("Falling in Love Again", "The Jerk"). The band found the new material refreshing: "Like once we wrote [those two], it felt more rich and like something different that we hadn’t done yet," Johnson said. "It was during this batch of songwriting that I noticed a pretty big jump in the quality of the songs we were writing and Chase and I really started spending a lot of time on the vocals and guitar parts and how they interact with each other," he remembered.

They asked Reinhart to revisit the project with them later in the year, and the final album was recorded over two weeks in November 2013 at the Lair in Hollywood, an all-analog facility. The band chose the Lair due to its Neve 80s series mixing console and Studer 2” tape machine. The studio was where Rivers Cuomo of Weezer recorded his demos, and Walcher played the album on Cuomo's drum kit. It was the first time the band had used a click track to record to, which was difficult for much of the band besides Ebert; "Once we got the hang of it we loved how it sounded and felt," Johnson said. Much of the album was recorded live and characterized by drunkenness: "For a lot of it, we were pretty wasted. Four of the takes we got in a row, while we were very drunk and high." The band wanted to add more harmonies to songs but ran out of time; "We barely had enough time to finish basic tracking," Johnson confessed. Reinhart recalled with fondness the atmosphere: "The band crashed on couches and ate Trader Joe's dumpster food while we worked. It was an exciting time to be DIY kids." "Christmas Card" was tracked slightly faster than the band intended so the band slowed down the take by adjusting the tape speed. Johnson recalled: "I knew the Beatles messed with tape speed on Revolver and Rubber Soul and I wanted to be like the Beatles." There is an error present on the final album, with the opening note of "Christmas Card" bearing a technical issue with the tape machine. The band shelved one track from the album, "Secret Sisters", but it resurfaced on 2022's 40 oz. to Fresno, where the band felt it fit better.

== Composition ==
The often jangly guitar work on Hungover was frequently likened to the Smiths' Johnny Marr; the band also noted Guided by Voices as an influence. Entertainment Weekly's Miles Raymer observed that "Never Hungover Again combines the earnestly awkward adolescent squawk of emo foundation-layers Cap'n Jazz with Cali pop-punk’s buzzsaw hooks." "Heart Tattoo" was the band's attempt at writing a Blink-182 song; Matt Ebert's backing vocals on the song's last chorus are a tribute to Tom DeLonge.

Johnston took an oblique approach to his lyricism, allowing songs to develop line-by-line. He would write a lyric, and build upon them gradually with no set theme in mind. In between writing, the band stayed on the road, touring with Algernon Cadwallader, which Johnson felt made an impact on their songwriting.

== Release and artwork ==
After recording the album, the band signed to fabled punk imprint Epitaph Records, at the behest of label founder Brett Gurewitz. Gurewitz was drawn to Johnson's economic style of lyrics. Johnson later conceded that starting the album with "In the Army Now", which was also its original title, was a mistaken choice. Gurewitz was wary of the title and successfully lobbied the band to alter its original track sequencing, with the band later seeing his viewpoint: they derided the order as "terrible" in a 2020 Twitter post. Ian Cohen later observed that the signing of Joyce Manor led a 2010s renaissance for the label: "Never Hungover Again immediately revitalized Epitaph, starting a run of scene-defining records from Pianos Become the Teeth, Touché Amoré, the World Is a Beautiful Place & I Am No Longer Afraid to Die, and the Sidekicks."

As the album prepared to enter mixing, Johnson grew worried that the sessions were unsalvageable. "I'm old, I'm washed up and nobody really likes what I'm doing," he told himself. Epitaph financed the album's mixing process, which was conducted by Tony Hoffer, known for his work with M83 and Phoenix. Gurewitz viewed the choice as right in the band's purview: "He was a guy who'd done pop records, but really cool indie, Pitchfork kind of records," Gurewitz explains. 'So I thought, OK, that's the perfect matrix for Joyce Manor.'" Hoffer had a conversation with Johnson about the goals for mixing the album, and he stressed that he preferred the sound of synthesizers to guitars, offering "Friday I'm in Love" as a touchpoint.

The album cover features a backstage photograph taken in 2012 by photographer Ariel LeBeau, depicting guitarist Matt Ebert drunkenly embracing Frances Quinlan of Hop Along. "It looks like two people partying, but there’s nothing dangerous or sexy about it," Ebert joked. Ebert initially expressed discomfort with being prominently featured on the cover, citing a reluctance to be the center of attention, though he later came to appreciate the image. Never Hungover Again debuted as a stream on NPR on July 14, 2014. Despite high hopes at Epitaph, it was not a major seller for the label and did not make an immediate impact, but it gradually became a cult classic over the years.

== Critical reception ==
Professional ratings
Aggregate scores
| Source | Rating |
|---|---|
| AnyDecentMusic? | 7.4/10 |
| Metacritic | 82/100 |
Review scores
| Source | Rating |
| AllMusic | 4.5/5 stars |
| Alternative Press | 4/5 stars |
| The A.V. Club | A− |
| Consequence of Sound | C+ |
| DIY | 4/5 stars |
| Exclaim! | 8/10 |
| Kerrang! | 4/5 |
| NME | 7/10 |
| Pitchfork | 7.8/10 |
| Wondering Sound | 4/5 stars |

Upon its release, Never Hungover Again received positive reviews from music critics. At Metacritic, which assigns a normalized rating out of 100 to reviews from critics, the album received an average score of 82, which indicates "universal acclaim", based on 13 reviews. The A.V. Club critic David Anthony wrote that the album "isn’t a complete overhaul of the band’s sound, but with all the gentle twists on those charms, it ends up serving as a re-introduction." AllMusic's Tim Sendra stated: "Joyce Manor make 20 minutes feel way more epic than the running time might promise, and Never Hungover Again ends up as the kind of record that feels like an instant classic." Ian Cohen of Pitchfork thought: "Once you stop trying to label what should be a hook and focus on what is, the ingenuity of each song’s design and the ear-turning nature of every maneuver speaks to Never Hungover Again's inexhaustible quality, the kind of album you can play three times in a row without any part wearing out its welcome."

NPR's Lars Gotrich viewed it a "confident, focused record," while PopMatters' Tanner Smith found "it has almost peerless consistency in quality [...] The band’s concision is evidenced not only in each song’s respective brevity, but through the rigid structures and arrangements, balancing mathematical control and cathartic release." Maura Johnson from The Boston Globe observed "The resentful "In the Army Now" and determined "Heart Tattoo" clip along thanks to sprightly, melodic bass lines from Matt Ebert and Kurt Walcher's clockwork drumming." Stereogum's Danielle Chelosky called it their best album, opining: "Never Hungover Again finds the band at their most emotive and compelling — an incisive and intoxicating snapshot of what it means to be alive."

For its tenth anniversary, the album received several retrospective pieces. Brian Stout of PopMatters dubbed it "one of the key punk records of the 2010s", while Grace Robins-Somerville from Paste considered it the most "quintessential" release by the band. For Stereogum, Danielle Chelosky opined "Never Hungover Again masterfully achieves what most artists spend their lives trying to accomplish: It captures intense feeling and passes it on to its listener."

=== Rankings ===
Select rankings for Never Hungover Again
| Publication | List | Year | Rank | Ref. |
|---|---|---|---|---|
| Spin | 50 Best Albums of 2014 | 2014 | 32 | |
| AllMusic | Best Albums of 2014 | 2014 | - | |
| Spin | 30 Best Emo Revival Albums, Ranked | 2017 | 5 | |
| Rolling Stone | The 50 Greatest Pop-Punk Albums | 2017 | 47 | |
| Pitchfork | The 200 Best Albums of the 2010s | 2019 | 90 | |
| Consequence | The Top 15 Emo Albums of the Last 15 Years | 2022 | 2 | |

== Track listing ==
All tracks are written by Joyce Manor.

| No. | Title | Length |
|---|---|---|
| 1. | "Christmas Card" | 2:05 |
| 2. | "Falling in Love Again" | 2:28 |
| 3. | "End of the Summer" | 1:49 |
| 4. | "Victoria" | 1:39 |
| 5. | "Schley" | 2:07 |
| 6. | "Heart Tattoo" | 1:50 |
| 7. | "The Jerk" | 1:46 |
| 8. | "In the Army Now" | 2:21 |
| 9. | "Catalina Fight Song" | 1:05 |
| 10. | "Heated Swimming Pool" | 1:50 |
| Total length: | | 19:00 |

== Personnel ==
Joyce Manor

- Barry Johnson - vocals, guitar
- Matt Ebert - bass, vocals
- Chase Knobbe - guitar
- Kurt Walcher - drums

Other personnel

- Joe Reinhart - production, engineering
- Scott Arnold - design and layout
- Howie Weinberg - mastering
- Tony Hoffer - mixing
- Ariel LeBeau - photography, backing vocals
- Evan Bernard - assistant production, assistant engineering
- Alex Estrada - production (vocals)
- Brett Gurewitz - production (vocals)
- Terence Calacsan - keyboards
- Peter Helms - backing vocals

== Chart positions ==
| Chart (2014) | Peak position |
|---|---|
| US Billboard 200 | 106 |
| US Billboard Alternative Albums | 24 |
| US Billboard Heatseekers | 1 |
| US Billboard Independent Albums | 23 |
| US Billboard Top Rock Albums | 23 |
| US Billboard Tastemaker Albums | 17 |
