= Powerful Man =

Song by Hop Along

from the album Painted Shut
- Released: May 4, 2015
- Genre: Indie rock
- Length: 3:25
- Label: Saddle Creek Records
- Composer: Hop Along
- Lyricist: Frances Quinlan
- Producers: Hop Along and John Agnello

"Powerful Man" is a song by American indie rock band Hop Along, appearing as the seventh track on their third studio album Painted Shut. It was the first single released from the album.

== Background and lyrics ==
The song's lyrics were written by Hop Along frontperson Frances Quinlan and recount a time they witnessed an act of child abuse at age 18, in which an adult man struck his child. They told New York-based music magazine The Fader: "I was 18 and immediately afraid of this man; I didn’t confront him. I can’t imagine what it must be like for a little boy, watching someone walk away as his father punches him about the head. I witnessed a frightening part of myself that day: in a time of crisis I was not there for a child, I froze up." WPXN stated that the song's lyrics were blunt, saying "there is nothing to uncover beneath the barreling bassline, brisk guitar and barreling drums, it’s all there in the open."

Quinlan told The Line of Best Fit: "I stared at them, I had never seen an adult hit a child like that. The little boy looked at me and his father said, “Don’t look at her, she’s not gonna help you.” He was completely unaffected, unthreatened by our presence. There was nobody else on the street. We walked on silently. It’s the most horrible thing I’ve ever done. Sometimes you see a part of yourself and you’re just not ready to know what kind of person you are when you get scared."

== Composition and style ==
Musically, Stereogum described the track as "almost funky". According to Quinlan, band had originally attempted to play the song "slow and brooding and really heavy," but could not make it work in a way that they found satisfactory. They said to pop culture website Grantland: "There was something about it that felt like we weren’t very present playing that one. We weren’t engaged playing it that way. We come from such different backgrounds musically that some of our best work comes out of us figuring the thing out all together, because everybody has a different idea. We’ll clash a lot, but it’s when we end up digging into it that things take an interesting turn."

Quinlan also said in an interview with Vice "if someone talked about 'Powerful Man' and just called it catchy, that would bum [them] out. Because that doesn’t discuss the content at all." Hop Along drummer Mark Quinlan followed up this statement asking the interviewer, "why are people calling us 'pop-punk?' Tell me why!"

== Reception ==
New Noise Magazine called the track a "hauntingly powerful tale."
