= Horseshoe Crabs =

Song by Hop Along

from the album Painted Shut
- Genre: Indie rock, country, sentimental ballad
- Lyricist: Frances Quinlan

"Horseshoe Crabs" is a song by American indie rock band Hop Along. It appears as the third track on their third album Painted Shut. Pitchfork cited the track as the best on the album. Pennsylvania-based magazine Philadelphia recommended the track as a suitable introduction for listeners unfamiliar with the band.

The song is noted for its dark and "haunting" feel. WXPN stated that the song's melody "perfectly accompanies the lyrics of loss illustrated through the lens of childhood memories about summertime adventures." Pitchfork described the song as stylistically a "country-ish ballad".

== Background and lyrics ==
The song's lyrics were inspired by the life and tragic experiences of American folk musician Jackson C. Frank. This particular musician lost several classmates during an explosion at an elementary school he attended, which left him with burns on his body. Later in life, he lost vision in one of his eyes after being inadvertently shot while resting on a park bench. The musician was also schizophrenic and spent part of his life homeless and in psychiatric hospitals. He ultimately abandoned music after moving back in with his parents. Lyricist Frances Quinlan recalled learning about the musician's life: "I just heard one of his songs on a Pandora station, and it was a really moving piece called 'Tumble in the Wind'. I looked into his story, and it was one of the saddest things I read in a while."
