= I Could Do Whatever I Wanted, If I Wanted =

Studio album by Snowing
- Released: December 4, 2010
- Recorded: 2010
- Genres: Emo; post-hardcore; indie rock; math rock
- Label: Self-released
- Producer: Joe Reinhart

I Could Do Whatever I Wanted, If I Wanted is the first and only full-length album by American emo band Snowing. Although commercially overlooked upon its release, the album is considered a modern landmark in the emo genre, and has been featured on several "best of" lists.

== Background and recording ==
Joe Reinhart of Algernon Cadwallader (and later Hop Along) produced the album. The album's instruments were tracked individually, and the band claims that there were likely never more than three members of the band in the room at the same time. Upon hearing other members' tracks for the first time, some members of the band claim they recall thinking things such as "they did what?" or "what the fuck? That's the part he played..?"

The album was mixed using iPod nano earbuds.

== Release and promotion ==
Although the album had no official release, the band believes the album was likely released on December 4, 2010. The band released the album simply via Mediafire link, after having previously attempting to release music on their own website, which crashed within hours.

== Music and lyrics ==
I Could Do Whatever I Wanted's sound is considered to be less abrasive than its predecessor. Consequence said the album "is the type of album to conjure nostalgia for times in your life you thought you'd never want to endure again". The album contains elements of math rock. Snowing bassist/vocalist John Galm's vocal melodies have been called "atonal." The staff of Spin Magazine said "the Lehigh Valley, PA foursome push beyond emo’s characteristic melancholy and opt for full-on apathy—they're not flaccid, but completely without desire. [...] I Could isn’t easy to listen to and that peculiar brashness is intentional."

Lyrical themes explored on the album include alcohol intoxication, death, and depression.

== Track listing ==
No.	Title	Length
1.	"I Think We're in Minsk"	2:05
2.	"Mark Z. Danielewski"	2:09
3.	"Malk It"	2:36
4.	"Why Am I Not Going Underwater?"	2:57
5.	"You Bring Something... No"	1:02
6.	"So I Shotgunned a Beer and Went to Bed"	4:14
7.	"It's Just a Party"	2:40
8.	"Memo Yeah That's Fine Man"	1:24
9.	"Kj Jammin"	2:13
10.	"Damp Feathers"	4:01
11.	"Could Be Better Forever"	3:47
Total length:		29:12
