= How Simple =

Single by Hop Along

from the album Bark Your Head Off, Dog
- Studio: The Headroom (Philadelphia, Pennsylvania)
- Genre: Indie rock
- Length: 3:48
- Label: Saddle Creek Records
- Composer: Hop Along
- Lyricist: Frances Quinlan
- Producers: Hop Along and Joe Reinhart

"How Simple" is a song by Hop Along it is the opening track on the band's fourth full-length album Bark Your Head Off, Dog. It was released as the album's lead single on January 23, 2018.

== Background and recording ==
The song was recorded twice because the band felt the original recording was too fast. They decreased the tempo by two beats per minute for the second attempt, and extended the final chorus. Guitarist Joe Rhinehart told Guitar World that frontperson Frances Quinlan used different vocal phrasings on the second version as well. Quinlan stated the final version was "a lot more disco-y" than the previous version.

== Composition and lyrics ==
According to Vice, "How Simple" is "both a love song and a breakup song". More specifically, the song's lyrics explore the topics of self-love, self-consciousness, aging, mortality salience and the future. Frontperson Frances Quinlan told Guitar World: "With our songs, people feel good first and then bad later. A potpourri of emotions! [...] But I like that! I've told people many times that I'm not a pessimist. You know, I am optimistic, but for us to pretend that we're gonna live forever is just a doomed venture, but also at the same time, I like that it is celebrating relationships even though it has a dark tone to it, 'We will both find out, just not together.' It still says don't worry! That's nice, right?"

"How Simple" is considered to be one of the poppiest songs in Hop Along's discography. The song opens with "crystalline clean-tone electric guitar strummed at a fervent clip," according to NPR. AllMusic states that the song employs "passing moments of dissonance, jerky syncopation, and leaping intervals that move between band members as the rest drive steadily forward." Guitar World said the song contains "razor-sharp pop hooks," and said it was "catchy and accessible". In a review of the album, Pitchfork wrote that the track "adopts a cheery lilt that feels too tucked-in, too starchy, for a heart as unruly as Quinlan’s." In a review of the track, the same publication wrote that the song employs "girl group-style backing vocals".

== Music video ==
A music video was created for the song, which drew visual comparisons to the 1972 film Snoopy Come Home.
