= Well-dressed =

Song by Hop Along

from the album Painted Shut
- Released: May 4, 2015
- Genre: Indie rock, sentimental ballad
- Length: 4:02
- Label: Saddle Creek Records
- Lyricist: Frances Quinlan
- Producers: Hop Along and John Agnello

"Well-dressed" is a song by American indie rock band Hop Along, appearing as the ninth track on their third studio album Painted Shut. The track was included in the band's Tiny Desk Concerts setlist for NPR.

== Lyrics and meaning ==
The track's lyrics were inspired by the life of American cornetist and jazz musician Buddy Bolden, and are written from the perspective of someone enduring a major depressive episode. Stereogum described the track as a "tearjerking, singalong ballad". Quinlan themself told The Line of Best Fit regarding the track's meaning: "I've said it once and I'll say it again: our society wasn't built with most people in mind."
