= Likewise =

Likewise may refer to:

- Likewise, Inc., American technology startup company
- Likewise (Frances Quinlan album), to be released in 2020
- Likewise (Stone House album), released in 2003
- Likewise Open, Active Directory software
