= Hope Fading Nightly =

Studio album by Tellison
- Released: 18 September 2015
- Recorded: Rex Studio, London, 7 November 2013 – 20 August 2014
- Genre: Indie Rock
- Label: Alcopop! Records
- Producer: Andy Jenkin

Tellison chronology
The Wages of Fear (2011)	Hope Fading Nightly (2015)

Singles from Hope Fading Nightly
- 1. "Tact Is Dead" Released: 4 March 2015; 2. "Boy" Released: 2 July 2015; 3. "Wrecker" Released: 3 November 2015

Hope Fading Nightly is the third studio album by English indie rock band Tellison, released on 18 September 2015. Produced by Andy Jenkin, the album was the band's first release through Alcopop! Records. The band focused on creating a more guitar centric album, moving away from using samples and keyboards that featured on their previous albums. It also features their longtime touring guitarist Richard Peter Snapes, who departed the band upon its completion.

Tellison recorded the album over a nine-month period, working at REX Studio's in Highbury, London with Jenkin producing his first full-length album. The album's release was preceded by pay what you want singles "Tact is Dead", released on 5 March 2015, "Boy" released on 2 July 2015 with third single "Wrecker" being released on 3 November 2015.

== Recording and production ==
After finishing their record deal with Naim Edge, having their management quit, their lawyer tell the band he did not wish to represent them anymore and their booking agent quit the music industry the band made the decision to retreat back into their jobs outside of Tellison. "We let Tellison lie and dealt with the body blows of having everyone around you feel like you aren’t worth the effort" singer and guitarist Stephen Davidson explained in an interview. The band's disappointment with the performance of The Wages of Fear and their feeling that they have not been as successful as they had hoped would become a recurring theme for the Davidson and Peter Phillips' lyrics.

Around a year later the band reconvened and began working on new material that was demoed by Davidson and Phillips in June 2012. After attempts to sign a new record-deal proved fruitless, the band decided to self finance the sessions. In July 2012, Davidson retreated to a "creaky old house by the sea" near Gullane, Scotland where he wrote the song "Wrecker", although had previously intended to write the entire album.

The band officially began recording on 7 November 2013 with producer Andy Jenkin, a close friend of the band who was himself "figuring out a new studio and a new way of working". The band decided to work with Jenkin as they felt he could encapsulate the middle ground between the organic "guys in a practice room" or "punk-rock" sound and polished "pop". Recording took place at REX Studio in Highbury, London.

The sessions for the album predominately took place between jobs. "I’d work ten hours a day then catch the bus to Highbury and stay in the studio until either I or Andy passed out or started shouting at each other" Davidson recalled. The band produced sixteen tracks during the album sessions, which was eventually narrowed down to twelve. Around six months into recording, guitarist Richard Peter Snapes left the band in order to concentrate on his career as a baker. It took the band around nine months to complete the record, which Davidson attributed to "I’m a stickler for detail and we spent a lot of time trying to make sure parts complimented one another".

== Music and influence ==
"Much of the record is about a period of time a year or two ago, where we didn’t have a third record on the horizon and I was just on my own in my bedroom, not knowing if we were going to make another album, or break up. I was working in rubbish jobs, and commuting, feeling really bad about how I’d spent my life up until that point"

— Stephen Davidson

The band had been touring for some time with Richard Peter Snapes, who added live keyboards, guitar and vocals therefore they decided to make the record with the full five-piece band. Many of the new tracks split the lead guitar parts between both Davidson, Phillips and Snapes, instead of "just smashing out for chords for three minutes". They were influenced by bands such as The Mountain Goats, Hop Along, The Weakerthans and Drive By Truckers. Despite being their first album as a five-piece, the band decided to predominately concentrate on their core instruments; guitar, bass and drums, as opposed to previous albums where they used string samples and keyboards. As with previous recording sessions Davidson wrote and sung lead vocals on the majority of songs, whilst Peter Phillips wrote and sung lead vocals on two of the album's tracks.

Davidson was partly inspired by his own experiences within the band, leading to the sentiment of failure expressed on the opening track on the album "Letter to the Team (After Another Imperfect Season)". He apologised to his fellow band members, past and present for failing them before resigning from the band. "If this was any other pursuit or professional endeavour, I would have been fired a long time ago! Things clearly aren’t working out" Davidson said of his managing of Tellison which lead to the song's lyrics. The song quotes the popular line "Pain heals. Chicks dig scars. Glory... lasts forever" from the film The Replacements. The second track "Helix & Ferman" deals with fears held by Davidson of having "no prospects or plans" with references to Nabokov's novel Despair.

The third track of the record "Boy" was written by Peter Phillips. Phillips was originally reluctant to work on the song, which resulted in the rest of the band demoing it without him, with Davidson singing nonsense in place of Phillips vocals. Davidson believed his bandmate sometimes "doesn’t appear to realise when he’s written something great" recalling similar circumstances with another of Phillips tracks "Gallery" from their album Contact! Contact!. The track was written in retrospect by Phillips about a past failed relationship and examining how relevant that experience should still be to his life now. Fourth track "Wrecker" was written by Davidson as a confession and apology for wrecking things and relationships. Written during a period of unemployment in July 2012 the band described the lyrics as being about "how people can slowly fall out of love over months and years through a thousand tiny failures to care, to pay attention to one another, to remember why you fell in love in the first place".

"Tact is Dead" charts Davidson's first realisation that he would likely not achieve his dreams as well as his feelings of apathy, betrayal and disappointment of believing in meritocracy and that if he was polite and worked hard that he would be ok. The track reflects on Davidson's experiences working demeaning and low paying jobs after completing his degree whilst again using gallows humour in his writing with lines such as "throw me into a tube train, pay me the minimum wage". Davidson's lyrics reference Herman Melville's short story Bartleby, the Scrivener, as well as making nods to work by F. Scott Fitzgerald, Joseph Conrad and Woody Allen.

The eleventh track on the album "My Marengo" deals with the loss of one of Davidson's best friends to suicide ten years previously. Davidson attempts to unpick both viewpoints, whether to give up on life or whether to keep on going, ultimately rejecting his friends decision to take his life. The track makes reference to Napoleon's horse Marengo which Napoleon named after Battle of Marengo "to remind him that, though things might seem totally futile, there's no such thing as a lost cause" explained Davidson. The final track on the album "Tsundoku" was again written by Davidson. Tsundoku is a Japanese word for the act of 'constantly buying books and letting them pile up without getting the chance to read them' which Davidson related back to Tellison as a band "All those overlooked possibilities, all those unfulfilled potentials". The track began as Davidson attempting to replicate the writing style of Frances Quinlan of Hop Along, hoping to produce a track that is "at first seemingly jagged to the point of being almost uncomfortable that eventually reveals more and more of itself and rewards repeated listens". Davidson held some "serious and troubling reservations" over the track as he believed it was 98% complete.

== Release and promotion ==
The first track to arrive from the sessions was in the form of standalone Christmas single "Snow (Don't Tell The Truth This Christmas)", which was released independently through online retailers on 16 December 2013. Proceeds from the single were donated to the charity Campaign Against Living Miserably.

Having financed and recorded the album without a record label, the band then set out to sell the album, receiving interest from various record labels. Davidson believed many of them either weren't really interested in helping the band, or they expected the band to come to them on a "bended knee" for contracts that would have crippled them creatively and financially, joking "uh, a third album from a band who’ve been around ages and not really done anything? I guess we’ll do it, but it’s not gonna be good!" The band made the decision to sign to Alcopop! Records which Davidson described as a "no brainer". The band began regularly performing their new track "Helix & Ferman" at live performances in late 2012 and onwards.

The first single titled "Tact Is Dead" premiered on 4 March 2015 as a free download with, an accompanying music video directed by Malcolm Greenhill. The single was also released as a limited edition cassette tape and as a digital EP on 27 April 2015, featuring three remixes of the track, as well as an acoustic demo of new track "Boy". The band also embarked on a six date UK tour in April and May in support of the single.

The second single "Boy" premiered on the BBC Radio 1 Rock Show on 12 April 2015, before being released as a digital single on 2 July 2015 with b-side "Epi". The following day on 3 July 2015, the album Hope Fading Nightly was officially announced, with release scheduled for 18 September 2015 through Alcopop! Records. The album would be released on CD, digital, standard vinyl and a splatter print vinyl.

Over the summer months of 2015 the band performed at Hit The Deck Festival, 2000 Trees Festival, Truck Festival and Y Not Festival.

A week prior to the album's release, The Independent made the entire album available to stream online with a track-by-track guide to the album penned by Stephen Davidson. The release of the album was celebrated with a special show at St Pancras Old Church on 18 September 2015, followed by a nine date tour of the United Kingdom in support of the new record. In addition to their sold-out show at The Lexington in London on 27 September, the band also performed in-store at Banquet Records in Kingston upon Thames.

Third single "Wrecker" was announced and released on 3 November 2015. The single was released as a limited bowling shirt with accompanying digital download that included the b-side "Black Rhyme". The release was accompanied by the announcing of their ten-date tour of the United Kingdom in April through until May 2016. On 5 November 2015 it was announced that the band would perform Hope Fading Nightly in its entirety at Alcopop Records own Alcopopalooza showcase on 23 January 2016 at The Windmill, Brixton.

== Critical reception ==
Hope Fading Nightly
Review scores
Source	Rating
Drowned in Sound	8/10 stars
DIY	4/5 stars
Clash	8/10 stars
Upset	4/5 stars
Bring the Noise	8/10 stars
Hit the Floor	8/10 stars
Punktastic	Positive
Dead Press	7/10 stars

Hope Fading Nightly has been positively received by music critics.

Critics emphasised Davidson's intelligent songwriting. Writing for The Independent, Remfry Dedman called Hope Fading Nightly "a truly great album" and that "given the passage of time is surely destined to become a classic for those who like intelligent indie-pop underdog anthems". Writing for Drowned in Sound, Sammy Maine called the band "stronger than ever" despite the album being the "personification of the quarter-life crisis", believing that opening track "Letter to the Team" represented Stephen H Davidson's finest writing to date. Rob Barbour wrote for Punktastic that Hope Fading Nightly "might be the strongest collection of songs released by a British artist this year" and that "whether angry or heartbroken, apologetic or apoplectic, Tellison can’t help but sound achingly honest and stunningly, heartbreakingly melodic." Gareth O'Malley reviewed the album for Clash Magazine calling it "desperate, despondent and heart wrenching listen from start to finish".

Reviewers also highlighted the band's level of success, how it may have contributed towards creating the album as well as questioning whether Hope Fading Nightly would improve the popularity of Tellison. Antoine Omisore of Hit the Floor proclaimed that whilst the album would not propel them into the mainstream it was "drenched in lively melodies and suffocates you with stylishly shrewd lyrics". Tom Connick wrote for Upset "Hope Fading Nightly probably won’t bring Tellison fame and fortune" but affirmed it would "remain impossibly important to those who are privy to its charms" and that was sometimes more important than success. Writing for DIY Magazine, Stephen Ackroyd proclaimed "If Tellison were half as big as Tellison should be, they'd be currently selling out their third night straight at Brixton Academy. But if Tellison were half as big as Tellison should be, they'd not be writing albums like Hope Fading Nightly". Emily Laws of Bring the Noise believed that the album was "easily their strongest work" to date and that they deserved to finally start going places.

== Track listing ==
All music is composed by Stephen H Davidson, Peter Phillips, Henry Danowski, Andrew Tickell and Richard Peter Snapes.

No.	Title	Writer(s)	Length
1.	"Letter to the Team (After Another Imperfect Season)"	Stephen Davidson	03:14
2.	"Helix & Ferman"	Davidson	02:51
3.	"Boy"	Peter Phillips	02:33
4.	"Wrecker"	Davidson	02:44
5.	"Rookie of the Year"	Davidson	03:23
6.	"Detective"	Davidson	03:24
7.	"Tact is Dead"	Davidson	03:29
8.	"Orion"	Davidson	03:32
9.	"Mendokusai"	Davidson	03:46
10.	"Hellhole"	Phillips	04:02
11.	"My Marengo"	Davidson	03:17
12.	"Tsundoku"	Davidson	04:39

Additional tracks recorded during the Hope Fading Nightly sessions
No.	Title	Writer(s)	Length
1.	"Snow (Don't Tell the Truth This Christmas)" (Standalone single)	Davidson	03:28
2.	"Epi" (B-side to the "Boy" single)	Davidson	01:29
3.	"Black Rhyme" (B-side to the "Wrecker" single)	Davidson	03:12
4.	"Toby" (Unreleased)

== Personnel ==
Tellison

- Stephen H Davidson - lead vocals, guitars
- Peter Phillips - vocals, guitars
- Henry Danowski - drums, programming
- Andrew Tickell - bass, vocals
- Richard Peter Snapes - guitar, vocals

Session musicians

- Luke Leighfield - piano, keyboards

Production

- Andy Jenkin - producer
- Alan Douches - mastering
- Tom Laskowski - artwork
- Lloyd Cook - artwork
