= Enda Kenny (singer) =

Australian singer

Enda Kenny is an Irish-born Australian folk-singer and songwriter.

Kenny was born in Dublin on 17th March 1960, and migrated to Melbourne in 1987. He released his debut album, Twelve Songs, in 1994. Though self-recorded and self-released, the album received generally solid reviews, and was described by the Sydney Morning Herald as "the best folk album to be released in this country since Eric Bogle's "Scraps of Paper". It was followed by Baker's Dozen in 1996, which received similarly positive reviews.

A song from that album, Rabin, about assassinated former Israeli Prime Minister Yitzhak Rabin, won the Lawson Paterson Award for Songwriting at the Port Fairy Folk Festival. This was followed with a third album, Six of One in 1998, which featured a number of covers, and was less well reviewed. Kenny's song The Language of the Land from Twelve Songs was covered by English folk singer Roy Bailey in the same year.

After a brief hiatus, Kenny released his fourth album, Cloud Lining, in 2001, again receiving positive reviews. He released his album, Here and There in 2005. In his review of Here and There, Sydney Morning Herald music reviewer Bruce Elder described Kenny as "the best folk singer-songwriter working in Australia."

He has regularly performed at a number of music festivals around the country, including the National Folk Festival, Port Fairy Folk Festival and Illawarra Folk Festival.

== Discography ==
- Twelve Songs (1994)
- Baker's Dozen (1995)
- Six of One (1997)
- Cloud Lining (2001)
- Here and There (2005)
- Pearler (2007)
- Heart Tattoo (2013)
- Kitchen Ballads (2019)
- After the Interval (2024)
