= I Saw My Twin =

Song by Hop Along
- Genre: Indie rock
- Length: 3:23
- Label: Saddle Creek Records
- Composer: Hop Along
- Lyricist: Frances Quinlan

"I Saw My Twin" is a song by American indie rock band Hop Along, released as the eighth track on their third album Painted Shut. WXPN said the track was the "album standout".

== Background and lyrics ==
Hop Along frontperson and lyricist Frances Quinlan said "I Saw My Twin" was written about a waitress who served them at a Waffle House. Quinlan told The Line of Best Fit that the song references the 2014 Elk River chemical spill with its mention of the US state of West Virginia. WXPN stated that in the track, "Quinlan paints a 'Tom's Diner'-esque slice-of-life portrait."

Quinlan told Stereogum that the song was the most difficult for them to track during the album's production: "I had the hardest time with that song. My voice is very... kind of in-your-face, and I was having a hard time making it work. But every song for me is the hardest thing I've ever done in my life. Almost painful."

WNYC Studios said the song musically "crackle[s] and burn[s] with distorted guitars and unrelenting drums."
