= Get Disowned =

2012 album

Studio album by Hop Along
- Released: May 5, 2012
- Genre: Indie rock
- Length: 40:03
- Label: Hot Green Records, Big Scary Monsters, Saddle Creek
- Producer: Hop Along

Hop Along chronology
Freshman Year (2005)	Get Disowned (2012)	Painted Shut (2015)

Professional ratings
Review scores
Source	Rating
AllMusic	3.5/5 stars
Pitchfork	8.5/10
PopMatters	8/10
Punknews.org	4.5/5 stars
Spin	7/10
Sputnikmusic	4.0/5

Get Disowned is Hop Along's second full-length album. It was released in March 2012 on Hot Green Records in the US and Big Scary Monsters in the UK/Europe. In 2016 it was reissued by Saddle Creek.

== Background and recording ==
Hop Along approached former Algernon Cadwallader guitarist Joe Reinhart to produce the album because vocalist Frances Quinlan preferred to work with a friend rather than a stranger. The band was met with time constraints during recording due to the members being involved with other projects. Consequently, the recording process lasted two years. Because of this, Quinlan described the album as a "collage". They recounted, "I remember going to my job, taking the train, and then racing back on my bike to the warehouse to get working on the record because we had five days and then we’d have a month until we could get to work on it again".

The album contains lyrical themes involving death and loss.

== Reception and legacy ==
Get Disowned was met with acclaim several years after its original release. In 2018, Stereogum cited the album as a "crucial" work of Philadelphia indie rock in the early 2010s, along with Hurry's Everything/Nothing.

Get Disowned was ranked on several decade-end lists. BrooklynVegan's Andrew Sacher dubbed it "the kind of album that was just too good to stay underground forever." He singled out its "raw, humble charm" that helped it "remain just as much a gem as it was the day it was quietly released."

Blink-182 bassist and vocalist Mark Hoppus referred to the album's second track "Tibetan Pop Stars" as "the most painfully beautiful song ever". The track has continued to receive critical acclaim in recent years. In a 2020 list ranking emo's 100 best songs, the staff of Vulture placed the track highly at #10. The site's David Anthony wrote that it "so succinctly summed up everything great about the genre", noting the band's perfectly achieving "a distinct subtlety" evident in other of emo's best bands. In a 2022 article listing emo's "most important" songs for each year from 1985 to then, The Ringer chose "Stars" for the year 2012.

=== Accolades ===
Critical rankings for Get Disowned
Publication	Country	Type	List	Year	Rank	Ref.
The A.V. Club	US	Decade-end	The 50 best albums of the 2010s	2019	23	
BrooklynVegan	US	Decade-end	141 Best Albums of the 2010s	2019	54	
WXPN	US	Decade-end	The 25 Best Albums of the Decade, 2010–2019	2019	13	
Sputnikmusic	US	Decade-end	Top 100 Albums of the 2010s	2020	22	

== Track listing ==
No.	Title	Length
1.	"Some Grace"	3:07
2.	"Tibetan Pop Stars"	4:21
3.	"Diamond Mine"	5:32
4.	"No Good Al Joad"	3:27
5.	"Kids on the Boardwalk"	2:50
6.	"Laments"	6:43
7.	"Trouble Found Me"	3:46
8.	"Sally II"	2:32
9.	"Young and Happy!"	4:53
10.	"Get Disowned"	2:52
Total length:		40:03

== Personnel ==
Hop Along

- Tyler Long - bass
- Frances Quinlan - vocal, guitar, piano, steel drum, rhodes, banjo, autoharp
- Mark Quinlan - drums, percussion, organ, accordion, piano
- Joe Reinhart - guitar, bass, synthesizer, piano, rhodes, tambourine

Additional musicians

- Chrissy Tashjian - backing vocals (tracks: 1, 2, 3, 5, 9, & 10)
- Dominic Angelella - guitar (tracks: 2, 3, 4, 5, 6, 8, & 9)

Production

- Joe Reinhart - engineering
- Ryan Schwabe - mastering
- Peter Helmis - layout
