= Likewise (Frances Quinlan album) =

2020 album

Studio album by Frances Quinlan
- Released: January 31, 2020
- Studio: Headroom (Philadelphia)
- Genre: Indie rock
- Label: Saddle Creek
- Producers: Joe Reinhart, Frances Quinlan

Singles from Likewise
- 1. "Rare Thing" Released: October 22, 2019; 2. "Now That I'm Back" Released: November 19, 2019; 3. "Your Reply" Released: 2020

Likewise is the debut studio album by Frances Quinlan of Hop Along. It was released on January 31, 2020, by Saddle Creek Records.

== Style and lyrics ==
The album makes use of strings, keyboards, piano, slide guitar and unorthodox percussion instruments.

Lyrically, Quinlan's lyrics on Likewise are much more personal in nature as opposed to the narrative style of their work on Hop Along albums. They elaborated, "I’ve tried to be an omniscient narrator, but I suppose I am in that chapter of life where it doesn’t feel truthful for me at the moment".

== Background and production ==
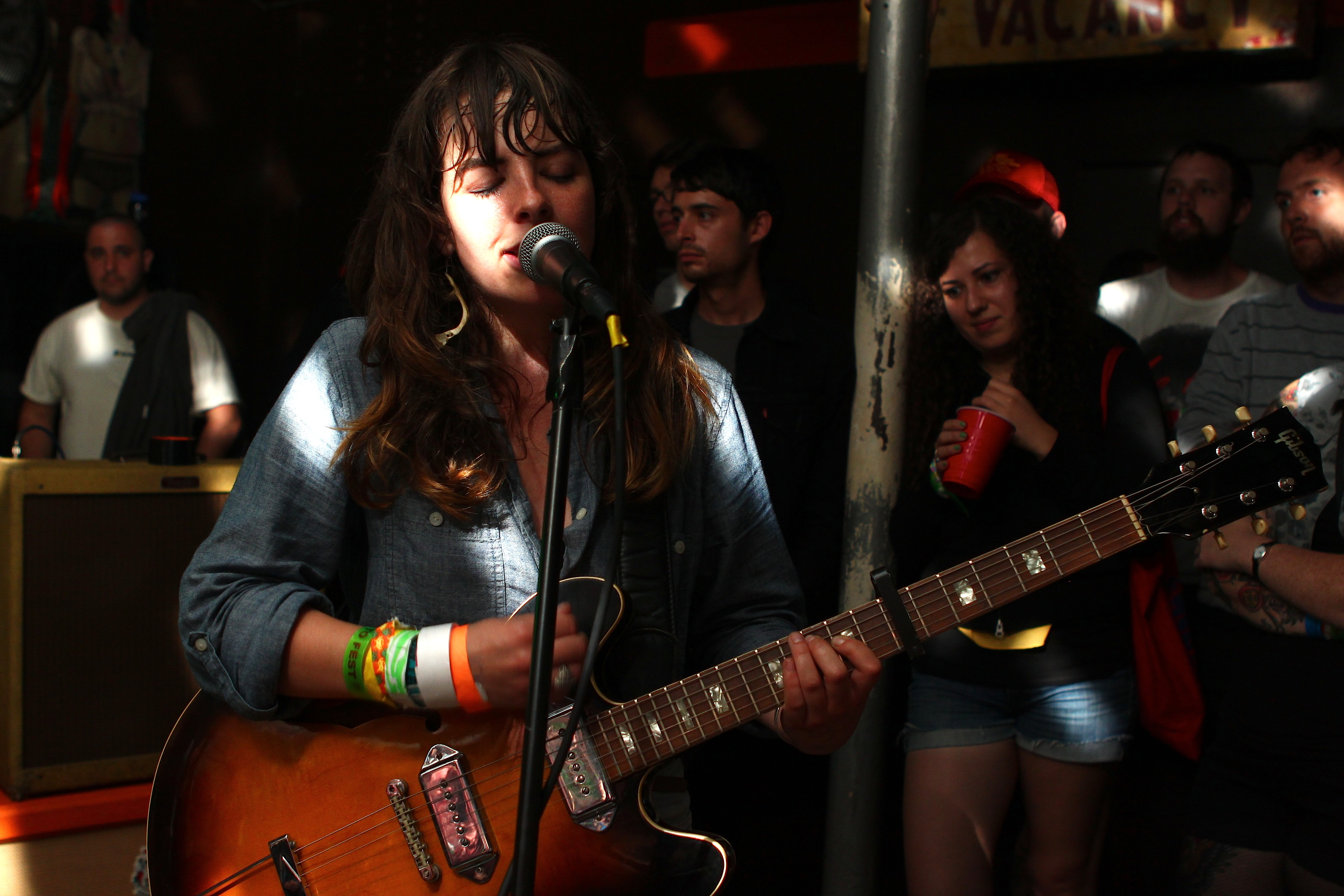
Quinlan in 2012

Likewise is Frances Quinlan's first solo album under their own name. Quinlan had earlier released a solo album, Freshman Year, as Hop Along, Queen Ansleis, in 2005. Quinlan felt that the recording experience opened their instrumentation palette beyond the guitar and made them a more adventurous collaborator. New instruments in their repertoire include strings, autoharp, and synthesizers. Likewise was recorded with Joe Reinhart, a bandmate from Hop Along.

The album's tracks “A Secret” and “Went To LA” were originally written in 2013 and recorded for Bark Your Head Off, Dog. However, because the album was getting "too long", and because Quinlan felt the songs already felt "pretty complete" in their stripped-down forms, the tracks were cut from the album and used on Likewise.

Quinlan created the album's cover art.

== Release and promotion ==
Saddle Creek announced the record in October 2019 for a January 31, 2020, release. The lead single, "Rare Thing", accompanied the announcement. Based on a dream about their infant niece, the song explores the ability to love generously. Likewise's second single, "Now That I'm Back", followed the next month. The song addresses the long road of learning to compromise in a romantic relationship. Quinlan released "Your Reply", a celebratory song about nearly understanding someone, early in January 2020. The album's last song, a cover of Built to Spill's "Carry the Zero", is a favorite of Quinlan's, often played in their solo sets and soundchecks.

A limited edition release of the album on colored vinyl included autographed artwork. A promotional tour for the album is set to run from January to March 2020.

== Critical reception ==
Professional ratings
Aggregate scores
Source	Rating
AnyDecentMusic?	7.4/10
Metacritic	83/100
Review scores
Source	Rating
AllMusic	4/5 stars
Consequence of Sound	B+
DIY	4/5 stars
Exclaim!	6/10
The Line of Best Fit	8.5/10
Paste	8.9/10
Pitchfork	7.7/10
The Skinny	4/5 stars
Under the Radar	7/10

At Metacritic, which assigns a weighted average rating out of 100 to reviews from mainstream publications, this release received an average score of 83, based on 12 reviews. The album was one of Pitchfork's most anticipated in 2020.

=== Accolades ===
Accolades for Likewise
Publication	Accolade	Rank	Ref.
Consequence of Sound	Top 50 Albums of 2020	24	
Paste	Paste's 25 Best Albums of 2020 – Mid-Year	23	
Rolling Stone	Rolling Stone's 50 Best Albums of 2020 – Mid-Year	—N/a	
Stereogum	Stereogum's 50 Best Albums of 2020 – Mid-Year	36	

== Track listing ==
Likewise track listing
No.	Title	Writer(s)	Length
1.	"Piltdown Man"	Frances Quinlan	3:15
2.	"Your Reply"	Frances Quinlan	4:19
3.	"Rare Thing"	Frances Quinlan	3:30
4.	"Detroit Lake"	Frances Quinlan	3:22
5.	"A Secret"	Frances Quinlan	4:40
6.	"Went to LA"	Frances Quinlan	3:56
7.	"Lean"	Frances Quinlan	3:51
8.	"Now That I'm Back"	Frances Quinlan	3:18
9.	"Carry the Zero" (Built to Spill cover)	Doug Martsch	4:23
Total length:			34:34

== See also ==
- List of 2020 albums
