= Painted Shut =

Studio album by Hop Along
- Released: May 4, 2015
- Recorded: 2015, Headroom Studios, Philadelphia, Pennsylvania
- Genres: Indie rock; folk rock; power pop; pop-punk; emo revival
- Length: 39:54
- Label: Saddle Creek
- Producers: Hop Along; John Agnello

Hop Along chronology
Get Disowned (2012)	Painted Shut (2015)	Bark Your Head Off, Dog (2018)

Painted Shut is the third studio album by American indie rock band Hop Along, released on May 4, 2015 through Saddle Creek Records.

The fourth track "Waitress" was released as a single from the album. The band toured the US in support of the album in Spring of 2015.

== Background and recording ==
Painted Shut was co-produced, engineered and mixed by John Agnello (who has previously worked with Dinosaur Jr. and Sonic Youth) and the band themselves in early 2015 at Headroom Studios in Philadelphia, and at Fluxivity Studios in Brooklyn. Lead vocalist Frances Quinlan stated that much of the album was tracked live. The album was recorded over a period of one month.

== Music ==
=== Musical style and instrumentation ===
Pitchfork likened Painted Shut's style to the "romantic, middle-American indie" of artists such as Bright Eyes and Rilo Kiley, while crediting punk rock for the band's "energy". Correspondingly, Marcy Donelson AllMusic set forth the album's style as "punk-spirited indie rock". Rachel Brodsky Spin said the album contains "guitar-driven" tracks and "pop-oriented melodies with a voice that sounds like it could use a soothing throat lozenge". Additionally, the album has been said to include elements of country. The album's guitar riffs have been described as "melodic" and "sometimes angular", and have been compared to late-1990s emo and "Built To Spill-style rock". According to Phillip Cosores of Consequence, "The guitars, played by bassist Tyler Long and the rhythm and lead pair of Frances Quinlan and Joe Reinhart, find distinct, warm ways to play off each other, rarely falling into stereotypical rock band traps." The album's seventh track "Powerful Man" makes use of bar chords and the palm-muted and plucked guitar work. Mark Quinlan's drum work on the album has been described as "highly technical," and makes use of start-stop rhythms, such as on the album's sixth track, “Texas Funeral.” Stereogum said the album's tracks "build up, layer upon layer upon layer, adding things gradually until they explode in a fiery passion."

The album features distorted guitars and incorporates elements of Americana. The album makes use of unorthodox instruments, such as an electric sitar in the intro of "Waitress", and a harp on "The Knock". Additionally, the album's fifth track "Happy To See Me" is an acoustic track that has been described as "stripped back to the bone" and reminiscent of the band's freak folk roots. Additionally, the album contains elements of “traditional” blues rock.

Frances Quinlan’s vocal performance on the album is characterized as alternating between "an abrasive snarl and a smooth croon.”

=== Lyrical themes ===
The album's lyrical subject matter explores topics such as poverty, greed, abuse, guilt, grief, nostalgia, regret and mental illness. The album's fourth track "Waitress" was written about a time Quinlan ran into an old friend while working in a restaurant. They explained, “It’s about one of the first times when I looked at somebody and felt the distaste in the air [...] I mean, I could have been making it up. You don’t know what people think about you, but just being in a situation where you know someone has reason to be disgusted with you. And I was just trying to do my job. It was one of the first times I felt really small." The album's fifth track "Happy To See Me" has been called a "ballad of caustic nostalgia."

The album's seventh track "Powerful Man" is based on an experience Quinlan had as a teenager, where they claim to have witnessed a young child being physically abused by their father. Quinlan admitted that the track was the first time they had felt uneasy about sharing lyrics, due to their personal nature. They said, "There’s part of me that thinks, is anyone going to care if I yell at this man? [...] There is something about parents hitting their kids, it’s just such a weird thing that we allow [...] The craziest thing was he saw us, looked us in the face, and had no reaction. It just didn’t register that we were any threat. And then he said “She’s not gonna help you.” He felt nothing that we were there. It in no way affected his behavior." The tracks “Buddy in the Parade” and “Well-dressed” are based on the life of jazz cornet player Buddy Bolden, who Quinlan learned of while enrolled in a memento mori class in college. The track “Horseshoe Crabs” is based on the life of folk musician Jackson C. Frank.

According to Abby Jones of Stereogum, the album "often finds its characters at these types of moral crossroads, weighed by the burden of simply knowing too much."

== Critical reception ==
Writing for VICE, music critic Robert Christgau gave the album an A− score, and assessed: "Not virtuosos but not newbies either, they recall Pavement both ways, with the crucial distinction that Quinlan’s lyrics hint at the concrete situations and emotions shrewd 90s ironists eschewed and arty millennial obscurantists look down on. Quite a singer, Quinlan—tiptoeing along the edge of [their] range, [they] often leap or tumbles into the unknown. And every time [they] do, there’s a chance your heart will jump with [them]."

Matt Williams of Exclaim! wrote: "There is no voice in popular music right now that quite comes close to the elastic immediacy of that of Hop Along's Frances Quinlan. It's the Philadelphia punk band's most compelling, dynamic instrument, from hushed confessions to heart-wrenching screams, and it's in full force on their breakthrough sophomore effort, Painted Shut."

Rachel Brodsky of Spin wrote: "Central bulbs in the now-blinding chandelier of Philly indie-punk, Hop Along’s thrilling sophomore effort plays out like sonic arrhythmia — it seems impossible that Frances Quinlan could successfully quaver through such a variety of highs and lows without being sent into cardiac arrest. [...] And yet she rarely overwhelms her bandmates: Drummer (and brother) Mark Quinlan deserves accolades for his perennially discombobulated rhythms, just as the rest of the band should take a bow for astutely playing around them."

AllMusic awarded the album four-and-a-half stars, directing praise towards Frances Quinlan's vocal performance and raw lyrics, and calling the songs "catchy" and the instrumentation "tight and gritty". New Noise Magazine called the album well-rounded, saying "each song is just as powerful and quirky as the one before and after it." In 2017, Spin ranked Painted Shut #6 on their list of the emo revival's best albums. The site's Leor Galil saw it as the record where Hop Along "focused their frisson and aimed it towards pop", resulting in "hits only they could create."

Phillip Cosores of Consequence wrote, "The album proves the singer’s will to catapult into greatness, standing as a testament to just how far a great front-person can push a tried-and-true formula."

Writing for VICE Magazine, Robert Christgau said: "Quite a singer, Quinlan—tiptoeing along the edge of her range, she often leaps or tumbles into the unknown. And every time she does, there’s a chance your heart will jump with her."

Mike Powell of Pitchfork wrote: "Singer Francis Quinlan is a sharp writer who understands the poetry of deflection, and her songs feel like a series of false floors that open to bigger and bigger rooms."

Professional ratings
Aggregate scores
Source	Rating
AnyDecentMusic?	7.9/10
Metacritic	87/100
Review scores
Source	Rating
AllMusic	4.5/5 stars
The A.V. Club	A−
Consequence of Sound	B+
Exclaim!	9/10
NME	8/10
Pitchfork	7.9/10
Rolling Stone	4/5 stars
Spin	8/10
Uncut	8/10
Vice (Expert Witness)	A−

=== Accolades ===
Publication	Accolade	Year	Rank
Vice	The 50 Best Albums of 2015	2015	8
The A.V. Club	The 15 Best Albums of 2015	2015	15
Consequence	Top 50 Albums of 2015	2015	44
Stereogum	The 50 Best Albums of 2015	2015	7
Spin	30 Best Emo Revival Albums, Ranked	2017	6
Pitchfork	The 200 Best Albums of the 2010s	2019	164

== Track listing ==
No.	Title	Length
1.	"The Knock"	3:33
2.	"Buddy in the Parade"	3:47
3.	"Horseshoe Crabs"	4:01
4.	"Waitress"	3:33
5.	"Happy to See Me"	4:35
6.	"Texas Funeral"	4:28
7.	"Powerful Man"	3:25
8.	"I Saw My Twin"	3:23
9.	"Well-Dressed"	4:02
10.	"Sister Cities"	5:07

== Charts ==
Chart (2015)	Peak position
US Heatseekers Albums (Billboard)	10
US Independent Albums (Billboard)	26
US Top Rock Albums (Billboard)	41

== Personnel ==
- Frances Quinlan - vocals, guitar
- Mark Quinlan - drums
- Tyler Long - bass
- Joe Reinhart - guitar, backing vocals
