= Catalina Fight Song =

Single by Joyce Manor

from the album Never Hungover Again
- Released: May 15, 2014
- Genre: Punk rock; indie rock
- Length: 1:05
- Label: Epitaph
- Songwriters: Barry Johnson; Chase Knobbe; Kurt Walcher; Matt Ebert
- Producer: Joe Reinhart

Joyce Manor singles chronology
"Violent Inside" (2012)	"Catalina Fight Song" (2014)	"Schley" (2014)

"Catalina Fight Song" is a song recorded by the American rock band Joyce Manor. The song was released on May 15, 2014, through Epitaph Records, as the lead single from the band's third studio album Never Hungover Again. The song, which shares songwriting credits with all members of the band, focuses on frustration with life and refers to Santa Catalina Island, off the coast of Southern California. The song uses quick concepts and vivid imagery to achieve a sense of listlessness.

Critics viewed "Catalina Fight Song" as a highlight from Never Hungover Again, with many praising its ability to resonate with people who have experienced struggles. Its music video depicts Joyce Manor beaten by jiu-jitsu coaches. It has gone viral on social media due to its frequently misheard opening lyric. Ten years after its debut, the band performed the song live on John Mulaney's Netflix talk series Everybody's in L.A..

== Background ==
"Catalina Fight Song" shares songwriting credits between all of the members of Joyce Manor at that time. Frontman Barry Johnson claimed that the song's origins were spotty, but center on frustration with life. The song refers to Santa Catalina Island, off the coast of the band's native Southern California. Locals refer to the island's cliffs and edges "the end of the world". The brief song—only one minute in length—issues rapid-fire concepts in a series of short couplets: "There’s no way to keep in touch with certain people / You wonder how long something can last / Pretty sure most people don’t think about that / But who the fuck’s laughing now?". It utilizes quick imagery—hot Gatorade in a car, a Target inside of a suburban shopping mall—to achieve a sense of listlessness. Its opening lyric has been frequently misheard as "suckin' titty by the ocean".

== Release and reception ==
Epitaph issued "Catalina Fight Song" as the lead single from Never Hungover Again on May 15, 2014 on Noisey, alongside a music video. In the clip, the band members are beaten up by jiu-jitsu coaches.

Dan Ozzi at Vice called the tune "relentlessly addictive," while Leor Galil in Rolling Stone interpreted the song as an anthem of "post-adolescent malaise." Ian Cohen, writing for Pitchfork, depicted the song as a "64-second perpetual crescendo that’s missing the expected, vestigial four-minute run-up." Ten years later, in a retrospective profile of its parent album, Cohen opined that the song "has emerged as Joyce Manor’s defining moment [...] If not aspirational, it’s at least familiar, comforting, or even validating for people who’ve been the oldhead at the pop-punk gig or the youngest person at the dead-end job, thinking to themselves, "So, this was growing up?'" Grace Robins-Somerville wrote for Paste that the song's "barked verses mask[s] deep-seated regret." Danielle Chelosky at Stereogum concurred: "The lyrics are visceral fragments strung together; the songs often overflow with idiosyncratic imagery that leads to a revelatory one-liner, often about a lingering sense of loss."

Ten years after the song's debut, the band performed the tune live on John Mulaney's Netflix talk series Everybody's in L.A. at his request.
