= An Occurrence at Owl Creek Bridge (film) =

- Directed by: Robert Enrico
- Written by: Robert Enrico
- Based on: "An Occurrence at Owl Creek Bridge" by Ambrose Bierce
- Produced by: Paul de Roubaix; Marcel Ichac
- Starring: Roger Jacquet; Anne Cornaly
- Cinematography: Jean Boffety
- Edited by: Robert Enrico; Denise de Casabianca
- Music by: Henri Lanoë
- Production companies: Franco-London Films; Sinfonia Films; Les Films du Centaure
- Distributed by: Pathé Distribution
- Release date: 1961
- Running time: 28 minutes
- Country: France
- Languages: English; French

An Occurrence at Owl Creek Bridge (French: La Rivière du hibou, lit. 'The Owl River') is a 1961 French short film, written and directed by Robert Enrico, based on the 1890 short story by Ambrose Bierce. It was produced by Marcel Ichac and Paul de Roubaix with music by Henri Lanoë. It won awards at the Cannes Film Festival and the Academy Awards.

The film was later screened on American television as episode 22 of the fifth season of The Twilight Zone on 28 February 1964.

== Plot ==
A handbill posted on a burnt tree, dated 1862, announces that any civilian caught interfering with bridges, railroads, or tunnels will be summarily executed. Union troops prepare a civilian prisoner, Peyton Farquhar, for death by hanging from a rural railroad bridge. The soundtrack contains only bird noises and brief military orders. As the rope is adjusted about Farquhar's neck, a vision of his home, wife and children flashes before him.

When Farquhar is dropped from the bridge, the rope breaks and he falls into the river. He frees himself from his bonds, removes his boots and begins swimming downstream as the troops fire at him. Farquhar is swept through rapids and crawls ashore exhausted but laughing with relief. Glimpses of tree branches, sky and crawling insects are interrupted by a distant cannon shot which sends him running through a forest, then along a linear and orderly lane. Finally arriving at the gates of his home, he pushes his way through foliage. Farquhar reaches open lawn and runs toward his wife as she walks toward him, smiling and weeping.

Just as the couple are about to fall into each other's arms, Farquhar stiffens and gasps, and his head snaps back. The scene cuts back to his body hanging from the bridge, his entire escape and reunion with his wife revealed to be an illusion experienced in the moment of the drop.

== Cast ==
- Roger Jacquet as Peyton Farquhar
- Anne Cornaly as Abby Farquhar
- Anker-Spang Larsen as Union Officer (as Anker Larsen)
- Stéphane Fey as Union Captain
- Jean-François Zeller as Union Sergeant
- Pierre Danny as Union Soldier
- Louis Adelin as Union Soldier

== Production ==
The film was part of a trilogy of short films that Enrico directed, adapted from Bierce short stories, the two others being "Chickamauga" and "The Mocking-Bird." Together, the trilogy film was released in 1963 as Au coeur de la vie (In the Midst of Life).

Famed jazz drummer Kenny Clarke was among the musicians for the film, and contributed the drum solo accompaniment to Farquhar's escape through the forest.

== Twilight Zone airing ==
"An Occurrence at Owl Creek Bridge"
- The Twilight Zone episode
- Episode no.: Season 5 Episode 22
- Original air date: February 28, 1964

Episode chronology
← Previous "Spur of the Moment"	Next → "Queen of the Nile"
- The Twilight Zone (1959 TV series) (season 5)

On February 28, 1964, three years after its production, the film was shown on American television as an episode of the fifth season of the fantasy/science fiction show The Twilight Zone. During the episode's introduction, Rod Serling explains how the film was shot overseas and later picked up to air as part of The Twilight Zone. Serling's introduction is as follows, delivered while sitting on a soundstage next to a movie camera:

Tonight, a presentation so special and unique that for the first time in the five years we've been presenting The Twilight Zone, we're offering a film shot in France by others. Winner of the Cannes Film Festival of 1962, as well as other international awards, here is a haunting study of the incredible from the past master of the incredible, Ambrose Bierce. Here is the French production of "An Occurrence at Owl Creek Bridge."

Serling's closing narration states:

An occurrence at Owl Creek Bridge, in two forms: as it was dreamed ... and as it was lived and died. This is the stuff of fantasy, the thread of imagination ... the ingredients of the Twilight Zone.

== Awards ==
- 1962 Cannes Film Festival: Best Short Subject
- 1963 Academy Award, Best Live Action Short Film

== Preservation ==
An Occurrence at Owl Creek Bridge was preserved by the Academy Film Archive in 2012. The Twilight Zone version of the episode has also been included on the show's various DVD and Blu-ray releases.

== See also ==
- Spur of the Moment, the previous episode in the Twilight Zone airing
- Queen of the Nile, the next episode

== Sources ==
- Zicree, Marc Scott (1982). The Twilight Zone Companion. New York: Bantam. ISBN 0-553-01416-1.
- Barrett, Gerald R. (1973). From Fiction to Film: An Occurrence at Owl Creek Bridge. Encino, CA: Dickenson Publishing. ISBN 978-0-822100-83-6.
- DeVoe, Bill. (2008). Trivia from The Twilight Zone. Albany, GA: Bear Manor Media. ISBN 978-1-59393-136-0
- Grams, Martin. (2008). The Twilight Zone: Unlocking the Door to a Television Classic. Churchville, MD: OTR Publishing. ISBN 978-0-9703310-9-0
