= Snowing (band) =

American Midwest emo band

- Origin: Lehigh Valley and Philadelphia, Pennsylvania, U.S.
- Genres: Midwest emo; post-hardcore; math rock
- Years active: 2008–2011; 2016; 2019; 2022; 2025–present
- Labels: Count Your Lucky Stars; Square of Opposition
- Spinoff of: Street Smart Cyclist
- Members: Willow Brazuk; Chris Diehm; Nate Dionne; John Galm; Justin "JR" Renninger
- Past members: Brian "Bean" Baksa
- Website: www.snowingtheband.com

Snowing is an American Midwest emo band from Lehigh Valley and Philadelphia in Pennsylvania. Composed of bassist and vocalist John Galm, guitarists Nate Dionne and Willow Brazuk, and drummer Justin Renninger, the band formed in 2008 and dissolved in 2011. Despite their brief career, they played a key role in the Midwest emo–influenced emo revival movement that flourished during the early-to-late 2010s. Snowing has since reunited for a brief 2019 tour of Japan and three one-off shows: two in 2016 and one in 2022. They again returned in 2025, going on a support tour with Bear vs. Shark, as well as playing festivals and one-off shows.

== History ==
After the break up of Street Smart Cyclist, Galm, Dionne and Brazuk joined and formed Snowing in 2008 in Lehigh Valley and Philadelphia, while Galm worked as a movie theater projectionist with Square of Opposition Records label manager Chris Regec. The band released their first extended play, Fuck Your Emotional Bullshit, in 2009 via Square Of Opposition Records. In 2010, the band released their first and only full-length album via Count Your Lucky Stars Records and Square of Opposition Records titled I Could Do Whatever I Wanted If I Wanted.

In 2011, Snowing announced they were breaking up. In a statement released by the band on their Facebook page, they stated "Snowing has come to an end at the ripe old age of 3 and a half (that's over 90 in emo years!).... We had a blast writing songs, driving across the country playing shows, imbibing copious amounts of alcohol, and earning future grey hairs by reading all about ourselves on message boards. Thanks for everything." The band broke up following its first and only full US tour with its last ever show selling out in a matter of minutes. The band reunited in 2016 for two shows, one for the World Is a Beautiful Place & I Am No Longer Afraid to Die's Broken World Fest in Pittsburgh, the second for Square of Opposition Records' 15th anniversary. The band said that these would be their final shows. However, the band reunited in 2019 for a brief tour in Japan. Also in 2019, guitarist Brazuk made a post on the band's Facebook page announcing that she had come out as a transgender woman and changed her name to Willow. In 2022, Snowing announced a one time reunion show at the Ukrainian American Citizens' Association (Ukie Club) for 4333 Collective's DIY Superbowl fest along with Oolong, Short Fictions, Ugli, and Lisa on August 27, 2022. All proceeds from the show were donated to the Trevor Project and the Transgender Legal Defense Fund.

In 2025 Snowing announced a tour opening for Bear vs. Shark, officially reuniting for their first tour since 2019.

== Musical style ==
Snowing are known for their "hollered" vocals, with lyrics have been described as "musings on death and despair and drinking too much". Bassist, vocalist and lyricist John Galm has said the band's early lyrics are "almost like a diary". The band's compositions have been described as "explosive anthems of suburban stagnation as short and ferocious as the band’s career". Spin said Snowing "push beyond emo's characteristic melancholy and opt for full-on apathy" and that "the band [experimented] with meticulous math rock structures that distract from atonal vocals and vaguely threatening lyricism [...] that peculiar brashness is intentional".

== Legacy ==
Snowing has been referred to as "the favourite band of your favourite emo revival bands”. The band developed a cult following after their breakup during the explosion and revival of emo into its fourth wave.

== Band members ==
- John Galm – bass, vocals
- Chris Diehm - guitar
- Nate Dionne – guitar
- Willow Brazuk – guitar
- Justin "JR" Renninger – drums

=== Past members ===
- Brian "Bean" Baksa - drums

== Discography ==
=== Studio albums ===
- I Could Do Whatever I Wanted, If I Wanted (2010, Count Your Lucky Stars & Square Of Opposition Records)

=== EPs ===
- Fuck Your Emotional Bullshit (2009, Square Of Opposition Records)

=== Singles ===
- Tour Tape (2009, Square Of Opposition Records)
- Pump Fake / Scherbatsky (2012, Square Of Opposition Records)

=== Splits ===
- 1994! / Snowing / Boys and Sex / Algernon Cadwallader – Summer Singles (2009, Slow Growth Records)

=== Compilations ===
- 75:24 (2009, Ticklebutt Records & Soft City Records)
- Count Your Lucky Stars Sampler #4 (2012, Count Your Lucky Stars)
- Fuck Off All Nerds: A Benefit Compilation In Memory Of Mitch Dubey (2012, Topshelf Records)
- That Time I Sat in a Pile Of Chocolate (2016, Square of Opposition Records)
- Everything (2016, Waterslide Records)
