= The Wages of Fear (album) =

Studio album by Tellison
- Released: 13 June 2011
- Recorded: Summer 2010 in the Scottish Borders and Hammersmith, London.
- Genre: Indie rock
- Label: Naim Edge
- Producer: Peter Miles

Tellison chronology
Contact! Contact! (2007)	The Wages of Fear (2011)	Hope Fading Nightly (2015)

Singles from The Wages of Fear
- 1. "Collarbone" Released: 22 November 2010; 2. "Say Silence (Heaven & Earth)" Released: 6 June 2011

Professional ratings
Review scores
Source	Rating
The 405	9/10 stars
Alter the Press	4.5/5 stars
Punktastic	5/5 stars
Rock Sound	9/10 stars

The Wages of Fear is the second studio album by English indie rock band Tellison. It was released on 13 June 2011 through Naim Edge Records. The album was made available to listen to on SoundCloud on 27 April 2011.

== Track listing ==
No.	Title	Length
1.	"Get On"	4:14
2.	"Say Silence (Heaven & Earth)"	3:11
3.	"Know Thy Foe"	3:28
4.	"Collarbone"	2:41
5.	"Freud Links the Teeth and the Heart"	2:45
6.	"Horses"	3:13
7.	"Rapture"	3:44
8.	"Tell It to Thebes"	4:03
9.	"Letters from Pre-Med"	2:52
10.	"Vermont"	3:50
11.	"Edith"	3:16
12.	"My Wife's Grave Is in Paris"	4:48
