= Bark Your Head Off, Dog =

Studio album by Hop Along
- Released: April 6, 2018
- Recorded: 2017
- Studios: The Headroom (Philadelphia, Pennsylvania)
- Genre: Indie rock
- Length: 40:09
- Label: Saddle Creek
- Producers: Hop Along, Joe Reinhart

Hop Along chronology
Painted Shut (2015)	Bark Your Head Off, Dog (2018)

Professional ratings
Aggregate scores
Source	Rating
AnyDecentMusic?	7.8/10
Metacritic	81/100
Review scores
Source	Rating
AllMusic	4/5 stars
The A.V. Club	B−
DIY	4/5 stars
Drowned in Sound	9/10
Exclaim!	9/10
Pitchfork	8.0/10
The Skinny	4/5 stars
Under the Radar	7/10

Bark Your Head Off, Dog is the fourth studio album by American indie rock band Hop Along, released on April 6, 2018.

== Background and recording ==
Bark Your Head Off, Dog was self-produced and written over the course of 2016 and 2017. It was recorded at The Headroom in Philadelphia during 2017. The Headroom was guitarist Joe Reinhart's home recording studio in Philadelphia.

== Music and lyrics ==
The sound on Bark Your Head Off, Dog has been described as "warmer", "more spacious" and more "vibrantly diverse" than its predecessor. The songwriting has been described as "more focused." Additionally, the album uses more "danceable" rhythms, and its opening track "How Simple" has been called "one of the band's poppiest moments". The album continues the band's usual blend of grunge, punk rock and power pop, and is also said to contain elements of progressive rock, folk rock, and lofi music. The album also makes use of unorthodox instruments such as harps, pizzicato, mandolins, fiddles, electric piano and vocoders.

Guitarist Joe Reinhart utilized "math emo" guitar techniques such as tapping, which drew comparisons to Algernon Cadwallader, his previous band. NPR wrote that the guitarist employed "twinkly, expressive guitar riffs that defined his defunct emo band Algernon Cadwallader and made that music feel unbridled and joyous." Some of the album's guitar rhythms have drawn comparisons to Paramore.

The lyrics on the album have been described as feeling "impressionistic."

== Artwork ==
The album's cover artwork is an abstract landscape portrait painted by frontperson Frances Quinlan.

== Critical reception ==
Bark Your Head Off, Dog was met with "universal acclaim" by critics. At Metacritic, which assigns a weighted average rating out of 100 to reviews from mainstream publications, the release received an average score of 81 based on 14 reviews.

Cole Firth of Exclaim! gave the album a score of 9 out of 10, writing: "Hop Along are the kind of band whose records inspire fierce loyalty and foster deep personal connection, which makes Bark Your Head Off seem like a gamble, given its broader palette. It only takes a few listens to realize that it is really the fulfillment of the band's potential, though. You could have said it after pretty much any of their previous releases, but once again, Hop Along are truly a band at the top of their game." Jayson Greene of Pitchfork gave the album a score of 8 out of 10, writing: "The Philly band’s third album is warm and spacious, filled with rich stories rendered beautifully in the abstract." Will Richards of DIY gave the album four stars out of five, and wrote: "While 'Painted Shut' saw Hop Along forcefully establish themselves as a band to be reckoned with, LP3 shows they’re just as enticing and attention-grabbing when practicing restraint."

Marcy Donelson of AllMusic also gave the album four stars out of five, saying: "While something is almost always askew, on average, the album feels a little broader and brighter than Painted Shut. Thankfully, it does so without sacrificing lyrical impact or smoothing out Hop Along's distinctive, compelling sound." Skye Butchard of The Skinny also gave the album four stars out of five, saying: "Each song here works as its own neat story, told through powerful observations of personal occurrences."

Adam Turner-Heffer of Under the Radar gave the album a more mixed review, awarding it a score of 7 of 10. He said: "Everything about the Philadelphia quartet’s sound on their latest record sounds more accomplished, but also more polished, which takes a little from what made Hop Along such an exciting prospect on previous songs such as 'The Knock.' That jaggedness, however, has been replaced by more focused and considered songwriting, something Quinlan has always shown a clear knack for. [...] Still, one wonders if something exciting went missing in this cleaner direction."

== Track listing ==
No.	Title	Length
1.	"How Simple"	3:48
2.	"Somewhere a Judge"	3:52
3.	"How You Got Your Limp"	2:36
4.	"Not Abel"	4:36
5.	"The Fox in Motion"	3:59
6.	"One That Suits Me"	5:16
7.	"What the Writer Meant"	4:07
8.	"Look of Love"	6:12
9.	"Prior Things"	5:43

== Charts ==
Chart performance for Bark Your Head Off, Dog
Chart (2018)	Peak position
US Heatseekers Albums (Billboard)	2
US Independent Albums (Billboard)	9

== Personnel ==
- Frances Quinlan - vocals, guitar
- Mark Quinlan - drums
- Tyler Long - bass
- Joe Reinhart - guitar
