= Contact! Contact! =

Studio album by Tellison
- Released: 14 May 2007
- Recorded: August 2006 – January 2007 at Bankhead Farm, Fife, Scotland; and Perry Vale, London, England
- Genre: Indie rock
- Length: 47:15
- Label: Gravity DIP, Banquet
- Producer: Robin Sutherland; Nicolaas Weststeyn

Tellison chronology
Tellison EP (2006)	Contact! Contact! (2007)	The Wages of Fear (2011)

Singles from Contact! Contact!
- 1. "Reader" Released: 6 February 2006; 2. "Henry Went to Paris" Released: 2 August 2007; 3. "Gallery" Released: 26 November 2007

Professional ratings
Review scores
Source	Rating
Alternative Ulster	4/5 stars
Kerrang!	4/5 stars
Rockfeedback	5/5 stars
Rock Sound	(9/10)

Contact! Contact! is the debut studio album by English indie rock band Tellison, initially released on 14 May 2007 on Gravity DIP Records. It was later re-released on 12 November 2007 on Banquet Records.

The album was recorded over a six-month period between Scotland and England with two producers, Robin Sutherland and Nicolaas Weststeyn.

== Track listing ==
All lyrics written by Stephen Davidson; music composed by Tellison.

No.	Title	Length
1.	"Hanover Start Clapping"	2:42
2.	"Reader"	2:44
3.	"Gallery"	4:17
4.	"Tender Is the Night"	3:54
5.	"Fire"	2:59
6.	"New York City, New York"	3:40
7.	"Amory"	2:35
8.	"Ambulance"	2:59
9.	"Architects"	4:39
10.	"Henry Went to Paris"	3:46
11.	"Disaster! Disaster!"	3:40
12.	"Hospital" (contains an untitled hidden track, a cover of "Song 1" by defunct Derby band Cable.)	13:02

== Release history ==
Country	Date	Label	Format	Catalogue #	Ref.
United Kingdom	14 May 2007	Gravity DIP Records	Compact Disc, Digital Download	DIP036	
United Kingdom	12 November 2007	Banquet Records	Compact Disc, Digital Download	BANQUET002	

== Personnel ==
The following personnel contributed to Contact! Contact!:

=== Tellison ===
- Stephen H Davidson – lead vocals, rhythm guitar, lyrics
- Peter J Phillips – lead guitar, vocals, keyboards
- Andrew J Tickell – bass guitar, backing vocals
- Henry S Danowski – drums, percussion, keyboards

=== Additional musicians ===
- Al Brown – violin

=== Production ===
- Robin Sutherland – producer
- Nicolaas Weststeyn – co-producer
- Pat Collier – mixing
- Kimberley Rosen – mastering
- Alex Curtis – artwork, design
