= Heart Tattoo =

Song by Joyce Manor

from the album Never Hungover Again
- Released: July 14, 2014
- Length: 1:50
- Label: Epitaph
- Songwriters: Barry Johnson; Matt Ebert; Chase Knobbe; Kurt Walcher
- Producer: Joe Reinhart

"Heart Tattoo" is a song by American rock band Joyce Manor from their third studio album, Never Hungover Again (2014). It is a clear homage to Blink-182, one of the band's biggest influences. Written by frontman Barry Johnson, the track marked a creative turning point in developing its parent album. Lyrically, the song uses the act of getting a tattoo as a metaphor for youthful impulse, permanence, and regret.

Upon release, "Heart Tattoo" was widely praised by critics for its concise songwriting and buoyant pop-punk energy, and later received public endorsement from Blink-182 bassist Mark Hoppus, who joined the band to perform the song live in 2024.

== Background ==
The writing process for Never Hungover Again, the band's third album, initially produced several songs that frontman Barry Johnson dismissed, citing weak hooks despite solid lyrics. Writing the album reached a turning point when the band developed "Heart Tattoo". The song is a clear homage to Blink-182, one of Johnson's first influences. Johnson and guitarist Chase Knobbe first had met online and shared an interest in the band. Johnson has called Blink bassist Mark Hoppus "one of the finest American songwriters ever." Bassist Matt Ebert performs backing vocals on the song in a style reminiscent of Blink singer Tom DeLonge.

Through "Heart Tattoo", the band explores the allure of tattoos as symbols of permanence and personal consequence, framed through teenage error. Johnson wrote the song from the perspective of a young person who gets a tattoo solely for catharsis, and examines the potential for regret from this impulse. CBS LA described the song as "pop-punk stormer" in the vein of Lifetime or Dillinger Four. Al Horner of NME characterized the track as reminiscent of Green Day, while Grace Robins-Somerville of Paste likened it to the work of Weezer and its Blue Album. Ian Cohen for The Ringer interpreted the song and its place in pop-punk history: "One could hear “Heart Tattoo” and rightfully place Joyce Manor into a lineage of sweet, smart-ass SoCal punk."

== Reception ==
Contemporary music critics enjoyed "Heart Tattoo". NPR reviewer Lars Gotrich complimented its "pogo-ing rhythm with stuttered, melodic guitar picking." Consequence's Sasha Geffen praised the song for pairing a bright, upbeat guitar progression with its deeper lyrics of insecurity and fear. Tom Walters for DIY enjoyed the song's playful energy and moronic but "addictive" melody. Maura Johnston in The Boston Globe highlighted Ebert's driving bass line and percussionist Kurt Walcher's drumming on the song. Brian Stout of PopMatters viewed it "deceptively brilliant in how it mixes humor and heartbreak." Stereogum's Danielle Chelosky perceived the song as " yearn[ing] for permanence, even if what’s being made permanent is a little stupid." Zoe Camp in Spin extolled it as "perhaps the best example of the band’s unparalleled juggling act between empathy and aggression, condensed down to a simple, cutting symbol (literally)."

Blink-182 bassist Mark Hoppus was appreciative of the song, tweeting an endorsement of it after its release. In December 2024, Hoppus joined Joyce Manor onstage at the Hollywood Palladium to perform the song during the band's anniversary celebration of Never Hungover Again.
