= Tellison =

British indie rock band

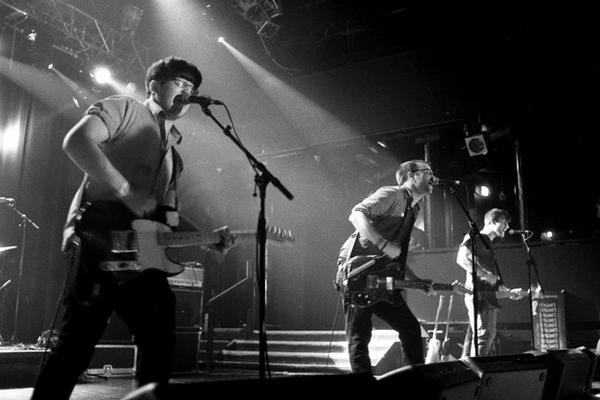
- Tellison performing at the Koko, London in 2008

Background information
- Origin: London, England
- Genre: Indie rock
- Years active: 2000—present
- Labels: Gravity DIP, Banquet, BSM Records, Naim Edge, Alcopop
- Members: Henry Danowski; Stephen Davidson; Peter Phillips; Andrew Tickell
- Website: http://www.tellison.co.uk

Tellison is an English four-piece indie rock band from London, England, formed in 2000. The band consists of lead vocalist and guitarist Stephen Davidson, guitarist and vocalist Peter Phillips, bass guitarist and vocalist Andrew Tickell and drummer Henry Danowski.

They have released three studio albums: Contact! Contact! (2007), The Wages of Fear (2011) and Hope Fading Nightly (2015) as well as two split extended plays and a number of singles. The band have been somewhat secretive as to the origins of their name, revealing only that it is "the surname of a man whose life story is very good".

The band have received exposure from being featured as a recommended artist on Myspace, having their tracks feature on television shows such as The Inbetweeners, Made in Chelsea and Strictly Come Dancing as well as opening for bands including Biffy Clyro, Noah and the Whale, Kevin Devine, Mumford & Sons and Twin Atlantic.

== History ==
=== Formation, early releases and Contact! Contact! (2000-2010) ===
Stephen Davidson first formed an early incarnation of Tellison when he started school in September 2000 with original bass player Rory Andrew. In 2001 Rory introduced drummer Henry Danowski. The three piece went on to release their first split extended play with Northampton band Seven Years on 2 December 2003. The band had been working on recording an album until Rory Andrew left the band in 2005. Later in 2005 Andrew Tickell and Peter Phillips would join the band, with Tickell taking over bass guitar and Phillips on guitar and vocals.

Work began on the album in the summer of 2006, working with Robin Sutherland in Scotland before finishing up in early 2007 with Pat Collier in London. Recording and touring at the time was "a bit of a nightmare" Davidson recalled in an interview as the band were all living in different places, with Phillips at Oxford University, Danowski at university in Boston, America, Davidson in Cambridge and Tickell living in Kingston. The album Contact! Contact! was finally released through Gravity DIP on 14 May 2007. The album was almost immediately of-print, with Banquet Records rereleasing the album later that year on 12 November 2007.

Around the album's release, the band were twice featured as a recommended artist on the front page of Myspace. The band also received continued exposure when their tracks "Gallery" and "Wasp Nest" were both featured in British sitcom The Inbetweeners.

=== The Wages of Fear (2010-2012) ===
The band originally started work on their second album in 2009, however at the time Davidson was in his final year of university whilst the other members were in full-time employment, making it difficult for the band to regularly work together. In May 2010 the band began working with different producers on demoing the record, before recording the album with Peter Miles in June. The band previewed new material throughout their October–November UK headline tour, before releasing the first single from the new album, "Collarbone" on 22 November 2010. The single was released through Big Scary Monsters Recording Company, who would also release the track "Edith Wharton" on their end of year compilation. On 10 March 2011 the band announced that their sophomore album The Wages of Fear would be released from Naim Edge.

Due to someone within the music press illegally leaking an unfinished version of the album, the decision was made to make the complete album available to stream on 28 April 2011. Second single "Say Silence (Heaven & Earth)" was released on 5 June 2011, with the album released the following week on 13 June 2011. The Wages of Fear was positively received by critics, praising the band's shift towards writing more intelligent indie rock. The band began their seventeen date headline tour in support of the album, before releasing third single "Edith" on 10 October 2011 which was supported by a further thirteen date headline tour of the United Kingdom. The track was also featured in the reality television show Made in Chelsea.

On 9 December 2011 the band released a standalone Christmas single titled "Good Luck It's Christmas". The pay what you want single was in support of the charity Campaign Against Living Miserably and was subsequently played on Radio 1. The final single from the album, "Freud Links The Teeth & The Heart" was released on 28 May 2012. The band went on a small tour in May before playing a number of festivals over the summer months, including: Truck Festival, 2000trees, Southsea Fest and Play Fest.

In late 2012 the band decided to remaster and reissue their out-of-print debut album Contact! Contact!, marking the fifth anniversary of its original release. Naim Edge rereleased the record on 3 December 2012, with the band performing the album in its entirety across a small tour. After finishing their record deal with Naim Edge in 2012, the band returned to their jobs outside of Tellison.

=== Hope Fading Nightly (2013-present) ===
The band first began working on new material in June 2012. After attempts to sign a new record-deal proved fruitless, the band decided to self finance the sessions. Recording the album with producer Andy Jenkin began in November 2013. The sessions were drawn out over the following year, with the band fitting recording around their other jobs. The sessions also included the band's longtime touring guitarist Richard Peter Snapes for the first time, although Snapes left Tellison upon the album's completion in order to concentrate on his career as a baker. In August 2014 the band supported Kevin Devine on his tour of the United Kingdom, previewing new material.

The first single from the sessions titled "Tact Is Dead" premiered on 4 March 2015. It was also announced that the band had signed to Alcopop! Records. Second single "Boy" premiered on the Radio 1 Rock show on 12 April 2015 before being released as a free download on 2 July 2015 along with announcement that the band's third album was titled Hope Fading Nightly. Over the summer months of 2015 the band performed at Hit The Deck Festival, 2000 Trees Festival, Truck Festival and Y Not Festival.

== Band members ==
Current members

- Stephen Davidson – lead vocals, guitar (2000–present)
- Peter Phillips – backing vocals, occasional lead vocals, guitar (2005–present)
- Andrew Tickell – bass, backing vocals (2005–present)
- Henry Danowski – drums, percussion, programming (2001–present)

Former touring members

- Richard Peter Snapes – guitar, keyboards, backing vocals (2011–14)
- Matthew Roberts – guitar, keyboards, backing vocals (2008–10)
- Benjamin J Wood – guitar, keyboards, backing vocals (2007-2008)

Former members

- Rory Andrew – bass, backing vocals (2000–05)

== Discography ==
Studio Albums

- Contact! Contact! (2007)
- The Wages of Fear (2011)
- Hope Fading Nightly (2015)

Extended Plays

- Tellison (2006)

Splits

- Tellison / Sevenyears (Split with Sevenyears) (2003)
- Tellison / Tubelord (Split with Tubelord) (2008)

Remix Albums

- Contact! Contact! Remixed (2009)

Singles

Year	Title	Chart	Label	Album
2005	"Reader"	—	Gravity DIP	Contact! Contact!
2007	"Henry Went To Paris"	—	New Slang Records	Contact! Contact!
2007	"Gallery"	—	Banquet Records	Contact! Contact!
2007	"Wasp Nest"	—	Banquet Records	Standalone single
2010	"Collarbone"	—	Big Scary Monsters	The Wages of Fear
2011	"Say Silence (Heaven & Earth)"	—	Naim Edge	The Wages of Fear
2011	"Edith"	—	Naim Edge	The Wages of Fear
2011	"Good Luck It's Christmas"	—	Naim Edge	Standalone single
2012	"Freud Links The Teeth & The Heart"	—	Naim Edge	The Wages of Fear
2013	"Snow (Don't Tell the Truth This Christmas"	—	Self-released	Standalone single
2015	"Tact is Dead"	—	Alcopop! Records	Hope Fading Nightly
2015	"Boy"	—	Alcopop! Records	Hope Fading Nightly
2015	"Wrecker"	—	Alcopop! Records	Hope Fading Nightly
