= Illawarra Folk Festival =

Festival in New South Wales, Australia

The Illawarra Folk Festival started in 1985 in Jamberoo, New South Wales. It has grown to become one of the largest festivals in Australia run entirely by volunteers from the Illawarra Folk Club Inc.

In 2007, the festival relocated to Bulli. Held in mid-January over the course of four days, The festival has expanded to present approximately 170 performers on 13 stages. It is one of the largest festivals in Australia run entirely by volunteers.

== Features ==
The festival program includes workshops, folk school activities, dance events, poetry sessions and craft stalls. The Music Train brings visitors from Sydney who are serenaded on the journey to Bulli.

The festival incorporates the Illawarra region's multicultural and working-class traditions.

== History ==
The festival is run by the Illawarra Folk Club which formed in 1980 and has had various locations around Wollongong for its concerts, including:

- Coniston Hotel (first venue)
- Wollongong Tennis Club
- Bridge Theatre, Coniston
- Faces On Crown
- Wongawilli Community Hall
- Illawarra Leagues Club
- Illawarra Performing Arts Centre
- Fraternity Club
- Shellharbour Bowling Club
- Kembla Grange Golf Club
- Jamberoo Valley Lodge
- Mount Kembla Hotel
- Lysaghts Bowling Club
- The Ukrainian Club
- City Diggers Wollongong (current main venue)

The Folk Club draws its membership generally from the Illawarra region of New South Wales, Australia. It has presented the Illawarra Folk Festival at Jamberoo from 1985/86-2006 and at Bulli from 2007 to 2020, resuming in 2022. One folk festival was organised in 1985 at Wilton in association with the NSW Folk Federation and Bankstown Folk Club.

Club presidents have included:

- Alan Musgrove
- Kevin Baker
- Vince Brophy
- Anne Fox
- Peter Williams
- Peter Kerr
- Roger Fleming
- Russell Hannah

=== Illawarra Folk Festival directors have been ===
- Chris Cartledge (1986–1990)
- John Harpley (1991–1995)
- David De Santi (1996 to 2009)
- David De Santi (from 2009 as artistic director)
- Neil Rowsell (from 2009 as Project Manager)
- Cody Munroe Moore(from 2022)

=== Honorary life members ===
- Anne Fox +
- Mairi Petersen
- George Petersen +
- John Harpley
- Marie Harpley
- Dot Roberts
- Henry Roberts +
- Russell Hannah
- Bev Hannah
- David De Santi
- Tania De Santi
- Kevin Baker +
- Tony Foley
- Peter Butler +
- Yvonne Butler
- Graeme Morrison

+ deceased

The club has also organised special folk music related tours over the years:

- 1989 Kuranda National Folk Festival Tour through northern NSW and Queensland
- 1990 Adelaide National Folk Festival Tour via the Grampians, Murray River (houseboats) and the Great Ocean Road
- 1994 Bushranger Tour to central NSW - Forbes, Eugowra, Carcoar
- 2006 Tin Hare Tour to Cowra, Young
- 2009 to 2013 Snowy Mountains of Music Festival

As of 2015, it spawned a fringe festival of activist street brass bands known as HONK! Oz, taking place in the nearby city of Wollongong. A number of bands from this fringe festival were also billed at Illawarra Folk Festival the following week.
