= Likewise, Inc. =

Tech startup for content recommendations

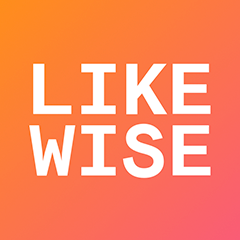
- Type: Startup Company
- Industry: Entertainment; Social Network
- Founded: 2017; 9 years ago
- Founder: Larry Cohen; Ian Morris; Michael Dix
- Headquarters: Bellevue, Washington
- Area served: United States; Canada
- Number of employees: Approximately 35 (2020)
- Website: www.likewise.com

Likewise, Inc., is an American technology startup company which provides a social networking service for finding and saving content recommendations for movies, TV shows, books, and podcasts. A team of ex-Microsoft employees founded Likewise in October 2017 with financial investment from Microsoft co-founder Bill Gates.

The company is led by CEO Ian Morris and as of 2020 had a team of about 35 employees. Its headquarters operates in Bellevue, Washington. As of July 2020, 1 million users had joined the platform.

== History ==
=== Ideation (October 2017) ===
In 2017, former Microsoft Communications Chief Larry Cohen came up with the idea for Likewise in Bill Gates’ private office, Gates Ventures. Cohen currently serves as Gates Ventures’ CEO and managing partner.

Cohen collaborated with colleagues Michael Dix and Ian Morris to co-found what would become Likewise, with Morris as its CEO. Gates funded the company's early development.

The company developed its platform in stealth mode before launching publicly in October 2018.

=== Release (October 2018) ===
Likewise officially released its platform in the US and Canada on October 3, 2018.

=== Growth (2020 COVID-19 pandemic) ===
Likewise experienced accelerated growth alongside the COVID-19 pandemic. From March 2020 to July 2020, the platform's monthly active users tripled in numbers. The company reached one million users in July 2020.

=== Pix Media (June 2025 - present) ===
In June of 2025, Likewise former chief business officer Josh Epstein led a group of investors who acquired the core technology behind Likewise. The new entity was re-branded as Pix Media, Inc. and later named Epstein as CEO. At the time, Pix Media had more than 8.4 million subscribers.

== Applications ==
=== Mobile ===
Likewise is available as a mobile app for the Android and iOS mobile operating systems. Users receive recommendations from the Likewise algorithm, people they follow, and the Likewise editorial team.

=== Likewise TV ===
In October 2019, the company launched its Apple TV app called Likewise TV. The television app organizes shows across streaming services under one watchlist. On July 20, 2020, Likewise TV expanded to Android TV and Amazon Fire TV users.
