= Details of a Sunset =

Short story about a catastrophic event

- Short story by Vladimir Nabokov
- Original title: Катастрофа
- Translator: 1. Vladimir Nabokov
- Language: Russian
- Genre(s): Short story

Publication
- Publication date: 1924
- Published in English: January 1976

"Details of a Sunset" (Russian: Катастрофа, Katastrofa, transl. "Catastrophe") is a short story by Vladimir Nabokov written in Russian under his pen name Vladimir Sirin in Berlin in 1924.

== Summary ==
A man, Mark Standfuss, celebrates his love for his "russet-haired" fiancé, Klara. While at work one day, Klara's mother informs Mark's mother that Klara's ex-boyfriend has come back into town and that Klara has again fallen in love with him and no longer wants to see Mark. Mark, leaving work and deciding to go straight to Klara's (after a brief visit to a pub), happily reflects on a sunset's beautiful transformation of the city in which he lives. He ends up being hit by a tram, which Nabokov plays off as a near-miss. Hallucinatory events that follow reveal that Mark is, in fact, bandaged in a hospital room, about to die. His last thought is "Why isn't Klara here?", after which he departs "whither--into what other dreams, none can tell."
