= The Beautiful Suit =

- Short story by H. G. Wells
- Original title: A Moonlight Fable
- Country: United Kingdom
- Language: English
- Genre: Fiction

Publication
- Publisher: Collier's Weekly
- Publication date: 1909

"The Beautiful Suit" is a short story by H. G. Wells, originally published under the title "A Moonlight Fable" in the April 10, 1909, number of Collier's Weekly. Written in the manner of Hans Christian Andersen's fairy tales, the story features but two characters: an unnamed "little man", and his mother. The mother has made "a beautiful suit of clothes" for the man, who takes inordinate delight in this possession.

== Plot summary ==
Though he longs to "wear it everywhere", the little man's mother insists that he may wear his suit only "on rare and great occasions. It was his wedding-suit, she said." She covers up various parts (buttons, cuffs, elbows, "and wherever the suit was most likely to come to harm") to protect them. The little man wears it as such to church, but he is "full" of the "wild desire" to wear it free of "all these restrictions his mother set."

One evening the uncommon quality of the moonlight inspires him, "terribly afraid, but glad, glad", to put on his suit without any of its protections. He opens his bedroom window and climbs "down to the garden path below." There, in a "night warmer than any night had ever been" and in a strangely exalted natural setting, he walks through the plants (some of them night-blooming and fragrant); night stock, nicotine, white mallow, southern-wood, lavender, and mignonette are mentioned. He goes through "the great hedge", regardless of "the thorns of the brambles" and "burs and goosegrass and havers" because "he knew it was all part of the wearing for which he had longed." He even wades "to his shoulders" through "the duck-pond, or at least . . . what was the duck-pond by day." Reaching the "high-road", and is a joined by a "dim moth" that comes closer and closer, "until at last its velvet wings just brushed his lips...." The next morning the little man is found "dead, with his neck broken, in the bottom of the stone pit", but wearing "a face of such happiness that, had you seen it, you would have understood indeed how that he had died happy, never knowing that cool and streaming silver for the duckweed in the pond."
