= Algernon Cadwallader =

American Midwest emo band

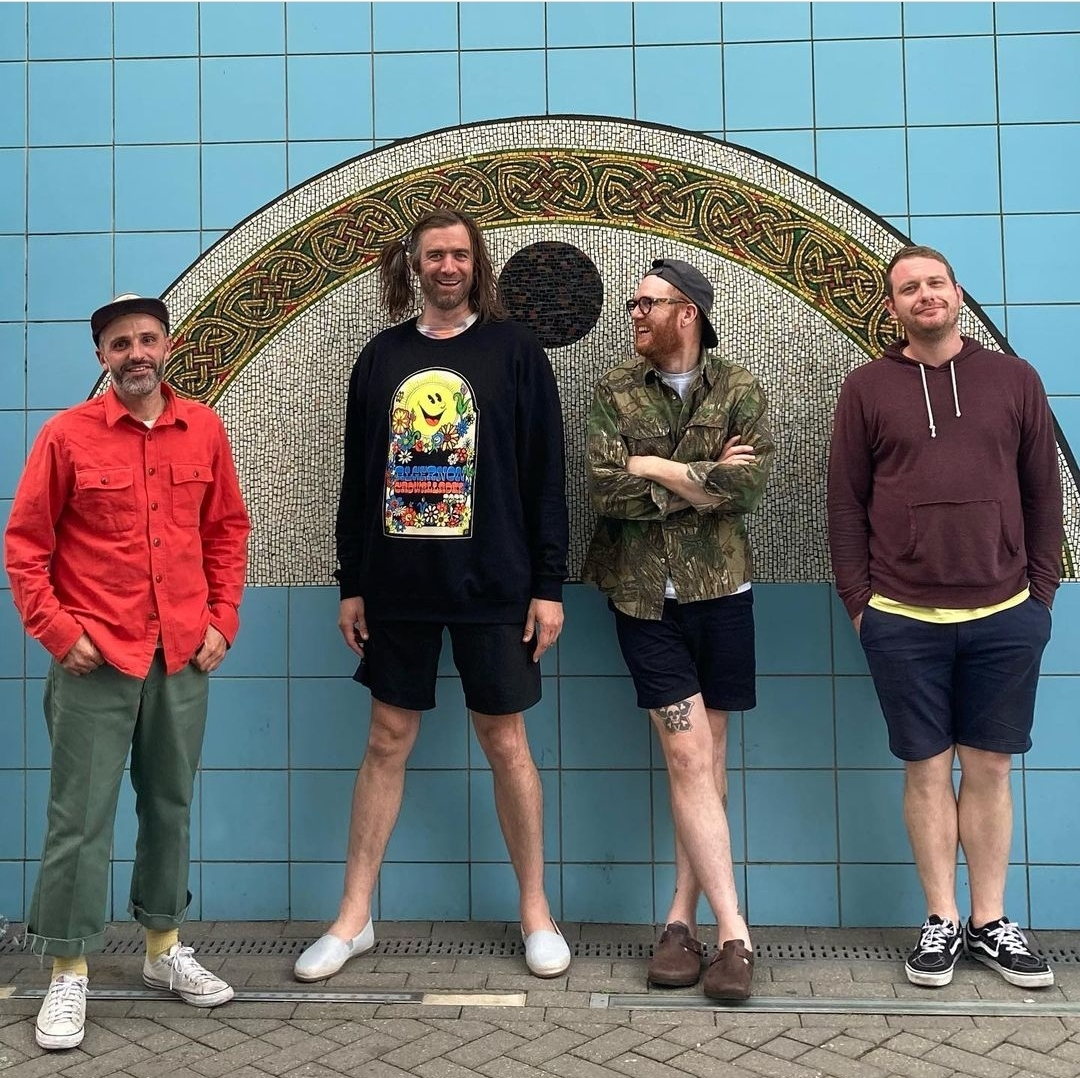
- From left to right: Peter Helmis, Joe Reinhart, Nick Tazza, and Colin Mahony

Background information
- Origin: Yardley, Pennsylvania, U.S.
- Genres: Midwest emo; math rock; post-hardcore
- Years active: 2005–2012; 2022–present
- Labels: Saddle Creek; Lauren; Asian Man; Hot Green; Big Scary Monsters; Protagonist
- Members: Peter Helmis; Joe Reinhart; Colin Mahony; Nick Tazza
- Past members: Tank Bergman
- Website: http://www.algernoncadwallader.com

Algernon Cadwallader is an American Midwest emo and math rock band from Yardley, Pennsylvania. They were originally active from 2005 to 2012. In 2022, the band regrouped and began touring again. Stereogum referred to the band as the "heroes of the emo revival".

== History ==
=== Original formation, music, and breakup (2005–2012) ===
Peter Helmis, Joe Reinhart, and Colin Mahony met in Pennsbury High School and formed the precursor to Algernon Cadwallader, Halfway to Holland, with their friend TJ DeBlois (drummer of metalcore band A Life Once Lost) in 2001. The lineup was Helmis and Reinhart on guitars with Mahony on bass and Helmis on vocals as well. While the band was short lived, only releasing a demo and a self-titled album before breaking up in 2004, it continues to have a cult following to this day. Helmis went on to various solo and duo acts, while Mahony and Reinhart formed another band, Like Lions, with fellow schoolmates. Reinhart and Mahony's collaboration with Like Lions was short lived due to musical differences, and they subsequently reached out to Helmis and friend Nick Tazza (from Ape Up!) to form Algernon Cadwallader in 2005. The band was named for the first mayor of Yardley.

The line up changed with Helmis still on vocals but switching bass with Mahony, now on rhythm guitar. A four song demo was released in 2006, with more of a heavy influence from the math-rock/Midwest emo genre, than their previous project. Lyrical content however, was a more upbeat, happy musings of personal experiences or day to day life, than the darker, more somber tones the emo genre had been known for. They released their first full-length album in 2008 titled Some Kind Of Cadwallader. Up until this point, shows mainly consisted of Philadelphia basements and house shows, with small tours to neighboring cities. Tazza left the band in early 2008 and was replaced with Matt "Tank" Bergman from US Funk Team. Mahony left the band later in 2008 and Algernon became a trio, choosing not to replace Mahony.

The trio toured throughout America and a European leg. In 2009, they released the Fun EP through Protagonist Music, followed by their second full-length album in 2011 titled Parrot Flies. In 2012, the band had been "laid to rest."

=== Post-breakup (2012–2022) ===
In 2014, Reinhart, Helmis and Tazza, along with guitarist Nate Dionne of the band Snowing formed Dogs on Acid, who released one eponymous album in 2015.

In 2018, Algernon Cadwallader re-issued their albums to digital streaming services for the first time. The re-issue contained what the band referred to as their "third LP", a compilation of their 2006 demo, the 2009 Fun EP and several b-sides and covers of instrumental Beatles and Beach Boys songs, "some of it we decided to record and put vocals on it.”

Algernon Cadwallader has been herald for emo-revival in the mid 2000s and has consistently been praised for their math rock arrangements consisting of alternative tunings and off-time rhythm, earning spots on several "top lists" of emo bands.

Reinhart went on to join Philadelphia indie rock band Hop Along and well as creating Philadelphia based recording studio, Headroom Studios. Helmis continued with other bands such as Peter the Piano Eater, Yankee Bluff, and Peter & Craig.

=== Reunion (2022–present) ===
On June 1, 2022, the band – at the time consisting of all previous members – announced a North American reunion tour.

After the success of their North American tour, Algernon Cadwallader announced two New Year's Eve shows at Philadelphia's Johnny Brenda's.

In 2023, the band, now consisting of the four founding members - Helmis, Reinhart, Mahony and Tazza - announced several tours. On January 19, 2023, a headlining Japan tour was announced for April 2023 followed by a Europe/UK in June 2023. On September 20, they announced an American Southwest tour for November 2023, while also playing festivals in Seattle and Philadelphia.

On December 28, 2023, they released a cover of "Mad World" by Tears for Fears in support of the ongoing Palestinian relief effort. The cover was in collaboration with Kinsella + Pulse, Theo Katsaounis and Bryce Pulaski with 100% of proceeds going to Palestinian Red Crescent Society.

They released their new single, "Hawk", on August 5, 2025. Their third album, Trying Not to Have a Thought, was released on 12 September, 2025, via Saddle Creek to critical acclaim.

== Musical style and influence ==
Algernon Cadwallader's music has been described as emo and math rock. They cite Cap'n Jazz and The Beatles as influences. According to Ian Cohen of Pitchfork, the band "purposefully chose Midwestern emo over other forms of punk and hardcore, a choice that liberated from the professionalism, earnestness, and striving that defines indie rock." According to Rolling Stone, "Algernon Cadwallader ignored emo's present to embrace its roots".

Joe Reinhart's guitar work in the band consisted of finger-tapping, arpeggios, harmonics, hammer-ons and pull-offs, odd time signatures, and capoed chord progressions. The band's debut full-length album Some Kind of Cadwallader has been described as "technical", and has been noted to take stylistic cues from heavy metal in addition to math rock. The band's second full-length album Parrot Flies has been said to have "foreshadowed" the style of Reinhart's future contributions in the Philadelphia indie rock band Hop Along. Some of the album's riffs have drawn comparisons to Pavement.

American musician Yvette Young has cited Algernon Cadwallader as an influence.

== Members ==
- Peter Helmis – vocals, bass guitar (2005–2012, 2022–present)
- Joe Reinhart – guitar, backing vocals (2005–2012, 2022–present)
- Colin Mahony – guitar (2005–2008, 2022–present)
- Nick Tazza – drums (2005–2008, 2022–present)

Past members:

- Tank Bergman – drums (2008–2012, 2022)

== Discography ==
=== Albums ===
- Some Kind of Cadwallader (2008, Be Happy)
- Parrot Flies (2011, Big Scary Monsters)
- What It Is (live album; 2011)
- Trying Not to Have a Thought (2025, Saddle Creek)

=== EPs and singles ===
- Demo (2006)
- Fun (2009)
- Listen To (2009)
- Summer Singles (four-way split with 1994!, Snowing, and Boys and Sex) (2011, Slow Growth)
- Mad World (Tears for Fears cover, 2023)
- "Hawk" (2025, Saddle Creek)

=== Compilations ===
- Algernon Cadwallader (2018)

=== Appearances on other releases ===
- "Life on an Island Summer Compilation Vol. 2 (2010) - Look Down (feat. Hop Along)
- Cover Up (2011) – "This Boy" (The Beatles)
- Fuck Off All Nerds: A Benefit Compilation For Mitch Dubey (2011)
