= Frances Quinlan =

American musician (born 1986)

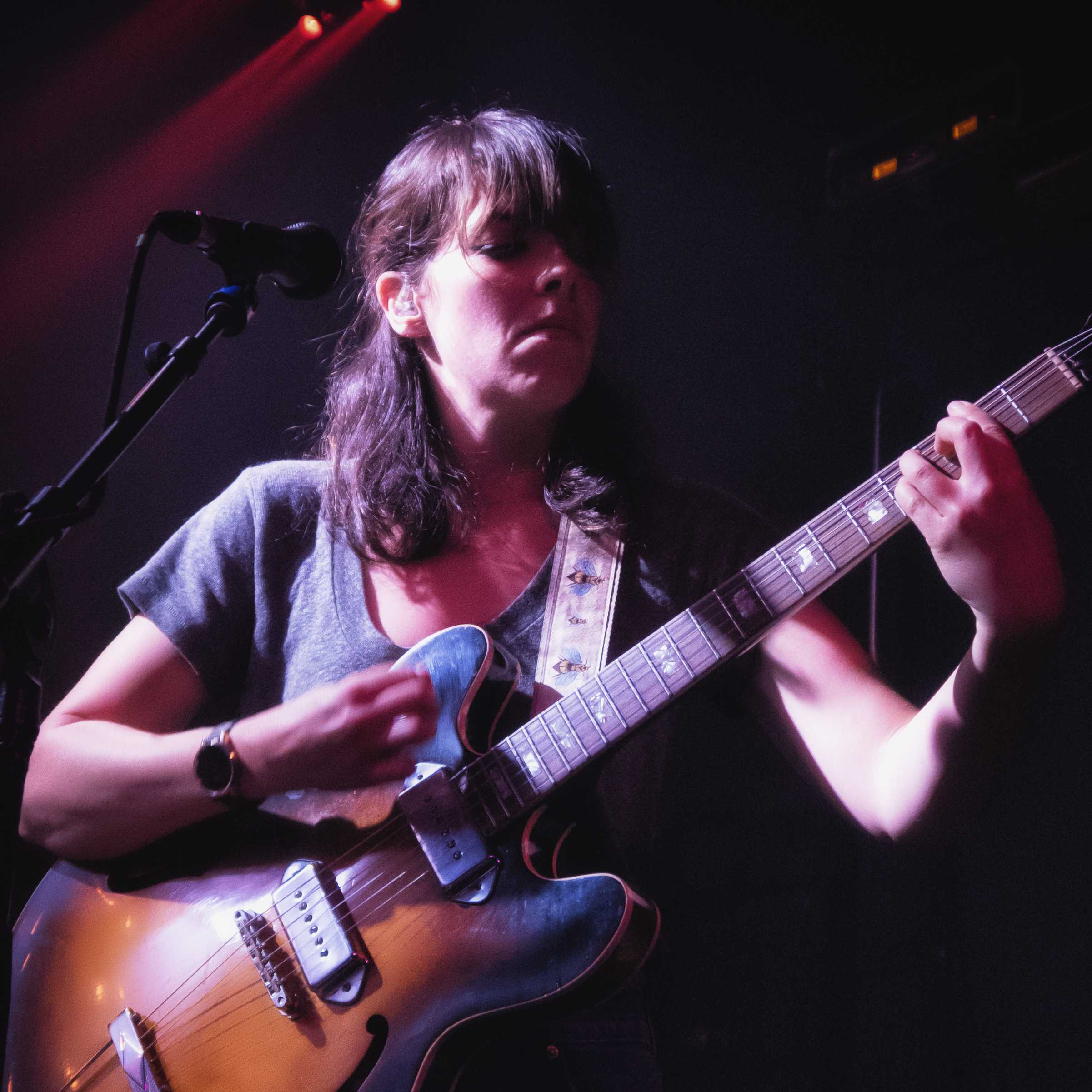
- Quinlan in 2018

Background information
- Born: Christine Frances Quinlan; May 7, 1986 (age 40)
- Origin: New Jersey, U.S. Quakertown, Pennsylvania, U.S.
- Label: Saddle Creek
- Member of: Hop Along

Christine Frances Quinlan (born May 7, 1986) is an American singer-songwriter, guitarist and visual artist best known for fronting Philadelphia indie rock band Hop Along.

Quinlan is primarily recognized for seamlessly alternating between numerous vocal styles, ranging from airy falsetto to raspy singing to outright screaming. Jesse David Fox of Vulture called Quinlan "a rock singer's rock singer". John Wenzel of the Denver Post said "there’s simply nothing else like [Quinlan's voice] in contemporary music." Gabriela Tully Claymore of Stereogum called Quinlan a "national treasure".

== Early life and education ==
Quinlan was raised in northern New Jersey and Quakertown, Pennsylvania, and was an active reader in their youth. Quinlan was encouraged by their mother to create art, and was later encouraged to pursue art as a career by their high school art teacher.

Their parents, whom they have described as "big music fans", introduced them to artists such as Bob Dylan, Cat Stevens, and The Kinks at an early age. They initially attempted to learn to play the electric guitar at age 13, but became frustrated and gave up. However, after their brother Andrew introduced them to musicians such as Ani DiFranco, Fiona Apple, and Lauryn Hill, they revisited the instrument and were more successful. They began songwriting and working on musical projects with their brother. They worked as a house painter during this time.

== Musical career ==
Quinlan began playing shows in Philadelphia through connections made on Myspace and in the punk rock and hardcore punk scenes. Quinlan was then discovered by Mattie Canino of RVIVR and Latterman, who further supported them early in their career. In the mid-2000s, Quinlan began a solo acoustic project in college at Maryland Institute College of Art. During this time, they released their debut EP, Songs of the Sea.

Quinlan recorded their first solo album, Freshman Year, under the name Hop Along, Queen Ansleis, in 2005, between their freshman and sophomore years of college. They distributed the album on burned CDs. After graduation, their other brother, Mark, joined them on drums as they developed the project, which was renamed Hop Along. Hop Along's debut album Get Disowned was released in 2012 to critical acclaim. Hop Along's 2015 studio album Painted Shut was also praised by critics for its "immediacy and emotional depth", led by Quinlan's voice. Quinlan lived in Philadelphia in the mid-2010s, where they wrote the lyrics to the band's fourth album, Bark Your Head Off, Dog.

Quinlan's debut solo album, Likewise was released on January 31, 2020 through Saddle Creek Records. Hop Along guitarist Joe Reinhart appears on the album performing guitar and bass. Quinlan created the album's cover art, as they have done for every prior album released under Hop Along.

Quinlan was scheduled to perform at SXSW in 2020, but this appearance was cancelled due to COVID-19 restrictions.

Quinlan recorded the song "Another Season", which plays through the end credits of the 2024 psychological horror drama film I Saw the TV Glow.

In 2025, Frances Quinlan released Parts Work, an EP recorded with Kyle Pulley, a recording producer on the Hop Along record, Bark Your Head Off, Dog.

== Artistry ==
Numerous publications have made note of the raspy tone of Quinlan's singing voice, as well as their "emotive" vocal delivery, airy falsetto and harsh screams. Spin wrote that their vocal delivery alternates between "tender and savage", and The Denver Post wrote that they employ "sensitive whispers and grunge-worthy howls in the same song, melodic and unhinged and precise and vulnerable all at once." Jayson Greene of Pitchfork said Quinlan "doesn’t have one voice—[they] might have 10" and that attempting to list them "would yield no insight", while loosely describing Quinlan's tone as an algamation of the sounds of a cat, a bugle, Rod Stewart and a motorcycle. Gabriela Tully Claymore of Stereogum said Quinlan's voice "sounds like a gravelly rasp that got run over and then dipped in honey or something." Gregg McQueen of the Aquarian described Quinlan's vocals as "otherworldly" and delineated them as "part rasp, part sweetness, a chameleonic tool that can mutate seamlessly from croon to howl."

Quinlan's voice is also noted for its wide range. Stereogum called Quinlan's voice "scratchy and muscular and resistant in all the right places [...] You can almost hear the blood gurgling in the back of [their] throat as [they] strain to get every word out." Quinlan's vocal melodies have been described as "catchy and experimental." In 2025, Stereogum said Quinlan's vocals "belt with a pack-a-day rasp that somehow never sounds grating and is always on pitch."

Quinlan designates themself as a rhythm guitarist "at the end of the day", claiming to use "odd forms" of chord voicings in their playing. They did not start using a pick to play guitar until 2015.

Quinlan's lyrics often follow a narrative format and range from autobiographical to completely fictional in nature. Arielle Gordon Spin Magazine called Quinlan a "purveyor of fairy tales disguised as charming indie rock". Quinlan themself said "my experience is like a mire of thoughts [...] I cannot compartmentalize at all. Everything is bleeding into each other, it's a mess."

Quinlan is known for their abstract painting style. The album artwork for every Hop Along release thus far has been an original painting created by Quinlan.

Quinlan has cited Björk, Joanna Newsom and Bob Dylan as musical and creative inspirations.

== Personal life ==
Quinlan is non-binary and uses they/them pronouns. They came out through a thread of tweets on January 22, 2021. They revealed that they chose to start going by their middle name after high school in an attempt to distance themselves from a role that they claimed to have never "understood or felt agency with".

Quinlan has stated that they are unsure of how they feel regarding the issue of religion.

In between tours, Quinlan works at a housepainting business owned by their aunt.

Quinlan has expressed their appreciation for ambient music artists such as Brian Eno, saying "for some reason, I’ve just been drawn to music without lyrics — as a lyricist, I don’t know what that is. [...] I like to read to it."

== Discography ==
=== Solo ===
- Likewise (2020)
- Parts Work (2025)

=== Hop Along ===
- Freshman Year
- Get Disowned (2012)
- Painted Shut (2015)
- Bark Your Head Off, Dog (2018)
