= Hop Along =

American indie rock band

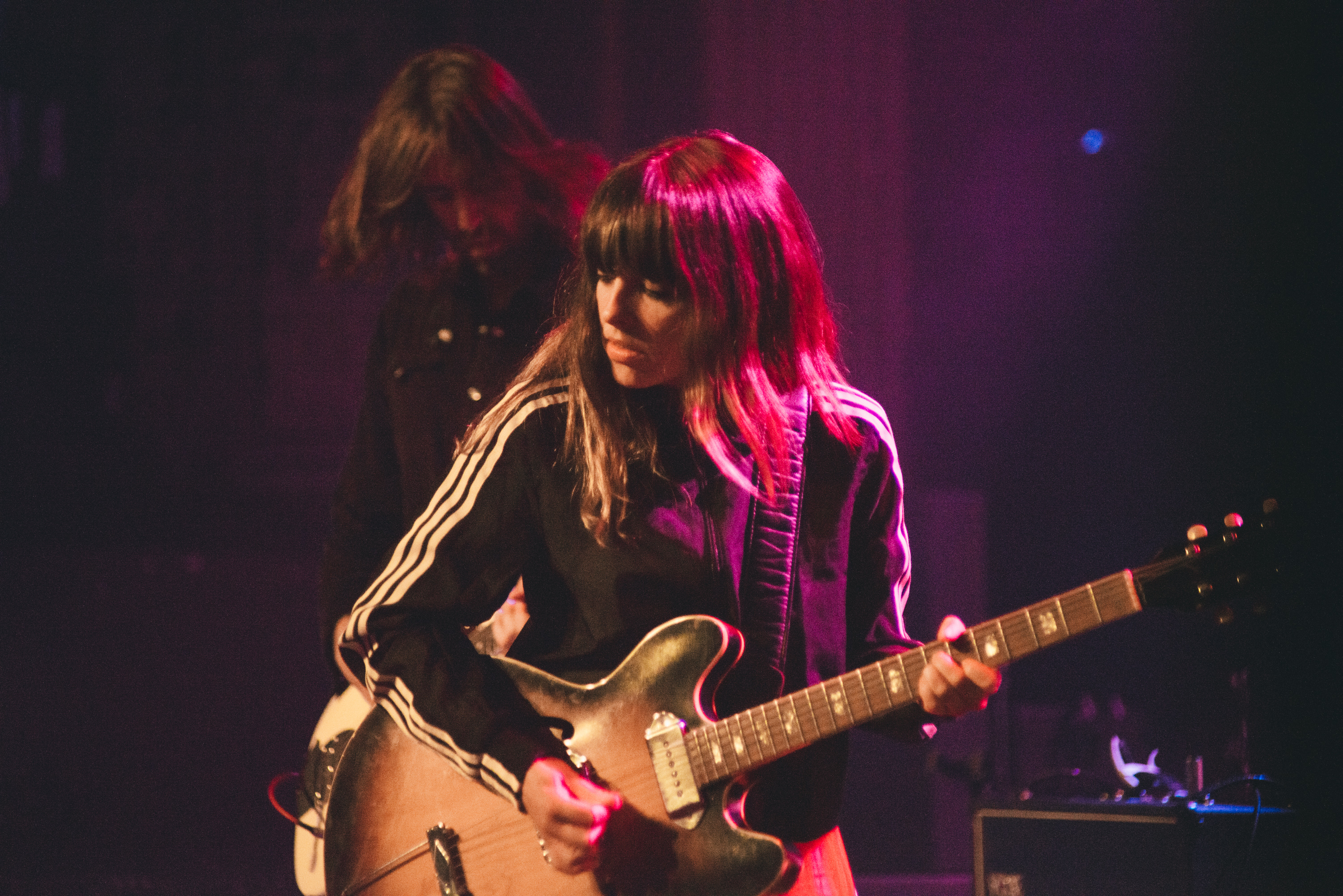
- Hop Along performing in 2019

Background information
- Origin: Philadelphia, Pennsylvania, U.S.
- Genres: Indie rock; indie pop; folk; power pop; emo; freak folk (early)
- Years active: 2005–present
- Labels: Saddle Creek, Hot Green, Salinas, Big Scary Monsters
- Members: Frances Quinlan; Mark Quinlan; Tyler Long; Joe Reinhart
- Past members: Jacki Sulley; Dominic Angelella; Peter Helmis
- Website: www.hopalongtheband.com

Hop Along is an American indie rock band from Philadelphia, Pennsylvania, formerly known as Hop Along, Queen Ansleis.

== History ==
=== Hop Along, Queen Ansleis ===
Hop Along began as an acoustic freak folk solo project known as Hop Along, Queen Ansleis in 2004, during Frances Quinlan's senior year in high school. The name "Hop Along" is derived from a nickname Quinlan received in high school for being a slow walker, and "Queen Ansleis" was derived from the name of the wild flower Queen Anne's lace, which Quinlan intentionally misspelled so it could be the name of a character.

Quinlan released their debut album Freshman Year in the summer of 2005.

Quinlan performed an acoustic solo act for several years as they honed their style, stating "I would envy [full ensembles] because I thought that a band inherently carries more energy than a person does solo. I suppose you could argue that point, but when I was playing by myself it was just out of necessity. I wanted to play and I just couldn’t seem to get a band together. I wanted to write and I didn’t want to wait for anybody."

=== Hop Along ===
Three years after Quinlan's first album, their brother Mark joined the project as drummer, followed by bassist Tyler Long in 2009. As a trio, the band's name was shortened to Hop Along. The group's first release was an EP titled Wretches in 2009, followed by their second full-length album Get Disowned on May 5, 2012. The album was a critical success in the independent music press. Quinlan said they wanted the album to be produced by a friend rather than a stranger. The band approached Joe Reinhart of Algernon Cadwallader, who Quinlan had met through the Philadelphia basement show scene, to produce the album. Reinhart was later added to the band's lineup on lead guitar.

In October 2014, Hop Along signed to indie rock label Saddle Creek Records, which released the band's third full-length record, Painted Shut, on May 4, 2015.

The band toured with Modest Mouse and The War On Drugs in 2015.

On January 22, 2018, the title and tracklisting of the band's fourth full-length record was revealed. The lead single "How Simple" appeared on streaming sites the next day after a postcard vinyl was sent in the mail. The nine-track Bark Your Head Off, Dog was released on April 6, 2018. It was recorded by Joe Reinhart and Kyle Pulley at Headroom Studios.

Hop Along embarked on a US tour of the Midwest and East Coast in the fall of 2021, their first tour since before the COVID-19 pandemic. The tour included a performance with Dr. Dog at the Shelburne Museum in Vermont.

On September 23, 2023, the band announced on X the cancellation of a planned Halloween show with Japanese Breakfast due to "unforeseen circumstances beyond [the band's] control".

== Musical style and influences ==
The staff of Spin have assessed that Hop Along "straddle several genres" and ratified "it’s easy enough to file them away in indie rock without batting an eye". However, the site admitted that the band "derive some of their power from emo". Hence, Hop Along's overall style has been described by AllMusic as "impulsive, punk-injected indie rock". In congruence, Pitchfork said "Hop Along's energy comes from punk but their style is indebted to the romantic, middle-American indie of Bright Eyes and Rilo Kiley." Jezy J. Gray of D Magazine stated that Hop Along "traffics in mid-tempo guitar jams, tender acoustic confessionals and buoyant, hook-driven indie pop". Grant Sharples of Alternative Press said "although Hop Along have plenty of folksy tendencies, emo music sets the groundwork for the group’s songwriting". Chris Gee of Exclaim! described Hop Along's sound as a blend of power pop, folk and emo. Adam Turner-Heffer of Under the Radar described Hop Along's sound as "somewhere between the slippery tags of emo and folk." Frances Quinlan's vocal melodies have been called "downright outrageous, with their tumbling runs, frenetic note jumps and jazzy inflections."

Lyrically, the band is known for the "literary stylings" of frontperson Frances Quinlan. The band's songs often explore topics such as death, loss, poverty and abuse of power. Quinlan has stated: "I don’t ever want to get away from talking about death. I don’t want to be a drag either but I think the only way you can speak honestly is to have it in your mind."

According to Skye Butchard of The Skinny, "Frances Quinlan’s voice has been Hop Along’s not-so-secret weapon since they formed. It scratches, strains, coos and bleats in a way that appears wild and unkempt, but conveying such specificity of emotion that means it couldn’t possibly be accidental." Office Magazine said Quinlan's voice "wields a power that alludes to the strong women preceding her—the raspiness of Janis, the honesty of Fiona Apple and Alanis Morissette—yet is still impossible to define." Drummer Mark Quinlan has a hardcore punk background, and is influenced by grunge and heavy metal music, which he jokingly attributed to "angst and male aggression" and "suburban white male problems". Guitarist Joe Reinhart is said to be stylistically rooted in "math emo" from his previous project, Algernon Cadwallader.

Hop Along's songwriting process is a collaborative effort that involves Quinlan conceiving rough ideas for songs that are later developed and fleshed out by the rest of the band. Quinlan says that some songs evolve into something drasticly different after presenting the initial idea to the band.

== Legacy ==
Pitchfork wrote "If Philadelphia is the capital of indie rock, then Hop Along sits at the table with its top leaders."

== Members ==
Current Members

- Frances Quinlan - vocals, guitar (2005–present)
- Mark Quinlan - drums (2009–present)
- Tyler Long - bass (2009–present)
- Joe Reinhart - guitar (2012–present)

Former members

- Dominic Angelella - guitar (2012)
- Peter Helmis - album layout (2012)
- Jacki Sulley - guitar, keyboard

== Discography ==
=== Studio albums ===
- Freshman Year (as Hop Along, Queen Ansleis) (2005)
- Get Disowned (2012)
- Painted Shut (2015)
- Bark Your Head Off, Dog (2018)

=== EPs ===
- Sympathetic Flypaper (as Hop Along, Queen Ansleis) (2003)
- Songs of The Sea (as Hop Along, Queen Ansleis) (2004)
- Is Something Wrong? (as Hop Along, Queen Ansleis) (2009)
- Wretches (2009)
