= Big Lie (Joyce Manor song) =

Song by Joyce Manor

from the album Million Dollars to Kill Me
- Released: September 21, 2018
- Genre: Power pop; Emo
- Length: 2:44
- Label: Epitaph
- Songwriters: Barry Johnson; Matt Ebert; Chase Knobbe; Pat Ware
- Producer: Kurt Ballou

"Big Lie" is a song by American rock band Joyce Manor from their fifth studio album, Million Dollars to Kill Me (2018). The song, which shares songwriting credits with all members of the band, combines the band's melodic punk sound with power pop influences. Its lyrics juxtapose irony with direct emotional confession, balancing self-deprecating humor with expressions of loneliness and devotion. It was produced by Kurt Ballou.

Although Million Dollars to Kill Me received a more mixed critical reception than the band's earlier releases, "Big Lie" was widely regarded as its standout track. Critics praised its lead guitar work, songwriting, and emotional depth, with several publications identifying it as a highlight. It has become one of Joyce Manor's most-streamed songs, and it has remained the only song from Million Dollars to Kill Me to appear regularly in the band's live performances.

== Background ==
"Big Lie" originated during the writing sessions for Cody (2016) but was ultimately set aside before being revived and completed for Million Dollars to Kill Me two years later. Its arrangement developed out of a jam session, during which drummer Pat Ware jokingly introduced a "funky" drum part that the band ultimately retained. Frontman Barry Johnson remarked that he considered "Big Lie" strong enough to work as a pop song, joking that he would have welcomed the opportunity for Epitaph Records to pitch it to an artist such as Carly Rae Jepsen.

The song and album were produced by Kurt Ballou, best known as the guitarist of Converge, with the band seeking a heavier, harder sound. Guitarist Chase Knobbe credited Ballou with expanding the band's sonic palette without fundamentally altering its style. He said Ballou emphasized subtle atmospheric textures and "implied" harmonic qualities within "Big Lie," helping the song's layered guitar work cohere while retaining its raw energy.

Johnson later noted that "Big Lie" had become one of Joyce Manor's most-streamed songs despite the comparatively mixed reception to Million Dollars to Kill Me upon its release. The song has remained a fixture of Joyce Manor's live performances, and is the only song from Million Dollars to Kill Me to appear regularly in the band's setlists years after the album's release.

== Composition ==
"Big Lie" opens with minimal instrumentation beneath Barry Johnson's subdued vocals, emphasizing the vocal melody in contrast to Joyce Manor's typically guitar-forward sound. The song features a prominent lead guitar riff and a driving bassline that critics compared to the Cars, citing it as an example of producer Kurt Ballou's affinity for classic power pop. Following the refrain "We can work it out, it's all a great big lie," the song transitions into a prominent lead guitar passage before building toward a more intense vocal performance from Johnson in its emotionally-charged chorus.

The song opens with the lines, "Girls can be kinda controlling / I wanna be controlled, I think it'd be alright." Writing for Stereogum, Ian Cohen interpreted the lyric as sarcastic, arguing that its apparent provocation was immediately undercut by the self-deprecating follow-up, "I wanna be controlled, I think it'd be all right." Elsewhere, the lyrics pair irony with earnest expressions of devotion and vulnerability, as Johnson promises, "If you were aimless, I'd be what you were aiming for / If you get anxious, I'll put on Law & Order for you." Overall, Johnson's impressionistic lyrics juxtapose fleeting memories with direct emotional confession.

== Reception ==
Critics frequently identified "Big Lie" as a standout from Million Dollars to Kill Me. Brad Nelson of Spin described it as the album's centerpiece, praising its lead guitar hook and Johnson's blend of fragmented imagery with emotional candor, while Exclaim! argued that it best encapsulated the ambiguity between irony and sincerity that characterized Johnson's songwriting on the album. Writing for Rolling Stone, Daniel Kreps cited the song as evidence of Johnson's increasingly tender lyricism and the band's evolution toward a more power pop–oriented sound.

Reviewers were divided over the song's opening lyric. Rabab Al-Sharif of Alternative Press described Johnson's lyrics as deceptively clever, highlighting the opening couplet as an example of his use of misdirection and sarcasm, while Larry Fitzmaurice of Pitchfork viewed it as a subversion of emo's stereotypical misogyny. In contrast, Ellen Johnson of Paste argued that, despite its humorous intent, the lyric nevertheless relied on a "tired trope."

In a 2025 retrospective ranking of Joyce Manor's catalog, Danielle Chelosky of Stereogum described "Big Lie" as one of the band's best songs, praising its memorable lyrics and the buildup to its cathartic bridge.
