= Alibi (Portland, Oregon) =

Restaurant and tiki bar in Portland, Oregon, U.S.

The Alibi
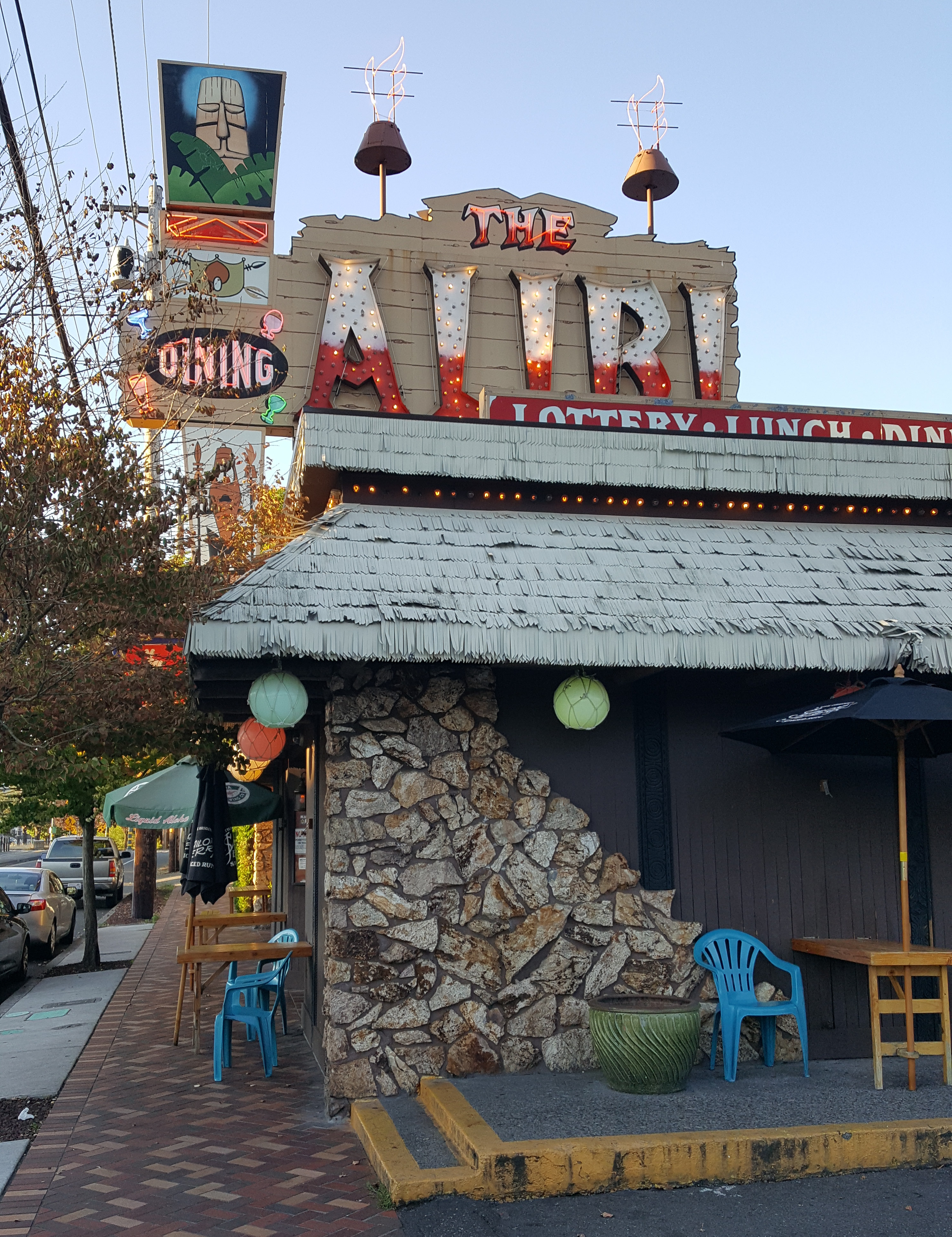
- The restaurant's exterior in 2016
- Interactive map of The Alibi

Restaurant information
- Established: 1947
- Location: 4024 North Interstate Avenue, Portland, Oregon, Multnomah, Oregon, 97227, United States
- Coordinates: 45.5525°N 122.6813°W

The Alibi, also known as Alibi Restaurant and Lounge and Alibi Tiki Lounge, is a restaurant and tiki bar located in Portland, Oregon's Overlook neighborhood, in the United States.

== Description ==
One Fodor's guide described Alibi as an "aggressively kitschy" and "divey" tropical-themed bar" with "unexceptional" food.

== History ==
The restaurant was established in 1947.

Chuck Palahniuk said Alibi was Portland's only tiki bar in his book Fugitives and Refugees (2003).

The business underwent on ownership change in late 2016.

The bar is referenced in punk band Joyce Manor's 2016 single "Last You Heard of Me".

== Reception ==
Alibi won in the "Best Karaoke" category of Willamette Week's "Best of Portland" readers' poll in 2002, 2018, 2020, and 2022.
