= 40 oz. to Fresno =

Studio album by Joyce Manor
- Released: June 10, 2022
- Recorded: July 2020; January 2021
- Studio: Sunset Sound
- Genres: Punk rock; power pop
- Length: 16:40
- Label: Epitaph
- Producer: Rob Schnapf

Joyce Manor chronology
Songs from Northern Torrance (2020)	40 oz. to Fresno (2022)	I Used to Go to This Bar (2026)

40 oz. to Fresno is the sixth studio album by American rock band Joyce Manor, released on June 10, 2022, by Epitaph Records. For the album, the band reunited with veteran producer Rob Schnapf, who last worked with the band on 2016's Cody. The album was written and recorded during the COVID-19 pandemic and features drummer Tony Thaxton of Motion City Soundtrack. The band drew inspiration from their early touring experiences, and the album showcases their signature concise, melodic pop-punk sound with themes of nostalgia and life on the road. The record also includes a cover of Orchestral Manoeuvres in the Dark's "Souvenir".

The album’s title references Sublime's 40 oz. to Freedom, with "Fresno" emerging from an accidental text autocorrect, and its cover features a photograph by longtime collaborator Dan Monick. Upon release, critics praised 40 oz. to Fresno for its catchy songwriting, compact structure, and energetic delivery.

== Background ==
Joyce Manor first formed in 2008 in Torrance, California. In their early years, the band built a following though online word-of-mouth and unhinged live performances. Early albums like Never Hungover Again and their self-titled debut solidified their standing in the fourth-wave emo scene. By the late 2010s, the band had remained on the road constantly, playing to audiences worldwide while shuffling through a rotating cast of drummers. Their latest, Pat Ware, left the group in 2019 to focus on law school. At that moment, vocalist/guitarist Barry Johnson confided in his bandmates that he needed a break, and all agreed to take time off. In the interim, the group compiled a rarities collection, Songs from Northern Torrance, and issued a remixed iteration of their debut. 40 oz. to Fresno originated during the coronavirus pandemic, with the members of Joyce Manor confined to their homes. Johnson was compiling tracks for Torrance when he came upon the unreleased song "Secret Sisters". The song had been recorded for Hungover, but left off the album. Johnson felt it might be exciting to record an album that sounded like it.

40 oz. was partially recorded in July 2020 and January 2021. Johnson confided with Epitaph head Brett Guerwitz on potential session drummers to record with, including Josh Freese. Gurewitz suggested Tony Thaxton, of 2000s emo pop stalwarts Motion City Soundtrack. Thaxton recorded his portions at Sunset Sound in Los Angeles, and the group were pleased with his contributions: "[He] is unreal at drums and wrote such cool parts," Johnson said. 40 oz. was the band's second album recorded with producer/engineer Rob Schnapf, who also helmed the boards behind the group's 2016 effort Cody. Johnson had grown to like that particular outing with time, and wondered if the band's most recent work could have benefited from Schnapf's input. In a statement, Johnson summarized the album's themes: "This album makes me think of our early tours, drinking a 40 in the van on a night drive blasting Guided by Voices and smoking cigarettes the whole way to Fresno."

The title is a reference to fellow Californian punkers Sublime, and their album 40 oz. to Freedom. Johnson had been re-listening to the group and texted a friend about the album, but his phone auto-corrected the message to Fresno, a city in California. Johnson had initially aimed to title Hungover Again, an allusion their 2014 breakthrough, but receded it shortly before the album was manufactured.

== Composition ==
"Souvenir", the opening track on 40 oz. to Fresno, is a cover of Orchestral Manoeuvres in the Dark's 1981 song. Joyce Manor recorded it as part of a 7-inch project with Blake Schwarzenbach of Jawbreaker for Matthew Rosenberg and Tyler Boss' comic book series What’s the Furthest Place From Here?. "[The comic is] set at a certain time, like pre-1990," Johnson recalled, and he viewed it as a playful opportunity to reinterpret OMD in a Weezer-like style. "NBTSA" is a reworked version of a song that had originally appeared as part of the Singles Series for Polyvinyl Records in 2017. "Don’t Try" was compiled from several unfinished songs by the band, with producer Rob Schnapf contributing guitar to a newly added bridge.

== Artwork ==
The album's final cover artwork replaced an earlier design after portions of the original packaging had already been printed. The initial cover was a photograph of frontman Barry Johnson eating a burrito, which was taken by his wife on her iPhone. During the pandemic, the group reviewed promotional photographs taken for the album's press cycle. While sorting through these images, Johnson identified an unused photograph by longtime collaborator Dan Monick that he felt was better suited as the album cover. Despite logistical challenges, the band ultimately received approval from Epitaph Records to change the artwork. A limited number of copies featuring the original cover were produced, with the remainder of the unused materials recycled, and the revised image was adopted as the album's official cover.

== Critical reception ==
Professional ratings
Review scores
Source	Rating
AllMusic	4/5 stars
Kerrang!	4/5
Pitchfork	7.3/10
Sputnikmusic	4/5

Lindsay Zoladz at The New York Times called it a "relentlessly tuneful 17-minute collection of all-killer, no-filler power-pop." Mia Hughes at Pitchfork considered it "less consciously ambitious than their previous two albums," though still a "refinement of their sound and feel." Timothy Monger, writing for AllMusic, concurred with that sentiment, commenting, "If 40 oz. to Fresno isn't the most ambitious entry in Joyce Manor's discography, it is at least one of their most enjoyable [...] it plays like a satisfying amalgam of their own tics and tendencies, self-contained in a concise 17-minute package." Chris DeVille of Stereogum reviewed it glowingly, summarizing it as "relentlessly catchy, holding power and finesse expertly in balance."

== Track listing ==
All tracks are written by Barry Johnson, Chase Knobbe, Matt Ebert, except where noted.

No.	Title	Writer(s)	Length
1.	"Souvenir"	Paul Humphreys; Martin Cooper	3:06
2.	"NBTSA"		1:12
3.	"Reason to Believe"	Johnson; Knobbe; Ebert; Rory Allen Phillips; Katy Davidson	1:25
4.	"You're Not Famous Anymore"		1:45
5.	"Don't Try"	Johnson; Knobbe; Ebert; Phillips	1:40
6.	"Gotta Let It Go"		1:56
7.	"Dance with Me"		2:28
8.	"Did You Ever Know"	Johnson; Knobbe; Ebert; Phillips	1:29
9.	"Secret Sisters"		1:39
Total length:			16:40

== Personnel ==
Joyce Manor

- Barry Johnson – guitar, vocals
- Chase Knobbe – guitar
- Matt Ebert – bass guitar

Additional musicians

- Tony Thaxton – drums
- Kurt Walcher – drums on "Secret Sisters"

Artwork

- David Parrot — illustrations
- Sabrina Mellado — poster
- Allie Hanlon — cover photo
- Irma Carol Wilde — illustration
- Jason Link — layout

Production

- Rob Schnapf – production, recording engineer
- Matt Schuessler — production, engineering
- Joe Reinhart — production, engineering, mixing on "Secret Sisters"
- Kyle Pulley — production, engineering, mixing on "Secret Sisters"
- Dave Cooley - mastering engineer
