= All My Friends Are So Depressed =

Single by Joyce Manor

from the album I Used To Go To This Bar
- Released: August 18, 2025
- Length: 2:42
- Label: Epitaph
- Songwriters: Barry Johnson; Chase Knobbe; Matt Ebert
- Producer: Brett Gurewitz

Joyce Manor singles chronology
"I Saw Water" (2023)	"All My Friends Are So Depressed" (2025)	"Well, Whatever It Was" (2025)

"All My Friends Are So Depressed" is a song recorded by the American rock band Joyce Manor. The song was released on August 18, 2025, through Epitaph Records, as the lead single from the band's seventh studio album, I Used To Go To This Bar (2026).

== Background ==
Frontman Barry Johnson described the song's lyrical origin as stemming from personal observations during touring. "The first line I came up with for this song was "lord above in a Tecate truck" after passing a Tecate beer delivery truck with Jesus [paraphernalia] all over it on the freeway driving back to Long Beach after a show [...] It's kind of my take on what I imagine Lana Del Rey lyrics are like. Instead of icy, detached cool 50's Americana, it's all dirty shag carpet, bong rips, Peter Frampton Comes Alive, key lime pie and suicidal ideations.” He cited influences ranging from the Smiths, the Libertines, and X to contemporary artists such as 100 gecs.

The song and accompanying album were produced by label head Brett Gurewitz, who became involved after Johnson sought guidance during the recording process for the song. Gurewitz suggested the song have an "‘80s Smiths vibe." The song's music video was directed by Johnson and Jaxon Whittington. Brady Gerber, writing for the Los Angeles Times, called the song a "Smiths-like desert country shuffle."

== Release and chart performance ==
"All My Friends Are So Depressed" marked the band's first new material since 2022's 40 oz. to Fresno, aside from a 2023 cover of Tigers Jaw's "I Saw Water". "All My Friends Are So Depressed" became the band's first radio hit, peaking at number 19 on Billboard's Alternative Airplay chart. L.A. station KROQ was the first to play the song, which was gratifying for the trio, as they grew up listening to the station.

Danielle Chelosky of Stereogum praised it as "pure, swimmy jangle-pop [...] a Smiths pastiche that it feels like they've been waiting their whole career to execute." NPR's All Songs Considered included "All My Friends Are So Depressed" in its rundown of the most anticipated albums and songs for 2026. Other critics were not as impressed. Grace Robins-Somerville at Pitchfork viewed it ineffective and "suffering from overly simplistic lyrics." Ethan Beck at Paste critiqued Gurewitz's production, remarking that it "renders the band's country bounce toothless."

=== Charts ===
Chart (2025)	Peak position
US Alternative Airplay (Billboard)	19
