= Cody (album) =

Studio album by Joyce Manor
- Released: October 7, 2016
- Genres: Punk rock; pop-punk; indie rock; emo
- Length: 24:30
- Label: Epitaph
- Producer: Rob Schnapf

Joyce Manor chronology
Never Hungover Again (2014)	Cody (2016)	Million Dollars to Kill Me (2018)

Singles from Cody
- 1. "Fake I.D." Released: August 8, 2016; 2. "Last You Heard of Me" Released: September 14, 2016; 3. "Eighteen" Released: December 7, 2016

Cody is the fourth studio album by American rock band Joyce Manor, released on October 7, 2016, by Epitaph Records. The California-based quartet first formed in the late 2000s, building a fanbase online and through exhausting touring. Its previous album, Never Hungover Again (2014), had cemented its status as one of the biggest pop-punk bands of the 2010s, earning rave reviews from critics. In the interim, the band dismissed original drummer Kurt Walcher, replacing him with Jeff Enzor, and frontman Barry Johnson embraced meditation.

Cody thematically centers on aging, examining concepts like addiction, drug usage, and relationships. For the album, the band approached veteran producer Rob Schnapf, known for his work with Beck, Elliott Smith, and Guided by Voices. The band worked for two months in the studio; Johnson, in conjunction with guidance from Schanpf, further refines the band's songwriting, introducing varying tempos and into the band's typically speedy sound. As a result, Cody is the group's longest album to date, at twenty-four minutes. The LP features guest vocal spots from Nate Ruess and Phoebe Bridgers.

Many music analysts expected Cody to expand the band's stardom, though its reaction was more muted. It debuted at number 192 on the Billboard 200, representing a drop-off from its predecessor. Music critics reacted favorably towards the album, though fans were initially divided regarding the change in direction. "Fake I.D.", "Last You Heard of Me", and "Eighteen" were issued as singles, and received music videos. Cody was supported by international touring stints alongside bands like Wavves, the Hotelier, and AJJ.

== Background ==
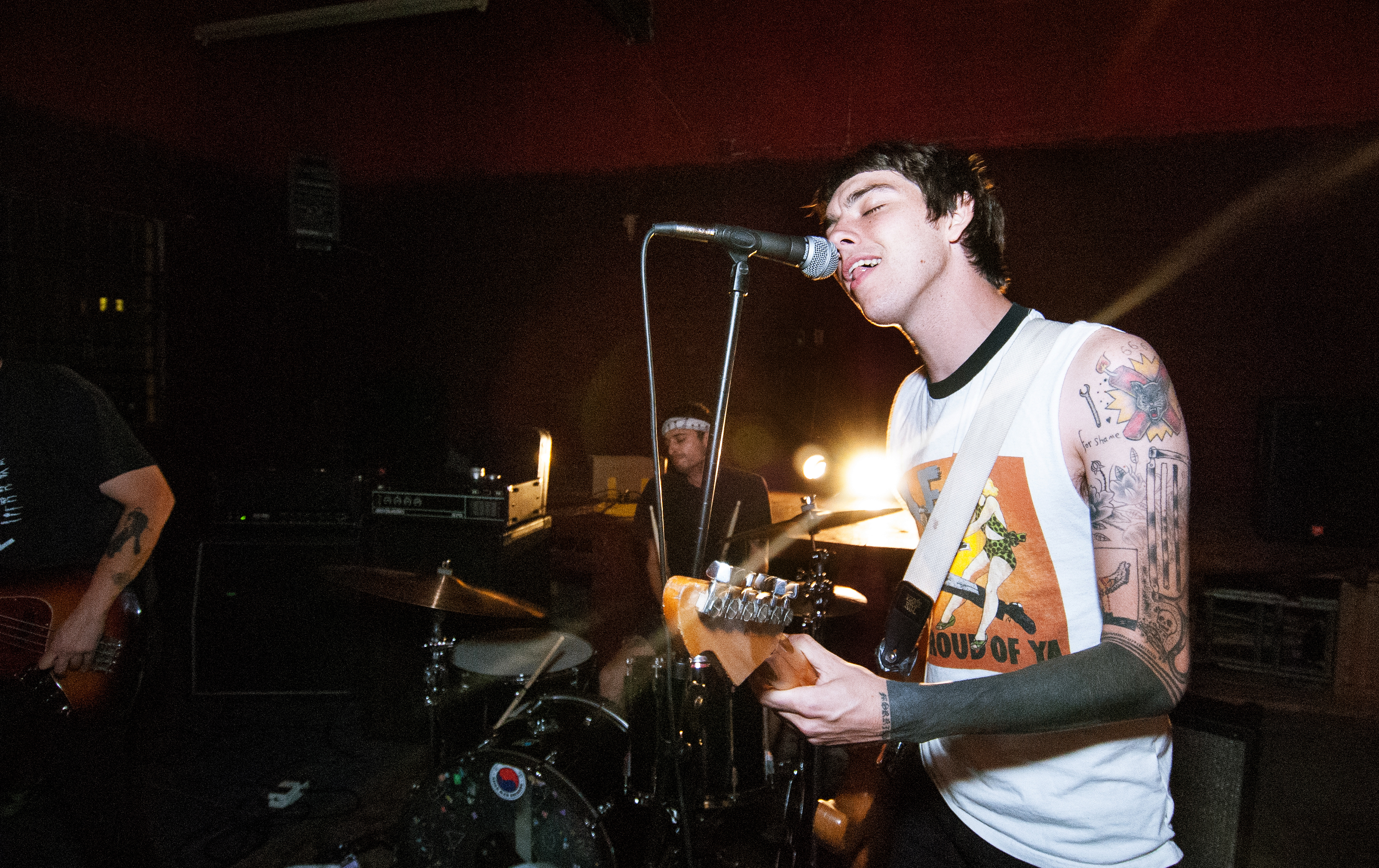
Joyce Manor frontman Barry Johnson developed an interest in meditation prior to recording Cody.

Pop-punk band Joyce Manor emerged in the late 2000s from Torrance, California, the pairing of vocalist/guitarist Barry Johnson and guitarist Chase Knobbe. The duo added Matt Ebert on bass and Kurt Walcher on drums before the release of their first, self-titled album, released in 2011. Though pop-punk had largely faded from the commercial spotlight, the band's popularity rose through word-of-mouth from fans online. Their next LP, the thirteen-minute long Of All Things I Will Soon Grow Tired, was released in 2012. By the time the band issued their third album—2014's Never Hungover Again, released on fabled indie imprint Epitaph Records—the group became "torch-bearers" for a new generation of pop-punk fans, alongside acts like Modern Baseball. Never Hungover Again received rave reviews from contemporary critics, including many who paid little attention to the aforementioned punk/emo scenes.

The pressure for a follow-up led Johnson to consider disbanding Joyce Manor. He considered starting a new venture under the alias Cody, and he played a few shows under the name the Snowcones. He also struggled with the decision to dismiss Walcher; all felt he did not connect with the band's songwriting, and fit awkwardly into its process. Johnson had been working with drummer Jeff Enzor on a side project, but their chemistry felt so natural that he was asked to join Joyce Manor. In the interim, Johnson developed an interest in meditation, which he credited with providing inspiration and a sense of intuition—less second-guessing on what artistically may be right.

His uncertainty regarding the future of the band was changed upon a lunch meeting with Epitaph founder Brett Gurewitz. "We sat down and he was like, 'When are you gonna record?' And I was like, 'Dude, I don't have any fuckin' songs,'" Johnson remembered. The quartet had booked studio time several months in advance, but writing was coming slower to Johnson than typically. Gurewitz suggested veteran engineer Rob Schnapf to work with; his long producing pedigree included artists like Beck, Guided By Voices, Kurt Vile, Saves the Day, and Elliott Smith. Johnson worried he may not be interested, but when he met the group met with the group, Schnapf took a liking to them: "[I] feel like I made a bunch of good friends," he said at the end of the recording process. The quartet came to regard him as essential member of their creative process, a "fifth member" of the band when making their next album, which Johnson also titled Cody.

== Recording and production ==
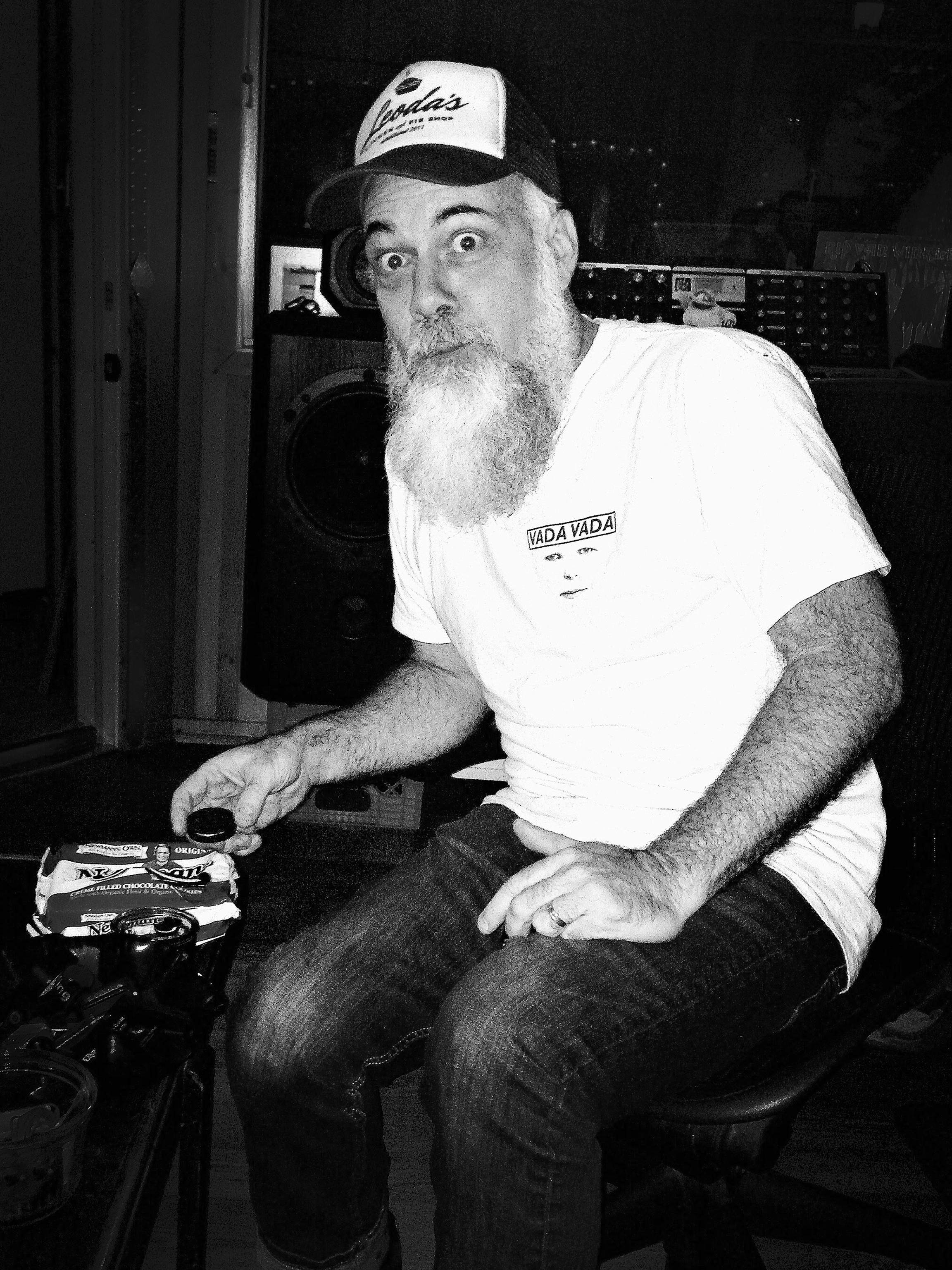
For Cody, the group worked with producer Rob Schnapf, whose credits include Saves the Day and Guided by Voices.

Cody was recorded in two months, with Scnahpf as producer and Brain Rosemeyer serving as recording engineer. The process was considered more lengthy than its predecessors, which were recorded in sometimes as little as a day. The excitement of working with Schnapf begat a creative period for Johnson: "suddenly a switch turned on in my brain, and I started writing a lot of really good stuff," he said. Three of the album's songs—"Over Before It Began", "Make Me Dumb", and "This Song Is a Mess and So Am I"—were composed in only a day. Johnson aimed to include more of his initial thoughts when penning lyrics, which frightened him: "I didn't try and paint a different picture of who I am or how my brain works. I left some of the more unsightly bits in there. It's scary, and it was even scary to show my bandmates. I was worried they'd think I was losing my mind," he said. Johnson had a particularly inspired period of writing in November 2015, penning nearly forty songs that "came out finished" but nonetheless did not make the track listing.

Schnapf worked with the band on structuring its songs differently, devoting more attention to Johnson's melodies. The team set the song's BPM to where the vocal melody sounded most comfortable, which gave some songs a slower, more melancholy feeling, according to Johnson. The songs on Cody differ from previous Joyce Manor albums in that only two are short—previous efforts emphasized bracingly fast arrangements. From a songwriting standpoint, this includes devices like inverted chords, additional verses, varying tempos, and memorable hooks. Perhaps due to the lack of commercial impact of their previous album, Johnson stated that he focused on crafting catchy, infectious hooks. Regarding his past focus on brisk songs, Johnson admitted, "I think it truly [came] from my lack of knowledge of arranging." Scnahpf did not approach his role any differently than his usual mode: "I didn't really approach it in any way other than thinking about trying to get all the chord inversions and those bits of Barry and Chase to both rock and still be able to stack up and spread out." He called Ebert a "one-take wonder" and praised Enzor as an exceptional percussionist. Schanpf had a specific way he wanted to go about recording, according to Johnson, and the quartet wanted to respect his process.

Oregonian indie pop act Dear Nora and San Francisco folk band Sun Kil Moon were influences on the sound of Cody, and Johnson pointed to Schnapf's previous work with pop punk pioneers Saves the Day, and their 2001 album Stay What You Are, as a good point of reference for the sonic quality they strove to achieve for Cody. After completion, the LP was mastered by Mark Chalecki at Little Red Book Mastering in Los Angeles, California. Additional guitar parts are credited to a "Ralph" in the album booklet.

== Themes and songwriting ==
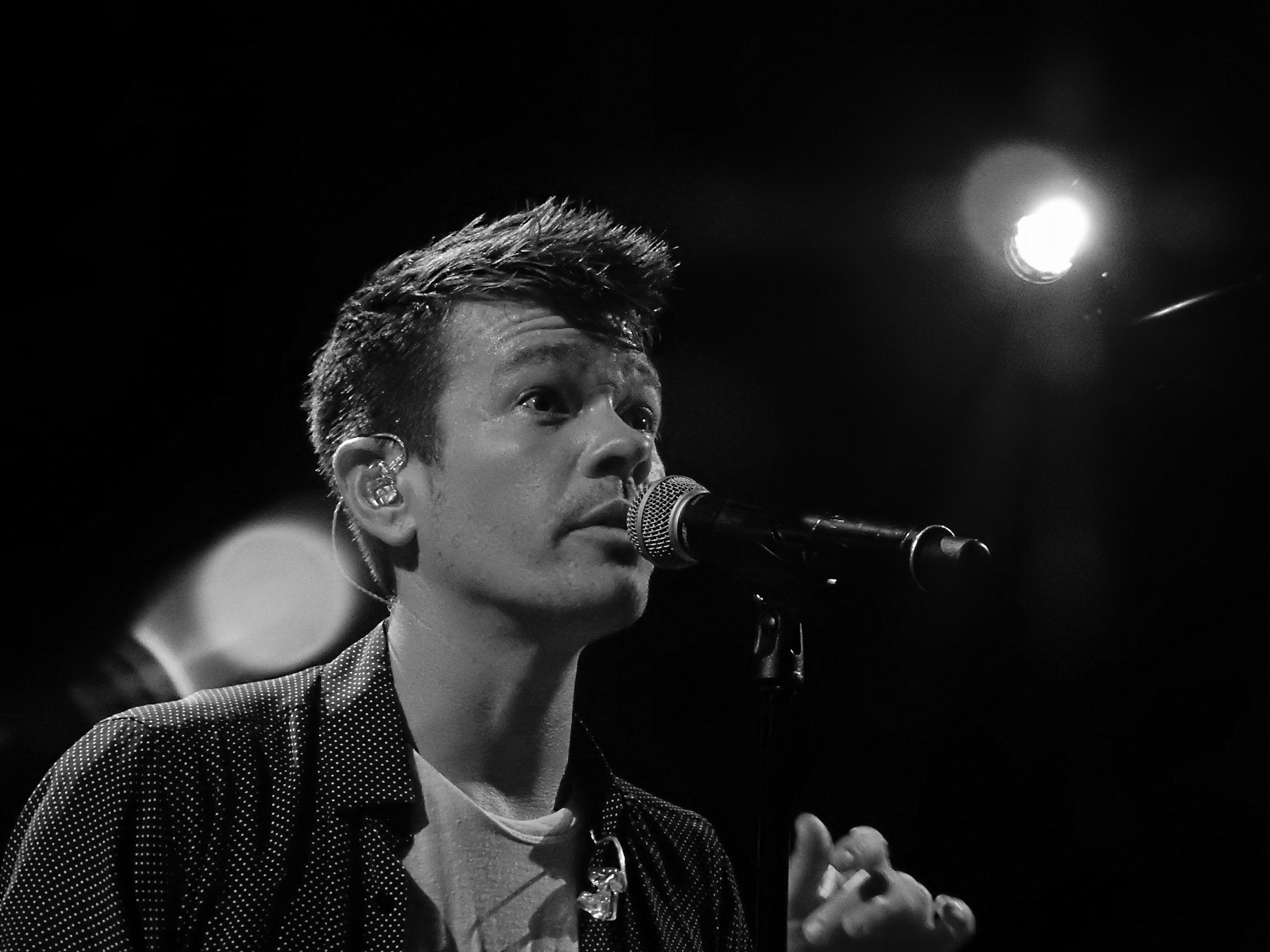

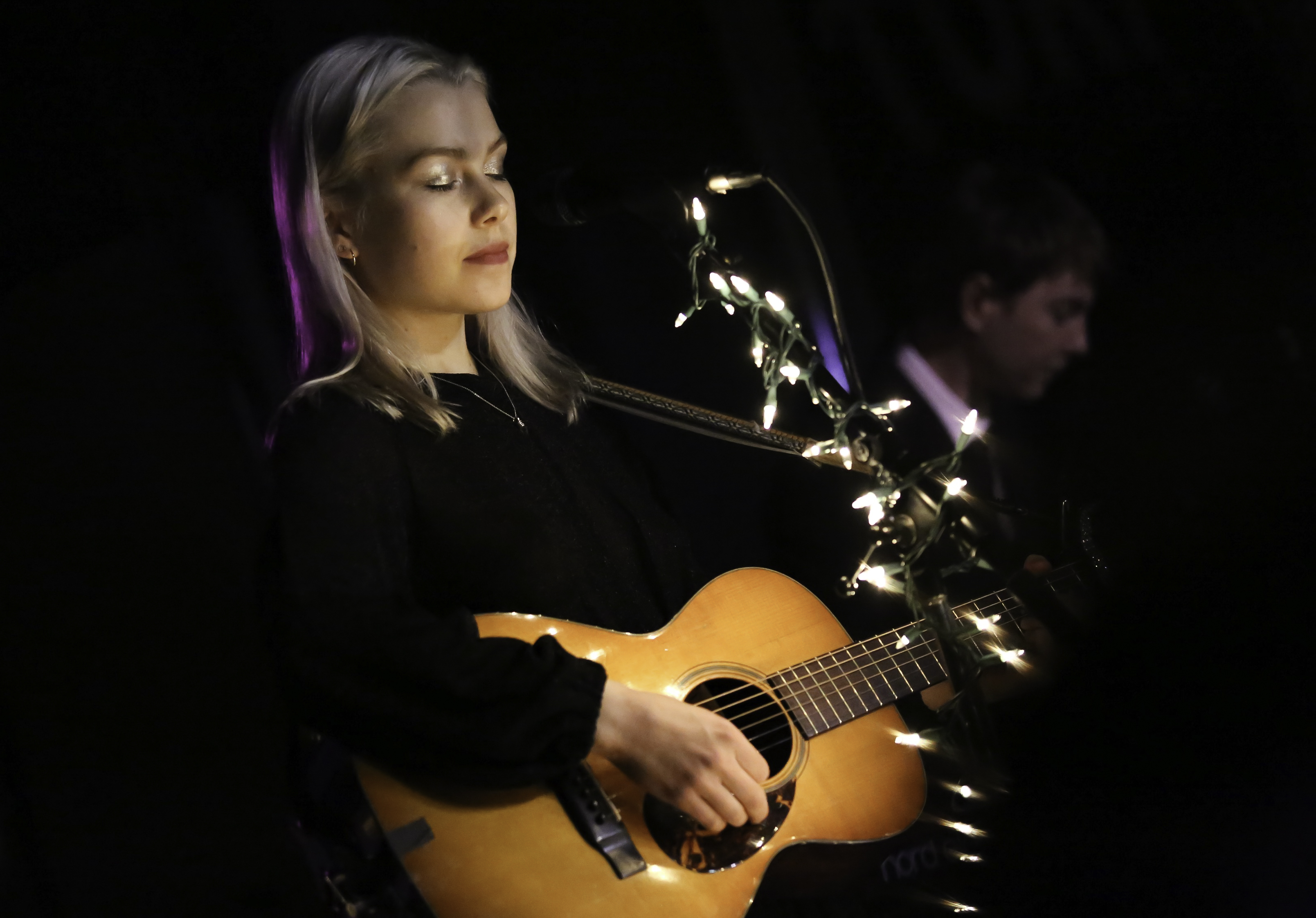
Cody includes guest appearances from Nate Ruess (top) and Phoebe Bridgers (bottom).

Cody is the longest Joyce Manor album to date, clocking in at twenty-four minutes long. It thematically tackles the process of aging, and its associated anxieties. Jon Caramanica, staff writer at The New York Times, suggested this takes root in multiple forms: "acknowledgment of the gap between what you like and what the kids like, acceptance that growing older does not always come with actual personal evolution, recognition that the exuberance of youth was just a performance, and so many more." Johnson identified the album as displaying a tender quality above all: "I'm just a big softy now and that's coming out through the songs. It wasn't even a conscious thing but it wasn't anything that I was afraid of. I wanted to embrace that," he said. Historically, some lyrics had led listeners to assume Johnson was writing in first-person, though he were actually writing in character. Within Cody, however, many songs are based on actual experiences, or people he interacted with.

"Fake I.D." centers on the protagonist having a one-night stand with someone younger, who enjoys hearing themselves talk, about the immeasurable talent of Kanye West, who she opines is better than the actor Phil Hartman, or the author John Steinbeck. As the song concludes, Johnson retreats to his memories, alluding to the death of his friend Brandon Carlisle, the drummer of Wyoming punk act Teenage Bottlerocket, who unexpectedly died in 2015. Johnson said the lyrics of "Fake I.D." toe the line between "idiotic" and realistic; "the song reads like a fucking ClickHole article or something," he said. He chose the song to open the album due to its catchiness, but also manic energy, considering it a bold choice. He characterized its follow-up, the contemplative "Eighteen", as the opposite of a coming-of-age song: its lyrics are about being old, rather than the common pop-punk trope of songs about growing up. Its final lyric finds Johnson singing, "I feel so old today." "Angel in the Snow" features backing vocals from Nate Ruess, best known for his work with pop act Fun. Stereogum contributor Tom Breihan highlighted the unusual nature of the pairing, suggesting that Ruess' talent as a vocalist was knowingly obscured by being "buried deep in the mix". Johnson had invited Ruess via email, and when the two met for drinks, they hit it off, finding they had much in common.

"Do You Really Want to Not Get Better" is a slow, acoustic duet with the then-nascent songwriter Phoebe Bridgers, which lyrically tackles a friend's struggle with addiction. After the band met the then-unsigned singer, Bridgers expressed admiration for Elliott Smith. Johnson invited her to the studio to meet Schnapf, who had worked with Smith. "Last You Heard of Me" details a predictable night at a Portland karaoke bar, and a regretful romantic entanglement with a crush. "Stairs", the longest song the band had recorded to this point, begins with Johnson—"or his character"—bemoaning the fact that he's 26 and must "still live with [his] parents." The track takes an alarming turn midway through, with Johnson pleading to watch a loved one "sleep for weeks" while tied to a bed. The song was written nearly a decade prior; Johnson re-discovered the song performing on an acoustic tour with Hop Along's Frances Quinlan, and decided to re-work it for its inclusion on Cody.

== Artwork ==
The album was originally titled Dear Nora Jonestown Massacre, but came to be titled after a name once proposed for the band itself. The album’s cover artwork features a photograph taken by Minneapolis-based photographer Adam DeGross, depicting dog gnawing a mannequin head. The picture was taken with a disposable camera. It was added to the project at the last second; the original art, a drawing of potted plants, was created by band friend Alex Fielder and utilized for its interior booklet. This original illustration got as far as the printers for the jackets/cases. Johnson contacted DeGross to request permission to use the photograph, but Patty Costello's band Butcher’s Union had also asked to use it for album artwork. The photographer ultimately approved its use for Joyce Manor.

The back cover also makes usage of Epitaph's original "tombstone" logo, since retired, but a mainstay of many punk albums in the 1990s, including NOFX's Punk in Drublic and the Offspring's Smash. Johnson liked the photocopied, DIY look of the original, and asked to have it used instead of the label's newer, stylized font.

== Release and commercial performance ==
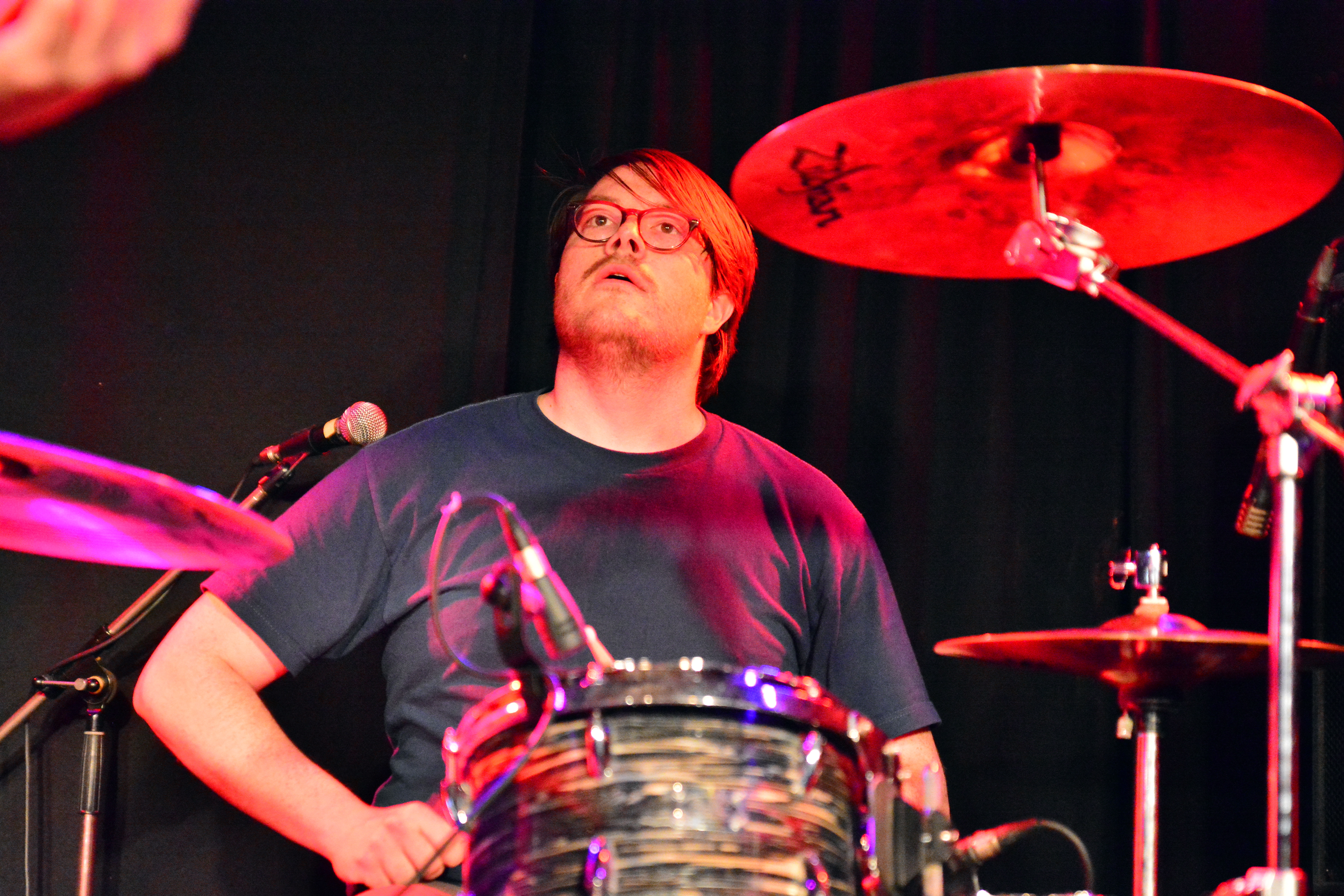
Cody is the only Joyce Manor album recorded with drummer Jeff Enzor.

Joyce Manor first announced Cody on August 8, 2016, as well as lead single "Fake I.D.". Its music video, directed by Christopher Good, saw release on August 23; It was followed by second single "Last You Heard of Me" on September 14; it received a music video, also helmed by Good, which was released on October 5. Its third and final single, "Eighteen", was issued with its music video on December 7; it showcases footage of the band performing live in the inaugural tour supporting Cody, and was shot by Bob Vielma.

Cody was projected by critics to be a consequential moment in the group's career; many expected it to elevate the band to mainstream heights or alienate their fanbase, and indeed, fans were initially uncertain in their impression of the album. Collin Brennan at online magazine Consequence of Sound listed it among the publication's most anticipated albums of that season. Upon release, Cody peaked at the very bottom of the Billboard 200, at number #192, a drop from its predecessor. Still, this reaction was not on par with what the band had been led to believe: "It wasn't like the album that changed shit for us for good or bad," Johnson said later. "It wasn't career destroying or career making. It was just carer continuing." It ended up being their only album with Enzor behind the drum kit; he was replaced on 2018's Million Dollars to Kill Me by Pat Ware, of the group Spraynard. "Make Me Dumb" was included on the soundtrack of the video game Forza Horizon 3.

== Critical reception ==
Professional ratings
Aggregate scores
Source	Rating
Metacritic	79/100
Review scores
Source	Rating
The 405	80
AllMusic	2.5/5 stars
Alternative Press	80
The A.V. Club	B
Consequence of Sound	80
DIY	80
Drowned in Sound	80
Exclaim!	80
The New York Times	Positive
Pitchfork	7.7/10
Punknews.org	4.5/5 stars

Altogether, its reaction upon release was strong, with the album earning favorable reviews from many critics. Metacritic, a site that aggregates reviews from critics, gives the album 79 out of 100 based on 16 reviews, indicating "generally favorable reviews". David Sackllah, writing for Consequence of Sound, expressed a similar sentiment: "While not quite an identity crisis, Cody is first and foremost a record of reflection and exploration." In a positive review, Pitchfork's Quinn Moreland praised the risks the band took: "For the first time, a Joyce Manor album includes an acoustic track and a song over four minutes", while also praising their ability to stay themselves: "[...] every track contains enough blunt expressions of existential despair to tie them to their angsty past." Though the site gave it positive marks, Pitchfork included Cody in its year-end list of "disappointments," with writer Matthew Schnipper deriding Cody as an attempt to sound like the band Everclear.

=== Accolades ===
Publication	Accolade	Year	Rank
The A.V. Club	The A.V. Club's Top 50 Albums of 2016	2016	10

== Touring ==
To support the release, Joyce Manor embarked on several international tours. The first in support of Cody was a North American jaunt in August and October 2016, joined by the bands Diet Cig, the Hotelier, and Crying. Tickets sold quicker according to Cody Sizemore, talent buyer and promotions for Innovation Concerts. Within the new year, the group had announced a tour with AJJ, again touring across North America between January and February 2017. Afterwards, the group played some one-off California shows, followed by a brief stint in Australia and New Zealand in May and June with the Smith Street Band. In July, the quartet embarked on a two-week tour of the United Kingdom and Ireland, alongside English band Martha. Later in the year, the group mounted a co-headlining tour with fellow Californian pop-punkers Wavves, assisted on dates by Culture Abuse and French Vanilla; the trek took place between October and November 2017.

Tracks from Cody initially received a chilly reception by audiences. "If you went to any Joyce Manor shows at the time, there was a significant dip in energy whenever a Cody song came up," wrote journalist Ian Cohen. Johnson himself concurred, but noted the reception improved over time:

Every record we've done, it's taken about a year for kids to really respond to the material the way they do the rest of the set. And when you have a room full of people that are singing along and jumping around and stuff, it's way easier to play songs than to a room that's just kind of standing there. So I think that those two kinda happening at the same time is a cool feeling. [...] "Fake I.D." and "Eighteen" are the sing-alongs.

== Track listing ==
All tracks are written by Joyce Manor.

No.	Title	Length
1.	"Fake I.D."	2:20
2.	"Eighteen"	2:05
3.	"Angel In The Snow"	2:08
4.	"Do You Really Want to Not Get Better?"	1:16
5.	"Last You Heard of Me"	3:08
6.	"Make Me Dumb"	2:47
7.	"Over Before It Began"	2:51
8.	"Reversing Machine"	1:29
9.	"Stairs"	4:02
10.	"This Song Is A Mess But So Am I"	2:24
Total length:		24:30

== Personnel ==
Joyce Manor

- Barry Johnson – guitar, vocals
- Chase Knobbe – guitar
- Jeff Enzor – drums, cover layout
- Matt Ebert – bass guitar

Additional musicians

- Phoebe Bridgers – backing vocals on "Do You Really Want to Not Get Better?"
- Nate Ruess – backing vocals on "Angel in the Snow"

Production

- Rob Schnapf – production
- Brain Rosemeyer – recording engineer
- Mark Chalecki – mastering engineer
- Alex Fiedler – artwork
- Adam DeGross – photography

== Charts ==
Chart (2016)	Peak position
US Billboard 200	192
US Billboard Alternative Albums	19
US Billboard Heatseekers	1
US Billboard Independent Albums	24
US Billboard Top Rock Albums	30
US Billboard Tastemaker Albums	30
