= Fake I.D. (song) =

Single by Joyce Manor

from the album Cody
- Released: August 8, 2016
- Genre: Punk rock; indie rock
- Length: 2:20
- Label: Epitaph
- Songwriters: Barry Johnson; Chase Knobbe; Jeff Enzor; Matt Ebert
- Producer: Rob Schnapf

Joyce Manor singles chronology
"Schley" (2014)	"Fake I.D." (2016)	"Last You Heard of Me" (2016)

"Fake I.D." is a song recorded by the American rock band Joyce Manor. The song was released on August 8, 2016, through Epitaph Records, as the lead single from the band's fourth studio album Cody. The song depicts a hopeless one-night stand with a conversational narcissist. Frontman Barry Johnson wrote the song's lyrics, which reference a litany of public figures, including rapper Kanye West, author John Steinbeck, and actor Phil Hartman.

Critics appreciated "Fake I.D."; the song's sardonic tone and West line were praised by critics. The song was selected for an All Songs Considered column by NPR, and was ranked as the eighth-best song of its year by Time. The song's music video, the first of three for the album directed by Christopher Good, illustrates a teen obtaining a fake I.D. in order to buy alcohol through unorthodox methods.

== Background ==
"Fake I.D." shares songwriting credits between all of the members of Joyce Manor at that time. The tune centers on a protagonist having a one-night stand with someone younger, who enjoys hearing themselves talk, about the immeasurable talent of Kanye West, who she opines is better than the actor Phil Hartman, or the author John Steinbeck. As the song concludes, vocalist Barry Johnson retreats to his memories, alluding to the death of his friend Brandon Carlisle, the drummer of Wyoming punk act Teenage Bottlerocket, who unexpectedly died in 2015. Johnson said the lyrics of "Fake I.D." toe the line between "idiotic" and realistic; "the song reads like a fucking ClickHole article or something," he said. Johnson characterized the track as "one of the most upbeat and fun songs we have ever done." Despite this, he feared for the song's reaction from their fanbase before its release, figuring its tone (major-scale) and lyrics (mainly the West line) might irritate listeners.

== Release and reception ==
Epitaph issued "Fake I.D." as the lead single from Cody on August 8, 2016. The band released a music video on August 22, directed by Christopher Good. It stars actress Andreina Byrne as a young adult that is not yet 21 obtaining a fake I.D. To avoid getting caught, Byrne must wear an unusual costume while procuring the liquor. The Fader columnist Patrick McDermott likened it to a short teen movie, writing, "It's like something John Hughes might've schemed up had he grown up getting stoned at SoCal basement shows."

NPR selected the songs for its All Songs Considered column, with a description that reads "Best known for whiplash running times and ragged vocals, the punk four-piece takes half a step away from both — while fitting in a hilariously left-field Kanye namecheck." Ben Kaye at Consequence of Sound wrote that "the track is a refrain-less punch of bitterness that cautions against those first few moments of what you mistake for love." Tanner Smith at PopMatters praised the song's sardonic tone, calling Johnson "a funny and perceptive writer of youth culture." TIME ranked "Fake I.D." as the eighth-best song of its year.

== Personnel ==
Joyce Manor

- Barry Johnson – guitar, vocals, songwriting
- Chase Knobbe – guitar, songwriting
- Jeff Enzor – drums, songwriting
- Matt Ebert – bass guitar, songwriting

Production

- Rob Schnapf – production
- Brain Rosemeyer – recording engineer
- Mark Chalecki – mastering engineer
