= Million Dollars to Kill Me =

Studio album by Joyce Manor
- Released: September 21, 2018
- Genres: Indie rock; pop-punk; punk rock; emo; power pop
- Length: 22:26
- Label: Epitaph
- Producers: Kurt Ballou; Robert Cheeseman; Rory Allen Phillips

Joyce Manor chronology
| Cody (2016) | Million Dollars to Kill Me (2018) | Songs from Northern Torrance (2020) |

Singles from Million Dollars to Kill Me
- 1. "Million Dollars to Kill Me" Released: July 18, 2018; 2. "Think I'm Still In Love With You" Released: August 15, 2018; 3. "Silly Games" Released: September 18, 2018

Million Dollars to Kill Me is the fifth studio album by American punk rock band Joyce Manor, released on September 21, 2018, through Epitaph Records. After exploring a more polished and melodic palette on Cody, their previous album, the California quintet went through a transitional period marked by creative fatigue. Following the departure of drummer Jeff Enzor, Joyce Manor added Pat Ware of Spraynard, and his arrival provided fresh momentum that encouraged the band to continue performing and ultimately commit to making the album.

The album was produced by Kurt Ballou, best known as the guitarist of Converge, with the band seeking a heavier, harder sound. Several songs were the product of a collaboration between frontman Barry Johnson and Rory Phillips, of ska revivalists the Impossibles. Lyrically, Million Dollars to Kill Me reflects themes of exhaustion, self-doubt, finance, and emotional disillusionment, shaped by Johnson’s desire for simplicity and directness.

Million Dollars to Kill Me received generally positive reviews, though some critics felt it lacked narrative cohesion. The album cycle saw Joyce Manor touring more extensively and in larger venues than before, including tours with acts such as Vundabar and Saves the Day. In retrospect, the band has spoken ambivalently about the album, which was followed by a brief hiatus, while "Big Lie" has remained the most consistently represented track from the record in their live performances.

== Background ==
Joyce Manor of California had steadily built a following across the 2010s, signing to indie label Epitaph and releasing the well-received Never Hungover Again in 2014. For their next album, Cody, the group shifted toward a more polished and melodic sound, emphasizing more varied arrangements and hooks. Though poised as a turning point, Cody was not commercially impactful on a grand scale, despite positive critical reception.

Band members later described the period surrounding the album’s creation as demanding but enjoyable, shaped by extensive touring and a sense of fatigue. "It was a haze of a lot of drinking and just getting through it," Johnson said. He argued that the band would have benefited from taking a break, noting that they had entered a period of "perpetual motion" driven by concerns over maintaining momentum. After parting ways with drummer Jeff Enzor, the band recruited Pat Ware, of the group Spraynard. His inclusion reinforced their reason to keep going: "“He's a killer drummer and a great guy and it’s like, 'Let’s do some tours with Pat. And then we started writing with him and it's like, 'Let's do a record.'"

== Recording ==
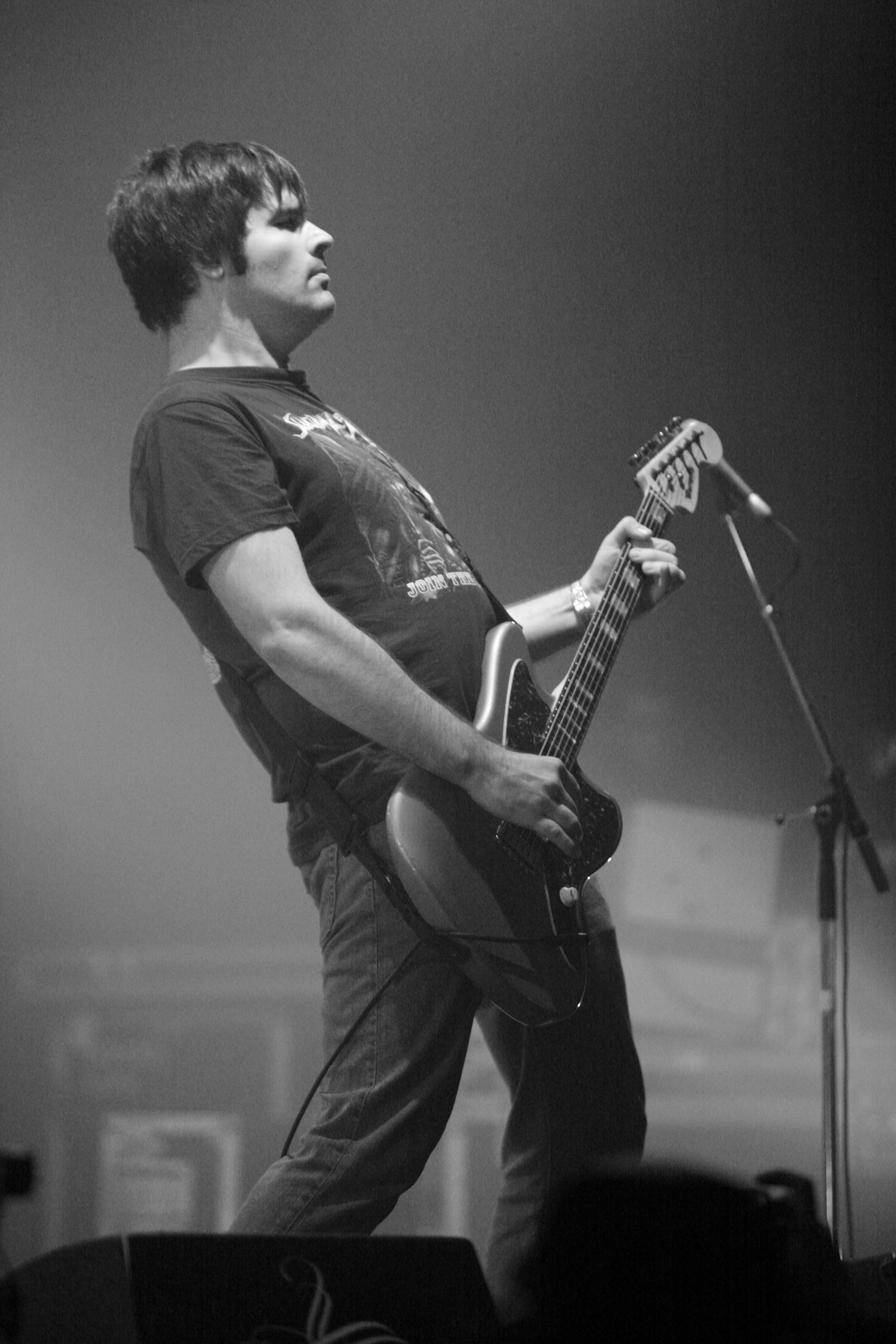
Producer Kurt Ballou in 2007

After completing Cody, frontman Barry Johnson briefly considered stepping away from Joyce Manor, feeling that four albums might be enough. While revisiting obscure late-'90s ska-adjacent projects, he connected with Rory Phillips of the Impossibles. Their correspondence quickly evolved into a creative exchange, with the two tentatively collaborating via email. What was planned for a 7-inch side project ultimately was folded back into Joyce Manor. Johnson ultimately rejected the idea of a side project, choosing to keep his creative output singular and firmly rooted in the band. The work he did with Phillips informs much of Million Dollars; Phillips retains writing credit on four of the ten songs.

After pursuing catchy hooks on their last album, Joyce Manor viewed this album as a chance to push their sound into heavier territory, which led them to enlist Kurt Ballou as producer. Ballou was known primarily for his work as the guitarist of metalcore outfit Converge. Johnson had long admired his work with screamo and hardcore bands like Orchid and Pg. 99. Ballou, meanwhile, was drawn to Joyce Manor because their music echoed an influence of classic power pop. "I'm from Boston, so the legend of the Cars loomed large," Ballou told Ian Cohen in a 2018 interview. "That juxtaposition of aggression and melody is exactly what Joyce Manor is all about." In some ways, the two were misaligned or had different expectations, according to Johnson. He later recalled that while he expected Ballou to make the record "scarier," Ballou instead embraced the opportunity to work outside his usual aggressive framework. The band likened Ballou's role to a calm, grounding presence, with the band appreciative of his subtle post-rock flourishes and textural guitar parts.

== Composition ==
The lyrics of Million Dollars to Kill Me reflect a growing sense of exhaustion and introspection. Frontman Barry Johnson strived for refinement and economy in his songwriting over ambition. His goals were tighter songs, clearer verse-chorus structures, and straightforward lyrics. "I always wanted things to be shorter and more concise and just distill it. It's like stand up, you can't tell a long-ass joke," he said. In retrospect, Johnson also noticed a recurring fixation on finances throughout the album. Sonically, Chris DeVille in Stereogum interpreted the album as reminiscent of Britpop. Israel Daramola compared the title track to the sound of Weezer or Jimmy Eat World. Elsewhere, Andrew Unterberger in Billboard observed that the band embraces "'60s R&B sighs [in] "Silly Games" and gauzy 4AD guitars of "Gone Tomorrow".

The album opens with "Fighting Kangaroo" which was intended as a mission statement for the group. Johnson explained that he aimed to recapture the energy of the band's debut by writing a song that was both fun for live shows and accessible to new fans, but it ultimately did not become one of the band's most popular tracks. "It didn’t end up turning into the anthem I hoped it would," he said in 2025. Several songs directly critique contradictions surrounding wealth and authenticity. The acoustic "I'm Not the One" emerged from Johnson's disdain for the super-rich trying to be appear moral, but the song ultimately turns its scrutiny inward, critiquing peers and scenes that conflate success with merit. The song started brash and loud, but Johnson viewed addressing punk themes in a quieter style more impactful. The title track channels self-doubt and frustration; Johnson has described the song as being about the emotional pull of unhealthy relationships, inspired by a real-life conflict surrounding a former bandmate’s wedding that forced him to confront unresolved resentments. His first experiment with Phillips produced "Silly Games", which Johnson praised for its Beatles-like quality.

"Friends We Met Online" directly addresses internet culture: its role in alleviating loneliness for some, but also ambivalence over its increasing encroachment in everyday life. "Big Lie", meanwhile, was originally written for Cody but repurposed for the new album. "Wildflowers" was the last song written for the album when they realized it was too short. Johnson wrote the song to reflect the simple beauty of flowers, infusing the song with a quiet melancholy that underscores how strikingly perfect a bouquet can appear.

== Artwork and title ==
The album's title stems from an interview with Blink-182 drummer Travis Barker, describing his dark mental state following his 2008 plane crash. The anecdote, which he notes in his memoir Can I Say, recounts when he offered a friend a million dollars to end his suffering. "It just stuck in my head, it's just the opposite of what everyone wants — money and to not die. It's super rock 'n' roll," said frontman Barry Johnson.

The album’s cover artwork is a live photograph taken by Hans White of the band onstage at the Phoenix Theater in Petaluma, California. It depicts the band, as well their crew member, posing with instruments stage equipment. The Phoenix is a venue noted for its association with the band AFI, whom Joyce Manor have cited as an influence. The back cover features a separate candid photograph taken during the same performance, depicting Ware flipping off the camera.

== Critical reception and aftermath ==
At Metacritic, a site that aggregates reviews from critics, gives the album 75 out of 100 based on 10 reviews, indicating "generally favorable reviews". Timothy Monger from AllMusic dubbed the album a "thoughtful and overall solid set." Joe Coscarelli from The New York Times mentioned it as a highlight of that seasons's pop/rock releases. Pitchfork's Larry Fitzmaurice opined that the band's "willingness to expand the subtleties of their sound makes Million Dollars to Kill Me an enthralling listen, even at its lowest points." For Jenzia Burgos at Paste, she felt it lacked the "narrative depth" of previous records, while building musically to showcase their "slickest power pop yet." Suzy Exposito of Rolling Stone described the album as a brief but impactful power-pop record: "Joyce Manor are a new class of New Romantics," she said. Andrew Unterberger in Billboard called it one of the 25 Best Rock Albums of 2018.

In touring in support of the album, the band played larger rooms than before, including two headlining shows at the Hollywood Palladium. The band was supported by Vundabar and Big Eyes on live dates, and joined Saves the Day for a summer co-headlining jaunt in 2019.

The band have looked back at Million Dollars through a complicated lens. Afterwards, Ware returned to law school, leaving the band as a three-piece, and they decided to take a small hiatus before the COVID-19 pandemic hit in 2020. For Johnson, he came to view chasing crossover potential as an artistic "dead-end": "It seemed like we were trying to make it or transcend the genre, like we were trying to become a big radio rock band," he said in 2022. Ian Cohen, for Uproxx, later called it "clearly the work of artists who couldn’t quite articulate their visions." Danielle Chelosky from Stereogum placed it as the band's worst album in a ranking of their discography. "Million Dollars is too much fun to be bad," she conceded, but argued that it is unmemorable and oddly sequenced. "Big Lie" is one of the only songs from the record regularly included in Joyce Manor's live setlists.

== Track listing ==
All tracks are written by Barry Johnson, Chase Knobbe, Matt Ebert, and Pat Ware, except where noted.

| No. | Title | Writer(s) | Length |
|---|---|---|---|
| 1. | "Fighting Kangaroo" | Johnson; Knobbe; Ebert; Ware; Rory Phillips | 1:59 |
| 2. | "Think I'm Still In Love with You" | | 2:47 |
| 3. | "Big Lie" | | 2:44 |
| 4. | "I'm Not the One" | | 2:31 |
| 5. | "Million Dollars to Kill Me" | | 2:09 |
| 6. | "Silly Games" | Johnson; Knobbe; Ebert; Ware; Phillips | 2:35 |
| 7. | "Friends We Met Online" | Johnson; Knobbe; Ebert; Ware; Phillips | 2:11 |
| 8. | "Up the Punx" | | 1:33 |
| 9. | "Gone Tomorrow" | | 2:09 |
| 10. | "Wildflowers" | Johnson; Knobbe; Ebert; Ware; Phillips | 1:48 |
| Total length: | | | 22:26 |

== Personnel ==
Joyce Manor

- Barry Johnson – guitar, vocals
- Chase Knobbe – guitar
- Matt Ebert – bass guitar
- Pat Ware – drums

Production

- Kurt Ballou – production, engineer (1-9)
- Rory Phillips – producer (10), additional recording, songwriting (1, 6, 7, and 10)
- Mike Bardzik – vocal production
- Andrew Scheps – mixing
- Scott Arnold – design, layout
- Hans White – photography
- Robert Cheeseman – engineer (1-9)
- Brett Gurewitz – additional recording
- Peter Novoa – additional recording
- Eric Boulanger – mastering

== Charts ==
| Chart (2018) | Peak position |
|---|---|
| US Billboard Heatseekers | 5 |
| US Billboard Independent Albums | 18 |
| US Billboard Tastemaker Albums | 9 |
