= I Used to Go to This Bar =

Studio album by Joyce Manor
- Released: January 30, 2026
- Studios: Dave's Room; Sunset Sound; Shipwreck; Brett's house
- Length: 19:03
- Label: Epitaph
- Producer: Brett Gurewitz

Joyce Manor chronology
40 oz. to Fresno (2022)	I Used to Go to This Bar (2026)

Singles from I Used to Go to This Bar
- 1. "All My Friends Are So Depressed" Released: August 18, 2025

I Used to Go to This Bar is the seventh studio album by American rock band Joyce Manor, released on January 30, 2026, by Epitaph Records. The album follows their 2022 release, 40 oz. to Fresno, which marked the band's return after a pandemic-induced hiatus. The album was produced by Bad Religion co-founder Brett Gurewitz. Musically, the album expands their punk foundation with jangly rockabilly influences and keyboard-driven textures. Lyrically, frontman Barry Johnson draws on reflections of suburban Los Angeles life, personal experiences with loss, substance abuse, and nostalgia.

The album’s lead single, "All My Friends Are So Depressed" became the band’s first radio hit, peaking at number 19 on Billboard's Alternative Airplay chart. Critical reception was largely positive, with reviewers praising the band's consistency and energy. Joyce Manor will support the album with a headlining North American tour and performances at Coachella.

== Background ==
A decade deep into their career, the California punk trio Joyce Manor emerged from the pandemic with in 2022 with 40 oz. to Fresno. The Torrance, California band had established a devoted following through their presence in punk and emo scenes over the years. The pandemic forced a temporary hiatus from live performances, during which fan anticipation for their return grew. Observers noted that the band emerged from the period with increased visibility, exemplified by sold-out shows at the Hollywood Palladium and an appearance on Everybody's in LA, John Mulaney's Netflix talk show. The album and surrounding activity contributed to renewed interest in the band, allowing them to play larger venues than previously, a development bassist Matt Ebert described as part of the band's "slow burn" trajectory. In 2023, the band performed in amphitheaters and pavilions for the first time, serving as opening act on a summer tour with Weezer.

== Recording ==
For I Used to Go to This Bar, Epitaph Records founder Brett Gurewitz returned to work with the band as producer. It was mainly recorded at Dave's Room, a facility in North Hollywood, California. The band worked with a series of drummers, including Joey Waronker, known for his work with R.E.M. and Oasis, and they also included contributions from other musicians associated with Beck. Gurewitz emphasized precision and punch in his production style; guitarist Chase Knobbe later recalled that his demanding, rapid-fire approach pushed the band toward more confident performances. The band appreciated his role as both producer and mentor, crediting his guidance and temperament throughout the recording process. Barry Johnson noted that new material went through extensive revisions in his home demos, with many songs existing in multiple versions as he continually refined them.

The album is dedicated to Beach Boys founder Brian Wilson, who like the band grew up in the South Bay.

== Composition and artwork ==
The album augments the band's usual punk style with harmonica flourishes and jangly guitar textures, which Johnson called "L.A. rockabilly" or reminiscent of cowpunk. Brady Gerber, writing for the Los Angeles Times, observed that the album incorporates a variety of musical styles, including melodic pop-punk, country-tinged shuffles, and elements of classical and synth-based arrangements. The trio aimed to make each track distinct, experimenting with a variety of styles within the band's usual framework, including those rockabilly-inspired numbers, keyboard-driven tracks, and nods to Weezer-like power-pop. Johnson cited influences for the album as ranging from the Smiths, the Libertines, and X to contemporary artists such as 100 gecs. "Well, Whatever It Was" has been characterized as emblematic of Southern California's musical influences, citing elements reminiscent of Jane’s Addiction, Weezer, and the Red Hot Chili Peppers.

Barry Johnson described his songwriting process as building new material from older ideas, often reflecting on memories from 10 to 15 years prior, with concepts of existential anxiety and small moments of pleasure woven throughout. Some songs explore themes of substance abuse and loss, confronting personal experiences with alcoholism and drug use. Johnson has noted themes of financial precarity and creating personal happiness inform the lyrics, reflecting experiences from life in suburban L.A. Gurewitz praised Johnson's concise songwriting, drawing comparisons to Ernest Hemingway, Tim Armstrong, and Bruce Springsteen. He pushed the trio to include faster, more punk-oriented songs to round out the album, but Johnson felt burned out on uptempo songs. Despite his frustration, the band tried a sped-up version of "The Opossum" late in the process, and it ultimately won everyone over. This request also prompted the album's title track, which was inspired by the experience of passing by bars during the daytime. "I Know Where Mark Chen Lives" references Mark Chen, singer and songwriter for the bands Summer Vacation and Winter Break, with whom the band played shows with in their early days. The band revisited an early demo titled "Fuck Koalacaust" during preparations for setlists, ultimately reworking it into the track "Well, Don’t It Seem Like You’ve Been Here Before". After rediscovering the song, the members found it enjoyable to play and decided to record a refreshed arrangement during sessions for the new album.

Joyce Manor have frequently used vintage photography as a visual motif across their albums, and I Used to Go to This Bar continues this trend. The album cover was supplied by Chris Clean, a friend of the band, and depicts his grandmother decades earlier at a party. The band sought permission to use the photograph, citing its timeless, candid quality and its rich, detailed background.

== Release and reception ==
Professional ratings
Review scores
Source	Rating
Associated Press	2/5 stars
Kerrang!	4/5 stars
New Noise Magazine	4/5 stars
Our Culture	4/5 stars
Pitchfork	7.4/10

"All My Friends Are So Depressed" marked the band's first radio hit, peaking at number 19 on Billboard's Alternative Airplay chart.

Maya Georgi of Rolling Stone called it "a frenetic, in-your-face album [...] one of their best projects yet." Danielle Chelosky from Stereogum called the album another strong entry from a band that seems incapable of "put[ting] out a bad record." Joshua Mills from The Line of Best Fit concurred, calling it a "graceful merging of past, present, and future." Krysta Fauria of the Associated Press, in a negative review, called the collection a fun but derivative pop-punk retread. Sam Law in Kerrang! viewed it a "supremely listenable" installment from a trio "well into their groove." Reviewing for Pitchfork, Grace Robins-Somerville scored the album 7.4/10. Konstantinos Pappis of Our Culture scored the album as 4/5 stars, writing "Joyce Manor’s latest is proof that reminiscing can mean the opposite of going back". Kayla Moreno of New Noise Magazine described the album as "a promising start to 2026 for alternative music at large".

In support of the album, the band mounted a headlining tour alongside Militarie Gun and Teen Mortgage across North America in early 2026. They played Coachella, their first time at the festival in a decade. Afterwards, they supported Hot Mulligan on a mid-year outing in the U.S.

In November 2026, the album was named as Rock Sound's Album of the Year.

== Track listing ==
All tracks are written by Joyce Manor.

No.	Title	Length
1.	"I Know Where Mark Chen Lives"	1:50
2.	"Falling Into It"	1:50
3.	"All My Friends Are So Depressed"	2:42
4.	"Well, Whatever It Was"	2:06
5.	"I Used to Go to This Bar"	2:12
6.	"After All You Put Me Through"	2:18
7.	"The Opossum"	1:58
8.	"Well, Don't It Seem Like You've Been Here Before?"	1:54
9.	"Grey Guitar"	2:13
Total length:		19:03

== Personnel ==
Credits adapted from Bandcamp and Tidal.

=== Joyce Manor ===
- Matt Ebert – background vocals, performance
- Barry Johnson – vocals, background vocals
- Chase Knobbe – background vocals, performance

=== Additional contributors ===
- Brett Gurewitz – production, background vocals
- Clint Welander – engineering (tracks 2, 6)
- Paul Figueroa – engineering (2–5, 7–9)
- Farrokh Sheriff – engineering assistance (2, 6)
- Steve Olmon – engineering assistance (2–5, 7–9)
- Sergio Chavez – additional engineering, editing
- Raul "Riff" Cuellar – additional engineering
- Matt Malpass – additional engineering
- Tom Lord-Alge – mixing (1, 3–5, 8, 9)
- Tony Hoffer – mixing (2, 6, 7)
- Ted Jensen – mastering
- Neil Berthier – background vocals
- Lenny Castro – percussion
- Jared Shavelson – drums (1, 8)
- Joey Waronker – drums (2, 4, 7, 9)
- Dave Hidalgo Jr. – drums (3, 5, 6)
- Rob Schnapf – guitar (6)
- Evan Bernard – guitar (9)

== Charts ==
Chart performance for I Used to Go to This Bar
Chart (2026)	Peak position
UK Album Downloads (Official Charts)	76
UK Independent Albums (Official Charts)	42
UK Record Store (OCC)	20
US Top Album Sales (Billboard)	23
