= Songs from Northern Torrance =

Compilation album by Joyce Manor
- Released: May 29, 2020
- Genres: Pop-punk; folk punk
- Length: 14:52
- Label: Epitaph

Joyce Manor chronology
Million Dollars to Kill Me (2018)	Songs from Northern Torrance (2020)	40 oz. to Fresno (2022)

Songs from Northern Torrance is a compilation album by the American pop-punk band Joyce Manor. It was released through Epitaph Records on May 29, 2020, as a 45 RPM 12" LP and a digital download.

== Background ==
Joyce Manor formed in northern Torrance, California in 2008, "purportedly ... following a drunken conversation between [frontman Barry] Johnson and fellow guitarist Chase Knobbe in the Disneyland parking lot", naming themselves "after an apartment complex near ... Johnson's home".

Side A compiles early demos from 2008 and 2009 with Johnson and Knobbe joined by drummer Chris Torres, whilst side B contains the entirety of the 2010 Constant Headache EP, seeing Matt Ebert join on bass and Kurt Walcher replacing Torres on drums.

== Style ==
Critics contrasted the gritty, "grimy", and "stripped-down" punk and "lo-fi charm" of Joyce Manor's earlier work with their later "refined" and "polished", noting the split between the "lighthearted, sometimes screamy folk punk" side A with the inclusion of fan-favorites like "House Warning Party" and the "full-bore screamo punk-pop", "fuck-it-all angsty classics" of the Constant Headache EP on side B.

== Critical reception ==
Professional ratings
Review scores
Source	Rating
AllMusic	3.5/5 stars
Paste	8.4/10
Pitchfork	7.2/10

Arielle Gordon of Pitchfork said it comes "closest to Johnson's elusive holy grail of punk", also noting that "the compilation's abrasive edge evokes the basements, bowling alleys, and backyards that dot Joyce Manor's southern California home", and AllMusic's Timothy Monger said it "feels like an archaeological dig into the grimy punk basements of West Coast suburbia."

== Track listing ==
=== Side A ===
No.	Title	Original release	Length
1.	"House Warning Party"	Joyce Manor demo	1:04
2.	"Fuck Koalacaust"	Joyce Manor demo	1:44
3.	"DFHP?"	Joyce Manor / Summer Vacation split 7"	0:41
4.	"Danke Schoen"	previous unreleased demo	1:50
5.	"Who Gave You a Baby"	previous unreleased demo	0:54
Total length:			6:13

=== Side B ===
No.	Title	Original release	Length
1.	"Constant Nothing"	Constant Headache EP	1:27
2.	"Done Right Discount Flooring"	Constant Headache EP	1:21
3.	"Five Beer Plan"	Constant Headache EP	1:56
4.	"Chumped"	Constant Headache EP	1:38
5.	"Leather Jacket"	Constant Headache EP	2:17
Total length:			8:39; 14:52

== Personnel ==
=== Joyce Manor ===
- Barry Johnson – vocals, guitar
- Chase Knobbe – guitar, backing vocals
- Matt Ebert (side B) – bass, backing vocals
- Chris Torres (side A) – drums ("House Warning Party", "Fuck Koalacaust", "Danke Schoen"), backing vocals ("Danke Shoen")
- Kurt Walcher (side B) – drums

=== Technical personnel ===
- Alex Estrada (side B) – producer, recording engineer
- Bill Cutts – recording engineer ("House Warning Party", "Fuck Koalacaust")
