= Of All Things I Will Soon Grow Tired =

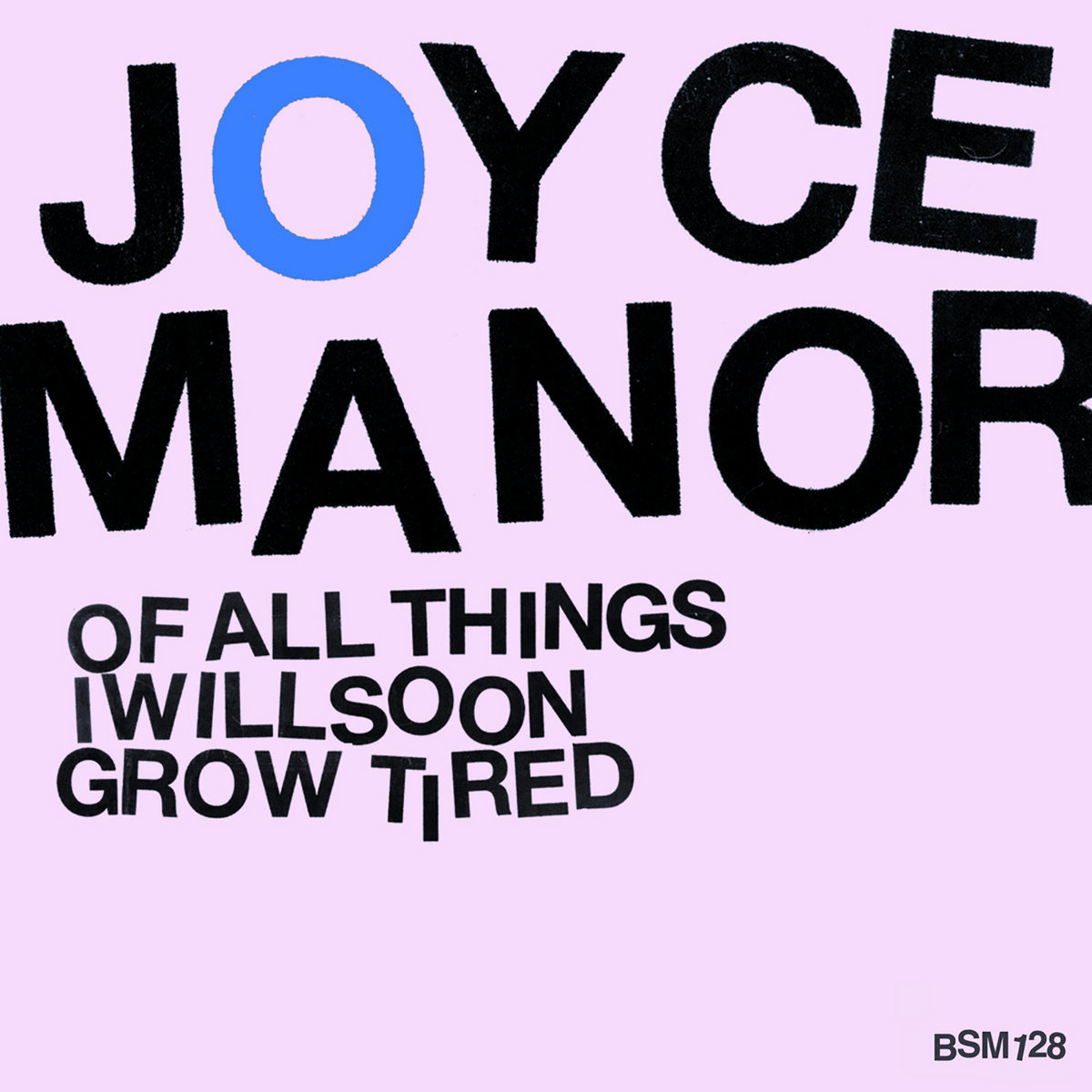

Studio album by Joyce Manor
- Released: April 14, 2012
- Genres: Indie rock; punk rock; lo-fi; folk punk
- Length: 13:04
- Labels: Asian Man; Big Scary Monsters
- Producers: Joyce Manor; Jack Shirley; Alex Estrada

Joyce Manor chronology
Joyce Manor (2011)	Of All Things I Will Soon Grow Tired (2012)	Never Hungover Again (2014)

Singles from Of All Things I Will Soon Grow Tired
- 1. "Violent Inside" Released: February 23rd, 2012

Of All Things I Will Soon Grow Tired is the second studio album by American pop punk band Joyce Manor released on April 14, 2012, through Asian Man Records. During recording, frontman Barry Johnson was focused on pushing beyond the band's pop-punk roots, deliberately leaning into more esoteric and unconventional influences in an effort to prove their credibility. Musically, the album incorporates lo-fi and folk-punk elements, marking a distinct stylistic shift from their previous record. It also includes a cover of the Buggles’ 1979 single "Video Killed the Radio Star". The album was produced by Jack Shirley.

While fan reaction was divided, critics generally praised the album for its experimental and idiosyncratic qualities, though many have come to regard it as an outlier in their discography. To support the release, Joyce Manor toured extensively, playing shows with bands such as AJJ, Algernon Cadwallader, Touche Amore, and Hop Along. Running just 13 minutes long, Of All Things remains the band’s shortest album.

== Background ==
The band's debut, self-titled album saw release in January 2011, and included the single "Constant Headache", which became their signature song. Though pop-punk had largely faded from the commercial spotlight, the band's popularity rose through word-of-mouth from fans online, particularly on Tumblr. Punknews named it their "2011 Album of the Year" and it landed the band on many year-end best-of lists.

The group were approached by venerated imprint Asian Man Records for their next album, and the group felt pressured at the thought of letting down a label they respected. In response, Joyce Manor rushed into the studio to record their sophomore album, their eagerness for the label's approval leading the band to prioritize speed over quality. The album was produced by Jack Shirley, who went on to produce Deafheaven's 2013 album Sunbather. Big Scary Monsters handled overseas distribution for the LP.

=== Creative challenges ===
"I was really concerned with being [...] accepted by the cool kids, and I really wanted to prove that we’re like not just a pop punk band, so I was really leaning into the more esoteric and weird shit and trying to rep like Wire, or Young Marble Giants, like, ‘I have a cool record collection, I swear to god!'"

— Barry Johnson, in an interview with BrooklynVegan

Barry Johnson, frontman of Joyce Manor, called the album "a pain to make," describing it as a product of confusion and creative indecision. He has called the album an "identity crisis", noting it was made to differentiate themselves from other pop-punk bands. "We didn’t want to be a Warped Tour band," said Johnson. He had developed a complex about the label, and Of All Things was born from this desire to "do something weird and bum people out." He later conceded that his worry over credibility was absurd, but admitted that "I was just really aware that people were gonna be listening to it [and] concerned with being cool. I was kind of trying to sabotage my career." In a sense, his goal was to "own" it being received poorly, rather than risk rejection. He has apologized in several interviews for the album.

== Composition and artwork ==
Of All Things I Will Soon Grow Tired is marked by its eclectic, lo-fi sound, drawing on elements of folk punk, indie rock, and punk. The album has been likened to a sonic collage, and has been called eclectic and unpredictable. Andrew Sacher, writing for Brooklyn Vegan, noted that it mixes the lo-fi conciseness of Guided by Voices with Jawbreaker-style punk. The album also contains a cover of the Buggles' 1979 single "Video Killed the Radio Star", one of Johnson's favorite pop songs. Johnson later heard from a fan that Trevor Horn, who co-wrote the song, was appreciative of the cover.

It contains bits and pieces of demos, which Johnson later acknowledged could have benefited from more time and careful execution. To that end, "See How Tame I Can Be", originally recorded with a drum machine, was later reworked into "Tame", which was released on split 7" with fellow Californian punkers Toys That Kill in 2014. "These Kind of Ice Skates" opens the album by throwing listeners directly into the action, a conscious decision Johnson compared to a sudden plunge into cold water.

The album artwork was originally planned under the working title Father's Rights and was to feature an illustrated cover depicting a stoned hippie. Both the name and artwork were later abandoned after receiving an muted response from friends. The final album title was instead drawn from a line in the lyrics, which frontman Barry Johnson cited as thematically resonant with the material on the record. The final cover design adopted a minimalist approach, featuring enlarged, irregular typography on a pink background, developed in collaboration with designer Scott Arnold. The inclusion of a blue letter "O" has been noted as resembling the Germs’ GI logo; Johnson later acknowledged the similarity as an unintentional homage.

== Reception ==
Professional ratings
Review scores
Source	Rating
Absolute Punk	92%
AllMusic	4/5 stars
Alter the Press!	4/5 stars
Punknews.org	4/5 stars

Of All Things I Will Soon Grow Tired was released on April 14, 2012. At the time, other acts such as Cloud Nothings and Japandroids were gaining attention with punk- and emo-influenced indie rock. Johnson nearly immediately regretted the direction the band took with the album, remarking in 2012 that "I'm really, really happy with it, don’t get me wrong, but at the same time I wish we would have just done a punk record." The reaction from their fanbase was swift and divided. It was praised in some corners for its experimental touches, and it became a fan favorite for some.

Among the press, the album generally received positive reviews. AllMusic's Tim Sendra jokingly called it "sounds a bit like how Weezer might have turned out if they had a recording budget of about ten dollars and never left their parents' basement," but said the album was "all glory, no boredom" and songs like "Video Killed the Radio Star" was "delivering exactly the right amount of emotional jolt". Danielle Chelosky of Stereogum viewed it as a distinctive and idiosyncratic entry in the band’s discography, dubbing it a "fuzzed-out, folky indie-rock acid trip." Ian Cohen, for the same publication, called it their weakest album, and observed that "seven of its nine songs are less than 100 seconds." Andrew Sacher, writing for Brooklyn Vegan, dubbed it "a raw, eccentric, challenging record [...] It's the Pinkerton to Joyce Manor‘s Blue Album."

In support, the band played shows with AJJ, Algernon Cadwallader, Touche Amore, Hop Along, and Desaparecidos. The band also supported Against Me, and toured Australia with The Smith Street Band.

Sparrow Sleeps, a children's music group, later referenced the album with this I Hope This Child Will Soon Grow Tired (2017), a collection of lullabies.

== Track listing ==
All music is composed by Joyce Manor except where noted.

No.	Title	Length
1.	"These Kind Of Ice Skates"	1:19
2.	"Comfortable Clothes"	1:04
3.	"See How Tame I Can Be!"	1:29
4.	"Drainage"	1:11
5.	"Video Killed The Radio Star" (Geoff Downes, Trevor Horn, Bruce Woolley)	2:16
6.	"If I Needed You There"	1:07
7.	"Bride Of Usher"	2:19
8.	"Violent Inside"	1:30
9.	"I'm Always Tired"	0:49
Total length:		13:04

== Personnel ==
Joyce Manor

- Barry Johnson – vocals, guitar
- Chase Knobbe – guitar
- Matt Ebert – bass, backing vocals
- Kurt Walcher – drums

Additional personnel

- Joyce Manor – production
- Jack Shirley – production, recording, engineering
- Alex Estrada – production
