= Last You Heard of Me =

Single by Joyce Manor

from the album Cody
- Released: September 14, 2016
- Genre: Punk rock; indie rock
- Length: 3:08
- Label: Epitaph
- Songwriters: Barry Johnson; Chase Knobbe; Jeff Enzor; Matt Ebert
- Producer: Rob Schnapf

Joyce Manor singles chronology
"Fake I.D." (2016)	"Last You Heard of Me" (2016)	"Eighteen" (2016)

"Last You Heard of Me" is a song recorded by the American rock band Joyce Manor. The song was released on September 14, 2016, through Epitaph Records, as the second single from the band's fourth studio album, Cody. "Last You Heard of Me" recounts a predictable night at a karaoke bar that ends in a regretful romantic entanglement. Though it shares songwriting credits between the band members, the song was largely written by frontman Barry Johnson. Its tangential lyrical style was inspired by the work of Mark Kozelek and based on a sense of ennui and lethargy with drunken nights.

Critics enjoyed "Last You Heard of Me", with many singling out its slow-building storyline for praise. Its punk sound was often likened to Weezer. Its music video was directed by Christopher Good and depicts a Clue-style dinner party gone wrong at a mansion called "Joyce Manor".

== Background ==
"Last You Heard of Me" shares songwriting credits between all of the members of Joyce Manor at that time, though it was primarily written by frontman Barry Johnson. He penned the song's lyrics during an inspired weeklong session in November 2015, during which he came up with many of the other songs on Cody, the song's parent album. Most of the songs required little revision: "They were all coming out finished. [...] I couldn't really tell you what or why, though. Nothing in my life happened. I'm not sure I was consciously reflecting on anything," Johnson remembered. The song's direct lyrical approach was inspired by the work of Mark Kozelek. Musically, the song has frequently been likened to Weezer.

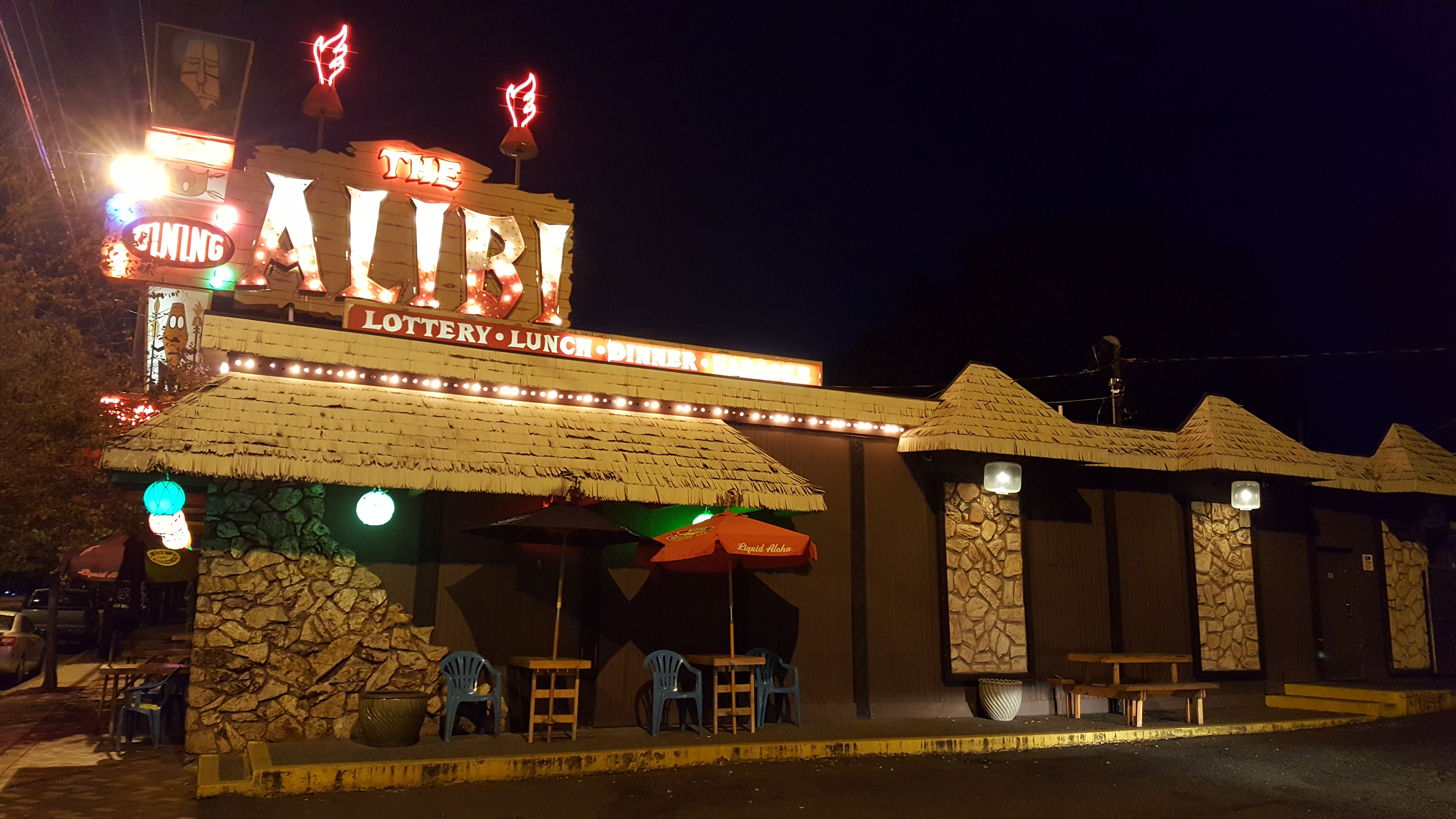
The Alibi bar in 2016.

The song's unusual structure eschews a chorus for a linear and tangential style, following a storyline that builds slowly throughout the song. Johnson narrates in first person from the Alibi in Portland, Oregon, where he waits in line for karaoke requests in-between drinks. He follows behind Sonia, a friend or love interest, to smoke weed; he abhors "the stuff," opting instead for a cigarette. Outside, he locks eyes with a muse—perhaps implied to be a previous lover—and as the instrumental builds, Johnson recounts in flashes the rest of the evening: "Start to finish sad defeat / Shivering, lying next to you / And that's the last you heard of me."

== Release and reception ==
Epitaph issued "Last You Heard of Me" as the second single from Cody on September 14, 2016. Its music video, directed by Christopher Good, depicts a mansion dinner party gone wrong. Anna Gaca from Spin described the clip: "Something evil is afoot, and the baroque salon quickly devolves into a Clue-style whodunnit bloodbath."

Contemporary music critics enjoyed "Last You Heard of Me". Spin's Kyle McGovern called it a "deeply satisfying bit of pop-punk." At Stereogum, Collin Robinson wrote: "Joyce Manor have a way of communicating some devastating sentiments with a subtlety that makes for sneaky potency." Tanner Smith, writing for PopMatters, extolled the tune as the band's "most mature, focused, and clear statement". The song's slow-burning conclusion was often singled out for praise. Jon Caramanica from the New York Times described the surprise ending: "[The song] is the first place of this album that feels stagnant. But then, [it] suddenly accelerates at the end. Johnson has snapped out of it, or more to the point, woken up." Quinn Moreland, for Pitchfork, complimented the finale's "would-be epiphany": "In every two-minute story, the stakes are high, and this pushes each track to discover some sort of clarity by the conclusion. On Cody, these realizations are rarely happy, and Joyce Manor ask their fans to follow them to a darker place than before." Danielle Chelosky, also of Stereogum, suggested the ending "showcases their skill for a rewarding payoff."

== Personnel ==
Joyce Manor

- Barry Johnson – guitar, vocals, songwriting
- Chase Knobbe – guitar, songwriting
- Jeff Enzor – drums, songwriting
- Matt Ebert – bass guitar, songwriting

Production

- Rob Schnapf – production
- Brain Rosemeyer – recording engineer
- Mark Chalecki – mastering engineer
