= Constant Headache =

2011 song by Joyce Manor

Song by Joyce Manor

from the album Joyce Manor
- Released: January 11, 2011
- Genre: Indie rock; emo
- Length: 3:04
- Label: 6131
- Songwriters: Barry Johnson; Matt Ebert; Chase Knobbe; Kurt Walcher
- Producer: Alex Estrada

"Constant Headache" is a song about a one-night stand that was recorded by American rock band Joyce Manor. The song was released on January 11, 2011, as part of their self-titled debut album. It was also the namesake of the group's extended play of the same name, first released a year prior. The song is generally considered the band's signature song.

== Background ==
Like many tracks on the band's debut, the song was developed over a period of many years. An early version of the song exists with an additional third verse, though Johnson has joked it would be too unusual to release, given fans' love of the original. He has admitted in an interview that the song's melody was inspired by the Human League's "Don't You Want Me Baby". Listeners have theorized that the song's lyrics were written from the perspective of a dog, though Johnson has expressed confusion at this: "I can't pin down exactly which line it is that suggests that. Clearly, there's something there because it's too strange of a coincidence." As to the lyrics, "It's rare that Joyce Manor refer directly to sex, but on the second verse, [the singer] shouts, 'You having sex in the morning, your love was foreign to me It made me think maybe human's not such a bad thing to be.' For a moment, everything is uncomplicated and beautiful, only to be followed by a real gut-punch: 'But I just laid there in protest, entirely fucked It's such a stubborn reminder one perfect night's not enough'[.]"

== Reception ==
"Constant Headache" rapidly became the band's most popular song, a frequent encore at their concerts. Johnson remembered in an interview that the lyrics of the song, combined with GIF images from the band's shows, spread on social media sites like Tumblr, including early word-of-mouth for the act.

Chris Payne at Billboard considered it the album's "biggest anthem," pointing out humorously that while the majority of its songs were fast and short, "Constant Headache" is the only song to stretch to three minutes. Spin contributor Brad Nelson retrospectively dubbed it "still their most enduring song, a knot of feeling shoved forward by its own chord progression, punk as temporary and awesome as a wave on beach." Whitney Shoemaker of Alternative Press recalled it as one of the most distinctive emo songs of 2011.

== Cover versions ==
The song has been covered by Conor Oberst's Desaparecidos.

Tigers Jaw (Ben Walsh and Brianna Collins) released a cover version in 2023.

== In popular culture ==
The Bear used the Tigers Jaw cover in the 2024 episode "Apologies," playing in the scene where Neil and Ted Fak go to court Claire on Carmy's behalf.
