= French Vanilla (band) =

American art punk band

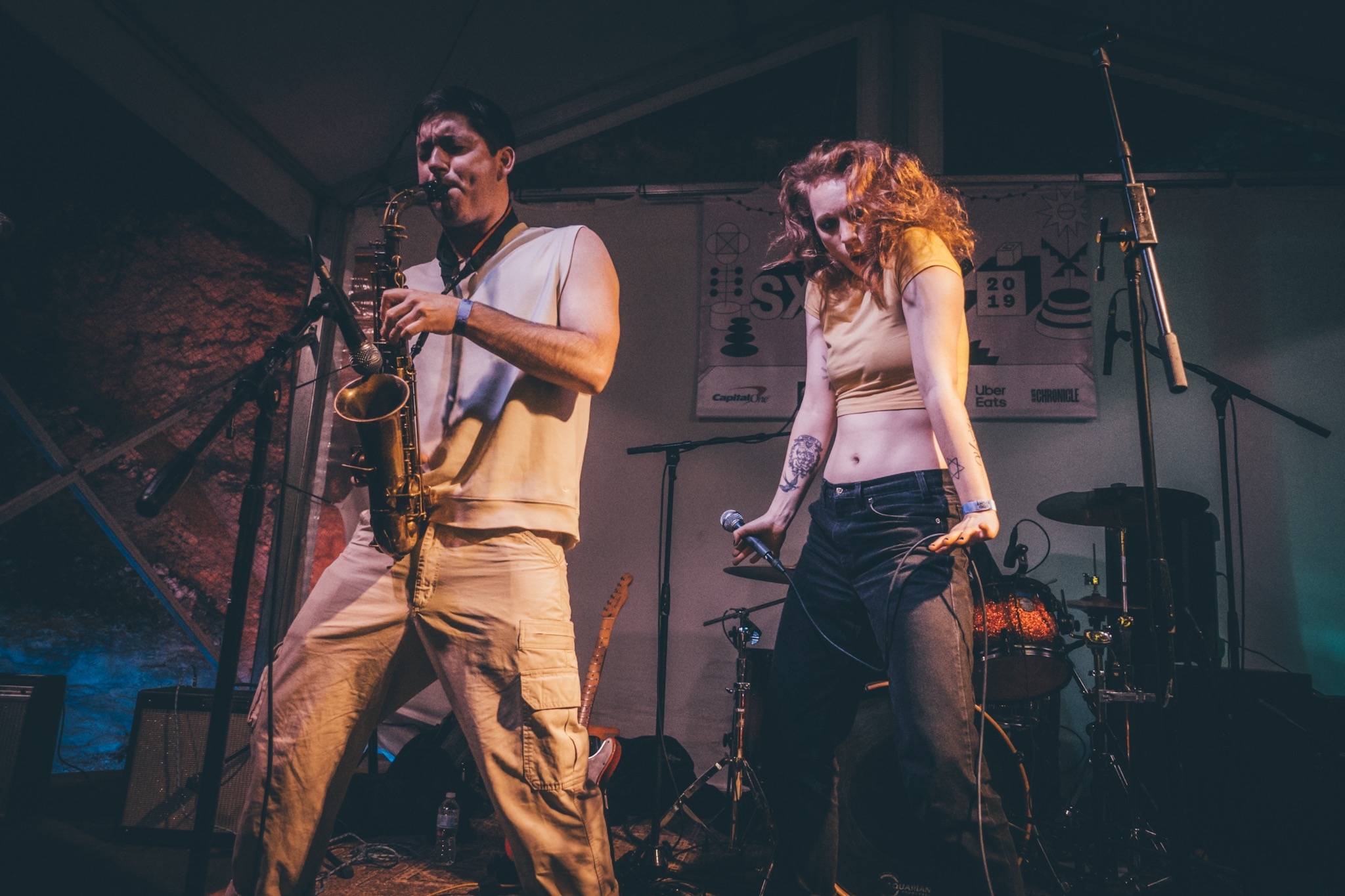

Background information
- Origin: Los Angeles, California, United States
- Genre: art punk
- Label: Danger Collective
- Members: Sally Spitz; Ali Day; Daniel Trautfield; Greg Shilton
- Past members: Max Albeck

French Vanilla are an American art punk band consisting of Sally Spitz (vocals), Ali Day (guitar), Daniel Trautfield (saxophone, bass), and Greg Shilton (drums).

== History ==
French Vanilla were formed in 2013 by UCLA undergrads Sally Spitz, Ali Day, Daniel Trautfield and Max Albeck. They released their self-titled debut album in 2017.

The band released their second album, How Am I Not Myself? to generally positive reviews. Zach Schonfeld of Pitchfork gave the record a 7.2/10 rating, stating that "What it lacks in stylistic diversity it makes up with sustained and unrelenting energy", while Lee Adcock of Under the Radar wrote that "On all fronts, French Vanilla have scored a serious win here", awarding the album 8/10.

== Discography ==
Albums

- French Vanilla (2017)
- How Am I Not Myself? (2019)
