= Joyce Manor (album) =

Studio album by Joyce Manor
- Released: January 11, 2011
- Recorded: September 2010
- Studios: Earth Capital, LA
- Genres: Punk rock; indie rock; pop-punk; emo
- Length: 18:42
- Labels: 6131; Asian Man
- Producer: Alex Estrada

Joyce Manor chronology
Joyce Manor (2011)	Of All Things I Will Soon Grow Tired (2012)

Joyce Manor (sometimes referred to as S/T) is the debut studio album by American rock band Joyce Manor, released by 6131 on January 11, 2011.

== Background ==
Pop punk band Joyce Manor emerged in the late 2000s from Torrance, California, the pairing of vocalist/guitarist Barry Johnson and guitarist Chase Knobbe. The duo added Matt Ebert on bass and Kurt Walcher on drums in 2009. The band began playing with local group Summer Vacation, which aided in a gravitation towards emo music. Early influences included The Smiths, Guided by Voices, and Rancid.

The band signed to 6131 Records, who gave the group a budget of one thousand dollars to record their first full-length. Since the label was gaining significant attention at the time due to the success of Touché Amoré, they saw an opportunity to create a record that would reach a wider audience. Johnson, then 24, compiled songs he had composed over various years, including some dating to his teenage years. He viewed the debut as a greatest hits of sorts, a collection of his best work to date. When asked to summarize the lyrical themes, Johnson pointed to concepts like "boredom, repeating the same mistakes over and over, eating too much candy, sexual depression, regular depression, fifteen VHS tapes for five dollars, that sorta thing."

== Recording and release history ==
The album's recording was split between two studios; guitar tracks and vocals were digitally recorded in September 2010 at Earth Capital in Los Angeles with producer Alex Estrada, while the drums and bass were tracked at his father's all-analog facility in Lake Arrowhead with engineer Jon Gollihugh. "All the songs were infectious, but also really energetic and we were really excited, so that comes through on the takes," Johnson observed. The group aimed to emulate the sound of Weezer's 1996 album Pinkerton, particularly the spacious way drums were tracked on that LP. Johnson requested Estrada distort his vocal tracks, due to personal pressure: "Maybe I was trying to cover my voice up a little bit because I was insecure," he admitted.

=== Remix (2021) ===
To mark its tenth anniversary, the band released a remixed edition of the album, overseen by Estrada. The band had long expressed reservations about the original sound, noting that the songs' brisk tempos and the drum tone often buried finer details in the mix. In a 2012 interview, Johnson critiqued the digital and analog combination: "I really wish we would have done all digital or all tape because it sounds unlike any other recording I’ve ever heard—maybe not in a good way. Maybe there is a reason other records don’t sound like that. It’s really unnerving that some of it has this warmth and some of it doesn’t." The updated release strips away drum effects, corrects phasing issues on the guitars, among several other alterations. According to Ebert, the aim was not to replace the original recording, but to enhance its clarity and fidelity. Music critic Ian Cohen described the result as "one of the most radical remasters" he had heard.

== Composition ==
"Orange Julius", the minute-long album opener, introduces a manic, dissonant style with bashing chords and a menacing tone, which Barry Johnson described as a revenge fantasy told from the perspective of a shy, bullied girl. "Constant Headache"'s melody was inspired by the Human League's "Don't You Want Me Baby".

== Artwork ==
The album's cover art is a vintage photograph depicting a group of children. The image was discovered among old family photographs recovered by Johnson’s grandfather during a visit to his former home in England. The photograph appealed to the band because of its striking composition and direct eye contact from the center child, which they felt evoked the aesthetic of British album covers by artists such as the Smiths, as well as elements of punk and hardcore imagery. Designer Scott Arnold assisted with layout, drawing inspiration from Blue Note jazz album covers, including the use of formal typography, serial numbers, and the placement of the track listing on the front cover.

== Reception ==
=== Critical reception ===
Professional ratings
Review scores
Source	Rating
Pitchfork	8.5/10
Punknews.org	4.5/5

Chris DeVille at Stereogum describe the record as "Cali pop-punk crossbred with ripshit lo-fi indie rock, spiked with traces of the Smiths, the Thermals, and especially early Weezer."

Danielle Chelosky at Alternative Press referred to it as "beloved," while Jonah Krueger at Consequence dubbed it "iconic."

In a retrospective piece for Pitchfork, Ian Cohen called the album legendary, "ten entirely quotable, all-hook songs in 18 minutes." Cohen opined that Joyce Manor, with its brisk and immediate pace, "set the course for its foreseeable future, anticipating a decade of social media and streaming trends that rewarded immediacy and the perpetual bite-sizing of attention spans."

=== Audience reception ===
Joyce Manor attracted a cult following, with a leaked copy generating publicity. The group's rise to fame was aided by fans on the social platform Tumblr, many of which "shar[ed] gifs, lyric quotes, and glitchy live videos" to further the band's message.

Johnson spoke on the album's impact in 2021:

It was such an interesting little pocket of time. It was after people were buying CDs but before Spotify. There was that Tumblr or MediaFire blogs window of culture, when that was how people found out about bands. There wasn’t as much of an algorithm. It was interesting because it was by the kids for the kids, which was nice.

== Track listing ==
All music is composed by Joyce Manor.

No.	Title	Length
1.	"Orange Julius"	1:16
2.	"Call Out (Laundry)"	2:00
3.	"Beach Community"	1:40
4.	"Derailed"	1:43
5.	"Famous Friend"	1:30
6.	"Leather Jacket"	2:14
7.	"21st Dead Rats"	1:33
8.	"Constant Nothing"	1:24
9.	"Ashtray Petting Zoo"	2:18
10.	"Constant Headache"	3:04
Total length:		18:42

== Personnel ==
=== Joyce Manor ===
- Barry Johnson – vocals, guitar
- Chase Knobbe – guitar
- Matt Ebert – bass, backing vocals
- Kurt Walcher – drums

=== Technical personnel ===
- Alex Estrada – production, recording engineer
- Paul Miner – mastering engineer
- Scott Arnold – design
