= Joyce Manor =

American punk rock band

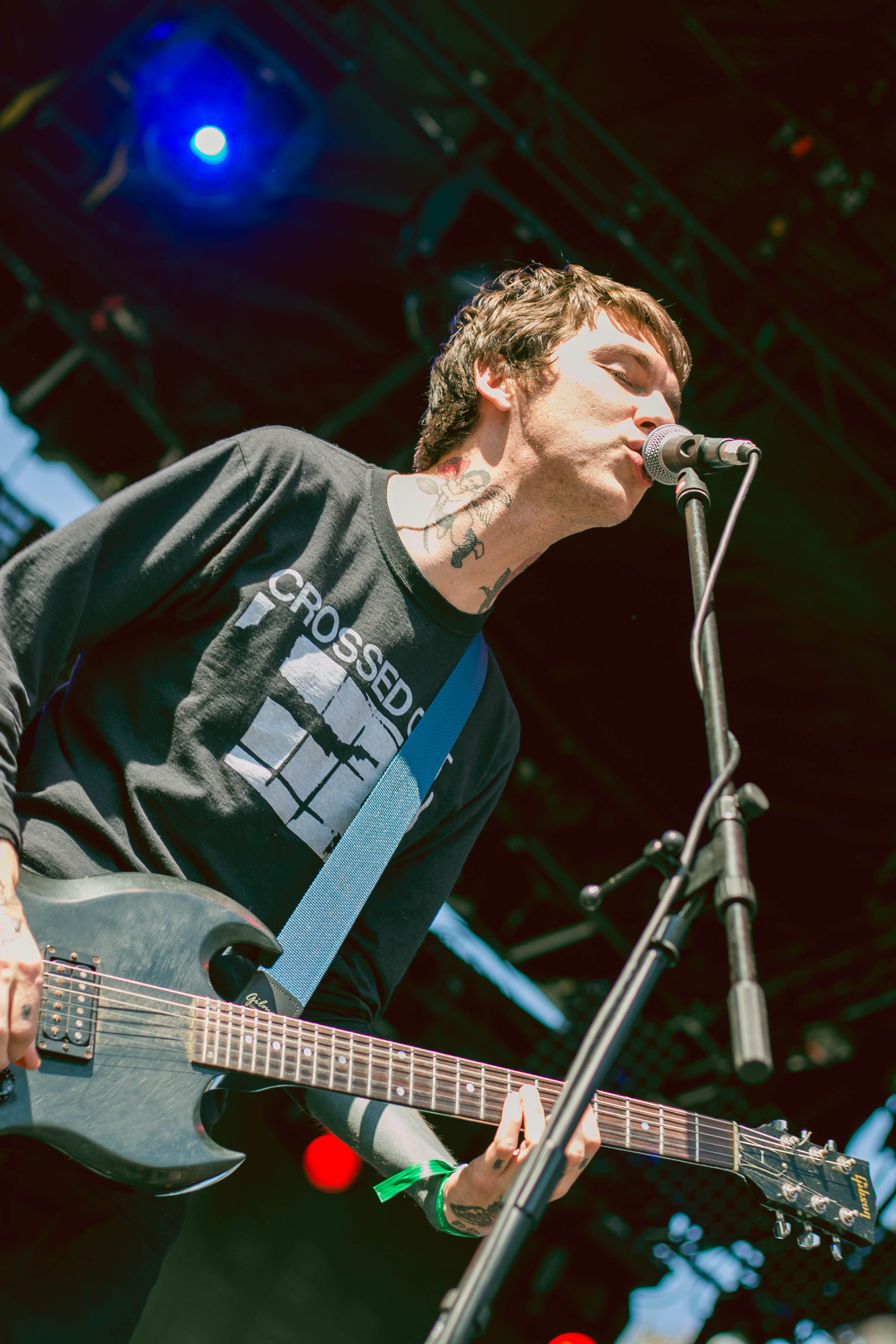

Background information
- Origin: Torrance, California, U.S.
- Genres: Punk rock; emo; pop-punk; indie rock; power pop; alternative rock
- Years active: 2008–present
- Labels: Asian Man; 6131; Epitaph; Big Scary Monsters
- Members: Barry Johnson; Chase Knobbe; Matt Ebert
- Past members: Kurt Walcher; Jeff Enzor; Pat Ware
- Website: joyce-manor.com

Joyce Manor is an American punk rock band, formed in Torrance, California, in 2008. The band's current lineup consists of singer-songwriter and guitarist Barry Johnson; guitarist Chase Knobbe; and bassist/backing vocalist Matt Ebert. The band's musical style is rooted in punk rock, though it has diversified over the course of its career. The band first gained momentum through word-of-mouth and early exposure on social media. The group has had a different drummer for each album cycle since 2015.

The band has released six studio albums, each typically short in duration. Their 2011 self-titled debut, featuring the song "Constant Headache", was released through indie label 6131; its 2012 follow-up, Of All Things I Will Soon Grow Tired, was distributed through Asian Man. The band signed a long-term contract with Epitaph Records, with which the band first released Never Hungover Again in 2014. The band explored different song structures and tempos on Cody (2016) and Million Dollars to Kill Me (2018). They released the stopgap compilation Songs from Northern Torrance in 2020, and follow-up 40 oz. to Fresno, in 2022. Its most recent album, I Used to Go to This Bar, was released in 2026.

The staff of Consequence ranked the band at number 25 on their list of "The 100 Best Pop Punk Bands" in 2019.

== History ==
=== Early history (2008–2013) ===
Joyce Manor originated out of Torrance, California, part of the longstanding punk rock scene in the state. Guitarists Barry Johnson and Chase Knobbe first met and bonded in late 2008, and decided to form a band on a trip to Disneyland. The band's name came from an apartment building Johnson would pass on walks. The duo adopted an acoustic, folk-punk sound, and began playing house shows; their first gig was opening for Andrew Jackson Jihad. Their sound evolved upon adding bassist Matt Ebert and drummer Kurt Walcher in 2009, and they began releasing demos.

While the band were never fully part of a formal scene in California, they frequently played with local bands such as Summer Vacation (later Winter Break) at venues like VLHS and 12th and G. As they grew in prominence, they became part of the broader emo revival scene that included bands like Tigers Jaw, the Menzingers, Title Fight, and Touché Amoré. In 2010, the band signed with 6131 Records, who gave the foursome a small budget to tackle their first full-length. The band's debut, self-titled album saw release in January 2011, and included the single "Constant Headache", which became their signature song. Though pop-punk had largely faded from the commercial spotlight, the band's popularity rose through word-of-mouth from fans online, particularly on Tumblr. Punknews.org named it their "2011 Album of the Year" and it landed the band on many year-end best-of lists.

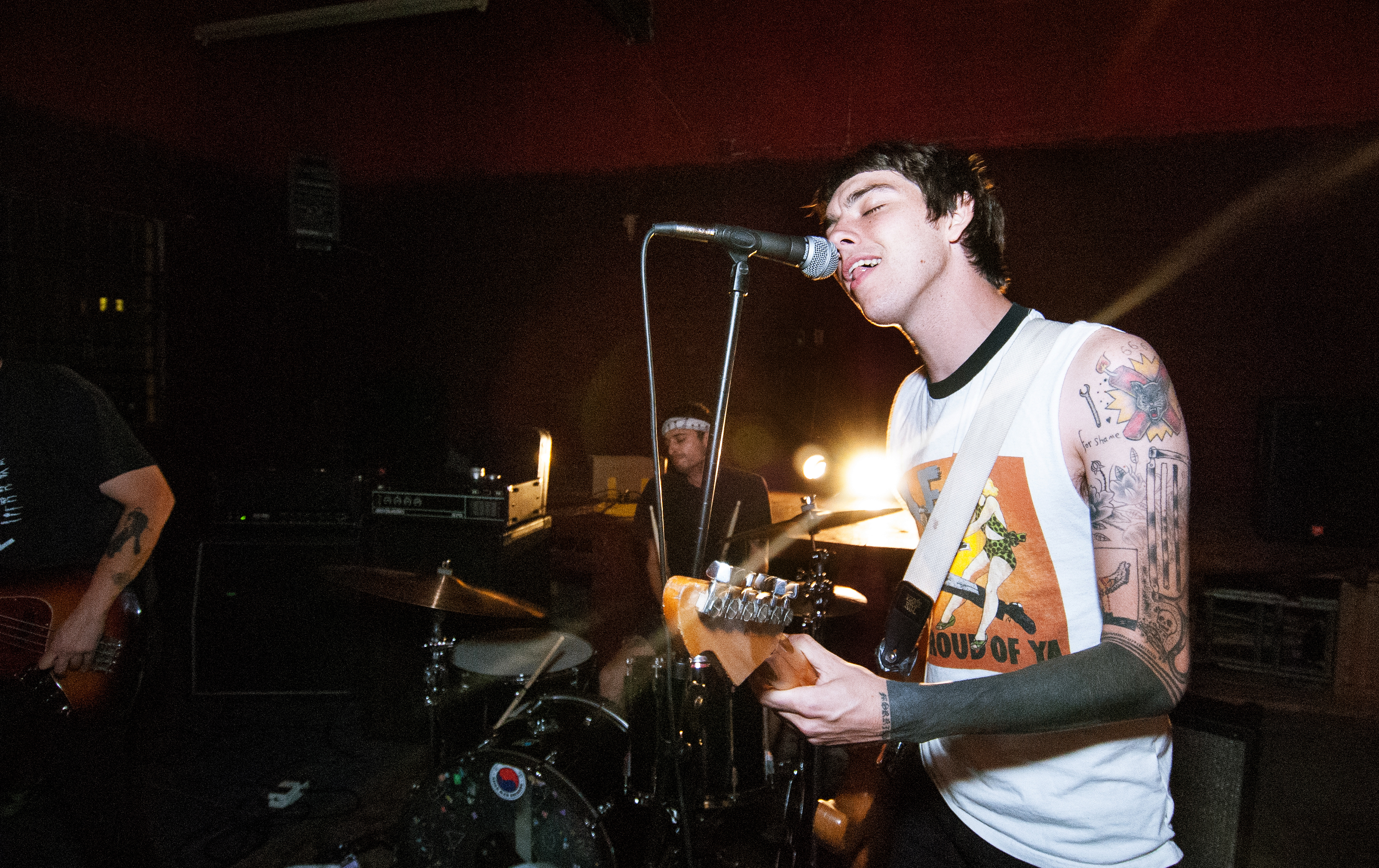
Joyce Manor performing in 2012.

Johnson was uncomfortable with the attention, and channeled his angst into the band's next offering, 2012's Of All Things I Will Soon Grow Tired, a thirteen-minute thrash that explores its folk-punk roots and included a cover of the Buggles' "Video Killed the Radio Star". The group partnered with venerated imprint Asian Man Records for the release; Big Scary Monsters handled overseas distribution. The reaction from their fanbase was swift and divided; Johnson called the album a pain to make, later confessing that he felt a pull to distinguish themselves from their contemporaries: "We didn’t want to be a Warped Tour band," he admitted. "I was just really aware that people were gonna be listening to it [and] concerned with being cool. I was kind of trying to sabotage my career." In support, the band played shows with AJJ, Algernon Cadwallader, Touche Amore, Hop Along, and Desaparecidos. The band also supported Against Me. The band's friends at Asian Man connected them with the staff at Epitaph Records, the fabled punk label, with whom the band signed to in 2014.

=== Never Hungover Again: critical success and a move to Epitaph (2014–2019) ===
The band's first album for Epitaph was Never Hungover Again (2014), a release that united listenership and invited new fans. Produced by Joe Reinhart, Never Hungover Again represented the band's career-best ranking on the Billboard 200 at number 106. Around the same time, the band received attention within the indie and punk communities for its stance against stage diving after the band interrupted several sets to call out stage divers. Rolling Stone included the band on its "10 New Artists You Need to Know" in 2014. Never Hungover Again earned rave reviews from music critics, cementing the band's place as one of the top pop-punk bands of the 2010s; they were credited with spearheading a revival of emo music alongside acts like Title Fight and Tigers Jaw. The band played shows in support of the album with Brand New, as well as their first-ever headlining slots alongside Toys That Kill, Mitski, and Modern Baseball.

In 2016, the band released their next album, Cody, produced by Rob Schnapf. It was supported by the singles "Fake I.D.", "Eighteen", and "Last You Heard of Me". For the album, the band dismissed Walcher; the members felt he did not connect with the band's songwriting. It became one in a string of percussionists sitting in with the group; Johnson recruited Jeff Enzor for Cody and its tour. Schnapf encouraged the group to slow down the tempo and incorporate longer verses and bridges. Cody was viewed as more accessible than previous efforts by critics; Pitchfork dismissed it as an attempt to "sound like Everclear". On Billboard's Top Album Sales chart, Cody landed at number 75, and in the top 30 on the Top Rock & Alternative Albums ranking. Cody was supported with tours alongside the Hotelier and Crying, as well as other stints with AJJ and Mannequin Pussy, plus another tour with Wavves in late 2017. Cody ended up being their only album with Enzor behind the drum kit; he was replaced on 2018's Million Dollars to Kill Me by Pat Ware, of the group Spraynard.

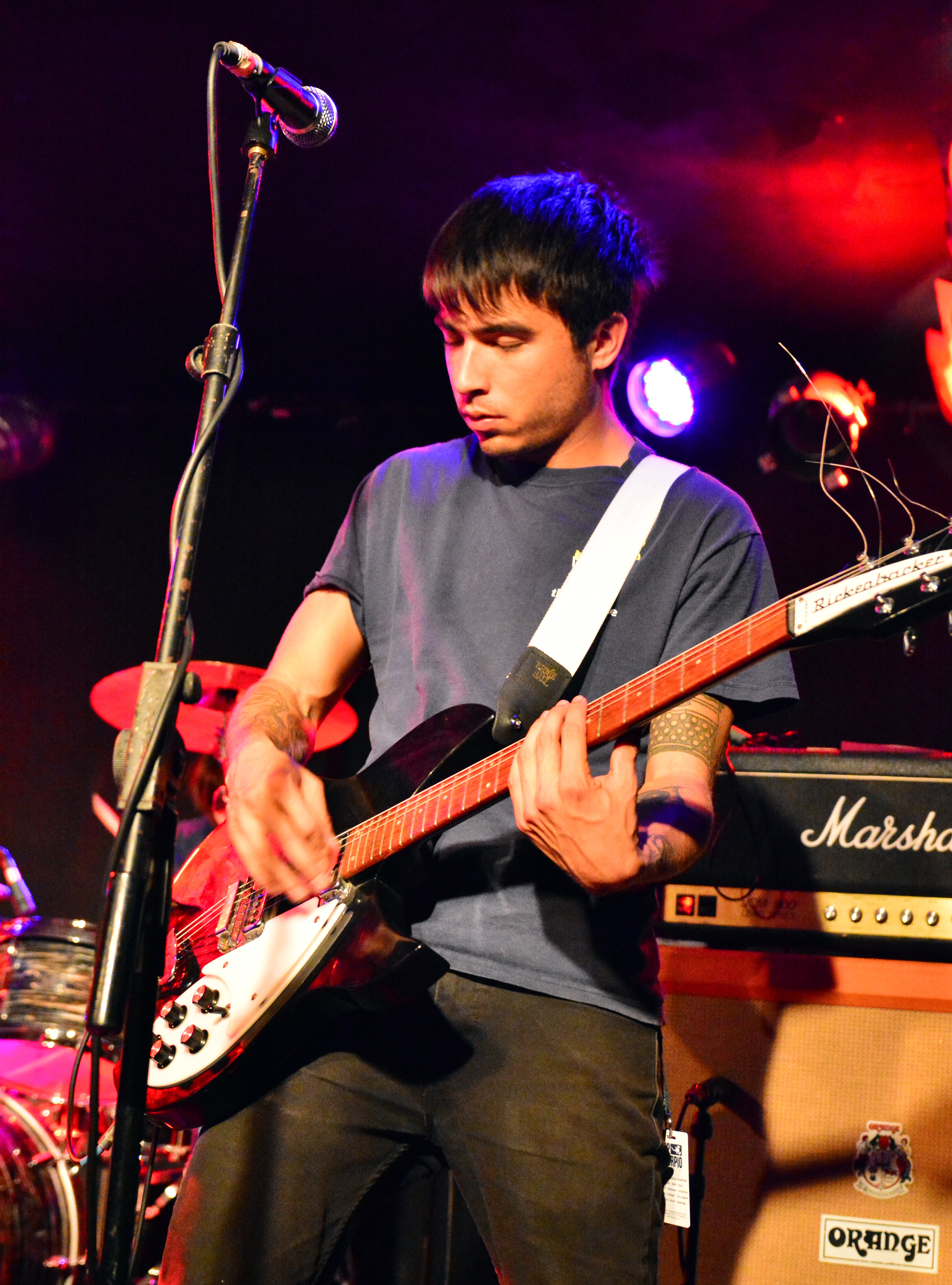
Guitarist Chase Knobbe

The band issued their next album, Million Dollars to Kill Me, in 2018. Million Dollars to Kill Me was produced by Converge's Kurt Ballou, and spawned three singles, including the title track, "Think I’m Still in Love with You" and "Big Lie". The band played larger rooms than before, including two headlining shows at the Hollywood Palladium. The band was supported by Vundabar and Big Eyes on live dates, and joined Saves the Day for a summer co-headlining jaunt in 2019.

=== COVID-19 years and afterwards (2020–2024) ===
The band had considered a hiatus before teaming with Ware; indeed, when he left the band in 2019, Johnson confided in the other members that he felt the band was due for a break. The next year, the coronavirus pandemic took hold, prompting the band to adopt a reflective view. Midway though the year, Joyce Manor issued Songs from Northern Torrance (2020), a rarities compilation collecting early demos. The next year, the band issued a ten-year anniversary edition of their debut album, remixed by original engineer Alex Estrada, undoing editorial decisions made during the recording process the band came to regret. They added Neil Berthier on keyboards for live performances that year.

The process allowed Johnson to reevaluate older, unfinished demos that helped birth the band's latest album, the Sublime-referencing 40 oz. to Fresno (2022). The seventeen-minute long effort showcases a range of songs, both new and old, and includes a cover of "Souvenir" by OMD. Singles included "Gotta Let It Go" and "Don't Try". The band reunited with Schnapf mid-pandemic to record the album. Following Ware's exit, the band resigned themselves to simply being a three-piece, and enlisted Tony Thaxton (of Motion City Soundtrack) for a guest role on 40 oz. The band supported the album with a domestic tour alongside The Story So Far and another tour with Citizen, and overseas dates with the Menzingers. In 2023, the band played several dates with PUP, and also partnered with Weezer—one of their original influences—to open several dates of their Indie Rock Road Trip tour.

=== I Used to Go to This Bar: (2025–present) ===
In October 2025, Joyce Manor announced their seventh studio album, I Used to Go to This Bar, it was released by Epitaph Records on the 30th of January, 2026. The album has been produced by Brett Gurewitz, co-founder and guitarist of Bad Religion.

On 18 August 2025, Joyce Manor released "All My Friends Are So Depressed" as the first single for their album I Used to Go to This Bar. On 7 October 2025, Joyce Manor released the single Well, Whatever It Was featuring the new song "Well, Whatever It Was" and the previously released "All My Friends Are So Depressed". On 6 January 2026, Joyce Manor released the single I Know Where Mark Chen Lives featuring "I Know Where Mark Chen Lives" along with the two previously released tracks "Well, Whatever It Was" and "All My Friends Are So Depressed". Johnson explained that Mark Chen "was a singer and songwriter for the bands Summer Vacation and Winter Break, which didn’t get quite as popular as they deserved to. I just love Mark’s songwriting and voice". In November 2026, the album received Rock Sound's Album of the Year award.

== Musical style and influences ==
The band's sound is a mix of power pop, pop-punk and emo, with Pitchfork describing the band as writers of "very short songs and spiked alt-rock melodies with day-drunk surrealism, like a SoCal Guided By Voices that exclusively drank alcopops." Cory Apar of AllMusic said Joyce Manor is stylistically a "more traditional pop punk" act. The band members themselves have cited Blink-182, the Smiths, Guided by Voices, Pissed Jeans, Rancid, Toys That Kill, Jawbreaker, Against Me!, Weezer, and Television as influences. Johnson and Knobbe first bonded over their love of Blink-182. The band has covered songs from new wave groups such as the Buggles and OMD. The band's lyrics have thematically explored "broken homes, drunken nights, [and] faltering relationships." The band is known for its particularly brief song durations, which Johnson attributes to his tendency to self-edit, removing elements until he feels the song is at its best, whatever the length.

== Members ==
Current

- Barry Johnson – lead vocals, guitar (2008–present)
- Chase Knobbe – guitar (2008–present)
- Matt Ebert – bass, backing vocals (2009–present)

Current touring musicians

- Neil Berthier – acoustic guitar, synthesizer, backing vocals (2021–present)
- Jared Shavelson - drums (2024–present)

Former

- Kurt Walcher – drums (2009–2015)
- Jeff Enzor – drums (2015–2017)
- Pat Ware – drums (2017–2019)

Former touring musicians

- Neil Hennessy – drums (2021–2024)

== Discography ==
Studio albums

- Joyce Manor (2011)
- Of All Things I Will Soon Grow Tired (2012)
- Never Hungover Again (2014)
- Cody (2016)
- Million Dollars to Kill Me (2018)
- 40 oz. to Fresno (2022)
- I Used to Go to This Bar (2026)

Compilations

- Collection (2012)
- Songs from Northern Torrance (2020)

EPs

- Demo (2009)
- Ew Gross (2009)
- Constant Headache (2009)
- Joyce Manor / Summer Vacation Split EP (2010)
- Joyce Manor / Big Kids Split EP (2012)
- Joyce Manor / Toys That Kill Split EP (2014)
- 100% / Joyce Manor Split (2017)

Singles

| Title | Year | Peak chart positions | | Album |
| Title | Year | US Alternative | US Rock/Alt Airplay | Album |
|---|---|---|---|---|
| "All My Friends Are So Depressed" | 2025 | 19 | — | I Used To Go to This Bar |
| "I Used To Go to This Bar" | 2026 | 9 | 23 | I Used To Go to This Bar |

Music videos

- "Drainage" / "If I Needed You There" (2012)
- "Catalina Fight Song" (2014)
- "The Jerk" (2014)
- "Fake I.D." (2016)
- "Last You Heard Of Me" (2016)
- "Eighteen" (2016)
- “Million Dollars to Kill Me” (2018)
- “Think I’m Still in Love with You” (2018)
- "Big Lie" (2019)
- "Constant Headache" (2021)
- "Gotta Let It Go" (2022)
- "All My Friends Are So Depressed" (2025)
- "Well, Whatever It Was" (2025)
- "I Know Where Mark Chen Lives" (2026)
- "I Used to Go to This Bar" (2026)
