= Gnarwolves discography =

- Studio albums: 2
- EPs: 4
- Live albums: 1
- Compilation albums: 1
- Singles: 1

The discography of Gnarwolves, a British rock band, consists of two studio albums, one compilation album, four extended plays, one live album, and one single.

== Studio albums ==
Title	Album details	Peak chart positions
Title	Album details	UK
Gnarwolves	Released: 15 September 2014; Label: Tangled Talk, Big Scary Monsters, Pure Noise Records; Format: CD, DL, LP	68
Outsiders	Released: 5 May 2017; Label: Tangled Talk, Big Scary Monsters, Pure Noise Records; Format: CD, DL, LP	

== Compilation albums ==
List of compilation albums

Title	Album details
Chronicles of Gnarnia	Released: 24 February 2014; Label: Pure Noise Records; Format: CD, DL

== Extended plays ==
List of extended plays

Title	Album details
Fun Club	Original release: 1 December 2011; Re-release: 16 July 2012; Label: Tangled Talk Records; Format: DL, LP
CRU	Released: 16 July 2012; Label: Tangled Talk Records, Day By Day Records; Format: CD, DL, LP
Funemployed	Released: 17 June 2013; Label: Big Scary Monsters Recording Company; Format: DL, LP
Adolescence	Released: 13 November 2015; Label: Pure Noise Records; Format: CD, DL, LP

== Live albums ==
List of live albums

Title	Album details
Live in Glasgow	Released: 25 December 2013; Label: Self-released; Format: DL

== Singles ==
List of singles, showing year released and album name

Title	Year	Album
"Smoking Kills"	2014	Gnarwolves
