= Shoes and Socks Off =

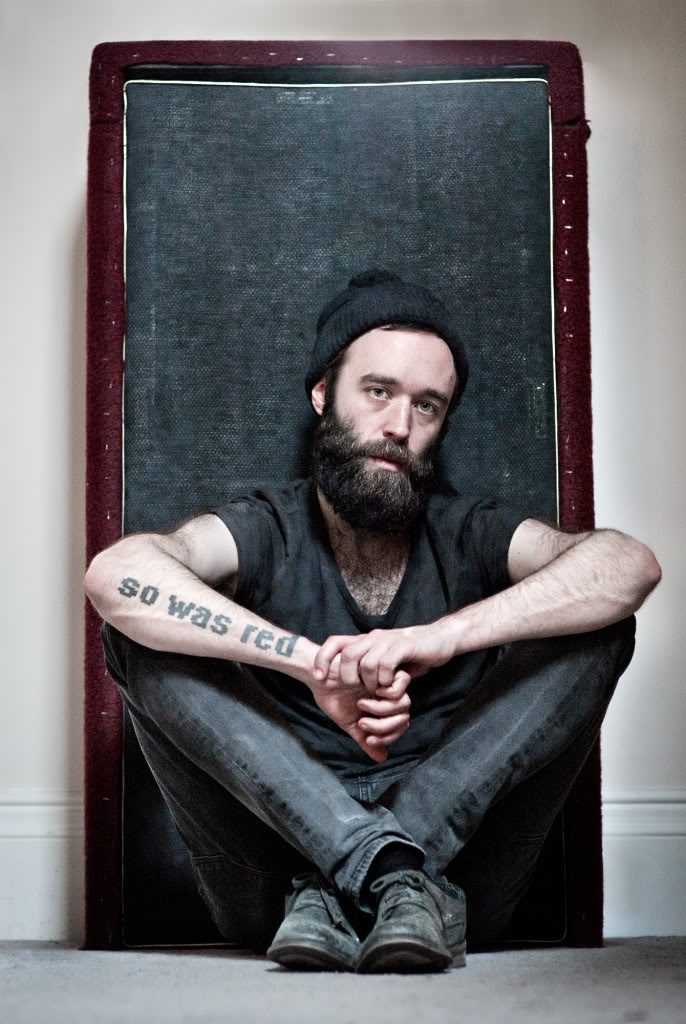
- Shoes And Socks Off (Tobias Hayes) Birmingham, 2011. Photo by Thom Hayes.

Background information
- Born: Tobias Hayes
- Origin: Brighton, England
- Genres: Anti-folk, grunge, electronic, experimental
- Years active: 2007–2012
- Label: Big Scary Monsters / Father Figure
- Website: shoesandsocksoff.co.uk

Shoes and Socks Off was a musical project by Tobias Hayes, based in Brighton, England, and active from 2007 to 2012.

== History ==
After leaving Meet Me in St. Louis in 2007, Hayes began writing songs for an acoustic solo project. It started off as a solo endeavour, mainly involving just himself and a guitar, but was sometimes performed as a group, involving drums, guitars, bass, samples, programming and strings.

His debut album From The Muddy Banks of Melitzer was recorded in September 2008 and released through DIY indie label Big Scary Monsters. It was quickly followed by Hand-Reared Suburban Piglet, featuring the same 10 songs, but re-worked with drums, strings, keys and programming.

In the winter of 2009, the third full-length album was released. To Where The Skyline Is Fortified With Windows And Doors comprised 10 new songs, some of which featured members of Nitkowski, Palehorse and Blakfish. Following quickly in summer 2010, Robin Hood Waiter Champion Have-Not, the fourth album was released. Hayes took it on tour with a band, featuring members of Nitkowski, Palehorse and Talons. A homemade video was made for every song on the record.

2011 saw the release of Don't Blame Yourself, It's in Your Blood, a three-disc anthology of all SASO recorded output to date, and 'Dot Dot Dot & Other Works', a lyric book containing words to every Shoes And Socks Off and Meet Me in St. Louis song. With the book came a download link to 10 new demos, each of which had been recorded whilst on a 40-day tour of mainland Europe with Tubelord in 2011.

In May 2012, Shoes And Socks Off's fifth album Miles of Mad Water was released on BSM in the UK and Father Figure Records in mainland Europe. Toby toured the remainder of the year, this time with a band. Oliver Newton (Yndi Halda) on drums, and Alex Petersen (Elle Milano/Love Among The Mannequins) on bass, keys and guitars.

== The end ==
On 13 August 2012, Hayes announced the end of Shoes and Socks Off via his official Tumblr blog and a final tour followed, culminating in a final show at the Old Blue Last in East London. The last SASO song ever performed live was "Epic Sweet Proportions".

Almost every Shoes and Socks Off song was written about Hayes' involvement with a consistently unnamed muse he came into contact with at the start of 2006. A strange friendship was formed, but the two were never to actually meet. By summer 2012, the long and peculiar affair ended, and as a direct result, the project had to be shut down. The 'unnamed muse' is an artist, and was responsible for nearly all artwork used for Shoes and Socks Off releases. After deciding to end the project, one last record was written, an EP called As We Get Closer, The Room Gets Smaller.

== Discography ==
Release	Format	Year	Label
As We Get Closer, The Room Gets Smaller	EP	2012	Big Scary Monsters
Miles of Mad Water	LP	2012	Big Scary Monsters
Don't Blame Yourself, it's in Your Blood	LP	2011	Big Scary Monsters
Robin Hood Waiter Champion Have-Not	LP	2010	Big Scary Monsters
Piepton	EP	2010	Big Scary Monsters
To Where Skyline is Fortified with Windows and Doors	LP	2009	Big Scary Monsters
Hand-Reared Suburban Piglet	LP	2009	Big Scary Monsters
From The Muddy Banks of Melitzer	LP	2008	Big Scary Monsters

== Other projects ==
Bermuda Ern
Love Among The Mannequins
Shield Your Eyes
Meet Me in St. Louis
Body Parts
KnorX
Push To Fire
Strobe 45
Eugene Quell
Laundromat
