= Get Cape. Wear Cape. Fly / Dave House =

Get Cape. Wear Cape. Fly/Dave House

EP by Get Cape. Wear Cape. Fly/Dave House
- Released: (United Kingdom) 14 September 2006
- Genre: Nu-Folk
- Length: 15:57
- Label: Big Scary Monsters, Gravity DIP

Get Cape. Wear Cape. Fly chronology
The Chronicles of a Bohemian Teenager (2006)	Get Cape. Wear Cape. Fly/Dave House (2006)	Searching for the Hows and Whys (2008)

Dave House chronology
Kingston's Current (2004)	Get Cape. Wear Cape. Fly/Dave House (2006)	See That No One Else Escapes (2007)

Get Cape. Wear Cape. Fly/Dave House is a split EP between featuring Get Cape. Wear Cape. Fly and Dave House. Each artist contributed one of their own songs, as well as a cover of one of their counterpart's songs. It was released in a limited pressing of 500 on 10" white vinyl, and was a joint release by each artist's respective record label. This record became the first part in the Gravity DIP split 10" series.

== Track listing ==
No.	Title	Written by	Length
1.	"The Chronicles of a Bohemian Teenager: Part 1" (Get Cape. Wear Cape. Fly)	Get Cape. Wear Cape. Fly	4:06
2.	"Weeknights & Weekends" (Get Cape. Wear Cape. Fly)	Dave House	3:15
3.	"Shiver" (Dave House)	Dave House	4:13
4.	"A Song For" (Dave House)	Get Cape. Wear Cape. Fly	4:23
Total length:			15:57
