= Meet Me in St. Louis (band) =

British post-hardcore band

- Origin: Guildford, Surrey, England
- Genres: Math rock; emo; indie rock
- Years active: 2005–2008, 2016
- Labels: Big Scary Monsters; Function; Denovali
- Past members: Benny Llewelyn; Toby Hayes; Oli Knowles; Paul Phillips; Lewis Reynolds
- Website: meetmeinstlouis.co.uk

Meet Me in St. Louis were a post-hardcore band from Guildford, Surrey, formed in 2005 and disbanded in 2008.

== History ==
Meet Me in St. Louis first formed in 2005, by Paul Phillips (drums), Tobias Hayes (vocals, bass) and Benny Llewellyn (guitar). Phillips and Llewellyn had previously played together in Escanna, while Phillips and Hayes had played together in Push to Fire. They formed Meet Me in St. Louis with the intention of being a Yeah Yeah Yeahs-inspired power trio, however soon additionally hired Oli Knowles (guitar, violin), stating in a later interview the three-piece lineup "wasn’t gonna work". After a live performance at Guildford's the Star, Hayes realised he could not play bass and sing at the same time, leading the set to be instrumental. Soon, they released advertisements on MySpace in search of a bassist, leading to the recruitment of Lewis Reynolds (bass), and Hayes' role switching to vocals and guitar.

Meet Me in St. Louis released their debut EP Promise Me That We'll Never be Like Them. I Don't Want to Wind Up Like That. Relax, Baby. We're Going to Wind Up Like Us. in April 2005. They originally had issues booking live shows due to the recording's low quality, however soon they were asked to support Jairus in June in Folkestone. At the show, the two decided to tour Eastern Europe together, which took place between 5 and 15 October, alongside Secondsmile. Kevin Douch, founder of Big Scary Monsters Recording Company, joined the bands on tour, and soon signed Meet Me in St. Louis to his label.

Their second EP And With the Right Kind of Eyes You Can Almost See the High-Water Mark - the Place Where the Wave Finally Broke and Rolled Back was recorded at Hidden Track Studios in Kent and released by Function Records on 29 May 2007. To accompany it, they released its song "Why Thankyou, Suzie" as a single and music video. On 11 June, they released a split EP release with labelmates Secondsmile. The band were featured on and supported by several important British publications such as Drowned in Sound, Kerrang, Rock Sound and NME. The band released their debut and sole LP Variations on Swing on 24 September 2007 on Big Scary Monsters Records, produced by Alex Newport of Nailbomb and Fudge Tunnel.

=== Disbandment and reunion ===
On 30 October 2007 the band announced through its official website that vocalist Toby Hayes had decided to leave Meet Me in St. Louis but assured that the rest of the band would find a new vocalist and continue going on strong. At this time, they already had a tour booked with Blakfish, which they went ahead with, performing instrumentally. After the tour, they disbanded. In January 2008 the band said they were planning a break after 3 years continual touring. But on 6 February 2008, the band confirmed that they were no more. This comes after claims made by the band at their final show at the Queen Charlotte, Norwich the previous night (4 February 2008)

Toby formed Shoes and Socks Off who released several albums with Big Scary Monsters, and was a founding member of Shield Your Eyes and Love Among The Mannequins. He now writes using the moniker Eugene Quell. Bassist Lewis Reynolds went on to play in the Kingston math-pop band Colour (who played their final show on 18 September 2009), whilst Toby Hayes began a solo project called Shoes and Socks Off (and played his final show on 24 September 2012). In early 2009 Oliver Knowles filled in for Daniel Neal, violinist of Yndi Halda on their American tour and featured on the Secondsmile album "Years". It was announced as of 11 September 2009 that Reynolds and Knowles would join Paul Philips to play alongside former Bullet Union singer and guitar player Jodie Cox in their new band Tropics. Tropics changed their name to Exes in mid-2014 and released their debut album 'Phantasmaboring' on 28 July 2014.

Big Scary Monsters invented "Meet Me in St Louis Day" – an unofficial holiday, which first took place on Wednesday 24 September 2008.

In January 2016, the five-piece lineup of Meet Me in St. Louis reunited for three shows in Leeds and two in London in June. Further shows in Kingston upon Thames, Guildford and at ArcTanGent festival were announced, with the latter proving to be the final show of their reunion phase.

== Musical style and legacy ==
Critics categorised the band's music as math rock. A 2005 article by Punktastic categorised them as indie rock, but specified that were they to begin a few years prior they would instead be called emo. Their music made use of time signature changes, dynamics, stopping and starting rhythms

They cited influenced including the Dillinger Escape Plan, Converge, Botch, Daughters, the Blood Brothers, Owls, American Football, Minus the Bear, Rumah Sakit, Hella, Interpol, Joy Division and Phantomsmasher.

Meet Me in St. Louis helped to establish a flourishing era of math rock in the United Kingdom, that also included TTNG, Tubelord and Get Cape. Wear Cape. Fly. A 2009 article by Drowned in Sound noted the band's influence upon groups including Bats and Adebisi Shank.

They have been cited as an influence by Blakfish, Johnny Foreigner, Tubelord, Rolo Tomassi, Mutiny on the Bounty, Pulled Apart by Horses, Ikr and Arcane Roots.

== Discography ==
Date of Release	Title	Label
2005	Promise me that we'll never be like them. I don't want to wind up like that. Relax, baby. We're going to end up like us.	Self-released
2006	And with the Right Kind of Eyes You Can Almost See the High Water Mark That Place Where the Wave Finally Broke and Rolled Back	Function Records
24 September 2007	Variations on Swing	BSM Records / Denovali Records

== Videography ==
- Why Thank You, Suzie (2006)
- All We Need Is a Little Energon, and a Lot of Luck (2007)

== Members ==
- Benny Llewellyn – guitar (2005–2008, 2016)
- Toby Hayes – vocals, guitar (2005–2008, 2016), bass (2005)
- Paul Phillips – drums (2005–2008, 2016)
- Oli Knowles – guitar, violin (2005–2008, 2016)
- Lewis Reynolds – bass (2005–2008, 2016)
