= Get Cape. Wear Cape. Fly (EP) =

Extended play by Get Cape. Wear Cape. Fly

EP by Get Cape. Wear Cape. Fly
- Released: 2005
- Genre: 'Nu-Folk'
- Length: 20:34
- Label: Big Scary Monsters

Get Cape. Wear Cape. Fly chronology
Get Cape. Wear Cape. Fly/The Remarkable Rocket (2004)	Get Cape. Wear Cape. Fly (2005)	Get Cape. Wear Cape. Fly/Dave House (2006)

Professional ratings
Review scores
Source	Rating
Punktastic	4/5 stars

Get Cape. Wear Cape. Fly is the debut EP of Sam Duckworth, who performs under the name Get Cape. Wear Cape. Fly. It was released in tandem with a video for "Whitewash is Brainwash", which sees Get Cape. Wear Cape. Fly travelling around on the London Underground and performing a secret show in Bank Tube Station.

== Track listing ==
1. Whitewash is Brainwash
2. Glasshouses
3. I-Spy
4. Get Cape. Wear Cape. Fly
5. A Song For
