= Arcane Roots =

English rock band

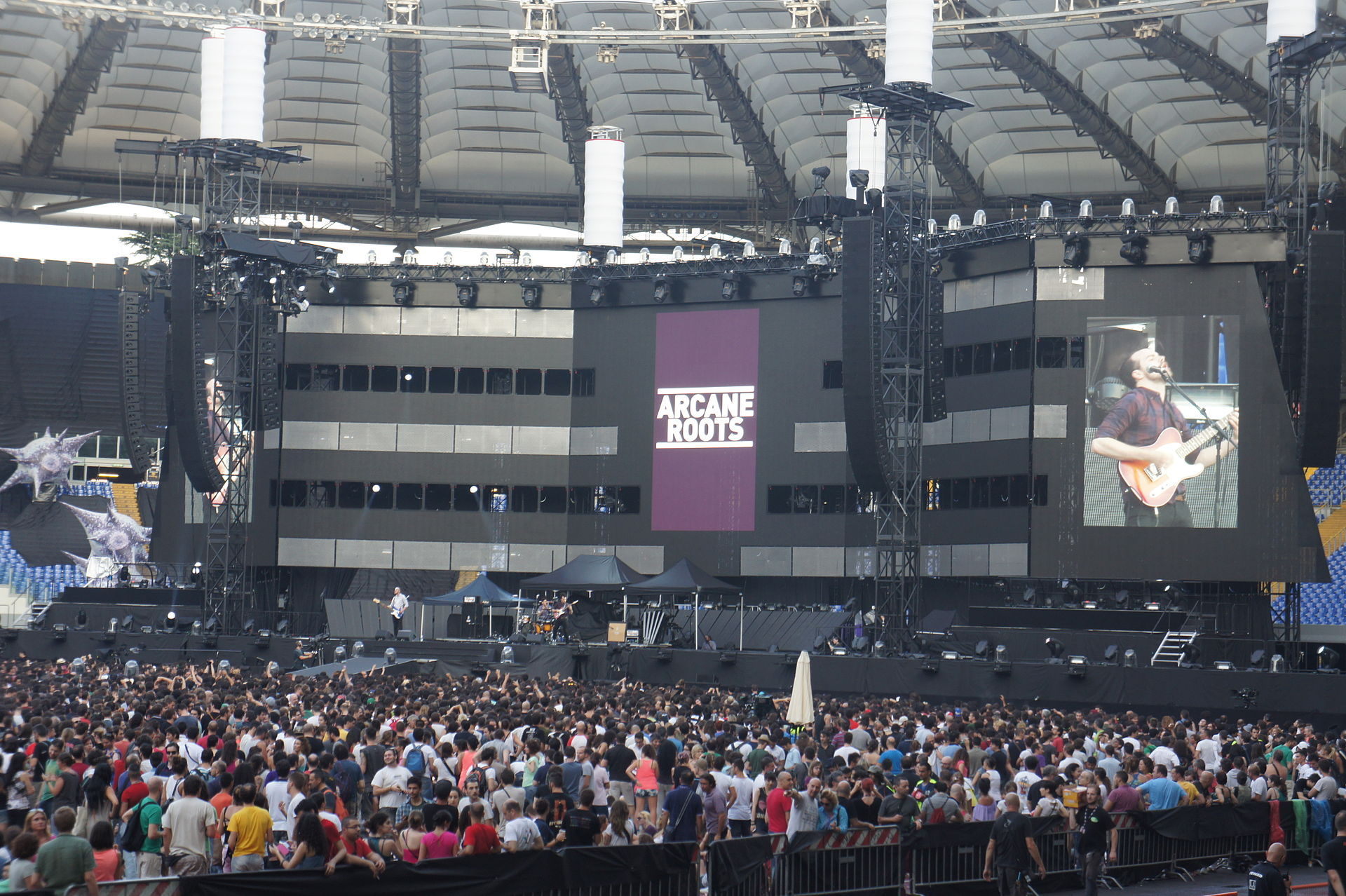
- Arcane Roots performing in 2013

Background information
- Origin: Kingston upon Thames, England
- Genres: Alternative rock; post-hardcore; progressive rock; metalcore; math rock
- Years active: 2006–2018; 2025–present
- Labels: Easy Life Records; Play It Again Sam
- Members: Andrew Groves; Adam Burton; Jack Wrench; Daryl Atkins; Bjarni Biering
- Past members: Frank Tiramani
- Website: arcaneroots.net

Arcane Roots are a five-piece alternative rock band from Kingston upon Thames, England, formed in 2006. After self-releasing several EPs, the band issued its debut full-length album, Blood & Chemistry, in 2013. This was followed by the Heaven & Earth EP in 2015, and their second studio album, Melancholia Hymns, in 2017. In 2018, they announced their intention to disband after touring for their final EP, Landslide, which was released in September of that year. In 2025, the band reformed, and in 2026, they issued their first new single, "A Wave, Across the Sea".

== History ==
=== Early years (2005–2010) ===
Andrew Groves and Daryl Atkins met at Reigate College in Surrey, while studying music technology. The pair were in numerous function/studio bands together until realising their similar opinions and approaches to music, which led to them forming the band in 2006 with bassist Frank Tiramani. Groves, though satisfied with being guitarist and songwriter, took up the dual role of guitarist and singer as they struggled to find a vocalist.

The band recorded a home studio demo of five songs and began to gig around southeast London, giving the CDs away for free. This culminated in a support slot with the French Canadian band Malajube at the 100 Club in London in September 2007.

In late 2007, Arcane Roots demoed three new songs—"Casualties", "An Easy Smile", and "Humanism Is a Condition"—plus reworkings of "What Becomes You" and "Becoming of Age" from their original home demo, to be included on a new EP entitled Brave the Sea. The album was produced and recorded by Chris Coulter, who was then working at Stakeout Studios in Richmond.

Work on the band's next, self-titled EP started sooner than expected, when the final Brave the Sea recording sessions finished early. In the coming months, three new songs were recorded: "Long & Low", "Nylon", and "Rouen". Financial problems caused the sessions to be cut short, and only the latter two songs were completed and mixed. "An Easy Smile" was also taken from Brave the Sea and added to the EP. The record was given away at shows and was available to download from the band's Myspace page. It received positive reviews from small press and secured the band management. Following the release, Adam Burton replaced Tiramani as bassist.

=== Blood & Chemistry and Heaven & Earth (2011–2014) ===
In the spring of 2009, Arcane Roots began working on a mini-album with Brave the Sea producer Chris Coulter. This was self-released digitally in April 2010 as Left Fire. The EP was subsequently re-released numerous times, first through Bandcamp in February 2011, then in remastered physical form via PIAS Recordings in 2012. The remastered version included two additional acoustic tracks (reworkings of "You Are" and "Rouen", both featuring Emily Denton), as well as an extended version of "Habibty". The album received mainly positive reviews from both press and online review sites. Left Fire's singles included "In This Town of Such Weather" and "You Are", the latter including the new, extended "Habibty" as its B-side.

In September 2011, Arcane Roots provided a cover of Nirvana's "Smells Like Teen Spirit" for Kerrang! magazine's Nevermind Forever CD. They were the only unsigned band to be included.

Arcane Roots released their debut full-length album, Blood & Chemistry, on 6 May 2013, with Clash Music streaming the record prior to its release. This was supported by a United Kingdom headline tour with The JCQ, which started on 30 April 2013, as well as a number of appearances on the festival circuit. During June 2013, the band supported English rock group Muse on the European leg of The 2nd Law World Tour, playing dates in Italy and Switzerland—this included a gig at Stadio Olimpico. The band also gained support slots on various dates of Biffy Clyro's European tour in December 2013. The two tours with Muse and Biffy Clyro had been a big aspiration of the band; however, after playing them, they realised that the large venues didn't fit their ambitions and that they felt more comfortable on smaller, more intimate tours.

A music video for the single "Resolve" was released on 31 October 2013. It was filmed in Ayr and directed by the band's drummer, Daryl Atkins.

2014 saw the band head out on tour again in Europe and the UK, before playing a few more one-off support slots and festival appearances in the summer. They made their debut at Download Festival and supported the Used at an intimate London show.

On 29 June 2015, Arcane Roots announced that Atkins would no longer be touring with them. For the rest of their live shows in 2015, he was replaced by Jack Wrench from Brighton-based band In Dynamics. That year, the band signed to Easy Life Records, a subsidiary label of Sony Music.

In July 2015, they returned to Stakeout Studios, where they had recorded Left Fire, to record music for a new extended play entitled Heaven & Earth. They had created 250 songs for the recording stage, selecting only five for inclusion on the record. Heaven & Earth was released on 16 October 2015 through Easy Life Records.

In October 2015, Arcane Roots was the main support for Fightstar in the UK. They later supported Don Broco across the UK alongside Coasts and Symmetry in December.

=== Melancholia Hymns, Landslide and breakup (2016–2018) ===
On 27 February 2016, Arcane Roots supported Enter Shikari on one date of their 2016 Mindsweeper tour at the Alexandra Palace in London. The band had decreased their tour schedule significantly in 2016 for the writing of their second album. Groves stated during the writing that the new album would be "even more left field" than their previous work. During the recording, Wrench was confirmed as Arcane Roots' official new drummer, replacing Atkins.

The band released three music videos prior to the album's release: "Curtains" on 1 February 2017, "Matter" on 22 May, and "Off the Floor" on 18 July. They played their first headline show since October 2015 on 6 February 2017 in the Bush Hall, London, to 400 people, where they debuted three new songs.

They also performed at a few European festivals, including Reading and Leeds Festivals, Moscow's Dobrofest, and Switzerland's Bern Gurten festival, and supported Evanescence in London during two shows.

On 15 September 2017, Arcane Roots' second studio album, Melancholia Hymns, was released through Easy Life Recordings. It was a significant stylistic departure, relying heavily on electronic sounds. While the band remained confident in the songs they had written, they were uncertain of the potential response to the new music, with Groves describing his fear that it would be perceived as "Arcane Roots Find a Synthesiser" or "Rock Band Finds Drum Machine". Nevertheless, the album was well received critically, being included on The Independent's rock and metal year-end list. In support of the album, the band toured across the UK and Europe, the first dates taking place in September with Good Tiger and Gold Key. Complications arose when members of the band fell ill, leading to the London and Wolverhampton dates being rescheduled to the end of the tour. Additionally, Good Tiger could no longer perform and after eight dates were replaced by Fizzy Blood.

On 31 October 2017, Arcane Roots played alongside Architects, Enter Shikari, Marmozets, Neck Deep, and PVRIS at Radio 1 Rocks, a one-off gig recorded by BBC Radio 1 at Maida Vale Studios in London. They played a cover of the Muse song "New Born" as part of their setlist.

In early 2018, they went on a series of short tours, with support from The Hyena Kill and Grumble Bee in the UK, and Jamie Lenman on the dates in Germany and the Netherlands. This was followed in June by the release of a single entitled "Landslide", alongside the announcement of an EP of the same name.

In August 2018, it was announced on the band's Facebook page that they would be splitting up after the conclusion of the Landslide tour dates "to look inwards and take on new long-term projects".

=== Renewed activity (2025) ===
In late 2025, Arcane Roots reactivated their official channels, including their website, which introduced a new mailing list, titled "ARoS Terminal", described as a way to share future announcements and updates. In November, the band launched a Discord server and hinted at forthcoming news. They later announced the upcoming single "A Wave, Across the Sea", due to be released on 27 January 2026.

== Musical style and influences ==
Arcane Roots has been described as a diverse band with a sound that ranges through different genres. The band's sound has been defined as alternative rock, math rock, post-hardcore, progressive rock, indie rock, and progressive metal.

Features of their sound include jagged guitar riffs coupled with sombre passages, possessing an "angular heaviness [that] keeps them outside of the mainstream". Their use of complex rhythmic structures and irregular beats has been credited to their math rock influence. Covering the band's sound on their earlier extended plays, their sound was noted as fusing progressive metal with "big, bombastic pop hooks". Rock Sound described their sound as fusing "At the Drive-In's skewed punk assault, a dash of Tubelord's high-pitched pop sensibility, a sprinkling of Glassjaw and some 10-fingered riffing that wouldn't be out of place on a Meet Me In St. Louis album".

When their debut album, Blood & Chemistry, was released, critics were quick to compare their sound to that of Biffy Clyro. Reviewers noted the songs' complicated influences, such as mathcore, saying, "metal guitar ability drives songs that most commonly blend soaring and melodic yearningly-worded indie pop verses with furious asymmetrical breakdowns".

The musical style of their second album, Melancholia Hymns, is seen as distinct from their previous work, as it shifts away from their post-hardcore influences. Eleanor Goodman, writing for Prog Magazine, described it as an "electronically tinged, melodic rock record that shuns the shouty bombast of their debut, 2013's Blood & Chemistry, as well as their four EPs". While writing songs for this album, the band changed their own writing conventions to create a new sound. Groves learned piano for this record and combined influences from various electronica, jazz, and classical pianists such as James Blake, Aphex Twin, Keith Jarrett, Nola Frahm, Bill Lawrence, and Bill Evans. Electronica was attractive to Groves because of its use of "unconventional rhythms and accents".

The lyrics of the non-album single "Over and Over" were written by Groves about getting married, from a hypothetical perspective. This helped Groves develop a more transparent approach to writing lyrics. Melancholia Hymns became a shift away from their personal experiences towards relatable themes and topics; "Indigo" comments on the life and death of British neurologist Oliver Sacks, while "Off the Floor" has political themes and talks about the importance of voting.

Arcane Roots were known for their energetic live shows. Groves has garnered particular attention from live reviewers for his tight multitasking of singing vocally demanding songs and complicated guitar playing.

== Band members ==
Current

- Andrew Groves – guitar, vocals (2006–2018, 2025-present), keyboards (2016–2018, 2025-present)
- Adam Burton – bass (2008–2018, 2025-present)
- Jack Wrench – drums (2016–2018, 2025-present)
- Daryl Atkins – various instruments (2006–2015, 2025-present)
- Bjarni Biering – various instruments (2025-present)

Past

- Frank Tiramani – bass (2006–2008)

== Discography ==
Arcane Roots discography
- Studio albums: 2
- Extended plays: 5
- Singles: 14
- Music videos: 8

=== Studio albums ===
Year	Album details	Peak chart positions	
Year	Album details	UK	UK Rock
2013	Blood & Chemistry: Released: 6 May 2013; Label: Play It Again Sam; Formats: CD, download	—	7
2017	Melancholia Hymns: Released: 15 September 2017; Label: Easy Life; Formats: CD, download	56	6
"—" denotes a title that did not chart.

=== EPs ===
Year	Album details
2008	Brave the Sea: Released: 2008; Label: Self-released
2009	Arcane Roots: Released: 2009; Label: Self-released
2011	Left Fire: Released: 21 February 2011; Label: Play it Again Sam (PIAS)
2015	Heaven & Earth: Released: 16 October 2015; Label: Easy Life Records
2018	Landslide: Released: 14 September 2018; Label: Easy Life Records

=== Singles ===
Year	Title	Album
2011	"You Are"	Left Fire
2012	"In This Town of Such Weather"	Left Fire
2013	"Slow"	Blood & Chemistry
2013	"Belief"	Blood & Chemistry
2013	"Resolve"	Blood & Chemistry
2014	"Over & Over"	Non-album single
2015	"If Nothing Breaks, Nothing Moves"	Heaven & Earth
2015	"Slow Dance"	Heaven & Earth
2016	"Curtains"	Melancholia Hymns
2017	"Matter"	Melancholia Hymns
2017	"Off the Floor"	Melancholia Hymns
2017	"Everything (All at Once)"	Melancholia Hymns
2017	"Indigo"	Melancholia Hymns
2018	"Landslide"	Landslide
2018	"Matter (Revel)"	Landslide
2026	"A Wave, Across the Sea"	Non-album single
