= Jeniferever / The Next Autumn Soundtrack =

The Next Autumn Soundtrack & Jeniferever

EP by The Next Autumn Soundtrack and Jeniferever
- Released: December 1, 2003
- Genre: Post-rock
- Label: BSM Records

Professional ratings
Review scores
Source	Rating
Drowned In Sound	6/10 stars

The Next Autumn Soundtrack & Jeniferever was a split EP recorded by post-rock bands Jeniferever and The Next Autumn Soundtrack, released on December 1, 2003. It was released on the independent record label Big Scary Monsters. The opening two tracks are by Jeniferever, with the closing three by The Next Autumn Soundtrack.

== Track listing ==
1. "Kap Farvel" (Jeniferever)
2. "The Day the Violence Died" (Jeniferever)
3. "Nightnightbyebye" (The Next Autumn Soundtrack)
4. "Our Sleep is Like a Tape: When it Runs Out We Just Turn Over" (The Next Autumn Soundtrack)
5. "What is it About the Winter That Makes You Feel Lonely?" (The Next Autumn Soundtrack)
