= Ocean Bottom Nightmare =

- Origin: Nottingham, England
- Genres: Alternative rock Punk rock
- Years active: 2007–present
- Label: Phat Phidelity
- Members: Jonny Hall; Tom Wintle; James "Judas" Housley
- Website: oceanbottomnightmare.com

Ocean Bottom Nightmare (also known as OBN) is an alternative rock group based in Nottingham, England. The band named themselves after the fictional Ocean Bottom Nightmare Band, from the Adult Swim cartoon Sealab 2021 (which itself was a parody of the song "The River Bottom Nightmare Band" played by The Nightmare in Emmet Otter's Jug-Band Christmas television special).

== Career ==
The band formed in 2007, and quickly made a mark on the local Nottingham scene by coming joint third in the University of Nottingham's BandSoc 2007 Battle of the Bands competition. Following this promising success, the band began gigging around the UK, sharing stages with Future of the Left, Baddies, The Eighties Matchbox B-Line Disaster, Pulled Apart By Horses, Gay For Johnny Depp, Tubelord and Blakfish.

Throughout 2008, the band sporadically recorded at Random Recordings in Nottingham with Guy Elderfield, and created their debut EP We Are Serious, which was released in 2009. The 4-track EP was well received by the music press; Sean Stanley writing for Sandman magazine wrote: "Faultless… Possibly what an apocalypse should sound like".

The band released their first single, "What Would Judas Do?" on 10 May 2010. The single was mixed by Chris Sheldon (Biffy Clyro, Foo Fighters, Reuben) and again it was well received, and the week following its release they were BBC Introducing's Tip of the Week. To promote the release they launched a website, which allowed fans to ask questions to drummer James "Judas" Housley, about what he would do in a particular situation. The responses are filmed by the band and uploaded to the site.

== Band members ==
=== Current ===
- Jonny Hall – vocals, guitar (2007–present)
- Tom Wintle – vocals, bass, lyrics (2007–present)
- James "Judas" Housley – vocals, drums, glockenspiel, stylophone (2007–present)

=== Former ===
- Ed Gorrod – stylophone, drums (live only) (2009)

== Discography ==
Date of release	Title	Label
2009	We Are Serious (EP)	Phat Phidelity
May 2010	"What Would Judas Do?" (single)	Phat Phidelity
