= Matter (disambiguation) =

Matter is the substance of which objects are made.

Matter or Matters may also refer to:

- Matter (philosophy), a concept in philosophy

== Entertainment and media ==
- Matters (album), a 2004 album by Pulley
- Matter (novel), a 2008 novel by Iain M. Banks
- Matter, a 2012 Marathi-language Indian film directed by Satish Motling
- Matter (online magazine), an online science publication
- Matter (music magazine), a Chicago music magazine
- Matter (journal), an online science publication
- Matters (band)
- Matter (venue), a London music venue and nightclub
- Matter (album), a 2016 album by synthpop artist St Lucia
- Matter (video game), a cancelled video game for the Xbox 360
- "Matter", a song by Arcane Roots from Melancholia Hymns

== Folklore ==
- Matter of Britain
- Matter of France
- Matter of Rome

== Other ==
- Matter (standard), a home automation connectivity standard
- Matter Valley, a Swiss valley containing Zermatt

== See also ==
- Brain matter (disambiguation)
- Dark matter
- Mattar
