= Tezcatlipoca (disambiguation) =

Tezcatlipoca was an Aztec deity.

Tezcatlipoca may also refer to:

- Tezcatlipoca (DC Comics), a fictional character from the DC Comics universe
- Tezcatlipoca (Los Comex), a character from the independent comic, El Muerto: The Aztec Zombie
- Tezcatlipōca (EP), an EP by Tubelord
- 1980 Tezcatlipoca, an asteroid, in space near Earth
