= OBN =

OBN may refer to:

- OBN, IATA code for Oban Airport in Scotland
- Ocean Bottom Nightmare, a rock band from Nottingham, England
- Oceania Broadcasting Network, a free-to-air television network in Tonga
- Oklahoma Bureau of Narcotics and Dangerous Drugs Control, a state law enforcement agency in Oklahoma, US
- Omni Broadcasting Network (2003–2013), former US regional television network
- "Order Of The Brown Nose", a mock honour awarded by British satirical magazine Private Eye for published examples of sycophancy
- Oromia Broadcasting Network, a regional broadcaster in Ethiopia
- OBN Televizija, a terrestrial television network in Bosnia-Herzegovina
- Old Boys Network (OBN)
