= JCQ =

JCQ may refer to:

- The JCQ, a British rock band
- John Callahan's Quads!
- Joint Council for Qualifications
