= Blakfish =

English mathcore band

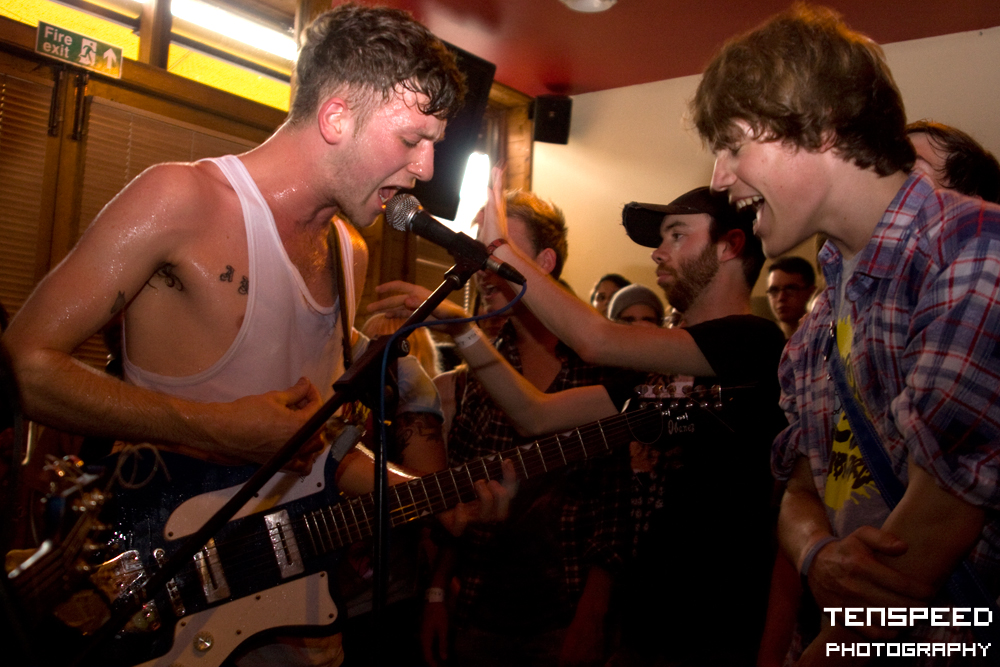
- Blakfish in 2009

Background information
- Origin: Birmingham, England
- Genres: Mathcore, math rock
- Years active: 2000–2010
- Labels: Big Scary Monsters, Hassle, Zankyo, Richter
- Past members: Thom Peckett; Sam Manville; Richard Lee; Robert 'Wiz' Wisely

Blakfish was a mathcore band. The band from Birmingham, England formed in the year 2000 after meeting and becoming friends at school, contrary to their frequent fabricated claims that they all met in juvenile prison.

The band was perhaps best known for its live shows and relentless touring schedule, which led to it being labeled by many as one of the hardest-working bands in the country. In 2007 Blakfish became the full-time job of the members, and in 2008 they went on to play over 200 shows in over 10 countries topping that in 2009 with another 200 shows in 16 countries. They played shows with, amongst others, Hell Is For Heroes (on their farewell tour) and Tubelord. In 2010 they achieved a support slot on the Biffy Clyro European tour, which ultimately led to the demise of the band, which they announced on their Myspace blog. The band split up mid-tour following the departure of guitarist and vocalist Sam Manville. They had been scheduled to play shows in Tokyo and Osaka later in the year with 65daysofstatic. Plans were also shelved to record their second album, again in Seattle with Chris Common. Seven instrumental demos were recorded in Lewes with producer Nick Kinnish, never to be released.

== History ==
=== Early years, Dirty Import and myforteistimetravel (2000–2005) ===
Blakfish formed when the members were 14 years old, originally playing nu metal, citing their inspirations as Green Day and Limp Bizkit. The founders met through their secondary school and recorded a series of demos, none of which were released. They cycled through a number of members before solidying as Sam Manville (guitar, vocals), Thomas Peckett (guitar, vocals), Richard Lee (bass) and Robert Wisely (drums). They performed frequently at 14+ nights held at Birmingham venue Eddies Rock Club and performing alongside ska punk bands such as Spunge and Farse.

By the time the members were 16, they had begun to make music influenced by the Blood Brothers. Through attending North Warwickshire and South Leicestershire College, they gravitated towards bands with similar styles such as This Tragic Vision, who later became Mirror Mirror then Youths. Blakfish recorded their first EP, Dirty Import, in 2004, and followed this up a year later with the four-track myforteistimetravel.

=== Gold, See You in Another City, Champions and disbandment (2005–2010) ===
When the members were 20, the Birmingham ska scene had declined and they began emailing bands around the country to perform with. They most frequently found themselves performing alongside Meet Me in St. Louis in Leeds. Their first tour was supporting Meet Me in St. Louis. In 2007 they recorded a gapless three-track EP named Gold. After this they signed to Big Scary Monsters, and in 2008 their fourth EP, See You in Another City, was released, to a largely positive reception. See You in Another City was produced by Jason Wilson at Stakeout Studios. The track "Jeremy Kyle Is A Marked Man" featured on the computer game Colin McRae: Dirt 2, and the polish movie Suicide Room as well as receiving airplay from 4 different presenters on BBC Radio 1.

2009 saw the release of their one and only album, Champions, recorded by Chris Common at the Redroom Studios Seattle. The band were stopped at an airport along the way and were questioned about the content of their lyrics book, which contained the dark lyrics to "9th Base". This experience was visited in the album track "Randy Sage – True American Hero" (Randy Sage was an airline pilot they met at the airport). The album for the most part was widely praised; Kerrang! rated the album 4/5, and Rock Sound gave it a 9/10, whilst NME was amongst the minority that did not enjoy the album, giving it a 1/10 rating, despite naming the band as "ones to watch" in 2009. The album was later re-released in a limited edition known as French Champions. Each unit was handmade and used real gold leaf for the cover art. They also recorded a Christmas single for Christmas 2009 once again with Nick Kinnish, named "Missing You (The True Meaning of Christmas)", in which Rich and Wiz both sang as well as Thom and Sam. The single was released for free download on their website, along with an accompanying video.

In February 2010, Blakfish were touring Europe with Biffy Clyro, playing shows in Germany, Switzerland and Spain. In Bilbao, Sam announced he felt he could no longer continue as a member of Blakfish, and left the band with immediate effect. The remaining three members decided they would continue as a band – but this band would not be Blakfish. The band pulled out of the remaining shows in Bilbao and Barcelona, and canceled a UK-wide tour scheduled for March, as well as shows in Japan with 65daysofstatic later in the year.

=== Post-Blakfish (2010–2022) ===
A 'Blakfish and Friends' farewell show took place on 19 March 2010 at The Flapper in Birmingham, with friends of the band filling in for Sam's vocals and guitars. Guest performers included Toby Hayes of Shoes And Socks Off and Meet Me in St. Louis, Steven Bachelor and Richard Buckley of Shapes, and members of Soni~Quella and The James Cleaver Quintet Jack Saunders (vox) Jimmy Diego (bass) Maud E Licious (guitar) Mackerel Skarrington (drums). Tickets for the event sold out on the first night they went on sale. Support came from Shapes, The James Cleaver Quintet and Conquistadors. Fifty screen prints of the poster for the show were made available, as was a re-issue of See You in Another City containing nine additional tracks of b-sides and rarities. At the final show, Thom, Rich and Wiz debuted a track named "You're A Guy", the first public performance of their new material for a new three-piece band.

After the band broke up, Thom, Rich and Wiz officially formed &U&I and released EP Kill the Man that Shot that Man on ondryland Records and LP Light Bearer the following year. Sam created two bands, one called "Vietwow!" with Toby Hayes (Meet Me in St. Louis, Shield Your Eyes, Shoes And Socks Off), Alex Wiezak (Youves) and Bob D'Mello (Super Tennis) and a two-piece named "†Hymns†" with former SOS drummer Peter Reisner. †Hymns† released their debut double album Cardinal Sins/Contrary Virtues in January 2012 on Big Scary Monsters. He also continues to work on his solo project "Greatest Hits".

In 2010, Rob played drums on a project with On the Might of Princes guitarist and singer, Jason Rosenthal. Following Rosenthal's death in August 2013, plans were made to finish and release the material.

Sam Manville reinvented himself as an electronic, house and garage producer under the pseudonym FTSE and has worked with MØ, Shola Ama, Burnaboy and Peking Duk releasing on labels including Ministry of Sound and Rinse. In 2017 he started his own record label, Roller Blaster Records.

In 2019 Manville released an acoustic solo album of covers entitled Somebody Else's Songs under the moniker S.T. Manville.

== Musical style and legacy ==
Critics categorised Blakfish's music as mathcore and math rock. In a 2021 interview, the members stated of their music that "the Blackfish stuff it was more just about trying to fuck with people yeah I mean there was the point like it wasn't really there wasn't any like I just write like this I'm just weird it was just like right okay what, what is, what's going to be the weirdest thing that you can, not weirdest, but like, how can you fucking, how can you give people not what they're expecting to hear right now?"

They cited influence including Meet Me in St. Louis, Adebisi Shank, Dillinger Escape Plan, Daughters, the Plot to Blow Up the Eiffel Tower, the Blood Brothers, Brainiac, Life Without Buildings, the JCQ, Bear vs. Shark and Coheed and Cambria.

Blakfish helped to establish a flourishing era of math rock in the United Kingdom, that also included TTNG, Tubelord and Get Cape. Wear Cape. Fly. Visions.de writer Jens Mayer credite them as having "skillfully fused the mathcore and indie rock worlds". On 24 August 2012, marking three years to the day since the release of Champions, Leeds-based magazine Musical Mathematics celebrated the first ever Blakfish Day, encouraging fans to celebrate the band's music and career. This was also the first and last time that Blakfish's second album demos were heard, via Musical Mathematics' website.

They have been cited as an influence by Pulled Apart by Horses, Marmozets, Classically Handsome Brutes, Johnny Foreigner, A Lot Like Birds, Mutiny on the Bounty and Maybeshewill.

== Band members ==
In interviews and media, the band generally were generally referred to by their stage names.

- Thomas Peckett ('Thomas Rock') – Guitar, vocals
- Sam Manville ('Sammy Vile') – Guitar, vocals
- Richard Lee ('Richard Hollywood') – Bass
- Robert 'Wiz' Wisely ('Robert Fruit') – Drums

== Lyrical themes ==
The lyrics to Blakfish songs were generally about things which annoyed them. Some examples include:-

- At shows they said that "Economics" was "about money, cos we've got none"
- "Ringo Starr – 2nd Best Drummer in the Beatles" is about their disdain for the music industry and nightclubs
- "Your Hair's Straight But Your Boyfriend Ain't" is about fashion – Sam Manville said "clothes are just there to keep you warm, people take it so seriously. I guess it's just another jibe at the British public."
- "I Saw A Car on Fire There Once" is about the band's hatred of driving through London
- "Randy Sage – True American Hero" is about the band's struggle with officials at an American airport when trying to enter the country to record their album
- "Preparing For Guests" is about the process of tidying the house for visitors, and how "it's like we're lying to all of our friends"
- "Scotland's Worst Invention" is about dislike for television, and includes the line "What's with all these f***ing soaps, I want Ray Mears not Hollyoaks"

This was not the only inspiration for songs though, some other song meanings include:-

- "...Rollerskates" is about a friend of the band, whose girlfriend went travelling
- "I'm Laughing Now... But It's No Joke" is about the film Into the Wild

== Discography ==
=== Albums ===
- Champions (2009)

01. Economics
02. Ringo Starr – 2nd Best Drummer in The Beatles
03. Your Hair's Straight but Your Boyfriend Ain't
04. If the Good Lord Had Intended Us to Walk He Wouldn't Have Invented Rollerskates
05. We Beg, We Borrow, We Steal
06. I Saw a Car on Fire There Once
07. The Closer to the Bone, the Sweeter the Meat
08. Randy Sage – True American Hero
09. I'm Laughing Now... But It's No Joke
10. 9th Base
11. Scotland's Worst Invention

=== EPs ===
- See You in Another City (Re-release, 2010)

01. Preparing For Guests
02. My Stomach Feels Like My Throats Been Cut
03. Jeremy Kyle Is A Marked Man
04. Make Your Bed And Lie in It
05. Carnival of Carnivores
Bonus tracks:
06. Leaving Home (Dirty import, 2002)
07. 22nd (myforteistimetravel, 2005)
08. Death of a Soap Star (myforteistimetravel, 2005)
09. Captain Burns (Gold, Live, 2007)
10. The Curriculum Vitae of Uri Gagarin (Carnival of Carnivores demo, 2008)
11. Sh*t on My Face and Tell Me I'm Simon Cowell (Ringo Starr – 2nd Best Drummer in the Beatles demo, 2008)
12. Jeremy Kyle Is A Marked Man (Game version, 2009)
13. Charmer (Kings of Leon cover – Rollerskates b-side, 2009)
14. A Day in the Life (un-used b-side, 2009)

- See You in Another City (2008)

01. Preparing For Guests
02. My Stomach Feels Like My Throats Been Cut
03. Jeremy Kyle Is A Marked Man
04. Make Your Bed And Lie in It
05. Carnival of Carnivores (listed in some places as 'Carnival Carnivore')

- Gold (2007)

01. Captain Burns
02. Merry Fucking Xmas
03. Planes, Trains And Obese Women

- myforteistimetravel (2005)

01. 22nd
02. Superpowers
03. Death of a Soapstar
04. Cooking Can Be Child's Play

- Dirty Import (2004)

01. Leaving Home
02. Senile
03. Clifton

=== Other ===
- Missing You (The True Meaning of Christmas) – Free download Christmas single (2009)
- Captain Burns – (Appears on) Various Artists Vol.11 (Sotones Records; 1 August 2007; STCD001). MP3 and CD (numbered edition of 1000). Reissued 2009 (without Captain Burns)
