= Before Me =

Before Me may refer to:

- Before Me, album by Gladys Knight 2006
- "Before Me", song by Arcane Roots from Melancholia Hymns
