= Romance (Tubelord album) =

Studio album by Tubelord
- Released: October 10, 2011
- Genre: Alternative rock Math rock Indie pop
- Length: 38:43
- Label: Pink Mist
- Producer: Tubelord

Tubelord chronology
Tezcatlipōca (2010)	Romance (2011)	Pop Songs for Rock Kids (2013)

Singles from Romance
- 1. "4t3" Released: 12 July 2011; 2. "My First Castle" Released: 14 September 2011

Professional ratings
Review scores
Source	Rating
MusicVita.com	8/10 stars
thisisfakediy.com	8/10 stars
NME	6/10 stars
Bowlegsmusic.com	2.5/10 stars
thedigitalfix.com	7/10 stars

Romance is the second and final studio album by the British alternative rock band Tubelord. It was released on the October 10, 2011 on the independent UK label Pink Mist. The album was the follow-up to their 2009 album, Our First American Friends and 2010 EP, Tezcatlipōca. It is their first full-length album with bassist Tom Coulson-Smith and synth/keys James Elliot Field. The album has been released on compact disc, digital download and vinyl.

The song "4t3", which was released on July 13, 2011, has been quoted by Fourr to be named after an occurrence with a taxi driver who they had got a lift with and started conversing about the number of people they have had sex with, which then the taxi driver responded with "43 people". Opening track "Over In Brooklyn" is a continuation from the closing track (which is the title track) of Our First American Friends.

The song "My First Castle", which was released September 14, 2011, is currently the only single of the album, and was released in cassette form via the Pink Mist bigcartel website. The cassette features "My First Castle" as well as two bonus tracks titled "Elle Barge" and "Death" on the A side, with the B side featuring six poems by three poets; Rachael Allen, Andrew Parkes and Sam Buchan-Watts from London Arts collective clinic.

== Track listing ==
All tracks are written by Xoey Fourr and Tubelord.

No.	Title	Length
1.	"Over In Brooklyn"	3:26
2.	"Never Washboard"	3:31
3.	"4t3"	3:53
4.	"Charms"	3:32
5.	"Here Is Nothing"	3:23
6.	"Go Old"	3:00
7.	"My First Castle"	3:07
8.	"Ignatz"	1:53
9.	"Waterworld"	4:16
10.	"In Greenland"	4:28
11.	"Tidy Diggs"	4:09
Total length:		38:43

== Personnel ==
- Xoey Fourr - Guitar, Lead Vocals, Keyboard, Percussion
- Tom Coulson-Smith - Bass Guitar, Percussion
- David Catmur - Drums, Backing Vocal, Percussion
- James Elliot Field - Piano, Keyboard, Percussion
