= Gnarwolves (album) =

Studio album by Gnarwolves
- Released: 15 September 2014
- Recorded: Recorded by Lewis Johns at The Ranch Production House
- Genre: Punk rock, pop punk, skate punk
- Length: 27:59
- Label: Big Scary Monsters Recording Company, Pure Noise Records

Gnarwolves chronology
Chronicles of Gnarnia (2014)	Gnarwolves (2014)	Adolescence (2015)

Singles from Gnarwolves
- 1. "Smoking Kills" Released: 15 July 2014

Gnarwolves is the eponymously-titled debut album by the British punk rock band Gnarwolves, released on 15 September 2014.

Iona Cairns of the band Great Cynics features on the song 'Eat Dynamite, Kid' as an additional vocalist. At the end of 'Eat Dynamite, Kid' there is a secret track referred to as 'the hardcore song' which features Lewis Johns on guitar.

== Reception ==
Professional ratings
Review scores
Source	Rating
7BitArcade	(Very Positive)
Punknews.org	3.5/5 stars

The album peaked at number 68 in the UK album chart in its first week of release and number 4 in the Rock album chart.

Aaron Kent of 7BitArcade called the album 'excellent' stating the debut album to be 'a lot better than most bands achieve three or four albums in'. Kent claimed 'Gnarwolves may be the most authentic, consistent new band on the punk circuit currently, and their self-titled debut album only fulfils this promise' giving the album a very positive review.

== Track listing ==
All music is composed by Gnarwolves.

No.	Title	Length
1.	"Prove It"	2:24
2.	"Boneyard"	2:49
3.	"Everything You Think You Know"	2:48
4.	"Bottle to Bottle"	2:30
5.	"Smoking Kills"	2:28
6.	"Day Man"	2:22
7.	"Hate Me (Don't Stand Still)"	3:30
8.	"Ebb"	2:05
9.	"Flow"	1:54
10.	"Eat Dynamite, Kid"	5:09
Total length:		27:59

== Personnel ==
Gnarwolves

- Thom Weeks - Vocals/Guitar
- Charlie Piper - Vocals/Bass
- Max Weeks - Drums
