= Blood & Chemistry =

Studio album by Arcane Roots
- Released: 6 May 2013
- Genre: Progressive rock, post-hardcore
- Length: 58:06
- Label: Play It Again Sam
- Producer: Dan Austin

Arcane Roots chronology
Left Fire (2010)	Blood & Chemistry (2013)	Melancholia Hymns (2017)

Professional ratings
Aggregate scores
Source	Rating
Metacritic	(71/100)
Review scores
Source	Rating
Dead Press!	8/10 stars
DIY	4/5 stars
Drowned In Sound	(6/10)

Blood & Chemistry is the debut full-length studio album by the British alternative rock band Arcane Roots, released in 2013 on Play It Again Sam.

== Background ==
On 17 April 2013, Arcane Roots released a teaser video for the album, alongside the release date and a UK headline tour in April–May 2013.

== Critical reception ==
Clash called the album "full of unabashed, unreserved rock thrills - a potent, powerful document of a band on the rise, it matches the unbridled energy of their live show to a mature control of the studio." The Guardian called it "a record of elaborate verses, heartfelt choruses and skipping time signatures worthy of late-period Biffy Clyro."

== Track listing ==
No.	Title	Length
1.	"Energy Is Never Lost, Just Redirected"	5:12
2.	"Resolve"	4:05
3.	"Belief"	5:17
4.	"Sacred Shapes"	5:03
5.	"Hell and High Water"	5:35
6.	"Triptych"	6:12
7.	"Slow"	7:29
8.	"Second Breath"	5:46
9.	"Held Like Kites"	4:41
10.	"You Keep Me Here"	8:46
Total length:		58:06

Bonus tracks
No.	Title	Length
11.	"Harboured At Sea" (iTunes)	3:56

== Personnel ==
All personnel credits adapted from Blood & Chemistry's liner notes.

Arcane Roots

- Andrew Groves - vocals, guitar
- Adam Burton - bass, vocals
- Daryl Atkins - drums, cover artwork, design

Production

- Dan Austin - production
- Chris Coulter - mixing, additional engineering and production
- Andy 'Hippie' Baldwin - mastering
