= Mikey Glenister =

Mikey Glenister (born 20 September 1984) is an English musician, radio DJ and author from Southend-on-Sea, Essex, England. He plays trumpet, cornet and drums. His biggest clients are Get Cape. Wear Cape. Fly. and Matt Linnen. Glenister is the author of humour book, So I'm on a Bus. He is currently a marketing and operations manager for Brickhouse BOSH in Southend-on-Sea.

== Musical career ==
Coming from a brass band background from an early age, Glenister went on to study at The British Academy of New Music where he studied drums and contextual studies. Shortly after this he started playing with Sam Duckworth in Get Cape. Wear Cape. Fly. Glenister has also recorded and played live with The Walkmen, Plan B and Tubelord.

Mikey was radio DJ for Ray Radio between 2019-2020, a community radio station based in Southend-on-Sea, Essex. His show 'The Only Play is Essex' promoted alternative music from the Essex music scene.

== Writing career ==
Glenister released his first book, So I'm on a Bus, on 1 December 2014, which was published by Zeshan Qureshi. It is illustrated by Lee Baker. So I'm on a Bus is a humorous collection of stories and observations from Glenister, based on real-life experiences whilst getting buses. Despite its December release, So I'm on a Bus was ranked #1 on Amazon.co.uk for hot new releases in comedy throughout November 2014.

== Television appearances ==
As well as live appearances with Get Cape. Wear Cape. Fly on shows like T4 Transmission and The Culture Show, Glenister appeared on one episode of Hollyoaks, playing as himself in Get Cape. Wear Cape. Fly. They also did a live performance on set.

Glenister was also a contestant on the reality TV show Dating In The Dark on Living TV in 2010. He appeared on the episode with his twin brother Rob Glenister. On the show, Glenister met Stephani Sams, who modelled for SuicideGirls.

On 10 September 2015, the music video for 'Demons' by James Morrison premiered. It features Glenister and his twin brother Rob alongside eight other sets of identical twins. The video follows the singer as he observes the physical embodiment of people’s inner demons. The Seven deadly sins are played out, with the twins each portraying a person being controlled by their demon influencing their actions. He and Rob appear as a graffiti artist, representing the sin 'pride'.

== Bibliography ==
- Glenister, Mikey (2014). So I'm on a Bus. Zeshan Qureshi. ISBN 978-1910399002.
