= Delta Sleep =

British rock band

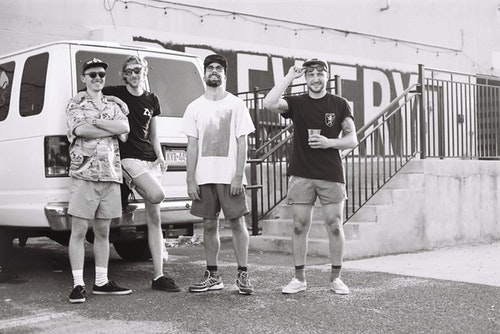
- Delta Sleep in 2018

Background information
- Origin: Brighton, England, UK
- Genres: Indie rock; math rock
- Years active: 2010–present
- Labels: Big Scary Monsters, Sofa Boy Records, Wax Bodega
- Members: Devin Yüceil; Glen Hodgson; Dave Jackson; Dave Morgan
- Past members: Adam Brodigan; Maria Sullivan; Blake Mostyn
- Website: www.deltasleepband.co.uk

Delta Sleep are a British math rock band, formed in 2010 in Canterbury. They are currently based in Brighton and consist of Devin Yüceil on guitar and vocals, Glen Hodgson on guitar, Dave Jackson on bass and Dave Morgan on drums. They have so far released 4 EPs and 5 albums.

== History ==
=== Early years, Management, and Twin Galaxies (2010–2017) ===
Delta Sleep emerged from a band called Sávlön, featuring bass player Maria Sullivan and drummer Adam Brodigan beside Yüceil and Hodgson. They released a self-titled EP in 2010, followed by Management in 2013. Shortly after the release of Management, Sullivan and Brodigan left the band to start a family and focus on other musical projects, respectively. They were replaced by Dave Jackson and Blake Mostyn respectively, both friends of the band. Delta Sleep released their first full-length album Twin Galaxies in January 2015.

=== Ghost City, Younger Years and Soft Sounds (2018–2021) ===
Their second full-length album, Ghost City, was released in August 2018 to critical acclaim. Ghost City was promoted with tours in Europe, North America and East Asia. During touring for Ghost City, Delta Sleep released their EP Younger Years as a surprise in September 2019.

Following cancelled tour dates due to the COVID-19 pandemic, Delta Sleep gradually released their compilation album Soft Sounds between May and July 2020. Soft Sounds consists of 9 stripped-down and acoustic live performances that were recorded during touring in France, Japan, the United States and Turkey as well as a new song "A Casa", which was later featured on their 2024 album Blue Garden.

=== Departure from Big Scary Monsters, Spring Island, and Blue Garden (2021–present) ===
In March 2021, Delta Sleep left Big Scary Monsters and started their own independent record label called Sofa Boy Records which is named after their song 'Sofa Boy' from The Younger Years EP. On 9 June 2021 Delta Sleep released the single 'The Detail' and announced their third album, Spring Island, which was planned for release on 10 September 2021. On 15 August 2021 Delta Sleep announced that Spring Island would be delayed until 12 November 2021, owing to delayed vinyl manufacturing caused by Brexit and COVID-19. On 7 May 2024 Delta Sleep signed with Wax Bodega in the United States. On 7 August 2024 Delta Sleep announced their fifth album Blue Garden, consisting of the singles 'Sunchaser', 'Figure in the Dark' and 'Glow' as well as including the studio recording of 'A Casa' from the Soft Sounds compilation album in the tracklist.

== Musical style ==
Both Twin Galaxies and Ghost City are concept albums that follow a protagonist overcoming hardship. Twin Galaxies follows a man whose life was uprooted by a flood on his way to find new hope. In Ghost City, a woman escapes from a dystopian, oppressive city to find a better life more in connection with nature. In contrast, Younger Years was written without an overarching concept in mind.

Delta Sleep's musical style has been described as math rock and indie rock. Many songs feature odd time signatures and are structured unconventionally.

== Discography ==
=== Albums ===
- Twin Galaxies (Big Scary Monsters, 2015)
- Ghost City (Big Scary Monsters, 2018)
- Soft Sounds (Big Scary Monsters, 2020)
- Spring Island (Sofa Boy, 2021)
- Blue Garden (Sofa Boy and Wax Bodega, 2024)

=== EPs ===
- Delta Sleep (self-released, 2010)
- Management (Big Scary Monsters, 2013)
- Ghost City Rarities (Big Scary Monsters, 2019)
- Younger Years (Big Scary Monsters, 2019)

=== Singles ===
- Camp Adventure (Full Band Single + Remix) (Big Scary Monsters, 2015)
- The Detail (Sofa Boy, 2021)
- View to a Fill (Sofa Boy, 2021)
- Forest Fire (Sofa Boy, 2021)
- Old Soul (Sofa Boy, 2021)
- Afterimage (Sofa Boy, 2022)
- Re:Forest (Sofa Boy, 2023)
- Sunchaser (Sofa Boy, 2024)
- Figure in the Dark (Sofa Boy, 2024)
- Glow (Sofa Boy, 2024)
- UNREAD (Wax Bodega, 2026)

== Personnel ==
=== Current members ===
- Devin Yüceil – guitar, lead vocals (2010–present)
- Glen Hodgson – guitar, backing vocals (2010–present)
- Dave Jackson – bass, backing vocals (2013–present)
- Dave Morgan — drums, backing vocals (2025–present)

=== Former members ===
- Maria Sullivan – bass (2010–2013)
- Adam Brodigan – drums (2010–2013)
- Blake Mostyn – drums, backing vocals (2013–2025)
