= Funemployed (EP) =

Album by Gnarwolves

EP by Gnarwolves
- Released: 17 June 2013 (UK)
- Genre: Punk rock, pop punk, skate punk
- Length: 9:29
- Label: Big Scary Monsters Recording Company

Gnarwolves chronology
CRU (2012)	Funemployed (2013)	Chronicles of Gnarnia (2014)

Professional ratings
Review scores
Source	Rating
Kerrang	4/5 stars
Rock Sound	7/10 stars

Funemployed is a four-track EP by British punk rock band Gnarwolves released on 17 June 2013 through Big Scary Monsters. All four tracks would later appear on the compilation album Chronicles of Gnarnia.

== Track listing ==
All music is composed by Gnarwolves

No.	Title	Length
1.	"Melody Has Big Plans"	2:51
2.	"Tongue Surfer"	1:40
3.	"Limerence"	2:48
4.	"High on a Wire"	2:13
Total length:		9:29

== Personnel ==
Gnarwolves

- Thom Weeks - Vocals/Guitar
- Charlie Piper - Vocals/Bass
- Max Weeks - Drums
