= Adolescence (EP) =

EP by Gnarwolves
- Released: 13 November 2015 (UK)
- Genres: Punk rock, skate punk, hardcore punk
- Label: Pure Noise Records

Gnarwolves chronology
Gnarwolves (2014)	Adolescence (2015)	Outsiders (2017)

Adolescence is a four track EP by British punk rock band Gnarwolves. It was released on 13 November 2015 through Big Scary Monsters in the United Kingdom on 300 on Green & Orange vinyl and 200 on Limited Edition Screenprinted B-Side.

== Track listing ==
All music is composed by Gnarwolves.

No.	Title	Length
1.	"The Waiting Line"	2:18
2.	"Daydreamer"	2:37
3.	"Blondie"	1:31
4.	"Bad Dreams"	2:03
Total length:		8:29

== Personnel ==
Gnarwolves

- Thom Weeks - Vocals/Guitar
- Charlie Piper - Vocals/Bass
- Max Weeks - Drums
