= London Royal =

Studio album by Get Cape. Wear Cape. Fly
- Released: 12 September 2014
- Genres: Alternative rock, indie rock, folk
- Length: 40:35
- Label: Alcopop! Records

Get Cape. Wear Cape. Fly chronology
Maps (2012)	London Royal (2014)

London Royal is the fifth studio album from English singer-songwriter Get Cape. Wear Cape. Fly, released on 12 September 2014 on Alcopop! Records.

== Track listing ==
All music is composed by Get Cape. Wear Cape. Fly.

No.	Title	Length
1.	"Remember"	4:53
2.	"Recession Song"	4:05
3.	"Forgiveness"	3:25
4.	"The Inquest"	3:26
5.	"The Argument"	3:01
6.	"Life on the Touchline"	3:39
7.	"Breaking News"	3:44
8.	"Upsides"	4:51
9.	"Fineline"	4:09
10.	"After Hours"	5:22
Total length:		40:35

== Personnel ==
- Get Cape. Wear Cape. Fly – guitar/vocals
