= CRU (EP) =

EP by Gnarwolves
- Released: 16 July 2012 (UK)
- Genre: Punk rock, pop punk, skate punk, emo
- Length: 12:02
- Label: Big Scary Monsters Recording Company, Tangled Talk Records

Gnarwolves chronology
Fun Club (2011)	CRU (2012)	Funemployed (2013)

Professional ratings
Review scores
Source	Rating
Alter the Press	4.5/5 stars
Fortitude Magazine	4/5 stars
Punktastic	4.5/5 stars

CRU is a six track EP by British punk rock band Gnarwolves released on 16 July 2012 through BSM Recordings and Tangled Talk Records. All six tracks would later appear on the compilation album Chronicles of Gnarnia. All the song titles on this EP are references to the book Brave New World.

== Track listing ==
All music is composed by Gnarwolves

No.	Title	Length
1.	"History Is Bunk"	1:44
2.	"We Want the Whip!"	1:50
3.	"Community, Stability, Identity"	2:11
4.	"A Gram Is Better Than a Damn"	1:47
5.	"Oh, Brave New World"	2:01
6.	"Coffee"	2:32
Total length:		12:02

== Personnel ==
Gnarwolves

- Thom Weeks - Vocals/Guitar
- Charlie Piper - Vocals/Bass
- Max Weeks - Drums

Production

- Wolfmask - Art
