= Outsiders (album) =

Studio album by Gnarwolves
- Released: 5 May 2017
- Genre: Punk rock, pop punk, skate punk
- Length: 33:16
- Label: Big Scary Monsters Recording Company, Pure Noise Records

Gnarwolves chronology
Adolescence (2015)	Outsiders (2017)

Outsiders is the second and final studio album by the British punk rock band Gnarwolves, released on 5 May 2017.

Professional ratings
Review scores
Source	Rating
Rock Sound	8/10 stars

== Track listing ==
All music is composed by Gnarwolves

No.	Title	Length
1.	"Straitjacket"	2:32
2.	"Car Crash Cinema"	2:45
3.	"Wires"	3:17
4.	"Paint Me A Martyr"	2:42
5.	"English Kids"	3:08
6.	"Argument"	3:44
7.	"The Comedown"	2:05
8.	"Talking To Your Ghost"	3:13
9.	"Channeling Brian Molko"	2:58
10.	"Shut Up"	6:54
Total length:		33:16

== Personnel ==
- Thom Weeks – vocals, guitar
- Charlie Piper – vocals, bass
- Max Weeks – drums
