= Get Cape. Wear Cape. Fly (album) =

Album by Get Cape. Wear Cape. Fly

Studio album by Get Cape. Wear Cape. Fly
- Released: 13 September 2010
- Recorded: 2010
- Genre: folk rock, folktronica, indie
- Label: Cooking Vinyl

Get Cape. Wear Cape. Fly chronology
Covers (2009)	Get Cape. Wear Cape. Fly (2010)	Maps (2012)

Professional ratings
Review scores
Source	Rating
God is in the TV	2/5 stars
musicOMH	4/5 stars
Rock Sound	7/10 stars

Get Cape. Wear Cape. Fly is the self-titled third album by Get Cape. Wear Cape. Fly. It was released on 13 September 2010.

== Track listing ==
1. "Hand Me Downs"
2. "Collapsing Cities"
3. "Nightlife"
4. "All of This is Yours (feat. Baaba Maal)"
5. "Queen For a Day"
6. "All Falls Down"
7. "Where Will You Stand?"
8. "Stitch by Stitch (plus Interlude)"
9. "The Uprising"
10. "The Plot"
11. "Morning Light"
