= Jeniferever =

Swedish post-rock band

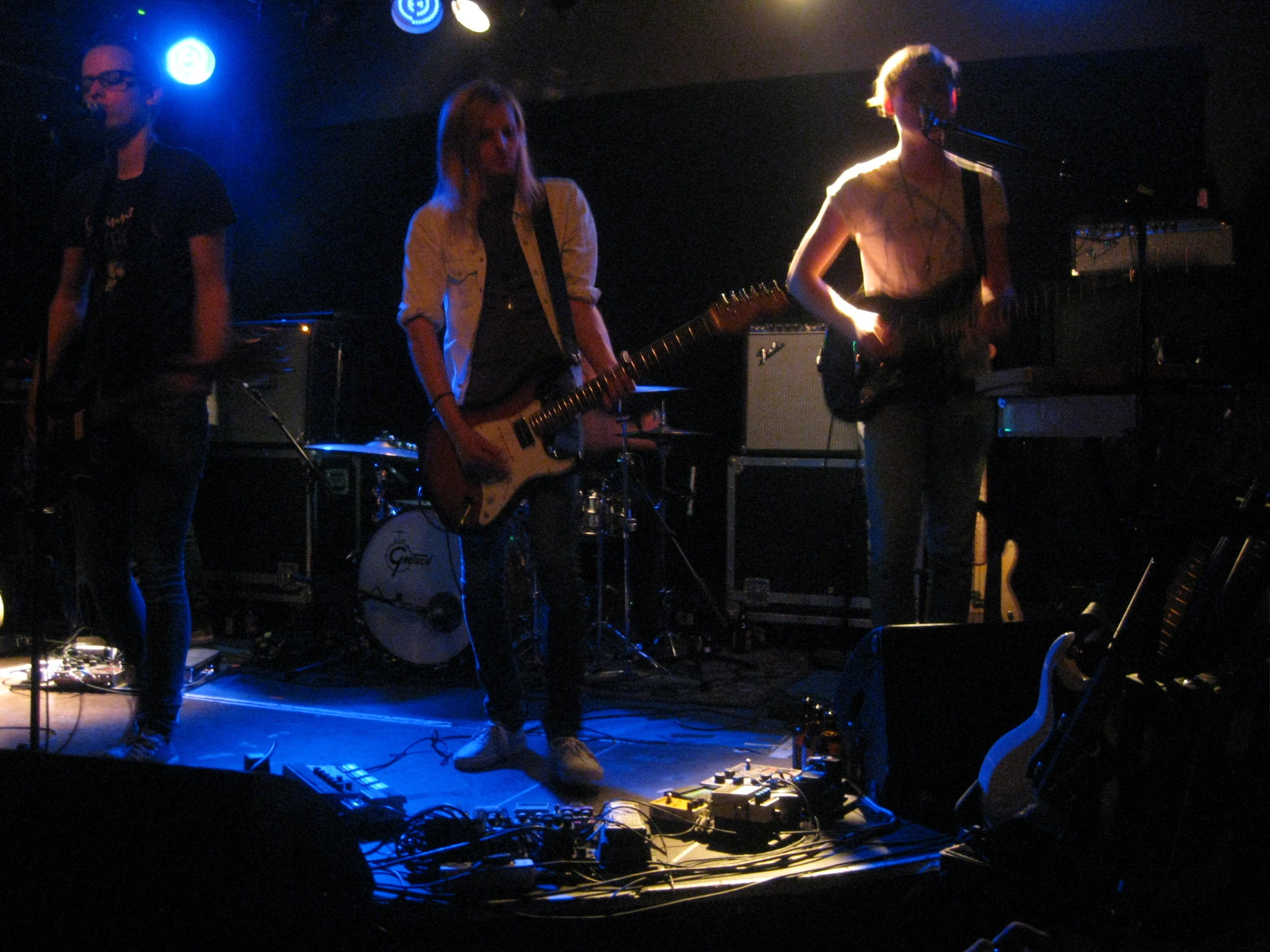
- Jeniferever performing in 2011

Background information
- Origin: Uppsala, Sweden
- Genres: Post-rock
- Years active: 1996–present
- Labels: Big Scary Monsters; Drowned in Sound; Monotreme
- Members: Kristofer Jönson; Martin Sandström; Olle Bilius; Fredrik Aspelin
- Website: jeniferever.com

Jeniferever is a band from Uppsala, Sweden formed in 1996. Their music could be described as ambient indie rock or post-rock; it is slow-paced, melodic, and frequently building to an orchestral-like climax. Their sound has been compared to bands such as The Appleseed Cast and Sigur Rós. Their name is derived from a 1989 Smashing Pumpkins song of the same name.

They released a four track EP Iris on the Big Scary Monsters Recording Company label. Their debut full-length record Choose a Bright Morning was released on Drowned in Sound Recordings and was later re-released through Monotreme Records. Their second album Spring Tides was released on Monotreme Records in 2009. The band released its third album Silesia on 11 April 2011. A track from Silesia, "Waifs & Strays", was released for free download in January 2011. The band have not officially announced that they have disbanded, but have been on a long-term hiatus since 2012, moving on to form another band, Ştiu Nu Ştiu.

== Members ==
- Kristofer Jönson – lead vocals, guitar, keyboards
- Martin Sandström – guitar, backing vocals
- Olle Bilius – bass, guitar, keyboards, backing vocals
- Fredrik Aspelin – drums, backing vocals

== Discography ==
=== Albums ===
- Choose a Bright Morning (2006)
- Spring Tides (2009)
- Silesia (2011)

=== EPs ===
- Chronicles of Omega (2001)
- Jeniferever (2002)
- Jeniferever / The Next Autumn Soundtrack (split EP with The Next Autumn Soundtrack) (2003)
- Iris (2004)
- Nangijala (2008)

=== Singles ===
- "From Across the Sea" (2006)
- "The Sound of Beating Wings" (2006)
- "Alvik" (2006)
- "To the Beat of Our Own Blood" (2011)
