= Chronicles of Gnarnia =

Compilation album by Gnarwolves
- Released: 24 February 2014 (UK)
- Genre: Punk rock, pop punk, skate punk
- Length: 31:01
- Label: Beach Community, Pure Noise Records
- Producer: Various

Gnarwolves chronology
Funemployed (2013)	Chronicles of Gnarnia (2014)	Gnarwolves (2014)

Professional ratings
Review scores
Source	Rating
Absolute Punk	83%

Chronicles of Gnarnia is a compilation album by the British punk rock band Gnarwolves, released 24 February 2014. The album compiles songs from Gnarwolves first three EPs, Fun Club, CRU and Funemployed.

== Track listing ==
All tracks are written by Gnarwolves

No.	Title	Length
1.	"Party Jams"	1:48
2.	"Decay"	2:15
3.	"No Time for Old Bones"	1:32
4.	"Reaper"	2:07
5.	"Chlorine in the Jean Pule"	1:38
6.	"History Is Bunk"	1:44
7.	"We Want The Whip!"	1:50
8.	"Community, Stability, Identity"	2:11
9.	"A Gram Is Better Than a Damn"	1:47
10.	"Oh, Brave New World"	2:01
11.	"Coffee"	2:32
12.	"Melody Has Big Plans"	2:51
13.	"Tongue Surfer"	1:40
14.	"Limerence"	2:48
15.	"High on a Wire"	2:13
Total length:		31:01

== Personnel ==
Gnarwolves

- Thom Weeks - Vocals/Guitar
- Charlie Piper - Vocals/Bass
- Max Weeks - Drums
