= Tezcatlipōca (EP) =

EP by Tubelord
- Released: August 16, 2010
- Genre: Alternative rock
- Length: 11:02
- Label: Hassle
- Producer: Steve Albini

Tubelord chronology
Our First American Friends (2009)	Tezcatlipōca (2010)	Romance (2011)

Singles from Tezcatlipōca
- 1. "Bazel" Released: 26 February 2011

Professional ratings
Review scores
Source	Rating
Rocksound	8/10 stars
panicdots.com	75%
musicfansmic.com	(9.2/10)

Tezcatlipōca (tehs-cah-tlee-poh'-cah) is an EP by Tubelord. This is the first release post Our First American Friends which showcases the new line-up since ex-bassist Sean Bamberger left in 2009, with new members James Elliot Field and Tom Coulson-Smith. The EP consists of three songs and one bonus track that was released on the 16 August 2010 by Hassle Records.

One single "Bazel" was released from the EP on 26 February 2011

== Track listing ==
All music is composed by Xoey Fourr and Tubelord

No.	Title	Length
1.	"Arbor"	3:19
2.	"Ratchet"	3:00
3.	"Bazel"	3:00
4.	"De"	1:45
Total length:		11:02

== Personnel ==
Tubelord

- Xoey Fourr - guitar, lead vocals
- Tom Coulson-Smith - bass guitar
- David Catmur - drums, backing vocals, percussion
- James Elliot Field - piano, keyboard, percussion

Additional personnel

- Mikey Glenister – cornet on "Ratchet"
