= Choose a Bright Morning =

Studio album by Jeniferever
- Released: March 13, 2006
- Genre: Post-rock
- Length: 60:25
- Label: Drowned in Sound

Professional ratings
Review scores
Source	Rating
Stylus Magazine	B
BBC Collective	4/5 stars

Choose a Bright Morning was the first album recorded by post-rock band Jeniferever, released on March 13, 2006. It had been preceded by two EPs - Jeniferever in 2002 and Iris in 2004. It was their first release on the Drowned in Sound label, and two singles were taken from it, "From Across the Sea" and "The Sound Of Beating Wings".

== Track listing ==
1. "From Across the Sea" – 6:05
2. "Swimming Eyes" – 7:03
3. "Alvik" – 6:38
4. "A Ghost In The Corner Of Your Eye" – 5:32
5. "Winter Nights" – 11:07
6. "The Sound Of Beating Wings" – 6:59
7. "Marks" – 4:30
8. "Magdeleno" – 3:29
9. "Opposites Attract" – 9:02
