= Gnarwolves =

English punk band

- Origin: Brighton, England
- Genres: Punk rock, skate punk, pop punk, melodic hardcore, emo
- Years active: 2011–2018
- Labels: Tangled Talk, Day by Day, Big Scary Monsters, Pure Noise
- Members: Thom Weeks; Charlie Piper; Max Weeks
- Website: gnarwolves.com

Gnarwolves were a British punk rock band, formed in 2011 and based in Brighton, England. The band consisted of vocalist and guitarist Thom Weeks, bass guitarist and vocalist Charlie Piper, and drummer Max Weeks.

== History ==
=== Formation, and early recordings (2011–2013) ===
Although originally from Cornwall, Gnarwolves formed in the later stages of 2011 in Brighton and on 1 December, the band released their debut EP, Fun Club. Although, the EP would later be re-released on 16 July 2012 sporting a different album cover, with four more songs covering the bands of; Converge, Green Day, Black Flag and AFI. They cited influences including Hot Water Music, Pennywise, Suicidal Tendencies, Dag Nasty, Cloud Nothings and Ramones.

The band spent much of the next two years touring the United Kingdom and Europe. On 16 July 2012 the band would release their second EP, CRU. In just under one year later the band would also release their third EP, Funemployed. Both EP's would go on to garner wide critical acclaim and praise from mainstream publications such as Kerrang! and Rock Sound among many others.

=== Chronicles of Gnarnia, debut album, and Adolescence (2014–2016) ===
On 24 February 2014 the band released a compilation album, Chronicles of Gnarnia, compiled of songs from Gnarwolves first three EPs. Absolute Punk stated that "Chronicles of Gnarnia is not just a measurement of tales over time, but how genuine the band is. They don't care to play by the rules of typical pop punk as their influences stretch between emo, hardcore, folk punk and alternative pop.".

On 15 July 2014 Gnarwolves announced that their debut album would be called Gnarwolves and would be released on 15 September 2014 through Pure Noise Records with Zane Lowe featuring their new single Smoking Kills on his BBC Radio 1 show.

The band opened for Blink-182 on the Italian leg of their European tour and opened the main stage of Reading and Leeds Festivals in 2014. The band went on their first ever United States tour in October 2014 alongside The Story So Far, The Wonder Years and Modern Baseball.

On 13 November 2015, Gnarwolves released their fourth EP, Adolescence. The release of Adolescence was followed by a European tour supported by Great Cynics then Boxkite from 17 November, to 2 December. This was then followed by a tour in the United Kingdom with Spraynard and Such Gold between 8–18 December.

=== Outsiders (2017–2018) ===
In February 2017, Gnarwolves announced their second studio album, Outsiders, to be released on 5 May 2017.

On 14 November 2017, a woman came forward on Twitter accusing Max Weeks of sexually assaulting her at a club in Glasgow whilst they were on tour with The Story So Far in 2013. Max later admitted to this in a statement on Facebook and apologized to the survivor for his behavior.

The band announced they were going on a break in January 2018, after their final shows in London, where their entire discography was played in full. Following this bassist Charlie formed a new Brighton based band, High Praise and released their debut EP in June 2019. Thom and Max have recorded two albums in the last two years, Like Gretsch as Binboy and Seagull Boys as Seagull Boys.

== Band members ==
- Thom Weeks – vocals, guitar (2011–2018)
- Charlie Piper – bass guitar, vocals (2011–2018)
- Max Weeks – drums (2011–2018)

== Discography ==
Studio albums

- Gnarwolves (2014)
- Outsiders (2017)
