= The Chronicles of a Bohemian Teenager =

Studio album by Get Cape. Wear Cape. Fly
- Released: 18 September 2006
- Recorded: 2005–2006
- Genre: Folktronica, folk rock, indie
- Length: 39:34
- Label: Atlantic
- Producer: Sam Duckworth

Get Cape. Wear Cape. Fly chronology
The Chronicles of a Bohemian Teenager (2006)	Searching for the Hows and Whys (2008)

Professional ratings
Review scores
Source	Rating
AllMusic	3/5 stars
The Guardian	4/5 stars
NME	(8/10) (Magazine Dated: 16 September 2006, p.37)
Punktastic	4/5 stars

The Chronicles of a Bohemian Teenager is the first album by singer-songwriter Sam Duckworth, alias Get Cape. Wear Cape. Fly. Recorded mostly in his bedroom studio in Essex, it was released on 18 September 2006 on Atlantic Records.

While The Guardian complained that "Duckworth's style can get a little samey", allmusic.com's review said that he "is not particularly different from the other vaguely introspective young singer/songwriters out there.... with his plaintive, often monotonous and sometimes whiny vocals" and that his "simple acoustic guitar chords can get a little repetitive". The album is certified as Silver in the U.K., having sold over 60,000 copies.

"I-Spy", "Call Me Ishmael", "The Chronicles of a Bohemian Teenager (Part One)" and "War of the Worlds" were all released as singles, the first two as a double A-side.

The Track "If I Had £1 for Every Stale Song Title I'd Be 30 Short of Getting Out of this Mess" was originally titled "The Chronicles of a Bohemian Teenager (Part Four)”.

In 2021, the album was re-released on gold heavyweight vinyl to celebrate the record's 15th anniversary. A subsequent tour, due to celebrate the reissue in Autumn 2021, was postponed until 2022 over insurance fears relating to the COVID-19 pandemic.

== Track listing ==
All music is composed by Get Cape. Wear Cape. Fly.

No.	Title	Length
1.	"Once More with Feeling"	2:04
2.	"An Oak Tree"	2:29
3.	"The Chronicles of a Bohemian Teenager (Part 2)"	3:27
4.	"I-Spy"	3:24
5.	"The Lighthousekeeper"	2:54
6.	"War of the Worlds"	2:33
7.	"Get Cape. Wear Cape. Fly"	3:56
8.	"Glasshouses"	3:44
9.	"Whitewash Is Brainwash"	4:37
10.	"Call Me Ishmael"	3:54
11.	"If I Had £1 for Every Stale Song Title I'd Be 30 Short of Getting Out of this Mess"	3:13
12.	"The Chronicles of a Bohemian Teenager (Part 1)"	4:06
Total length:		39:34
