= Melancholia Hymns =

Studio album by Arcane Roots
- Released: 15 September 2017
- Genres: Alternative rock, progressive rock, electronica
- Length: 54:05
- Labels: Easy Life Records, Red Essential Records
- Producer: Chris Coulter

Arcane Roots chronology
Blood & Chemistry (2013)	Melancholia Hymns (2017)

Melancholia Hymns is the second and final full-length studio album by the British alternative rock band Arcane Roots, released on 15 September 2017.

== Release and Promotion ==
Matter, the album's second single, was played for the first time on 21 May 2017 during The Rock Show with Daniel P. Carter on BBC Radio 1. On 11 September 2017 BBC Radio 1 DJ Annie Mac made the song Indigo her "Hottest Record In The World" for the week.

Upon its release, it reached 20 in the mid-week UK chart, finally reaching number 56 on the albums chart, number 6 on the Rock & Metal albums chart and number 25 on the Vinyl Albums Chart.

== Reception ==
Professional ratings
Review scores
Source	Rating
Already Heard	4.5/5
Classic Rock	3.5/5 stars
Dead Press	4.5/5
DIY	2/5 stars
Prog	(positive)
Sound Sphere	4/5 stars
Stereoboard	(80%)

The album received mixed to positive reviews from critics.

At the end of the year, the album was featured on the year of end lists of publications like Kerrang! (Number 31), The Independent (Number 5), and Rockshot Magazine.

== Track listing ==
All tracks are written by Arcane Roots.

Melancholia Hymns
No.	Title	Length
1.	"Before Me"	5:56
2.	"Matter"	4:53
3.	"Indigo"	6:31
4.	"Off the Floor"	4:14
5.	"Curtains"	5:17
6.	"Solemn"	5:41
7.	"Arp"	4:22
8.	"Fireflies"	6:11
9.	"Everything (All at Once)"	3:43
10.	"Half the World"	7:17
Total length:		54:05

== Charts ==
Chart (2017)	Peak position
Scottish Albums (Official Charts)	42
UK Albums (Official Charts)	56
UK Rock & Metal Albums (Official Charts)	6
