= Brain matter =

Brain matter may refer to:

- Brain tissue generally, or, specifically:
  - Gray matter, containing numerous cell bodies
  - White matter, primarily made up of myelinated axons
