= Get Cape. Wear Cape. Fly =

Sam Duckworth
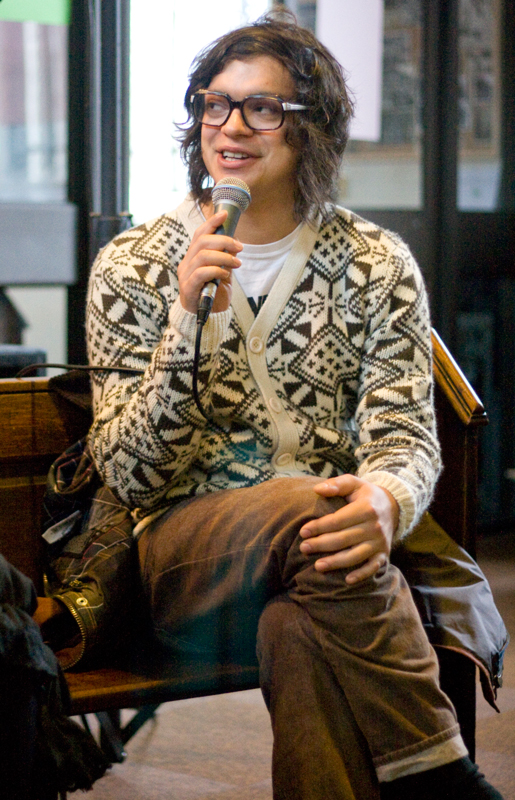
- Duckworth in 2010

Background information
- Also known as: Get Cape. Wear Cape. Fly
- Born: Sam Duckworth; January 30, 1986 (age 40)
- Origin: Southend, Essex, England
- Genres: Indie rock, electroacoustic
- Occupations: Singer/songwriter guitarist
- Instruments: vocals, acoustic guitar
- Years active: 2004–present
- Labels: Alcopop! Atlantic; Cooking Vinyl; Big Scary Monsters; Xtra Mile Recordings

Sam Duckworth (born 30 January 1986) is an English musician who performs as Get Cape. Wear Cape. Fly. He is also sometimes referred to as Get Cape, Cape, GCWCF and Slam Dunkworth (the latter title apparently first coined by Emmy the Great). According to Duckworth, his original stage name came from Retro Gamer magazine, from an article about superhero games such as Batman containing the heading "Get Cape. Wear Cape. Fly", although a Calvin & Hobbes cartoon by Bill Watterson has also been cited. In addition to the Get Cape name, and his given name, Duckworth has released music under the moniker Recreations.

== Music career ==
Duckworth grew up in Southend-on-Sea, Essex. Get Cape was signed to Atlantic Records in March 2006, after playing many gigs, both with punk rock band Silverskin and as Get Cape. As Get Cape, Duckworth has collaborated with Billy Bragg, Nitin Sawhney, Shlomo, Killa Kela, Baba Maal, Flea, Kate Nash and many others with his participation in many events for Africa Express.

Duckworth co-organised The Demolition Ball – the last night at the London Astoria venue before it was knocked down in January 2009. He had previously headlined at the Astoria for his 21st birthday party.

After 10 years, Duckworth decided to end Get Cape. Wear Cape. Fly and to continue making under his own name. The "last ever" show under the Get Cape moniker was held at The Forum, Kentish Town on 12 September 2014.

In May 2017, Duckworth announced that he was resurrecting the Get Cape name, with the release of the single Optimist, and subsequently announced a new full-length album, Young Adult, due for release in January 2018.

=== The Chronicles of a Bohemian Teenager ===
Get Cape's debut album, The Chronicles of a Bohemian Teenager, is best described as an indie/folk/electronic fusion. The album made the top 100 albums of 2006 lists of Q and NME. It reached number 26 on the UK Albums Chart and spawned three top 40 singles.

In October 2006, he performed as part of the BBC Electric Proms. He played at a number of major festivals in 2007, including Oxegen, Glastonbury, Reading and Leeds Festivals and SXSW, and appeared in the BBC Radio 1 live lounge.

In January 2007, Duckworth was nominated for best solo artist at the annual NME Awards, up against Lily Allen, Jamie T, Jarvis Cocker and Thom Yorke, although he did not win.

The Album is gold certified in the UK.

=== Searching for the Hows and Whys ===
Get Cape's second album, Searching for the Hows and Whys was released on 3 March 2008. It features guest vocals from Kate Nash on the track, "Better Things". The album also features Billy Bragg on "Interlude". "Waiting for the Monster to Drown" was released as a free download via Get Cape's official website and MySpace on 7 December 2007. The first single released from the album was "Find The Time" which was released on 3 March 2008, and reached number 33 on the UK Singles Chart. The album was co produced with Nitin Sawhney

In support of this album, Get Cape. Wear Cape. Fly performed on The Pyramid Stage at the 2008 Glastonbury Festival

=== Get Cape. Wear Cape. Fly. [Self-titled] ===
The third and self-titled album was released on Cooking Vinyl on 13 September 2010, with the first single from the album "Collapsing Cities Feat. Shy FX" released on 9 August 2010. The album cover artwork was created by artist Jon Kipps and photographer Joe Lang.

=== The Mannequin ===
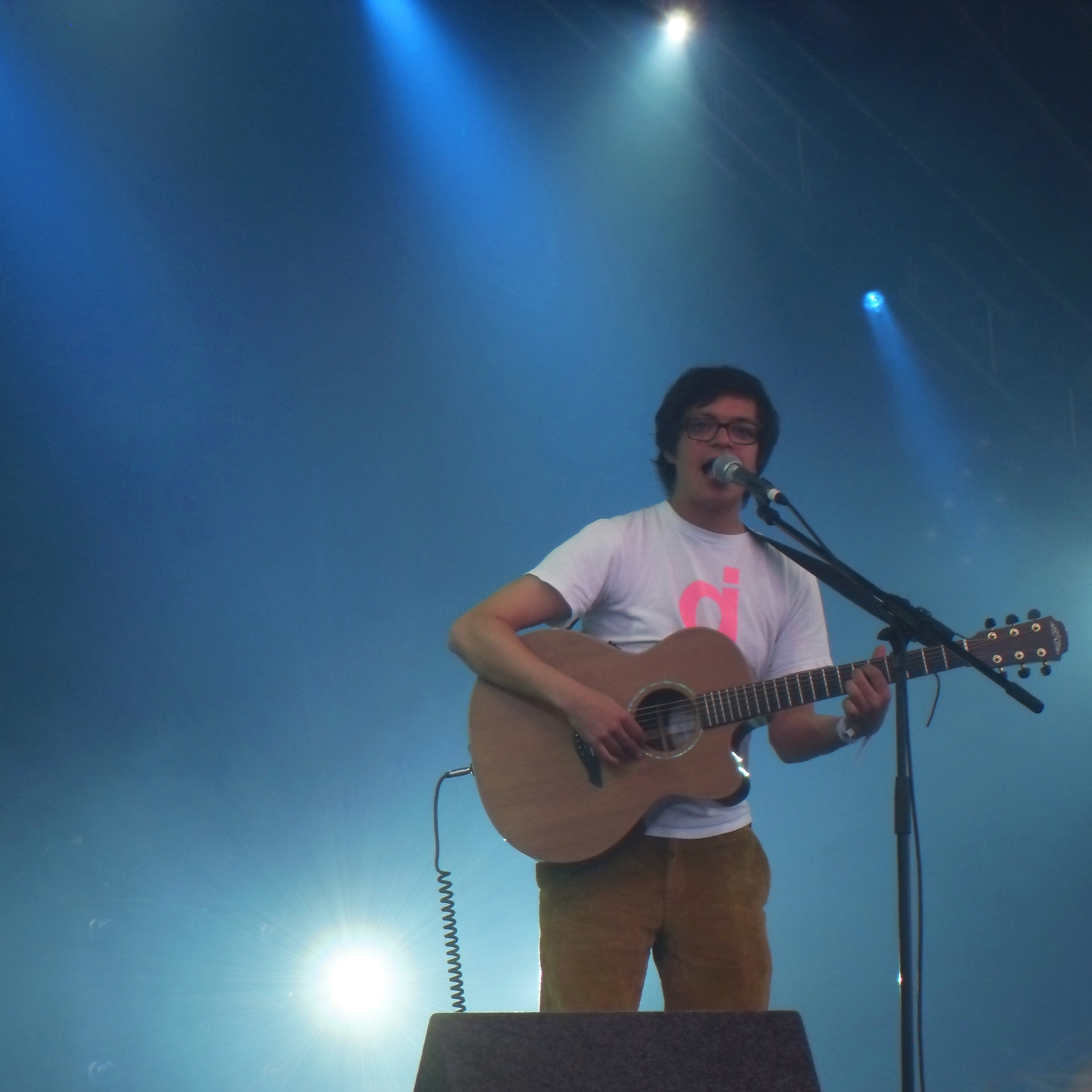
Sam Duckworth performing in 2011

The Mannequin is the first album released under the name Sam Duckworth rather than 'Get Cape. Wear Cape. Fly.'

=== Maps ===
The fourth Get Cape. Wear Cape. Fly album was released on 7 May 2012.

=== London Royal ===
The fifth Get Cape. Wear Cape. Fly album was released on 15 September 2014 on Alcopop! Records. This accompanied a farewell UK tour between 28 August and 12 September.

=== Young Adult ===
The sixth Get Cape. Wear Cape. Fly album was due to be released in January 2018 through Xtra Mile Recordings. Singles from the release include "Adults/Always", "Just A Phase", "DNA" and "VHS Forever".

In March and April 2019, Get Cape. Wear Cape. Fly opened for Pink Floyd's Nick Mason's Saucerful of Secrets on their 27 Date North American Tour.

=== Production ===
Duckworth co wrote the song "Apples" on the 4th album from Lily Allen titled No Shame (Lily Allen album) The song was performed at the 2018 Mercury Prize ceremony.

Get Cape. Wear Cape. Fly produced the fourth album from Benjamin Francis Leftwich titled "To Carry A Whale" released June 18, 2021.

Sam Duckworth produced the single "Chasing Daylight" from the sophomore EP from Noahfinnce released on May 11, 2022 on Hopeless Records.

In 2023 Sam Duckworth co wrote and produced/mixed an ep with Afrobeat legend Dele Sosimi for a new project entitled Dele Sosimi and the Estuary 21. The ensemble recorded a session at Maida Vale Studios for the Jazz show with Jamie Cullum on BBC Radio 2 in May 2023 to celebrate its release on Wah Wah 45s. The first single - Mo Se Bo La Tan (Feat: Get Cape. Wear Cape. Fly) / Ride Out The Storm was playlisted by BBC 6 Music (B List) and Jazz FM (UK) (A List).

In 2021, Duckworth worked with Southend singer-songwriter Frances Murray and her BLAB recording project. BLAB is signed to Asylums' Cool Thing Records and has put out a number of tracks produced by Duckworth including "Eton Mess", "Gemini" and "Insurance".

== Television ==
On 24 March 2008, he performed on Hollyoaks as part of a gig staged in the village. He also had an episode of American TV show One Tree Hill named after him. Every episode of the show has a title with a musical theme, either a song title or band name. Episode 3 of season 6 of One Tree Hill is titled "Get Cape. Wear Cape. Fly."

== Personal life ==
Duckworth grew up in Southend-on-Sea and attended Southend High School for Boys between 1997 and 2004, studying up to A-level. He is well known for his debating and love for a variety of different musical styles. He has had run-ins with the British National Party after a racist attack in a nightclub which led to the song "Glasshouses", and he has since become an avid supporter of Love Music Hate Racism. He is a Fairtrade supporter.

Duckworth also took part in Oxfam's Blue campaign at Glastonbury which was shot by photographer Rankin.

In 2019 Duckworth co-produced a gala at Kings Place in London with Lily Allen called "Last Registration" in the run up to the General Election. These were released as a podcast series called "Arty Political Broadcast" and featured: Reni Eddo Lodge, Jordan Stephens, Guilaine Kinouani, George Lamb, Gizzi Erskine, Tansy Hoskins and a host of prominent activists and speakers.

== Discography ==
=== Albums ===
Year	Alias	Title	Label	Chart
2006	Get Cape. Wear Cape. Fly	The Chronicles of a Bohemian Teenager	Atlantic	#26 (UK Albums)
2008	Get Cape. Wear Cape. Fly	Searching for the Hows and Whys	Atlantic	#30 (UK Albums)
2010	Get Cape. Wear Cape. Fly	Get Cape. Wear Cape. Fly	Cooking Vinyl	#89 (UK Albums)
2011	Sam Duckworth	The Mannequin	Cooking Vinyl	—
2012	Get Cape. Wear Cape. Fly	Maps	Cooking Vinyl	#103 (UK Albums)
2014	Get Cape. Wear Cape. Fly	London Royal	Alcopop!	—
2015	Sam Duckworth	Amazing Grace	Alcopop!	—
2016	Recreations	Baby Boomers 2	Xtra Mile Recordings	—
2017	Sam Duckworth	Kingdoms	Xtra Mile Recordings	—
2018	Get Cape. Wear Cape. Fly	Young Adult	Xtra Mile Recordings	#142 (UK Albums)

=== EPs ===
Year	Alias	Title	Label	Chart
2004	Get Cape. Wear Cape. Fly	Split with The Remarkable Rocket	BSM	—
2005	Get Cape. Wear Cape. Fly	Get Cape. Wear Cape. Fly	BSM	—
2006	Get Cape. Wear Cape. Fly	Split with Dave House	BSM / Gravity DIP	—
2009	Get Cape. Wear Cape. Fly	Covers	Pure Groove	—
2011	Sam Duckworth	Angels in the Snow	Cooking Vinyl	—
2014	Get Cape. Wear Cape. Fly / Sam Duckworth	Starrcade	Alcopop!	—
2015	Recreations / Sam Duckworth	Lifestyle Concept Store	self released	—
2016	Recreations	Digital Ghettos	Xtra Mile Recordings	—
2016	Recreations	Live at Lux	Xtra Mile Recordings	—
2016	Recreations	Live on Southend Pier	Post/Pop Records	—
2016	Recreations	Beaches Ain't Shit	Xtra Mile Recordings	—
2020	Get Cape. Wear Cape. Fly	Hold Tight	Self-released	—
2023	Get Cape. Wear Cape. Fly	Monopolies	Self-released	—

=== Singles ===
Year	Alias	Title	Label	Chart	Album
2006	Get Cape. Wear Cape. Fly	I Spy / Call Me Ishmael	Atlantic	—	The Chronicles of a Bohemian Teenager
2006	Get Cape. Wear Cape. Fly	The Chronicles of a Bohemian Teenager (Part One)	Atlantic	#38 (UK Singles)	The Chronicles of a Bohemian Teenager
2006	Get Cape. Wear Cape. Fly	War of the Worlds	Atlantic	#39 (UK Singles)	The Chronicles of a Bohemian Teenager
2007	Get Cape. Wear Cape. Fly	I Spy	Atlantic	#37 (UK Singles)	The Chronicles of a Bohemian Teenager
2007	Get Cape. Wear Cape. Fly	Waiting for the Monster to Drown	Atlantic	—	Searching for the Hows and Whys
2008	Get Cape. Wear Cape. Fly	Find the Time	Atlantic	#33 (UK Singles)	Searching for the Hows and Whys
2008	Get Cape. Wear Cape. Fly	Keep Singing Out	Atlantic	—	Searching for the Hows and Whys
2010	Get Cape. Wear Cape. Fly	Collapsing Cities	Cooking Vinyl	—	Get Cape. Wear Cape. Fly
2017	Get Cape. Wear Cape. Fly	Optimist	Xtra Mile Recordings	—	Non-album single

== Other contributors ==
Other members of the Get Cape. Wear Cape. Fly live band have included:

- Mikey Glenister – Cornet
- Andy Theakstone – Drums
- Gavin Fitzjohn – Trumpet, Sax
- Jamie Allen – Bass Guitar
- Tom Pinder – Trombone
- Tim Oliver – Keyboards
- Chris Bradshaw – Guitar
