= Searching for the Hows and Whys =

Studio album by Get Cape. Wear Cape. Fly
- Released: 3 March 2008
- Recorded: 2007
- Genre: folk rock, folktronica, indie
- Length: 45:29
- Label: Atlantic
- Producer: Sam Duckworth, Nitin Sawhney

Get Cape. Wear Cape. Fly chronology
The Chronicles of a Bohemian Teenager (2006)	Searching for the Hows and Whys (2008)	Covers (2009)

Searching for the Hows and Whys is the second album by Get Cape. Wear Cape. Fly. It was released on 3 March 2008. The record was co-produced by Sam Duckworth and Nitin Sawhney. "Waiting for the Monster to Drown" was released as a free download via Get Cape's official website and Myspace on 7 December 2007.

The album was released early by iTunes and was subsequently leaked onto the internet.

== Track listing ==
1. "Let the Journey Begin"
2. "Waiting for the Monster to Drown"
3. "Young and Lovestruck"
4. "Postcards from Catalunya"
5. "The Children Are (the Consumers of) the Future"
6. "Window of Your Mind"
7. "I Could Build You a Tower"
8. "Interlude"
9. "Keep Singing Out"
10. "Moving Forward"
11. "Find the Time"
12. "This Could Be All"
13. "Better Things" (featuring Kate Nash)
14. "Could've Seen It All"

== Trivia ==
The song "Better Things" was originally titled "White Lines, Road Signs and Vacuous Desires: The Life and Times of A Disenfranchised Rockstar" and first featured as a B-Side to the "I-Spy" single. Unlike the album version however, vocals are provided by Sam Duckworth only.
