= Talons (band) =

English rock band

- Origin: Hereford, England
- Genres: Instrumental, post-rock, hardcore punk, alternative rock
- Years active: 2008–present
- Labels: Big Scary Monsters Topshelf Records
- Members: Oliver Steels - Guitar; Reuben Brunt - Violin; Sam Little - Violin; Chris Hicks - Bass Guitar; Alex Macdougall - Drums; Sam Jarvis - Guitar
- Website: www.gotalons.com

Talons are an English rock band from Hereford, formed in 2008. They have previously played together in bands belonging to the Hereford music scene. They mostly play instrumental, the band has no vocalists at all.

== Career ==
Talons formed in 2008 as a reincarnation of an older band, Kites, with an altered line up.

They signed to Big Scary Monsters in 2009, releasing their debut single, "The Pearl" in late summer. Once the band began to tour heavily, they released three singles in the buildup to a full-length record. An anthology of all Talons' work prior to Hollow Realm was released, entitled Commemorations.

The band recorded their debut album, Hollow Realm in the summer of 2010, with Tom Woodhead (Forward Russia) at the helm as producer. It was released in November 2010, the CD released by Big Scary Monsters and 12" vinyl by Topshelf Records. It received critical acclaim, notably by Mike Diver for BBC Music and Drowned In Sound. The band then spent the next couple of years touring around Europe to promote Hollow Realm.

In 2014, Talons released their second studio album, entitled New Topographics.

The band recorded their third album in August 2017. The album entitled "We All Know" was released on 27 July 2018 by Holy Roar Records.

In March 2022, violinist Sam Little died.

== Discography ==
=== Albums ===
- Commemorations (Compilation of all work prior to Hollow Realm) (2010) (Big Scary Monsters)
- Hollow Realm (2010) (Big Scary Monsters)
- New Topographics (2014) (Big Scary Monsters)
- We All Know (2018) (Holy Roar Records)

=== Singles ===
- "The Pearl Is So Upscale It Makes Dubai's Palm Look Like Milton Keynes" (2009)
- "Bethlehem" (split with "And So I Watch You From Afar") (2009)
- ""Anthropods" (split with Noumenon) (2010)
- "Trevelyan" (free download) (2010)

=== Compilation appearances ===
- Summer 09 BSM Compilation (2009) (Big Scary Monsters)
- One Beat: Best of 2010 (2010) (One Beat)
- Sixth Sixth Sixth: An ArcTanGent Compilation (2013) (Musical Mathematics)
