= Our First American Friends =

Studio album by Tubelord
- Released: October 12, 2009
- Recorded: December 2008 – February 2009
- Studio: The Pierce Rooms, Hammersmith and Livingston Studios, Wood Green, London, UK
- Genre: Alternative rock, math rock, indie pop
- Length: 40:49
- Label: Hassle
- Producer: Tristen Ivemy

Tubelord chronology
Our First American Friends (2009)	Tezcatlipōca (2010)

Professional ratings
Review scores
Source	Rating
Classic Rock	7/10 stars
Rock Sound	8/10

Our First American Friends is the debut album by British alternative rock band Tubelord. It was released on October 12, 2009, through Hassle Records. The album mostly features newly written material but also features re-recorded version of songs such as "Night of the Pencils" and "Propeller" which have been staples in the band's live set and have been released in limited edition singles prior to the recording of Our First American Friends.

The album has been released on compact disc, digital download and vinyl, which contain a free bonus disc titled One for the Grandparents that featured many of the album's songs which have been completely re-worked acoustically.

== Track listing ==
All tracks are written by Xoey Fourr and Tubelord

No.	Title	Length
1.	"Your Bed Is Kind of Frightening"	3:53
2.	"Somewhere Out There a Dog Is on Fire"	3:43
3.	"Night of the Pencils"	4:14
4.	"Stacey's Left Arm"	4:10
5.	"Propeller"	3:34
6.	"He Awoke on a Beach in Abergavenny"	4:16
7.	"I Am Azerrad"	3:31
8.	"Cows to the East, Cities to the West"	3:40
9.	"Synthesize"	4:13
10.	"Our First American Friends"	5:36
Total length:		40:49

Bonus track
No.	Title	Length
11.	"Half Man, Half Amazing"	4:19
Total length:		45:08

One for the Grandparents
No.	Title	Length
1.	"Stacey's Left Arm"	4:01
2.	"Somewhere Out There a Dog Is on Fire"	3:47
3.	"Night of the Pencils"	4:06
4.	"I Am Azerrad"	3:46
5.	"He Awoke on a Beach in Abergavenny"	2:21
6.	"Your Bed Is Kind of Frightening"	3:23
7.	"Our First American Friends"	4:47
8.	"Propeller"	4:48
9.	"Synthesize"	3:39
Total length:		49:15

== Personnel ==
Tubelord

- Xoey Fourr - guitars, lead vocals
- Sean Bamberger - bass guitar, backing vocals
- David Catmur - drums, violin, viola, synthesizer [Casio Vl-1], chimes, glockenspiel, backing vocals

Additional musicians

- Caroline Court - additional violin
- Rob Stanley-Smith - additional cello
- Alan Welsh, James Elliott Field - backing vocals

Production

- Tristan Ivemy - producer, engineer
- James Elliott Field, Darren Simpson - assistant engineers
- John Davis - mastering
