= The JCQ =

British rock band

- Also known as: The James Cleaver Quintet
- Origin: Eastbourne, United Kingdom
- Genres: Experimental rock, post-hardcore, punk rock, art punk
- Years active: 2006–2014
- Labels: Hassle Records, Tangled Talk
- Members: Jack Saunders, Maud E. Licious, Paul Ford, Martin Ruffin, Michael Triponel, Charlie Holter
- Past members: Nick Kinnish, Seb Stinson, Casey Denman, Jimmy Diego
- Website: Official website

The JCQ (previously known as The James Cleaver Quintet) were a British rock band from Eastbourne, United Kingdom. They were signed to Hassle Records. Described as a "mental breakdown set to music", the band released one EP and two full-length studio albums: Ten Stages of a Makeup in 2010, That Was Then, This Is Now and 2011 and Mechanical Young in 2013.

== History ==
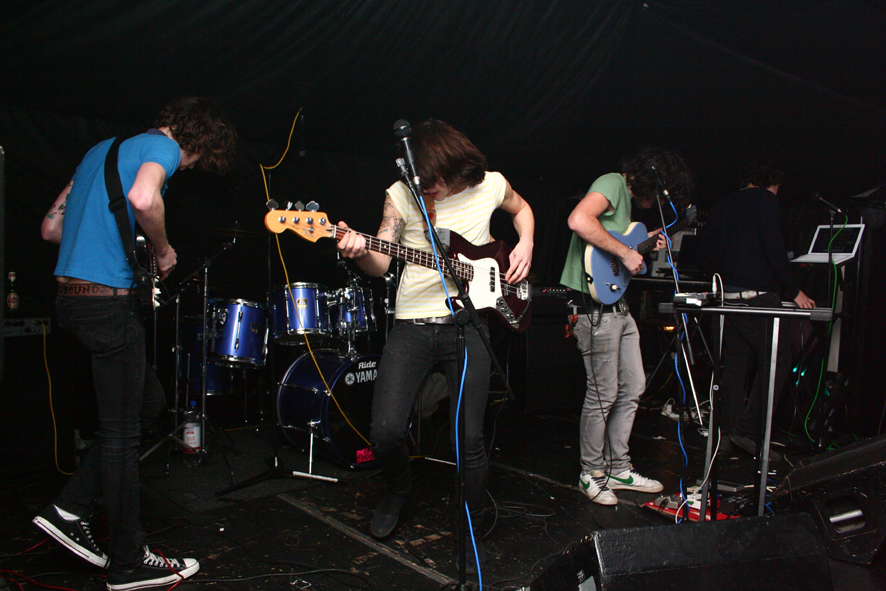
The JCQ in 2007

In March 2010 the band's debut extended play Ten Stages of a Make Up was released In August 2011 the band released the EP for free on the internet in preparation for their first album's release.

In January 2011 the band released the song "Chicken Shit (For The Soul)" as the first single off their debut album, That Was Then, This Is Now, which was proposed to be released in April. The band also completed a tour of the United Kingdom in February to support the release of the single. In August 2011 the band filmed a Lucozade advertisement, where the five members roll down with different vehicles performing a cover of Feeders' Buck Rogers.

On 31 October 2011, the band released their debut album That Was Then, This Is Now, which opened to reception from popular critics such as the BBC, Drowned in Sound, and Rock Sound. In promotion of the record the band supported Turbowolf with Hawk Eyes across the United Kingdom in November. Across the next year The JCQ supported Enter Shikari and Limp Bizkit and completed a co-headline tour with The Safety Fire.

On 17 June 2013, the band released their second studio album Mechanical Young. The album was recorded in Sweden with Pelle Henricsson and Eskil Lovstrom, live using vintage equipment, the band wished to record it live as they believed it captured the band's energy and argued that "there are mistakes left in and not everything sounds 100% perfect, but that's where the real sense of the band lies – in those mistakes". The album revived positive reception from British Publications like Big Cheese, Front Magazine, Rock Sound and This Is Fake DIY. Rock Sound writer Pete Withers in an eight out of ten review stated the album "is an absolute triumph in every regard". Terry Bezer when writing for Front in an otherwise positive review criticised the album saying: "sure, they could do with a little tightening and reigning it all in a bit from time to time but there’s an unbelievable amount of potential". For the promotion the band made a music video for Loves No Good.

== Musical style ==
The JCQ have been typically described as a "viciously imaginative hardcore band". Despite labelling their genre as "no thank you" The JCQ have been cited as post-hardcore, punk rock, art punk, garage punk, and mathcore and have been described as a "bizarre yet daring genre-splicing of hardcore, alternative and math-rock". The JCQ's typical style features thrash riffs, breakdowns, fast pace drumming, big choruses, rapid tempo changes, atmospheric breaks and "spastic" guitar work. However the band incorporates elements from other styles, including swing. Birmingham based math rock band Blakfish are seen as "spiritual forefathers" to the band.

Their debut album That Was Then, This Is Now has been considered 'strikingly angular' 'frenetic chaos'.

Mechanical Young, is seen as exploring the same areas as their first album, however is much more expansive and refined by using tenor saxophones, syncopated rhythms, keyboards, harsh riffs and an extended outro. The opening song 'Ghost Diffuse' has a doom metal-inspired guitar riff. Single 'Love's No Good' has been considered their most commercial song using a "funky and cool Red Hot Chili Peppers cum Fun Lovin' Criminals-esque" sing-along chorus. The three songs 'No Kind of Man Parts 1+2' and the piano based instrumental 'iii' which splits them up are considered the centrepiece of 'Mechanical Young'. Part 1 is similar to the frenetic hardcore punk of their first album, while Part 2 has a surf punk style.

== Members ==
- Jack – lead vocals
- Maud – guitar, tenor sax
- Michael – bass guitar
- Paul – drums, percussion
- Martin – keyboards, vocals

== Discography ==
Studio albums

- That Was Then, This Is Now (2011, Hassle)
- Mechanical Young (2013, Hassle)

Music videos

- "Chicken Shit (for the Soul)" (2010)
- "Think or Swim" (2012)
- "Love's No Good" (2013)
