= Fun Club =

EP by Gnarwolves
- Released: 16 July 2012 (UK)
- Genre: Punk rock, pop punk, skate punk
- Length: 18:25
- Label: Tangled Talk Records

Gnarwolves chronology
| Fun Club (2012) | CRU (2012) |

Professional ratings
Review scores
| Source | Rating |
|---|---|
| Punktastic | 4/5 stars |

Fun Club is the debut release by British punk rock band Gnarwolves. Released as a double EP on Tangled Talk Records, it features five original tracks, as well as four cover songs from Green Day, AFI, Black Flag and Converge.

== Track listing ==
All music is composed by Gnarwolves except where noted.

| No. | Title | Length |
|---|---|---|
| 1. | "Party Jams" | 1:48 |
| 2. | "Decay" | 2:15 |
| 3. | "No Time for Old Bones" | 1:32 |
| 4. | "Reaper" | 2:07 |
| 5. | "Chlorine in the Jean Pule" | 1:38 |
| 6. | "When Eagles Become Vultures" (Converge) | 1:57 |
| 7. | "Basket Case" (Green Day) | 2:25 |
| 8. | "Gimmie Gimmie Gimmie" (Black Flag) | 1:47 |
| 9. | "The Boy Who Destroyed the World" (AFI) | 2:35 |
| Total length: | | 18:25 |

== Personnel ==
Gnarwolves

- Thom Weeks - Vocals/Guitar
- Charlie Piper - Vocals/Bass
- Max Weeks - Drums

Production

- Wolfmask - Art
