= Mutiny on the Bounty (band) =

Luxembourgish band

Background information
- Origin: Esch-sur-Alzette, Luxembourg
- Genres: Math rock, indie Rock, post-Hardcore
- Years active: 2004-present
- Labels: New Romance For Kids Records, Redfield Records, Big Scary Monsters Records, Best Before Records, Deaf Rock Records, Small Pond Records
- Members: Sacha Hanlet ("Falcon"); Nicolas Przeor ("Pzey"); Clement Delporte ("Clem") (since 2011); Cedric Czaika ("Tchiggy") (since 2011)
- Past members: David Schmit (till 2007); Luciano Lippis ("Topolino") (till 2011); Claudio Pianini ("Pi") (till 2011)
- Website: www.motb.net

Mutiny on the Bounty (abbreviated MOTB) is a Luxembourgish alternative rock band from Esch-sur-Alzette.

== History ==
Mutiny on the Bounty was founded in April 2004 by Nicolas Prezor and Sacha Hanlet. Their first release was a split-album in 2005, with "Treasure-Chest at the End of the Rainbow" also a Luxembourg-based band, in which Sacha Hanlet was also active. At this time, the band consisted of David Schmit (guitarist of Eternal Tango), Luciano Lippis, and the two founding members. This split-album was licensed by the Canadian record-label New Romance for Kids, for Canada, United States, and Japan. In 2007, Moreira left the group and Claudio Pianini joined them as bassist.

Thereafter, Mutiny on the Bounty toured through Europe and shared the stage with bands like Battles, And so I watch you from afar, 65 Days of Static, Coheed and Cambria, These Arms are Snakes, Akimbo, Russian Circles, Portugal. The Man, Red Sparowes, 31 Knots, and Fear before the March of Flames.

Nevertheless, the band alongside continued to work on songs for their debut album. Each member of the band delivered a variety of song-fragments, which were then edited together. Thus arose songs that involve various influences, but can nonetheless be regarded as the work of a band. It took ten months until the songs were ready to record. After nearly two years of preparation, they finally went in the studio to record their debut album Danger Mouth with Philippe Matgé one of the best sound engineers throughout Luxembourg. The album was mastered in New York City in the West WestSide Studios by Alan Douches. Danger Mouth was published in 2009 by Redfield Records in Germany and Big Scary Monsters Records in England.

Other international concerts followed, inter alia a gig at the South by Southwest (SXSW) festival in Austin Texas.

In August 2011 Pianini and Lippis were replaced by Cedric Czaika and Clement Delporte. Also in 2011, they were seen in Govinda van Maeles “We might as well fail” documentation.

Mutiny on the Bounty's second album Trials was recorded within one month in Seattle in the Red Room Recording Studio of the well-known American producer Matt Bayles. The band sent Bayles a link with a few of their songs, and after a meeting in the context of their performance in Austin they had convinced him to record their new album. The band financed the production through crowdfunding. Trials was published 2011 by Redfield Records in Germany and Best before Records in England.

The release-party of Trials was on May 4, 2012 in Den Atelier in Luxembourg City. Mutiny on the Bounty were supported by the Luxembourgish bands Heartbeat Parade and Mount Stealth. In April, a music video for the single Artifacts was released, for the song Myanmar a music video was published in February 2013. In early 2014, another video for Mapping the Universe appeared.

The third album Digital Tropics was recorded with producer Jan Kerscher in the Ghost City Recording Studios near Nuremberg and was mixed by Jan Kerscher. The first single from this album is named MKL JKSN and was published with the corresponding music video on March 2. 2015 by Visions magazine in Germany and 7BitArcade in England. Telekinesis, the second single from the album was released exclusively on April 3. 2015 via the website of the Clash Magazine. The release show for their third album took place on April 17 in the Kufa in Esch-sur-Alzette. The album was released on the same day on CD, the LP followed on May 22, 2015 released by Redfield Records (DE) and Deaf Rock Records (FR). In the UK, Digital Tropics was released on May 26, 2015 on CD and LP by their new Record label Small Pond Records (UK).

The music video for the third single dance Automaton dance appeared on YouTube on June 17, 2015.

On July 17, 2015, Digital Tropics was released on the record-label Friend of mine Records in Japan. The Japanese version of the album appears as a Digi-sleeve with a new design, the bonus track Bleak Future, and a remix of the song Ecliptic which was remixed by Sun Glitters.

== Style ==
Mutiny on the Bounty plays a mix of Post-Hardcore (esp. on the first and most parts of the second record) and math/post-rock with synthetic- and electronic-sounding elements, their guitars sometimes sound more like a computer or a keyboard.

== Festivals ==
The band is known to play a lot of shows during the year. Next to being on the road, playing shows in Europe, the United States and Asia, Mutiny on the Bounty have played numerous festivals across Europe and the US:

- Eurosonic Noorderslag - Groningen (NL)
- Reeperbahn Festival - Hambourg (D)
- Primavera Festival - Barcelona (ESP)
- CMJ Music Week - New York (US)
- SXSW Festival - Austin, TX (US)
- Arctangent - Bristol (UK)
- The Great Escape Festival -Brighton (UK)
- Europavox Festival - (FR)
- Rock for People Festival - Hradec (CZ)
- Rock-a-Field Festival - Roeser (LUX)
- Food for your Senses Festival - Luxembourg (LUX)
- Les Jardins du Michel - Toul (FR)

and many more.

As up to January 2017, MOTB have played over 700 live-shows.

== Band members ==
Present

- Sacha Hanlet ("Falcon") - drums and lead vocals
- Nicolas Przeor ("Pzey") - guitar and backing vocals
- Clement Delporte ("Clem") (since 2011) - guitar
- Cedric Czaika ("Tchiggy") (since 2011) - bass and backing vocals

Past members

- David Schmit (till 2007) - bass
- Luciano Lippis ("Topolino") (till 2011) - guitar
- Claudio Pianini ("Pi") (till 2011) - bass and vocals

== Discography ==
Albums

- 2005: Treasure Chest at the End of the Rainbow / Mutiny on the Bounty (Split album with Treasure Chest at the End of the Rainbow, New Romance For Kids Records)
- 2009: Danger Mouth (Redfield Records / Big Scary Monsters Records)
- 2012: Trials (Redfield Records / Best Before Records)
- 2015: Digital Tropics (Redfield Records / Deaf Rock Records / Small Pond Records / Friend of Mine Records)

Singles

- 2012: Artifacts (Digitalsingle)
- 2013: Myanmar (Radiosingle)
- 2015: MKL JKSN (Digitalsingle)
- 2015: Telekinesis (Digitalsingle)
- 2015: dance Automaton dance (Digitalsingle)
