= Tubelord =

English alternative rock band

- Origin: Kingston upon Thames, Surrey, England
- Genres: Math rock, indie rock
- Years active: 2006–2012
- Labels: Hassle Records, Big Scary Monsters
- Past members: Xoey Fourr; David Catmur; Tom Coulson-Smith; James Elliot Field; Damien Fabien Gabet; Sean Bamberger; Olev Saunders
- Website: www.myspace.com/tubelord

Tubelord were an English alternative rock band, formed in 2006 in Kingston upon Thames, Surrey.

In 2009, the band signed a record deal with independent label Hassle Records and on 12 October 2009 they released their debut album Our First American Friends. The band split up in 2012.

== History ==
The band formed in 2005 while attending Kingston College by Xoey Fourr, David Catmur and Olev Saunders. Over the next three years Tubelord would release several EPs and singles as well as touring heavily around the United Kingdom and Europe with bands such as This Town Needs Guns and Tellison. After relentless touring Olev Saunders left the band and was replaced by Sean Bamberger.

They cited influences including Meet Me in St. Louis and Biffy Clyro.

In late 2009, Tubelord released their debut album Our First American Friends, which was met with critical praise from Rock Sound, DIY, and the BBC.

The band referred to American music journalist Michael Azerrad on their single "I Am Azerrad," which includes the line "I kill today, I'll kill you Azerrad," prompting Azerrad to contact them regarding the subject matter and write a humorous essay about the experience for Spin.

Following the critical success of Our First American Friends, the band added a fourth member, keyboardist James Elliot Field, to the line-up, with Tom Coulson-Smith replacing the departing Sean Bamberger on bass. The band continued their change in musical direction on their second album Romance which was released on Pink Mist in 2011. Tubelord announced in November 2012 that they would play a final show on New Year's Eve before splitting up.

The guitarist / vocalist now goes by Xoey Fourr (she/her) and has released multiple indie-pop records. David Catmur, the band's drummer, went on to become a tour manager, and is now a flight instructor.

On 24th March 2025, the band released Better than Romance, a collection of songs which hadn't made it onto previous records.

== Discography ==
=== Singles ===
- "Feed Me A Box of Words" – Big Scary Monsters (17 March 2008)
- "Night of the Pencils" – 2008 – Banquet Records
- "I Am Azerrad" – Big Scary Monsters (29 September 2008)
- "Propeller" – Hassle Records (28 September 2009)
- "Stacey's Left Arm" – 2010 – Hassle Records
- "4t3" – Pink Mist (1 June 2011)
- "My First Castle – Pink Mist" (14 September 2011)

=== EPs ===
- "Square EP" – Self-Released (20 April 2007)
- Tezcatlipōca – Hassle Records (16 August 2010)

=== Albums ===
- Our First American Friends – Hassle Records (12 October 2009)
- Romance – Pink Mist (10 October 2011)

=== Compilation albums ===
- One for the Grandparents – Self-Released (12 October 2009)
- Pop Songs for Rock Kids – Big Scary Monsters (29 November 2013)

=== Splits ===
- Split 7' w/ Tellison – 4 September 2008
