= Big Scary Monsters Recording Company =

English independent record label

Big Scary Monsters
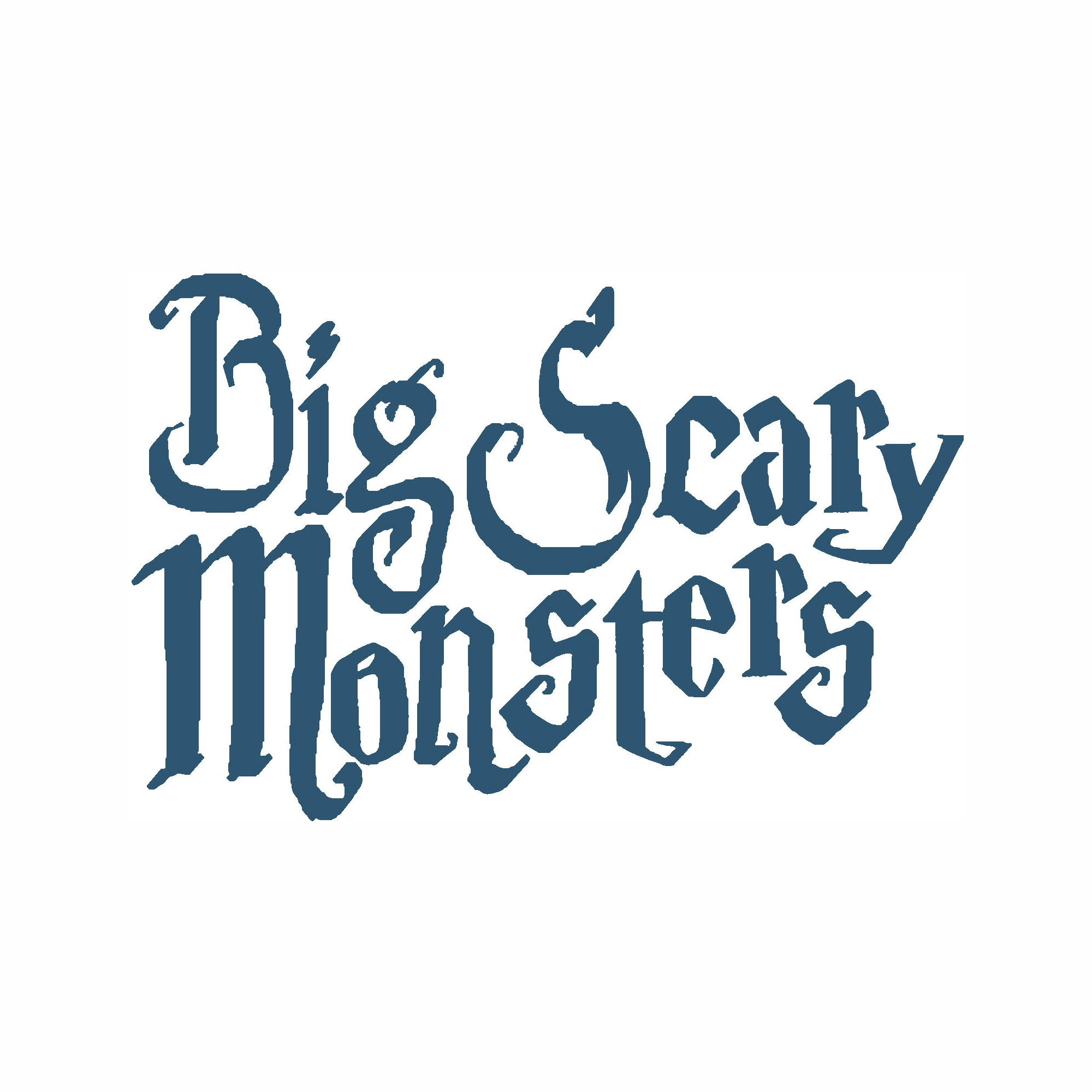
- The BSM 2019 logo
- Founded: 2001
- Founder: Kevin Douch
- Genre: Alternative rock; indie rock; punk rock; experimental rock; emo
- Location: Oxford, England
- Official website: bsmrocks.com

Big Scary Monsters Recording Company (often known simply as Big Scary Monsters or BSM Records) is an independent record label based in Oxford, England. It primarily releases punk and alternative rock, as well as related genres.

== History ==
Big Scary Monsters was established in 2001 by Kevin Douch, whilst aged 17 and attending sixth form.

In 2006 Douch launched a sister-label, Alcopop! Records, with Jack Clothier.

On 7 September 2010, the label celebrated its 100th release. The release was titled Partied Hard was a DVD/CD compilation featuring over thirty promo, live and bonus videos from the label's history. It was only available between 7 September (the day after BSM099 came out) and 24 October 2010 (the day before BSM101 was due out)

In 2010 BSM co-founded Pink Mist with fellow indie labels Holy Roar and Blood And Biscuits. Pink Mist is an East London-based collective releasing records and promoting regular live shows.

Kevin Douch was featured as a speaker at AIM's Indie Con event in 2017.

From 2007 to 2016 BSM hosted an annual five-a-side football tournament at Wembley Powerleague, with bands, labels, magazines, shops and other music industry teams competing.

== Pop-up stores ==
In December 2016 the label announced that they would be opening up a pop-up store in Hackney, London, from 23 January to 4 February 2017. This two-week period was eventually catalogued as BSM200 and was a celebration of the label's 16th birthday. During the pop up there were in-store performances from Modern Baseball, Kevin Devine, Gnarwolves, Delta Sleep, Tall Ships and more. There were also other non-music based events including, a-bring-your-dog day, a screen printing day with Awesome Merchandise, and a cocktail bar run by the band Tiny Moving Parts.

In March 2018, BSM announced that they would be opening their second pop-up store in Cardiff. The in-store featured performances from UK based signings Jamie Lenman, Orchards, Nervus, and US band Slaughter Beach, Dog.

In 2019, BSM continued its run of form and announced their pop-up store would be coming to Glasgow in Scotland. Over their time there the label hosted in store performances from We Were Promised Jetpacks and in store talks from prominent Scottish music figures. They hosted virtual pop-ups in 2020.

Since then, the label have gone on to open pop-up shops in Brighton, Cologne and Norwich, as well as a craft beer and record shop in Oxford called Big Scary Monsters Social Club, which was open from September 2020 until September 2023.

== Artists with releases on Big Scary Monsters ==
- American Football
- Andrew W.K.
- Beach Slang
- Blakfish
- Chris Farren
- Crash of Rhinos
- Cursive
- Doe
- Delta Sleep
- The Gloria Record
- Great Grandpa
- Gnarwolves
- Grown Ups
- Hell Is For Heroes
- Jamie Lenman
- Jeniferever
- Joyce Manor
- Kevin Devine
- La Dispute
- Lambrini Girls
- Meet Me in St. Louis
- ME REX
- Minus The Bear
- Modern Baseball
- Owen
- Pedro The Lion
- Prince Daddy & The Hyena
- Pool Kids
- Proper.
- Pulled Apart By Horses
- Remember Sports
- Richard Walters
- Shoes and Socks Off
- Slaughter Beach, Dog
- Tall Ships
- Talons
- Thin Lips
- This Town Needs Guns
- Toe
- Tubelord
- Vinnie Caruana
