= AFI discography =

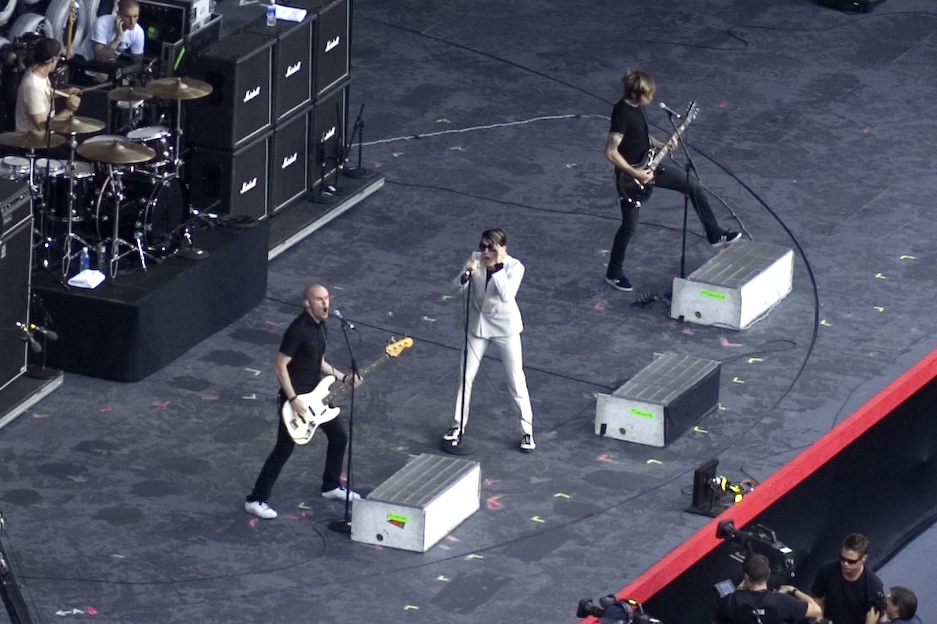
- AFI performing on the American leg of Live Earth in July 2007
- Studio albums: 12
- Extended plays: 12
- Live albums: 1
- Compilation albums: 1
- Singles: 29
- Video albums: 1
- Music videos: 24

The discography of American alternative rock band AFI consists of twelve studio albums, one live album, one compilation album, one video album, twelve extended plays, twenty-nine singles and twenty-four music videos.

== Albums ==
=== Studio albums ===
List of studio albums, with selected chart positions and certifications
Title	Album details	Peak chart positions										Certifications
Title	Album details	US	AUS	CAN	FRA	GER	IRL	JPN	NZ	SCO	UK	Certifications
Answer That and Stay Fashionable	Released: July 4, 1995; Label: Wingnut; Formats: CD, CS, LP, digital download	—	—	—	—	—	—	—	—	—	—	
Very Proud of Ya	Released: June 18, 1996 (US); Label: Nitro; Formats: CD, CS, LP, digital download	—	—	—	—	—	—	—	—	—	—	
Shut Your Mouth and Open Your Eyes	Released: November 11, 1997 (US); Label: Nitro; Formats: CD, CS, LP, digital download	—	—	—	—	—	—	—	—	—	—	
Black Sails in the Sunset	Released: May 18, 1999 (US); Label: Nitro; Formats: CD, CS, LP, digital download	—	—	—	—	—	—	—	—	—	—	
The Art of Drowning	Released: September 26, 2000; Label: Nitro; Formats: CD, LP, digital download	174	—	—	—	—	—	—	—	—	—	
Sing the Sorrow	Released: March 11, 2003 (US); Label: DreamWorks; Formats: CD, CS, LP, digital download	5	65	10	—	—	—	—	—	63	52	RIAA: Platinum; ARIA: Gold; MC: Platinum; BPI: Silver
Decemberunderground	Released: June 6, 2006 (US); Label: Interscope; Formats: CD, CS, LP, digital download	1	3	2	181	58	66	80	20	21	16	RIAA: Platinum; ARIA: Platinum; MC: Platinum; BPI: Silver
Crash Love	Released: September 29, 2009 (US); Label: Interscope; Formats: CD, LP, digital download	12	16	17	—	95	—	115	38	—	73	
Burials	Released: October 22, 2013 (US); Label: Republic; Formats: CD, LP, digital download	9	10	17	—	—	—	—	—	71	59	
AFI	Released: January 20, 2017 (US); Label: Concord; Formats: CD, LP, digital download	5	12	20	—	—	—	—	—	61	69	
Bodies	Released: June 11, 2021; Label: Rise; Formats: CD, LP, digital download	— (Note: Bodies did not enter the Billboard 200, but peaked at number 33 on the Top Album Sales chart.)	—	—	—	—	—	—	—	—	— (Note: Bodies did not enter the UK Albums Chart, but peaked at number 29 on the UK Album Downloads Chart.)	
Silver Bleeds the Black Sun...	Released: October 3, 2025 (US); Label: Run for Cover; Formats: CD, LP, digital download	110	57	—	—	—	—	—	—	67	—	
"—" denotes a recording that did not chart or was not released in that territory.

=== Live albums ===
List of live albums, with selected chart positions
Title	Album details	Peak chart positions	
Title	Album details	US	US Hard Rock
Eddie Picnic's All Wet	Released: March 18, 1994 (US); Label: Key Lime Pie; Formats: 7"	—	—
I Heard a Voice – Live from Long Beach Arena	Released: November 13, 2007 (US); Label: Interscope; Formats: CD, LP, digital download	133	16

=== Compilation albums ===
List of compilation albums, with selected chart positions
Title	Album details	Peak chart positions			
Title	Album details	US	AUS Hit.	UK Indie	UK Rock
AFI	Released: November 2, 2004 (US); Label: Nitro; Formats: CD, LP, digital download	88	17	24	21

=== Video albums ===
List of video albums, with selected chart positions
Title	Album details	Peak chart positions	
Title	Album details	US Video	AUS Video
I Heard a Voice	Released: December 12, 2006 (US); Label: Interscope; Formats: DVD	8	2

== Extended plays ==
List of extended plays, with selected chart positions and notes
Title	Details	Peak chart positions	
Title	Details	UK	UK Rock
Behind the Times E.P.	Released: June 11, 1993 (US); Label: Key Lime Pie; Formats: 7"	—	—
Fly in the Ointment	Released: March 31, 1995 (US); Label: Wedge; Formats: 7"	—	—
A Fire Inside EP	Released: August 14, 1998; Label: Adeline; Formats: CD, 7", digital download	—	26
All Hallow's E.P.	Released: October 5, 1999 (US); Label: Nitro; Formats: CD, 7", digital download	— (Note: "All Hallow's E.P." did not enter the UK Singles Chart, but peaked at number 19 on the UK Physical Singles Chart.)	—
The Days of the Phoenix E.P.	Released: April 30, 2001 (US); Label: Nitro; Formats: CD; 500 copies pressed	152	—
336	Released: December 2, 2002 (US); Label: DreamWorks; Formats: 10"	—	—
The Missing Man	Released: December 7, 2018; Label: Ex Noctem Nacimur; Formats: LP, digital download	— (Note: "The Missing Man" did not enter the UK Albums Chart, but peaked at number 97 on the UK Album Downloads Chart.)	—
"—" denotes a recording that did not chart or was not released in that territory.

=== Promos and splits ===
List of promos and splits
Title	Details
Dork / Stick Around (with Loose Change)	Released: March 3, 1993 (US); Label: Key Lime Pie; Formats: 7"; 210 copies pressed; 200 sold.
AFI / Heckle (with Heckle)	Released: 1995 (US); Label: Wingnut; Formats: 7"; 1,000 copies pressed; 50 unreleased.
Bombing the Bay! (with Swingin' Utters)	Released: 1995 (US); Label: Sessions; Formats: 7"; Re-released in 1997.
Black Sails EP	Released: April 27, 1999 (US); Label: Nitro; Formats: CD; 5,000 copies pressed.
AP EP	Released: 1999 (US); Label: Nitro; Formats: CD

== Singles ==
List of singles, with selected chart positions and certifications, showing year released and album name
Title	Year	Peak chart positions										Certifications	Album
Title	Year	US	US Alt.	US Rock	AUS	CAN	GER	SCO	UK	UK Rock	VEN	Certifications	Album
"Totalimmortal"	1999	—	—	—	—	—	—	—	—	—	—		All Hallow's E.P.
"The Days of the Phoenix"	2000	—	—	—	—	—	—	—	—	—	—		The Art of Drowning
"Wester"	2001	—	—	—	—	—	—	—	—	—	—		The Art of Drowning
"Girl's Not Grey"	2003	— (Note: "Girl's Not Grey" did not enter the Billboard Hot 100, but peaked at number 14 on the Bubbling Under Hot 100 Singles chart.)	7	— (Note: "Girl's Not Grey" did not enter the Hot Rock & Alternative Songs chart, but peaked at number 29 on the Active Rock chart.)	—	—	—	23	22	4	—		Sing the Sorrow
"The Leaving Song Pt. II"	2003	—	16	— (Note: "The Leaving Song Pt. II" did not enter the Hot Rock & Alternative Songs chart, but peaked at number 28 on the Active Rock chart.)	27	—	—	44	43	4	—		Sing the Sorrow
"Silver and Cold"	2003	—	7	— (Note: "Silver and Cold" did not enter the Hot Rock & Alternative Songs chart, but peaked at number 35 on the Active Rock chart.)	—	—	—	—	—	—	—		Sing the Sorrow
"Head Like a Hole"	2004	—	—	—	—	—	—	—	—	—	—		Grand Theft Auto: San Andreas soundtrack
"Rabbits Are Roadkill on Rt. 37"	2005	—	—	—	—	—	—	—	—	—	—		Myspace Records, Vol. 1
"Miss Murder"	2006	24	1	— (Note: "Miss Murder" did not enter the Hot Rock & Alternative Songs chart, but peaked at number 10 on the Active Rock chart.)	14	—	93	34	44	2	11	ARIA: Platinum; BPI: Silver	Decemberunderground
"Love Like Winter"	2006	68	4	—	44	—	—	50	76	3	—		Decemberunderground
"The Missing Frame"	2007	—	17	—	—	—	—	—	—	—	—		Decemberunderground
"Carcinogen Crush"	2007	—	—	—	—	81	—	—	—	—	—		Non-album single
"Medicate"	2009	—	7	16	—	—	—	—	— (Note: "Medicate" did not enter the UK Singles Chart, but peaked at number 19 on the UK Physical Singles Chart.)	35	—		Crash Love
"Beautiful Thieves"	2009	—	23	48	—	—	—	—	— (Note: "Beautiful Thieves" did not enter the UK Singles Chart, but peaked at number 40 on the UK Physical Singles Chart.)	—	—		Crash Love
"I Hope You Suffer"	2013	—	— (Note: "I Hope You Suffer" did not enter the Alternative Airplay chart, but peaked at number 22 on the Alternative Digital Song Sales chart.)	40	—	—	—	—	—	37	—		Burials
"17 Crimes"	2013	—	25	— (Note: "17 Crimes" did not enter the Rock Songs chart, but peaked at number 49 on the Rock Airplay chart.)	—	—	—	—	—	—	—		Burials
"A Deep Slow Panic"	2014	—	—	—	—	—	—	—	—	—	—		Burials
"Snow Cats"	2016	—	39	—	—	—	—	—	—	—	—		AFI
"White Offerings"	2016	—	—	—	—	—	—	—	—	—	—		AFI
"Hidden Knives"	2017	—	—	—	—	—	—	—	—	—	—		AFI
"Get Dark"	2018	—	—	—	—	—	—	—	—	—	—		The Missing Man
"Twisted Tongues" / "Escape from Los Angeles"	2021	—	— (Note: "Twisted Tongues" did not enter the Alternative Airplay chart, but peaked at number 12 on the Alternative Digital Song Sales chart.)	— (Note: "Twisted Tongues" did not enter the Hot Rock Songs chart, but peaked at number 14 on the Rock Digital Song Sales chart.)	—	—	—	—	—	—	—		Bodies
"Twisted Tongues" / "Escape from Los Angeles"	2021	—	— (Note: "Escape from Los Angeles" did not enter the Alternative Airplay chart, but peaked at number 19 on the Alternative Digital Song Sales chart.)	— (Note: "Escape from Los Angeles" did not enter the Hot Rock Songs chart, but peaked at number 19 on the Rock Digital Song Sales chart.)	—	—	—	—	—	—	—		Bodies
"Looking Tragic" / "Begging for Trouble"	2021	—	—	—	—	—	—	—	—	—	—		Bodies
"Far Too Near" / "Dulcería"	2021	—	—	—	—	—	—	—	—	—	—		Bodies
"Caught"	2021	—	—	—	—	—	—	—	—	—	—		Non-album single
"Behind the Clock"	2025	—	—	—	—	—	—	—	—	—	—		Silver Bleeds the Black Sun...
"Holy Visions"	2025	—	—	—	—	—	—	—	—	—	—		Silver Bleeds the Black Sun...
"Ash Speck in a Green Eye"	2025	—	—	—	—	—	—	—	—	—	—		Silver Bleeds the Black Sun...
"Voidward, I Bend Back"	2025	—	—	—	—	—	—	—	—	—	—		Silver Bleeds the Black Sun...
"—" denotes a recording that did not chart or was not released in that territory.

=== Promotional singles ===
Title	Year	Album
"Affliction"	2006	Decemberunderground
"Darling, I Want to Destroy You"	2009	Crash Love
"The Conductor"	2013	Burials
"Heart Stops"	2013	Burials
"Aurelia"	2017	AFI
"Tied to a Tree"	2021	Bodies

== Music videos ==
List of music videos, showing year released and director(s)
Title	Year	Director(s)
"He Who Laughs Last..."	1996	Darren Doane, Ken Daurio
"Third Season"	1997	Darren Doane, Ken Daurio
"Totalimmortal"	1999	Brent Waroniecki
"The Days of the Phoenix"	2000	Marc Webb
"Girl's Not Grey"	2003	David Slade
"The Leaving Song Pt. II"	2003	Marc Webb
"Silver and Cold"	2004	John Hillcoat
"Miss Murder"	2006	Marc Webb
"Love Like Winter"	2006	Marc Webb
"Medicate"	2009	Paul Minor
"Beautiful Thieves"	2010	Travis Kopach
"I Hope You Suffer"	2013	Brian and Brad Palmer
"17 Crimes"	2013	Matt Stawski
"White Offerings"	2016	Drew Krisch
"Snow Cats"	2016	Drew Krisch
"Aurelia"	2017	Adam Mason
"Hidden Knives"	2017	Adam Mason
"Get Dark"	2019	Unknown
"Looking Tragic"	2021	Adam Mason
"Dulcería"	2021	Adam Mason
"On Your Back"	2021	Unknown
"Tied To A Tree"	2021	Linda Strawberry
"Behind The Clock"	2025	Gilbert Trejo
"Holy Visions"	2025	Gilbert Trejo
"Voidward, I Bend Back"	2025	Muted Widows
"Nooneunderground"	2026	Jonah Bergman

== Other appearances ==
Year	Title	Label	Tracks
1993	Punk Pukin' Fuckin' Shit		"Love Is a Many Splendored Thing"
1993	System Failure Vol.1		"Ronny Was a Rebel" (Chaos UK cover)
1994	This Is Berkeley, Not West Bay	Zafion Records	"Love Is a Many Splendored Thing"
1995	Kickstart - Nov 95		"Crop Tub"
1996	Punk Nation Unification	Nefer Records	"Yürf Rendenmein", "I Wanna Get a Mohawk"
1996	Bacteria Sour Volume 1		"Fish Bowl"
1996	Go Ahead Punk... Make My Day	Nitro Records	"He Who Laughs Last...", "Wake-Up Call"
1997	Mary Jane's Not a Virgin Anymore	Wingnut Records	"Cruise Control", "Love Is a Many Splendored Thing"
1997	Godmoney	BMG/Gee Street Records	"Wake-Up Call"
1997	Punk Fiction	Wedge Records	"Whatever I Do" (Negative Approach cover)
1997	10 Years Later	Bossa Nova Records	"Charles Atlas"
1997	Cinema Beer Nuts	Hopeless Records	"He Who Laughs Last..."
1998	The Show	Theologian Records	"3 ½"
1998	Deep Thoughts	Nitro Records	"A Single Second", "Self Pity", "Love Is a Many Splendored Thing", "Perfect Fit"
1998	Vans "Off The Wall" Sampler	Vans Records	"Third Season"
1999	No Time to Kill	Checkmate Records	"Transference", "The Chicken Song" (hidden track)
1999	Short Music for Short People	Fat Wreck Chords	"Hearts Frozen Solid, Thawed Once More by the Spring of Rage, Despair, and Hopelessness"
1999	Cinema Beer Belly, Vol. 4	Hopeless Records	"Third Season"
1999	Punk You!	Shock Records	"Who Knew?"
2000	The Thought Remains The Same	Nitro Records	"A Single Second", "Self Pity", "Love Is a Many Splendored Thing", "Perfect Fit"
2000	The Way It Should Be	Sessions Records	"Values Here" (Dag Nasty cover)
2000	Punk Goes Metal	Fearless Records	"My Michelle" (Guns N' Roses cover)
2000	For Those Who Stand	Tear It Down Records	"The Last Kiss" (mislabeled as "Weathered Tome")
2001	The Cornerstone Player #016	Various	"The Days of the Phoenix"
2001	Rock Sound 35: Music With Attitude	Rock Sound Spain	"The Lost Souls"
2001	That Darn Punk	Kung Fu Records	"Dream of Waking"
2001	Warped Tour 2001 Tour Compilation	Side One Dummy	"A Winter's Tale"
2001	Moto XXX Volume 2	Quick Fix Records	"He Who Laughs Last..."
2001	Plea for Peace/Take Action	Sub City Records	"Who Knew?"
2001	Warped Tour 2001 Tour Compilation	Sub City Records	"Wester"
2001	Tony Hawk's Pro Skater 3	Warner Bros. Records	"The Boy Who Destroyed The World"
2001	The DreamWorks Cheat Sheet	DreamWorks Records	"Sacrifice Theory"
2002	Punkzilla	Nitro Records	"Dream of Waking", "Wester", "The Days of the Phoenix"
2002	Punk Chunks 2	Lameass Recordz	"Wester"
2002	MTV Road Rules	Roadrunner Records	"The Nephilim"
2003	NME Presents: Rock 'n' Roll Riot, Volume 2 - Down The Front!	New Musical Express	"The Days of the Phoenix"
2003	Kerrang! Hometaping, Volume 3 - Come Out and Play	Kerrang!	"Ever and a Day"
2003	The Cornerstone Player #039	Cornerstone Promotion	"Girl's Not Grey"
2003	Monitor This!	Self-released	"Girl's Not Grey"
2003	Kerrang! High Voltage	Kerrang!	"Girl's Not Grey"
2003	Cinema Beer Buddy, Vol. 5	Hopeless Records	"The Days of the Phoenix"
2003	SoundGear New Music		"Girl's Not Grey"
2003	Big Shiny Tunes 8	Warner Bros. Records	"Girl's Not Grey"
2003	Nu Rock Traxx Volume 105	ERG Music	"Silver and Cold"
2003	VISIONS: All Areas, Volume 39	Visions	"Bleed Black"
2003	99x Up Start Bands Volume 1	99X	"Bleed Black"
2004	Grand Theft Auto: San Andreas	Interscope Records	"Head Like a Hole" (Nine Inch Nails cover)
2004	99X Live X 9: Joyride	99X	"Silver and Cold"
2005	Nitro Records $1 Tour CD Vol. 1	Nitro Records	"A Story at Three"
2005	NME & Green Day Present: Generation Punk	New Musical Express	"The Days of the Phoenix"
2005	Music from the Cutting Edge Razor Vol. 11	Metal Hammer	"Prayer Position"
2005	MySpace Records Vol. 1	Interscope Records/MySpace Records	"Rabbits are Roadkill on Route 37"
2005	A Life Less Lived: The Gothic Box	Rhino Records	"The Hanging Garden" (The Cure cover)
2006	Big Shiny Tunes 11	EMI	"Miss Murder"
2006	VISIONS: All Areas, Volume 75	Visions	"Kill Caustic"
2007	Guitar Hero 3: Legends of Rock	EMI	"Miss Murder", "Carcinogen Crush"
2007	20 Years of Rage	Warner Music Australia	"Miss Murder"
2008	Rock Band 2	EMI	"Girl's Not Grey"
2008	NASCAR 09	EMI	Ether
2009	Guitar Hero 5	EMI	"Medicate", "Beautiful Thieves", "The Missing Frame", "Girl's Not Grey"
2009	Rock Band DLC	EMI	"Medicate", "Beautiful Thieves", "Love Like Winter", "End Transmission", "The Leaving Song Pt. II", "Miss Murder"
2009	Underworld: Rise of the Lycans	Lakeshore Records	"Miss Murder (VNV Nation Remix)"
2010	Guitar Hero: Warriors of Rock	EMI	"Dancing Through Sunday"
2013	The Mortal Instruments: City of Bones	Republic Records	"17 Crimes (LA Riots Remix)"
2021	Rock Band DLC	EMI	"Far Too Near"

== List of songs recorded by AFI ==
Song	Writer(s)	Album(s)	Year	Ref.
"...But Home Is Nowhere"	Adam Carson; Davey Havok; Hunter Burgan; Jade Puget	Sing the Sorrow	2003	
"100 Words"	Adam Carson; Davey Havok; Hunter Burgan; Jade Puget	Crash Love (bonus track)	2009	
"17 Crimes"	Davey Havok; Jade Puget	Burials	2013	
"3½"	Adam Carson; Davey Havok; Hunter Burgan; Markus Stopholese	A Fire Inside EP	1998	
"37mm"	Adam Carson; Davey Havok; Hunter Burgan; Jade Puget	Decemberunderground	2006	
"6 to 8"	Adam Carson; Davey Havok; Hunter Burgan; Jade Puget	The Art of Drowning	2000	
"Above the Bridge"	Davey Havok; Jade Puget	AFI	2017	
"Advances in Modern Technology"	Davey Havok; Geoff Kresge	AFI / Heckle; Very Proud of Ya (re-recorded)	1995; 1996	
"Affliction"	Adam Carson; Davey Havok; Hunter Burgan; Jade Puget	Decemberunderground	2006	
"Anxious"	Hunter Burgan; Adam Carson; David Havok; Jade Puget	Burials	2013	
"Aspirin Free"	Davey Havok; Markus Stopholese	AFI / Heckle; Very Proud of Ya (re-recorded)	1995; 1996	
"At a Glance"	Adam Carson; Davey Havok; Hunter Burgan; Jade Puget	Black Sails in the Sunset	1999	
"Aurelia"	Davey Havok; Jade Puget	AFI	2017	
"Back from the Flesh"	Davey Havok	Bodies	2021	
"Back Into the Sun"	Davey Havok; Jade Puget	The Missing Man	2018	
"Battled"	Adam Carson; Davey Havok; Hunter Burgan; Jade Puget	The Art of Drowning	2000	
"Beautiful Thieves"	Adam Carson; Davey Havok; Hunter Burgan; Jade Puget	Crash Love	2009	
"Begging for Trouble"	Davey Havok	Bodies	2021	
"Bleed Black"	Adam Carson; Davey Havok; Hunter Burgan; Jade Puget	Sing the Sorrow	2003	
"Born in the U.S. of A."		Behind the Times	1993	
"The Boy Who Destroyed the World"	Adam Carson; Davey Havok; Hunter Burgan; Jade Puget	All Hallow's E.P.	1999	
"Break Angels"	Davey Havok; Jade Puget	The Missing Man	2018	
"Breathing Towers to Heaven"	Adam Carson; Davey Havok; Hunter Burgan; Jade Puget	Crash Love (bonus track)	2009	
"Brownie Bottom Sundae"	Davey Havok; Geoff Kresge	Answer That and Stay Fashionable	1995	
"Carcinogen Crush"	Adam Carson; Davey Havok; Hunter Burgan; Jade Puget	"Carcinogen Crush"; Crash Love (bonus track)	2007; 2009	
"Catch a Hot One"	Adam Carson; Davey Havok; Hunter Burgan; Jade Puget	The Art of Drowning	2000	
"Cereal Wars"	Geoff Kresge	Behind the Times; Answer That and Stay Fashionable (re-recorded)	1993; 1995	
"Charles Atlas"	Davey Havok; Markus Stopholese	Very Proud of Ya	1996	
"The Checkered Demon"	Davey Havok; Geoff Kresge; Markus Stopholese	Answer That and Stay Fashionable	1995	
"The Chicken Song"		No Time to Kill	1999	
"Clove Smoke Catharsis"	Adam Carson; Davey Havok; Hunter Burgan; Jade Puget	Black Sails in the Sunset	1999	
"Coin Return"	Adam Carson; Davey Havok; Markus Stopholese	Shut Your Mouth and Open Your Eyes	1997	
"Cold Hands"	Adam Carson; Davey Havok; Hunter Burgan; Jade Puget	Crash Love	2009	
"The Conductor"	Davey Havok; Jade Puget	Burials	2013	
"Consult My Lover"	Davey Havok; Geoff Kresge	Very Proud of Ya	1996	
"Crop Tub"	Davey Havok; Markus Stopholese	Fly in the Ointment; Very Proud of Ya (re-recorded)	1995; 1996	
"Cruise Control"	Davey Havok; Geoff Kresge	Fly in the Ointment; Very Proud of Ya (re-recorded)	1995; 1996	
"Cult Status"	Davey Havok; Geoff Kresge	Very Proud of Ya	1996	
"Dancing Through Sunday"	Adam Carson; Davey Havok; Hunter Burgan; Jade Puget	Sing the Sorrow	2003	
"Dark Snow"	Davey Havok; Jade Puget	AFI	2017	
"Darling, I Want to Destroy You"	Adam Carson; Davey Havok; Hunter Burgan; Jade Puget	Crash Love	2009	
"The Days of the Phoenix"	Adam Carson; Davey Havok; Hunter Burgan; Jade Puget	The Art of Drowning	2000	
"Death of Seasons"	Adam Carson; Davey Havok; Hunter Burgan; Jade Puget	Sing the Sorrow	2003	
"Death of the Party"	Davey Havok	Bodies	2021	
"A Deep Slow Panic"	Davey Havok; Jade Puget	Burials	2013	
"Demonomania" (Misfits cover)	Glenn Danzig	A Fire Inside EP	1998	
"The Despair Factor"	Adam Carson; Davey Havok; Hunter Burgan; Jade Puget	The Art of Drowning	2000	
"The Devil Loves You"	Adam Carson; Davey Havok; Markus Stopholese	Shut Your Mouth and Open Your Eyes	1997	
"Don't Change" (INXS cover)	INXS	"Miss Murder"; Decemberunderground (bonus track)	2006	
"Don't Make Me Ill"	Davey Havok; Geoff Kresge	Answer That and Stay Fashionable	1995	
"Dream of Waking"	Adam Carson; Davey Havok; Hunter Burgan; Jade Puget	The Art of Drowning (vinyl only track)	2000	
"Dulcería"	Davey Havok	Bodies	2021	
"Dumb Kids"	Davey Havok; Jade Puget	AFI	2017	
"The Embrace"	Davey Havok; Jade Puget	Burials	2013	
"End Transmission"	Adam Carson; Davey Havok; Hunter Burgan; Jade Puget	Crash Love	2009	
"Endlessly, She Said"	Adam Carson; Davey Havok; Hunter Burgan; Jade Puget	Decemberunderground	2006	
"Escape from Los Angeles"	Davey Havok	Bodies	2021	
"Ether"	Adam Carson; Davey Havok; Hunter Burgan; Jade Puget	Crash Love (bonus track)	2009	
"Ever and a Day"	Adam Carson; Davey Havok; Hunter Burgan; Jade Puget	The Art of Drowning	2000	
"Exsanguination"	Adam Carson; Davey Havok; Hunter Burgan; Jade Puget	Black Sails in the Sunset	1999	
"The Face Beneath the Waves"	Davey Havok; Jade Puget	Burials	2013	
"Fainting Spells"	Adam Carson; Davey Havok; Hunter Burgan; Jade Puget	Crash Love (bonus track)	2009	
"Fall Children"	Adam Carson; Davey Havok; Hunter Burgan; Jade Puget	All Hallow's E.P.	1999	
"Fallen Like the Sky"	Adam Carson; Davey Havok; Hunter Burgan; Jade Puget	Decemberunderground (bonus track)	2006	
"Far Too Near"	Davey Havok	Bodies	2021	
"Feed From the Floor"	Davey Havok; Jade Puget	AFI	2017	
"File 13"	Davey Havok; Geoff Kresge	Very Proud of Ya	1996	
"Fishbowl"	Davey Havok; Geoff Kresge	Very Proud of Ya	1996	
"Get Dark"	Davey Havok; Jade Puget	The Missing Man	2018	
"Get Hurt"	Davey Havok; Jade Puget	AFI	2017	
"Girl's Not Grey"	Adam Carson; Davey Havok; Hunter Burgan; Jade Puget	Sing the Sorrow	2003	
"God Called in Sick Today"	Adam Carson; Davey Havok; Hunter Burgan; Jade Puget	Black Sails in the Sunset	1999	
"The Great Disappointment"	Adam Carson; Davey Havok; Hunter Burgan; Jade Puget	Sing the Sorrow	2003	
"Greater Than 84"	Davey Havok; Jade Puget	Burials	2013	
"Half-Empty Bottle"	Geoff Kresge	Answer That and Stay Fashionable	1995	
"Halloween" (Misfits cover)	Glenn Danzig	All Hallow's E.P.	1999	
"The Hanging Garden" (The Cure cover)	Robert Smith; Lol Tolhurst; Simon Gallup	A Fire Inside EP	1998	
"Head Like a Hole" (Nine Inch Nails cover)	Trent Reznor	Grand Theft Auto: San Andreas Official Soundtrack; Decemberunderground (bonus track)	2004	
"Hearts Frozen Solid, Thawed Once More by the Spring of Rage, Despair, and Hopelessness"		Short Music for Short People	1999	
"He Who Laughs Last..."	Davey Havok; Geoff Kresge	Very Proud of Ya	1996	
"Heart Stops"	Davey Havok; Jade Puget	Burials	2013	
"Hidden Knives"	Davey Havok; Jade Puget	AFI	2017	
"High School Football Hero"	Geoff Kresge	Behind the Times; Answer That and Stay Fashionable (re-recorded)	1993; 1995	
"I Am Trying Very Hard to Be Here"	Adam Carson; Davey Havok; Hunter Burgan; Jade Puget	Crash Love	2009	
"I Hope You Suffer"	Davey Havok; Jade Puget	Burials	2013	
"I Wanna Get a Mohawk (But Mom Won't Let Me Get One)"	Davey Havok; Geoff Kresge	Eddie Picnic's All Wet (live); Answer That and Stay Fashionable	1994; 1995	
"Initiation"	Adam Carson; Davey Havok; Hunter Burgan; Jade Puget	The Art of Drowning	2000	
"The Interview"	Adam Carson; Davey Havok; Hunter Burgan; Jade Puget	Decemberunderground	2006	
"It Was Mine"	Adam Carson; Davey Havok; Hunter Burgan; Jade Puget	Crash Love	2009	
"Jack the Ripper" (Morrissey cover)	Boz Boorer; Morrissey	Decemberunderground (bonus track)	2006	
"Keeping Out Of Direct Sunlight (An Introduction)"	Adam Carson; Davey Havok; Markus Stopholese	Shut Your Mouth and Open Your Eyes	1997	
"Key Lime Pie"	Adam Carson	Answer That and Stay Fashionable	1995	
"Kill Caustic"	Adam Carson; Davey Havok; Hunter Burgan; Jade Puget	Decemberunderground	2006	
"The Killing Lights"	Adam Carson; Davey Havok; Hunter Burgan; Jade Puget	Decemberunderground	2006	
"Kiss and Control"	Adam Carson; Davey Havok; Hunter Burgan; Jade Puget	Decemberunderground	2006	
"Kung-Fu Devil"	Davey Havok; Markus Stopholese	Answer That and Stay Fashionable	1995	
"Last Caress" (Misfits cover)	Glenn Danzig	Shut Your Mouth and Open Your Eyes (vinyl bonus track)	1997	
"The Last Kiss"	Adam Carson; Davey Havok; Hunter Burgan; Jade Puget	Black Sails in the Sunset	1999	
"The Leaving Song"	Adam Carson; Davey Havok; Hunter Burgan; Jade Puget	Sing the Sorrow	2003	
"The Leaving Song Pt. II"	Adam Carson; Davey Havok; Hunter Burgan; Jade Puget	Sing the Sorrow	2003	
"Let It Be Broke"	Adam Carson; Davey Havok; Markus Stopholese	Shut Your Mouth and Open Your Eyes	1997	
"Looking Tragic"	Davey Havok	Bodies	2021	
"The Lost Souls"	Adam Carson; Davey Havok; Hunter Burgan; Jade Puget	The Art of Drowning	2000	
"Love is a Many-Splendored Thing"	Geoff Kresge	Eddie Picnic's All Wet (live); This Is Berkeley, Not West Bay; Very Proud of Ya (re-recorded, vinyl bonus track)	1994; 1996	
"Love Like Winter"	Adam Carson; Davey Havok; Hunter Burgan; Jade Puget	Decemberunderground	2006	
"Lower It"	Adam Carson; Davey Havok; Hunter Burgan; Jade Puget	Black Sails in the Sunset (vinyl only)	1999	
"Lower Your Head and Take It in the Body"	Adam Carson; Davey Havok; Markus Stopholese	Shut Your Mouth and Open Your Eyes	1997	
"Malleus Maleficarum"	Adam Carson; Davey Havok; Hunter Burgan; Jade Puget	Black Sails EP; Black Sails in the Sunset	1999	
"Man in a Suitcase" (The Police cover)	Sting	Answer That and Stay Fashionable	1995	
"Medicate"	Adam Carson; Davey Havok; Hunter Burgan; Jade Puget	Crash Love	2009	
"Midnight Sun"	Adam Carson; Davey Havok; Hunter Burgan; Jade Puget	Black Sails in the Sunset	1999	
"Mini Trucks Suck"		Dork (2017 re-issue)	2017	
"Miseria Cantare- The Beginning"	Adam Carson; Davey Havok; Hunter Burgan; Jade Puget	Sing the Sorrow	2003	
"Miss Murder"	Adam Carson; Davey Havok; Hunter Burgan; Jade Puget	Decemberunderground	2006	
"The Missing Frame"	Adam Carson; Davey Havok; Hunter Burgan; Jade Puget	Decemberunderground	2006	
"The Missing Man"	Davey Havok; Jade Puget	The Missing Man	2018	
"Modern Epic"	Davey Havok; Geoff Kresge	Very Proud of Ya	1996	
"Morningstar"	Adam Carson; Davey Havok; Hunter Burgan; Jade Puget	The Art of Drowning	2000	
"The Mother in Me"	Davey Havok; Geoff Kresge	Answer That and Stay Fashionable	1995	
"My Michelle" (Guns N' Roses cover)	Guns N' Roses	Punk Goes Metal	2000	
"Narrative of Soul Against Soul"	Adam Carson; Davey Havok; Hunter Burgan; Jade Puget	Black Sails in the Sunset	1999	
"The Nephilim"	Adam Carson; Davey Havok; Hunter Burgan; Jade Puget	The Art of Drowning	2000	
"The New Patron Saints and Angels"	Adam Carson; Davey Havok; Markus Stopholese	Shut Your Mouth and Open Your Eyes	1997	
"No-Dave Party"		Very Proud of Ya (pregap track)	1996	
"No Eyes"	Davey Havok	Bodies	2021	
"No Poetic Device"	Adam Carson; Davey Havok; Hunter Burgan; Jade Puget	Black Sails in the Sunset	1999	
"No Resurrection"	Davey Havok; Jade Puget	Burials	2013	
"Now the World"	Adam Carson; Davey Havok; Hunter Burgan; Jade Puget	336; Sing the Sorrow (re-recorded)	2002; 2003	
"Ny-Quil"	Davey Havok; Markus Stopholese	Dork; Eddie Picnic's All Wet (live); Answer That and Stay Fashionable (re-recorded)	1993; 1994; 1995	
"Of Greetings and Goodbyes"	Adam Carson; Davey Havok; Hunter Burgan; Jade Puget	The Art of Drowning	2000	
"Okay, I Feel Better Now"	Adam Carson; Davey Havok; Hunter Burgan; Jade Puget	Crash Love	2009	
"On the Arrow"	Adam Carson; Davey Havok; Hunter Burgan; Jade Puget	Decemberunderground (bonus track)	2006	
"On Your Back"	Davey Havok	Bodies	2021	
"Open Your Eyes" (The Circus Tents cover)	Matt Wedgley	Fly in the Ointment; Answer That and Stay Fashionable (re-release, re-recorded)	1995; 1997	
"Over Exposure"	Adam Carson; Davey Havok; Hunter Burgan; Markus Stopholese	A Fire Inside EP	1998	
"Paper Airplanes (Makeshift Wings)"	Adam Carson; Davey Havok; Hunter Burgan; Jade Puget	Sing the Sorrow	2003	
"Perfect Fit"	Davey Havok; Markus Stopholese	Very Proud of Ya	1996	
"pH Low"	Adam Carson; Davey Havok; Markus Stopholese	Shut Your Mouth and Open Your Eyes	1997	
"Pink Eyes"	Davey Havok; Jade Puget	AFI	2017	
"Porphyria Cutanea Tarda"	Adam Carson; Davey Havok; Hunter Burgan; Jade Puget	Black Sails EP; Black Sails in the Sunset	1999	
"The Prayer Position"	Adam Carson; Davey Havok; Hunter Burgan; Jade Puget	Black Sails EP; Black Sails in the Sunset	1999	
"Prelude 12/21"	Adam Carson; Davey Havok; Hunter Burgan; Jade Puget	Decemberunderground	2006	
"Rabbits are Roadkill on Rt. 37"	Adam Carson; Davey Havok; Hunter Burgan; Jade Puget	MySpace Records Volume 1 Decemberunderground (bonus track)	2005; 2006	
"Red Hat"		Dork	1993	
"Reivers' Music"	Adam Carson; Davey Havok; Hunter Burgan; Jade Puget	336	2002	
"Rewind"	Davey Havok; Jade Puget	Burials	2013	
"Rizzo in the Box"	Adam Carson; Davey Havok; Geoff Kresge	Behind the Times; Eddie Picnic's All Wet (live); Answer That and Stay Fashionable (re-recorded)	1993; 1994; 1995	
"Rolling Balls"	Davey Havok; Markus Stopholese	Behind the Times; Very Proud of Ya (re-recorded, vinyl bonus track)	1993; 1996	
"Sacrifice Theory"	Adam Carson; Davey Havok; Hunter Burgan; Jade Puget	The Art of Drowning	2000	
"Sacrilege"	Adam Carson; Davey Havok; Hunter Burgan; Jade Puget	Crash Love	2009	
"Salt for Your Wounds"	Adam Carson; Davey Havok; Markus Stopholese	Shut Your Mouth and Open Your Eyes	1997	
"Self-Pity"	Davey Havok; Markus Stopholese	Dork; Answer That and Stay Fashionable (re-recorded, vinyl-only track)	1993; 1995	
"Shatty Fatmas"	Davey Havok; Geoff Kresge	Very Proud of Ya	1996	
"She Speaks the Language"	Davey Havok; Jade Puget	AFI	2017	
"Silver and Cold"	Adam Carson; Davey Havok; Hunter Burgan; Jade Puget	Sing the Sorrow	2003	
"A Single Second"	Adam Carson; Davey Havok; Markus Stopholese	Shut Your Mouth and Open Your Eyes	1997	
"The Sinking Night"	Davey Havok; Jade Puget	Burials	2013	
"Smile"	Adam Carson; Davey Havok; Hunter Burgan; Jade Puget	The Art of Drowning	2000	
"Snow Cats"	Davey Havok; Jade Puget	AFI	2017	
"Soap-Box Derby"	Davey Havok; Markus Stopholese	Very Proud of Ya	1996	
"So Beneath You"	Davey Havok; Jade Puget	AFI	2017	
"Still a Stranger"	Davey Havok; Jade Puget	AFI	2017	
"A Story at Three"	Adam Carson; Davey Havok; Hunter Burgan; Jade Puget	The Art of Drowning'	2000	
"Strength Through Wounding"	Adam Carson; Davey Havok; Hunter Burgan; Jade Puget	Black Sails in the Sunset	1999	
"Summer Shudder"	Adam Carson; Davey Havok; Hunter Burgan; Jade Puget	Decemberunderground	2006	
"Synesthesia"	Adam Carson; Davey Havok; Hunter Burgan; Jade Puget	Sing the Sorrow (bonus track)	2003	
"Take the Test"	Davey Havok; Geoff Kresge	Very Proud of Ya	1996	
"Theory of Revolution"	Davey Havok; Geoff Kresge	Fly in the Ointment; Very Proud of Ya (re-recorded)	1995; 1996	
"Third Season"	Adam Carson; Davey Havok; Markus Stopholese	Shut Your Mouth and Open Your Eyes	1997	
"This Celluloid Dream"	Adam Carson; Davey Havok; Hunter Burgan; Jade Puget	Sing the Sorrow	2003	
"This Secret Ninja"	Davey Havok; Geoff Kresge	Very Proud of Ya	1996	
"This Time Imperfect"	Adam Carson; Davey Havok; Hunter Burgan; Jade Puget	Sing the Sorrow (hidden track)	2006	
"Three Reasons"	Adam Carson; Davey Havok; Markus Stopholese	Shut Your Mouth and Open Your Eyes	1997	
"Three Seconds Notice"	Adam Carson; Davey Havok; Markus Stopholese	Shut Your Mouth and Open Your Eyes	1997	
"Tied to a Tree"	Davey Havok	Bodies	2021	
"Today's Lesson" (Filth cover)	Filth	Shut Your Mouth and Open Your Eyes	1997	
"Too Late for Gods"	Adam Carson; Davey Havok; Hunter Burgan; Jade Puget	Crash Love (bonus track)	2009	
"Too Shy to Scream"	Adam Carson; Davey Havok; Hunter Burgan; Jade Puget	Crash Love	2009	
"Torch Song"	Adam Carson; Davey Havok; Hunter Burgan; Jade Puget	Crash Love	2009	
"Totalimmortal"	Adam Carson; Davey Havok; Hunter Burgan; Jade Puget	All Hallow's E.P.	1999	
"Transference"		No Time to Kill	1999	
"Trash Bat"	Davey Havok; Jade Puget	The Missing Man	2018	
"Triple Zero"	Adam Carson; Davey Havok; Markus Stopholese	Shut Your Mouth and Open Your Eyes	1997	
"Twisted Tongues"	Davey Havok	Bodies	2021	
"Two of a Kind"	Davey Havok; Geoff Kresge	Answer That and Stay Fashionable; Very Proud of Ya (re-recorded)	1995; 1996	
"Values Here" (Dag Nasty cover)	Dag Nasty	Bombing the Bay!	1995	
"Veronica Sawyer Smokes"	Adam Carson; Davey Havok; Hunter Burgan; Jade Puget	Crash Love	2009	
"The View from Here"	Adam Carson; Davey Havok; Hunter Burgan; Jade Puget	from the Decemberunderground sessions, never released		
"Wake-Up Call"	Davey Havok; Markus Stopholese	Very Proud of Ya	1996	
"Weathered Tome"	Adam Carson; Davey Havok; Hunter Burgan; Jade Puget	Black Sails in the Sunset	1999	
"Wester"	Adam Carson; Davey Havok; Hunter Burgan; Jade Puget	The Art of Drowning	2000	
"We've Got the Knife"	Adam Carson; Davey Havok; Hunter Burgan; Jade Puget	Crash Love (bonus track)	2009	
"Whatever I Do" (Negative Approach cover)	Negative Approach	Punk Fiction	1997	
"Where We Used to Play"	Adam Carson; Davey Havok; Hunter Burgan; Jade Puget	Crash Love (bonus track)	2009	
"White Offerings"	Davey Havok; Jade Puget	AFI	2017	
"Who Knew?"	Adam Carson; Davey Havok; Hunter Burgan; Jade Puget	Black Sails EP	1999	
"Who Said You Could Touch Me?"	Davey Havok; Geoff Kresge	Behind the Times; Eddie Picnic's All Wet (live); Very Proud of Ya (re-recorded, vinyl bonus track)	1993; 1994; 1996	
"Wild"	Davey Havok; Jade Puget	Burials	2013	
"The Wind That Carries Me Away"	Davey Havok; Jade Puget	AFI	2017	
"A Winter's Tale"	Adam Carson; Davey Havok; Hunter Burgan; Jade Puget	The Days of the Phoenix E.P.	2001	
"Your Name Here"	Geoff Kresge	Answer That and Stay Fashionable	1995	
"Yürf Rendenmein"	Davey Havok; Geoff Kresge	Answer That and Stay Fashionable; Very Proud of Ya (re-recorded)	1995; 1996	
