= AFI (2004 album) =

Compilation album by AFI
- Released: November 2, 2004
- Recorded: 1995–2000
- Genre: Hardcore punk
- Length: 38:27
- Label: Nitro
- Producer: AFI; Chuck Johnson; Michael Rosen

AFI chronology
Sing the Sorrow (2003)	AFI (2004)	Decemberunderground (2006)

AFI is an album by the American rock band AFI, compiling tracks from their releases on Nitro Records between 1996 and 2001, before the band signed to DreamWorks Records and achieved mainstream success. Released on November 2, 2004, the compilation peaked at #88 on the Billboard 200. The compilation focuses on the band's hardcore punk sound during this era.

The album's tracks are presented in reverse chronological order from their Nitro Records release dates, beginning with material from The Art of Drowning (2000) and proceeding through the All Hallow's E.P. (1999), Black Sails in the Sunset (1999), Shut Your Mouth and Open Your Eyes (1997), Very Proud of Ya (1996), and Answer That and Stay Fashionable (originally released in 1995 on Wingnut Records, re-released by Nitro in 1997). It includes the Art of Drowning B-side "A Winter's Tale", previously released on The Days of the Phoenix E.P. (2001), as well as three tracks previously exclusive to the LP releases of the band's albums: "Lower It" is from the LP release of Black Sails in the Sunset, while "Rolling Balls" and "Who Said You Could Touch Me?" are from the LP release of Very Proud of Ya.

== Background ==
The album is the last major Nitro Records release of AFI material recorded before their DreamWorks Records debut, Sing the Sorrow. According to Discogs, the album was "Allegedly released by Nitro Records without AFI's permission". A month before its release, the band posted on their official message board:

While we're really proud of our history and accomplishments we feel our career is really just getting started and feel slightly embarrassed by anything that hints at retrospect. There's plenty of time for that later when we're old. We'd rather move forward....

== Track listing ==
No.	Title	Writer(s)	Original release (Year)	Length
1.	"The Lost Souls"	Davey Havok, Jade Puget, Hunter Burgan, Adam Carson	The Art of Drowning (2000)	2:42
2.	"The Days of the Phoenix"	Havok, Puget, Burgan, Carson	The Art of Drowning (2000)	3:27
3.	"A Winter's Tale"	Havok, Puget, Burgan, Carson	The Days of the Phoenix E.P. (2001)	3:24
4.	"Totalimmortal"	Havok, Puget, Burgan, Carson	All Hallow's E.P. (1999)	2:44
5.	"Fall Children"	Havok, Puget, Burgan, Carson	All Hallow's E.P. (1999)	3:12
6.	"The Prayer Position"	Havok, Puget, Burgan, Carson	Black Sails in the Sunset (1999)	3:28
7.	"God Called in Sick Today"	Havok, Puget, Burgan, Carson	Black Sails in the Sunset (1999)	3:22
8.	"Lower It"	Havok, Puget, Burgan, Carson	Black Sails in the Sunset (1999)	2:18
9.	"A Single Second"	Havok, Carson, Mark Stopholese	Shut Your Mouth and Open Your Eyes (1997)	2:11
10.	"Third Season"	Havok, Stopholese, Carson	Shut Your Mouth and Open Your Eyes (1997)	2:49
11.	"He Who Laughs Last..."	Havok, Geoff Kresge	Very Proud of Ya (1996)	1:49
12.	"I Wanna Get a Mohawk (But Mom Won't Let Me Get One)"	Havok, Kresge	Answer That and Stay Fashionable (1995)	1:12
13.	"Perfect Fit"	Havok, Stopholese	Very Proud of Ya (1996)	1:58
14.	"Rolling Balls"	Havok, Stopholese	Very Proud of Ya (1996)	2:21
15.	"Who Said You Could Touch Me?"	Havok, Kresge	Very Proud of Ya (1996)	1:24
Total length:				38:27

== Reception ==
Professional ratings
Review scores
Source	Rating
Allmusic	3/5 stars
Punk News	3/5 stars

According to a PunkNews.org review, the album is "Purely intended as a proper introduction to fans first associated with AFI from their 2003 major label debut full-length, Sing the Sorrow" which functions as "a nice sampler of material ... of the band's back catalog."

=== Chart positions ===
Chart (2004)	Peak position
US Independent Albums (Billboard)	4
US Billboard 200	88
