= The Days of the Phoenix =

2000 song by AFI

Single by AFI

from the album The Art of Drowning
- Released: 2000
- Genre: Melodic hardcore; punk rock
- Length: 3:27
- Label: Nitro
- Composer: AFI
- Lyricist: Davey Havok
- Producers: AFI; Chuck Johnson

AFI singles chronology
"Totalimmortal" (1999)	"The Days of the Phoenix" (2000)	"Girl's Not Grey" (2003)

"The Days of the Phoenix" is a song by the American rock band AFI. It was released to radio as the only single from their fifth studio album The Art of Drowning in 2000. On the album's track listing, the song's title is written as "Days of the Phoenix".

== Background ==
According to Alternative Press, AFI "used to play at a venue in Petaluma, California, called the Phoenix Theater, and the track serves as a nod to their roots and early beginnings as a band."

== Music video ==
A music video directed by Marc Webb was shot in 14 Below, a music venue located in Santa Monica, California.

It features the band performing on stage in front of an excited audience. During the song's bridge, multiple versions of vocalist Davey Havok are seen quoting the bridge's lyrics, one by one.

== Track listing ==
All lyrics are written by Davey Havok; all music is composed by AFI (Havok, Adam Carson, Hunter Burgan, Jade Puget).

U.S. promotional single
No.	Title	Length
1.	"The Days of the Phoenix"	3:27

== Personnel ==
Credits adapted from liner notes.

- AFI – producer
- Chuck Johnson – producer
- Andy Ernst – mixing
- Jerry Finn – remix

== The Days of the Phoenix E.P. ==
The Days of the Phoenix E.P.

EP by AFI
- Released: May 14, 2001
- Length: 9:53
- Label: Nitro
- Producer: AFI; Chuck Johnson

AFI chronology
The Art of Drowning (2000)	The Days of the Phoenix E.P. (2001)	336 EP (2002)

An EP for the single was released on May 14, 2001, through Nitro Records. In addition to the title track, it contains "Wester" from The Art of Drowning, as well "A Winter's Tale", a b-side recorded during that album's sessions. Only 500 copies of the EP were pressed.

=== Track listing ===
All lyrics are written by Davey Havok; all music is composed by AFI (Havok, Adam Carson, Hunter Burgan, Jade Puget).

No.	Title	Length
1.	"The Days of the Phoenix"	3:27
2.	"A Winter's Tale"	3:25
3.	"Wester"	3:01

=== Personnel ===
Credits adapted from liner notes.

- AFI – producer
- Michael Anderson – assistant engineer
- Adam Carson – drums
- Andy Ernst – mixing
- Alan Forbes – artwork
- Davey Havok – vocals
- Hunter Burgan – bass
- Chuck Johnson – producer, engineer
- Thad LaRue – mixing assistant
- Chris Nitro – layout
- Jade Puget – guitar
- Nick 13 – guitar
- Frank Rinella – assistant engineer
- Eddy Schreyer – mastering

Studios

- Engineered at Fantasy Studios, Berkeley, CA
- Mixed at The Art of Ears, Hayward, CA
- Mastered at Oasis Mastering, Studio City, CA

== Charts ==
Chart (2001)	Peak position
UK Singles (Official Charts Company)	152
