= Eddie Picnic's All Wet =

Live album by AFI
- Released: March 18, 1994
- Recorded: December 29, 1993
- Venue: The Phoenix Theater (Petaluma, Calif.)
- Genre: Hardcore punk
- Length: 8:24
- Label: Key Lime Pie

AFI chronology
Behind the Times E.P. (1993)	Eddie Picnic's All Wet (1994)	This Is Berkeley, Not West Bay (1994)

Eddie Picnic's All Wet is a live EP by American rock band AFI. It was recorded on December 29, 1993, during a show at The Phoenix Theater in Petaluma, California, and released on March 18, 1994, through Key Lime Pie Records. 201 copies were produced on pink vinyl for its first pressing. The second pressing was limited to 100. A reissue, featuring slightly different artwork and remastered tracks, was announced in 2015 and released in 2016 after a pressing delay. The reissue was handled by Atom Age Industries, a company owned by former AFI bassist Geoff Kresge.

Tracks 1, 2 and 4 were later re-recorded for AFI's debut studio album Answer That and Stay Fashionable. Tracks 3, 5 were re-recorded too and became vinyl-only bonus tracks on Very Proud of Ya.

== Track listing ==
All lyrics are written by Davey Havok, except where noted; all music is composed by Geoff Kresge.

Side one
No.	Title	Lyrics	Length
1.	"Ny Quil"		2:13
2.	"Rizzo in the Box"	Havok, Adam Carson	1:50

Side two
No.	Title	Lyrics	Length
1.	"Who Said You Could Touch Me?"		1:30
2.	"I Wanna Get a Mohawk"		1:13
3.	"Love Is a Many Splendored Thing"	Kresge	1:37

== Personnel ==
Credits adapted from liner notes.

- Adam Carson – drums, vocals
- Davey Havok – vocals
- Geoff Kresge – bass, vocals, layout (reissue)
- Robert Maniaci – engineer
- Markus Stopholese – guitar

== Release history ==
Region	Date	Format	Variants	Edition	Label	Catalogue
United States	March 18, 1994	7-inch vinyl	pink	200 copies	Key Lime Pie	KEY EP 2
United States	December 16, 1994	7-inch vinyl	black	100 copies	Key Lime Pie	KEY EP 2
United States	June 25, 2016	7-inch vinyl	orange	100 copies	Key Lime Pie; Atom Age Industries	—N/a
United States	July 1, 2016	7-inch vinyl	blue	333 copies	Key Lime Pie; Atom Age Industries	—N/a
United States	September 9, 2016	7-inch vinyl	black		Key Lime Pie; Atom Age Industries	—N/a
