= Behind the Times (EP) =

Behind the Times E.P.

EP by AFI
- Released: June 11, 1993
- Recorded: April, 1993
- Studio: City of Light, Lakeport, CA
- Genre: Hardcore punk
- Length: 10:46
- Label: Key Lime Pie

AFI chronology
Dork (1993)	Behind the Times E.P. (1993)	Eddie Picnic's All Wet (1994)

Professional ratings
Review scores
Source	Rating
Punknews.org	4.5/5 stars

Behind the Times E.P. is an EP by AFI, released on 11 June 1993 on Key Lime Pie Records. It is the band's first EP, and second overall after their split EP with Loose Change earlier in the year.

The EP was reissued in October 2016 via Atom Age Industries, a company owned by former AFI bassist Geoff Kresge. The reissue featured slightly altered artwork on a glossier sleeve, but was otherwise identical.

Tracks 1 and 2 were re-recorded and released on the vinyl pressing of Very Proud of Ya and later on the AFI retrospective. Tracks 3–5 were rerecorded for AFI's debut full-length album, Answer That and Stay Fashionable.

== Track listing ==
Side one
No.	Title	Length
1.	"Who Said You Could Touch Me?"	1:28
2.	"Rolling Balls"	2:28
3.	"Highschool Football Hero"	1:38

Side two
No.	Title	Length
1.	"Rizzo in the Box"	2:01
2.	"Cereal Wars"	1:28
3.	"Born in the U.S. of A."	1:43

== Personnel ==
Credits adapted from liner notes.

- Adam Carson – drums
- Davey Havok – vocals
- Keith Gaudette – engineer
- Geoff Kresge – bass, layout (2016)
- Kim Hansen – back cover photo (2016)
- Markus Stopholese – guitar

Studios

- Recorded at City of Light, Lakeport, CA

== Release history ==
Region	Date	Format	Variants	Edition	Label	Catalogue
United States	June 11, 1993	7" vinyl	black	400 copies	Key Lime Pie	keyEP2
United States	December 16, 1994	7" vinyl	black	100 copies	Key Lime Pie	keyEP2
United States	October 15, 2016	7" vinyl	ivory; lavender; black		Key Lime Pie; Atom Age Industries	—N/a
