= This Is Berkeley, Not West Bay =

This Is Berkeley Not West Bay

EP by various artists
- Released: June 1, 1994
- Genre: Hardcore punk
- Label: Zafio

AFI chronology
Eddie Picnic's All Wet (1994)	This Is Berkeley Not West Bay (1994)	Fly in the Ointment (1995)

This Is Berkeley Not West Bay is an extended play released on June 1, 1994 by Zafio Records. It features AFI, Black Fork, Dead and Gone and Screw 32. There were 2 identical pressings in 1994 and 1995, both on black vinyl. The first was 2,000, the 2nd was 1,000.

The title and the cover of the EP is based on the Boston hardcore compilation This Is Boston, Not L.A.. Zafio Records co-founder Jesse Luscious loved the original Boston compilation so much he chose to pay homage to it through this release of 4 of the best young east bay punk bands of the time. It was the first or close to the first official release of each band. All 4 were growing in popularity in the local do-it-yourself punk scene at 924 Gilman Street in Berkeley, California.

The EP was reissued in 2011 on Zafio Records by Jesse Luscious in a one-time repressing of 1,000 copies on white vinyl. Each copy was hand-numbered and contained a free mp3 version of the 4 songs. The EP was remixed by Noah Landis and remastered by George Horn of Fantasy Studios.

The AFI song "Love Is a Many Splendored Thing" was re-recorded for AFI's album Very Proud of Ya, but was only featured on the vinyl version. Tim Armstrong of Rancid sings backups on their track.

AFI of course has gone on to be an incredibly influential band in the punk and 21st century emo scenes.

Dead And Gone's 1st 12" ("TV Baby") was recorded by Billie JoeArmstrong of Green Day. They subsequently signed to Alternative Tentacles for 2 more full-length albums.

Black Fork released a 7-inch on Zafio Records and eventually released their full-length "Rock For Loot" on Lookout Records

== Track listing ==
Side one
No.	Title	Artist	Length
1.	"People's Parking Lot"	Black Fork	2:56
2.	"Desperate"	Dead and Gone	3:01

Side two
No.	Title	Artist	Length
1.	"Love Is a Many Splendored Thing"	AFI	1:26
2.	"Bandwagon"	Screw 32	2:51

== Personnel ==
Credits adapted from liner notes.

- Kevin Army – sequencing
- Christopher – cover
- Murray Bowles – photography
- John Galden – mastering
- Noah Landis – remastering (reissue)

=== AFI ===
- Adam Carson – drums
- Tim Armstrong – producer
- Davey Havok – vocals
- Andy Ernst – recording
- Geoff Kresge – bass
- Lint – guest vocals
- Markus Stopholese – guitar
- Brett Reed – producer

Studios

- Recorded at The Art of Ears
