= Charles Atlas (disambiguation) =

Charles Atlas (1892–1972) was an Italian-American bodybuilder.

Charles Atlas may also refer to:

- Charles Atlas (artist), American video artist and film director
- "Charles Atlas", song by AFI from their album Very Proud of Ya
