= Adam Carson =

American musician (born 1975)

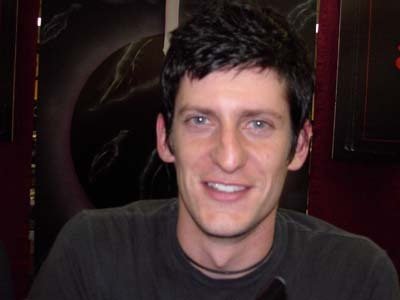
- Carson at a meet-and-greet in 2003

Background information
- Born: February 5, 1975 (age 51)
- Origin: Ukiah, California, United States
- Genres: Alternative rock; punk rock; hardcore punk
- Occupation: Musician
- Instrument: Drums
- Years active: 1991–present

Adam Alexander Carson (born February 5, 1975) is an American musician who is the drummer of the alternative rock band AFI. He and Davey Havok are the two original members left in the lineup. Carson also filled in as drummer for the psychobilly band Tiger Army. His drumming can be found on Tiger Army's Early Years EP as well as their debut album Tiger Army. Carson was also a member of Influence 13 – a band formed by Nick 13, Jade Puget (who joined AFI in 1998), Geoff Kresge (who left AFI in 1996), and two other friends.

== Biography ==
Adam Carson was raised in Ukiah, California, along with fellow AFI members Davey Havok and Jade Puget, and former members Geoff Kresge and Mark Stopholese. AFI has been described as a Bay Area band that is "one of the top hardcore/post-punk acts in the San Francisco Bay Area." Carson acquired an interest in music as early as age three, by which time he had amassed a small collection of 45-rpm records. As a toddler, Carson would also drag pots and pans out of his kitchen and assemble them into a drum set.

Carson's aspirations to be a drummer in a band were realized when he was eight or nine years old. He recalls, "I came home from the record store with Def Leppard's Pyromania, as well as a poster of them performing live. I remember listening to the record and looking at the poster on my wall and thinking that being in a rock band must be the best thing ever."

Carson played in his school band when he was in the sixth and seventh grade. Regarding his experience, he said, "I played the drums (surprise, surprise) and had hot pink drumsticks and thought I was totally rad. I thought because I owned a drum set and could play a rock beat that I knew everything there was to know. I got sent to the office a lot for messing around with the trombone players, and when we had substitutes I organized mass switching of instruments by the class. I think I ended up with a tuba at one point." However, he also believes his time in the band was misused, stating "I kind of wish I had paid more attention because I can't read music and know very little about scales and that type of thing. I quit band when the teacher called me a flake. I think he was pissed because I didn't want to join marching band, and I was pissed because he turned me down for jazz band and they had a drum kit. Even though I was a screw-up, I think being in the school band was educational and affected me positively."

Adam Carson met future bandmate Davey Havok in the fifth grade. It was not until high school that the two became friends and started AFI. While still in high school, Davey Havok, Mark Stopholese, and Vic Chalker formed AFI in November 1991. Stopholese suggested his friend, who was Adam Carson, to be drummer since he owned a drum set. Chalker was soon replaced by Geoff Kresge, and AFI subsequently recorded their debut EP, Dork. Regarding the first AFI practice, Carson recalls: "The first practice was pretty funny because no one knew how to play at all. I remember my dad was in the garage and spent like an hour trying to get the bass and guitar in tune. We didn't even know how to tune anything. I think we tried to play Angry Samoans and Germs covers. There really wasn't any chemistry at that time—it came a little later."

AFI briefly split in 1993 after each of its members graduated high school and attended different colleges. Carson attended UC Santa Cruz, while Havok and Stopholese attended the UC Berkeley and the University of Southern California (USC), respectively. In December of that year, the band reunited and played a show for approximately 200 fans at the Phoenix Theater in Petaluma, California. Encouraged by their enjoyment and success at the show, AFI became a full-time band.

On August 3, 2013, Carson married British model Eirinie Hamil. The couple have two daughters together, Luka Lily Carson, born on April 22, 2017, and Selah Marigold Carson, born on April 17, 2021.

== Career ==
Between 1993 and 1995 AFI released several vinyl EPs (Behind the Times; Eddie Picnic's All Wet; This Is Berkeley, Not West Bay; AFI/Heckle; Bombing the Bay; Fly in the Ointment) independently.

Their first full-length, Answer That and Stay Fashionable was released August 11, 1995, on Wingnut Records, and was produced by Tim Armstrong. AFI were soon after signed on to Nitro Records, Dexter Holland of The Offspring's label, and released Very Proud of Ya, their second album. Carson is the one who conceived the album title and has written the lyrics for the song "Key Lime Pie," (a tribute to one of his favorite foods) and contributed several lines to "Rizzo in the Box.".

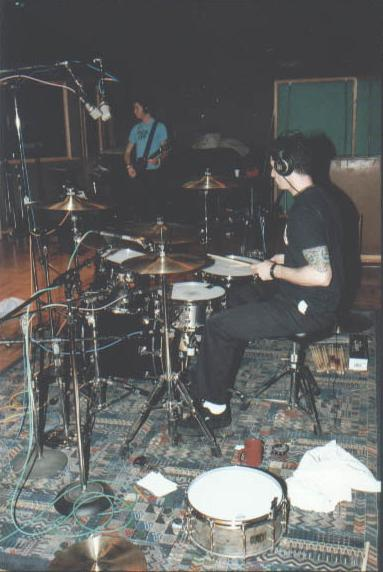
Adam Carson in studio with Jade Puget (background) during the recording of Black Sails in the Sunset

After several tours in support of the album Very Proud of Ya, Kresge decided to leave the group. His spot was filled by Hunter Burgan for the remaining Very Proud of Ya tour dates. Burgan went on to help AFI record Shut Your Mouth and Open Your Eyes (1997) and was invited to become the full-time bassist.

After recording the A Fire Inside EP (1998), Stopholese left the band and was replaced by Jade Puget, former member of Influence 13 and vocalist Havok's close friend. The band then recorded Black Sails in the Sunset (1999), a musical turning point which introduced AFI fans to a much darker sound, mixing the band's original hardcore roots with dark romantic influences.

The All Hallows EP (October 5, 1999) explored the horror punk genre touched upon on Black Sails, featuring artwork and lyrics containing Halloween themes. The EP spawned the single "Totalimmortal", a track later covered by The Offspring for the Me, Myself and Irene soundtrack. It received a fair amount of radio play and exposed AFI to larger audiences.

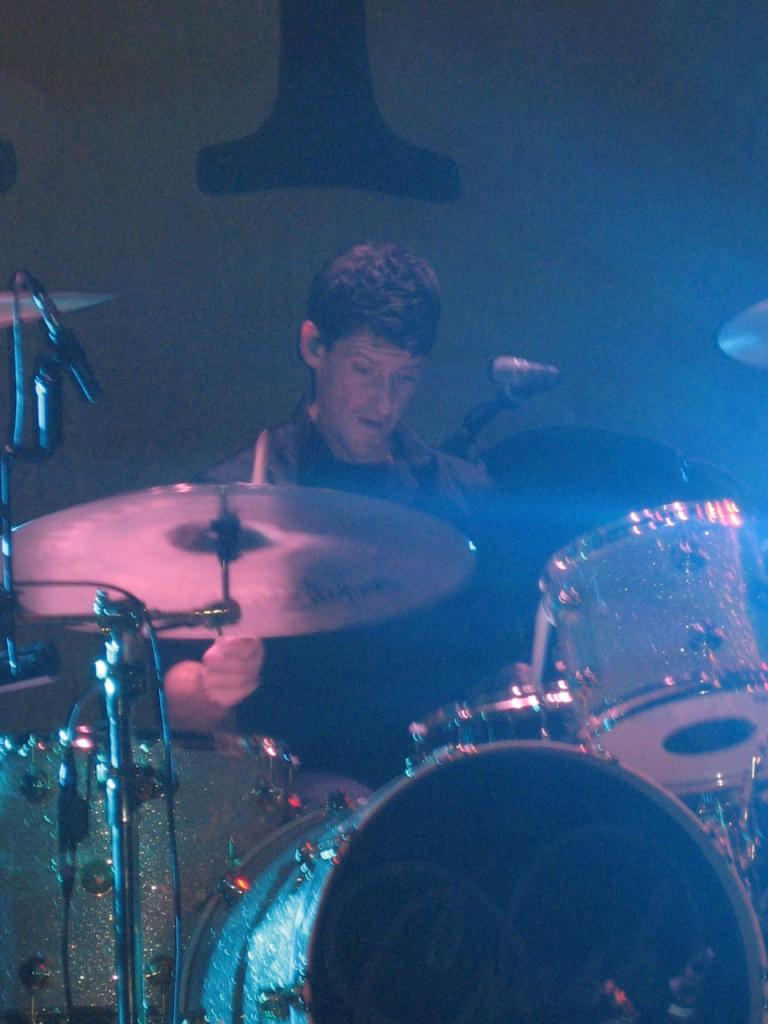
Adam Carson performing in Columbus, Ohio, in 2009

Carson played drums on the psychobilly band Tiger Army's debut album Tiger Army. Bandmate Davey Havok and Rancid's Tim Armstrong also contributed backing vocals to the album. The album was released on October 26, 1999.

On September 19, 2000, AFI released The Art of Drowning, which debuted on the Billboard charts at number 174, and peaked at number 9 on the Heatseekers chart. It continued to touch base with the horror punk genre, but expanded into styles that were a departure from previous works. The album brought the band unprecedented success in the underground scene, selling in excess of 100,000 copies. "The Days of the Phoenix" was released as a single and video and had some moderate mainstream success, garnering the band more TV and radio airplay.

In 2002, AFI left Nitro Records. A&R Luke Wood signed them to DreamWorks Records. Their first album for the label, Sing the Sorrow, was released in 2003. The songs "Girl's Not Grey", "The Leaving Song Pt. II", and "Silver and Cold" had some Billboard chart success and exposed the band to even larger audiences. They were nominated in the 2003 MTV Video Music Awards for the MTV2 award category for the "Girl's Not Grey" video, which came to be their first VMA.

In June 2006, AFI's seventh studio album, Decemberunderground, was released on Interscope Records. The album's first single "Miss Murder" reached No. 1 on the Billboard Modern Rock Charts. The release reflected the continually changing and growing fan base of the band, and the album debuted as No. 1 on the Billboard 200. The album has been certified Gold by the RIAA for sales of over 500,000 copies of the album.

AFI's eighth album, Crash Love, was released on September 29, 2009. The first single from the album, "Medicate", was released on August 25, 2009, and reached No. 7 on the Billboard Alternative Songs Chart. The album yielded a second single, "Beautiful Thieves", which peaked at No. 23. The album was very well received by critics.

AFI's ninth studio album, Burials, was released on October 22, 2013. The album's first single, "I Hope You Suffer" was released July 22, 2013, followed by the release of the album's second single, "17 Crimes" on August 6, 2013.

Carson is involved in a new band called The Reckless Kind (formed in 2011), described as "A 5 piece, heavy soul band." They recently finished recording their debut album, and have played several shows.

== Equipment ==
The following is the complete list of Adam Carson's equipment, as found on AFI News Headquarters

Drums and hardware

- Drum Workshop

Toms (depth x width)

- 18" x 24" bass drum
- 9" x 12" rack tom
- 14" x 16" floor tom
- 16" x 18" floor tom

Snares (depth x width)

- 6.5″ x 14″ Pork Pie (Brass)
- 5.5″ x 14″ Ayotte "Keplinger" (Steel)
- 5.5″ x 14″ Ludwig "Black Beauty" (Brass)
- 6.5″ x 14″ Legend (Maple)

Sticks

- Vater "Power" 5B (primarily)

Cymbals

- 22″ Zildjian A Custom Ping Ride
- 22″ Zildjian Z Custom Power Ride
- 22″ Zildjian A Ride
- 14″ Zildjian Rock Hi-Hats
- 15″ Zildjian K Bottom
- 15″ Zildjian Quickbeat Bottom Hi-Hat Combo

Drum heads

- Remo coated Emperors (toms and snares)
- Remo Powerstroke III (bass drum)

== Discography ==
=== With AFI ===
Studio albums

- Answer That and Stay Fashionable (1995)
- Very Proud of Ya (1996)
- Shut Your Mouth and Open Your Eyes (1997)
- Black Sails in the Sunset (1999)
- The Art of Drowning (2000)
- Sing the Sorrow (2003)
- Decemberunderground (2006)
- Crash Love (2009)
- Burials (2013)
- AFI (2017)
- Bodies (2021)
- Silver Bleeds the Black Sun... (2025)

=== With Tiger Army ===
- Tiger Army (October 26, 1999, Hellcat Records)
- Early Years EP (October 8, 2002, Hellcat Records)
