= Black Sails in the Sunset =

Studio album by AFI
- Released: May 18, 1999
- Genres: Hardcore punk; horror punk; melodic hardcore; post-hardcore
- Length: 46:04
- Label: Nitro
- Producer: AFI

AFI chronology
Black Sails EP (1999)	Black Sails in the Sunset (1999)	All Hallow's E.P. (1999)

Professional ratings
Review scores
Source	Rating
AllMusic	3/5 stars
Alternative Press	4.5/5 stars
Punknews.org	5/5 stars
The Rolling Stone Album Guide	3/5 stars

Black Sails in the Sunset is the fourth studio album by American rock band AFI. It was released on May 18, 1999, through Nitro Records. With the addition of guitarist Jade Puget as a permanent member, it is the first AFI album to feature the current line-up of the band.

== Background and music ==
The band members, sans Jade Puget, were roommates when guitarist Mark Stopholese departed AFI. Puget had just graduated from college and was living in Davey Havok's room while the band was on tour. They asked him to join the band as the new guitarist and immediately began writing the album; Puget had already written the basis for "Malleus Maleficarum". (Note: The title is that of a 15th-century Catholic treatise on identifying and exterminating supposed witches.) The band describes the album as forming the beginning of their subsequent sound, which contains more melodic vocals, as opposed to their first three albums, which maintain a fast, non-melodic punk sound. "God Called in Sick Today" marked the band's first ballad-style song.

The album has been described stylistically as hardcore punk, melodic hardcore, horror punk, and post-hardcore.

== Artwork ==
The band name and album title appears in the Caslon Antique font, in a semi-reflective silver on the outside cover. The band commissioned illustrator Alan Forbes to depict skulls emerging from the water on the cover. Bassist Hunter Burgan later shared a concept design from Forbes, which prominently depicts a literal skeleton and other faces and bones.

The album cover illustration features an uneasy black-and-blue ocean below an orange sky and dark clouds. A black-sailed ship on the horizon sails to the far right. (Note: The band's later album Sing the Sorrow (2003) features an icon of the ocean scene on the back in red. It shows part of the area the ship was in, but it is vacant.)

The back cover shows the same horizon but crops out the ship, which appears in white on the CD label and behind the CD tray. The inner edge of the CD case reveals the message "Beyond and To All Time I Stand", a lyric from the hidden track, "Midnight Sun". The liner notes feature an illustration of a ship in a storm, as well as photos of the band and a more decorative band logo.

== Critical reception ==
Black Sails in the Sunset was received well by critics. Alternative Press gave the album four-and-a-half out of five stars, commenting that "with new guitarist Jade Puget adding a sense of brooding, thespian eloquence to the disc's shadowy post-hardcore, AFI all but reinvented themselves," and "With longer, deeper, richer, more complex compositions than they've ever attempted before, Black Sails tackles everything from brooding hardcore ... to shimmering balladry..." The publication also went as far as to say that the album is "their first epic."

Decoy Music praised Havok's lyrical contribution to the album, commending his efforts to "find himself," saying "the way he expresses how he feels is pure poetry." Yarborough concluded by recommending the album to "anyone who likes heavy punk."

In 2021, it was named one of the 20 best metal albums of 1999 by Metal Hammer magazine.

== Track listing ==
All lyrics are written by Davey Havok; all music is composed by AFI (Havok, Adam Carson, Hunter Burgan, Jade Puget).

Standard edition
No.	Title	Length
1.	"Strength Through Wounding"	1:33
2.	"Porphyria Cutanea Tarda"	2:07
3.	"Exsanguination"	2:48
4.	"Malleus Maleficarum"	4:01
5.	"Narrative of Soul Against Soul"	2:29
6.	"Clove Smoke Catharsis"	4:38
7.	"The Prayer Position"	3:27
8.	"No Poetic Device"	2:16
9.	"Weathered Tome"	2:12
10.	"The Last Kiss"	3:03
11.	"At a Glance"	4:00
12.	"God Called in Sick Today" "Midnight Sun" (hidden track)	3:21; 3:02
Total length:		46:04

- Track 12 features excerpts of the poem "De profundis clamavi" by Charles Baudelaire
- "God Called In Sick Today" is separated from "Midnight Sun" on the original CD release by 7:10 of silence, bringing the total length of track 12 to 13:31.

Vinyl-only track
No.	Title	Length
7.	"Lower It"	2:18

Japan bonus track
No.	Title	Length
13.	"Who Knew?"	2:16
14.	"Midnight Sun" (hidden track)	3:04

- Due to a misprint, tracks 9 and 10 were mislabeled with their titles switched. Shown here is the correct track listing.

== B-sides ==
All tracks recorded during the album's sessions unless otherwise noted.

- "Lower It" is featured as track 7 on the vinyl release of the album. It was eventually re-released on the AFI retrospective compilation.
- "Who Knew?" is featured on the Black Sails EP. It is included as a bonus track on the Japanese release of the album.
- "Transference" is featured on the No Time to Kill compilation, released on Hunter Burgan's Checkmate Records.
- "Bawk Bawk Chewy" is featured as a hidden track on the No Time to Kill compilation. The track is commonly known as "The Chicken Song", although the CD-Text of the CD edition of No Time to Kill lists the track as "Bawk Bawk Chewy".
- "Weight of Words", a previously unreleased outtake from the sessions, appeared as a bonus track on the 25th anniversary vinyl release.

== Personnel ==
Credits adapted from liner notes.

- AFI – producer
  - Adam Carson – drums, percussion, backing vocals
  - Davey Havok – lead vocals
  - Hunter Burgan – bass, backing vocals
  - Jade Puget – guitar, backing vocals
- Andy Ernst – engineer, mixing
- Alan Forbes – cover illustration
- Dexter Holland – backing vocals
- Thad LaRue – assistant engineer
- Gabe Morford – photography
- Jamie Reilly – layout design

Studios

- Engineered and mixed at The Art of Ears, Hayward, CA
