= Viva Hate (band) =

- Origin: California, USA
- Genres: Psychobilly, hard rock, punk rock
- Years active: 2004–present
- Members: Matt Wedgley; Geoff Kresge; Eric Razo; Greg McEntee
- Website: vivahate.net

Viva Hate is a rock band that was formed late in the summer of 2004 by Geoff Kresge after he left Tiger Army.

Kresge was previously the bassist for AFI from 1992 to 1997. Lead vocalist Matt Wedgley was formerly a member of The Force with Hunter Burgan of AFI.

In February 2007, the band announced that Greg McEntee of Swingin' Utters joined on drums. He replaced original drummer Mad Dog Chad! from the psychobilly band12 Step Rebels that Kresge had previously produced, who left the band to focus on his own project, Ends !n Tragedy. In March 2007, the band opened for Kresge's former band, AFI, on several dates through California, Oregon and Nevada. In December 2007 Kresge rejoined his former band Tiger Army, although the official announcement of his return was not made until January 2008. Kresge has not officially left Viva Hate but the band currently tours without him. A new member named "Steve" has been filling in on the bass and is currently touring with the band. Steve is also the current bass player for Psychobilly band Henchmen, which also features Viva Hate guitarist Eric Razo on lead vocals and guitar.

Viva Hate recorded and released some demos which were available, in edited versions, on their MySpace profile for a short period of time. In October 2007, the band self-financed and released a limited edition, four track CD EP entitled "Hateful and Hollow" (a play on the album title for The Smiths' "Hatful of Hollow"). A vinyl 7" single for the song "Save Me" was released in 2008 by the French label Black Cat Records. In 2016 Wedge Records released a limited edition vinyl 12” LP of all ten songs ever recorded by the band.

== Band members ==
- Matt Wedgley – vocals
- Geoff Kresge – Bass
- Eric Razo – Guitar
- Greg Utter – drums
