= The Art of Drowning (album) =

Studio album by AFI
- Released: September 26, 2000
- Recorded: June 2000
- Studios: Fantasy Studios, Berkeley, California
- Genres: Hardcore punk; horror punk; melodic hardcore
- Length: 48:33
- Label: Nitro
- Producers: Chuck Johnson; AFI

AFI chronology
All Hallow's E.P. (1999)	The Art of Drowning (2000)	The Days of the Phoenix EP (2001)

Singles from The Art of Drowning
- 1. "The Days of the Phoenix" Released: May 2001 (EP)

The Art of Drowning is the fifth studio album by American rock band AFI. It was released on September 26, 2000, through Nitro Records

== Production ==
In June 2000, the band finished recording The Art of Drowning.

The album's second track, "The Lost Souls", was originally titled "The Art of Drowning". "The Despair Factor" features AFI's first notable use of electronic drums. On the song, vocalist Davey Havok states: "My whole life is a dark room... one big dark room", a line spoken by Winona Ryder in the film Beetlejuice (1988). The track title inspired the name of the band's official fan club, The Despair Faction.

=== Artwork ===
The band name and album title appear in orange in a hand-designed horror-punk-esque typeface. The front-cover illustration depicts a wintry graveyard with deformed stone-sculptures resembling either angels or demons. The central figure sits atop a frozen fountain and holds its hands in the prayer position. On the back cover, the scene continues to the left with more tombstones and a gate.

The CD booklet features additional illustrations: a man behind a fence (later sold as a toy named Art), a bed with candles on each bedpost, demonic forms convulsing in the corner of a room, an eye with fiery skull shapes inside, skeletal forms in front of a fire and a heart motif, and a demonic figure which also appears on the CD label, as well as behind the CD tray (and on the cover of The Days of the Phoenix EP). On the case's inner spine appears the hidden message "Battled", the title of the album's hidden track. The lyrics and spine use the Caslon Antique font, prominently featured on the band's previous album, Black Sails in the Sunset.

The album's art was produced by Alan Forbes—a San Francisco artist, and long-time collaborator with the band. Alan had previously produced the album art for 1999's Black Sails in the Sunset, as well as number of the band's merchandise designs, and tour posters.

== Release ==
The Art of Drowning was released in September 2000, through Nitro Records. In November, the band supported Rancid on their tour of the US. The lead single, "The Days of the Phoenix", experienced moderate airplay on modern rock stations, the most notable being KROQ-FM. A music video was released for the song, directed by Marc Webb. "Wester" was released in the form of a promotional single. In March 2001, the band toured across Canada with Death by Stereo, Catch 22, Ann Beretta, and Rise Against. "The Days of the Phoenix" was released as an EP in May 2001, to coincide with some UK shows; it included "Wester", and the outtake "A Winter's Tale". Between June and August 2001, the group performed on the Warped Tour. Following the September 11 attacks, the band were stuck in Japan for a time due to an air-travel lockdown in the US. As a result of this, the first half of the band's headlining US tour were postponed to November. In November 2002, the album was included as part of a vinyl box of the band's albums on Nitro Records.

== Reception ==
Professional ratings
Review scores
Source	Rating
AllMusic	3.5/5 stars
Alternative Press	5/5 stars
Decoy Music	3/5 stars
Ox-Fanzine	Favorable
Punknews	4/5 stars
The Rolling Stone Album Guide	3/5 stars

In an AllMusic review, MacKenzie Wilson says "Punk rawkers AFI exude another powerful disposition on their fifth album, The Art of Drowning. Issued on Dexter Holland's Nitro Records, AFI's quick and haughty, spiraling guitar riffs and crashing percussion make for another mishmash for single-fisted anthems for punk revivalists and enigmatic pop kids raging against the machine. Nothing short of Pennywise, D Generation, and Powerman 5000, AFI is rowdy with their old-school-inspired rants like "Ever and a Day" and "Of Greetings and Goodbyes." Frontman Davey Havok casts a rough demeanor, but certainly not anything intimidating because punk rock became friendly after the war of early-'90s grunge. The snarl and sweat are not as fashionable as it once was, but the attitude remains the same."

The album was listed by Alternative Press as one of the ten most influential punk albums of the year 2000. The album was included in Rock Sound's 101 Modern Classics list at number 40. In 2020, it was named one of the 20 best metal albums of 2000 by Metal Hammer magazine. Alternative Press ranked "The Days of the Phoenix" at number 80 on their list of the best 100 singles from the 2000s.

The album was the band's first to chart on the Billboard 200, at #174 for the week of October 13, 2000. It sold around 8,000 copies in its first week.

== Track listing ==
All lyrics are written by Davey Havok; all music is composed by AFI (Havok, Adam Carson, Hunter Burgan, Jade Puget).

Standard edition
No.	Title	Length
1.	"Initiation"	0:39
2.	"The Lost Souls"	2:42
3.	"The Nephilim"	2:35
4.	"Ever and a Day"	3:06
5.	"Sacrifice Theory"	1:58
6.	"Of Greetings and Goodbyes"	3:04
7.	"Smile"	1:31
8.	"A Story at Three"	3:53
9.	"The Days of the Phoenix"	3:27
10.	"Catch a Hot One"	2:54
11.	"Wester"	3:02
12.	"6 to 8"	4:21
13.	"The Despair Factor"	3:54
14.	"Morningstar"	3:16
15.	"Battled" (hidden track)	1:03

Vinyl and digital editions
No.	Title	Length
9.	"Dream of Waking"	3:03

== Bonus tracks and outtakes ==
All tracks recorded during The Art of Drowning sessions.

- "Battled" is featured as a hidden track on the CD format of the album. The name of the track also appears on the inner edge of the CD case.
- "Dream of Waking" is featured as track 9 on the a-side of the 12" vinyl edition of the album. It was later released on the Nitro Records Punkzilla compilation. It also appears on the iTunes version of the album.
- "A Winter's Tale" was featured on The Days of the Phoenix EP, as well as the 2004 AFI compilation.

== Personnel ==
Personnel taken from The Art of Drowning liner notes.

AFI

- Davey Havok – lead and backing vocals
- Jade Puget – guitar, backing vocals
- Hunter Burgan – bass, backing vocals, drum machine programming
- Adam Carson – drums, backing vocals

Additional musicians

- Nick 13 – backing vocals
- Joe Clements – backing vocals
- Lars Frederiksen – backing vocals
- Chris "X-13" Higgins – backing vocals
- Thadd LaRue – backing vocals
- Darcy Vaughan – viola on "Morningstar"

Technical personnel

- AFI – production
- Chuck Johnson – production, engineering
- Michael Anderson – engineering assistance
- Frank Rinella – engineering assistance
- Andy Ernst – mixing
- Thadd LaRue – mixing assistance
- Eddy Schreyer – mastering
- Alan Forbes – artwork
- Jamie Reilly – layout

== Chart positions ==
Chart (2000)	Peak position
US Billboard 200	174
US Heatseekers Albums (Billboard)	9
US Independent Albums (Billboard)	12
