= Silver and Cold =

2003 single by AFI

Single by AFI

from the album Sing the Sorrow
- Released: November 11, 2003
- Recorded: 2003
- Genre: Emo; gothic rock
- Length: 4:11
- Label: DreamWorks
- Songwriters: Hunter Burgan, Adam Carson, David Paden Marchand, Jade Puget
- Producer: Jerry Finn

AFI singles chronology
"The Leaving Song Pt. II" (2003)	"Silver and Cold" (2003)	"Miss Murder" (2006)

"Silver and Cold" is a song by American rock band AFI. It was the third single released from their sixth studio album Sing the Sorrow in 2003, reaching radio on November 11. A music video was directed by John Hillcoat. It received moderate airplay, peaking at No. 7 on the Alternative Songs chart.

== Track listing ==
1. "Silver and Cold" (Radio Edit) – 3:42
2. "Silver and Cold" (Album Version) – 4:11

== Music video ==
The music video for "Silver and Cold" was directed by John Hillcoat and shot in Prague, Czech Republic. The band came up with the concept for the video and director Hillcoat developed it. It shows band members Jade Puget, Adam Carson, and Hunter Burgan rushing to stop the vocalist Davey Havok from committing suicide by jumping off of the Manes Bridge, but as they reach him, they die in a horrific car crash. Havok appears to walk away unharmed but you can see his arm pass through a bystander as if he is a ghost.

== Chart positions ==
Chart	Peak position
Hot Mainstream Rock Tracks	39
Alternative Songs	7
