= The Daggers =

Canadian rock band

- Origin: Calgary, Alberta, Canada
- Genres: Punk rock
- Years active: 1997–present
- Members: Brad Paffe; Paul Charlton; Brian Doss
- Past members: Geoff Kresge; Graham Evans; Brian Doss; Steve Elaschuk; Kevin O'Brien; Chris Walsh; Troy Zak

The Daggers are a punk rock band from Calgary, Alberta, Canada.

== History ==
The band formed in 1997 and their music is heavily influenced by late seventies punk and rock n roll bands. Original members (and their previous bands) were Brad Paffe (Art Bergmann Band), Geoff Kresge (AFI), Paul Charlton (Forbidden Dimension), and Graham Evans (Huevos Rancheros/Forbidden Demension).

The Daggers signed with Sloth Records, and in 1998 released a self-titled EP, and a single, "She Told Me She Said/Nowhere To Go".

The Daggers performed locally, and in 2002 released the seve-track Right Between the Eyes, which was positively reviewed, and received airplay on campus and community radio stations. The band toured around western Canada in 2005.

The band had many lineup changes over the years. By 2006, original members Paffe and Charleton had been joined by bassist Troy Zak as well as Chris Walsh on lead guitar and drums. This lineup recorded the band's album, Tear It To Pieces, which was released through Sloth in 2006; critical reception of this album was mixed.

== Band members ==
- Brad Paffe – vocals, guitar
- Paul Charlton – drums
- Brian Doss – bass, vocals

=== Former members ===
- Geoff Kresge – bass, vocals (1998–2000)
- Graham Evans – guitar, vocals (1997–2004)
- Brian Doss – bass, vocals (2000–2002)(current member)
- Steve Elaschuk – bass, vocals (2002–2005)
- Kevin O'Brien – guitar (2004)
- Chris Walsh – guitar, vocals (2004–2008)
- Troy Zak – bass, vocals (2005–2007)

== Discography ==
- The Daggers, EP with 7" red vinyl single (1998, Sloth Records)
- Right Between the Eyes - CD (2002, Sloth Records)
- Tear It To Pieces - CD (2006, Sloth Records)
