= Dork (EP) =

Dork / Stick Around

EP by AFI and Loose Change
- Released: March 2, 1993
- Recorded: August and October 1992
- Studio: City of Light, Lakeport
- Genre: Hardcore punk
- Label: Key Lime Pie Records; Wilson House
- Producer: A.F.I.; Keith Gaudette

AFI chronology
Dork (1993)	Behind the Times E.P. (1993)

Loose Change chronology
Stick Around (1993)	Lucky Dog E.P. (1994)

Dork / Stick Around is a split extended play by American punk rock bands AFI and Loose Change (which featured future AFI guitarist Jade Puget), released on March 2, 1993, on Key Lime Pie Records and Wilson House Records.

This was AFI's first release, put out within a year of the band's formation, and was limited to around 200 copies. The cover is a picture of AFI drummer Adam Carson. "NyQuil" was written by then-bassist Vic Chalker, and was re-recorded for the band's first full-length album, Answer That and Stay Fashionable.

Counterfeits were sold on eBay for at least a year, which prompted former AFI bassist Geoff Kresge to reveal their inauthenticity. Kresge himself reissued AFI's Dork with an added outtake on September 29, 2017, without the current band's consent.

== Track listing ==
Dork (Side one)
No.	Title	Length
1.	"Red Hat"	1:17
2.	"Self Pity"	0:57
3.	"NyQuil"	1:48
Total length:		4:02

Stick Around (Side two)
No.	Title	Length
1.	"Stick Around"
2.	"Loose Change"
3.	"Brandy"

=== 2017 reissue ===
Dork (Side one)
No.	Title	Length
1.	"Red Hat"
2.	"NyQuil"

Dork (Side two)
No.	Title	Length
1.	"Mini Trucks Suck"
2.	"Self Pity"

== Personnel ==
Credits adapted from liner notes.

=== AFI ===
- Adam Carson – drums
- Davey Havok – vocals
- Keith Gaudette – engineer
- Geoff Kresge – bass
- Markus Stopholese – guitar

Studios

- Recorded at City of Light, Lakeport
- Mastered and pressed at Alberti

=== Loose Change ===
- Nate Daugherty – drums
- Levi McCann – rhythm guitar
- Jade Puget – lead guitar, vocals
- Chon Travis – bass, vocals
- Vienna Boys Choir on 3 packs a day – backing vocals
