= Girl's Not Grey =

2003 single by AFI

Single by AFI

from the album Sing the Sorrow
- Released: January 12, 2003
- Recorded: 2002
- Genre: Pop-punk; emo; hard rock; pop rock
- Length: 3:10
- Label: DreamWorks
- Songwriter: AFI
- Producer: Jerry Finn

AFI singles chronology
"The Days of the Phoenix" (2000)	"Girl's Not Grey" (2003)	"The Leaving Song Pt. II" (2003)

"Girl's Not Grey" is a song by American rock band AFI. It was released as the debut single from their sixth studio album, Sing the Sorrow (2003), debuting on radio on February 4, 2003. It is the band's third most successful single, peaking at No. 7 on the Alternative Songs Chart and No. 14 on the Bubbling Under Hot 100 Chart. David Slade directed a music video, featuring elements which have been described as similar to those in Alice in Wonderland.

It is a playable track in the video games Rock Band 2 and Guitar Hero Live, and a downloadable track for the video game Guitar Hero 5 and the iPod Touch application Tap Tap Revenge.

== Background ==
According to guitarist Jade Puget, most of the songs for Sing the Sorrow had already been written by the time he wrote the music for the song in a hotel in Toronto, Ontario. Vocalist Davey Havok then wrote the lyrics, with Puget penning the background vocals. Puget later reflected that he had thought the song could have been the album opener, but he was the only band member to think so.

== Critical reception ==
"Girl's Not Grey" received generally positive reviews from critics, who considered it a pop-punk song from the album. AllMusic reviewer Johnny Loftus felt that the chorus of the backing voices shifted the song from hardcore punk to pop, and called the single "a car-radio singalong of pure genius".

== Music video ==
A music video directed by David Slade was released shortly after the single's release. According to the Fuse TV program IMX, the video is similar to Slade's previous video for "Sour Girl" by Stone Temple Pilots, which also features a strange environment and human-sized rabbit characters. The concepts within the video are similar to the basic plot of Lewis Carroll's novel Alice's Adventures in Wonderland, featuring a little girl that follows a rabbit into an alternate reality.

A completely black version of the band performs in an alley, where a blue-haired girl in black clothing follows a pink human-sized rabbit through Jade Puget to an alternate reality, where the band is seen performing in full color. The location is a mostly red and pink landscape, with pink flower petals falling. The rabbit is now blue and the girl's clothes pink, with her head now a plastic cartoon mask expressing euphoria. The girl continues to follow the rabbit to the top of a hill, where she sees the band performing. She is saddened after seeing that the rabbit has left her. She is enveloped by a whirlwind of petals, which consume her. Petals burst out of Havok's chest, and even fall in the alley where the colorless version of the band finishes playing the song.

There is also an alternate version of the video which simply features the band performing in the alley covered in black paint but does not feature the girl, human-sized rabbits, or the alternate reality setting.

By early 2023, the rabbit suit had been donated to the Punk Rock Museum in Las Vegas, which opened on April 1 of that year.

== Live performances ==
"Girl's Not Grey" was first performed live on January 8, 2002, at the Forum in Inglewood, California. As of April, 1, 2019, it had been performed 538 times, making it the most performed song by AFI. In an interview with Alternative Press, drummer Adam Carson noted that the song "really works as the first song in a set, which is why I think we've played that song probably more than anything".

== Track listing ==
UK 7"

1. "Girl's Not Grey" – 3:10
2. "The Hanging Garden" (Live at BBC) (Note: Previously covered by AFI for the A Fire Inside EP) – 3:45

Europe

1. "Girl's Not Grey" – 3:10
2. "This Celluloid Dream" (Demo) – 4:18
3. "Synesthesia" (Demo) – 4:35
4. "Girl's Not Grey" (Final) Clip – 3:11

Germany

1. "Girl's Not Grey" – 3:10
2. "This Celluloid Dream" (Demo) – 4:18

UK CD 1

1. "Girl's Not Grey" - 3:10
2. "The Hanging Garden" (live at BBC) - 3:45
3. "Synesthesia" (Demo) - 4:35
4. "Girl's Not Grey" (Final) Clip - 3:11

UK CD 2

1. "Girl's Not Grey" - 3:10
2. "Reiver's Music" (336 Sessions) - 3:23
3. "Now The World" (336 Sessions) - 4:01
4. "Girl's Not Grey" (Prelude) Clip - 3:11

== Chart positions ==
Chart (2003)	Peak position
UK Singles (OCC)	22
US Alternative Airplay (Billboard)	7
US Bubbling Under Hot 100 (Billboard)	14
US Mainstream Rock (Billboard)	33
