= The Circus Tents =

American band

Circus Tents
- Origin: Grass Valley, California, United States
- Genres: Skate punk, Punk rock
- Years active: 1989–1993
- Label: Insurrection Records
- Past members: Matt Wedgley; Jon Sortland; Chad Cox; Scot Pickering; Jeff Jones

The Circus Tents were an American band active from 1989 to 1993 from Grass Valley, California, United States. It consisted of Matt Wedgley as the lead vocalist, Jon Sortland on drums, Chad Cox on bass, Scot Pickering and Jeff Jones on guitar. They released a 12 song self-titled cassette tape in 1990 (only 100 copies being made) and a 4 song 7" record titled Hard Up on Insurrection Records in 1992 (only having 1,000 copies made). They had a couple of songs featured on early Powell Peralta skate videos for Chris Senn. They achieved international publicity when Billie Joe Armstrong put a Circus Tents sticker on his guitar and AFI covered their song "Open Your Eyes" on their record Answer That and Stay Fashionable. The Circus Tents also recorded the song "I Hate Cops" by The Authorities for an unreleased Authorities tribute album, which also featured the bands Screeching Weasel and The Meatmen.

== Reunion ==
In 2018, The Circus Tents and The Force briefly reunited at The Miners Foundry Cultural Center to play a concert in honor of former member Chad Cox, who had died in 2014. Hunter Burgan played bass for The Circus Tents in Cox's stead, and Jon Sortland filled in his role as drummer for The Force.

== Bands after breakup ==
- Matt Wedgley: The Force, The Wimpy Heroes, Viva Hate, Dirty Filthy Mugs
- Jon Sortland: E V Kain, Cigar, American City, Leopold and His Fiction, Broken Bells, The Shins
- Scot Pickering: The Wimpy Heroes, Superuin
- Chad Cox: The Force
- Jeff Jones: Cigar
