= All Hallow's E.P. =

EP by AFI
- Released: October 5, 1999
- Studio: Art of Ears Studios, Hayward, California
- Genre: Hardcore punk; horror punk
- Length: 12:59
- Label: Nitro
- Producer: AFI

AFI chronology
Black Sails in the Sunset (1999)	All Hallow's E.P. (1999)	The Art of Drowning (2000)

Singles from All Hallow's E.P.
- 1. "Totalimmortal" Released: 1999

Professional ratings
Review scores
Source	Rating
The Spill Magazine	4/5 stars

All Hallow's E.P. is an extended play by American punk rock band AFI. It was released on October 5, 1999, through Nitro Records. It contains three original songs and a cover of the Misfits song "Halloween".

== Overview ==
"Totalimmortal" was released as a single and had a music video directed by Brent Waroniecki. The video is black and white and features the band playing in a dark room, walking around at night and in forests.

The track was covered by The Offspring for the soundtrack to the film Me, Myself and Irene as well. "The Boy Who Destroyed the World" was included in the video game Tony Hawk's Pro Skater 3.

The album was released on October 5, 1999, through Nitro Records. The band supported its release with a tour with Sick of It All in October and November, before supporting Danzig in late November. A limited edition 20th-anniversary picture disc was released on October 25, 2019.

== Artwork ==
The band name and EP title appear in yellow in an illustrated font characteristic of horror punk. In the foreground of the illustration by Alan Forbes are a pumpkin-headed scarecrow and a hissing black cat standing on a grassy knoll. Behind them are a wooden fence and a dead tree with face-like forms hidden in its bark. Bats fly in the dark blue sky, and a few tombstones are visible on top of a more distant hill.

The back illustration shows the landscape to the left of the scarecrow, with additional hills, fences, tombstones, bats and dead trees, as well as jack-o'-lanterns and a small shack in front of a large moon. The track listing appears in the same illustrated typeface as the cover. The foreground jack-o'-lantern also appears in the liner notes (along with band photos), on the CD label and behind the CD tray. On the inside spine is the hidden message "Boo!"

== Track listing ==
All lyrics are written by Davey Havok; all music is composed by AFI (Havok, Adam Carson, Hunter Burgan, Jade Puget), except where noted.

No.	Title	Writer(s)	Length
1.	"Fall Children"		3:12
2.	"Halloween" (Misfits cover)	Glenn Danzig	3:58
3.	"The Boy Who Destroyed the World"		3:05
4.	"Totalimmortal"		2:44
Total length:			12:59

== Personnel ==
Credits adapted from liner notes.

- AFI – producer, backing vocals
- Adam Carson – drums
- Andy Ernst – engineer, mixing
- Alan Forbes – cover illustration
- Davey Havok – lead vocals
- Hunter Burgan – bass
- Thad LaRue – assistant engineer, backing vocals, photography (Davey, Jade, Hunter)
- Jade Puget – guitar
- Jamie Reilly – art direction
- Pete Saporito – photography (Adam)
- Eddy Schreyer – mastering

Studios

- Recorded at The Art of Ears
- Mastered at Oasis Mastering
