= Sing the Sorrow =

Studio album by AFI
- Released: March 11, 2003
- Recorded: August–December 2002
- Studios: Cello, Los Angeles, California
- Genres: Post-hardcore; punk rock; emo
- Length: 55:54
- Label: DreamWorks • Nitro
- Producers: Jerry Finn, Butch Vig

AFI chronology
The Art of Drowning (2000)	Sing the Sorrow (2003)	AFI (2004)

AFI video chronology
Clandestine (2003)	I Heard a Voice – Live from Long Beach Arena (2006)

Singles from Sing the Sorrow
- 1. "Girl's Not Grey" Released: January 12, 2003; 2. "The Leaving Song Pt. II" Released: August 3, 2003; 3. "Silver and Cold" Released: November 11, 2003

Sing the Sorrow is the sixth studio album by American rock band AFI. Recorded at Cello Studios in Los Angeles, California, between 2002 and 2003, the album was produced by Jerry Finn and Butch Vig. It was the band's first release on a major label, DreamWorks Records.

Sing the Sorrow received acclaim from music critics, who praised its melodies and musicianship, as well as its mature sound in comparison to the band's previous material. The album sold 96,000 copies in its first week of release in the United States, reaching number 5 on the Billboard 200, and also charted in Canada and the United Kingdom. It has since been certified Platinum by both the Recording Industry Association of America (RIAA) and Music Canada. The album was supported by three singles: "Girl's Not Grey", "The Leaving Song Pt. II" and "Silver and Cold", which subsequently charted on the Alternative and Rock Songs charts.

== Music and lyrics ==
Musically, Sing the Sorrow is a departure from the hardcore punk and horror punk genres featured in the band's previous material. The album features elements of hardcore punk, post-hardcore, alternative rock, gothic rock, and emo. More experimental than previous AFI albums, Sing the Sorrow includes instruments other than guitar, bass and drums, such as piano and strings. The opening track features some electronic programming from Jade Puget.

Alternative Press noted that the lyrics make use of "dark poeticism". A hidden track consists of a spoken word poem (accompanied by piano keys and distorted synth sounds) and the closing song "This Time Imperfect".

== Artwork and liner notes ==
Sing the Sorrow was released with three different covers, featuring different colors for the text, logo, and iconography. (Note: An early idea for the album cover depicted a burning rose. This was repurposed as the cover for some releases of the "Girl's Not Grey" single.) The colors were red, silver and black. The original cover features red artwork. Several of the first pressings in the United States and United Kingdom featured the silver cover. While the silver pressings are now rare and out of print, the digital version of Sing the Sorrow among iTunes still features the silver artwork. The black cover was exclusively available at shows on the U.S. album release tour and the band's official fan club online store. International versions of the album use different artwork on the album label, often containing a picture of an inverted octopus whilst others contain a foraminifer or a dead bird. The animal pictures are taken from the book Animals by Jim Harter.

== Release ==
The album was released on March 11, 2003, through DreamWorks Records. In mid-to-late June and mid-to-late July, the group appeared on the Warped Tour.

The hard-book cover of the limited edition

=== Special limited edition ===
A special limited edition was released that included the short film Clandestine on DVD, directed by Norwood Cheek. It also contained a 60-page booklet featuring extensive artwork and lyrics as well.

The film is eight minutes in length and stars all four band members. The film contains references to imagery and concepts from the album. The film focuses on the four band members trying to obtain a mysterious box which bears resemblance to the Sing the Sorrow album cover. The film features two playable soundtracks, one by bassist Hunter Burgan and the other by guitarist Jade Puget. Only 20,000 copies were pressed.

== Reception ==
Professional ratings
Aggregate scores
Source	Rating
Metacritic	81/100
Review scores
Source	Rating
AllMusic	5/5 stars
Alternative Press	5/5
Blender	3/5 stars
Entertainment Weekly	D
Los Angeles Times	3/4 stars
Q	4/5 stars
Rolling Stone	4/5 stars
The Rolling Stone Album Guide	4/5 stars
Slant Magazine	4/5 stars
Spin	B+

Sing the Sorrow was met with critical acclaim upon release. The review aggregator Metacritic scored the album an 81 out of 100, based on 11 reviews, with the mention of "universal acclaim". E! Online called it a "well-crafted mix of hardcore bluster, determined melody and anthemic grandness that boasts depth and texture rarely heard from the Warped Tour ilk." Alternative Press awarded the album a perfect score, saying that, "Sing the Sorrow soars with the kind of melodies hit singles are made of, yet it somehow persists with AFI's esoteric darkness." Allmusic awarded the album a perfect score and wrote: "Emerging in early 2003 with Sing the Sorrow, it's clear the molting process AFI began with Black Sails in Sunset is complete," and concluded that, "Whatever factions of the band's longterm fans might think of their major-label affiliation, Sing the Sorrow represents a coalescing of the band's sound." Rolling Stone awarded the album a 4 out of 5, claiming that "Sing the Sorrow is not exactly a concept album, but it does have a singleness of dark purpose that builds in momentum as the disc progresses." The New York Times rated Sing the Sorrow as the tenth-best album of 2003. Conversely, Entertainment Weekly gave the album a 'D', commenting that "The songs combine the most pretentious and overworked elements of their influences."

The album ranked number 77 in the October 2006 issue of Guitar World magazine's List of the 100 Greatest Guitar Albums of All Time. The album's lead single, "Girl's Not Grey", received a 2003 VMA for the 'Best MTV2 Music Video' category. Alternative Press ranked "Girl's Not Grey" at number 63 on their list of the best 100 singles from the 2000s. In 2024, Loudwire staff elected it as the best hard rock album of 2003.

== Singles ==
Three singles, each with an accompanying music video, were released from Sing the Sorrow: "Girl's Not Grey", "The Leaving Song Pt. II," and "Silver and Cold." "Girl's Not Grey" was the highest-charting single, reaching No. 7 on the Billboard Alternative Songs chart, No. 33 on the Hot Mainstream Rock Tracks chart, and No. 22 on the UK Singles Chart. The second single, "The Leaving Song Pt. II" charted at No. 16 on the Alternative Songs chart, No. 31 on the Hot Mainstream Rock Tracks chart, No. 27 in Australia, and No. 43 in the UK. The third and final single, "Silver and Cold" reached No. 7 on the Alternative Songs chart and No. 39 on the Mainstream Rock Tracks chart.

== Track listing ==
All tracks are written by AFI (Davey Havok, Adam Carson, Hunter Burgan, Jade Puget).

Standard edition
No.	Title	Length
1.	"Miseria Cantare – The Beginning"	2:57
2.	"The Leaving Song Pt. II"	3:31
3.	"Bleed Black"	4:15
4.	"Silver and Cold"	4:11
5.	"Dancing Through Sunday"	2:26
6.	"Girl's Not Grey"	3:10
7.	"Death of Seasons"	3:59
8.	"The Great Disappointment"	5:27
9.	"Paper Airplanes (Makeshift Wings)"	3:58
10.	"This Celluloid Dream"	4:11
11.	"The Leaving Song"	2:44
12.	"...But Home Is Nowhere" "The Spoken Word" (hidden track) "This Time Imperfect" (hidden track)	15:07: 4:16; 10:38
Total length:		55:54

Notes

1. On digital editions, "This Time Imperfect" is not a hidden track, and includes "The Spoken Word" (listed as "...But Home Is Nowhere") before it as track 12.

Japanese edition
No.	Title	Length
13.	"Now the World"	4:03
Total length:		59:57

UK edition
No.	Title	Length
12.	"...But Home Is Nowhere"	3:51
13.	"Synthesthesia"	3:30
14.	"Now the World" "The Spoken Word" (hidden track) "This Time Imperfect" (hidden track)	15:19 * 4:16: 10:38
Total length:		63:28

Special limited edition DVD
No.	Title	Length
1.	"Clandestine" (short film) (playable in two versions; Jade's soundtrack and Hunter's soundtrack)	8:06
2.	"Death of Seasons" (Audio 5.1 Mix)	3:59
3.	"Silver and Cold" (Audio 5.1 Mix)	4:11
4.	"...But Home Is Nowhere" (Audio 5.1 Mix)	3:51
5.	"The Great Disappointment" (Audio 5.1 Mix)	5:27
6.	"Reivers' Music" (Audio 5.1 Mix)	3:22
Total length:		28:16

== B-sides and outtakes ==
All songs presumably recorded during the Sing the Sorrow sessions unless otherwise noted.

- "Reivers' Music" is featured on the DVD of the special limited edition album and the "Girl's Not Grey" single, as well as the 336 EP (2002), on which it backs the demo version of "Now the World".
- Demo versions of "Synthesthesia", "This Celluloid Dream", "The Great Disappointment", "Paper Airplanes (makeshift wings)", "...But Home is Nowhere", "The Leaving Song", and "Now the World" can be found as b-sides on the album's single releases.
- "Rabbits are Roadkill on Rt. 37" was released on the MySpace Records: Volume 1 compilation in November 2005 and as a bonus track on the UK and Australian editions of Decemberunderground (2006).
- "Carcinogen Crush" (Note: The title can be found in the special limited edition book of Sing the Sorrow.) was recorded during the Sing the Sorrow sessions, but the band felt that it did not fit the album. It was later re-recorded during the Decemberunderground sessions, but remained unreleased. It was eventually released as a bonus track on the video game Guitar Hero III: Legends of Rock (2007) and as a digital single on December 4, 2007. It was also featured on the "Medicate" UK vinyl and the Japanese version of Crash Love (2009). The Sing the Sorrow version remains unreleased.
- "100 Words" was not released until 2009 on the deluxe version of Crash Love.

== Personnel ==
Credits adapted from the album's booklet.

AFI

- Davey Havok – lead vocals, backing vocals
- Jade Puget – guitars, programming, keyboards, backing vocals, co-lead vocals on "Silver and Cold"
- Hunter Burgan – bass, backing vocals
- Adam Carson – drums, percussion, backing vocals

Additional musicians

- Susie Katayama – cello
- Roger Joseph Manning Jr. – additional keys on "...But Home is Nowhere"
- Anna-Lynne Williams – guest female vocals
- Jasmine Weist – guest female vocals
- Nick 13 – additional backing vocals
- Geoff Kresge – additional backing vocals
- Chris Holmes – additional backing vocals
- Ralph Saenz – additional backing vocals
- Matt Wedgley – additional backing vocals
- Steve Cunningham – additional backing vocals
- St. Mileon's Church – choir
- Gibson Casian – spoken word vocals
- Hans Wold – spoken word vocals

Production

- Jade Puget – executive production
- Jerry Finn – production, mixing, additional backing vocals
- Butch Vig – production, additional backing vocals
- Joe McGrath – recording, additional backing vocals
- Chris Holmes – assistant engineering
- Alan Mason – assistant engineering
- Dan Chase – assistant engineering
- Stacey Dodds – assistant engineering, vocoder on "Death of Seasons"
- Alan Sanderson – assistant engineering
- Alan Mason – additional technical assistance
- Garner Knutsen – drum technician
- Mike Fasano – drum technician
- Brian Gardner – mastering
- Luke Wood – A&R, additional backing vocals
- Jason Noto – art direction, design
- Doug Cunningham – art direction, design
- Alan Forbes – icon illustration
- Matthew Welsh – photography

== Charts ==
=== Weekly charts ===
Weekly chart performance for Sing the Sorrow
Chart (2003)	Peak position
Australian Albums (ARIA)	65
Canadian Albums (Billboard)	10
UK Albums (Official Charts)	52
US Billboard 200	5

=== Year-end charts ===
Year-end chart performance for Sing the Sorrow
Chart (2003)	Position
US Billboard 200	107

== Certifications ==
Certifications for Sing the Sorrow
Region	Certification	Certified units/sales
Australia (ARIA)	Gold	35,000^{^}
Canada (Music Canada)	Platinum	100,000^{^}
United Kingdom (BPI)	Silver	60,000^{‡}
United States (RIAA)	Platinum	1,000,000^{^}
^{^} Shipments figures based on certification alone.^{‡} Sales+streaming figures based on certification alone.

== Release history ==
Standard edition

Region	Date	Label	Format	Catalogue
United Kingdom	March 10, 2003	DreamWorks	CD	450 448-2, 450 448-2(A), 450 448-2(B)
United States	March 11, 2003	DreamWorks	CD	0044-50380-2
Australia	March 31, 2003	DreamWorks	CD	450 380-2
Japan	April 22, 2003	DreamWorks	CD	UICW-1034

Special limited edition

Region	Date	Label	Format	Catalogue
United States	March 11, 2003	Adeline	Vinyl LP	65522300261
United States	April 22, 2003	DreamWorks	CD+DVD	0044-50440-0

== Legacy ==
In November 2022, the band announced that they would play the album in its entirety the first and only time at the Kia Forum in Los Angeles on March 11, 2023, the album's 20th anniversary. Jawbreaker, Chelsea Wolfe, and Choir Boy were slated to open the event. The band dedicated "Paper Airplanes (makeshift wings)" to Jawbreaker and "The Leaving Song" to album producer Jerry Finn, who died in 2008. Additionally, the out-of-print vinyl album was reissued for the anniversary.

Professional wrestler CM Punk used 'Miseria Cantare – The Beginning' as his theme song throughout his stay in Ring of Honor from 2002 to 2005. He later re-used the song for his entrance at the 2022 Revolution event for All Elite Wrestling, as well as at WWE's WrestleMania 42 in 2026, the latter of which was being used during a montage of his wrestling career prior to his entrance.
