= Wedge Records =

American record label

- Founded: 1990
- Founder: Matt "Wedge" Wedgley
- Country of origin: United States

Wedge Records is a 1990s California record label specializing in punk rock/hardcore. The label is most noted for releasing early AFI and Frantics records.

It was founded by Matt "Wedge" Wedgley of The Circus Tents, The Force, and Viva Hate.

== See also ==
- List of record labels
