= Magic set =

A magic set or magic kit is a product containing a variety of props materials, and instructions to perform a variety of magic tricks. The tricks included often rely heavily on gimmicked props, and require little skill to perform. In addition to providing props for various tricks, these sets will often contain instructions for many more, elevating the number of tricks that can be advertised. Sets directed at adults, known as "executive" magic sets, often have higher-quality materials and more complex tricks.
