= Shut Your Mouth and Open Your Eyes =

Studio album by AFI
- Released: November 11, 1997
- Studio: Art of Ears, Hayward, California
- Genre: Hardcore punk, Skate punk
- Length: 28:26
- Label: Nitro
- Producer: AFI

AFI chronology
Very Proud of Ya (1996)	Shut Your Mouth and Open Your Eyes (1997)	A Fire Inside EP (1998)

Shut Your Mouth and Open Your Eyes is the third studio album by American punk rock band AFI. It was released on November 11, 1997, through Nitro Records.

== Overview ==
This is the first album to feature bassist Hunter Burgan, although he was not a permanent member of AFI at the time, as well as the final album to feature founding guitarist Mark Stopholese. Burgan was offered about $500 to play on the album, but he successfully suggested $666.

Nick 13 from American psychobilly band Tiger Army performs vocals on the chorus of "A Single Second". The album includes a cover of "Today's Lesson" by punk band Filth, and the vinyl edition also includes a cover of "Last Caress" by the Misfits.

Additionally, future band member Jade Puget performed backing vocals for the album, making it the first to feature AFI's current lineup. It is the first album to be copyrighted to A Fire Inside, the band's full moniker, and the phrase is sung in the introductory track, "Keeping Out of Direct Sunlight".

A music video for "Third Season" was directed by Darren Doane and Ken Daurio. It features the band sitting in a suburban town while a slew of children chase an ice cream truck. Besides this song, references to the number three are made in the names of three other tracks: "Three Reasons", "Three Seconds Notice", and "Triple Zero".

== Artwork ==
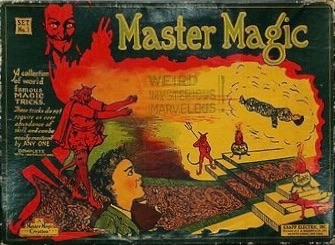
The magic set the artwork was composited from

The album art was largely composited from a 1929 children's magic set. The band name appears in a Roman font, while the album title is italicized and stylized in lower case except the first letter of the first word. The black, yellow and reddish cover features the head and shoulders of a young man wearing a suit, a patterned red carpet over three stairs, above which a figure levitates between a pair of potted flames. At the bottom corner is a small crawling red devil.

Two red devils appear in the liner notes (one a human wearing a cape which also appears on the back cover). Beneath the lyrics are silhouettes of raised hands. A maniacally smiling man-devil's face appears on the red-and-black CD label. The inner edge of the album's CD case reveals the hidden message "a fire inside". Behind the CD tray is an achromatic illustration of a man in suit and shorts, illuminated in white, twisting a skeleton key to a huge lock, which has been keeping some dark doorway shut.

== Reception ==
Professional ratings
Review scores
Source	Rating
Alternative Press	4/5 stars
Punknews.org	4/5 stars
The Rolling Stone Album Guide	2.5/5 stars

== Track listing ==
All lyrics are written by Davey Havok; all music is composed by Mark Stopholese and Adam Carson, except where noted.

Standard edition
No.	Title	Writer(s)	Length
1.	"Keeping Out of Direct Sunlight (an introduction)"		0:58
2.	"Three Reasons"		1:33
3.	"A Single Second"		2:12
4.	"pH Low"		1:42
5.	"Let It Be Broke"		2:06
6.	"Third Season"		2:48
7.	"Lower Your Head and Take It in the Body"		1:46
8.	"Coin Return"		2:33
9.	"The New Patron Saints and Angels"		2:17
10.	"Three Seconds Notice"		1:35
11.	"Salt for Your Wounds"		2:24
12.	"Today's Lesson"	Filth	2:14
13.	"The Devil Loves You"		1:30
14.	"Triple Zero"		2:50
Total length:			28:26

Vinyl bonus track
No.	Title	Writer(s)	Length
15.	"Last Caress"	Glenn Danzig	2:00

Japanese bonus tracks
No.	Title	Lyrics	Music	Length
15.	"Self-Pity"	Mark; Dave	Stopholese	0:56
16.	"Key Lime Pie"	Carson	Carson	0:37
Total length:				30:26

== Personnel ==
Credits adapted from liner notes.

AFI

- Davey Havok – lead vocals
- Adam Carson – drums, backing vocals
- Mark Stopholese – guitar, backing vocals

Additional performers

- Hunter Burgan – bass, backing vocals
- Nick 13 – backing vocals; harmony vocals on "A Single Second"
- Jade Puget – backing vocals

Technical personnel

- AFI – producer
- Andy Ernst – engineer
- Eddy Shreyer – mastering

Studios

- Recorded at Art of Ears, Hayward, CA
- Mastered at Oasis
