= Andy Ernst =

American musician

Andy "Andro" Ernst is a music producer, engineer, musician, and songwriter from San Francisco. Artists he has worked with include: Green Day, AFI, Sway & King Tech, Rancid, Tiger Army, The Nerve Agents, Malo, Link 80, Screeching Weasel, Swingin' Utters, Screw 32, Good Riddance, Fury 66, Shock G and Money B. The majority of his work has been punk rock. Ernst owns and operates the Art of Ears Studio in Hayward, California, previously located in San Francisco.

== Partial production discography ==
- Sass- I Only Wanted to Love You / Do It (Single) (20th Century) (1976)
- Andro & Ross- Should’ve Known Better / You're My Girl (12”) (Bogart) (1989)
- Green Day- 1,000 Hours (EP)(Lookout)(1989)
- Green Day- 39/Smooth (Lookout) (1990)
- Green Day- Slappy (EP) (Lookout) (1990)
- Mc Sway & Dj King Tech- Follow 4 Now (All City) (1990)
- David Diebold & Kim Cataluna- White Rabbit (Megatone) (1990)
- Sway & King Tech- Concrete Jungle (Giant) (1991)
- Green Day- 1,039 / Smoothed Out Slappy Hours (Lookout) (1991)
- Screeching Weasel- My Brain Hurts (Lookout) (1991)
- Rancid- Rancid (EP) (Lookout) (1992)
- Fifteen- Swain's First Bike Ride (Lookout) (1992)
- Green Day- Kerplunk (Lookout) (1992)
- Screeching Weasel- Anthem for a New Tomorrow (Lookout) (1993)
- Nuisance- Sunny Side Down (Lookout) (1993)
- Big Rig- Expansive Heart (EP) (Lookout) (1994)
- Swingin' Utters- The Streets of San Francisco (New Red Archives) (1994)
- Wynona Riders- J.D. Salinger (Lookout) (1995)
- Screw 32- Unresolved Childhood Issues (Wingnut) (1995)
- Screeching Weasel- Kill the Musicians (Lookout) (1995)
- AFI- Answer That and Stay Fashionable (Wingnut) (1995)
- The Hi-Fives-Welcome to my Mind (Lookout) (1995)
- The B.U.M.S.- Lyfe’ n’ Tyme (Priority) (1995)
- Malo- Senorita (Crescendo) (1995)
- Go Sailor- Go Sailor (Lookout) (199?)
- Good Riddance / Ignite (EP) (Revelation) (1996)
- AFI-Shut Your Mouth and Open Your Eyes (Nitro) (1997)
- Link 80- 17 Reasons (Asian Man) (1997)
- The Hi-Fives- And a Whole Lotta You (Lookout) (1997)
- The Force (band)- I Don't Like You Either (Spider Club) (1997)
- Hayride to Hell- Hayride to Hell (Nervous) (1997)
- Redemption 87- All Guns Poolside (1998)
- West African Highlife Band- Salute to Highlife Pioneers (Inner Spirit) (1998)
- Tiger Army- Tiger Army (Hellcat) (1998)
- Fred Ross- Dignity (Strokeland) (1998)
- AFI- A Fire Inside (EP) (Adeline) (1998)
- Bottomdawg- Bound By Circumstance (1998)
- 78 RPM- Dill Records (1998)
- AFI- All Hallow's EP (EP) (Nitro) (1999)
- AFI- Black Sails in the Sunset (Nitro) (1999)
- Sick Of Change- In Our Time Of Need (Bettie Rocket Records) (1999)
- Link 80- The Struggle Continues (Asian Man) (1999)
- The Missing 23rd- ctrl+alt+del (Sessions) (2000)
- The Nerve Agents- Days Of The White Owl (Revelation) (2000)
- The V-Town Have-Nots- Self-Untitled (2000)
- The Nerve Agents- The Butterfly Collection (Hellcat) (2001)
- AFI- The Art of Drowning (Nitro) (2000)
- Prosper- Brevity of Man's Days (Bettie Rocket Records) (2000)
- Tiger Army- (Hellcat) (2001)
- Groovie Ghoulies- Freaks On Parade (Stardumb) (2001)
- Pipedown- Enemies of Progress (AF) (2001)
- Fury 66- Red Giant Evolution (Sessions) (2001)
- Jet Lag- Lonely Kings (Sessions) (2001)
- Tilt- Been Where? Did What? (Fat Wreck Chords) (2001)
- Nigerian Brothers- Sons from the Village (Inner Spirit) (2001)
- Diabolical Exploits- Diabolical Exploits (Substandard) (2001)
- Dexter Danger - It's Not Pretty Being Easy EP (2002)
- Dexter Danger - Forever Broken (2002)
- Pipedown- Mental Weaponry (AF) (2003)
- Said Radio- Tidal Waves and Teeth (Mankind) (2007)
- Set Off- Just Please Stop Sceaming (Felony) (2007)
- Set Off- Constructive Instability Vol. 1 (2009)
- Batching It- Homage (2009)
