= A Fire Inside EP =

EP by AFI
- Released: August 14, 1998
- Studio: Art of Ears, Hayward, California
- Genre: Hardcore punk, horror punk
- Length: 9:32
- Label: Adeline
- Producer: AFI

AFI chronology
Shut Your Mouth and Open Your Eyes (1997)	A Fire Inside EP (1998)	Black Sails EP (1999)

Professional ratings
Review scores
Source	Rating
Punknews.org	3.5/5 stars
The Rolling Stone Album Guide	1.5/5 stars

A Fire Inside EP is an extended play by American rock band AFI. It was released on August 14, 1998, through Adeline Records. The EP is titled after the band's full moniker, first revealed with their previous album, Shut Your Mouth and Open Your Eyes. The release includes two original songs and two covers. It is the first release to mention Hunter Burgan as a permanent member, and the last to feature founding guitarist Mark Stopholese.

In November 2010, Adeline Records released a special-edition pressing on purple vinyl, limited to 500 copies.

== Track listing ==
All tracks are written by AFI, except where noted.

No.	Title	Writer(s)	Length
1.	"3½"		2:22
2.	"Over Exposure"		2:03
3.	"The Hanging Garden" (The Cure cover)	R. Smith; Gallup; Tolhurst	4:21
4.	"Demonomania" (Misfits cover)	Glenn Danzig	0:46

== Personnel ==
Credits adapted from liner notes.

- AFI – producer
- Joe Brook – band photos
- Hunter Burgan – bass
- Adam Carson – drums
- Andy Earnst – recording, mixing
- Tedd Francis – lyric art
- Davey Havok – vocals
- John Joh – re-design (2003 re-release)
- Markus Stopholese – guitar
- Luke Ogden – fire photo
- Jamie Reilly – layout
- Jim Thiebaud – layout

Studios

- Recorded at The Art of Ears, Hayward, CA
- Mastered at Oceanview Digital Mastering, LA, CA
