= Geoff Kresge =

- Genres: Street punk; hardcore punk; punk rock; psychobilly
- Occupations: Musician; songwriter; record producer
- Instruments: Guitar; bass; upright bass
- Years active: 1992–present
- Labels: Key Lime Pie; Dead Body

Geoff Kresge is a songwriter, guitarist, bassist, and record producer.

== Career ==
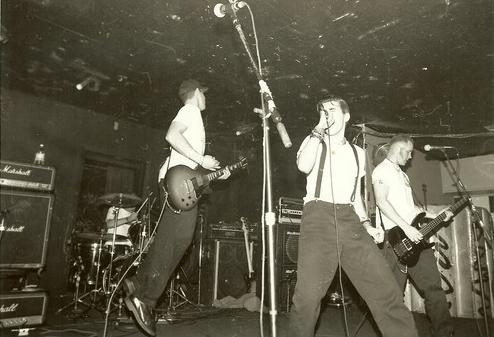
Kresge [far right] in 1995.

Kresge played with the punk group AFI during their early career, from 1992 through 1997, and co-wrote the majority of their early material alongside frontman Davey Havok. During an AFI hiatus in 1993, he briefly moved to New York to join street punk band Blanks 77. He later went on to play with Canadian horror rock group The Forbidden Dimension and also a high-energy rock band, The Daggers.

Kresge joined psychobilly band Tiger Army in 1999 just as the band became a full-time touring band, hitting the road in support of their debut album though he played an electric bass in his previous bands, the upright bass is used for Tiger Army's music. He appeared as standup bassist on the band's next two full-length albums, Tiger Army II: Power of Moonlite and Tiger Army III: Ghost Tigers Rise, and in each of the videos from those records. In September 2004 he announced his departure from Tiger Army. He co-founded the band Viva Hate with longtime friend Matt "Wedge" Wedgley (formerly of The Force) and joined the HorrorPops on guitar, not long afterward. He co-wrote and played guitar on the band's second album, Bring It On!.

In July 2007, Kresge announced that he had left HorrorPops and disbanded Dead Body Records, stating that he wished to dedicate full attention to Viva Hate, which was followed by an American tour in support of Sick of it All and Madball.

Tiger Army's official website announced Kresge's return to the band in January 2008.

In February 2014, Kresge announced he would be leaving Tiger Army for the second and final time via a statement on his Facebook page. He stated that "Tiger Army has been off the road since the end of 2008 and has not released an album since the year before. The fans all around the world have been hungry for new music and tour announcements for the past five years. I’ve finally accepted that if I want to remain a full-time musician, it’s time for me to move on."

From 2018 to 2023, Kresge played bass for Californian hardcore punk band, Fear.

== Discography ==
=== With AFI ===
- Dork 7-inch EP (1993, Key Lime Pie Records)
- Behind the Times 7-inch EP (1993, Key Lime Pie Records)
- Eddie Picnic's All Wet live 7-inch EP (1994, Key Lime Pie Records)
- This Is Berkeley, Not West Bay 7-inch EP (1994, Zafio Records)
- Fly in the Ointment 7-inch (1995, Wedge Records)
- Bombing the Bay split 7-inch with Swingin' Utters (1995, Sessions Records)
  - featuring AFI's cover of "Values Here," by Dag Nasty
- AFI/Heckle Split "7" with Heckle (late 1995, Wingnut Records)
- Answer That and Stay Fashionable (1995, Wingnut Records; re-released in 1997 on Nitro Records)
- Very Proud of Ya (1996, Nitro Records)
- Sing the Sorrow (background vocals) (2003, DreamWorks Records)

=== With Blanks 77 ===
- Shut Up And Pogo (1993, Self-Released)

=== With The Daggers ===
- She Told Me She Said 7-inch vinyl (1998, Sloth Records)
- Right Between the Eyes (2002, Sloth Records)

=== With Tiger Army ===
- Temptation EP (Featured as producer) (1997, Chapter Eleven Records)
- Tiger Army II: Power of Moonlite (2001, Hellcat Records)
- Early Years EP (Background vocals) (2002, Hellcat Records)
- Ghost Tigers EP "10" (2004, Hellcat Records)
- Tiger Army III: Ghost Tigers Rise (2004, Hellcat Records)
- Rose Of The Devil's Garden "7" (2006, Hellcat Records)
- Music from Regions Beyond (Background vocals) (2007, Hellcat Records)

Compilation appearances

- Give 'Em the Boot III (2002, Hellcat Records)
  - Track 13 – "Power of Moonlite"
- Give 'Em the Boot IV (2004, Hellcat Records)
  - Track 03 – "Atomic"
- Give 'Em the Boot V (2006, Hellcat Records)
  - Track 04 – "Swift Silent Deadly"
- Nightmare Revisited (2008, Disney)
  - Bonus Track - "Ooogie Boogie's Song" (Backing Vocals)

=== With HorrorPops ===
- Bring It On! (2005, Hellcat Records)

=== With Viva Hate ===
- Hateful and Hollow Demo CD (2007, self-released)
- Save Me 7-inch EP (2008, Black Cat Records)
- Goodnight My Love (EP) 7-inch EP (2010, Black Cat Records)

=== Other ===
- Heckle - We're Not Laughing With You (Co-Producer, Backing Vocals) (Wingnut Records, 1996)
- The Force - "I Don’t Like You Either" (Co-Writer on "Star Destroyer", Backing Vocals) (Spider Club Music, 1997)
- Nekromantix – Brought Back to Life Again (Digital Editing) (2005)
- 12 Step Rebels – Go Go Graveyard Rockin' with 12 Step Rebels (Featured as producer) (2005) Dead Body Records
- Graveyard Shift – Rest Without Peace (Featured as producer) (2005) Dead Body Records
- Mr. Cliff Greenwood – Musical Heritage (Digital Editing) (2006) Dead Body Records
