= Phoenix Theater =

All-ages nightclub in Petaluma, California

The Phoenix Theater

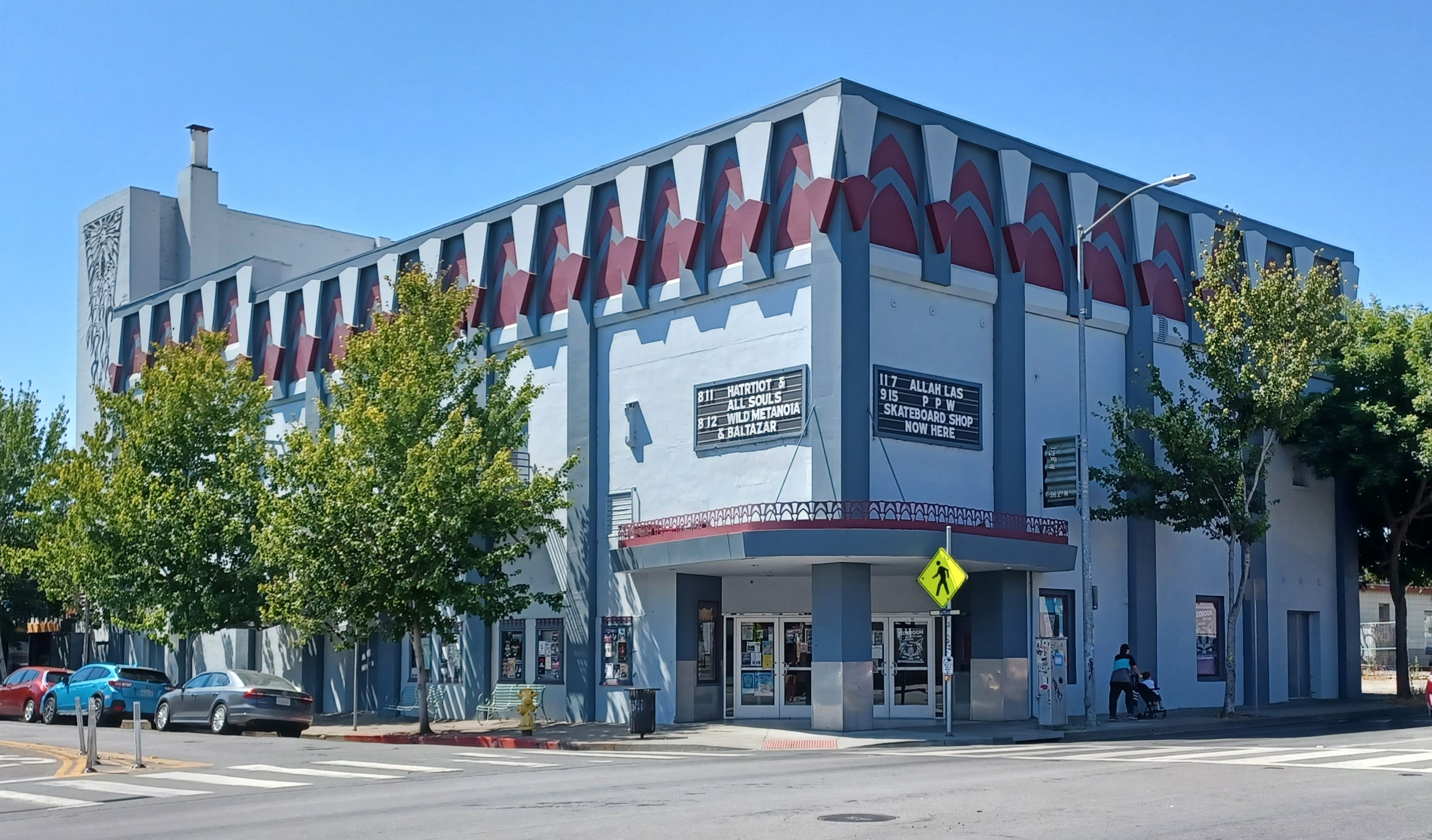
- Interactive map of The Phoenix Theater
- Former names: Hill Opera House; California Theater; Showcase Theater
- Address: 201 Washington St; Petaluma, CA
- Coordinates: 38°14′6″N 122°38′35″W
- Owner: Petaluma Phoenix Center, Inc.
- Operator: Tom Gaffey
- Capacity: 720
- Type: Live music venue
- Events: music, concerts, theater, youth center and education

Construction
- Built: 1896
- Opened: December 4, 1905; 120 years ago
- Renovated: 1924 (fire); August 5, 1957 (fire)
- Expanded: 1982 (addition of live concerts)
- Architect: Josie F. Hill

Website
- The Phoenix Theater

The Phoenix Theater is an all-ages nightclub located in Petaluma, California. The club has been in existence since 1905 and has changed in both structure and purpose, mostly due to severe damage caused by several fires.

== History ==
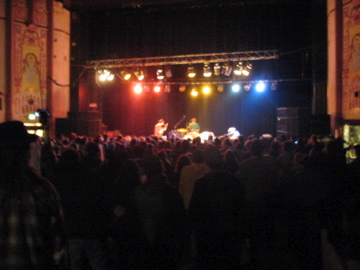
A large crowd watches Deerhoof at the Phoenix Theater in Petaluma.

The Phoenix Theater first opened in 1905 as the Hill Opera House, a small town opera house. In the early 1920s, it was nearly destroyed by a fire forcing the theater to be shut down. By 1925, it had been restored and opened as a movie theater. The building was purchased by California Movie Theater around 1935 and renamed California Theater.

On August 5, 1957, another fire took the roof of the building. The building was restored and renamed the Showcase Theater by the Tocchini family and soon after the first live concert was put on at the theater by Petaluma native Jeff Dorenfeld. The Tocchinis employed a boy named Tom Gaffey, who managed to be rehired by Ken Frankel after Frankel bought the theater in 1982. Gaffey was then named theater manager and he renamed the theater after the mythological phoenix because the building seemed to "rise from the ashes."

The theater gained unwanted attention after a late-night performance by the band Popsicle Love Sponge performed a questionable act with the body of what was believed to be a dead chicken. The late-night shows ended, but the movies continued for a short time.

In 1989, the Loma Prieta earthquake caused moderate damage to the theater's interior, resulting in long-awaited renovations.

In the late 1990s, the theater's landlord announced plans to sell the Phoenix Theater for demolition and reconstruction as an office building, despite public opposition. The sale was in escrow when four employees from Cerent Corporation, all of whom were musicians and two of whom were former Phoenix Theater frequenters, intervened and took over the escrow. With other leading local citizens, they established the non-profit Petaluma Phoenix Center, Inc., to not only own The Phoenix Theater, but also to preserve and expand the services that the Phoenix provides to its community.

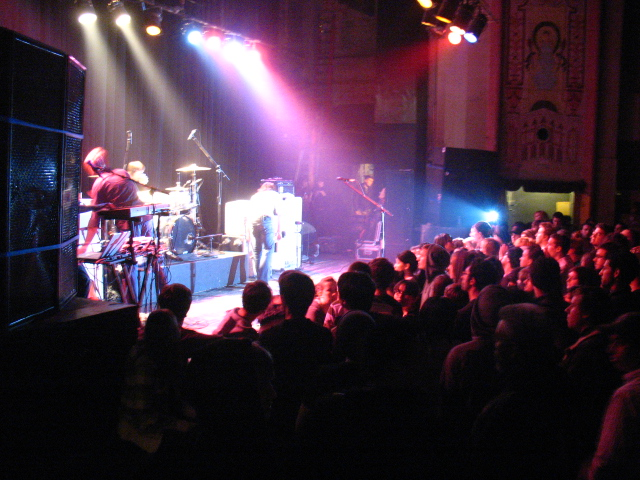
A crowd watches Portugal. The Man perform at the Phoenix Theatre in Petaluma in 2008

Many famous rock bands and performers have played The Phoenix Theatre on their way to stardom, including The Ramones, Green Day, Red Hot Chili Peppers, Metallica, Primus, Sublime, and Pennywise. Bradley Nowell, the lead singer of Sublime, played his last show with the band at The Phoenix Theatre on May 24, 1996. The next morning, he was found dead of a heroin overdose in his room at a San Francisco hotel. Neutral Milk Hotel played their last concert at The Phoenix Theater in 2015.
