= Alan Forbes =

Alan Forbes is an artist who lives in San Francisco, California. He was born in Connecticut in 1968. He is known for creating the logo for The Black Crowes. He has done posters for The Chris Robinson Brotherhood, Howlin Rain, Queens of the Stone Age, Roky Erickson, Boneback and many others. He has also done album art for The Offspring, AFI and Goldfinger.
