= Answer That and Stay Fashionable =

Studio album by AFI
- Released: July 4, 1995
- Studio: Art of Ears, Hayward, California
- Genre: Hardcore punk
- Length: 28:21
- Label: Wingnut
- Producer: AFI

AFI chronology
Fly in the Ointment (1995)	Answer That and Stay Fashionable (1995)	Very Proud of Ya (1996)

Professional ratings
Review scores
Source	Rating
AllMusic	2/5 stars
Alternative Press	3.5/5 stars
The Rolling Stone Album Guide	2/5 stars

Answer That and Stay Fashionable is the debut studio album by American punk rock band AFI. It was released on July 4, 1995, through Wingnut Records and rereleased on April 22, 1997, through Nitro Records.

== Background ==
Answer That and Stay Fashionable was recorded in Hayward, California, at Art of Ears, the studio of Andy Ernst, in 1995. The album was produced by AFI, along with Doug Sangalang, Tim Armstrong and Brett Reed. It was recorded in under a week.

All of the tracks except "Open Your Eyes" are copyrighted to Anthems for Insubordinates.

The album originally included a hidden track, a cover of The Police's "Man in a Suitcase", which is absent on the rerelease. In its place is a cover of The Circus Tents' "Open Your Eyes", originally released with an alternate mix on the Fly in the Ointment EP in 1995.

Many audio samples are included throughout the album, such as a clip from Reservoir Dogs (1992), whose theatrical release poster the cover artwork parodies. Also featured is a clip from The Comic Strip episode "Bad News Tour", from which the album derives its name, and National Lampoon's European Vacation (1985).

The tracks "Two of a Kind" and "Yürf Rendenmein" were later re-recorded for AFI's second album Very Proud of Ya.

== Track listing ==
All lyrics are written by Davey Havok; all music is composed by Geoff Kresge, except where noted.

Standard edition
No.	Title	Lyrics	Music	Length
1.	"Two of a Kind"			1:31
2.	"Half-Empty Bottle"	Kresge		1:39
3.	"Yürf Rendenmein"		Kresge; Havok	2:14
4.	"I Wanna Get a Mohawk (But Mom Won't Let Me Get One)"			1:12
5.	"Brownie Bottom Sundae"			1:47
6.	"The Checkered Demon"		Mark Stopholese; Kresge	2:08
7.	"Cereal Wars"			1:17
8.	"The Mother in Me"	Kresge; Havok		2:06
9.	"Rizzo in the Box"	Havok; Adam Carson		1:50
10.	"Kung-Fu Devil"		Stopholese	2:15
11.	"Your Name Here"	Kresge		2:28
12.	"Ny-Quil"			2:07
13.	"Don't Make Me Ill"	Kresge; Havok		2:41
14.	"High School Football Hero"	Kresge		1:53
15.	"Man in a Suitcase" (The Police cover; hidden track)	Sting	Sting	3:13
Total length:				28:21

Vinyl-only tracks
No.	Title	Lyrics	Music	Length
15.	"Self-Pity"	Stopholese; Havok	Stopholese
16.	"Key Lime Pie"	Carson	Carson

Re-release
No.	Title	Lyrics	Music	Length
14.	"Open Your Eyes" (The Circus Tents cover)	Matt Wedgley	The Circus Tents	1:16
15.	"High School Football Hero"	Kresge		1:55

Re-release vinyl-only tracks
No.	Title	Lyrics	Music	Length
16.	"Self-Pity"	Stopholese; Havok	Stopholese	0:56
17.	"Key Lime Pie"	Carson	Carson	0:37

== Personnel ==
Credits adapted from liner notes.

AFI

- Markus Stopholese – guitars
- Adam Carson – drums
- Davey Havok – lead vocals
- Geoff Kresge – bass, vocals

Additional personnel

- AFI – producer
- Doug Sangalang – co-producer (all except 2 & 11)
- Tim Armstrong – co-producer (tracks 2 & 11)
- Brett Reed – co-producer (tracks 2 & 11)
- Andy Ernst – recording
- George Horn – mastering
- Steve Z – photography

Studios

- Recorded at Art of Ears, Hayward, CA
- Mastered at Fantasy Studios, Berkeley, CA
