= Hunter Burgan =

American musician (born 1976)

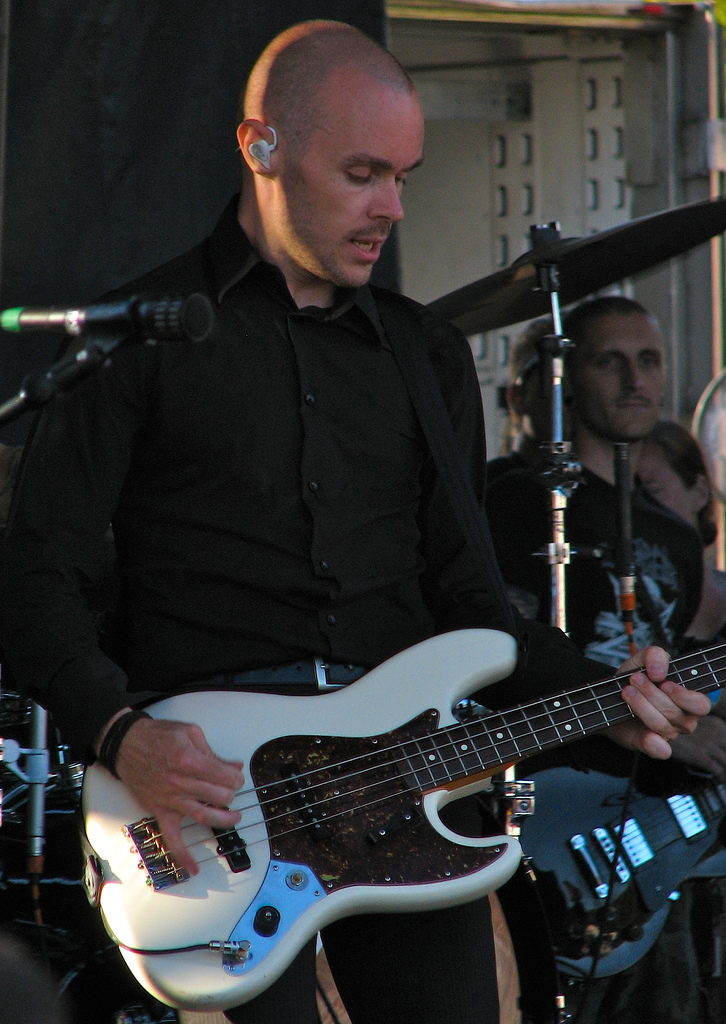
- Burgan performing in 2006

Background information
- Also known as: Hunter
- Born: Hunter Burgan; May 14, 1976 (age 50)
- Origin: Grass Valley, California, U.S.
- Genres: Alternative rock; punk rock; hardcore punk; R&B
- Occupation: Musician
- Instruments: Bass; guitar; drums; piano; saxophone
- Years active: 1991–present
- Label: Checkmate Records

Hunter Burgan (born May 14, 1976) is an American multi-instrumentalist. He is the second and current bassist of AFI.

== Biography ==
Burgan grew up in Grass Valley, California. He is a vegan.

== Career ==
Burgan was bassist in The Force when joining Ukiah, California-based rock band AFI, meant as a temporary replacement for regular bassist, Geoff Kresge, for touring and a record, Shut Your Mouth and Open Your Eyes, but eventually became AFI's full-time bassist in November 1997. The Force broke up in September 1998.

Burgan loves Prince's music and even had his own side-project called Hunter Revenge dedicated to singing early-80s-style R&B. A talented multi-instrumentalist, Burgan can play drums, bass, guitar, saxophone, clarinet, and piano. He was the drummer and one of the founding members of the Frisk, who played their final show in December 2005. He was the drummer of the Nevada City, California, band, Badical Turbo Radness (BTR) in the mid 1990s. He has also played drums for the Eyeliners, Gardening, Not Architecture, F-Minus (one show), and the Halo Friendlies on tour.

Hunter was featured on Tegan and Sara's 2007 album, The Con, playing bass on the songs written by Tegan. He appeared with them on Late Night with Conan O'Brien playing the shakers on the song "Back in Your Head." He has also confirmed an upcoming side project with Tegan, and contributed lyrics to three of her songs on the 2009 album Sainthood. He also played bass on Golden Shoulders's "Little Nixon," from their 2009 album Get Reasonable.

He is often referred to simply as "Hunter," as his last name is never given in the list of band members on AFI's albums, with the exception of Crash Love. He plays Fender American Jazz Basses and Ampeg Amps.

In May 2011, when asked why he had stopped recording with his Hunter Revenge project, Burgan stated "I had a lot of fun writing songs in a very specific style. However that is not the only style of music I want to write and can write." He also noted "I'm doing a lot of other music stuff now that's in different styles that are at least a little of a better representation of what I want to do musically."

Burgan joined Alkaline Trio's Matt Skiba and My Chemical Romance's Jarrod Alexander to form Matt Skiba and the Sekrets, which released their debut album Babylon on May 8, 2012.

== Discography ==
=== With the Force ===
- Fettish EP (1996)
- I Don't Like You Either (1997)
- Split EP with the Traitors (1998)
- Complete Discography (2008)

=== With Badical Turbo Radness ===
- To the Rescue (1997)

=== With AFI ===
- Shut Your Mouth and Open Your Eyes (1997)
- A Fire Inside EP (1998)
- Black Sails EP (1999)
- Black Sails in the Sunset (1999)
- All Hallow's EP (1999)
- The Art of Drowning (2000)
- 336 (2002)
- Sing the Sorrow (2003)
- Decemberunderground (2006)
- Crash Love (2009)
- Burials (2013)
- AFI (2017)
- Missing Man EP (2018)
- Bodies (2021)
- Silver Bleeds the Black Sun... (2025)

=== With the Frisk ===
- Rank Restraint (2001)
- Audio Ransom Note (2003)

=== With Hunter Revenge ===
- Hunter Revenge (2001)

=== With Tegan and Sara ===
- The Con (2007)
- Sainthood (2009)

=== With Dan and Hunter ===
- Dan & Hunter's Holiday EP Volume One (2008)

=== With Matt Skiba and the Sekrets ===
- "Babylon" (2012)
- "Haven't You?" (EP) (2012)
- "Kuts" (2015)

== Comics ==
Burgan illustrates and writes for the comic series Cat With Matches.
