= Very Proud of Ya =

Studio album by AFI
- Released: June 18, 1996
- Studio: T.M.L. Studios, Hayward, California
- Genre: Hardcore punk
- Length: 39:43
- Label: Nitro
- Producer: AFI; Michael Rosen

AFI chronology
Answer That and Stay Fashionable (1995)	Very Proud of Ya (1996)	Shut Your Mouth and Open Your Eyes (1997)

Professional ratings
Review scores
Source	Rating
AllMusic	2/5 stars
Alternative Press	3.5/5 stars
Punknews.org	4.5/5 stars
The Rolling Stone Album Guide	1.5/5 stars

Very Proud of Ya is the second studio album by American rock band AFI. It was released on June 18, 1996, through Nitro Records.

== Background ==
The liner notes of the album state that all the tracks are copyrighted to Anthems for Insubordinates, while the mailing address states the band's name as Asking for It. It is the last album to feature bassist Geoff Kresge, who illustrated the album cover as well. The album features future band member Jade Puget performing back-up vocals. It was recorded in about a week.

In a 2010 interview, Kresge mentioned that several additional songs and guitar solos were omitted due to time constraints, as a result the band re-recorded several songs that had been previously released.

The tracks "Two of a Kind" and "Yürf Rendenmein" were re-recorded from their debut album Answer That and Stay Fashionable. The title of "Love Is a Many Splendored Thing" is a reference to the song of the same name by Sammy Fain and Paul Francis Webster, although it is not a cover.

A music video, the band's first, was made for "He Who Laughs Last..." Directed by Darren Doane and Ken Daurio, it draws inspiration from the film Goodfellas (1990).

The songs "Cruise Control" and "Love Is a Many Splendored Thing" were used in the 1996 independent film Mary Jane's Not a Virgin Anymore, which was first screened in 1997 and also features Havok in a small role.

== Track listing ==
All lyrics are written by Davey Havok; all music is composed by Geoff Kresge, except where noted.

Standard edition
No.	Title	Lyrics	Music	Length
0.	"No-Dave Party" (pregap track)			1:39
1.	"He Who Laughs Last..."			1:50
2.	"File 13"			1:48
3.	"Wake-Up Call"	Kresge	Stopholese	1:42
4.	"Cult Status"			1:57
5.	"Perfect Fit"		Stopholese	1:58
6.	"Advances in Modern Technology"			1:40
7.	"Theory of Revolution"			1:32
8.	"This Secret Ninja"	Havok; Kresge		2:20
9.	"Soap-Box Derby"		Stopholese	2:25
10.	"Aspirin Free"		Stopholese	2:45
11.	"Fishbowl"			1:51
12.	"Charles Atlas"		Stopholese	2:22
13.	"Crop Tub"		Stopholese	1:50
14.	"Consult My Lover"			1:35
15.	"Take the Test"			1:46
16.	"Two of a Kind"			1:35
17.	"Shatty Fatmas"			1:46
18.	"Yürf Rendenmein"		Kresge; Havok	2:12
19.	"Cruise Control"	Havok; Kresge		1:11
20.	"Modern Epic"	Kresge; Havok		1:47
Total length:				39:45

Vinyl bonus tracks
No.	Title	Lyrics	Music	Length
21.	"Who Said You Could Touch Me?"			1:24
22.	"Rolling Balls"		Stopholese	2:22
23.	"Love Is a Many-Splendored Thing"	Kresge		1:33

== Personnel ==
Credits adapted from liner notes.

AFI

- Davey Havok – lead vocals
- Adam Carson – drums
- Geoff Kresge – bass, vocals, cover drawing
- Mark Stopholese – guitar, backing vocals

Additional personnel

- AFI – producer
- Tom Audisio – band photo
- Paul Marchand – additional guitar (pregap track)
- Rockabilly Nick 13 – backing vocals
- Dayton Paiva – live shots
- BJ Papas – live shots
- Jade "The Playah" Puget – backing vocals
- Michael Rosen – producer, engineer
- Eddie Shreyer – mastering
- Winni Wintermeyer – design

Studios

- Recorded at T.M.L. Studios, Hayward, CA
- Mastered at Future Disc
