= Bleeding Through discography =

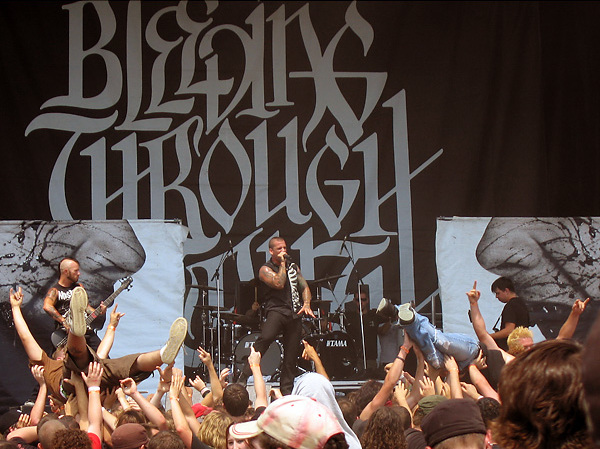
- Bleeding Through performing in 2006
- Studio albums: 8
- EPs: 1
- Demo albums: 1
- Video albums: 2
- Music videos: 14

The American metalcore band Bleeding Through have released eight studio albums, one extended play, one demo album, two video albums and 14 music videos. As of 2024, the band have sold more than 400,000 albums worldwide.

== Albums ==
=== Studio albums ===
Title	Album details	Chart peaks				Sales
Title	Album details	US	US Indie	AUS	UK	Sales
Dust to Ashes	Released: March 20, 2001; Label: Prime Directive; Format: CD	—	—	—	—	
Portrait of the Goddess	Released: April 30, 2002; Label: Indecision; Format: CD, LP	—	—	—	—	
This Is Love, This Is Murderous	Released: September 23, 2003; Label: Trustkill; Format: CD, LP	—	43	—	—	US: 150,000
The Truth	Released: January 10, 2006; Label: Trustkill; Format: CD, CD+DVD	48	1	—	153	US: 100,000
Declaration	Released: September 30, 2008; Label: Trustkill; Format: CD, LP	104	16	74	—	US: 25,000+
Bleeding Through	Released: April 13, 2010; Label: Rise; Format: CD, LP	143	21	—	—	
The Great Fire	Released: January 31, 2012; Label: Rise; Format: CD, LP	193	23	—	—	
Love Will Kill All	Released: May 25, 2018; Label: SharpTone; Format: CD, LP	—	10	—	—	
Nine	Released: February 14, 2025; Label: SharpTone; Format: CD, LP	—	—	—	—	
"—" denotes a recording that did not chart or was not released in that territory

=== Demo albums ===
Title	Details
Bleeding Through	Released: 2000; Label: Self-released; Format: CD, CS

== Extended plays ==
Title	EP details
Rage	Released: July 1, 2022; Label: SharpTone; Format: DD

== Video albums ==
List of video albums, with selected details
Title	Album details
This Is Live, This Is Murderous	Released: June 15, 2004; Label: Kung Fu; Format: DVD
Wolves Among Sheep	Released: November 15, 2005; Label: Trustkill; Format: DVD

== Music videos ==
Year	Song	Director
2002	"Our Enemies"	
2003	"Love Lost in a Hale of Gunfire"	Christopher Sims
2003	"On Wings of Lead"	Chad Calek and Corey Moss
2006	"Kill to Believe"	Fort Awesome
2006	"Love in Slow Motion"	Fort Awesome
2007	"Line in the Sand"	Dan Dobi
2008	"Death Anxiety"	Dave Brodsky
2009	"Germany"	Ignore Entertainment
2010	"Anti-Hero"	Spence Nicholson
2018	"Set Me Free"	Orie and Enlighten Creative
2018	"Fade into the Ash"	
2018	"No Friends"	
2024	"Our Brand Is Chaos"	
2024	"Dead But So Alive"	Vincente Cordero

== Appearance on compilations ==
- MTV2 Headbangers Ball: The Revenge – "Kill to Believe"
- The Best of Taste of Chaos – "On Wings of Lead"
- The Best of Taste of Chaos Two. – "Love in Slow Motion"
- Bring You to Your Knees: A Tribute to Guns N' Roses – "Rocket Queen"
- Threat: Music That Inspired the Movie – "Number Seven with a Bullet"
- Threat: Original Motion Picture Soundtrack (Soundtrack) – "Number Seven with a Bullet"
- AMP Magazine Presents: Volume 1: Hardcore
- Blood, Sweat & Ten Years – "On Wings of Lead" and "Love Lost in a Hale of Gunfire"
- MTV2 Headbangers Ball, Vol. 2 – "Love Lost in a Hail of Gunfire" (censored)
- Fighting Music 2
- Our Impact Will Be Felt: A Tribute to Sick of It All – "We Want the Truth"
- Trustkill Takeover, Vol. II – "One Last Second"
- 2005 Warped Tour Compilation – "Love Lost in a Hail of Gunfire"
- Punk Goes '90s – "Stars" – Hum cover
- Black on Black: A Tribute to Black Flag – "My War"
- Metal Hammer 204 – "Anti-Hero"
