= Kill to Believe =

Single by Bleeding Through

from the album The Truth
- Released: August 1, 2006
- Recorded: 2005
- Studio: Room of Doom, Irvine, California
- Genre: Metalcore
- Length: 3:57
- Label: Trustkill; Roadrunner
- Songwriter: Bleeding Through
- Producer: Rob Caggiano

Bleeding Through singles chronology
"Love in Slow Motion" (2006)	"Kill to Believe" (2006)	"Line in the Sand" (2007)

"Kill to Believe" is a single by Orange County metalcore band Bleeding Through released in 2006 by Trustkill Records. It is the second from their 2006 album The Truth.

Bassist Ryan Wombacher has stated that this is his favorite song off the album because "it shows both sides of... we're still sticking with what we sound like but I think that's the song that it's gonna kind of tell what BT is gonna come to be in the next five more years. Yeah, it's a little more mainstream but we still have the heavy parts and the more metal parts. And then, Brandan gets to show more of his singing vocals which he’s gotten a lot better at I think personally in the last three years."

== Music video ==
A music video was shot for the song, directed by Zach Merck and Kevin Leonard and filmed in the California desert. It is part one of a two-part, story-based video, the second part being the music video for "Love in Slow Motion". As frontman Brandan Schieppati said, it is "a sort of Texas Chainsaw Massacre meets The Devil's Rejects", interlaced with performance footage of the band.

The video opens with two sinister backwoods brothers driving in the California desert, talking about what to do with the box that lies in the back of their flatbed truck. They finally decide to sink it to the bottom of the river. Then a flashback shows vocalist Brandan Schieppati and his on-screen bride, actress Susannah Mills, breaking down in front of a diner that includes patrons chained to their tables. Keyboardist Marta Peterson plays a knife-wielding psychotic waitress, and her two brothers, the ones seen at the beginning of the video, are also there. Brandan is then overpowered by the backwoods sadists. At the end, the truck is shown again and the box falls off the back. Apparently, Brandan was in it, because we see him escape. The final scene shows him, gleaming two-foot tire jack in hand, going back into the diner to save his bride from the sinister clutches of the villains.

Merck explained how he came up with the concept: "When we met with the band they explained that a number of their peers were going the rock & roll route with their music and getting more polished," he said. "With this album they were returning to a rawer and darker sound. I took that to mean instead of doing a bigger and glossier video that we return to the roots of the gritty and lo-fi horror movies that inspired us as kids."

Schieppati explained that they did a two-part video because "a lot of videos nowadays are just bands playing in a forest or a warehouse, so I wanted to do a Rob Zombie-ish horror movie video, basically a mini movie".
