= The Truth (Bleeding Through album) =

Studio album by Bleeding Through
- Released: January 10, 2006
- Recorded: 2005
- Studios: Room of Doom, Irvine, California
- Genres: Metalcore, hardcore punk, death metal
- Length: 42:56
- Labels: Trustkill, Roadrunner
- Producer: Rob Caggiano

Bleeding Through chronology
Wolves Among Sheep (2005)	The Truth (2006)	Declaration (2008)

Singles from The Truth
- 1. "Love in Slow Motion" Released: June 19, 2006; 2. "Kill to Believe" Released: August 1, 2006; 3. "Line in the Sand" Released: April 24, 2007

The Truth is the fourth album by American metalcore band Bleeding Through, released on January 10, 2006. It was produced by Rob Caggiano, former lead guitarist of Anthrax. It was the last album to feature lead guitarist and founding member Scott Danough.

The album produced three singles ("Kill to Believe", "Love in Slow Motion" and "Line in the Sand"), all with accompanying music videos (with "Love in Slow Motion" being a sequel to the "Kill to Believe" video).

== Background ==
In April of 2005, Bleeding Through shared that they had entered Cherokee Studios to begin recording their next album. The band shared that Robb Caggiano would be handling production duties, and that recording would be done at several different studios in Southern California. Vocalist Brandan Schieppati said of the album: "It's going to be a brutal, pissed off record that will be much more blunt and direct in its lyrics, sound, and presentation." Drummer Derek Youngsma said that the band chose Caggiano as the producer due to being impressed by his previous work, and that they felt he could deliver a “big heavy sound.” They also valued his outside perspective, adding he could hear things they might be too close to notice after playing and rewriting songs many times.

The band shared the track listing in October of 2005. In November, three tracks from the album: "For Love and Failing," "Kill to Believe," and "Tragedy of Empty Streets" were made available for streaming via Trustkill's Myspace.

In June of 2006, the band shared that they were recording a music video for the track "Love In Slow Motion," which would serve as a follow-up to the video released to "Kill to Believe." The video was directed by Zach Merck and Kevin Leonard. In February of 2007, the band shared that they were recording a video for the track "Line in the Sand" in Las Angeles, with director Dan Dobi and executive producer Shane Drake. Schieppati shared that the song was about "a relationship I was in with someone who made me feel ugly and empty," and that the video would be stripped-down in comparrison to their last two videos.

The artwork and was done by Asterik Studios.

== Release & Reception ==
Professional ratings
Review scores
Source	Rating
AbsolutePunk	48%
AllMusic	2.5/5 stars
Blabbermouth.net	8/10
Decibel	8/10
PopMatters	6/10
Stylus	B
Punk News	3.5/5 stars

The Truth entered the Billboard charts at number 48 (with 17,500 copies sold in its first week) making it the highest-charting release by the band to date. It has gone on to sell more than 250,000 copies since its release.

Although it received mostly mixed reviews, Billboard magazine called The Truth "one of the four most important hard rock albums of 2006".

As of June of 2006, the album had sold over 75,000 units in the U.S. Blabbermouth.net praised Caggiano’s production, stating “The entire affair feels more focused than This Is Love, This Is Murderous also adding “Don't make the mistake of focusing on image and casting Bleeding Through into the metalcore and eyeliner scrap heap. Doing so might cause you to miss out on a crushingly heavy and eminently memorable album that gets better with repeat listens.” Aubin Paul of punk News wrote “With The Truth, the band has really delivered a near-exceptional metalcore release.”

== The Complete Truth ==
A special edition of the album entitled The Complete Truth was released on July 15, 2008. The band penned a guest blog on the Headbanger's Blog and commented on the release in June of 2008:

"It has been months and we have kept silent. But this latest slap in the face from our supposed record label has pushed us over the edge. We just read on the Internet that Josh Grabelle (Trustkill head honcho) plans to release a 'special edition' of our 2006 album The Truth one month before releasing our new album. Let it be known that Bleeding Through is 100% against this so-called 'special' edition. We did not approve the title, cover artwork (whatever it is), track listing or bonus features for this transparent and obvious cash-grab of a re-release from a record label that despite selling a quarter of a million of our albums worldwide is having problems." Over a year ago we suggested the idea of a re-release of the album to Trustkill – on our terms, of course, with our artistic vision – and he said he'd consider it if we could land a 'big' tour. We confirmed a tour with Marilyn Manson and Slayer, followed by a tour with HIM, and he said 'NO' to us. He thought we should put out a new album instead. Now we have a new album finished that we are very proud of and he wants to squeeze our fans and our band by throwing out an unapproved 'special' edition in a fast and overt attempt to pay some bills."

In August of 2008, Bleeding Through issued an update that Trustkill and the band had made amends:

We felt that you deserved to know what was happening then and similarly, we feel that we owe you an explanation as to what is happening right now. Since the time we posted that blog with MTV2's Headbangers Blog, Trustkill Records delivered the funds necessary to complete the album and to compensate everyone who had loaned us cash. Therefore, since that time, we have moved forward with the label in a spirit of cooperation to ensure that Declaration gets the best release possible to you guys. "That includes a press campaign with interviews all over the place, various promotions, some sale pricing at different retailers, a video for 'Death Anxiety' (which we are scheduled to shoot this month), a licensing deal between Trustkill and Nuclear Blast for the European release of the album, and more. We are very happy to have arrived at this place where the album has a street date and where you can all go out and get it.

== Track listing ==
No.	Title	Length
1.	"For Love and Failing" (featuring Ben Falgoust)	3:33
2.	"The Confession"	2:39
3.	"Love in Slow Motion"	4:35
4.	"The Painkiller"	2:36
5.	"Kill to Believe"	3:57
6.	"Dearly Demented" (featuring Nick 13)	5:22
7.	"Line in the Sand" (featuring Rob Caggiano)	4:09
8.	"She's Gone"	1:31
9.	"Tragedy of Empty Streets"	2:57
10.	"Return to Sender"	4:20
11.	"Hollywood Prison" (featuring Rob Caggiano)	2:52
12.	"The Truth"	4:17
Total length:		42:56

The Complete Truth bonus tracks
No.	Title	Length
13.	"One Last Second"	3:52
14.	"Fall on Proverb" (Unbroken cover)	3:17
15.	"13 Scars"	2:56
16.	"My War" (Black Flag cover)	3:34
17.	"Line in the Sand (Scrap 60 Remix)"	3:35

=== B-sides ===
1. "13 Scars" – 2:54 (only iTunes version of the CD)
2. "One Last Second" – 3:43 (released on Trustkill Takeover, Volume II)

=== "Complete edition" bonus DVD – Live in San Diego ===
1. "For Love and Failing"
2. "Tragedy of Empty Streets"
3. "Love in Slow Motion"
4. "Revenge I Seek"
5. "The Painkiller"
6. "Love Lost in a Hail of Gunfire"
7. "Kill to Believe"

== Personnel ==
Bleeding Through

- Brandan Schieppati – lead vocals
- Scott Danough – guitar
- Brian Leppke – guitar
- Marta Peterson – keyboards
- Ryan Wombacher – bass
- Derek Youngsma – drums

Guest musicians

- Nick 13 (Tiger Army) – vocals on "Dearly Demented"
- Ben Falgoust (Goatwhore, Soilent Green) – vocals on "For Love and Failing"
- Rob Caggiano (Anthrax) – guitars on "Hollywood Prison" and "Line in the Sand"

Production

- Rob Caggiano – guitar, producer, engineer, mixing
- Joe Marchiano – recording, mixing (bonus tracks)
- Thomas Eberger – mastering
- Jeff Gros – photography
- Paul Orofino – MC, mixing
- Eddie Wohl – editing

== Charts ==
Chart (2006)	Peak position
US Billboard 200	48
US Top Independent Albums (Billboard)	1
