= Love in Slow Motion =

Single by Bleeding Through

from the album The Truth
- Released: June 19, 2006
- Recorded: 2005
- Studio: Room of Doom, Irvine, California
- Length: 4:35
- Label: Trustkill; Roadrunner
- Songwriter: Bleeding Through
- Producer: Rob Caggiano

Bleeding Through singles chronology
"Love in Slow Motion" (2006)	"Kill to Believe" (2006)

"Love in Slow Motion" is the first single by American metalcore band, Bleeding Through, from their 2006 album, The Truth.

== Music video ==
The music video shot for the song was directed by Zach Merck and Kevin Leonard and filmed in the California desert. It is the sequel to the band's previous video "Kill to Believe". In a similar way to the first part, "Love in Slow Motion" also shows the band performing while the story evolves. In frontman Brandan Schieppati's words it is "a sort of Texas Chainsaw Massacre meets The Devil's Rejects".

The video takes place in the lair of the backwoods brothers who kidnapped the girlfriend (or bride) of the hero (vocalist Brandan Schieppati) in the first part. The original actress, played by actress Susannah Mills in the prequel video Kill to Believe, is played by a different actress, who wakes from unconsciousness and then tries to escape from the house she was taken to but she doesn't succeed. She is dragged to the brothers' torture chamber where they strap her to a wheelchair. Just as they are to begin the torturing a third man and the psychotic waitress (keyboardist Marta Peterson) with a dog steps in. Moments later a fourth man arrives. After that Schieppati comes in with a baseball bat (probably a continuity mistake as at the end of the first part he was holding a tire jack) to save the girl. They finally escape, they're shown running out of the house together and a few seconds later the waitress (whom Schieppati didn't hurt at all) and another villain step out with a sinister look on their face.

With this video Merck and Leonard was trying to top the first one. "The idea we are going with this one is to make the film Hostel look like a Disney movie," Leonard remarked.
