= Line in the Sand (Bleeding Through song) =

2007 single by Bleeding Through

Single by Bleeding Through

from the album The Truth
- Released: April 24, 2007
- Recorded: 2005
- Studio: Room of Doom, Irvine, California
- Length: 4:09
- Label: Trustkill; Roadrunner
- Songwriter: Bleeding Through
- Producer: Rob Caggiano

Bleeding Through singles chronology
"Kill to Believe" (2006)	"Line in the Sand" (2007)	"Anti-Hero" (2010)

"Line in the Sand" is the third single by Orange County metalcore band Bleeding Through from their 2006 album The Truth. It was released in 2007 through Trustkill Records.

It is the only slow song on the album, described by frontman Brandan Schieppati as "dark, moody and very emotional, it's the ballad on the album".

According to Schieppati, the song is about a relationship he was in with someone who made him feel "ugly and empty".

== Music video ==
Unlike the videos for "Kill to Believe" and "Love in Slow Motion", the music video for "Line in the Sand" is not story-driven, it is simply the band playing the song. It was shot in Los Angeles and directed by Dan Dobi and Shane Drake. "We love the other videos from this album," Schieppati explained. "But we hadn't made a cut-loose-and-destroy performance video in a while, not since 'Love Lost...' from the last album, so we went for it."

The video debuted on Music Choice. It was exclusively broadcast April 16 through April 22.

The music video version of the song has fully re-recorded vocals and the guitar solo also differs from the one heard on the album version. It also features keyboards highly similar to the theme song Lux Aeterna, the theme song from the film Requiem for a Dream, composed by Clint Mansell.

== Track listing ==
Promo single
No.	Title	Length
1.	"Line in the Sand (If I Told You the Truth)"	3:34

Remix single
No.	Title	Length
1.	"Line in the Sand" (Scrap 60 Remix)	3:34
2.	"Line in the Sand" (Music Video with Closed-Captions)	3:35
