= Love Will Kill All =

Love Will Kill All can refer to the following:

- Love Will Kill All (album), an album by American metal band Bleeding Through
- Love Will Kill All, an EP by American metalcore band Calico System
