= Unconsecrated (album) =

Studio album by The Red Shore
- Released: 8 November 2008
- Recorded: Complex Studios
- Genre: Deathcore; technical death metal
- Length: 33:51
- Label: Stomp; Siege of Amida; Rise
- Producer: Roman Koester

The Red Shore chronology
| Salvaging What's Left (2006) | Unconsecrated (2008) | Lost Verses (2009) |

Unconsecrated is the debut studio album by Australian deathcore band The Red Shore, released on 8 November 2008. It was originally set for a 22 September release through Siege of Amida Records, but was delayed. A limited edition was released as a CD/DVD package containing a documentary and live performance.

== Background information ==
In an interview with Australian underground magazine Death Before Dishonour, Jamie Hope revealed that at the time of lead singer Damien Morris' death the band was working on their debut album, as a result the album will feature three tracks with Damien on vocals and the rest with Jamie Hope. He also revealed that the album will feature a slew of guest vocals from Brandan Schieppati of Bleeding Through, Hernan Hermida of All Shall Perish, Karl Schubach of Misery Signals and Dan Weyandt of Zao.

In the same interview, Hope also revealed Damien Morris' concept for the album: "...an epic tale of the forces of heaven and hell battling for the supremacy on the battleground of planet earth".

During I Killed The Prom Queen's 2008 "Say Goodbye" tour, a track titled "The Forefront of Failure" was circulated through promotional CDs distributed by Stomp.

== Track listing ==
| No. | Title | Length |
|---|---|---|
| 1. | "The Garden of Impurity" | 2:32 |
| 2. | "Misery Hymn" | 3:57 |
| 3. | "Deception: Prologue" | 3:04 |
| 4. | "Slain By the Serpent" | 3:08 |
| 5. | "The Architects of Repulsion" | 5:16 |
| 6. | "Your Chariot Awaits" | 3:10 |
| 7. | "Rise and Fall" | 3:21 |
| 8. | "The Forefront of Failure" | 3:54 |
| 9. | "Nephilim" | 1:50 |
| 10. | "Vehemence the Phoenix" | 3:43 |
| Total length: | | 33:51 |

=== Bonus DVD ===
Documentary

1. The Beginning
2. Starting Out
3. Enter Roman
4. Exit Richie – Enter Jake
5. Goodtimes
6. The Crash
7. The Funerals
8. The Aftermath
9. Say Goodbye Tour
10. The Future

Live set

1. "Intro/The Garden of Impurity"
2. "Misery Hymn"
3. "Flesh Couture"
4. "The Valentines Day Massacre"
5. "Deception: Prologue"
6. "Slain by the Serpent"
7. "Thy Devourer"
8. "The Forefront of Failure/Outro"

== Personnel ==
The Red Shore

- Damien Morris – vocals (tracks 1, 5, 8)
- Jamie Hope – vocals (tracks 2, 3, 4, 6, 7, 10)
- Roman Koester – guitar
- Jason Leombruni – guitar
- Jon Green – bass
- Jake Green – drums

Guest Musicians

- Dan Weydant of Zao – vocals (track 5)
- Karl Shubach of Misery Signals – vocals (track 5)
- Hernan Hermida of All Shall Perish – vocals (track 5)
- Brandan Schieppati of Bleeding Through – vocals (track 5)
- Recorded, produced and engineered by Roman Koester at Complex Studios, Melbourne
- Mixed by Zack Ohren at Castle Ultimate Studios, Oakland, California
- Art direction by Invisible Creature

== Charts ==
Chart performance for Unconsecrated
| Chart (2008) | Peak position |
|---|---|
| Australian Albums (ARIA) | 63 |
