= Retrofuture (album) =

Studio album by Tiger Army
- Released: September 13, 2019
- Studio: Kingsize Soundlabs, Los Angeles, California; The Greene Room, Los Angeles, California
- Genre: Psychobilly
- Length: 35:47
- Label: Rise

Tiger Army chronology
| V •••– (2016) | Retrofuture (2019) |

Retrofuture is the sixth studio album by Tiger Army, and the second with producer Ted Hutt, and was released on September 13, 2019. Lead vocalist Nick 13 said the album had a more stripped and guitar-driven production than the band's previous releases. They also say they used vintage equipment in the recording to get a retro 1950s sound. The album features a range of songs in modernized bygone genres, such as classic rock n’ roll, spaghetti-western and doo-wop.

== Track listing ==
Retrofuture track listing
| No. | Title | Length |
|---|---|---|
| 1. | "Tercio de Muerte (Prelude)" | 2:36 |
| 2. | "Beyond the Veil" | 2:38 |
| 3. | "Last Ride" | 3:16 |
| 4. | "Valentina" | 3:25 |
| 5. | "The Past Will Always Be" | 3:28 |
| 6. | "Devil That You Don't Know" | 1:57 |
| 7. | "Death Card" | 2:53 |
| 8. | "Sundown" | 3:01 |
| 9. | "Eyes of the Night" | 1:21 |
| 10. | "Mi Amor la Luna" | 3:31 |
| 11. | "Black Neon" | 3:13 |
| 12. | "Night Flower" | 2:20 |
| 13. | "Shadowlight" | 2:08 |
| Total length: | | 35:47 |

== Personnel ==
- Greg Calbi – mastering
- Keith Cooper – backing vocals
- Djordje Stijepovic – standup bass
- Mike Fasano – drums
- Linas Garsys – artwork
- Ben Grey – backing vocals
- Ted Hutt – acoustic guitar, mixing, producer, shaker, tambourine
- Sergie Loobkoff – artwork
- Ryan Mall – engineer
- Don Nemarnik – technician
- Nick 13 – composer, guitar, vocals
- Skinhead Rob – backing vocals
- Jason Stockwell – technician
- Dave Whiston – guitar technician

== Charts ==
Chart performance of Retrofuture
| Chart (2020) | Peak position |
|---|---|
| US Independent Albums (Billboard) | 9 |
| US Top Album Sales (Billboard) | 29 |
| US Vinyl Albums (Billboard) | 12 |
