= Live in San Diego =

Live in San Diego may refer to:

- Live in San Diego 1974, album by Deep Purple Perks and Tit
- Live in San Diego (film), a concert DVD by the band Switchfoot
- Live in San Diego (Eric Clapton album), live album by Eric Clapton
- Live in San Diego, 2-CD album by Judy Collins
- Live in San Diego (Metallica video album)
- Live in San Diego, a bonus DVD included on the album The Truth (Bleeding Through album)
- Live in San Diego, DVD by Slightly Stoopid
