= Tiger Army III: Ghost Tigers Rise =

Studio album by Tiger Army
- Released: June 29, 2004
- Recorded: Grandmaster Recorders, Los Angeles, California; Sonara Recorders, Los Angeles, California
- Genre: Psychobilly; Alternative rock
- Length: 45:35
- Label: Hellcat Records/Epitaph Records

Tiger Army chronology
Tiger Army II: Power of Moonlite (2001)	Tiger Army III: Ghost Tigers Rise (2004)	Music From Regions Beyond (2007)

Professional ratings
Review scores
Source	Rating
Allmusic	4/5 stars

Tiger Army III: Ghost Tigers Rise is Tiger Army's third full-length album. It was released by Hellcat Records on June 29, 2004. It takes the psychobilly of their first two efforts and layers it with elements of country, blues and punk to create a more mature and emotional sound than previous works. The focus of the lyrics on the album range from topics of ghosts and vampires to life and love. The album was well received and led to their first U.S. headlining tour in spring of 2005.

== Track listing ==
All songs written and composed by Nick 13

No.	Title	Length
1.	"Prelude: Death of a Tiger"	0:53
2.	"Ghost Tigers Rise"	2:09
3.	"Wander Alone"	3:44
4.	"Santa Carla Twilight"	4:44
5.	"Ghostfire"	4:02
6.	"Rose of the Devil's Garden"	3:56
7.	"Atomic"	3:16
8.	"What Happens?"	3:07
9.	"Through the Darkness"	3:05
10.	"The Long Road"	4:31
11.	"Calling"	4:09
12.	"Swift Silent Deadly"	2:46
13.	"Sea of Fire"	5:13
Total length:		45:35

== Personnel ==
Tiger Army

- Nick 13 – Composer
- Geoff Kresge – Mixing, Standup Bass, Vocals
- Fred Hell – Drums

Guests and Other

- Greg Leisz – Pedal Steel
- Andrew Alekel – Engineer, Mixing
- Stevie B – Guitar Technician
- Chad Essig – Assistant Engineer
- Mike Fasano – Drums, Drum Technician
- Gene Grimaldi – Mastering
- Sergie – Graphic Design
