= Nick 13 (album) =

Studio album by Nick 13
- Released: June 7, 2011
- Genre: Americana; alternative country
- Length: 38:15
- Label: Sugar Hill
- Producer: James Intveld; Greg Leisz

Professional ratings
Review scores
Source	Rating
AllMusic	3.5/5 stars

Nick 13 is the debut solo album from Nick 13. He is the founder and frontman for Tiger Army. There are 10 songs total, all in the Americana/Country vein.

The album was released on June 7, 2011 by Sugar Hill Records. It peaked at number 132 on the Billboard 200 and at number 22 on the Billboard Top Country Albums chart.

Nick wrote all of the material for the album, save for "Gambler's Life," which was co-written by Alain Whyte. Musicians on the album include Nick 13, Mitch Marine, Eddie Perez, Joshua Grange and Sara Watkins. The album was recorded in Los Angeles, California and Nashville, Tennessee. It was co-produced by James Intveld and Greg Leisz, who both appear as musicians as well. Jim Scott mixed the album in Los Angeles. Two of the songs on the album are reworked versions of Tiger Army songs: "Cupid's Victim (2011)" and "In the Orchard (2011)."

Nick celebrated the album's release with a performance at Amoeba Music in Hollywood and two sold-out shows at the Troubadour in West Hollywood, California. National touring and festival appearances followed.

There have been two singles released from the album: the video for "All Alone" debuted in 2011 and the one for "Carry My Body Down" followed in 2012. Great American Country's "Out of the Box" and Country Music Television have aired both videos on their programs.

== Track listing ==
All tracks are written by Nick 13 except "Gambler's Life", written by Nick 13 and Alain Whyte.

No.	Title	Length
1.	"Nashville Winter"	3:20
2.	"Carry My Body Down"	3:54
3.	"101"	3:51
4.	"All Alone"	3:27
5.	"Restless Moon"	4:01
6.	"In the Orchard"	3:49
7.	"Someday"	3:56
8.	"Cupid's Victim"	4:10
9.	"Nighttime Sky"	4:32
10.	"Gambler's Life"	3:26

== Chart performance ==
Chart (2011)	Peak position
US Billboard 200	132
US Top Country Albums (Billboard)	22
US Heatseekers Albums (Billboard)	2
US Independent Albums (Billboard)	23
US Top Rock Albums (Billboard)	46
