= Tiger Army II: Power of Moonlite =

Studio album by Tiger Army
- Released: July 24, 2001
- Recorded: January 2001
- Studio: Grandmaster Studios, Hollywood, CA
- Genre: Psychobilly; Horror punk
- Length: 36:17
- Label: Hellcat Records
- Producer: Nick 13

Tiger Army chronology
Tiger Army (1999)	Tiger Army II: Power of Moonlite (2001)	Tiger Army III: Ghost Tigers Rise (2004)

Professional ratings
Review scores
Source	Rating
Allmusic	3/5 stars

Tiger Army II: Power of Moonlite is Tiger Army's second album, released on July 24, 2001. It featured London May on drums, Geoff Kresge on stand up bass and Nick 13 on vocals and guitar. London May left the band before their next album, Tiger Army III: Ghost Tigers Rise (he was replaced with Fred Hell). This album in particular features songs that are laced with rockabilly overtones (such as "Cupid's Victim"), though the band is considered psychobilly.

"Annabel Lee" references the popular poem of the same title by Edgar Allan Poe. Some songs, including "Under Saturn's Shadow" and "Annabel Lee," are backed with vocals by Davey Havok of AFI.

== Track listing ==
All songs written and composed by Nick 13

No.	Title	Length
1.	"Prelude: Call of the Ghost Tigers"	0:50
2.	"Towards Destiny"	2:42
3.	"Incorporeal"	2:40
4.	"Power of Moonlite"	2:58
5.	"When Night Comes Down"	3:18
6.	"Grey Dawn Breaking"	3:10
7.	"Cupid's Victim"	2:30
8.	"Valley of Dreams"	2:48
9.	"Annabel Lee"	3:32
10.	"In the Orchard"	3:51
11.	"Under Saturn's Shadow"	3:04
12.	"F.T.W."	2:14
13.	"Remembered Forever"	2:40
Total length:		36:17

== Personnel ==
Tiger Army

- Nick 13 – guitar, lead vocals, mixing
- Geoff Kresge – double bass, vocals
- London May – drums

Guest musicians

- Lars Frederiksen – additional vocals on "Power of Moonlite" and "Towards Destiny", slide guitar on "Power of Moonlite"
- Matt Freeman – additional vocals on "Power of Moonlite" and "Towards Destiny"
- Davey Havok – additional vocals on "Power of Moonlite", "Annabel Lee", "Grey Dawn Breaking", and "Under Saturn's Shadow"
- Greg Leisz – steel guitar on "In the Orchard"

Other personnel

- Andrew Alekel – audio engineer
- Mike Cornwall – guitar technician
- Andy Ernst – mixing
- Mike Fasano – drum technician
- Gene Grimaldi – mastering
