= V •••– =

Studio album by Tiger Army
- Released: May 20, 2016
- Genre: Alternative rock Psychobilly
- Label: Luna Tone Records/Rise

Tiger Army chronology
Music from Regions Beyond (2007)	V •••– (2016)	Retrofuture (2019)

Professional ratings
Review scores
Source	Rating
New Noise Magazine	4/5 stars
The Young Folks	8/10

V •••– is the fifth studio album from American psychobilly band Tiger Army, released May 20, 2016 on Luna Tone Records/Rise Records. On February 26, 2016, "Prisoner of the Night", the first single from the album, was released on iTunes. Like the first three full-length albums, V •••– contains 13 tracks.

In an interview with the website Noisey, singer and guitarist Nick 13 called the album, "...a pretty significant leap forward for us—it's an evolution in the sound."

== Background ==
In June 2014, Nick 13 announced that writing for a new Tiger Army album was underway via the band's Facebook page. Recording of this album, the band's fifth, was announced to have commenced in March 2015. In October 2015, the band posted the first preview of music from the new album on their Instagram page, a 15-second clip of the song "Prisoner of the Night". On February 26, 2016, "Prisoner of the Night" was released in full on iTunes.

The Morse code for "V" is dot dot dot dash.

== Track listing ==
All tracks composed by Nick 13

No.	Title	Length
1.	"Prelude: Ad Victoriam"	0:48
2.	"Firefall"	2:48
3.	"Prisoner of the Night"	2:56
4.	"I Am the Moth"	2:43
5.	"World Without the Moon"	3:03
6.	"Dark and Lonely Night"	4:10
7.	"Knife's Edge"	2:51
8.	"Devil Lurks on the Road"	3:20
9.	"Happier Times"	4:45
10.	"Candy Ghosts"	2:24
11.	"Train to Eternity"	3:50
12.	"When the Tide Comes In"	3:41
13.	"In the Morning Light"	3:57
Total length:		41:16

== Personnel ==
- Greg Calbi – Mastering
- Casey Curry – Photography
- Keith Douglas – Trumpet
- Mike Fasano – Drum Technician
- Linas Garsys – Artwork
- Ben Grey – Vocals
- Ted Hutt – Claves, Guitar (Acoustic), Mixing, Producer, Shaker, Tambourine
- Greg Kuhn – Keyboards
- Savitri Labensart – Vocals
- Curtis Laur – Guitar Technician
- Greg Leisz – Pedal Steel Guitar
- Sergie Loobkoff – Artwork
- Steve Lu – Clavioline, Farfisa Organ, Hammond B3, Mellotron, Piano, String Arrangements, Strings
- Ryan Mall – Engineer
- Mitch Marine – Drums
- Nick 13 – Composer, Guitar, Marxophone, Vocals
- Jade Puget – Arranger
- Dave Roe – Standup Bass
- Jim Spake – Saxophone

== Charts ==
Chart performance of V•••–
Chart (2016)	Peak position
US Billboard 200	75
