= Music from Regions Beyond =

Studio album by Tiger Army
- Released: June 5, 2007
- Recorded: November 2006 – January 2007
- Genre: Psychobilly, cowpunk, alternative rock
- Length: 36:48
- Label: Hellcat Records
- Producer: Jerry Finn

Tiger Army chronology
Tiger Army III: Ghost Tigers Rise (2004)	Music from Regions Beyond (2007)	V •••– (2016)

Singles from Music from Regions Beyond
- 1. "Forever Fades Away" Released: May 7, 2007; 2. "Pain" Released: February 12, 2008

Professional ratings
Review scores
Source	Rating
Allmusic	3/5 stars
Alternative Press	4/5 stars
This Is Fake DIY	3/5 stars

Music from Regions Beyond is the fourth full-length Tiger Army album, released on June 5, 2007. The album was produced by Jerry Finn. Unlike their previous albums, it does not have a numeral in the title. The album title comes from a line spoken in the Disneyland ride The Haunted Mansion, in the Séance room of the ride. The album reached No. 49 on the Billboard 200.

The song "Afterworld" (featuring Davey Havok of AFI) was uploaded to the band's MySpace profile on February 28, 2007.

The first single, "Forever Fades Away," was released on iTunes on May 7, 2007. "Pain" was released as the second single in February 2008.

The Japanese/Australian releases include a bonus track called "Lovespell," an English language version of "Hechizo de Amor". A remix of "Where the Moss Slowly Grows" by Jade Puget of AFI is available as a bonus track with the purchase of the album on iTunes.

The song "Where the Moss Slowly Grows" is dedicated to a friend of frontman Nick 13's who committed suicide the previous summer.

== Track listing ==
All songs written and composed by Nick 13

1. "Prelude: Signal Return" – 1:06
2. "Hotprowl" – 2:32
3. "Afterworld" – 3:15
4. "Forever Fades Away" – 4:51
5. "Ghosts of Memory" – 3:22
6. "LunaTone" – 3:02
7. "Pain" – 3:37
8. "As the Cold Rain Falls" – 4:08
9. "Hechizo de Amor" – 4:12
10. "Spring Forward" – 3:07
11. "Where the Moss Slowly Grows" – 3:36
12. "Lovespell" (Japan/Australia bonus track) – 4:13
13. "Where the Moss Slowly Grows (Jade Puget remix)" (iTunes bonus track)– 3:15

== Personnel ==
- Nick 13 – vocals, guitar, songwriting
- Jeff Roffredo – double bass, backup vocals
- James Meza – drums
- Greg Leisz – pedal steel guitar on "Where the Moss Slowly Grows"
- Roger Manning – keyboards on "As the Cold Rains Fall"
- Danny McGough – hammond B-3 organ on "Pain" and "Hechizo de Amor"
- Jerry Finn – harmonium on "Hechizo de Amor"
- Davey Havok – additional vocals on "Forever Fades Away", "Afterworld", "Hotprowl" and "Spring Forward"
- Alain Whyte – additional vocals on "Forever Fades Away", "Hotprowl" and "Spring Forward"
- Brandan Schieppati – additional vocals on "Hotprowl"
- Dan Under – additional vocals on "Ghost Of memory" and "Hotprowl"
- Ryan Wombacher, Geoff Kresge, Matt Wedgley and Ryan J. Downey – additional backup vocals on "Prelude: Signal Return" and "Hotprowl"
