= Lost Verses =

Compilation album by The Red Shore
- Released: 9 May 2009
- Recorded: 2009
- Genre: Deathcore; technical death metal
- Length: 32:48
- Label: Stomp Entertainment
- Producer: Roman Koester

The Red Shore chronology
Unconsecrated (2008)	Lost Verses (2009)	The Avarice of Man (2010)

Lost Verses is the first compilation album by Australian deathcore band The Red Shore, released on 9 May 2009. It was released through Australian record label Stomp Entertainment and features re-recorded tracks from the band's past. The album was recorded in between tours in early 2009. Lost Verses was produced, recorded and mixed by the group's guitarist Roman Koester at Complex Studios in Melbourne, Australia. The album debuted and peaked at number 91 on the ARIA Albums Chart.

This would be the last release to feature founding member Jamie Hope.

== Track listing ==
1. "The Valentines Day Massacre" – 3:26
2. "Sink or Swim" – 4:05
3. "Flesh Couture" – 3:00
4. "Knives and Wolves" – 4:09
5. "Pulling Teeth" – 3:24
6. "Effigy of Death" – 3:40
7. "I Only Smile When You're Bleeding" – 2:57
8. "Thy Devourer" – 3:44
9. "What Doesn't Kill You" – 4:23

== Personnel ==
- Jamie Hope – vocals
- Roman Koester – guitar
- Jason Leombrunni – guitar
- Jon Green – bass
- Jake Green – drums

== Charts ==
Chart performance for Lost Verses
Chart (2009)	Peak position
Australian Albums (ARIA)	91
