= Wolves Among Sheep =

Live album / Video album by Bleeding Through
- Released: November 15, 2005
- Length: 5:00:00
- Label: Trustkill

Bleeding Through chronology
This Is Live, This Is Murderous (2004)	Wolves Among Sheep (2005)	The Truth (2006)

Wolves Among Sheep is a music DVD released by Bleeding Through on November 15, 2005, through Trustkill Records.

It features a "career-spanning documentary," interviews with the band members, and footage of performances during the 2005 Strhess tour, in addition to footage from the band's tour in Japan, Australia, and Europe. The band's music videos are also present on the DVD. In October of 2005 a trailer for the DVD was released on the Trustkill website.

The video has a running time of approx. 5 hours (2 hours documentary and 3 hours bonus footage). AFI vocalist Davey Havok makes an appearance on the DVD doing guest vocals for a couple songs. It was rated four stars by Punknews.org.

== Track listing ==
=== Documentary ===
1. "Introduction"
2. "Welcome to The OC, Bitch"
3. "Wolves Among Sheep"
4. "The Path To The Truth"
5. "Exposing The Truth"
6. "The Truth"

=== Bonus material ===
1. "Deleted Scenes"
2. "Live at Soma (July 2005)"
3. "The "Live" Archive"
4. "The "Tour" Archive"
5. ""Love Lost" Music Video"

== Credits ==
- Directed by Ryan Downey
- Edited by David Brundy and Ryan Downey
- Artwork by Rob Dobi
- Photographs by Jeremy Saffer and Greg Straight Edge
