= Tiger Army (album) =

Studio album by Tiger Army
- Released: October 26, 1999
- Recorded: Art of Ears, Hayward, California; Bloodclot Studios and 1014 North Vine Studios, Los Angeles, California in January 1999
- Genres: Psychobilly, punk rock
- Length: 32:38
- Label: Hellcat Records
- Producer: Nick 13

Tiger Army chronology
| Temptation EP (1997) | Tiger Army (1999) | Tiger Army II: Power of Moonlite (2001) |

Professional ratings
Review scores
| Source | Rating |
|---|---|
| Allmusic | 3/5 stars |

Tiger Army is the first full-length release by California psychobilly band Tiger Army, released on October 26, 1999. The band had previously recorded a vinyl EP (the Temptation EP) in 1996, and came to the attention of Tim Armstrong, the owner of Hellcat Records. Armstrong contacted Tiger Army's lead singer, Nick 13, interested in the band recording an album. Although Nick 13 did not initially have a confirmed line-up for the band, the studio line-up consisted of Nick 13, drummer Adam Carson (borrowed from AFI) and bassist Rob Peltier, from The Quakes.

The album cover is based on a poster for the 1932 Frank Buck B-movie Bring 'Em Back Alive.

== Guest appearances ==
- Davey Havok of AFI and Tim Armstrong of Rancid are noted as contributing backing vocals on a number of songs.

== Recording ==
The album was recorded in January 1999 at Art of Ears in California, Bloodclot Studios and 1014 North Vine Studios in Los Angeles. Greg Leisz contributed pedal steel guitar, while Adam Carson of AFI played drums.

== Reception ==
AllMusic reviewer Alex Henderson described Tiger Army as an aggressive punk album with strong rockabilly influences. He noted the album's recurring supernatural themes, particularly on songs such as "Devil Girl", "Trance" and "Werecat". Henderson also highlighted "Outlaw Heart" for incorporating country and western elements through the use of pedal steel guitar.

== Track listing ==
All songs written and composed by Nick 13, except where noted.

1. "Prelude: Nightfall" – 1:52
2. "Nocturnal" – 2:34
3. "Fog Surrounds" – 2:39
4. "True Romance" – 2:18
5. "Devil Girl" – 1:51
6. "Never Die" – 3:00
7. "Moonlite Dreams" – 2:46
8. "Trance" – 2:42
9. "Twenty Flight Rock" – 1:34 (Eddie Cochran Cover)
10. "Werecat" – 2:06
11. "Outlaw Heart" – 3:59
12. "Neobamboom" – 1:55
13. "Last Night" – 3:22
