= Dust to Ashes =

Album by Bleeding Through

Studio album by Bleeding Through
- Released: March 20, 2001
- Recorded: September to October 2000
- Studios: Doubletime Studios, San Diego, California, United States
- Genre: Metalcore
- Length: 40:04
- Label: Prime Directive
- Producer: Jeff Forrest

Bleeding Through chronology
Demo (2000)	Dust to Ashes (2001)	Portrait of the Goddess (2002)

Dust to Ashes is the debut studio album by American metalcore band Bleeding Through. It was released on compact disc by Prime Directive Records on March 20, 2001.

== Release and promotion ==
In December 2000, before Dust to Ashes was released, drummer Born departed in order to focus his energy into his other band Taken. Bleeding Through recruited former Daggers drummer Derek Youngsma. In late February 2001, bass guitarist Kumar hastily quit the band, only to resume his position in time for the album release show a month later.

After releasing the album, the band played two shows with Detroit, Michigan metalcore band Walls of Jericho the following weekend. The first on Saturday, March 24, 2001, at the Veterans' Memorial Hall in Santa Cruz, California; the second, the proper album-release show, on Sunday, March 25, 2001, at the Showcase Theater in Corona, California, supported by Eighteen Visions, Undying and The Kill.

Following months of negotiations, Bleeding Through signed a three-release (two albums and one EP) contract with Huntington Beach, California-based record label Indecision Records in early April 2001. The company's first plan was to co-release the forthcoming 7" vinyl and CD EP with Prime Directive Records in the fall of 2001, followed by the band's sophomore full-length album in early 2002.

In support of Dust to Ashes, Bleeding Through embarked on their first tour; a week's worth of shows with Throwdown on the West Coast. A second tour ensued, which spanned from June 20, 2001, to July 6, 2001, Accompanied by roadie Graham Donath (owner of The Association of Welterweights Records) and Schieppati's other band Eighteen Visions, which was promoting their third full-length album, The Best of Eighteen Visions, released on June 12, 2001, by Trustkill Records. The two bands played through California, Washington, Idaho, Utah, Colorado, Missouri, Nebraska, Montana, Iowa, Kentucky, Illinois and New York, including a performance at Hellfest 2001.

In August 2001, a month after returning from tour, Tafolla left the band. Like the band's former drummer Born, Tafolla left to focus on his other band Taken. Bleeding Through then recruited guitarist Brian Lepke and mostly played local California shows during the rest of the summer and early autumn 2001.

Bleeding Through embarked on a ten-day West Coast tour with From Autumn to Ashes, who were promoting their album Too Bad You're Beautiful released by Ferret Music. Four songs recorded for Dust to Ashes (including one that also appeared on their demo), "Turns Cold to the Touch", "Just Another Pretty Face", "Ill Part Two" and "I Dream of July", were re-recorded for Portrait of the Goddess. The song "Shadow Walker" was later re-recorded for the band's third album, This is Love, This is Murderous.

== Track listing ==
No.	Title	Length
1.	"Turns Cold to the Touch"	5:12
2.	"Hemlock Society"	3:28
3.	"Just Another Pretty Face"	3:01
4.	"Shadow Walker"	2:09
5.	"Ill Part Two"	5:00
6.	"Reflection"	2:49
7.	"I Dream of July"	3:21
8.	"Oedipus Complex"	3:57
9.	"Lay on the Train Tracks"	3:30
10.	"Thrones of Agony"	5:25
11.	"Shadow Walker" (Alternate Version, hidden track after 45-second silence from previous track)	2:12
Total length:		40:04

== Personnel ==
Bleeding Through

- Brandan Schieppati – vocals
- Scott Danough – guitar
- Chad Tafolla – guitar
- Vijay Kumar – bass guitar
- Molly Street – keyboards
- Troy Born – drums, backing vocals (as Tregan Bjorganheigan) on "Shadow Walker (Alternate Version)"

Guest musicians

- Collin O'Brien – backing vocals on "Just Another Pretty Face"
- Steve Helferich – backing vocals on "Oedipus Complex"

Production

- Jeff Forrest – recording and mixing engineer at Doubletime Studios
- Molly Street – photography
- Jason Brown – promotional band photography
- Matt Gigliotti – live band photography
- Marc Jackson – logo design
- Chad Tafolla – layout and design
