= Declaration (Bleeding Through album) =

Studio album by Bleeding Through
- Released: September 30, 2008
- Recorded: April–May 2008
- Studios: Black Cat Studio in Vancouver, British Columbia
- Genres: Metalcore, melodic death metal, symphonic black metal
- Length: 46:10
- Labels: Trustkill; Roadrunner; Nuclear Blast
- Producer: Devin Townsend

Bleeding Through chronology
The Truth (2006)	Declaration (2008)	Bleeding Through (2010)

Declaration is the fifth album by American metalcore band Bleeding Through. It is the band's first album to feature guitarist Jona Weinhofen. The album sold just under 6,000 copies in its first week of release to debut at number 104 on the Billboard 200 chart.

The song's titles are named after different states and cities. Frontman Brandan Schieppati commented, "There are definitely places when we're traveling where every time we go there, we're like, 'Fuck, why do we have to be here?' Like, we'll be in France and all of a sudden we'll feel totally insignificant. You get the feeling that people's eyes are just burning a hole through you."

== Background ==
In March of 2008, the band shared that their upcoming fifth release would be titled Declaration, and that it was scheduled for release in August. The album would be produced by Devin Townsend with recording set to begin in late March, and would be a concept album focused on the struggles of being away from home.

Vocalist Schieppati claimed it will be heavier than the band's 2003 release, This Is Love, This Is Murderous, and would bridge the gap between This Love and The Truth, "The melodies are darker, the riffs are heavier. We just wrote a really aggressive record that encompasses everything we've ever tried to do as a band and then raised the bar a notch or two."

In July of 2008, the band shared that they had signed a deal with Nuclear Blast Records for "Declaration" for all European territories.

In August the band shared that they would be filming a music video for the track "Death Anxiety," directed by Dave Brodsky.

During the Soundwave, the band previewed a new song from the album called "Orange County Blonde and Blue." The song can be watched on YouTube.

On June 6, 2008, Bleeding Through stated in an MTV blog they had finished the record and released details of the album, but that they did not intend to hand the masters over to Trustkill until numerous issues be resolved. This left the supposed August 2008 release date up in the air. Subsequently, they asked to be dropped from Trustkill in the same blog.

Whilst playing at Download Festival in June 2008 Bleeding Through's front man Brandan Schieppati said with regard to the albums "We are having trouble with our record label, so when the new record comes out, steal it, download it illegally, do what you fucking want, as long as you the fans hear it."

In June, one track from the new album named "Orange County Blonde and Blue" was uploaded to the band's official MySpace page. It is unclear how long the track will remain on the page, as the band have stated it is there "for a limited time."

Also it has been made apparent by joining an official fan site called The Dearly Demented, which is supported by the band, a person will receive the song "Germany".

In August of 2008, Bleeding Through issued an update that Trustkill and the band had made amends:

We felt that you deserved to know what was happening then and similarly, we feel that we owe you an explanation as to what is happening right now. Since the time we posted that blog with MTV2's Headbangers Blog, Trustkill Records delivered the funds necessary to complete the album and to compensate everyone who had loaned us cash. Therefore, since that time, we have moved forward with the label in a spirit of cooperation to ensure that Declaration gets the best release possible to you guys. "That includes a press campaign with interviews all over the place, various promotions, some sale pricing at different retailers, a video for 'Death Anxiety' (which we are scheduled to shoot this month), a licensing deal between Trustkill and Nuclear Blast for the European release of the album, and more. We are very happy to have arrived at this place where the album has a street date and where you can all go out and get it.

The album was ultimately released in late September.

== Release & Reception ==
Professional ratings
Review scores
Source	Rating
Alt Press	(#243, p. 154)
Blistering	link
ChartAttack	link
Rock Sound	link
Terrorizer	(Dec 2008)

The album debuted at number 104 on the Billboard 200, selling just under 6,000 copies in its first week. As of May 19, 2010 it had sold 25,000+ copies in the United States.

Critical response was primarily positive. Writing for Blistering.com, Jacob Richardson praised Devin Townsend's production efforts, and noted that the "level of cheesiness" present on The Truth had been turned way down, with the band taking its sound more into the Black Metal realm. CHARTAttack called the release "easily the best [Bleeding Through] have offered in years."

== Track listing ==
1. "Finis Fatalis Spei" – 1:54
2. "Declaration (You Can't Destroy What You Can Not Replace)" (featuring Tim Lambesis of As I Lay Dying) – 3:47
3. "Orange County Blonde and Blue" – 2:40
4. "Germany" – 3:22
5. "There Was a Flood" – 5:48
6. "French Inquisition" – 4:13
7. "Reborn from Isolation" – 4:31
8. "Death Anxiety" – 3:30
9. "The Loving Memory of England" – 1:27
10. "Beneath the Grey" – 3:32
11. "Seller's Market" – 2:38
12. "Sister Charlatan" – 8:47

Bonus tracks

13. "Self Defeating Anthem" – 3:17 (on vinyl edition)

== Personnel ==
Bleeding Through

- Brandan Schieppati – vocals
- Brian Leppke – guitars
- Derek Youngsma – drums
- Ryan Wombacher – bass, vocals
- Marta Peterson – keys
- Jona Weinhofen – guitars

Additional personnel

- Produced, engineered and mixed by Devin Townsend
- Drums edited by Mike Young
- Mastered by Greg Reely
- Art direction, illustrations and design by Angryblue

Guest musicians

- Elyse Jacobson (violin), Josh Belvedere (violin), Eric Edington-Hryb (viola) and Doug Gorkoff (cello) on tracks 1, 2, 3, 5, 6, 8, 12
- Tim Lambesis – guest vocals on track 2
- Dave Nassie – guitar solo on track 10
