= Nine (Bleeding Through album) =

Studio album by Bleeding Through
- Released: February 14, 2025
- Recorded: 2023–2024
- Genre: Metalcore
- Length: 42:13
- Label: SharpTone
- Producers: Bleeding Through, Aaron Chaparian, Tim Lambesis

Bleeding Through chronology
Love Will Kill All (2018)	Nine (2025)

Singles from Nine
- 1. "War Time" Released: April 21, 2023; 2. "Our Brand Is Chaos" Released: May 8, 2024; 3. "Dead but So Alive" Released: September 17, 2024; 4. "Path of Our Disease" Released: November 29, 2024; 5. "I Am Resistance" Released: January 9, 2025

Professional ratings
Review scores
Source	Rating
All About the Rock	9.5/10
Kerrang!	4/5
MetalSucks	3.5/5
Rock Sins	9/10

Nine is the ninth studio album by American metalcore band Bleeding Through. It is their first album in seven years, their longest gap between albums, and it was released by SharpTone Records on February 14, 2025. It is the first album with guitarists John Arnold and Brandon Richter, and their final album with longtime bassist Ryan Wombacher. The songs "War Time", "Our Brand is Chaos", "Dead but So Alive", "Path of Our Disease", and "I Am Resistance" were released in advance as singles.

== Background ==
On April 21, 2023, Bleeding Through released a new song titled "War Time", the band's earliest hint at a new album. In early 2024, the band began to tease new material. By this point, Brandon Richter had become one of two new guitarists for the band, the other being John Arnold who replaced longtime member Brain Leppke in 2022. While working on new material, the band concluded their This is Love, This is Murderous 20th anniversary tour by performing at the United Kingdom's Damnation Festival in February and two shows in the Pacific Northwest in March. On May 8, the band released the second song from their ninth studio album, titled "Our Brand Is Chaos". They appeared at Big Texas Metal Fest in a few weeks later and once again joined Unearth in June for a Boston date celebrating the 20th anniversary of their album The Oncoming Storm.

The band released their album's third single, "Dead But So Alive" on September 17. They returned to the New England Metal and Hardcore Festival a few days later, which were the last shows to feature Wombacher, as he stepped down from performing shows with the band due to back injuries. On November 29, the group announced the upcoming release of the album, titled Nine, with a release date of February 14, 2025, alongside the release of a fourth song, "Path of Our Disease". At that time, the tracklist and cover art were also revealed; the album contains three guest appearances, something the band had not included on an album since Declaration. One of these guests was Andrew Neufeld of Comeback Kid, who was featured on "I Am Resistance", the album's fifth single which was released on January 9, 2025. On February 6, Wombacher announced his permanent departure from the band, citing multiple back injuries which led him to drop from the touring lineup the previous September. He remained on good terms with the rest of the band, and expressed pride in the upcoming album.

== Critical reception ==
Nine received critical acclaim from music critics, with Simon Crampton writing for Rock Sins stating “In many ways Nine is the ultimate Bleeding Through album. This is the sound of a band that is as focused, vicious and hungry as they ever have been. The riffs are sharper than ever, the atmospherics are used perfectly and accentuate and elevate each track they are employed on.”

== Track listing ==
All tracks are written by Bleeding Through.

Nine track listing
No.	Title	Length
1.	"Gallows"	4:39
2.	"Our Brand Is Chaos"	4:35
3.	"Dead but So Alive"	3:25
4.	"Hail Destruction"	4:35
5.	"Lost in Isolation" (featuring Doc Coyle)	4:01
6.	"Last Breath"	1:54
7.	"Path of Our Disease"	3:17
8.	"I Am Resistance" (featuring Andrew Neufeld)	3:35
9.	"Emery"	3:50
10.	"War Time" (featuring Brian Fair)	4:20
11.	"Unholy Armada"	4:02
Total length:		42:13

== Personnel ==
Credits adapted from the album's liner notes.

=== Bleeding Through ===
- Brandan Schieppati – lead vocals
- John Arnold – guitars
- Brandon Richter – guitars
- Ryan Wombacher – bass, backing vocals
- Marta Peterson – keyboards, piano, vocals
- Derek Youngsma – drums, percussion

=== Additional contributors ===
- Aaron Chaparian – production, mixing, mastering
- Tim Lambesis – vocal production
