= The Red Shore =

Australian deathcore band

- Origin: Geelong, Victoria, Australia
- Genres: Deathcore; technical death metal
- Years active: 2004–2011; 2019–present
- Labels: Mediaskare; Listenable; Stomp; Roadrunner; Rise
- Members: Jason Leombruni; Roman Koester; Jake Green; Chase Butler; Tim Anderson
- Past members: Tim Shearman; Jon Green; Damien Morris; Jamie Hope; Richard Johnson
- Website: Facebook.com/theredshore

The Red Shore were an Australian deathcore band from Geelong, Victoria, formed in 2004. They signed to Big Phat Adelaide Records and Modern Music in 2006 and released their first EP, Salvaging What's Left. On March 27, 2006, the band made the news when vocalist Damien Morris and roadie Andy Milner died in a bus crash while on tour.

The surviving members continued with bass player Jamie Hope switching to vocals and signing to Siege of Amida Records. The group released their debut album, Unconsecrated, in 2008. Their final album, The Avarice of Man (2010), was the first released through Roadrunner Australia and featured a straightforward technical death metal sound. It was the group's only release with singer Chase Butler following Hope's departure in 2009.

In 2019, The Red Shore reformed and played one performance, but they have not announced new music.

== History ==
=== Formation and first release (2004–2007) ===
The Red Shore was formed in 2004 by original members Richard Johnson, and Jamie Hope. After a few weeks, they were in need of a guitarist, and Jamie suggested Jason Leombruni. After a brief search for a singer, Damien Morris joined the group. The Red Shore draw their influences from bands such as Hate Eternal, Devourment, Decapitated and Behemoth. With this lineup they released the demo "The Beloved Prosecutors", containing early recordings of the songs, "Effigy of Death", "I Only Smile When You're Bleeding", and "I Threw My Conscious into The Path of Oncoming Traffic". Two of these also made their way onto their debut EP. They signed to Big Phat Adelaide Records and Modern Music in 2006 and released their first EP, Salvaging What's Left. During the recording of the EP producer and engineer Roman Koester began contributing material and eventually joined the band as a second guitarist.

Richard Johnson later left the band saying that he was unable to keep up with their more technical direction. He was soon replaced by Koester's friend, Jake Green, of Melbournes's The Ocularis Infernum.

=== Bus wreck (2007) ===
On 19 December 2007, the band was on the Christmas Carnage tour supporting American band All Shall Perish. At around 7am, The Red Shore's minibus veered off of the Pacific Highway just north of Coffs Harbour. The accident killed singer Damien Morris and driver/merchandiser Andy Milner. In the following days, fans flooded the band's MySpace page with tributes to the two. Morris was 27 at the time of his death. Following the accident, Jamie Hope moved from bass to vocals. It was reportedly Morris' wish that should he not be able to play, or if he left the band, he wanted Hope to be the vocalist because they "had similar voices". The band continued to tour, supporting I Killed the Prom Queen on their 2008 Say Goodbye tour. Jon Green, formerly of Picture the End, filled in on bass for the tour, eventually becoming the band's full-time bass player.

=== Further exposure, Unconsecrated, new vocalist and The Avarice of Man (2008–2010) ===
The Red Shore had planned on releasing their debut album in early 2008, but following the death of Damien Morris, it was delayed. In October 2008, the band embarked on their first overseas tour, alongside UK band Bring Me the Horizon and then headlined the Set It Off Australian tour.

The band released their debut album, Unconsecrated, on 8 November 2008.

The band filmed a music video for the song "Vehemence the Phoenix" and are expected to start recording material for the follow-up to Unconsecrated in June 2009. The music video was released on 10 March.

In early 2009, after signing on for the Australian Summer Slaughter tour, The Red Shore confirmed they would then not be playing alongside Dying Fetus, The Faceless and Necrophagist on the tour. They stated, "Throughout the last few months we felt that certain circumstances pertaining to the tour did not suit the band and this coupled with some ongoing medical problems with some of our members and some financial constraint simply means that opting out of this tour was the best thing for the band at this point in time."

They toured Australia with Bring Me the Horizon and Cancer Bats in May 2009 and released Lost Verses on 9 May. The album compiled old songs, re-recorded in honour of their fallen brothers, and also for the fans that have stood by them. The album debuted and peaked at number 91 on the ARIA Albums Chart.

In August 2009, the band signed a deal with Rise Records, who distributed a special deluxe edition of Unconsecrated across the United States, Canada and Japan. The deluxe edition features nineteen songs and a DVD documentary, along with the debut album, it was released on 27 October 2009. It was also made official on the band's MySpace site that drummer Jake Green had left the band, "due to continuous health constraints". Tim Shearman, formerly of Her Nightmare and Samsara, who filled in on the band's Australia tour with Bring Me The Horizon, will be his permanent replacement. Tim embarked on his first tour with the band in September for the Lost Versus tour. The band has recently mentioned the possibility of going overseas to record the next album.

The band also toured Australia as the main support for America's The Acacia Strain throughout November 2009. During this tour, Before The Throne vocalist Chase Butler filled in for vocalist Jamie Hope. After the completion of the tour it was announced that Jamie Hope would be leaving the band and Chase Butler would be taking over the position of front man full-time. Jamie Hope would later on join I Killed the Prom Queen. On top of that the band also announced that they had signed a deal with Roadrunner Records Australia, and that a new full-length album would be released in 2010. On 26 July, Triple J premiered the new single, entitled "The Seed of Annihilation", the first song to feature Chase Butler on vocals. It is now currently streaming on their MySpace page. The Avarice of Man was released on 3 September 2010. It has been considered a more technical death metal style. The Red Shore then went on tour in the United States with the No Mercy Tour along with Suffokate, And Hell Followed With, Murder Death Kill and King Conquer. They were set to support Despised Icon on the Australian leg of their final tour in November. In an interview released November 2010, guitarist Roman Koester stated that whilst touring in the US the band filmed a video clip for the song "The Seed of Annihilation". The music video debuted June 2011.

=== Break-up (2011) ===
On 5 October 2011, the band stated on their Facebook that they had broken up as members have moved onto other projects and different stages of life. "It is with much love, respect & regret that we have to announce the end of The Red Shore. The members have moved onto other projects and different stages of life, which meant that the band could not continue. The Red Shore has been such a large part of our lives and we the members past and present would like to take this opportunity to thank everyone for all of their love and support over the years, through the good times and the bad, ups and downs. You gave us the strength to carry on and for this we are eternally grateful. We would like to also thank all the bands who helped out and our labels who helped push us. B.P.A records, Stomp, S.O.A.R, Rise, Mediaskare, Roadrunner Australia, Listenable. Not to mention all the endorsements, Pearl, Sabian, Pro-Mark, Schecter, Ampeg, Godlyke, Framus, Peavey, Drop Dead, To Die For, Macbeth. We are very proud of our achievements and have many great memories, so once again thanks for making our dreams come true & stay tuned for TRS members new projects! Thank you". Guitarist Roman Koester would go on and join Boris the Blade.

=== Reformation (2019) ===
In October 2019, it was announced that the band would be performing at Invasion Fest 2020 in Sydney. Following the festival, they announced they would be playing another show in Melbourne.

== Band members ==
Current line-up

- Jason Leombruni – guitars (2004–2011, 2019–2020)
- Roman Koester – guitars (2005–2011, 2019–2020)
- Jake Green – drums (2007–2009, 2019–2020)
- Chase Butler – vocals (2009–2011, 2019–2020)
- Tim Anderson – bass (2010–2011, 2019–2020)

Former members

- Jamie Hope – bass (2004–2007); vocals (2008–2009)
- Damien "Damo" Morris – vocals (2004–2007; died 2007)
- Richard Johnson – drums (2004–2007)
- Jon Green – bass (2008–2010)
- Tim Shearman – drums (2009–2011)

Timeline

== Discography ==
=== Albums ===
List of albums, with selected details and chart positions
| Title | Details | Peak chart positions |
| Title | Details | AUS |
|---|---|---|
| Unconsecrated | Released: 10 November 2008; Label: Siege of Amida, Stomp Entertainment, Rise | 63 |
| Lost Verses | Released: 9 May 2009; Label: Stomp Entertainment | 91 |
| The Avarice of Man | Released: 3 September 2010; Label: Mediaskare, Roadrunner, Stomp Entertainment | 54 |

=== Extended plays ===
List of extended plays, with selected details
| Title | Details |
|---|---|
| Salvaging What's Left | Released: 27 March 2006; Label: Big Phat Adelaide/Modern Music |

=== Demos ===
- The Beloved Prosecutors (2005)
