= Brandan Schieppati =

American metalcore singer (born 1980)

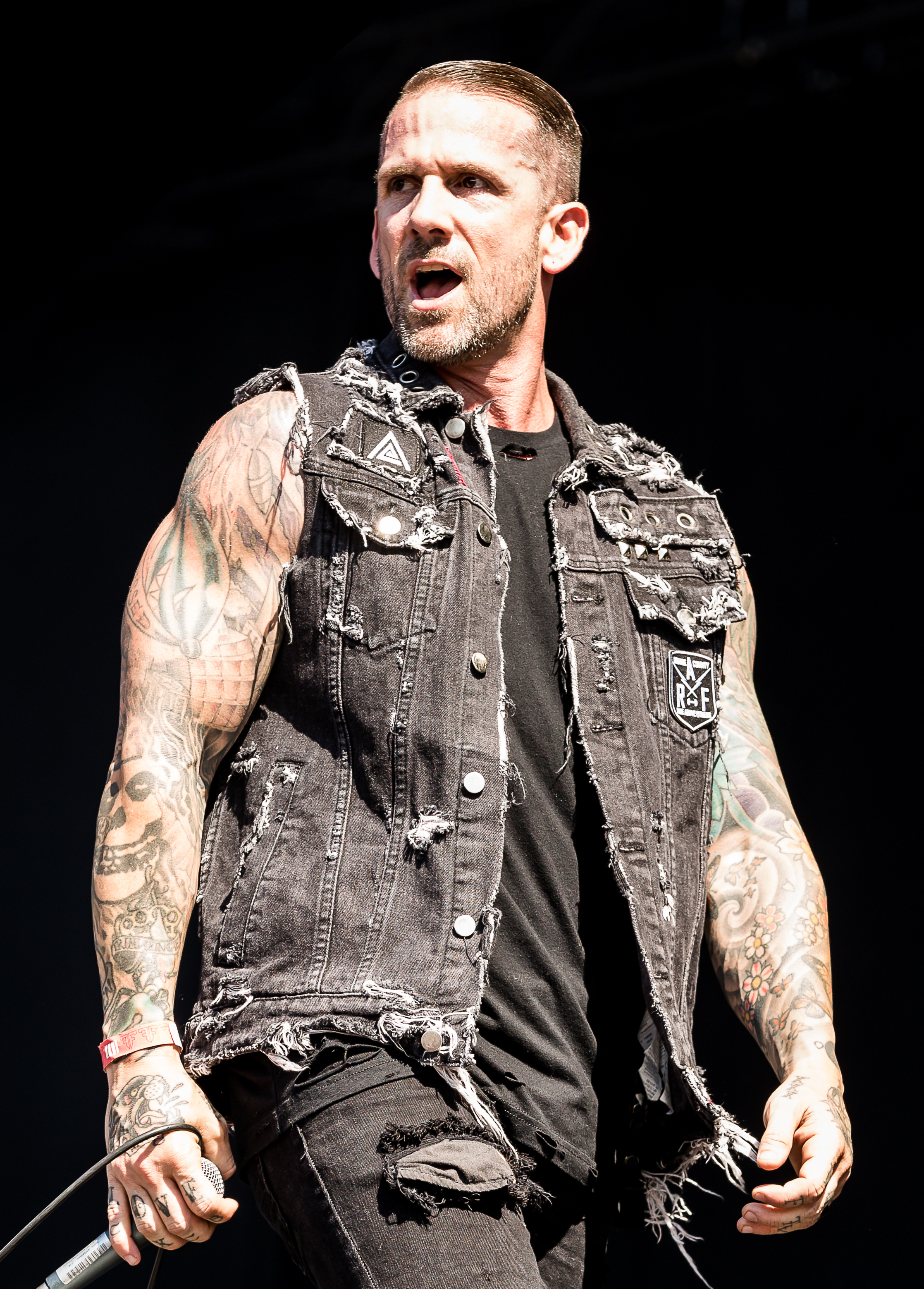
- Schieppati with Bleeding Through in 2019

Background information
- Also known as: Sheep
- Born: August 3, 1980 (age 46); Newport Beach, California, U.S.
- Genres: Metalcore; extreme metal; hardcore punk
- Occupations: Singer; musician; songwriter
- Instruments: Vocals; guitar
- Years active: 1994–present
- Member of: Bleeding Through
- Formerly of: Throwdown; Eighteen Visions
- Website: riseabovefitnessoc.com

Brandan Schieppati (born August 3, 1980) is an American musician. He is the singer of metalcore band Bleeding Through and a former guitarist/songwriter of the fellow Orange County metalcore band Eighteen Visions, for which he played from 1997 to 2002. He is also a bodybuilder, personal trainer and "Rise Above Fitness" gym owner. He was strictly straight edge from an early age until his late twenties.

== Career ==
Schieppati has been in Eighteen Visions, Throwdown, Bleeding Through, The Mistake and Die Die My Darling, a Misfits cover band from which nothing has been released. He formed a band—the Innocent—along with Brooks Wackerman, Ryan Sinn and Dave Nassie. Schieppati is also the vocalist for a side project, Suffer Well, with Mick Kenney and Trevor Friedrich on drums.

In June 2002, Schieppati's jaw was broken in a fight after a show. He went through surgery the next day. Though this resulted in Bleeding Through canceling their tour in support of Portrait of the Goddess, he recovered quickly enough to play at Hellfest 2002.

He contributed guest vocals on the track "The Architects of Repulsion" on Australian deathcore band The Red Shore's debut album Unconsecrated. Also on AFI's Decemberunderground (2006) and Tiger Army's Music from Regions Beyond as backing vocals. Also performing guest vocals on the track "Widowmaker" on Psyclon Nine's album We the Fallen. He also has featured in Miss May I's Monument, on an iTunes pre-order bonus track. He was also featured in the song "If It's Dead, We'll Kill It" by metal band Motionless in White.

He was also managing a few bands including Letlive, Stray from the Path, For the Fallen Dreams, the Tony Danza Tapdance Extravaganza, Lionheart, All Shall Perish, and the Ghost Inside.

He started a side project—I Am War—with Alex Varkatzas. Varkatzas described the music as "brutal heavy short fast blasts of metallic hardcore punk". They released one album: Outlive You All. In 2015, he created a one-man band: The Iron Son. The solo project released one studio album on December 1: Enemy. Schieppati has played intermittent shows with the Iron Son with fill-ins for live performances, and usually includes Manny Contreras of Impending Doom, Derek Youngsma of Bleeding Through, Justin Bock of Winds of Plague, Robert Bloomfield of MyChildren MyBride and Brandon Richter formerly of A Skylit Drive and Falling in Reverse.

Bleeding Through played their final show on August 3, 2014, at Chain Reaction in Anaheim, California, and the band ended after a 15-year career. He said they were proud of everything they have accomplished. However in 2018, the band re-formed releasing Love Will Kill All on May 25 through SharpTone Records.

Schieppati is the owner of Rise Above Fitness, a gym located in Huntington Beach. He has also developed an apparel line for RAF and sells shirts, tank tops, hats, sweatshirts, and women's leggings.

== Discography ==
Eighteen Visions

- Lifeless (Life Sentence, 1997)
- Yesterday Is Time Killed (Cedargate, 1999)
- No Time for Love (Trustkill, 1999)
- Until the Ink Runs Out (Trustkill, 2000)
- The Best of Eighteen Visions (Trustkill, 2001)
- Vanity (Trustkill, 2002)

Throwdown

- Beyond Repair (Indecision, 1999)

Bleeding Through

- Demo (self-released, 2000)
- Dust to Ashes (Prime Directive, 2001)
- Portrait of the Goddess (Indecision, 2002)
- This Is Love, This Is Murderous (Roadrunner/Trustkill, 2003)
- The Truth (Roadrunner/Trustkill, 2006)
- Declaration (Roadrunner/Trustkill, 2008)
- Bleeding Through (Rise, 2010)
- The Great Fire (Rise, 2012)
- Love Will Kill All (Sharptone, 2018)
- Nine (Sharptone, 2025)

Suffer Well

- Sorrows (Century Media, 2011)

I Am War

- Outlive You All (Razor & Tie, 2012)

The Iron Son

- Enemy (Pvre Evil Records, 2015)

=== Guest appearances ===
- 2007 – "Hotprowl" Tiger Army on "Music from Regions Beyond"
- 2008 – "The Architects of Repulsion" (The Red Shore on Unconsecrated)
- 2009 – "Widowmaker" (Psyclon Nine on We the Fallen)
- 2010 – "Rust" (Miss May I on Monument)
- 2010 – "Follow the Trail of Blood" (Combichrist on Making Monsters)
- 2011 – "Pure Anger" (Lionheart on Built on Struggle)
- 2012 – "If It's Dead, We'll Kill It" (Motionless in White on Infamous)
- 2015 – "Death Rate" (Crucible) single
