= Bleeding Through (album) =

Studio album by Bleeding Through
- Released: April 13, 2010
- Recorded: December 2009 – January 2010
- Studio: Planet Z Studios in Hadley, Massachusetts
- Genre: Metalcore, melodic death metal, symphonic black metal
- Length: 45:34
- Label: Rise (US), Distort (Canada), Roadrunner (UK)
- Producer: Zeuss

Bleeding Through chronology
Declaration (2008)	Bleeding Through (2010)	The Great Fire (2012)

Bleeding Through is the sixth studio album by American metalcore band Bleeding Through. The album was released through Rise Records on April 13, 2010.

== Background ==
The eponymous album is the band's first release through Rise Records after a very open and public fallout with their previous label, Trustkill Records, in 2008. Bleeding Through announced the split with Trustkill shortly after releasing their previous album, Declaration. In late 2009, the band announced their signing to Rise Records. Craig Ericson, President of Rise expressed his excitement to work with Bleeding Through stating, "We've been huge fans ever since they released an album on Indecision Records. Having Bleeding Through in the family is a dream come true. We both share extreme passion for music and can't wait to show the world what we can achieve together as a team." The band was mutually excited to work with Rise, due to the label's enthusiasm to help the band grow and reach their potential. Vocalist Brandan Schieppati stated, "After 10 years, we have been content with the fan base, the familiarity of touring and the comfort of knowing what to expect at every show. Rise wants to build on that."

Bleeding Through is also the first studio album to feature Dave Nassie, who has previously played in punk rock groups No Use for a Name, 22 Jacks, Suicidal Tendencies and the funk metal band Infectious Grooves. Nassie replaced former guitarist Jona Weinhofen, who left Bleeding Through after two years due to Trustkill not paying royalties and returned home to Australia.

== Reception ==
Professional ratings
Review scores
Source	Rating
Allmusic	3.5/5 stars
Alternative Press	4/5 stars
BBC	(fairly positive)
Kerrang!	4/5 stars
PopMatters	(6/10)
Rock Sound	(8/10)
Sputnikmusic	(2/5)

Bleeding Through debuted at number 143 on the US Billboard 200 with 3,700 copies sold in the first week. This is significantly lower than the band's previous album, 2008's Declaration, which peaked at number 101 and sold 6,000 copies in the first week.

Overall the album received positive reviews, with Rock Sound writing “their self-titled sixth installment offers a version more complete than any of the band’s previous efforts and a more genuine blend of the two genres than recent trend attempts.” AllMusic wrote that the album “strikes the perfect balance between punk, grindcore, and symphonic metal.”

== Track listing ==
1. "A Resurrection" – 1:54
2. "Anti-Hero" – 3:09
3. "Your Abandonment" – 3:30
4. "Fifteen Minutes" – 3:48
5. "Salvation Never Found" – 4:49
6. "Breathing in the Wrath" – 4:29
7. "This Time Nothing Is Sacred" – 3:16
8. "Divide the Armies" – 4:50
9. "Drag Me to the Ocean" – 3:51
10. "Light My Eyes" – 2:42
11. "Slow Your Roll" – 3:22
12. "Distortion, Devotion" – 5:54
13. "Revolving Hype Machines" – 1:15 (bonus track)

== Personnel ==
Bleeding Through

- Brandan Schieppati – lead vocals
- Brian Leppke – guitars
- Dave Nassie – guitars
- Ryan Wombacher – bass, backing vocals
- Marta Peterson – keyboards, piano
- Derek Youngsma – drums, percussion

Production

- Chris "Zeuss" Harris – producer
