= Portrait of the Goddess =

Studio album by Bleeding Through
- Released: April 30, 2002
- Recorded: November 2001 – February 2002
- Studios: F-1 Studios, Brea, CA
- Genres: Metalcore, melodic death metal
- Length: 39:38
- Label: Indecision
- Producer: Greg Koller

Bleeding Through chronology
Dust to Ashes (2001)	Portrait of the Goddess (2002)	This Is Love, This Is Murderous (2003)

Professional ratings
Review scores
Source	Rating
Lambgoat	7/10

Portrait of the Goddess is the second studio album by American metalcore band Bleeding Through. The album was released on April 30, 2002 through Indecision Records.

Tracks "Just Another Pretty Face", "Turns Cold to the Touch", "III Part 2" and "I Dream of July" first appeared on their debut album Dust to Ashes and the band decided to re-record the tracks for this album.

== Track listing ==
No.	Title	Length
1.	"Rise" (featuring John Pettibone)	2:06
2.	"Our Enemies"	3:23
3.	"Wake of Orion"	5:25
4.	"Just Another Pretty Face"	3:04
5.	"Savior, Saint, Salvation" (featuring M. Shadows and Synyster Gates)	6:33
6.	"Turns Cold to the Touch"	4:16
7.	"Portrait of the Goddess"	3:08
8.	"Ill Part 2"	4:41
9.	"I Dream of July"	3:34
10.	"Insomniac"	3:28

== Personnel ==
- Scott Danough – guitar
- Brian Leppke – guitar
- Brandan Schieppati – vocals
- Vijay Kumar – bass
- Molly Street – keyboard
- Derek Youngsma – drums
- Greg Koller – producer, engineer, mastering
- Dave Mandel – layout design
- Mike Milford – layout design
