= The Great Fire (album) =

Studio album by Bleeding Through
- Released: January 31, 2012
- Recorded: June 27, 2011 – November 30, 2011
- Genre: Metalcore, hardcore punk, extreme metal
- Length: 39:07
- Label: Rise
- Producer: Mick Kenney, Brandan Schieppati

Bleeding Through chronology
Bleeding Through (2010)	The Great Fire (2012)	Love Will Kill All (2018)

Professional ratings
Review scores
Source	Rating
About.com	4/5 stars
AllMusic	3.5/5 stars
Alternative Press	4/5 stars
Rock Sound	7/10

The Great Fire is the seventh studio album by American metalcore band Bleeding Through. The album was released by Rise Records on January 31, 2012. It was the band's last album before their split in 2014 and their reunion in 2018.

== Background ==
The band planned to write and record their seventh studio album once they come back from touring. They planned to release the yet to be titled album anywhere from mid to late 2011, which bassist Ryan Wombacher explained in a November 2010 interview:

"Maybe mid-year; safe to say towards the end but not at the end, maybe like eight months or something like that. Best thing about it is we're going to do it whenever we want to do it. There is no deadline right now, we don't have any dates set, we don't have the studio, we're going to do the record ourselves. So we will literally go in and record it and it will be probably be done before we sign a contract."

On November 14, 2011, the band announced that the name of their new record would be called "The Great Fire". On November 30, 2011, they announced that the album was complete, although no release date has been stated. On December 14, 2011, the release date was revealed to be January 31, 2012.

== Track listing ==
No.	Title	Length
1.	"The March"	1:44
2.	"Faith in Fire"	1:57
3.	"Goodbye to Death"	2:33
4.	"Final Hours"	3:56
5.	"Starving Vultures"	2:44
6.	"Everything You Love Is Gone"	1:49
7.	"Walking Dead"	4:05
8.	"The Devil and Self Doubt"	3:02
9.	"Step Back in Line"	2:47
10.	"Trail of Seclusion"	3:41
11.	"Deaf Ears"	2:54
12.	"One by One"	1:38
13.	"Entrenched"	3:42
14.	"Back to Life"	2:38

DVD

1. Live show from Chain Reaction, California

== Personnel ==
Bleeding Through

- Brandan Schieppati – lead vocals
- Brian Leppke – guitars
- Dave Nassie – guitars
- Ryan Wombacher – bass, backing vocals
- Marta Peterson – keyboards, piano
- Derek Youngsma – drums, percussion

Production

- Cameron Miller – backing vocals
- Mick Kenney – producer, engineering, mixing, mastering
- Brandan Schieppati – producer
- Erol Ulug – engineering (drums)
- Ola Englund – engineering (guitars)
- Dan Mumford – artwork, design
