= This Is Live, This Is Murderous =

Live album / Video album by Bleeding Through
- Released: June 15, 2004
- Recorded: January 2004; The Glasshouse; Pomona, California
- Length: 50:00
- Label: Kung Fu

Bleeding Through chronology
This Is Love, This Is Murderous (2003)	This Is Live, This Is Murderous (2004)	Wolves Among Sheep (2005)

This Is Live, This Is Murderous is a music DVD released by Bleeding Through on June 15, 2004, through Kung Fu Records. The concert footage was recorded in January 2004 at the Glasshouse in Pomona, California. The video has a running time of 50 minutes. It was rated 3.5 stars by Punknews.org.

== Track listing ==
1. "Intro"
2. "Love Lost in a Hail of Gunfire"
3. "Revenge I Seek"
4. "Rise"
5. "Our Enemies"
6. "Sweet Vampirous"
7. "Number Seven With A Bullet"
8. "Turns Cold To The Touch"
9. "Murder By Numbers"
10. "Wake of Orion"
11. "Savior, Saint, Salvation"
12. "Insomniac"
13. "Outro"

For the first minute of the first song being played is studio audio but then becomes live audio from the actual show.

== DVD features ==
- Region 0
- Keep Case
- Full Frame
- 1.33
- Additional Release Material
- Audio Commentary
- Interactive Features:
- Multiple Angles
