= Kevin Leonard =

British journalist

Kevin Leonard is a journalist and reporter for BBC news online and the BBC Wales Today news programme.
