= Nick 13 =

American singer-songwriter

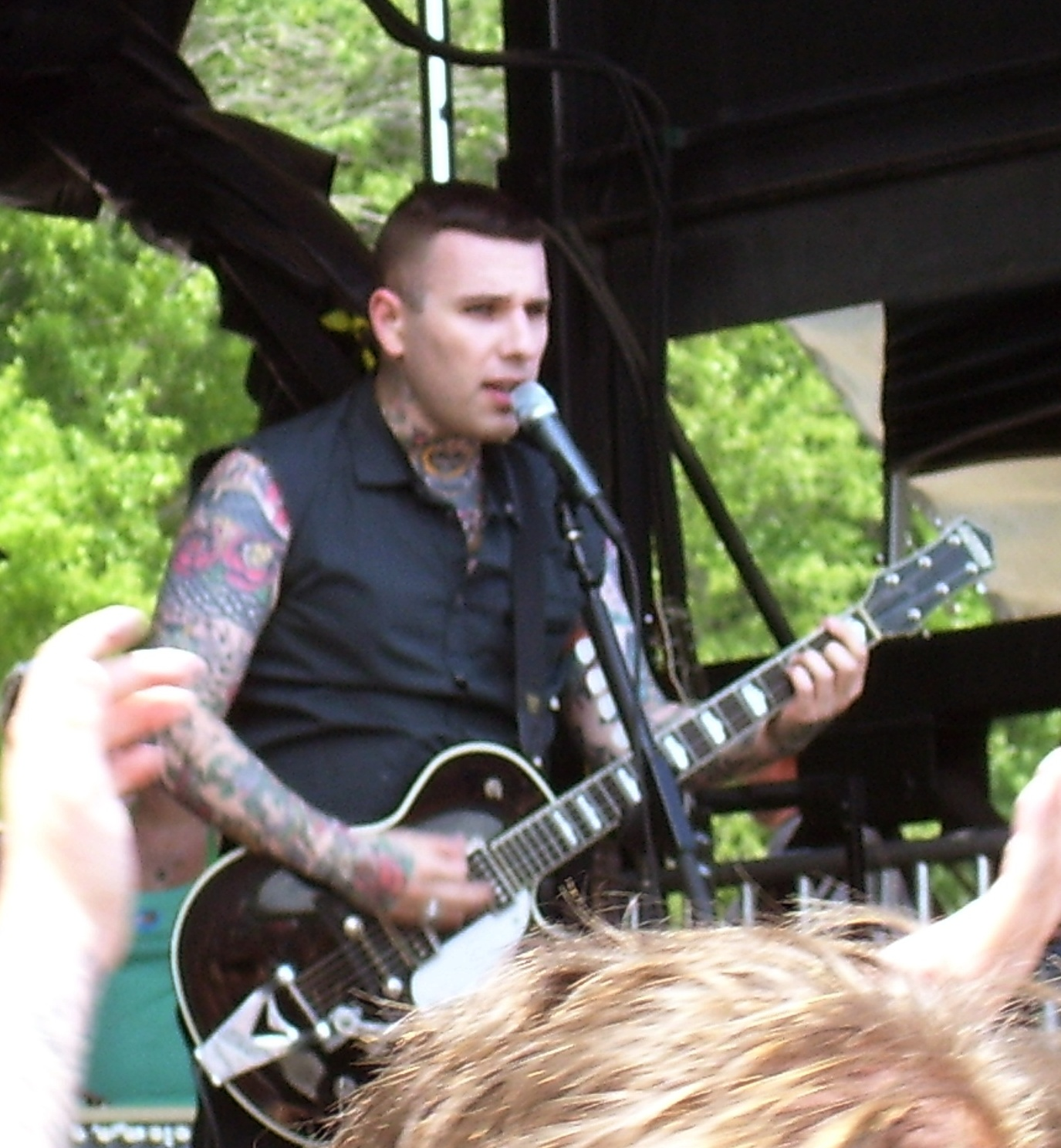
- Nick 13 playing at Warped Tour in 2007.

Background information
- Origin: Ukiah, California, U.S.
- Genres: Alternative country; psychobilly
- Occupations: Musician, singer-songwriter, lyricist, vocalist, guitarist
- Instruments: Vocals, guitar, piano
- Member of: Tiger Army

Kearney Nick Jones, better known by his stage name Nick 13, is the lead vocalist, guitarist and main songwriter of psychobilly band Tiger Army, as well as a solo artist in the alternative country genre.

== Career ==
=== Tiger Army ===
Tiger Army was signed to Hellcat Records in 1996 shortly after forming and released their self-titled full-length debut album in October 1999. That album was followed by 2001's Tiger Army II: Power of Moonlite, 2004's Tiger Army III: Ghost Tigers Rise and 2007's Music from Regions Beyond before leaving the label. Their latest album, V •••–, was released in 2016 on Luna Tone Records/Rise Records.

=== Solo career ===
In an interview, Nick 13 was asked why the sole songwriter for a band would launch a solo career. "The first person to give me the idea of a primary songwriter making a solo record was Paul Fenech of The Meteors," he said. "I always thought there was something cool about that: You write all the songs for the band, and there's a certain sound people expect. But while Tiger Army has always tested those kinds of boundaries, there are certain things that relate to heaviness and aggression that aren't part of my solo project, at all." When asked about the status of Tiger Army, he said, "Tiger Army aren't going anywhere—we will be back."

His first full performance as a solo artist was at the Stagecoach Festival in Indio, California, in spring, 2010, where he opened for Merle Haggard and Ray Price. A handful of small club dates in California followed, leading up to an appearance at the Hootenanny Festival in Orange County just before Chuck Berry. Press reviews for both festival events were favorable.

Nick revealed in an interview with No Depression that he had recorded with a wide-ranging group of notable musicians including Greg Leisz, Eddie Perez, Lloyd Green, Joshua Grange, and Mitch Marine. According to Nick's official Twitter page updates, album work continued as of December 2010. The album was co-produced by Greg Leisz and James Intveld.

Following Nick's performance at South By Southwest, Sugar Hill Records announced that they would be releasing Nick's debut solo album on June 7, 2011. He kicked off touring in support of the album with two nights at The Troubadour in West Hollywood, followed by national touring through October 2011.

The album has been very well received by the Americana press. Nick's road support of the album included an appearance at Austin City Limits Music Festival. Nick made several appearance's on Nashville's WSM Radio in November 2011, including a performance at Americana Carnival. Great American Country added the video for "All Alone" to their "Out of the Box" program in December 2011 and has continued to air it throughout 2012. In January 2012, Nick appeared at the NAMM Show where he performed and met with fans at the booth operated by Gretsch, his guitar endorser. In the summer of 2012, Nick headlined two nights at the El Rey Theatre in Hollywood and released a music video for "Carry My Body Down."

The video for "Carry My Body Down" began airing on Great American Country's "Out of the Box" program and on Country Music Television in late summer, 2012. The video reached No. 1 on CMT Pure's "12-Pack Countdown" in November 2012. Nick appeared at the 2013 Stagecoach Festival with Dwight Yoakam, Marty Stuart and more, broadcast on AXS TV. The video for "Nighttime Sky" arrived around the same time, eventually debuting at No. 1 on CMT Pure's "12-Pack Countdown" and staying there for 6 consecutive weeks. Nick tweeted plans to shoot and direct a fourth video himself, for the track "In the Orchard." This video was released in July 2014.

According to his official Twitter account, Nick intends to write and record a second solo album before creating a new Tiger Army album. Nick 13 is a practitioner of Transcendental Meditation.

Nick has stated that he does not mix politics with music, but has criticized George W. Bush and the religious right.

== Discography ==
=== Studio albums ===
Title	Details	Peak chart positions				
Title	Details	US Country	US	US Heat	US Indie	US Rock
Nick 13	Release date: June 7, 2011; Label: Sugar Hill Records; Formats: CD, LP, music download	22	132	2	23	46

=== Music videos ===
Year	Video	Director
2011	"All Alone"	
2012	"Carry My Body Down"	Aron Paul Orton
2013	"Nighttime Sky"	Aron Paul Orton
2014	"In the Orchard"	Nick 13
