= Love Will Kill All (album) =

Studio album by Bleeding Through
- Released: May 25, 2018
- Recorded: 2018
- Genre: Metalcore; extreme metal
- Length: 37:00
- Label: SharpTone
- Producer: Brandan Schieppati

Bleeding Through chronology
The Great Fire (2012)	Love Will Kill All (2018)	Nine (2025)

Professional ratings
Review scores
Source	Rating
Metal Injection	8/10

Love Will Kill All is the eighth studio album by American metalcore band Bleeding Through. It is their first album since they reformed in 2018 after their four-year split, and it was released by SharpTone Records on May 25, 2018. A music video was released for the song "Set Me Free" on April 6, 2018.

== Track listing ==
No.	Title	Length
1.	"Darkness, a Feeling I Know"	1:21
2.	"Fade into the Ash"	3:25
3.	"End Us"	3:25
4.	"Cold World"	3:03
5.	"Dead Eyes"	3:13
6.	"Buried"	2:54
7.	"No Friends"	3:17
8.	"Set Me Free"	3:35
9.	"No One from Nowhere"	2:35
10.	"Remains"	3:50
11.	"Slave"	2:20
12.	"Life"	4:02
Total length:		37:00

== Personnel ==
- Brandan Schieppati – lead vocals
- Brian Leppke – guitars
- Ryan Wombacher – bass guitar, backing vocals
- Marta Peterson – keyboards, piano, backing vocals
- Derek Youngsma – drums, percussion

== Charts ==
Chart performance of Love Will Kill All
Chart (2018)	Peak position
US Independent Albums (Billboard)	10
US Top Album Sales (Billboard)	46
US Top Hard Rock Albums (Billboard)	22
