= Tiger Army =

American psychobilly band

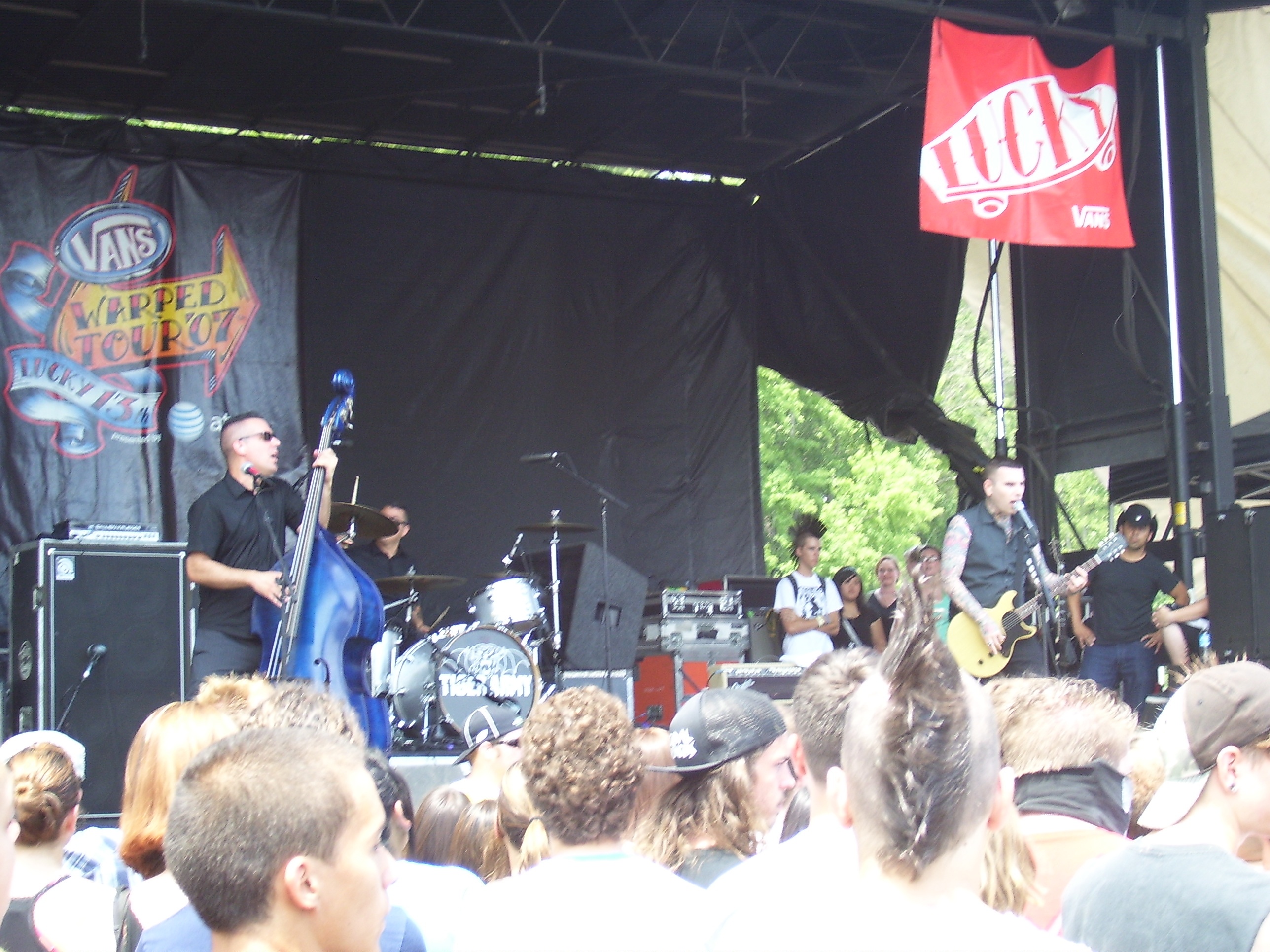
- Tiger Army performing at Warped Tour 2007

Background information
- Origin: Berkeley, California, U.S.
- Genres: Psychobilly; horror punk; alternative rock
- Years active: 1996–present
- Labels: Luna Tone, Rise, Chapter Eleven, Hellcat
- Members: Nick 13; Djordje Stijepovic; Mike Fasano
- Past members: Geoff Kresge; Joel Day; Adam Carson; London May; Fred Hell; Jeff Roffredo; Jeff "Dirty Bird" Lehmann; James Meza
- Website: tigerarmy.com

Tiger Army is an American psychobilly band based in Los Angeles, California. The group was formed in 1996 in Berkeley, California, and its only constant member is singer, guitarist, and lead songwriter Nick 13. The band has released six studio albums and four EPs.

== History ==
Nick 13 formed Tiger Army in early 1996 amid California's East Bay skateboarding scene. The band played its first show at the famous 924 Gilman Street venue in Berkeley, California. Its punk sound drew from rock n' roll and rockabilly. Their first official release, produced by Chapter 11 Records, was a self-titled vinyl record EP (sometimes referenced by the first track, "Temptation") featuring AFI's drummer Adam Carson and Joel Day on stand-up bass.

Hellcat Records, co-owned by Rancid's Tim Armstrong, soon signed the band. Joel Day departed and the Quakes stand-up bassist Rob Peltier was hired to play on the debut album. Adam Carson also played on the record. The band then embarked on a California mini-tour promoting the self-titled album, which was released in October 1999. In 2000, former AFI bassist Geoff Kresge, one of Nick 13's bandmates from Influence 13, joined Tiger Army, in addition to ex-Samhain drummer London May.

The band's second album, Tiger Army II: Power of Moonlite, followed in 2001. Fred Hell replaced May shortly after the recording. The band toured with TSOL, The Damned, Dropkick Murphys and others in support of the record, going to Europe and Japan for the first time. The band's friend and drum tech, Mike Fasano, played on the next album, Tiger Army III: Ghost Tigers Rise, when Hell was shot four times in a home-invasion robbery. Nick 13 announced a new band lineup, featuring drummer James Meza and stand-up bassist, Jeff Roffredo (formerly of Los Angeles psychobilly bands Cosmic Voodoo, Calavera, and The Rezurex) in 2004. This lineup supported Social Distortion on an extensive US tour.

In early 2005, the band headlined a string of five sold-out shows at the Hollywood House of Blues. The following year, the band sold out four nights at the Anaheim House of Blues. They also toured with Morrissey and AFI, performing several headlining tours around the world.

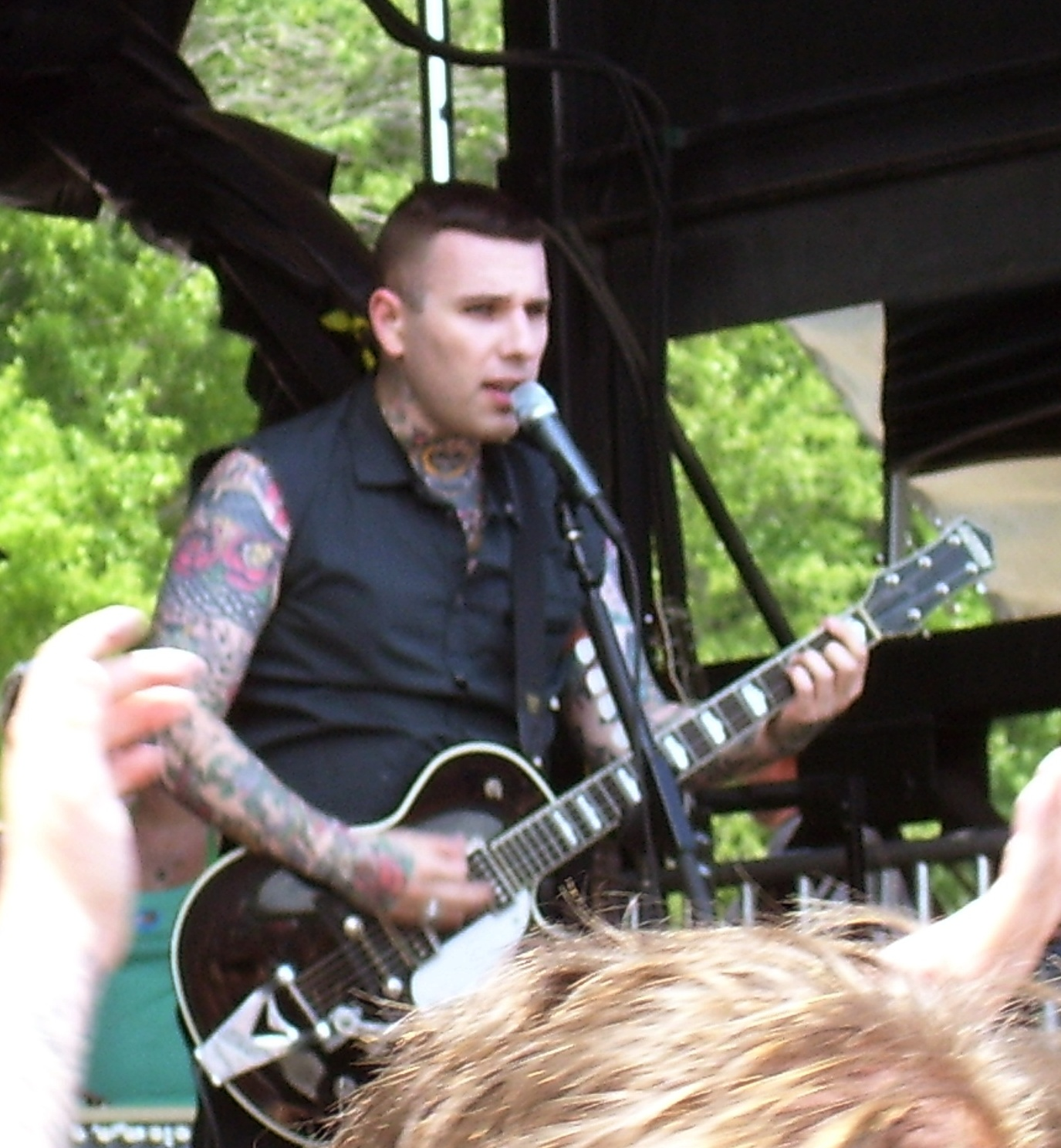
Nick 13 performing at a Warped Tour

Tiger Army made major festival appearances across the US and Europe in support of their fourth album, Music from Regions Beyond. The album was released on June 5, 2007, and was produced by Jerry Finn. "Forever Fades Away" went to No. 1 on Los Angeles rock station KROQ FM, which Tiger Army performed on Jimmy Kimmel Live! and at radio festivals like "BFD". The New York Times called the album "one of the year's best punk albums".

Geoff Kresge returned to Tiger Army in early 2008 and joined Nick 13 and drummer James Meza on tours of the U.S., Canada, Australia, Japan and Europe. The band launched a multi-night festival, Octoberflame, in Southern California in 2008, concluding two years of touring behind Music from Regions Beyond. Nick launched a solo project focused on Americana/country music in 2009, making his first live solo appearance at the Stagecoach Festival in 2010 in Indio, California. On June 7, 2011, Nick 13 released a solo album on Sugar Hill Records. Tiger Army played an anniversary headlining show at the Orange County Fair in 2011 and continued to appear at Octoberflame, as well as in cities like Las Vegas, San Diego, Tempe, Costa Mesa and the MusInk Festival.

In June 2014, Nick 13 announced that a new Tiger Army album was being written, preventing them from playing Octoberflame that year. Drummer Mike Fasano played as a guest drummer on tracks from Ghost Tigers Rise at 2015's Octoberflame, then joined the band full time. Tiger Army released its fifth studio album, V •••–, on May 20, 2016, on Luna Tone Records/Rise Records. Dave Roe played upright bass on the album, then was replaced by Djordje Stijepovic for the 2018 three-song EP, Dark Paradise, which features covers of Lana Del Rey's "Dark Paradise" and the Chantays' instrumental "Pipeline".

Tiger Army's sixth full-length studio album, Retrofuture, was released on September 13, 2019, on Luna Tone Records/Rise Records. The following month, the band played two sold-out shows at the Wiltern Theatre in L.A. for Octoberflame X; supporting acts included Brian Fallon (formerly of the Gaslight Anthem), the Delta Bombers, Wayne Hancock, and 8 Kalacas.

== Band members ==
Current

- Nick 13 – lead vocals, guitar (1996–present)
- Djordje Stijepovic – upright bass, backing vocals (2015–present)
- Mike Fasano – drums, percussion (2004; session musician, 2015–present)

Former

- Geoff Kresge – upright bass, backing vocals (2000–2004, 2008–2014)
- Joel Day – upright bass (1996–1997)
- Adam Carson – drums, percussion (1996–1999, one-off performances 2008, 2012)
- London May – drums, percussion (2000–2001)
- James Meza – drums, percussion (2004–2014)
- Fred Hell – drums, percussion (2002–2004)
- Jeff Roffredo – upright bass (2004–2008)

Former touring musicians

- Joe Fish – drums (1999)
- Rob Peltier – upright bass (1999)

Timeline

== Discography ==
=== Studio albums ===
- 1999: Tiger Army
- 2001: Tiger Army II: Power of Moonlite
- 2004: Tiger Army III: Ghost Tigers Rise – No. 146 US
- 2007: Music from Regions Beyond – No. 49 US
- 2016: V •••– – No. 75 US
- 2019: Retrofuture

=== EPs ===
- 1997: Temptation EP
- 2002: Early Years EP
- 2004: Ghost Tigers EP
- 2018: Dark Paradise EP

=== Compilations ===
- 1997: Punk Fiction Wedge Records "F.T.W"
- 1999: Give 'Em the Boot II HellCat "Nocturnal"
- 2002: Give 'Em the Boot III HellCat "Power of Moonlite"
- 2003: Punk-O-Rama Vol. 8 Epitaph Records "Incorporeal"
- 2004: Give 'Em the Boot IV HellCat "Atomic"
- 2004: Punk-O-Rama Vol. 9 Epitaph Records "Temptation"
- 2005: Punk-O-Rama Vol. 10 Epitaph Records "Ghostfire/Rose of the Devil's Garden video"
- 2005: Give 'Em the Boot DVD HellCat "Never Die"
- 2006: Give 'Em the Boot V HellCat "Swift Silent Deadly"
- 2007: 2007 Warped Tour Compilation Side One Dummy "Afterworld"
- 2007: Give 'Em the Boot VI HellCat "Afterworld"
- 2008: Nightmare Revisited "Oogie Boogie's Song" (bonus track)
