= Bleeding Through =

American metalcore band

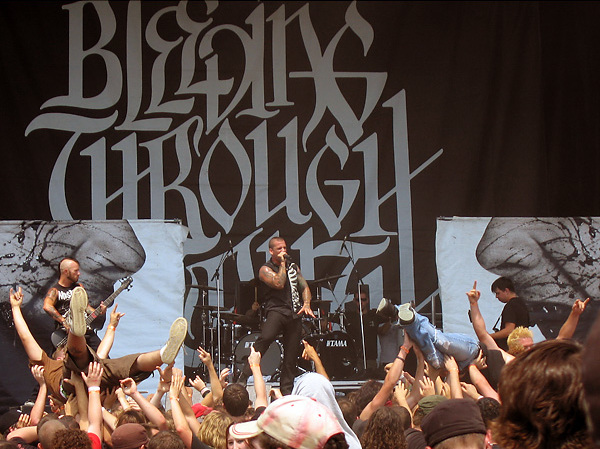
- Bleeding Through performing in 2006

Background information
- Also known as: Breakneck (1998)
- Origin: Orange County, California, U.S.
- Genres: Metalcore; hardcore punk; melodic death metal; symphonic black metal
- Years active: 1999–2014; 2016; 2017–present
- Labels: SharpTone; Rise; Trustkill; Roadrunner; Prime Directive; Indecision; Nuclear Blast
- Spinoff of: Eighteen Visions
- Members: Brandan Schieppati; Derek Youngsma; Marta Demmel; John Arnold; Brandon Richter; Marc Battung
- Past members: Troy Born; Scott Danough; Brian Leppke; Marc Jackson; Chad Tafolla; Vijay Kumar; Molly Street; Ryan Wombacher; Jona Weinhofen; Dave Nassie
- Website: bleedingthroughofficial.com

Bleeding Through is an American metalcore band from Orange County, California, formed in 1999. Influenced largely by hardcore punk and Swedish melodic death metal, the band was established by lead vocalist Brandan Schieppati as a personal project after leaving Throwdown. Schieppati, who also was a member of Eighteen Visions, originally balanced playing with Eighteen Visions and Bleeding Through, recording the independent albums Dust to Ashes (2001) and Portrait of the Goddess (2002) before departing Eighteen Visions to focus on Bleeding Through. The remainder of the band today comprises drummer Derek Youngsma, keyboardist Marta Demmel, and guitarists John Arnold and Brandon Richter. As of 2024, the band have sold more than 400,000 albums worldwide.

In 2003, Bleeding Through signed with Trustkill Records and released their breakthrough album, This Is Love, This Is Murderous. Shortly after the album's release, the band receceived considerable media attention outside of the heavy metal community for their involvement in a van crash accidentally filmed on live television in December 2003. This Love was critically lauded and was followed by The Truth (2006) and Declaration (2008), both through Trustkill.

The release of Declaration was marred by financial hardship and conflicts with Trustkill; following the completion of the touring cycle for the album, the band severed ties with the label and signed to Rise Records in 2009. They released two albums through Rise, Bleeding Through (2010) and The Great Fire (2012), before the group disbanded in 2014. They remained inactive for three years before reuniting in 2017, releasing Love Will Kill All (2018) through SharpTone Records. The band's latest album, Nine, was released on February 14, 2025.

== History ==
=== Dust to Ashes and Portrait of the Goddess (1999–2002) ===
Bleeding Through, a band from Orange County, California, traces its origins back to 1998, when a hardcore punk band named Breakneck was founded by vocalist Brandan Schieppati and guitarist Javier Van Huss, then both of Eighteen Visions. Completing the lineup were guitarist Scott Danough, bass guitarist Chad Tafolla, and drummer Troy Born. Van Huss and Schieppati had also both played guitar in the Orange County band Throwdown. Breakneck played only one live performance, opening for Throwdown, Eighteen Visions, and Adamantium among others. Schieppati, who had replaced Van Huss in Throwdown and was still playing guitar for them at the time of Breakneck's show on top of Eighteen Visions, left Throwdown to focus on fronting his own group after the Breakneck show. Established as a hardcore punk act, Breakneck subsequently began to explore a more metallic musical direction. Eventually, this led the members to feel it necessary to change their band name. The origin of the band's name was explained in an interview as follows: "Well, it is summed up by the explanation that whether black, white, red, brown, yellow, religious preference, straight or gay, we all bleed the same, and we bleed through this life the same. Thus Bleeding Through."

The band undertook many lineup changes in its early days. Van Huss was the first departure; he was briefly replaced by Dave Peters, after which Tafolla switched from playing bass to guitar. The vacant bass position was temporarily replaced by Brandon Conway; Marc Jackson was recruited as the next permanent bassist. Jackson and Danough had previously played in the band Refuge together in the early 1990s. Jackson quit the band before the band began recording their debut album, and added Vijay Kumar as the band's new bassist. The band also established a keyboardist in Molly Street. The band's first album began as a demo comprising five songs using a 4-track recorder in Born's bedroom. At the beginning of the following year, Born left the band, followed the next month by Kumar. Despite these losses, the band released their debut album, Dust to Ashes, on March 25, 2001 through Prime Directive Records. Kumar later reversed course and returned to the band, and Born was quickly replaced by Derek Youngsma, who had previously played with Danough in a band called Daggers.

The band signed a two-album and one-EP contract with Indecision Records in April 2001, less than a month after the release of Dust to Ashes. In August 2001, following the band's first tour, Tafolla left the band and was replaced by Brian Leppke. After completing a tour of the American West Coast with From Autumn to Ashes, the band entered a studio to begin recording their new album around December, with a tour between recording sessions accompanying Throwdown from late December into early January. The record, titled Portrait of the Goddess, was completed in early March 2002, and it was released on April 13. A few days later, Kumar left the group for good, and was replaced by Eighteen Visions' Mick Morris the following month. The band then joined Every Time I Die and Norma Jean for a six-week tour spanning late may through early July, though the band were forced to withdraw from several of the July shows after Schieppati was injured after a show in Newport Beach, California. The band would go on to play at Hellfest later that year. Schieppati opted to pursue Bleeding Through as a priority after completion of Portrait of the Goddess, amicably departing Eighteen Visions in July, followed by Street's replacement with Marta Demmel (then Peterson). (Note: During her career with Bleeding Through, Peterson married Machine Head guitarist Phil Demmel. For consistency in this article, she is referred to by her married name.) Morris eventually returned to Eighteen Visions later that year, and his role in Bleeding Through was filled by Ryan Wombacher.

=== This Is Love, This Is Murderous (2003–2005) ===
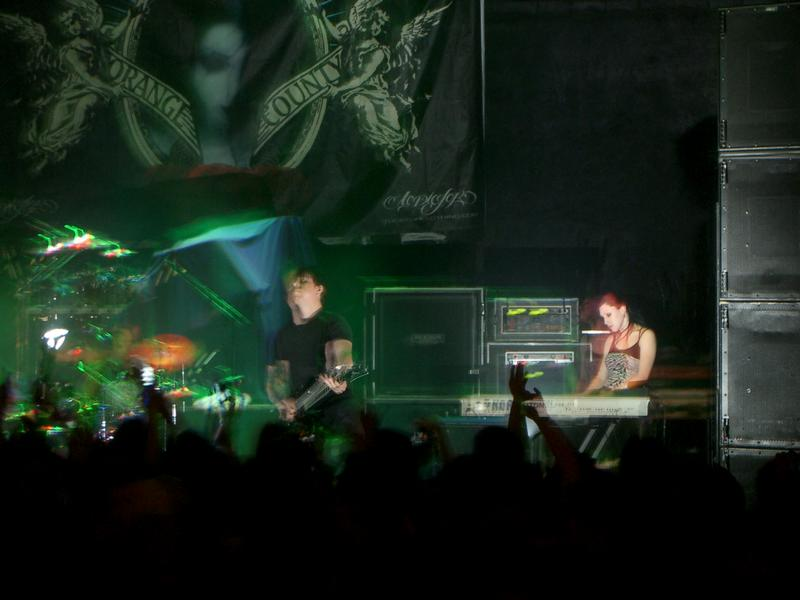
Bleeding Through performing live at New England Metal and Hardcore Festival, 2005

After these two relatively under-distributed albums, Bleeding Through signed to a larger label, Trustkill Records, in 2003. Their third full-length album, the Ulrich Wild-produced This is Love, This is Murderous, was released that September, to generally favorable reviews from critics. It was the band's breakthrough album, with the videos for "Love Lost in a Hail of Gun Fire" and "On Wings of Lead" becoming staples on MTV2's Headbangers Ball and on Fuse TV's Uranium.

The band embarked upon tours across the United States, first opening for AFI, followed by the ill-fated Pure Hatred tour with Chimaira, Soilwork and As I Lay Dying. These dates had propelled the band to national attention not because of the initial reception of their music, but because of an accident captured by live television crews which happened to involve the band. Traveling from Utah to a show in Colorado, the group's tour van hit black ice on the highway, spinning out of control and slamming into a truck that was already flipped over. A mobile TV unit reporting for Salt Lake City's KSL-TV was present to report on another crash, but ended up catching the band's collision on film as their equipment trailer rolled and exploded, showering their instruments and gear across the road. The band escaped with only minor injuries; however, with their gear and vehicle destroyed, the group was forced to drop off the tour. The dramatic televised footage was broadcast everywhere from CNN's Headline News, Good Morning America, NBC News and even The Weather Channel.

The band began 2004 with the Mutilation Tour, which culminated in a sold-out homecoming performance at The Glasshouse in Orange County. This date was captured on a live DVD, titled This Is Live, This Is Murderous. Later that year, the band toured with Ozzfest, sharing the second stage alongside headline act Slipknot and fellow supports Unearth, Lamb of God, Every Time I Die, Hatebreed, Lacuna Coil and Atreyu. They earned the direct support position on MTV2's third Headbangers Ball: The Tour in November, featuring Cradle of Filth, Arch Enemy and Himsa as touring partners. Bleeding Through also contributed their rendition of "Rocket Queen" to the Guns N' Roses tribute album Bring You to Your Knees released by Law of Inertia Records in 2004. A 2005 re-issue of This Is Love, This Is Murderous added three bonus live tracks, "Revenge I Seek", "Rise" and "Our Enemies", two music videos and a ten-minute documentary. Following this, the band embarked upon a European tour in February 2005, supported by Cult of Luna.

=== The Truth (2005–2007) ===
In April, the group entered Cherokee Studios with producer and then-Anthrax guitarist Rob Caggiano. Together, they began work on a new album titled The Truth. As This Is Love, This Is Murderous passed 100,000 sales the US, further touring found the band headlining the second annual Strhess Fest in alliance with Darkest Hour, Zao, Misery Signals, and Fight Paris commencing early July. Upon completion of these gigs the group joined the Warped Tour for a two-week stretch. November saw shows with Day of Contempt, before the group entered the recording studio to record cover versions of Black Flag's "My War", for use on a tribute album, and Unbroken's "Fall On Proverb".

The Truth was released on January 10, 2006, through Trustkill. The band decided to rebuild their sound from the ground up; Danough told Alternative Press that the band's approach involved "Taking out the Metalcore, and then adding the metal into hardcore, if that makes any sense," while Leppke added, "I don't think this album sounds like anything else out there right now. We're very proud of that fact." The album sold 17,000 copies in its first week to enter the Billboard 200 at No. 48, and No. 1 on the Top Independent Albums. To promote the album, the band opened 2006 with US dates throughout February and March backed by Every Time I Die, Between the Buried and Me and Haste the Day. The band also put in a significant appearance on the second stage at the UK's Download Festival in Castle Donington on June 9. On July 18, Bleeding Through appeared on The Tonight Show with Jay Leno. Stand-up comedian Mitch Fatel joined the band for a song.

The group once again played on the second stage at the 2006 Ozzfest, now as part of the year's permanent lineup along with Black Label Society, Unearth, Atreyu and Norma Jean. During days Ozzfest was not performing, Bleeding Through played shows supporting Disturbed, Avenged Sevenfold and Hatebreed. The band members were on a day off from the festival passing through Medford, Oregon, when they pulled into a Taco Bell parking lot to eat. This resulted in a fan recognizing them and then calling over a bunch of his friends. The band talked with the fans, signed autographs, posed for pictures and also asked the kids if there were any shows happening that night they could participate in. They ended up doing a small club concert with local bands, with roughly 150 people in attendance. The show was a benefit with all proceeds going toward cancer research. The band spent November and December 2006 on tour with Saosin and Senses Fail.

Bleeding Through headlined the Darkness Over Europe 2007 Tour with I Killed The Prom Queen, All Shall Perish, and Caliban from February to March. Danough agreed to mutually part ways with the band in April. According to a statement released by the band, Danough and the other members "had grown apart and it was time for both parties to move on". Danough was quickly replaced by Jona Weinhofen of I Killed The Prom Queen – one of several factors that led that band to disband. The band then toured as the opening act for the Slayer and Marilyn Manson summer tour. Following that, the group embarked on a six-week stint across the North America opening for HIM, finishing the touring cycle for The Truth on December 1 and 2, 2007.

=== Declaration and record label issues (2008–2009) ===
In March 2008, Bleeding Through announced Declaration as the title of its fifth studio release, a concept album about the rigors of being away from home. The band's frontman and lyricist Brandan Schieppati explained to Revolver in the magazine's May 2008 issue, "There are definitely places when we're traveling where every time we go there, we're like, 'Fuck, why do we have to be here?' Like, we'll be in France and all of a sudden we'll feel totally insignificant. You get the feeling that people's eyes are just burning a hole through you." The group recorded Declaration in Vancouver with producer Devin Townsend.

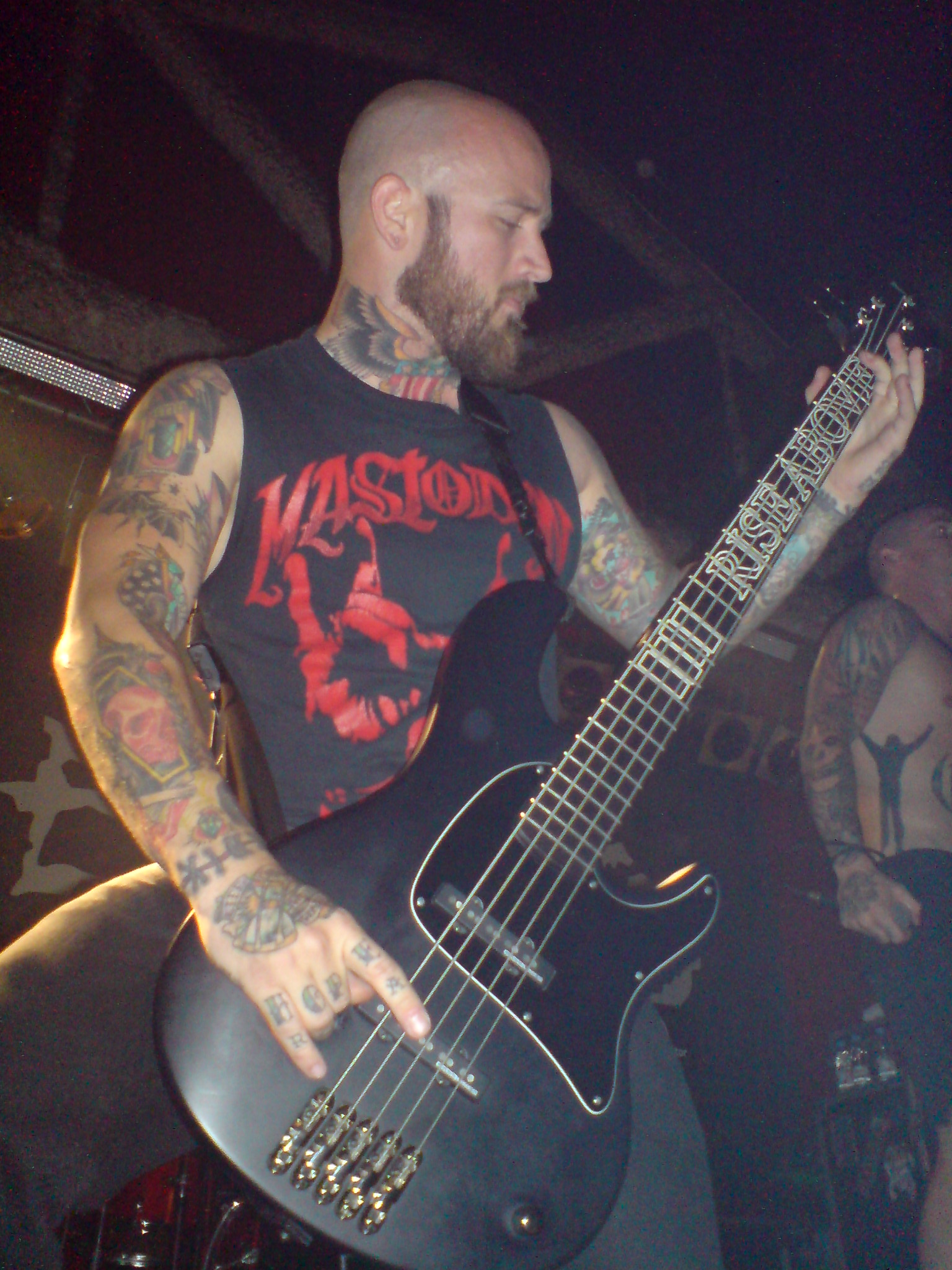
Ryan Wombacher performing live in Barcelona, 2009

On June 6, 2008, the band released a blog on MTV's Headbangers Ball website, addressing numerous disappointments the band had with Trustkill Records. These disappointments included unpaid royalties, lack of funding for Declaration, and an unapproved re-release of The Truth titled The Complete Truth. Despite Trustkill's website saying that the new album, Declaration would be released August 2008, the band stated that they did not intend to hand over the master recording of the album until they were paid the minimum fees required to pay back Townsend, the band's management, and Schieppati's father who loaned the band money for recording. According to the statement, the band had suggested their own vision of an extended re-release of the album over a year prior, but Trustkill owner Josh Grabelle rejected the idea. However, when Trustkill ran into financial difficulties, Grabelle pushed for the re-release without any input from the band in an effort to stabilize. In a follow-up blog on their MySpace page, Bleeding Through stated that "Trustkill Records delivered the funds necessary to complete the album and to compensate everyone who had loaned [us] cash." According to Schieppati, Trustkill was only able to deliver these funds because they had borrowed the money from one of their distributors.

Following the recording of Declaration, the group returned to the United Kingdom for Download Festival, which was held from June 13–15, 2008 at Donington Park. During the festival, vocalist Brandan Schieppati spoke to Rock Sound TV about the group's dispute with its record label. During the conversation, Schieppati revealed that Bleeding Through had been contacted by a number of other record companies since the band went public with its Trustkill feud. In July 2008, the band signed a European distribution deal with Nuclear Blast for the release of Declaration.

The band performed in the No Fear Music Tour with Bullet for My Valentine across the US in August 2008. This included a stop in Mexico City in August as part of the Warped Tour with Underoath and MxPx, which was Bleeding Through's first ever show in Mexico. On September 25, 2008, Machine Head frontman Robb Flynn joined the band on stage at The Warfield in San Francisco, and performed Bleeding Through's song "Revenge I Seek". The next day, Declaration was released in Europe by Nuclear Blast, and a US release followed on September 30 through Trustkill. The album sold under 6,000 copies in the United States in its first week of release, debuting at number 104 on the Billboard 200 chart. The band then accompanied Bullet for My Valentine throughout Europe with Lacuna Coil in November and December. The European tour featured four headlining shows in Russia in December, the band's first performances there.

Bleeding Through co-headlined the Thrash and Burn European Tour with Darkest Hour between April and May 2009. By the end of this tour, Bleeding Through had severed ties with Trustkill. Declaration's main promotional tour, simply titled The Declaration Tour, began after Thrash and Burn. Bleeding Through was supported by As Blood Runs Black, Impending Doom, and the Acacia Strain. In late May 2009, Bleeding Through announced that Weinhofen would be leaving the band, and No Use for a Name guitarist Dave Nassie would replace him. Weinhofen cited that while he loved his time in Bleeding Through, he decided that he should leave the band and return home to Australia with his family and friends. The band then embarked on a special tour of the American west coast in August to celebrate their tenth anniversary. They were supported by Carnifex, Miss May I, and Motionless in White. The band intended to conclude 2009 with a tour alongside Satyricon, Toxic Holocaust, and Chthonic in September and October. However, the band were forced to stop touring halfway through their North American trek and return home due to "some personal / family business that must be attended to immediately." Instead, the band joined Tiger Army on October 31 as a special guest for the closing night of their signature event, Octoberflame.

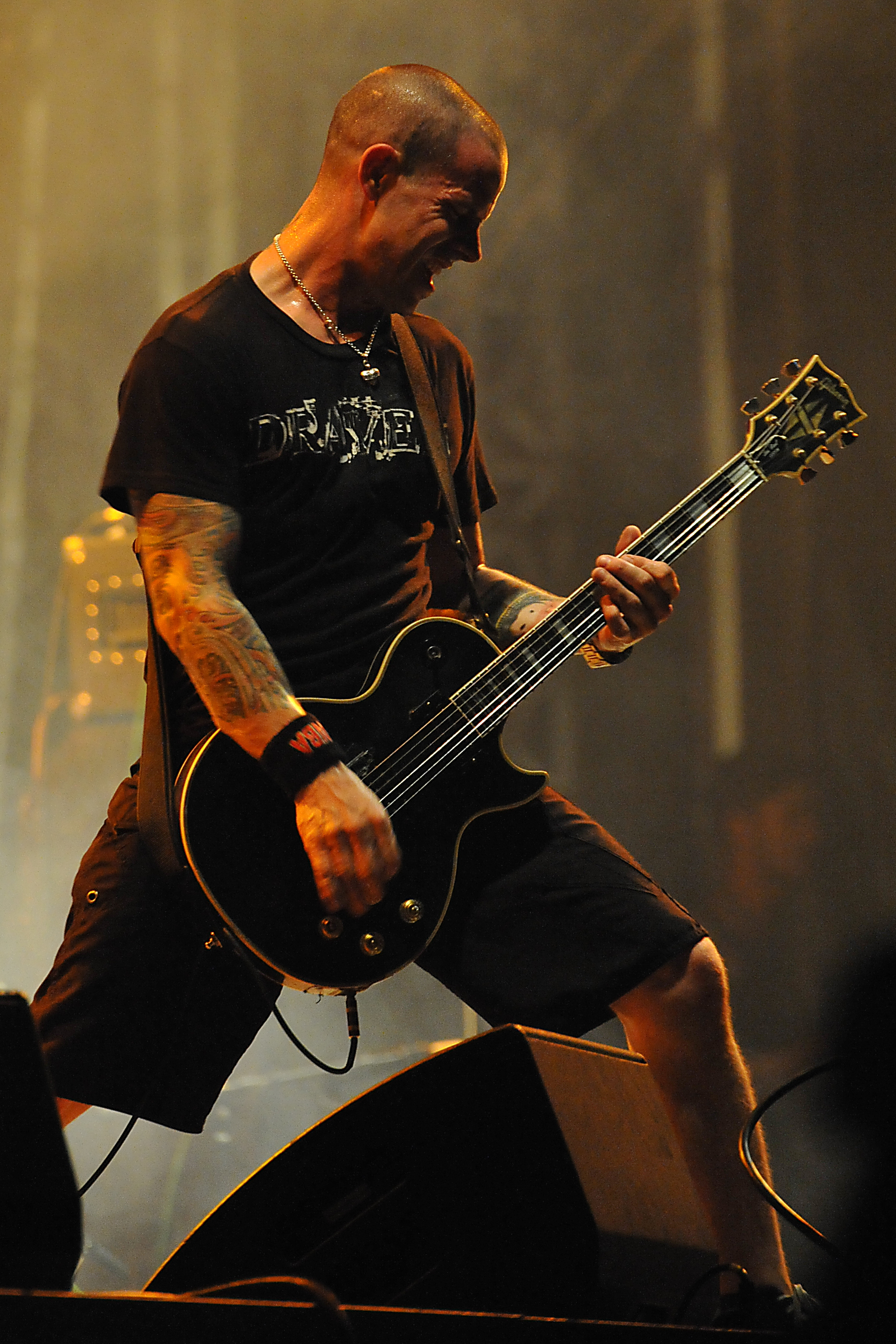
Dave Nassie performing live in Bonn in 2009.

=== Bleeding Through (2009–2010) ===
In early June 2009, Bleeding Through signed a deal with the Portland, Oregon-based independent record label Rise Records. Regarding the band's previous dispute with its former label Trustkill, Schieppati said, "We're very excited to align with a record label that has so much momentum and is growing when many seem to be faltering, dropping bands and firing employees." On October 12, 2009, Bleeding Through issued a statement that they would be starting work on a new album in December, with the goal of releasing it in 2010. The self-titled record was recorded at Planet Z Studios with producer Zeuss. It was released by Rise on April 13, 2010 in North America and internationally through Roadrunner Records. Preceded by the release of two songs, "Anti-Hero" and "Breathing in the Wrath", the album sold 3,700 copies in its first week and debuted at number 143 on the Billboard 200.

Bleeding Through toured heavily throughout 2010, beginning with dates on the European leg of Machine Head's Black Procession Tour alongside Hatebreed and All Shall Perish in January and February. The tour was extended into Japan and Australia, with Crossfaith and Emmure opening the shows in the respective countries. Youngsma did not partake in this leg of the tour, as the birth of his second child was near. His position was filled by Mark Garza, then of the Famine. Bleeding Through followed with their own headlining tour of the US, titled Spring Breakdown, with Born Of Osiris and Sleeping Giant. The tour concluded with an appearance at the California Metalfest festival in Pomona, California, on May 16, 2010.

Following the conclusion of Spring Breakdown, the group filmed a music video for the song "Anti-Hero", released on May 26, 2010. This was followed by a return to Europe supporting the Faceless, including a stop at Graspop Metal Meeting. In August 2010, the group headlined a tour of California with Terror and The Ghost Inside. The following month, they headlined the Anti-Hero Tour across the US with support from For Today and After The Burial. After that, they finished their touring for the year by once again returning to Europe, joining Parkway Drive and Comeback Kid for the Impericon Never Say Die! Tour.

=== The Great Fire, disbandment announcement and final tours (2010–2014) ===
In a November 2010 interview, Wombacher stated Bleeding Through hoped to release their seventh album in the second half of 2011. The band planned to write and record their seventh studio album once they returned from touring for the self-titled album. At that point, the band had not yet chosen a recording studio, and they planned to self-produce the album. After recording the album, Nassie stated in an interview that the recording process was much more comfortable than their last effort, describing it as "totally free-form", adding that "No one was afraid to change something, even down to the last minute. For this record, we were changing things down to the last day of mixing." He also described it as "our strongest record — super-brutal and over-the-top". On November 24, 2011, it was announced that their album, The Great Fire, was complete, though no release date was stated at that time. Produced by Anaal Nathrakh's Mick Kenney, the album was released on January 31, 2012. It was preceded by the release of the song "Faith in Fire" on December 20, 2011, at which point the track listing and cover art was also revealed, followed by the release of "Goodbye to Death" a month later. The album sold 3,000 copies in its first week to debut at number 193 on the Billboard 200 chart. The band supported the album with a six-date headlining tour between January and February 2012 with Upon a Burning Body and Suffokate. The band were due to embark on Demon Hunter's "True Defiance 2012" tour of North America alongside Cancer Bats and the Plot in You in July and August 2012, but were forced to drop out due to Schiepatti requiring emergency orthodontic surgery.

"We became a stepping-stone band; we lost respect from the media, our management, our booking agent…it was like people didn't take us seriously anymore."

— Brandan Schieppati, May 2018

On January 3, 2013, Bleeding Through announced their upcoming tour in Europe would be their last, leading to rumors that the band would be breaking up. This was later confirmed by a statement to Blabbermouth.net from Schieppati, who said that they would disband following a final tour of North America, Europe and Australia. Schieppati reasoned that life events and personal ventures by each of the band members made it impossible to continue Bleeding Through. Demmel later elaborated that the band did not want to operate in a "part-time" capacity, and thus opted to put the band to an end. Schieppati would also later expound upon his reasoning for the band's split years later, saying that from his perspective, Bleeding Through had lost the respect of the music industry.

In February 2013, Bleeding Through announced that Danough would return to the band for the European leg of the tour. In November 2013, Bleeding Through embarked on a farewell tour of North America, supported by Winds Of Plague, Oceano, Gideon and Sworn In. En route to the final show of the tour in Albuquerque, New Mexico—and almost ten years to the date of their van accident on the Pure Hatred tour—the band's van drove off the road and their trailer was totaled. Despite this, no one was injured and the band's performance in the city went ahead as planned. The band's first performance in 2014 was an appearance at New England Hardcore & Metal Fest at the Worcester Palladium on April 17; it was the band's final performance on the American East Coast. In May, the final nine West Coast dates were announced with Winds of Plague and Scars of Tomorrow. The band's final performance came on August 3, 2014, at Chain Reaction in Anaheim, California.

=== Reunion and Love Will Kill All (2018–2022) ===
In December 2015, Bleeding Through reunion rumors began to circulate after a new post surfaced from the band's official Facebook account, which read "Nothing Is Over. 2016". Days later, the band clarified that their return was for one show, and had no further plans. This was a performance in February 2016 on the second night of Friends Fest, a two-day event at Chain Reaction to benefit the medical bills of the Ghost Inside following their tour bus accident.

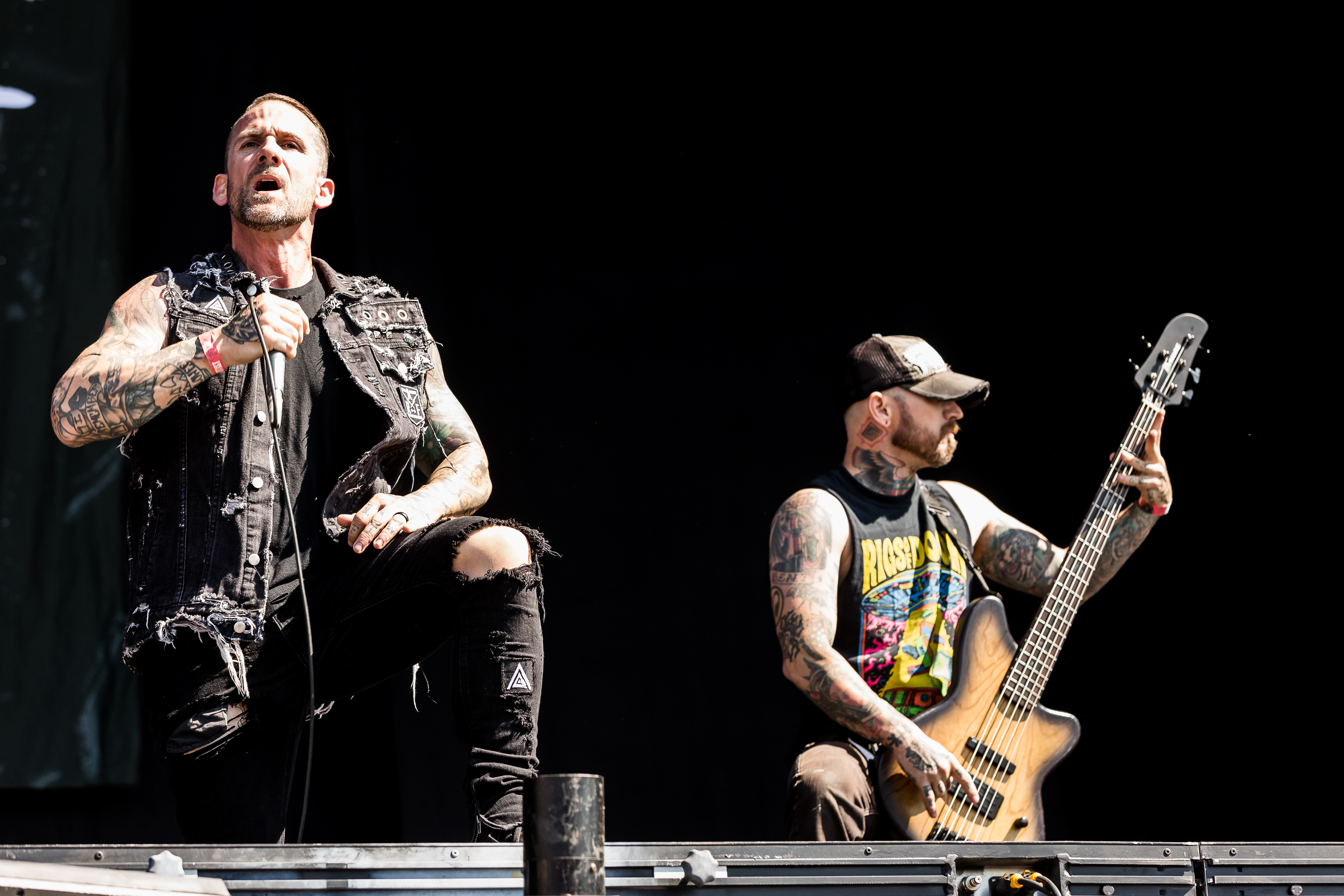
Brandan Schieppati and Ryan Wombacher live at Full Force festival 2019 in Germany

On January 1, SharpTone Records issued a teaser for music they were releasing in 2018 and some listeners apparently recognized vocalist Brandan Schiepatti's voice on their page. On March 28, 2018, the band announced they were returning with a new album, Love Will Kill All, and it would be released on May 25 through SharpTone. According to Schieppati, who suffered from mental health problems and went through a divorce while the band was inactive, much of the album's content revolved around the band's frustrations with the music industry which led to their breakup, as well as with friends he lost during that period, alongside the resulting feelings of isolation. The album's release was preceded by the songs "Set Me Free" on April 6, followed by "Fade into the Ash" on May 11.

The band's first reunion show was a sold-out gig which took place on June 8 at the Observatory in Santa Ana, California. Footage from the video was featured in the music video for the song "No Friends", released on July 4. Among other shows, the band played at festivals to promote the album, including East Coast Tsunami in Reading, Pennsylvania and Texas Revolution in Austin, Texas. In 2019, the band made a stop on the San Diego stop of Hatebreed's 25th anniversary tour, and the Musink Festival in Costa Mesa, California, followed by performances at European festivals that year, including Jera on Air in the Netherlands that June, and With Full Force in Germany. The band performed at the Hell and Heaven Fest in Mexico City in March 2020 at the advent of the COVID-19 pandemic.

=== Rage EP and 20th anniversary of This Is Love... (2022–2023) ===
In November 2020, Schieppati announced the band was working on new material with Kenney. Work progressed slowly over the course of the next 14 months, but the band posted tentative song titles from the studio on their Instagram account in February 2022. On May 20, 2022, a single titled "Rage" was released. This was followed by the surprise release of an extended play of the same name on July 1, 2022. Shortly after the release of the EP, Leppke was replaced by John Arnold. The band promoted the EP with a performance at the revival of Tattoo the Earth as a festival at the Worcester Palladium. In November, the band announced two East Coast dates with the newly-reunited God Forbid in January, followed in December by the announcement of new material in the works. The next week, a West Coast tour from February to April was announced, with Ov Sulfur opening the first three dates.

On April 21, 2023, Bleeding Through released a new song titled "War Time". The band also spent 2023 celebrating the 20th anniversary of This Is Love, This Is Murderous; in July, the band went on a three-date tour of Texas to celebrate the anniversary alongside Unearth, who were celebrating 25 years together as a band. After the band played the first night of Indecision 30, a three-day festival celebrating Indecision Records' 30th anniversary later that month, the band released a re-recorded version of "Love Lost in a Hail of Gun Fire" on August 16, 2023. During the same recording sessions, the band also re-recorded the songs "On Wings of Lead" and "Number Seven with a Bullet". The next three days were spent performing anniversary shows for the album in the American Midwest, followed by back-to-back shows in New York over the first weekend of September. The re-recorded version of "On Wings of Lead" was released later that year on November 24. One final anniversary performance took place on December 16, 2023, at Anaheim's House of Blues.

=== Nine (2024–present) ===
In early 2024, the band began to tease new material. By this point, Brandon Richter had become a guitarist for the band. While working on new material, the band appeared at the United Kingdom's Damnation Festival in February, followed by the remaining two This Is Love... anniversary shows in the Pacific Northwest in March. On May 8, the band released the first song from their ninth studio album, titled "Our Brand Is Chaos"; they appeared at Big Texas Metal Fest in a few weeks later. They once again joined Unearth in June for a Boston date celebrating the 20th anniversary of their album The Oncoming Storm.

The band played a tour of Australia in September 2024, after which Bleeding Through released their album's second single, "Dead But So Alive" on September 17. They returned to the New England Metal and Hardcore Festival a few days later. These shows were the last to feature Wombacher, as he stepped down from performing shows with the band due to back injuries. On November 29, the group announced the upcoming release of the album, titled Nine, alongside the release of a third song, "Path of Our Disease". At that time, the tracklist and cover art were also revealed; the album contains three guest appearances, something the band had not included on an album since Declaration. One of these guests was Andrew Neufeld of Comeback Kid, who was featured on "I Am Resistance", the album's fourth single which was released on January 9, 2025. On February 6, Wombacher announced his permanent departure from the band, citing multiple back injuries which led him to drop from the touring lineup the previous September. He remained on good terms with the rest of the band, and expressed pride in the upcoming album. The album was released on February 14. It received praise from critics and fans alike, celebrating the album's well-rounded sound, improved balance of vocal styles, sharp riffs and its raw, visceral energy. Bleeding Through played multiple American shows and a string of California dates with Unearth in support of the album. They later supported Darkest Hour on a European tour in September and October of that year. On November 29, the group played a show in Anaheim in celebration of the 20th anniversary of The Truth, performing the entire record.

On January 7, 2026, Bleeding Through released a cover of Sick of It All's "We Want The Truth." On February 26, the band revealed they were in the studio working on new material. In April Trustkill Records released a live album of from the band’s performance at The Glass House in Pomona, California on January 23, 2004. On July 3, they made an appearance at Hellfest.

== Musical style and influences ==
Bleeding Through is synonymous with the blending of classic death metal, symphonic black metal and just a taste of the angry energy and do-it-yourself spirit of the hardcore scene.

— The Portsmouth Herald, July 2008

Bleeding Through's music has been described as metalcore, expanding their hardcore punk roots into death metal and black metal territory. Like many metalcore bands, Bleeding Through is influenced by Swedish melodic death metal. It is the most apparent on Dust to Ashes, while with time the band's music gradually became more melodic; The Truth was the most melodic to date at the time of its release, even containing the power ballad "Line in the Sand". A keyboard player was introduced to the band shortly before the band began performing as an unsigned act. According to Danough, "it adds a different element" to their music compared to others in the metalcore scene.

Originally, the band's main influence was the hardcore band Integrity, but the band rapidly diversified into more metallic styles. Danough said that he was influenced by metal and hardcore bands such as At the Gates, Slayer, Cradle of Filth, and Earth Crisis, in addition to Integrity. Schieppati has mentioned American thrash metal bands as an influence on Bleeding Through, such as Testament or Exodus. In an interview, guitarist Brian Leppke added Cro-Mags, Entombed, Crowbar and Pantera to the list of influences. The keyboards presented by Marta Demmel incorporate industrial and gothic inspirations to the band's sound, and this unconventional approach led to association with black metal influences.

Although the band was often labeled as simply metalcore, when Schieppati was asked if he considered Bleeding Through a hardcore band, he said: "I think we're a hardcore band and I'll never say we are a metal band, we're all hardcore kids and we came from the hardcore scene. Ours is just a different version of hardcore, we're trying to do something which adds a different variety to the hardcore scene, which has been sounding the same way for so long."

== Band members ==
Current

- Brandan Schieppati – lead vocals (1999–2014, 2017–present)
- Derek Youngsma – drums, percussion (2001–2014, 2017–present)
- Marta Demmel – keyboards, backing vocals (2002–2014, 2017–present)
- John Arnold – guitar (2022–present)
- Brandon Richter – guitar (2023–present)
- Marc Battung – bass (2025–present)

Former

- Javier Van Huss – guitar (1999)
- Dave Peters – guitar (1999)
- Scott Danough – guitar (1999–2007; touring 2013–2014)
- Molly Street – keyboards (2000–2002)
- Brian Leppke – guitar (2001–2014, 2017–2022)
- Jona Weinhofen – guitar (2007–2009)
- Dave Nassie – guitar (2009–2014)
- Troy Born – drums (1999–2001)
- Chad Tafolla – bass (1999), guitar (1999–2001)
- Marc Jackson – bass (1999–2000)
- Vijay Kumar – bass (2000–2001, 2002)
- Mick Morris – bass (2002, died 2013)
- Ryan Wombacher – bass, backing vocals (2002–2014, 2017–2025)
- Mark Garza – drums (2010; touring)

== Discography ==
Studio albums

- Dust to Ashes (2001)
- Portrait of the Goddess (2002)
- This is Love, This is Murderous (2003)
- The Truth (2006)
- Declaration (2008)
- Bleeding Through (2010)
- The Great Fire (2012)
- Love Will Kill All (2018)
- Nine (2025)

== Awards and nominations ==
Year	Award	Nominee / work	Category	Result
2009	Revolver Golden Gods Awards	Marta Peterson	Hottest Chick In Metal	Won
2009	Revolver Golden Gods Awards	Bleeding Through	My Space Readers Choice	Nominated
2012	Orange County Music Awards	Bleeding Through	Best Metal band	Nominated
