= This Is Love, This Is Murderous =

Studio album by Bleeding Through
- Released: September 23, 2003
- Recorded: 2003
- Studio: World Class Audio in Anaheim, CA
- Genres: Metalcore; melodic death metal
- Length: 45:02
- Label: Trustkill
- Producer: Ulrich Wild

Bleeding Through chronology
Portrait of the Goddess (2002)	This Is Love, This Is Murderous (2003)	This Is Live, This Is Murderous (2004)

This Is Love, This Is Murderous is the third studio album by American metalcore band Bleeding Through released in 2003. It is their Trustkill Records debut. It has sold more than 125,000 copies since its release.

== Background ==
Bleeding Through signed with Trustkill records in January of 2003.

Audio clips in the beginnings of "Love Lost in a Hail of Gunfire" and "Revenge I Seek" were taken from the cult movie The Boondock Saints.

Music videos were made for the songs "Love Lost in a Hail of Gun Fire" and "On Wings of Lead". "Love Lost in a Hail of Gun Fire" is also available in a censored form on the MTV2 Headbanger's Ball: Volume 2 collection (this is the same edit as the video version). The song "Shadow Walker" is a re-recorded version of a song from the band's debut album Dust to Ashes.

On August 16, 2023, the band released a re-recorded version of "Love Lost in a Hail of Gun Fire" to commemorate the album's 20th anniversary. During the same recording sessions, the band also re-recorded the songs "On Wings of Lead" and "Number Seven with a Bullet". The re-recorded version of "On Wings of Lead" was released later that year on November 24.

== Critical reception ==
Professional ratings
Review scores
Source	Rating
AllMusic	3/5 stars
Punknews.org	3/5 stars
Inside Pulse	Positive
Lollipop Magazine	Positive
Burnyourears.de	Positive

The album received mostly positive reviews, with Inside Pulse writing “It is a great addition to any hardcore or metal fan’s collection. There are slight problems overall with the release, but it’s a strong outing nonetheless.” Adrian Bromley writing for Lollipop Magazine gave a positive review stating “This Is Murderous, Bleeding Through showcases a knack for assembling intriguingly heavy numbers with atmosphere and melody. Metalrage noted a mixing of their hardcore roots with many different styles, from death metal to metal to some gothic samples. The guitars feature a mainly hardcore sound, while the drums are more death metal oriented. Adrian Bromley praised Brandan Schieppati's vocal patterns as "a nice change of pace". The lyrics touch upon anger, hatred, agony, and a desire for revenge. In 2020 the album was named to Metal Hammer's top 20 best metalcore albums of all time.

== Track listing ==
No.	Title	Length
1.	"Love Lost in a Hail of Gun Fire"	4:57
2.	"Sweet Vampirous"	1:24
3.	"Number Seven with a Bullet"	5:07
4.	"On Wings of Lead"	5:21
5.	"What I Bleed Without You"	3:03
6.	"This Is Love, This Is Murderous"	4:30
7.	"City of the Condemned" (featuring Ryan J. Downey)	3:23
8.	"Mutilation"	3:45
9.	"Murder by Numbers"	3:30
10.	"Dead Like Me"	3:28
11.	"Shadow Walker"	2:01
12.	"Revenge I Seek"	4:21
Total length:		45:02

The album was re-released on January 25, 2005, in a limited-edition double-disc format. It includes special O-Card packaging and the following extras on the second disc:

=== Music videos ===
Title	Year
"Love Lost in a Hail of Gun Fire"	2003
"On Wings of Lead"	2003

=== Three live tracks ===
No.	Title	Length
1.	"Revenge I Seek"	4:21
2.	"Our Enemies"	3:23
3.	"Rise"	2:06

=== Documentary ===
- 10-minute documentary with never-before-seen interviews with the band.

== Personnel ==
Bleeding Through

- Brandan Schieppati - vocals, guitar
- Scott Danough - guitar
- Brian Leppke - guitar
- Marta Peterson - keyboards
- Ryan Wombacher - bass
- Derek Youngsma - drums

Guest musicians

- Ryan J. Downey - vocals on "City Of The Condemned" (Burn It Down, ex-Hardball, ex-Time In Malta)
- Molly Street - credited keyboards
- Case One - vocal group
- Mike Milford - vocal group (Scars Of Tomorrow, The Artery Foundation)

Artwork and design

- Jeff Gros - photography
- Heather Finch - model
- Jeff Gros - photography
- Don Clark - layout design
- Ryan Wilson - model, vocal group
- Shalon Wyllie - road crew
- Biggie - road crew

Production

- Ulrich Wild - Producing, Mixing & Mastering @ Giant Peach Compound
- Shawn Sullivan - Recording @ World Class Audio
- R Dub - road crew
- Shawn Sullivan - engineer

== Charts ==
Chart (2003)	Peak position
US Top Heatseekers	45
US Top Independent Albums	43
