= If You Say So (disambiguation) =

"If You Say So" is a 2014 song by Lea Michele.

If You Say So may also refer to:

- Tu Kahe Agar (lit. 'If You Say So'), a 2002 Indian TV series

== Music ==
=== Albums ===
- If You Say So, album by Elsten Torres Uno Entertainment, 2008
- If You Say So, EP by Paige (band)

=== Songs ===
- "If You Say So", song by Mike Stern from Odds or Evens, 1991
- "If You Say So", song by American band Samiam from You Are Freaking Me Out, 1997
- "If You Say So", song by Fulano de Tal from Etc. (Fulano de Tal album), 2000
- "If You Say So", song by The Dear & Departed from Something Quite Peculiar, 2007
- "If You Say So", song by Errol Dunkley, 1974
