= Underworld: Rise of the Lycans =

2009 film directed by Patrick Tatopoulos

- Theatrical release poster
- Directed by: Patrick Tatopoulos
- Screenplay by: Danny McBride; Dirk Blackman; Howard McCain
- Story by: Len Wiseman; Robert Orr; Danny McBride
- Based on: Characters by: Kevin Grevioux; Len Wiseman; Danny McBride
- Produced by: Tom Rosenberg; Gary Lucchesi; Len Wiseman; Richard Wright
- Starring: Michael Sheen; Bill Nighy; Rhona Mitra; Steven Mackintosh; Kevin Grevioux
- Cinematography: Ross Emery
- Edited by: Peter Amundson; Eric Potter
- Music by: Paul Haslinger
- Production companies: Screen Gems; Lakeshore Entertainment; Sketch Films
- Distributed by: Sony Pictures Releasing
- Release dates: January 22, 2009 (ArcLight Hollywood); January 23, 2009 (United States)
- Running time: 89 minutes
- Country: United States
- Language: English
- Budget: $35 million
- Box office: $91.4 million

Underworld: Rise of the Lycans is a 2009 American action horror film directed by Patrick Tatopoulos from a screenplay by Danny McBride, Dirk Blackman, Howard McCain, based on a story by Len Wiseman, Robert Orr, and McBride. It is a prequel to Underworld (2003) and the third installment in the Underworld film series. The film stars Michael Sheen, Bill Nighy, Rhona Mitra, Steven Mackintosh, and Kevin Grevioux. The plot focuses primarily on the origins of the characters and the events that lead up to the Vampire–Lycan war. Kate Beckinsale, who starred in the previous Underworld films, appears briefly at the end of the film.

Underworld: Rise of the Lycans premiered at the ArcLight Hollywood in Los Angeles, California on January 22, 2009, and was released in the United States on January 23, by Sony Pictures Releasing. The film received generally negative reviews from critics and grossed over $91 million against its production budget of $35 million.

The film was followed by Underworld: Awakening, in 2012, serving as a direct sequel to Underworld: Evolution (2006).

== Plot ==
Two decades have passed since a war began between a legion of vampires and the first clan of werewolves, a breed unable to take human form. Lucian is the first werewolf born capable of taking human form and the first to be called a Lycan. Viktor, a vampire elder, raises the child, envisioning a race of Lycan slaves guarding the coven's fortress during the day and working as laborers for the vampires at night. The countryside is filled with savage werewolves born from William's rampage, and human nobles beg Viktor for protection against the beasts: he grants it in exchange for tributes of silver, which enables him to keep his slaves under control. As Lucian grows up, he and Viktor's daughter Sonja fall in love, and in their adult years they begin a secretive intimate relationship. Sonja is reckless and insubordinate, and one night Lucian escapes the shackles preventing him from turning werewolf and rescues Sonja from his werewolf brethren. Despite acknowledging that Lucian rescued his daughter, Viktor cannot forgive the escape and has Lucian whipped and imprisoned.

By trading her seat on the vampire council, Sonja enlists the help of Andreas Tanis in orchestrating Lucian's release. Lucian, unable to flee alone, liberates the other Lycans as he escapes. Sonja remains, planning to meet Lucian in three days. As she prepares to leave she is visited by her father. Viktor asks if she assisted in Lucian's escape: she denies it, but he discovers the truth by biting her neck and reading her memories through her blood. Discovering her relationship with Lucian, he imprisons her. Lucian recruits both human slaves and werewolves to build a force against the vampires. In the fortress, the vampire council and nobles demand that Viktor recapture Lucian, as his Lycans have been attacking human estates, freeing their slaves and offering them immortality as Lycans themselves. Viktor replies that he is confident Lucian will return as he has something Lucian wants: Sonja.

Lucian learns about Sonja's imprisonment and rescues her from her room, but they are stopped from escaping by Viktor. Sonja, hoping to spare Lucian's life, reveals to Viktor that she is pregnant with Lucian's child. Disgusted, Viktor overpowers her and imprisons both her and Lucian. Sonja is unanimously sentenced to death by the council at a trial presided over by her father, and is executed by exposure to sunlight in Lucian's presence.

An enraged and heartbroken Lucian turns werewolf, but his attempt to escape the fortress is thwarted by the Death Dealers. He is able to communicate with and control the wild werewolves, however, and summons them to storm the fortress. A melee ensues in which vampire council members, their aides and lesser vampire nobles are killed. Realizing that Viktor intends to flee, Lucian pursues him and they fight. Lucian traps Viktor by exposing him to shafts of sunlight and then stabs him through the mouth with a sword and pushes his body down into a nearby body of water. With the battle over, Lucian's deputy Raze declares that "it is finished", but Lucian knows this victory is only the beginning of what will become a war between the races. On a vampire ship fleeing the fortress, Viktor is revealed to have survived his wound and is sealed in an elder hibernation chamber by Tanis.

The opening scene of the first Underworld film is then shown with the voice of vampire Kraven revealing to Selene that it was Viktor who killed her family, not the Lycans. Kraven adds that Viktor spared Selene's life because she reminded him of his executed daughter Sonja. Selene, unaware of the truth, dismisses Kraven's statement as "lies".

== Cast ==
- Michael Sheen as Lucian
  - Alexander Carroll as Young Lucian
- Bill Nighy as Viktor
- Rhona Mitra as Sonja
  - Olivia Taylforth as Young Sonja
- Steven Mackintosh as Andreas Tanis
- Kevin Grevioux as Raze
- David Aston as Coloman
- Elizabeth Hawthorne as Orsova
- Craig Parker as Sabas
- Larry Rew as Kosta
- Jared Turner as Xristo
- Timothy Raby as Janosh
- Tania Nolan as Luka
- Geraldine Brophy as Nobleman's Wife
- Leighton Cardno as Fearful Lycan
- Jason Hood as Death Dealer
- Mark Mitchinson as Nobleman
- Peter Tait as Gyorg
- Eleanor Williams as Teenage Girl
- Edwin Wright as Death Dealer Captain
- Brian Steele as Big Lycan
- Kate Beckinsale as Selene, a Death Dealer (Cameo) / (archival footage); voiceover"
- Shane Brolly as Kraven Archive audio

== Production ==
In September 2003, shortly after the release of Underworld, production companies Screen Gems and Lakeshore planned to release a prequel as the third film following Underworld's sequel, Underworld: Evolution (2006). Kate Beckinsale, who portrayed Selene in Underworld, expressed interest in reprising her role for the sequel and the prequel.

In December 2005, Underworld: Evolution director Len Wiseman explained that the Underworld franchise was originally conceived as a trilogy. Wiseman said, "We sort of mapped out an entire history and story... a massive collection of ideas and stories that we're putting out at certain times." Wiseman anticipated creating a third installment for the franchise based on the audience's reception of Underworld: Evolution, which would be released the following month.

In a June 2006 interview, Wiseman said, "The third film is going to be a prequel. It will be the origin story and we find out things we didn't know about Lucian; he'll have a much bigger part in it. It will be about the creation [of the races] and what started the war. It will be a period piece. The film will also focus for the first time through the Lycans' point of view." The director also shared, "In terms of the writing, a lot of the writing has been done. We've been developing Underworld 3 for a while. I won't be directing Underworld: Rise of the Lycans; I'm just going to be producing and writing." When asked if Kate Beckinsale would reprise her role as Selene in the prequel, Wiseman said, "It will be in the time period before, but it will overlap into the creation of her as well. We're in the process of seeing how far we go with that." The following October, actor Michael Sheen, who portrays Lucian in the film series, expressed interest in being part of the prequel.

== Reception ==
=== Box office ===
Underworld: Rise of the Lycans was distributed to 2,942 theatres on its opening day (23 January 2009) in the United States and grossed an estimated US$8,050,000, debuting at number 1 at the box office. On its opening weekend, the film was ranked second at the box office behind Paul Blart: Mall Cop with $20.7 million, which is lower than the amount earned by Underworld and Underworld: Evolution ($21.8 million and $26.9 million respectively) on their opening weekends. 59% of the audience at the premiere was male, while 55% was over 25 years old. Overall, the limited day-and-date launch of Rise of the Lycans in the week ending 23 January 2009 accumulated $3.5 million in two dozen markets outside the US, at 455 theatres, a third of which was earned at the Australian box office. In the United Kingdom, the film was distributed to 339 theatres and obtained $1.4 million at the box office on its opening day, ranking as the second-best opener of the week behind Valkyrie. As of 26 April 2009, the film has grossed an estimated $45,802,315 in North America and $92,100,370 at the box office worldwide.

=== Critical reception ===
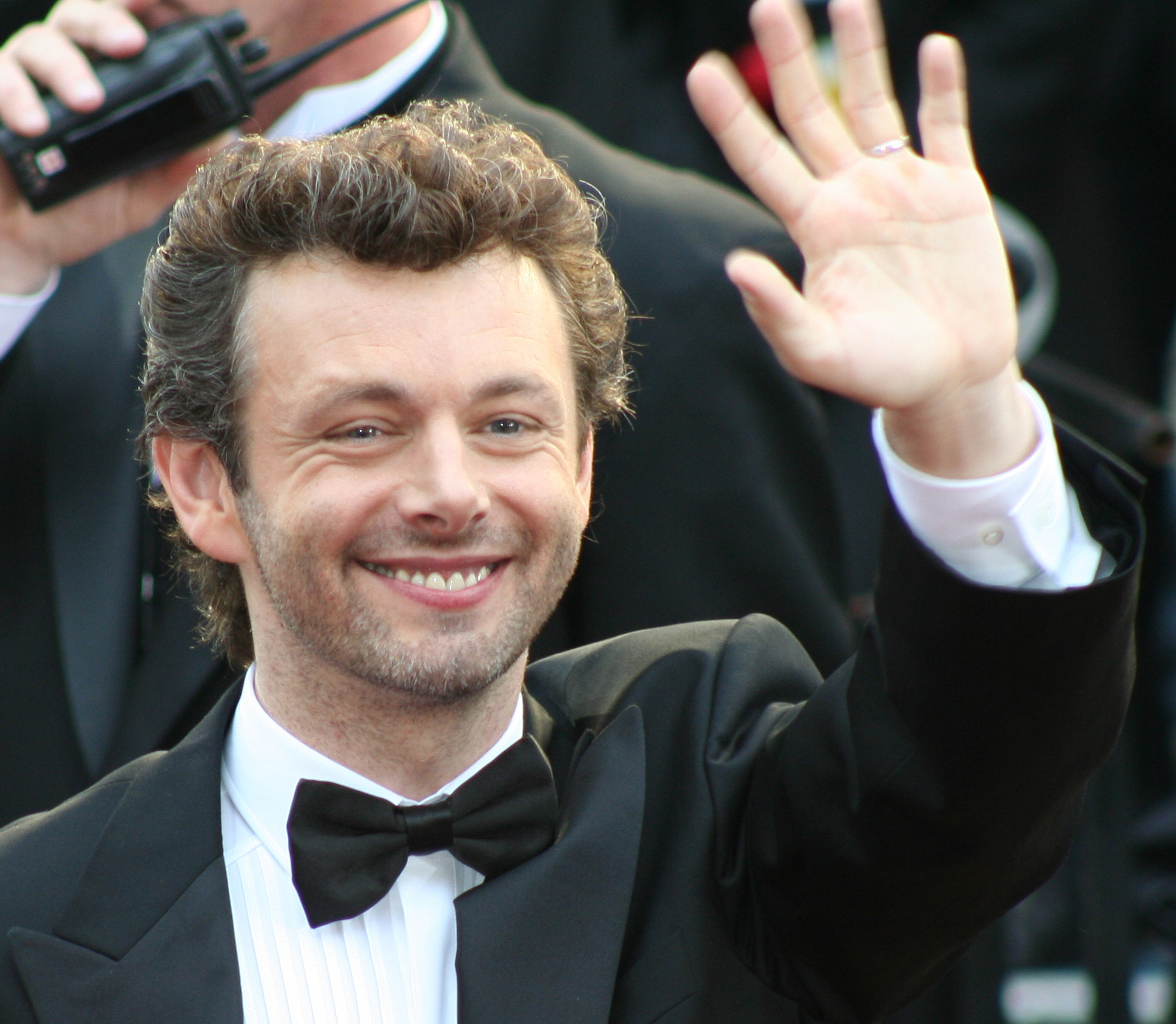
Michael Sheen's performance was particularly lauded by critics.

Underworld: Rise of the Lycans received mostly mixed reviews, and most of the acclaim is attributed to Michael Sheen's performance. According to the review aggregate website Rotten Tomatoes, as of January 2012, 29% of critics gave the film positive reviews based on 76 reviews. The site's consensus reads, "Despite the best efforts of its competent cast, Underworld: Rise of the Lycans is an indistinguishable and unnecessary prequel." At the website Metacritic the film has received an average score of 44, based on 14 reviews. Audiences polled by CinemaScore gave the film an average grade of "B+" on an A+ to F scale.

Joe Leydon of Variety gave a positive review, stating that director Patrick Tatopoulos "offers a satisfyingly exciting monster rally that often plays like a period swashbuckler" and that the film is "notably less frenetic (and appreciably more coherent) than its predecessors". He also praised the lead actors for their performances. Leydon felt that Michael Sheen "hits all the right notes in a star-powered performance that will amuse, if not amaze, anyone who only knows the actor as Tony Blair or David Frost", and that Bill Nighy "offers a sly and stylish turn as Viktor". Similarly, Michael Rechtshaffen of The Hollywood Reporter stated that the film "rises to the occasion" and that it "finds more life left than would be expected in the darkly stylized if dramatically flawed vampires vs. werewolves saga." He credited this to the "sturdy performances" of Sheen and Nighy and the "tidy, unfussy direction" by Tatopoulos. Also giving the film a positive review was Claudia Puig of USA Today, who thought that the film was "surprisingly campy fun, mostly succeeding through the power of its lead performances". Manohla Dargis of The New York Times commented that the film "offers few surprises other than Mr. Sheen's vigorous, physical performance", articulating that Sheen is "the movie's greatest asset" and that his commitment to his role demonstrated that there is "some benefit to having a real performance even in a formulaic entertainment like this".

Clark Collis of Entertainment Weekly gave the film a C+ grade, describing the film as "basically Were-Spartacus, though that makes the humorless, scare-free result sound much more fun than it is". He says, "Sheen and Nighy do their best with the material, but this is easily the worst Underworld so far." While he described the franchise as "grimly competent", Glenn Whipp of Los Angeles Times criticized Rise of the Lycans on its action sequences, which "accent incomprehensibility". Kim Newman of Empire rated the film one out of five stars and called it a "needless threequel", saying that it is unlikely for an audience who has not seen Underworld to "follow the tosh this passes off as a plot". He adds, "In former effects man Patrick Tatopoulos' vision, these Dark Ages were really dark – so dark, in fact, you can barely see the monster action or register why Sheen and Nighy felt the need to sign up." Richard Corliss of Time described the film as "sluggish when it's not grinding toward the preposterous" and that it "just wasn't that memorable". He noted further that the "Brit cast attempts to camouflage the silliness by swanning it up, as if the Royal Shakespeare Company had gotten communally drunk and staged an impromptu production of Dracula Meets the Wolfman."

== Home video ==
Underworld: Rise of the Lycans was released on DVD, Blu-ray, and UMD on May 12, 2009. The DVD is a one-disc set that includes:

- Underworld: Rise of the Lycans — From Script to Screen featurette
- The Origin of the Feud featurette
- Re-Creating the Dark Ages — The Look of Underworld: Rise of the Lycans featurette
- William Control's "Deathclub" music video
- Filmmakers' commentary

Note: The Blu-ray release contained a PS3 theme.

First week sales of the DVD stand at 1,241,875 copies with over $24.82 million in revenue. As of November 1, 2009, almost 2.2 million copies have been sold and $43,407,017 in revenue generated for Sony Pictures.

== Adaptations ==
Kevin Grevioux adapted the story into a two-issue mini-series for IDW Publishing.

== Music ==
=== Soundtrack ===
Underworld: Rise of the Lycans (Original Motion Picture Soundtrack)

Soundtrack album by Various
- Released: January 20, 2009
- Genres: Industrial rock; electronic body music
- Length: 63:49
- Label: Lakeshore
- Producers: Skip Williamson; Brain McNelis

No.	Title	Writer(s)	Artist(s)	Length
1.	"Lighten Up Francis" (JLE Dub Mix)	Maynard Keenan; Tim Alexander	Puscifer	4:34
2.	"Underneath the Stars" (Renholdër Remix)	The Cure; Words by: Robert Smith	The Cure featuring Maynard James Keenan, Puscifer and Milla	3:36
3.	"Nasty Little Perv" (Renholdër Remix)	Perry Farrell; Carl Restivo	Perry Farrell	2:24
4.	"Hole in the Earth" (Renholdër Remix)	Frank Delgado; Abe Cunningham; Chi Cheng; Stephen Carpenter; Chino Moreno	Deftones	3:47
5.	"Miss Murder" (VNV Nation Remix)	Lawrence Burgan; Adam Carson; David Marchand; Jade Puget	AFI	5:59
6.	"Over and Out" (Renholdër Remix)	Daniel Michael Andriano; Derek R. Grant; Matthew Thomas Skiba	Alkaline Trio	3:29
7.	"Deathclub" (Wes Borland/Renholdër Remix)	William Francis	William Control featuring Matt Skiba	3:51
8.	"Board Up the House" (Renholdër Remix)	Genghis Tron	Genghis Tron	4:19
9.	"Stiff Kittens" (JNRSNCHZ Blaqkout Remix)	Davey Havok; Puget	Blaqk Audio	4:59
10.	"Broken Lungs" (Legion of Doom Remix)	Music by: Thrice; Lyrics by: Dustin Kensrue	Thrice	4:48
11.	"Today We Are All Demons" (Beneath the World Mix)	Andy LaPlegua	Combichrist	4:35
12.	"I Want You To"	Borland	Black Light Burns	3:10
13.	"Two Birds, One Stone" (Wes Borland/Renholdër Remix)	Daniel Stillman; Kyle Browning; Daniel Cooper; Daniel Gustavson; Jake Hansen; Jonathan Leary	Drop Dead, Gorgeous	2:56
14.	"Let's Burn"	Daniel John Riddle	King Black Acid	4:28
15.	"Tick Tock Tomorrow" (Wes Borland/Renholdër Remix)		From First to Last	3:47
16.	"Steal My Romance"		Ghosts on the Radio	3:02

=== Score ===
Underworld: Rise of the Lycans (Original Score)

Film score by Paul Haslinger
- Released: March 3, 2009
- Length: 36:12
- Label: Lakeshore
- Producer: Paul Haslinger

No.	Title	Length
1.	"The Rise of the Lycans"	2:27
2.	"Lucian and Sonja's Love Theme"	2:05
3.	"The Arrow Attack"	2:34
4.	"The Most Precious Thing to My Heart"	1:46
5.	"The Wolves' Den"	2:06
6.	"Lucian to the Rescue"	1:51
7.	"Court Battle Suite"	4:25
8.	"Sonja's Trial and Execution"	5:26
9.	"Storming the Castle"	2:53
10.	"Per Aspera Ad Astra"	6:45
11.	"The Rise of the Lycans" (Precious Cargo Remix by Coma Virus)	3:54
Total length:		46:34

== See also ==
- Vampire film
