= Stiff Kittens =

Single by Blaqk Audio

from the album CexCells
- Released: August 2007
- Recorded: 2007
- Genre: Electronica; synthpop
- Length: 3:47
- Label: Interscope
- Songwriters: Davey Havok; Jade Puget
- Producer: Dave Bascombe

Blaqk Audio singles chronology
"Stiff Kittens" (2007)	"Faith Healer" (2012)

"Stiff Kittens" is the first track on Blaqk Audio's debut album CexCells, released on August 14, 2007. On June 13, 2007, "Stiff Kittens" was released on the band's MySpace profile. It is the only single from CexCells.

The title is a tribute reference to the band Joy Division.

== Music video ==
The music video was done and directed by Marc Webb. Webb previously worked with Blaqk Audio members Davey Havok and Jade Puget for AFI's "The Days of the Phoenix", "The Leaving Song Pt. II", "Miss Murder", and "Love Like Winter". In an interview Davey Havok said the video was shot in Marc Webb's basement. While on the talk show Loveline on April 30, 2009, Havok mentioned that it just "didn't work out" and will not be released. Some of the footage was shown during one of their shows while they were on tour and featured Havok in a dark small tunnel-like room. In early 2010 Jade Puget said that the video was never finished.

== Track listing ==
Hot Topic single

1. "Stiff Kittens" – 3:47
2. "Stiff Kittens" (Morel's Pink Noise Mix) – 4:11
3. "Stiff Kittens" (Assemblage 23 Remix) – 6:05
4. "Stiff Kittens" (Jnrsnchz Blaqkout Remix) – 4:59

"Stiff Kittens" Dance Remixes

1. "Stiff Kittens" (Morel's Pink Noise Mix) – 4:11
2. "Stiff Kittens" (Assemblage 23 Remix) – 6:05
3. "Stiff Kittens" (Jnrsnchz Blaqkout Remix) – 4:59
4. "Stiff Kittens" (Jnrsnchz Blaqkblokrok Mix) – 5:04
5. "Stiff Kittens" (Morel's Pink Noise Dub Mix) – 6:52
6. "Stiff Kittens" (Jnrsnchz Blaqkout Instrumental) – 4:59

Other remixes

1. "Stiff Martyr '08" (Illuminoids Depeche Mode Fusion) – 4:39
2. "Stiff Martyr" (Illuminoids Depeche Mode Fusion) – 4:30
3. "Only Stiff Kittens" (SolaceRED Blaqknails Remix) - 5:04

"Stiff Kittens" (Jnrsnchz Blaqkout Remix) was featured on the soundtrack of the movie Underworld: Rise of the Lycans.

== Charts ==
Chart performance for "Stiff Kittens"
Chart (2007)	Peak position
US Alternative Airplay (Billboard)	20
US Dance Club Songs (Billboard)	38
