= XTRMST =

American hardcore punk band

- Origin: Los Angeles, California, United States
- Genres: Hardcore punk; metalcore
- Years active: 2012–2015
- Label: Dim Mak
- Spinoff of: AFI
- Past members: Davey Havok; Jade Puget; Chris Sorenson; Josh James; Val Saucedo
- Website: xtrmst.com

XTRMST was an American straight edge hardcore punk band featuring Davey Havok and Jade Puget of AFI. XTRMST was Havok and Puget's second side project together, after their electronic project Blaqk Audio. They released their debut album XTRMST in 2014 on long-time friend Steve Aoki's Dim Mak Records. Havok and Puget later added Chris Sorenson (Saosin) on bass, Josh James (Stick to Your Guns, Evergreen Terrace, Casey Jones) on guitar, and Val Saucedo (Loma Prieta, Punch) on drums.

The band ultimately played two live shows in early 2015: One at the Roxy in West Hollywood, and one at The Observatory in Santa Ana. The project became inactive in 2015 and has not been revisited since, with each member returning to their main bands.

== Band members ==
- Davey Havok – lead vocals (2012–2015)
- Jade Puget – lead guitar (2012–2015)
- Josh James – rhythm guitar (2014–2015)
- Chris Sorenson – bass (2014–2015)
- Val Saucedo – drums (2014–2015)

== Discography ==
=== Albums ===
==== Studio albums ====
Title	Album details
XTRMST	Released: November 17, 2014 (U.S.); Label: Dim Mak; Format: CD, digital download, LP

==== Extended plays ====
Title	Album details
XTRMST	Released: March 10, 2014; Label: Self-released; Format: Cassette, digital download

=== Singles ===
Title	Year	Album
"Conformist"	2014	XTRMST
"Dirty Nails"	2014	XTRMST
"Exterminate"	2014	XTRMST

=== Non-album tracks ===
Title	Year
"Little King"	2014

=== Music videos ===
Title	Year	Director(s)
"Conformist"	2014	Djay Brawner
