= List of Billboard number-one electronic albums of 2007 =

These are the albums that reached number one on the Billboard Dance/Electronic Albums chart in 2007.

== Chart history ==
Key
†	Indicates best-performing album of 2007

Issue date	Album	Artist	Reference
January 6	St. Elsewhere †	Gnarls Barkley	
January 13	St. Elsewhere †	Gnarls Barkley	
January 20	St. Elsewhere †	Gnarls Barkley	
January 27	St. Elsewhere †	Gnarls Barkley	
February 3	ThriveMix03	DJ Skribble and Vic Latino	
February 10	The Good, the Bad & the Queen	The Good, the Bad & the Queen	
February 17	The Good, the Bad & the Queen	The Good, the Bad & the Queen	
February 24	St. Elsewhere †	Gnarls Barkley	
March 3	St. Elsewhere †	Gnarls Barkley	
March 10	St. Elsewhere †	Gnarls Barkley	
March 17	St. Elsewhere †	Gnarls Barkley	
March 24	Pocket Symphony	Air	
March 31	Pocket Symphony	Air	
April 7	Sound of Silver	LCD Soundsystem	
April 14	Sound of Silver	LCD Soundsystem	
April 21	Sound of Silver	LCD Soundsystem	
April 28	Elements of Life	Tiësto	
May 5	Elements of Life	Tiësto	
May 12	Elements of Life	Tiësto	
May 19	Elements of Life	Tiësto	
May 26	Volta	Björk	
June 2	Volta	Björk	
June 9	Volta	Björk	
June 16	Volta	Björk	
June 23	Volta	Björk	
June 30	Volta	Björk	
July 7	Volta	Björk	
July 14	Volta	Björk	
July 21	Volta	Björk	
July 28	Cross	Justice	
August 4	We Are the Night	The Chemical Brothers	
August 11	We Are the Night	The Chemical Brothers	
August 18	We Are the Night	The Chemical Brothers	
August 25	We Are the Night	The Chemical Brothers	
September 1	CexCells	Blaqk Audio	
September 8	Kala	M.I.A.	
September 15	Kala	M.I.A.	
September 22	Kala	M.I.A.	
September 29	Kala	M.I.A.	
October 6	Kala	M.I.A.	
October 13	Kala	M.I.A.	
October 20	Kala	M.I.A.	
October 27	Kala	M.I.A.	
November 3	Oblivion with Bells	Underworld	
November 10	Hourglass	Dave Gahan	
November 17	Greatest Hits & Remixes	Paul Oakenfold	
November 24	Kala	M.I.A.	
December 1	Greatest Hits & Remixes	Paul Oakenfold	
December 8	Year Zero Remixed	Nine Inch Nails	
December 15	Year Zero Remixed	Nine Inch Nails	
December 22	Alive 2007	Daft Punk	
December 29	Alive 2007	Daft Punk	
