= CexCells =

Studio album by Blaqk Audio
- Released: August 14, 2007
- Recorded: January–March 2007
- Genre: Synth-pop; futurepop; EBM; dark wave
- Length: 50:55
- Label: Interscope
- Producer: Jade Puget

Blaqk Audio chronology
CexCells (2007)	Bright Black Heaven (2012)

Professional ratings
Review scores
Source	Rating
AllMusic	3.5/5 stars
The A.V. Club	C−
IndieLondon	2.5/5
The Phoenix	1.5/5 stars
PopMatters	5/10
SF Weekly	(mixed)
This Is Fake DIY	4/5
Virgin Media	0/5 stars

CexCells (pronounced "Sex Sells") is the debut studio album by the American electronic music duo Blaqk Audio. It was initially scheduled to be released on August 7, 2007, however, it was rescheduled and released a week further on August 14, 2007 through Interscope Records. It debuted at number 18 on the Billboard 200, selling more than 29,000 copies within its first week. It received mixed reviews from music critics. It spawned one single: "Stiff Kittens".

== Background and recording ==
Before Davey Havok and Jade Puget formed Blaqk Audio, the two began including more synthesized elements into AFI's songs, notably in the albums Sing the Sorrow and Decemberunderground. In the August 2006 issue of Guitar World, Puget revealed that "Love Like Winter" and "37mm" from Decemberunderground were initially intended to be a part of the side project. According to Havok, the concept of Blaqk Audio began at some point between 2001 and 2002, with "Snuff on Digital" being the first song written for the side project. Puget began experimenting with a multitude of industrial to ambient sounds, and was influenced by many different types of electronic music.

Havok and Puget entered the studio in January 2007 to begin recording CexCells. Puget began updating fans through their official Myspace page. Dan Under of The Dear & Departed and Nick 13 of Tiger Army, who has previously performed with AFI (see I Heard a Voice), provided background vocals for the album. The album's name and defunct release date was announced via Myspace and AbsolutePunk.

== Release and promotion ==
On August 3, 2007, Hot Topic stores across the United States began having listening parties to preview the entire album.

The album's fourth track, "Bitter For Sweet", was available for streaming via Myspace. A non-album track titled "If Only" was available for streaming on June 14 via Myspace as well. In January 2007, Puget posted lyrics to a song titled "Black-Ink Style" on his official blog, however, it was not included on the album and has not been released to date.

Instrumental segments of "Between Breaths (An XX Perspective)" and "The Love Letter" were used in the trailer for the 2008 remake of The Eye.

=== References to other bands ===
The song title "On a Friday" is an old band name belonging to Radiohead, while "Stiff Kittens" is an old band name belonging to Joy Division. Additionally, the duo recorded a cover of Blur's "Girls & Boys", exclusive to Hot Topic. Blaqk Audio also covered the song "No New Tale to Tell" by Love and Rockets.

Vocalist Davey Havok confirmed in an interview with Rhapsody that he and Puget settled on the album title CexCells before realizing that American electronic musician Cex's debut album was titled Cells.

== Track listing ==
All songs written by Davey Havok and Jade Puget.

1. "Stiff Kittens" – 3:47
2. "Between Breaths (an xx perspective)" – 4:28
3. "Snuff on Digital" – 5:03
4. "Bitter for Sweet" – 6:10
5. "Where Would You Like Them Left?" – 4:16
6. "The Fear of Being Found" – 4:44
7. "On a Friday" – 4:14
8. "The Love Letter" – 4:23
9. "Semiotic Love" – 3:32
10. "Cities of Night" – 3:47
11. "Again, Again and Again" – 3:26
12. "Wake Up, Open the Door and Escape to the Sea" – 3:05

=== Bonus tracks and B-sides ===
- "Black Electric" (iTunes exclusive) – 3:12
- "Girls & Boys" (Hot Topic exclusive; Blur cover) – 3:21
- "Mute" (Best Buy exclusive) – 3:45
- "The Ligature" (Myspace download exclusive) – 2:51
- "Black-Ink Style" (unreleased)
- "Nothing Good Happens Past 3" (unreleased)
- "If Only" (music video)

== Personnel ==
- Davey Havok – lead vocals
- Jade Puget – keyboards, synthesizer, backing vocals, programming, producer
- Chad Bamford – vocal engineer
- David Bascombe – mixing
- Matthew Cooke – photography
- Jennifer Goodridge – backing vocals (track 11)
- Joe LaPorta – mastering assistant
- Emily Lazar – mastering
- Morning Breath Inc. – art direction, design
- Nick 13 – backing vocals (tracks 5, 7)
- Jason Odell – band photography
- Matt Paul – mixing assistant
- Dan Under – backing vocals (tracks 5, 7)

== Charts ==
=== Weekly charts ===
Weekly chart performance for CexCells
Chart (2007)	Peak position
Australian Albums (ARIA)	86
Canadian Albums (Nielsen SoundScan)	55
UK Dance Albums (OCC)	29
US Billboard 200	18
US Indie Store Album Sales (Billboard)	7
US Top Alternative Albums (Billboard)	5
US Top Dance Albums (Billboard)	1
US Top Rock Albums (Billboard)	5

=== Year-end charts ===
Year-end chart performance for CexCells
Chart (2007)	Position
US Dance/Electronic Albums (Billboard)	13

== See also ==
- List of Billboard number-one electronic albums of 2007
