= Fulano =

Fulano may refer to:

- Fulano, a placeholder name in Portuguese and Spanish
- Fulano (band), a Chilean progressive rock/fusion jazz band formed in 1984
- Fulano de Tal, a Latin rock band, formed in 1995 in Miami
