= Bright Black Heaven =

Studio album by Blaqk Audio
- Released: September 11, 2012
- Recorded: 2009–2011
- Genre: Electronic
- Length: 48:16
- Label: Superball Music

Blaqk Audio chronology
CexCells (2007)	Bright Black Heaven (2012)	Material (2016)

Singles from Bright Black Heaven
- 1. "Faith Healer" Released: 14 August 2012

Professional ratings
Review scores
Source	Rating
AllMusic	3.5/5 stars
Alternative Press	4/5 stars
Revolver	3/5 stars

Bright Black Heaven is the second studio album by American electronica band Blaqk Audio, consisting of Davey Havok and Jade Puget of AFI, released on September 11, 2012, under Superball Music's imprint Big Death. The album title was first revealed in October 2009 in an interview with Jade on myYearbook, and the album itself had been completed as of December 2, 2011. The first single, "Faith Healer", was released on August 14.

== Background information ==
The album is a follow-up to 2007's CexCells, and it was ready before AFI's Crash Love (2009), but Puget said that he and Havok felt that "if all of a sudden we're doing two Blaqk Audio records in a row people will think AFI is not happening or something." They continued to write new songs for the album since they finished Crash Love, so Bright Black Heaven may have undergone some changes before its eventual release.

Since February 2010 the California-based radio station Live 105 had been playing a Blaqk Audio song entitled "Ill-Lit Ships". From July 22, 2010, BPM on Sirius XM Radio had been playing a Blaqk Audio song entitled "Bon Voyeurs". On October 24, Live105 premiered a song titled "Mouth to Mouth". Blaqk Audio performed at Subsonic Spookfest 2010 with eight songs, three of them being completely new: "This Is...", "Fade to White" and "Let's Be Honest". On November 25, Blaqk Audio posted a song titled "Down Here" on their SoundCloud page. On December 1, Live105 posted a song titled "Cold War".

On January 6, 2011, they performed a show at club Popscene in San Francisco, playing two new songs among others: "Say Red" and "Everybody's Friends". On July 23, a previously unheard song called "Bliss" was uploaded to their SoundCloud page, along with "Ill-Lit Ships" and "Mouth to Mouth". The song "Bliss" was also premiered on Live 105. A new Blaqk Audio song called "The Witness" is on the official soundtrack album of the 2011 movie Abduction, released on September 20. A song called "Afterdark" is on the official soundtrack album of the video game Batman: Arkham City. It was released on October 4, and the song itself was available for streaming on Alternative Press's website before that.

== Content, writing and production ==
Comparing to CexCells, the band has explored some different things, with more of a drum-and-bass influence in particular. Lyrically, it is largely about sexual themes, like their previous album.

Puget writes the entire songs from top to bottom, then sends them to Havok who writes the lyrics. They also produce the songs, and the mixing is done by Michael Patterson. They have recorded over 30 new songs.

== Track listing ==
No.	Title	Length
1.	"Cold War"	2:30
2.	"Fade to White"	3:30
3.	"Faith Healer"	4:45
4.	"Deconstructing Gods"	4:45
5.	"Everybody’s Friends"	3:56
6.	"Let’s Be Honest"	4:20
7.	"With Your Arms Around You"	4:27
8.	"Bliss"	4:09
9.	"Bon Voyeurs"	3:59
10.	"The Witness"	3:18
11.	"Say Red"	3:53
12.	"Ill-Lit Ships"	4:49
Total length:		48:21

=== Bonus tracks ===
- "Bite Your Tongue" (iTunes exclusive) – 3:37
- "Mouth to Mouth" (12" LP1 is white, LP2 is black) – 3:06
- "The Switch" (Hot Topic 12" vinyl exclusive) – 5:07
- "Down Here" (Faith Healer Remix EP on Beatport) – 4:02

== Personnel ==
- Davey Havok – lead vocals, primary lyricist, production
- Jade Puget – keyboards, synthesizer, programming, backing vocals, primary composer, production

== Charts ==
Chart (2012)	Peak position
US Billboard 200	43
US Billboard Dance/Electronic Albums	1
US Billboard Top Rock Albums	18
US Billboard Top Alternative Albums	12
