= Davey Havok =

American singer

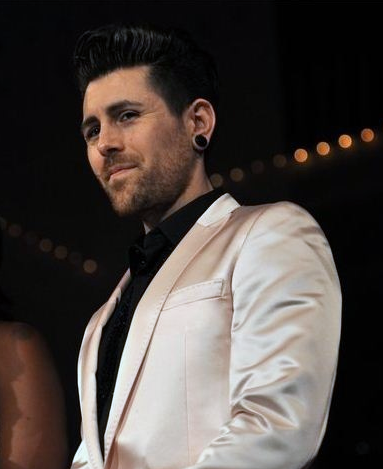
- Havok at the Mélange Fashion Show in 2011

Background information
- Born: David Paden Passaro; November 20, 1975 (age 50); Rochester, New York, U.S.
- Origin: Ukiah, California, U.S.
- Genres: Alternative rock; hardcore punk; gothic rock; horror punk; electronic rock; synth-pop; new wave
- Occupations: Singer; songwriter
- Years active: 1991–present
- Member of: AFI; Blaqk Audio; Dreamcar
- Formerly of: Son of Sam; XTRMST

David Paden Marchand (born David Paden Passaro, November 20, 1975), known professionally as Davey Havok, is an American singer who is the lead vocalist of the rock band AFI, the synth-pop band Blaqk Audio, the hardcore punk band XTRMST, and the new wave band Dreamcar. Among various other ventures, he performed lead vocals for Son of Sam's debut album and for fictional band My Purple Agony in the animated series Harvey Girls Forever!.

Havok is an advocate of the straight edge lifestyle and veganism.

== Early life ==
Havok was born David Paden Passaro, in Rochester, New York on November 20, 1975. He is of Italian ancestry.

When Havok was age 5, his father died, and he and his mother moved from Rochester to Sacramento, California to be closer to family. His mother remarried and Havok took on the surname of his stepfather (Marchand), and was enrolled in Catholic school through eighth grade. The family moved to Ukiah, California in the late 1980s, where he graduated from Ukiah High School in 1993.

Following high school, Havok attended University of California, Berkeley. Following his sophomore year, his career with AFI started, and Havok did not return to the university.

== Musical career ==
=== AFI ===
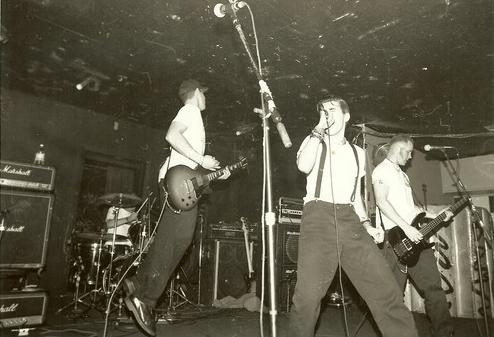
Havok (center) performing with AFI in 1995

Havok and his friends, Mark Stopholese and Vic Chalker, decided to start a band in high school, but they did not own or play any instruments. Stopholese suggested that Adam Carson might be able to fill the role of drummer because he owned a drum set. That band became AFI.

After high school, the band broke up when its members left for college. Havok attended UC Berkeley. There, he began writing lyrics that later appeared on AFI's first two albums.

After gaining some popularity in their absence, AFI played a show at the Phoenix Theater for several hundred fans. Following the positive reception, they decided to reunite and record an album. In 1995, Answer That and Stay Fashionable, the band's first album, was released on Wingnut Records and in 1996, Very Proud of Ya was released on Nitro Records. In 1997, the band released Shut Your Mouth and Open Your Eyes.

The next release was the A Fire Inside EP, which features covers of "The Hanging Garden" by the Cure and "Demonomania" by the Misfits. In 1999, the band released Black Sails in the Sunset, which was the first album to include the current line-up: Havok, Carson, Hunter Burgan and Jade Puget. In the fall of 1999, they released the All Hallows EP.

In 2000, they released The Art of Drowning to fair record sales. The group had toured with another band, Samhain, on their reunion tour; Havok later joined three members of Samhain and recorded an album under the name Son of Sam. In 2000, when Michale Graves had left the Misfits, Havok was approached by Roadrunner Records to be the lead singer of Misfits. However, Havok told an interviewer that he never would leave AFI as it was his own band.

AFI continued to tour for a few years and released a few EPs along the way. In 2003, Sing the Sorrow, the band's first major label release, was released, achieving platinum status in the U.S. and Canada and Gold in Australia. On June 6, 2006, Decemberunderground was released on Interscope Records, again achieving platinum status in the U.S. and Canada and Gold in Australia.

AFI's DVD I Heard a Voice – Live from Long Beach Arena was released on December 12, 2006, containing a live concert from Long Beach Arena from September 15, 2006. This DVD was released as a CD-version in November 2007. Decemberunderground achieved double platinum status in 2013, having sold more than 2 million copies worldwide. AFI's eighth studio album Crash Love was released on September 29, 2009, and Burials was released on October 22, 2013.

In late 2016, AFI released a series of teaser videos featuring song clips and backwards audio, eventually revealed to be promotion for AFI (also known as The Blood Album), released on January 20, 2017 via Concord Music Group. In 2022, AFI had the Bodies tour. For the 20 year anniversary of Sing the Sorrow, AFI performed the album in its entirety on March 11, 2023 at a sold-out concert in Inglewood, CA .

=== Son of Sam ===
In 2000, Havok formed Son of Sam alongside the 1999 reunion lineup of Samhain. This lineup released one album Songs from the Earth in 2001.

=== Blaqk Audio ===
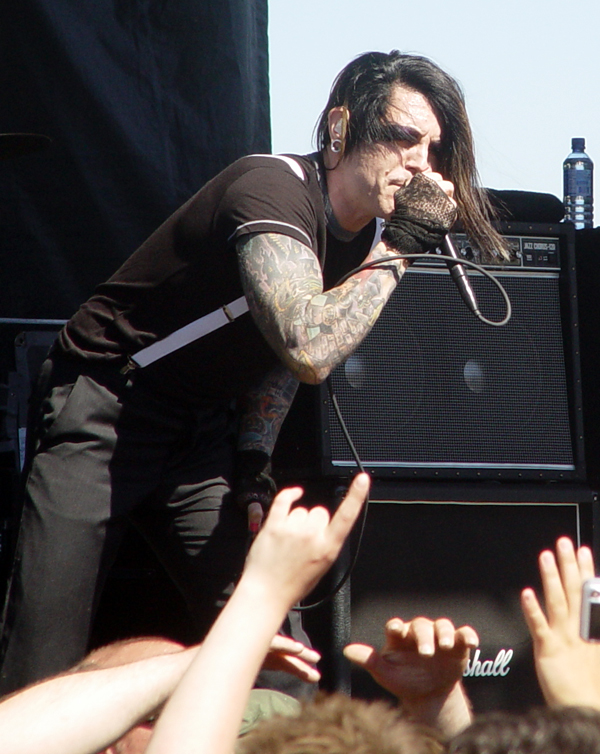
Havok performing in 2007

On August 14, 2007, Havok's electronic side project with AFI guitarist Jade Puget, Blaqk Audio, released their first album, titled CexCells. Blaqk Audio went on a two-month-long American/Canadian tour following the release. Blaqk Audio's Bright Black Heaven was released in September 2012, and a brief American tour followed. Material was released on April 15, 2016; Only Things We Love was released on March 15, 2019; Beneath the Black Palms was released August 21, 2020; Trop d'amour was released on September 16, 2022. On September 24, 2022, the Fonda had a one night only record release concert.

=== XTRMST ===
A number of cassette tapes appeared around some California record stores in early 2014, bearing the band name XTRMST. Listeners soon noted that the band's vocalist sounded like Havok, and rumors began spreading that he was the group's singer. On March 17, 2014, Jade Puget confirmed via Twitter that XTRMST was his and Havok's project. The band, a straight edge metalcore act, released its self-titled album via Dim Mak Records in late 2014.

=== Dreamcar ===
In 2016, it was revealed that Havok had formed Dreamcar with No Doubt members Tom Dumont, Tony Kanal and Adrian Young. The band performed at Coachella 2017 on April 15 and 22 and performed at Austin City Limits 2017 on October 7 and 14.

== Other ventures ==
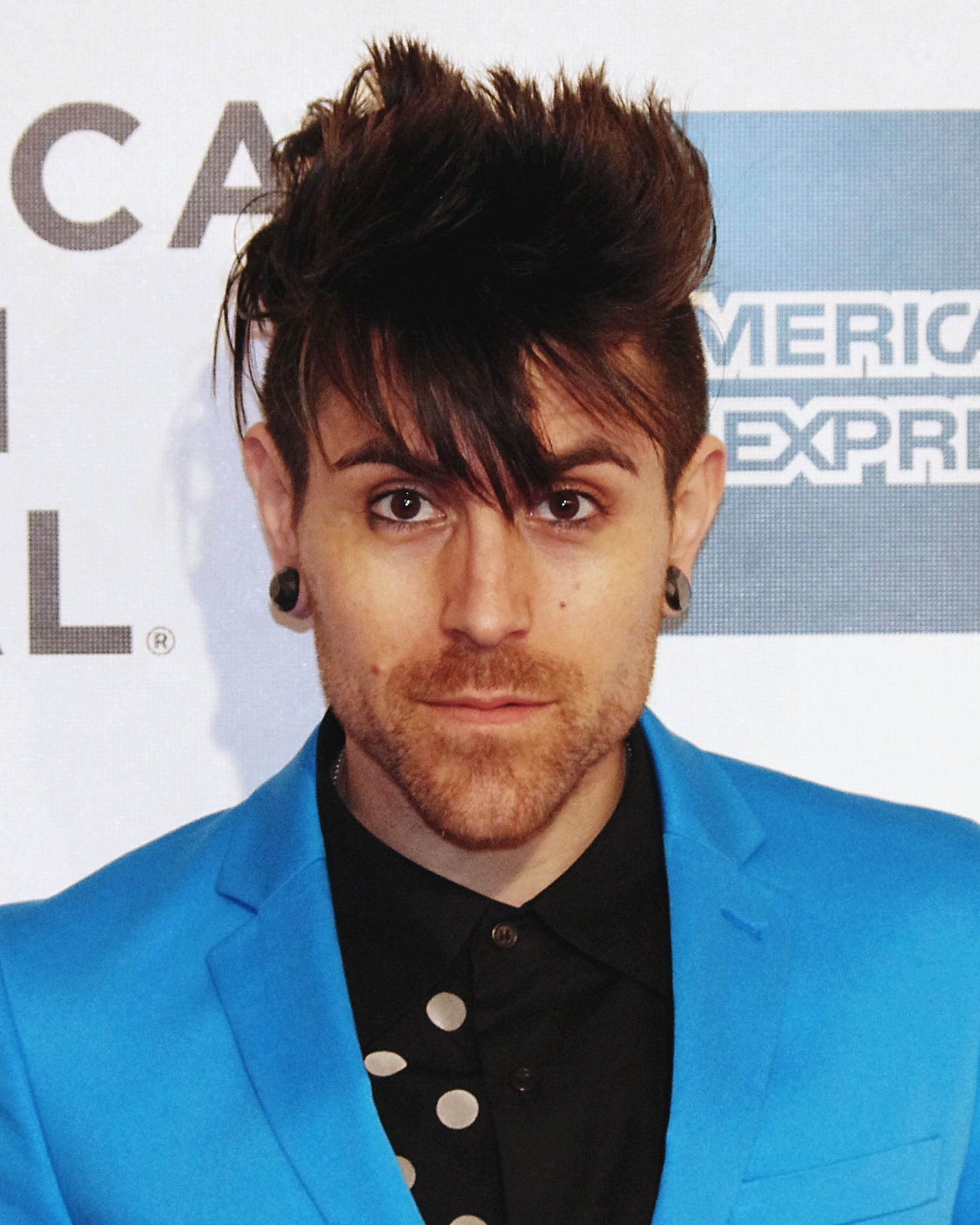
Havok in 2012

=== Fashion and modeling ===
Havok and Jeffree Star modeled for Tarina Tarantino's jewelry line, Tokyo Hardcore, in 2007. Havok was a presenter at the Mélange Fashion Show on August 6, 2011 in San Francisco. He was featured in the June 2012 issue of VAR Magazine and in Herring & Herring: Framed in 2014.

=== Acting ===
Havok played a supporting role in Sarah Jacobson's 1996 film Mary Jane's Not a Virgin Anymore. In 2009, Havok joined the cast of the "illustrated film" series Godkiller. Havok voices the antagonist role, a fallen god named Dragos. For March 2011, Havok joined the cast of Green Day's American Idiot on Broadway, playing the role of St. Jimmy. Havok is featured in at least one episode of Tim Armstrong's musical web series Tim Timebomb's RockNRoll Theatre. In addition to Armstrong's web show, Havok voiced Hay in John Roecker's 2006 stop motion animated film Live Freaky! Die Freaky! which tells the story of the Manson family. He had a small acting role in the 2012 film Knife Fight.

=== Books ===
On February 21, 2013, Havok announced that he had written Pop Kids and published it through Black Candy Publishing. The novel was released April 2013.

Havok released Love Fast Los Angeles in February 2018.

=== Clothing lines ===
Glitterboy was a short-lived fashion line created by Havok. It was partly inspired by the 1970s glam music scene, among other things. Clothing line Paden was released in 2007 and was available exclusively through Fred Segal clothing stores in California.

Havok's Zu Boutique was launched in August 2008. The line was vegan and featured T-shirts with a limited pressing of 100 shirts per design. A jewelry line was released in March 2009 in collaboration with PNUT Jewelry, the side project of Rusty Pistachio of punk band H_{2}O fame. The jewelry was also limited, with only 10 to 90 pieces of each design made. In August 2009, in collaboration with Macbeth Footwear, Zu released a line of limited-edition shoes. Plagued by legal trouble, Zu Boutique vanished in 2012. Havok continues to collaborate with PNUT Jewelry.

== Personal life ==
Havok is a vegan and was voted the winner of peta2's annual World's Sexiest Vegetarian contest in 2007. Havok appeared on the cover of Vegan Health and Fitness magazine for their March/April 2015 issue. He has said reading Diet for a New America by John Robbins caused him to adopt a vegan diet.

In more recent years, Havok had some of his tattoos "blacked out", saying "I'm constantly changing, and it's an attempt to cover up bad decisions with worse decisions. That's how I live life."

== Discography ==
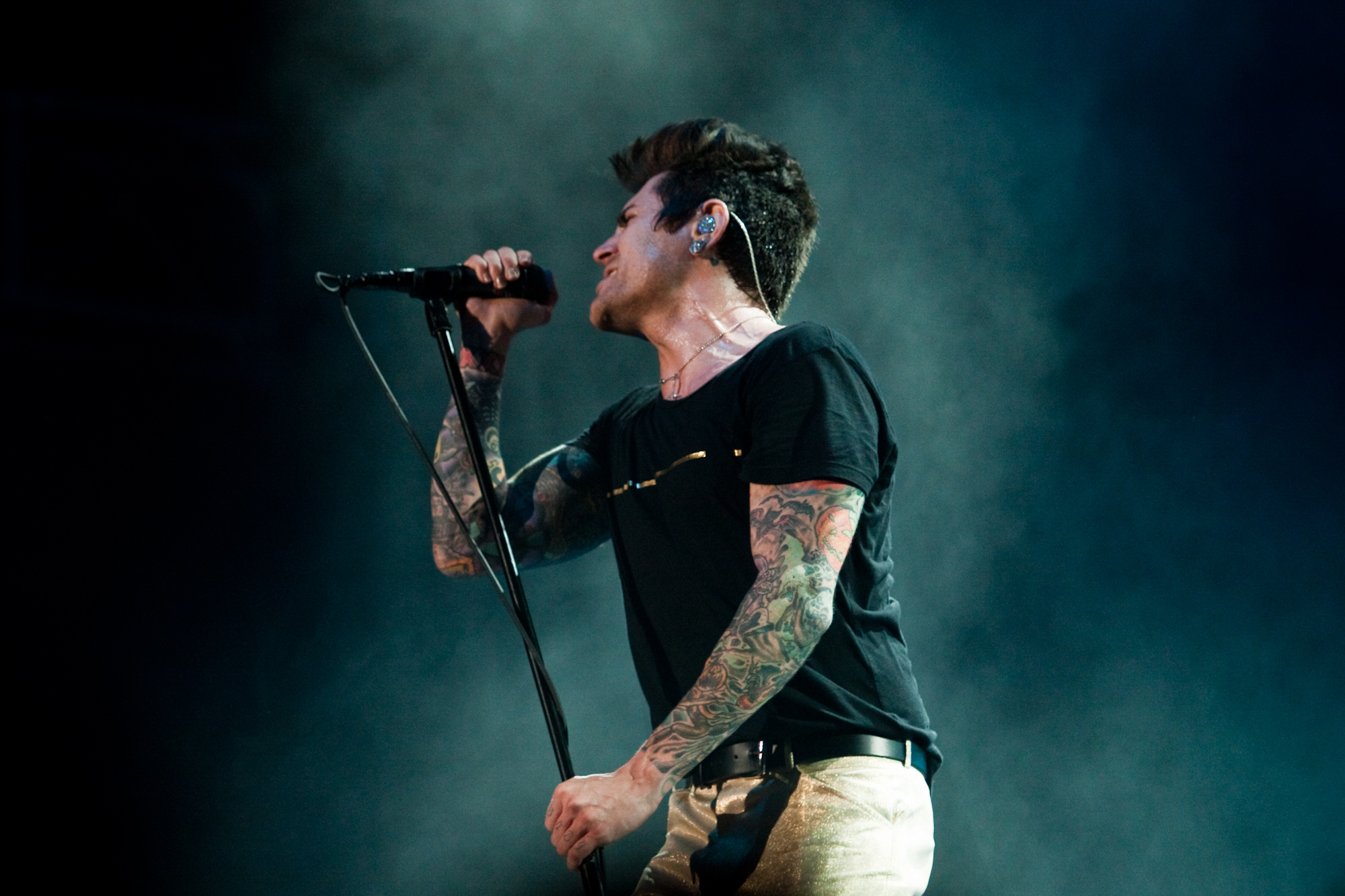
Davey Havok performing live in 2009

=== with AFI ===
- Answer That and Stay Fashionable (1995)
- Very Proud of Ya (1996)
- Shut Your Mouth and Open Your Eyes (1997)
- Black Sails in the Sunset (1999)
- The Art of Drowning (2000)
- Sing the Sorrow (2003)
- Decemberunderground (2006)
- Crash Love (2009)
- Burials (2013)
- AFI (2017)
- Bodies (2021)
- Silver Bleeds the Black Sun... (2025)

=== with Son of Sam ===
- Songs from the Earth (2001)

=== with Blaqk Audio ===
- CexCells (2007)
- Bright Black Heaven (2012)
- Material (2016)
- Only Things We Love (2019)
- Beneath the Black Palms (2020)
- Trop d'amour (2022)

=== with XTRMST ===
- XTRMST (2014)

=== with DREAMCAR ===
- Dreamcar (2017)
- Dream EP (2024)

=== Guest appearances ===
Havok has appeared as a guest vocalist on releases from various other bands, including:

- Additional vocals on Tiger Army's Tiger Army, Tiger Army II: Power of Moonlite, and Music from Regions Beyond.
- Backing vocals for The Offspring albums Ixnay on the Hombre and Americana
- Havok also appears on Bleeding Through's DVD Wolves Among Sheep
- Havok is seen on the Eighteen Visions's CD/DVD while recording their self-titled album
- Sang the Operation Ivy song "Knowledge" with Tim Armstrong and "Radio" with Rancid on the Give 'Em the Boot DVD
- Voice featured, along with other hardcore punk luminaries, in an answering machine recording on the All Bets Off album, "Girls About Songs"
- Havok is mentioned on the song "Mattersville" by NoFx

Song	Artist	Album	Refs.
"Astro-Zombies" (Note: Hidden track.)	Heckle	We're Not Laughing With You	
"Blue Strip"	Fury 66	For a Lack of a Better Word	
"Congratulations"	Jimmy Eat World	Surviving	
"Dead and Gone"	Heckle	Adequately Feigned Competence EP	
"December" (Note: Also songwriter.)	Seven Lions	The Throes of Winter	
"Empty Theatre, Pretty Picture"	Lane 8	Cross Pollination II	
"Feel Alive"	Fracas	A New Host of Torment	
"Float"	Souvenirs	Postures of Apology	
"Funeral Waves"	Dear Boy	Dear Boy EP	
"I Don't Wanna Behave"	Dance Hall Crashers	Lockjaw	
"Jekyl and Hyde"	The Nerve Agents	Days of the White Owl	
"Misconceptions of Hell"	Tim Timebomb	RocknRoll Theater HD (Note: YouTube webseries.)	
"Mother Nature"	My Purple Agony (Note: Fictional band from Harvey Girls Forever!.)	—	
"My World Is A Cookie"	My Purple Agony	—	
"Quick Death"	The Transplants	Transplants	
"Riptide"	Lane 8	Riptide - Single	
"S.K.Y."	The Witch Was Right	The Red Horse	
"Smile and Nod"	The Dear & Departed	Every Waking Moment	
"The Sky And I"	Scarlet Grey	Fancy Blood	

== Acting roles ==
Year	Title	Role	Notes
1996	Mary Jane's Not a Virgin Anymore	George	
2003	Clandestine	himself	
2006	Live Freaky! Die Freaky!	Hay	voice
2009	Godkiller: Walk Among Us	Dragos	voice
2009	New Brow: The Rise of Underground Art	himself	
2011	American Idiot	St. Jimmy	musical
2011	Tim Timebomb's RockNRoll Theater	Devil	
2012	Knife Fight	Jimmy McSorley	
2013	Big Joy: The Adventures of James Broughton	James Broughton's journals	voice
2015	Talking Marriage with Ryan Bailey	himself	special guest
2015	Darknet Delivery: A Silk Road Story	The Pop Philosopher	
2015	Dacryphilia	Pablo	voice
2017	Turn It Around: The Story of East Bay Punk	himself	documentary
2019	Harvey Street Kids	Victor Lavender	voice
2023	Free LSD	Davinatrix / The Promoter	
2023	Punk Rock Vegan Movie	himself	documentary
