= Only Things We Love =

Studio album by Blaqk Audio
- Released: March 15, 2019
- Recorded: 2018
- Genres: Futurepop; synth-pop
- Length: 42:02
- Label: Kobalt

Blaqk Audio chronology
| Material (2016) | Only Things We Love (2019) | Beneath the Black Palms (2020) |

Singles from Only Things We Love
- 1. "The Viles" Released: January 14, 2019

Only Things We Love is the fourth studio album by American electronica band Blaqk Audio, consisting of Davey Havok and Jade Puget of AFI. The album was released on March 15, 2019. Ahead of the album, the duo released "The Viles".

== Background ==
Havok said during an interview with Matt Pinfield that the band's next album would be out in spring of 2019 and that 69 songs were written to choose from. In January 2019, Davey Havok visited the KITS (ALT 105.3) studios to showcase the single "The Viles". While at the studio, Havok also confirmed the album's title, Only Things We Love.

In an interview with Sam Moore of NME, Havok revealed the album would be released on March 15, 2019.

== Reception ==
Professional ratings
Aggregate scores
| Source | Rating |
|---|---|
| Album of the Year | 72/100 |
| Metacritic | 70/100 |
Review scores
| Source | Rating |
| AllMusic | 4/5 stars |
| Kerrang! | 3/5 stars |
| PopMatters | 6/10 stars |
| Sputnikmusic | 3.8/5 stars |

AllMusic critic Neil Z. Yeung wrote, "Less precious and wide-eyed than on 2016's Material, Havok and Puget sharpened their attack and tightened their delivery for [Only Things We Love], resulting in an aggressive yet alluring peak in their catalog... a hook-heavy romp for dance-loving misfits." Yeung drew comparisons to bands including Ultravox, OMD, Erasure and New Order.

== Track listing ==
| No. | Title | Length |
|---|---|---|
| 1. | "Infinite Skin" | 3:17 |
| 2. | "The Viles" | 3:35 |
| 3. | "Unstained" | 3:31 |
| 4. | "Muscle and Matter" | 4:03 |
| 5. | "Caroline in the Clip" | 3:54 |
| 6. | "Maker" | 3:20 |
| 7. | "Summer's Out of Sight" | 3:18 |
| 8. | "OK, Alex" | 2:45 |
| 9. | "Enemies Forever" | 3:13 |
| 10. | "Dark Arcades" | 4:02 |
| 11. | "Dark Times at the Berlin Wall" | 3:08 |
| 12. | "Matrimony and Dust" | 4:17 |
| Total length: | | 42:02 |

== Personnel ==
- Davey Havok – Lyrics and Vocals
- Jade Puget – Production, Recording and Engineering, All Music, Programming, Keyboards, Mixing and Mastering on "Dark Times at the Berlin Wall" and "OK, Alex"
- Eric Stenman – Mixing
- Mike Bell at Darkart Mastering – Mastering

== Charts ==
| Chart (2019) | Peak position |
|---|---|
| US Top Dance Albums (Billboard) | 12 |
