= Jade Puget =

American musician and producer (born 1973)

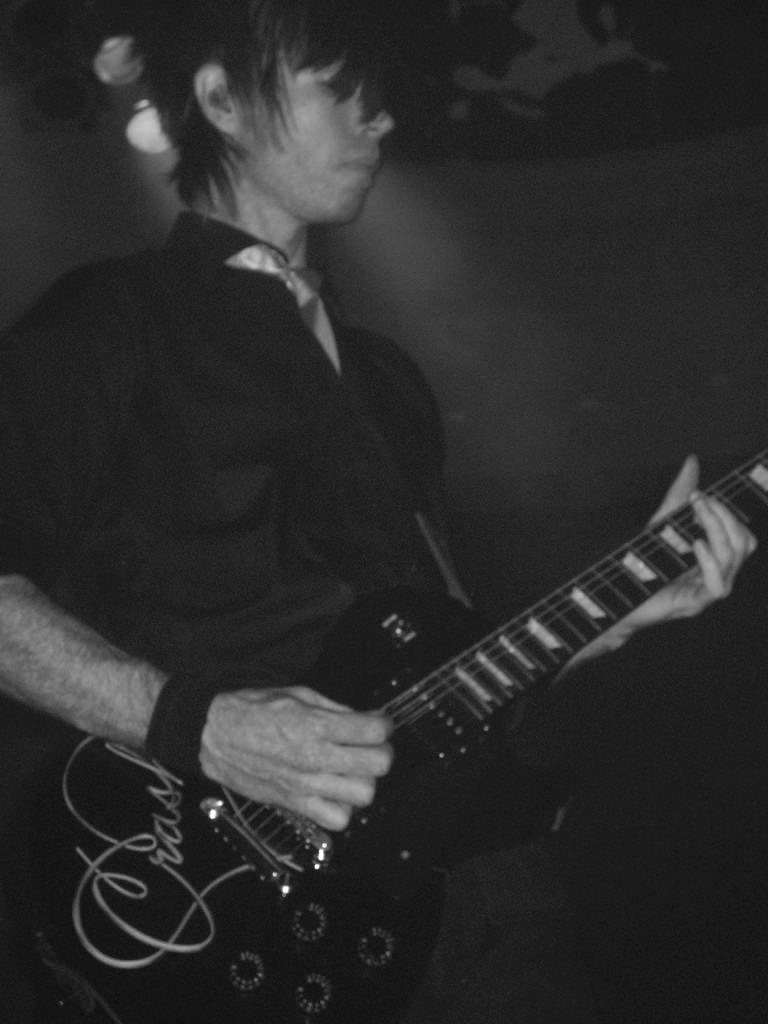
- Jade Puget performing with AFI in Columbus, Ohio in October 2009

Background information
- Born: Jade Errol Puget; November 28, 1973 (age 52); Santa Rosa, California, U.S.
- Origin: Ukiah, California
- Genres: Alternative rock; punk rock; post-hardcore; horror punk; hardcore punk; electronica
- Occupations: Musician; producer
- Instruments: Guitar; keyboards; synthesizer; piano
- Years active: 1998–present
- Member of: AFI; Blaqk Audio
- Formerly of: Influence 13; Loose Change; Redemption 87; XTRMST

Jade Errol Puget (born November 28, 1973) is an American musician and producer, best known as the guitarist for the rock band AFI (joined in 1998), the guitarist/writer for the straight edge hardcore band XTRMST, and the keyboardist/synthesizer operator for the electronic duo Blaqk Audio.

== Career ==
Before joining AFI on November 2, 1998, Jade Puget played in various bands, including Loose Change and Redemption 87. His first album with AFI was 1999's Black Sails in the Sunset.

The first song he wrote for the band was "Malleus Maleficarum". Puget's addition to the band introduced fans to a more melodically acute and dynamic sound that was vastly different from earlier material.

AFI next released the All Hallow's E.P. in October 1999, which featured various elements of horror punk and a sound disparate from much of the band's earlier material. The EP's single was "Totalimmortal". The song received some airplay on television programs such as MTV2, and was even covered by The Offspring for use in the film Me, Myself, and Irene.

The year 2000 saw the release of The Art of Drowning. The album sold 88,000 copies by March 2002 and the single, "The Days of the Phoenix", peaked at number 152 on the UK Singles Chart.

After The Art of Drowning, AFI were signed by the major label DreamWorks Records in 2002. Sing the Sorrow, AFI's major label debut, was released in March 2003. The album yielded three singles that found success on the U.S. Alternative Songs chart: "Girl's Not Grey" (No. 7), "The Leaving Song Pt. II" (No. 16), and "Silver and Cold" (No. 7). The album was certified platinum by the RIAA in 2006.

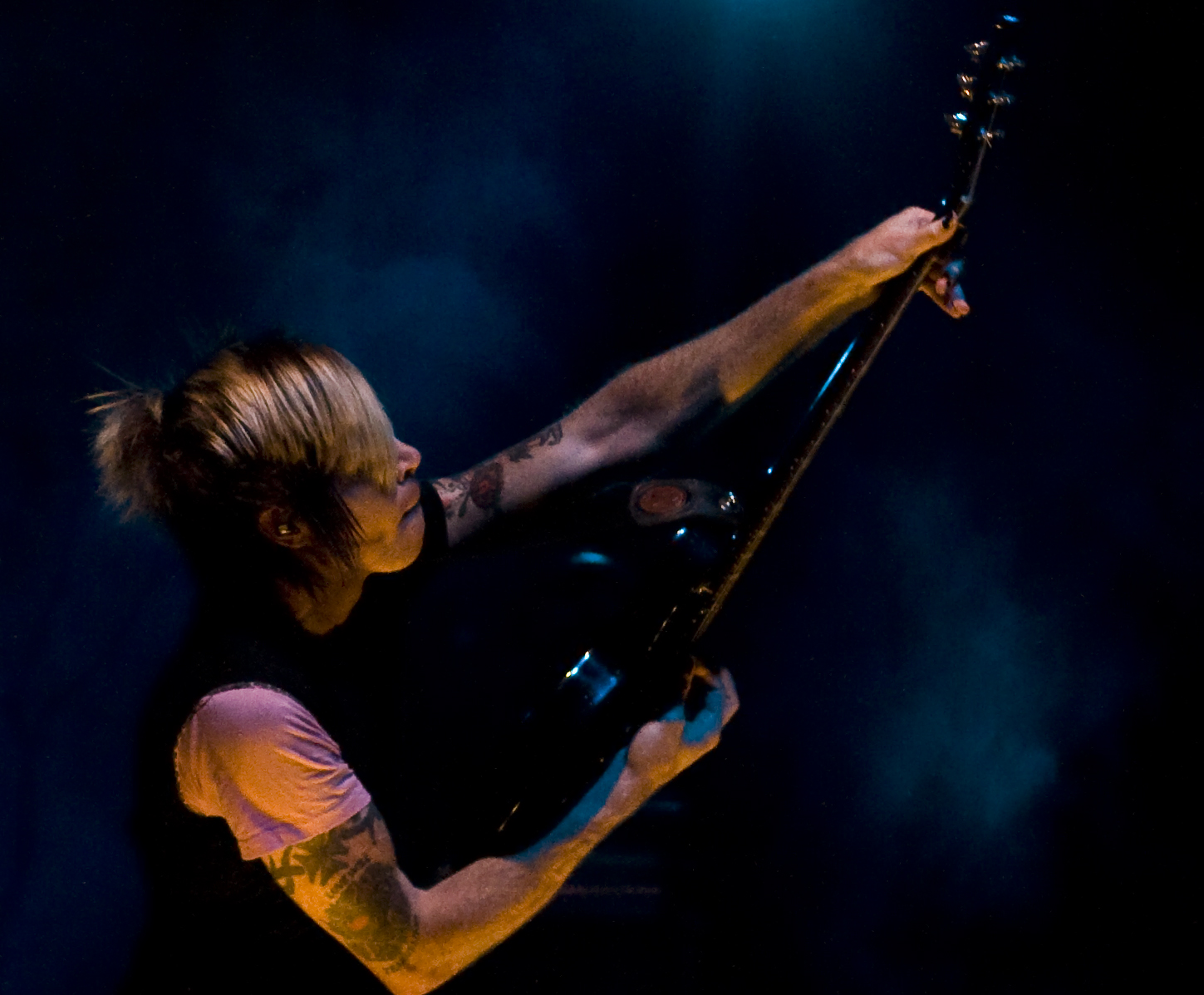
Puget performing in 2007

Decemberunderground, the follow-up to Sing the Sorrow, was released in June 2006. It debuted at No. 1 on the Billboard 200, selling over 182,000 copies in its first week. The single, "Miss Murder," peaked at No. 1 on the Alternative Songs chart for five weeks and also reached No. 24 on the Billboard Hot 100. The album produced the singles "Love Like Winter" (No. 4) and "The Missing Frame" (No. 17). Decemberunderground sold over 993,000 copies by 2009.

In 2007, Puget and AFI bandmate Davey Havok released the album CexCells as the electronic duo Blaqk Audio. The album reached No. 18 on the Billboard 200 and featured the single "Stiff Kittens", which peaked at No. 20 on the Alternative Songs chart.

AFI's eighth studio album, Crash Love, was released in September 2009 and debuted at No. 12 on the Billboard 200. The album produced the two singles: "Medicate", and "Beautiful Thieves", which charted at No. 7 and No. 23 on the Alternative Songs Chart, respectively. In the time off after the Crash Love tour, Puget and Havok returned to Blaqk Audio, releasing their second album, Bright Black Heaven, made available September 11, 2012.

On October 22, 2013, AFI's ninth studio album, Burials, was released. In the months prior to the release, two songs were released as singles. The first, I Hope You Suffer, was released July 22. The second single, 17 Crimes, was released August 6. The album received mixed reviews, with the most notable one being from Mike Powell of Rolling Stone Magazine, giving the album 2/5 stars, and commenting that, "'17 Crimes' and 'Greater Than 84' survive with the band's flair for camp still intact. Others drown in pools of eyeliner. Flamboyant, serious, plagued by problems he never gets too specific about, Davey Havok invents a role part Morrissey, part Bret Michaels – hair-metal pinup for the Hot Topic era."

In February 2014, numerous cassette tapes were distributed from record shops in Southern California, titled "XTRMST" and described as "Straight edge hardcore". In the following weeks, numerous sources leaked rumors that XTRMST was a side project of Puget and Davey Havok. Shortly after, Puget confirmed on his Twitter account that XTRMST was indeed a product of him and Havok.

On October 2, 2014, it was announced the XTRMST would release a full-length LP, available on November 18. The album was made available for purchase either digitally or on vinyl record. Puget has stated that he and Havok had no intent on releasing a full-length record, but the overwhelming positive reaction motivated them to move forward with the project.

== Remixing and production ==
Puget remixed Marilyn Manson's single "Heart-Shaped Glasses (When the Heart Guides the Hand)," released as an international bonus track from the 2007 album Eat Me, Drink Me, and The Cure's song "Freakshow" from their 13th album 4:13 Dream. The remix appears on The Cure's 2008 EP Hypnagogic States. He remixed Tiger Army's "Where the Moss Slowly Grows" off the band's album Music From Regions Beyond. He did some additional production on The Dear & Departed's debut album Something Quite Peculiar. Additionally, he remixed Tokio Hotel's UK single "Ready, Set, Go!" from their first English album, Scream.

Puget did some production work for the band Scarlet Grey on their song "Fancy Blood" on the album of the same name. His remix of The Static Age's song "Vertigo" (called "Airplanes") appeared as a bonus track on the band's album "Neon Nights Electric Lives. His remix of Escape the Fate's song Issues, for which he used the name Wolves at the Gate, appears on their Issues Remixes EP. In 2012 he remixed Swedish group Lowe's song "Mirage" from the band's latest album Evolver.

== Personal life ==
Puget has a half-sister named Alisha, a half-brother named Gibson, and a younger brother named Smith, who is also AFI's tour manager. Gibson appears in the poem in the interlude of "...But Home Is Nowhere" full-length album version Sing the Sorrow.

With straight As throughout his K-12 career, Puget dropped out of school at the age of 17 and continued his education at UC Berkeley, where he received a bachelor's degree in sociology in 1996. After graduating from college, Puget joined AFI.

Puget has various tattoos, including an "18" (which was originally a "13"), a cat jumping through a 9 (a tattoo he shares with Nick 13 of Tiger Army and Davey Havok), and the word "committed" arched across his stomach. On his arms, he has the words "Boys Don't Cry" (a homage to The Cure) and the words "Love Will Tear Us Apart" (a Joy Division tribute). He also has the word "Paprika", the nickname of his wife, on his arm. Puget is vegetarian and straight edge.

In July 2011, Puget and his girlfriend of six years, Marissa Festa became engaged to be married, and were married on September 22, 2012, in Malibu, California. Their son was born on February 15, 2023.

== Discography ==
=== With AFI ===
- Black Sails in the Sunset (1999)
- All Hallow's E.P. (1999)
- The Art of Drowning (2000)
- Sing the Sorrow (2003)
- Decemberunderground (2006)
- Crash Love (2009)
- Burials (2013)
- AFI (2017)
- Bodies (2021)
- Silver Bleeds the Black Sun... (2025)

=== With Blaqk Audio ===
- CexCells (2007)
- Bright Black Heaven (2012)
- Material (2016)
- Only Things We Love (2019)
- Beneath the Black Palms (2020)
- Trop d'amour (2022)

=== With XTRMST ===
- XTRMST (2014)

=== With Twinsign ===
- Twinsign EP (2021)
- Scry (2023)

=== Solo ===
- Red Fire Pale (2024)
- Hello Morning Void (2024)
- Suffer And Learn (2023)
