= Material (Blaqk Audio album) =

Studio album by Blaqk Audio
- Released: April 15, 2016
- Recorded: 2015
- Genre: Electronic; new wave
- Length: 43:18
- Label: Blaqknoise/Kobalt Records

Blaqk Audio chronology
Bright Black Heaven (2012)	Material (2016)	Only Things We Love (2019)

Singles from Material
- 1. "Anointed" Released: 19 February 2016; 2. "First to Love" Released: 28 July 2016

Material is the third studio album by American electronica band Blaqk Audio, consisting of Davey Havok and Jade Puget of AFI. it was released on April 15, 2016 under Blaqknoise/Kobalt Records. The first single from the album, "Anointed", was released on January 26 for streaming through SoundCloud and through digital retailers on February 19.

== Background ==
Material for the album was written throughout 2014 and was recorded in 2015. Material was originally planned for a release in 2015. Havok has said that the album is lyrically "darker than our records of the past." Music sequencer Ableton Live was used in production of the album.

== Critical reception ==
Professional ratings
Review scores
Source	Rating
AllMusic	4/5 stars in a 0–5 star scale
Rock Sound	7/10
Rolling Stone Australia	3/5 stars in a 0–5 star scale

The album received generally positive reviews from mainstream critics. Neil Yeung, from AllMusic, gave a positive review: "Since their debut in 2007, Blaqk Audio – the electronic outlet for AFI's Davey Havok and Jade Puget – have toyed with the dance sounds and dark tones of new wave". Tomas Doyle, from Rock Sound, also gave a positive review, stating that "the skill and ease of songwriting the duo bring to the table is a delight".

Writing for Rolling Stone, Sally McMullen gave the album a mixed-to-positive review, saying,

The record embodies a seamless fluidity as energetic electro masks some of the more forlorn lyrics on the likes of "I'm a Mess" and "You Will Hate Me". There's a hint of familiarity as Havok's clean vocals soar on "First to Love" and the title track, but the absence of his signature scratchy growl can be unnerving.

== Track listing ==
No.	Title	Length
1.	"Waiting to Be Told"	3:46
2.	"First to Love"	3:43
3.	"Ceremonial (Burst into Stars)"	4:29
4.	"Anointed"	4:27
5.	"To Be Alone"	3:22
6.	"Black at the Center"	3:45
7.	"Curious Friends"	4:53
8.	"Graphic Violence"	4:14
9.	"I'm a Mess"	3:39
10.	"Material"	3:13
11.	"You Will Hate Me"	3:48
Total length:		43:18

== Personnel ==
- Davey Havok – lead vocals, primary lyricist, production
- Jade Puget – keyboards, synthesizer, programming, backing vocals, primary composer, production

== Charts ==
Chart (2016)	Peak position
US Billboard Dance/Electronic Albums	1
US Billboard Top Rock Albums	31
US Billboard Top Alternative Albums	21
