= Beneath the Black Palms =

Studio album by Blaqk Audio
- Released: August 21, 2020
- Recorded: 2019–2020
- Genre: Electropop; futurepop; synth-pop
- Length: 39:26
- Label: BMG

Blaqk Audio chronology
Only Things We Love (2019)	Beneath the Black Palms (2020)	Trop d’amour (2022)

Singles from Beneath the Black Palms
- 1. "Consort" Released: July 28, 2020; 2. "Hiss" Released: August 20, 2020

Alternative cover
- The cover for the EP version for the first 5 songs of the album.

Beneath the Black Palms is the fifth studio album by American electronica band Blaqk Audio, consisting of Davey Havok and Jade Puget of AFI. The album was released on August 21, 2020. Ahead of the album, the duo released "Consort".

== Background ==
Beneath the Black Palms, released just a year-and-a-half after their fourth album, Only Things We Love, has been described by Havok as "a bird sister" to the previous album. Havok said the album is about "is an affirmation, exaltation, and momentary illumination of rich, arcane shadows fortified by blinding and rapturous light says".

== Release and promotion ==
On July 24, 2020, Blaqk Audio released a cryptic teaser video on their Instagram page. This was revealed on July 28 to be promotion for the band's fifth album, Beneath the Black Palms, which was released on August 21, 2020. The same day, the band surprise-released a digital EP consisting of the album's first 5 songs, titled Beneath the Black Palms (Side A), which was followed shortly by a visualizer video for the song "Hiss".

== Track listing ==
No.	Title	Length
1.	"Consort"	4:28
2.	"Zipper Don't Work"	3:05
3.	"1948"	4:04
4.	"A Distant Light"	3:42
5.	"Hiss"	2:06
6.	"Burnt Babies Fear the Fire"	3:07
7.	"Fish Bite"	3:24
8.	"Bird Sister"	2:59
9.	"I'm Coming Over"	3:37
10.	"Tired Eyes"	3:41
11.	"It's Not Going Well"	4:33
Total length:		39:26

== Personnel ==
- Davey Havok – lead vocals, lyricist
- Jade Puget – keyboard, synthesizer, backing vocals, composer
