= XTRMST (album) =

Studio album by XTRMST
- Released: November 18, 2014
- Recorded: 2014
- Genre: Hardcore punk
- Length: 31:32
- Label: Dim Mak
- Producer: Jade Puget

Singles from XTRMST
- 1. "Conformist" Released: October 3, 2014; 2. "Dirty Nails" Released: October 21, 2014; 3. "Exterminate" Released: November 4, 2014

Professional ratings
Review scores
Source	Rating
Punknews.org	4/5 stars

XTRMST is the debut and only studio album by American hardcore punk band XTRMST. It was released on November 18, 2014, through Dim Mak Records, the label founded by Steve Aoki. Three singles were released from the album; "Conformist" was the lead single, followed by "Exterminate" and "Dirty Nails". A music video was produced for "Conformist".

== Track listing ==
No.	Title	Length
1.	"Words For The Unwanted"	2:03
2.	"Conformist"	2:36
3.	"Social Deathplay"	1:42
4.	"Merciless"	2:11
5.	"Exterminate"	1:57
6.	"Sharper"	2:11
7.	"Extremist"	2:30
8.	"The Breed"	2:34
9.	"Humanity"	2:17
10.	"The Way"	1:53
11.	"Swallow Your God"	1:52
12.	"Dirty Nails"	3:03
13.	"Juliets"	2:52
14.	"Coward, Bow Your Head"	1:50
Total length:		31:32
