= John Roecker =

American film director

- Born: January 30, 1966 (age 60); Ohio, United States
- Occupation: Independent filmmaker
- Spouse: Divorced
- Children: None

John Roecker (born January 30, 1966) is an independent filmmaker who is associated with the punk subculture. He currently resides in Los Angeles, California. Roecker is probably best known for Live Freaky! Die Freaky!, a stop motion animated comedy based on the true crime book Helter Skelter.

From 1996 to 1999, Roecker and Exene Cervenka co-owned Los Angeles store "You've Got Bad Taste." The store specialized in kitsch and various "off-color" novelties, such as paintings by serial killer and rapist John Wayne Gacy and a Federal Bureau of Investigation (FBI) wanted poster of bank robber Patty Hearst . He recently released an album with collaborator Dylan Melody titled Rocker|Melody on Frontier Records. A music video was created for every track on the album.

Next, Roecker and Melody are collaborating on a musical about Charles Manson.

== Works ==
- "The Fear Morty's Theme" Bootleg: From the Lost Vault, Vol. 1, Esham. Music video. Director. (2000)
- Disease is Punishment, The Network. Concert video. Director. (2004)
- Live Freaky! Die Freaky!. Stop motion feature film. Animator, director, and screenwriter. (2006)
- Everything You Wanted to Know About Gay Porn Stars* (*But Were Too Afraid to Ask). Seven-part documentary TV series based on interviews with male pornography stars. Director. (2008)
- Svengali!, (webseries). Actor, director, and screenwriter. (2010)
- They're All Out Without You, short film using footage cut from Heart Like a Hand Grenade (see above in 2009). Director and screenwriter. (2011)
- Tim Timebomb's Rock'n'Roll Theatre, (webseries). Co-written with Tim Armstrong. (2012)
- Heart Like a Hand Grenade. Documentary of Green Day's production of the 2004 album American Idiot. Recorded from 2003 to 2005. Director. (2015)
