= Elsten Torres =

American singer-songwriter

- Born: February 10, 1965 (age 61)
- Origin: Havana, Cuba
- Genres: Rock, pop
- Occupations: Singer, songwriter
- Instrument: Guitar
- Years active: 1993–present
- Website: elsten.info instagram.com/elstentorres youtube.com/@elstentorresmusic

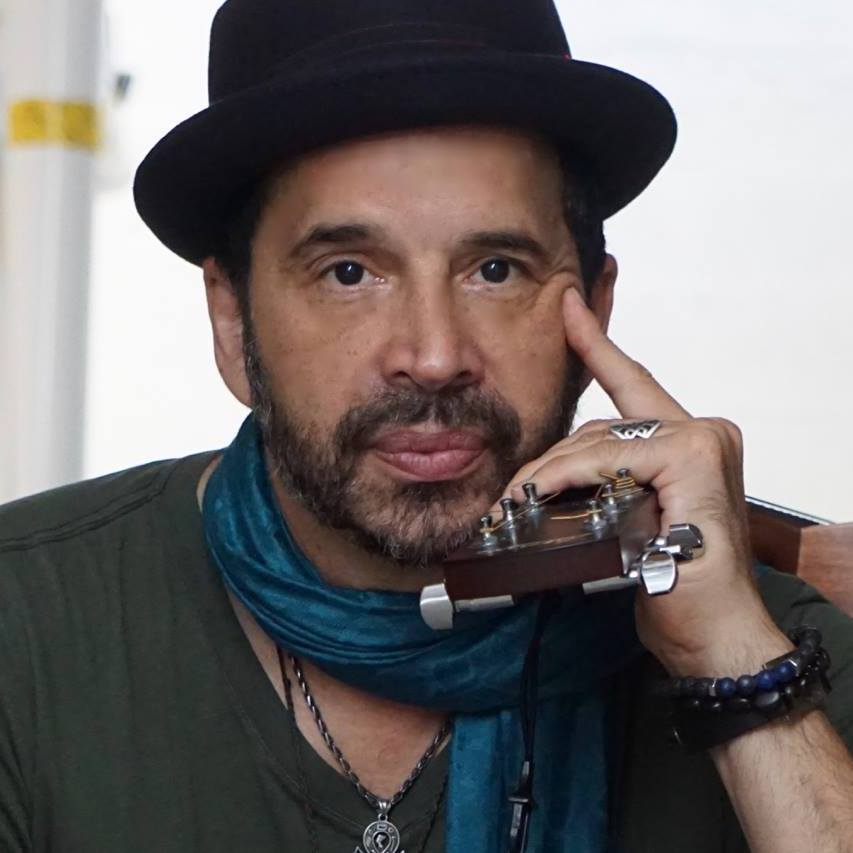
Elsten Torres, official head shot

== Elsten Torres ==
Elsten Torres (born Listoriel Leyva Torres, 1965) is a Cuban-American singer-songwriter, musician, and producer. He is known for his contributions to Latin rock and alternative music, both as a solo artist and as the frontman of the band Fulano.

=== Early life ===
Torres was born in Havana, Cuba, in 1965 to parents from Puerto Padre, Las Tunas, in the former province of Oriente. In 1966, at the age of 18 months, he emigrated to the United States with his mother, Elsa Torres, and older brother, Dorian, through the Freedom Flights program. His father, detained by the Cuban government for political dissent, remained in Cuba at the time.

The family settled in the Washington Heights neighborhood of Manhattan, New York City. Torres was raised by his mother, who worked in cosmetology after obtaining a professional license. Music played a central role in his upbringing, influenced in part by his uncle Listoriel Torres, a Cuban singer-songwriter who had also relocated to the United States.

=== Musical career ===
Torres began playing guitar at the age of 11 and formed his first band by age 15. He received private instruction in guitar, voice, and songwriting and later studied audio engineering and music production. At 22, he signed a recording contract with an independent Mexican label as a member of the rock band Rebelde Sin Causa, touring in Mexico before returning to New York.

In 1992, Torres moved to Miami to pursue opportunities in the Latin music industry. In 1994, he signed with Radio Vox, an independent label founded by producers Rodolfo Castillo and Gustavo Menendez. His early solo work included the single “Revolución,” a protest song that gained traction in Cuban-American communities.

Following this success, Torres formed the Latin alternative/rock band Fulano, which later signed with BMG/RCA. Fulano released two studio albums and toured throughout the United States and Latin America. Around the same time, Torres signed a publishing agreement with Warner Chappell Music.

After Fulano disbanded, Torres transitioned to writing for other artists. His compositions have charted on Billboard, including the No. 1 single “Todo El Año,” which remained at the top of the Latin charts for five consecutive weeks.

=== Solo Work and Recognition ===
Torres resumed performing as a solo artist and has released 14 full-length albums. He has received two Grammy Award nominations and two BMI songwriting awards. His musical style blends elements of rock, pop, and traditional Latin music.

In addition to his artistic work, Torres has participated in music advocacy and education programs, including Songfest. He has served on the board of the Recording Academy's Florida Chapter.

=== Recent Projects ===
As of 2025, Torres is preparing to release an album titled ViceVersa, which incorporates Cuban musical influences with reggae and rock. He is also developing a comic book about a young Cuban musician with supernatural abilities and writing a musical, Mima, based on his mother's emigration story.

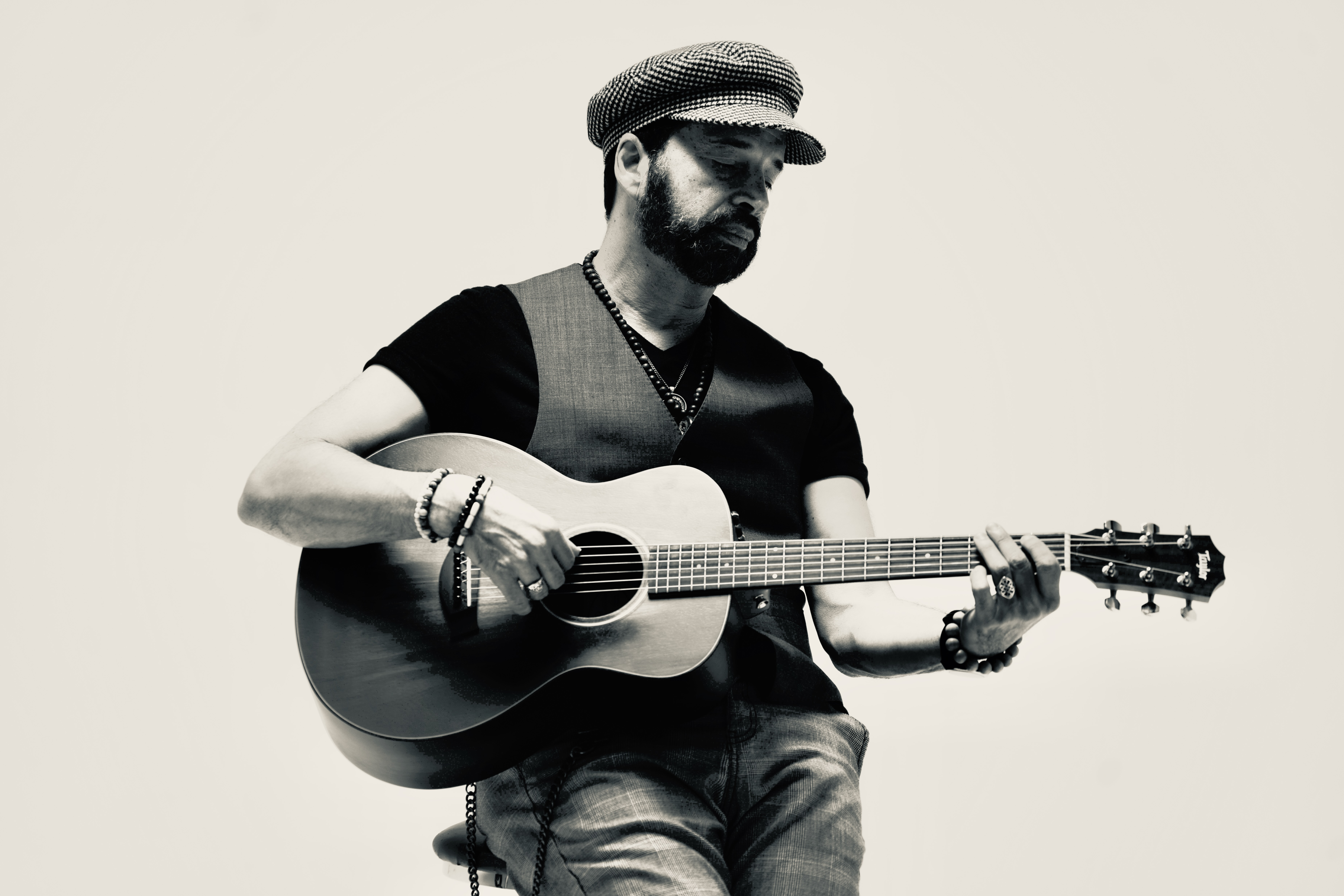
Elsten Torres, "Noir Guitar"

== Mistaken Identity and Rebelde Sin Causa ==
His first serious band was called Mistaken Identity, followed by his first Latin rock band, Rebelde Sin Causa. Torres recorded his first professional album, Ataque, with his music partner, Leonardo "Jason X" Perez, on Mexican rock label Discos Gas.

== "Fulano De Tal" (Fulano) Band ==
In Miami, Torres first recorded with the independent label Radio Vox, under the artistic name of Fulano de Tal.

His first single was the Cuban protest anthem "Revolucion". With its success he put the band together that would become Fulano De Tal.

The original members were drummer Brendan Buckley, guitarist Julian Adam Zimmon, and bassist Leo Nobre. Nobre left the band right before they were to record their major label debut, Normal, through BMG/RCA. He was replaced by bassist John M. Falcone. Fulano de Tal released two full-length albums, Normal (BMG/RCA), and Etc. (Radio Vox/DLN). The band officially broke up in 2001, after two of its members Zimmon and Buckley joined Shakira's band.

After the breakup of the band, Torres has continued as a solo artist, he has also had success writing for and with other artists such as Ricky Martin, Luis Fonsi, Obie Bermúdez, Alejandra Guzmán, Julio Iglesias Jr. Aleks Syntek, Ednita Nazario, Oscar de Leon, David Bisbal, Elvis Costello, Marshall Crenshaw, John Rich (Big & Rich) and several others.

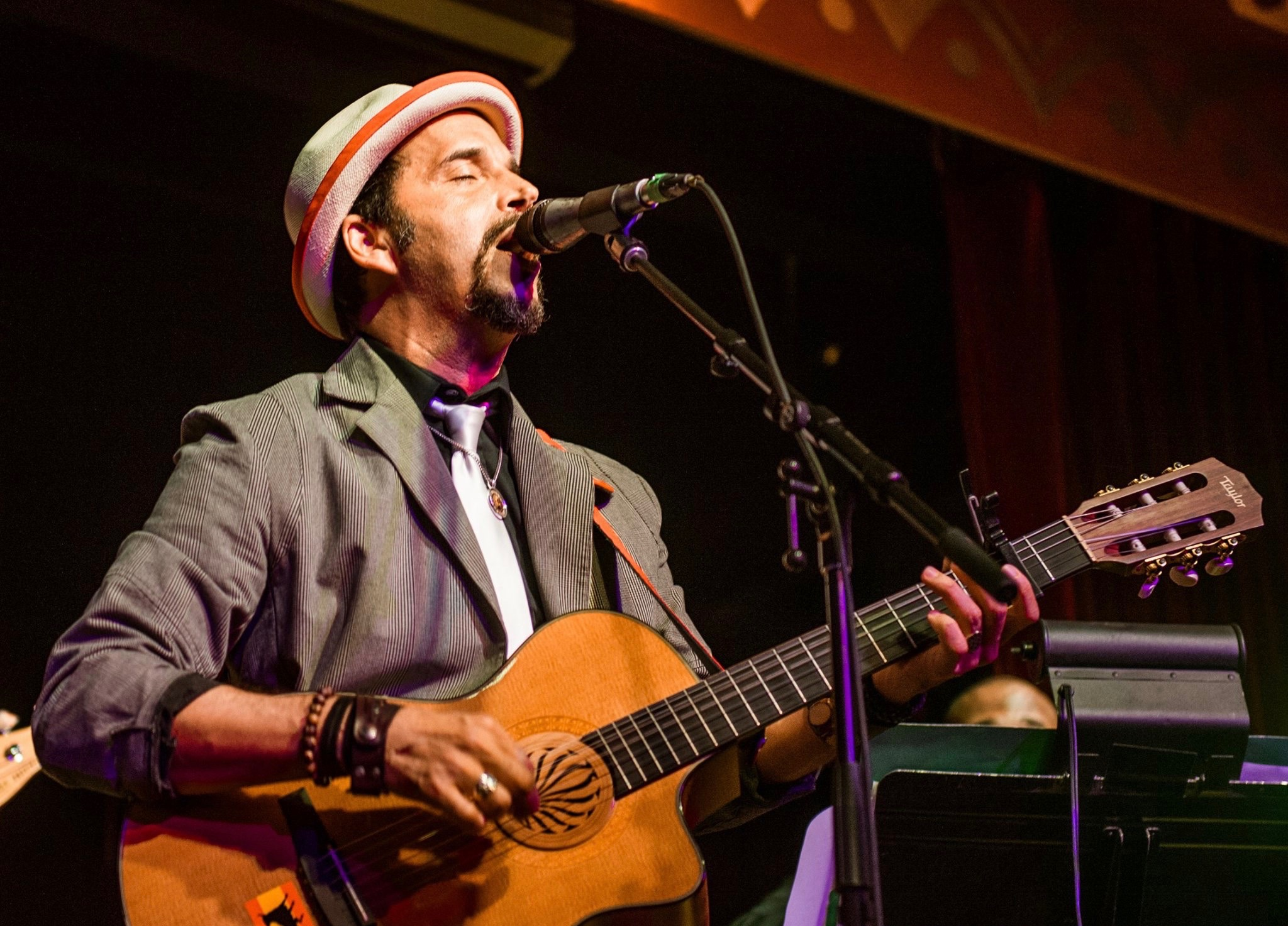
Lula Lounge, Toronto, Ontario, 2019

== Discography ==
Elsten Torres' discography is as follows:

Albums and singles

- Ataque (Rebelde Sin Causa) – Discos Gas/Mexico – 1990
- Revolucion (Fulano De Tal) – Radio Vox Records – 1995
- Normal – (Fulano De Tal) – BMG/RCA – 1997
- Etc. – (Fulano) – Radio Vox/DLN – 2000
- Individual – (Fulano/Elsten Torres) – FM Records – 2006 (GRAMMY Nominated “Best Latin Pop Album”)
- “If You Say So” – (Elsten Torres) – Uno Entertainment – 2008
- "Waiting for Clouds" – (Elsten Torres) – Real Artificial Music – 2013
- “Borders” - (Hey Elsten) - Real Artificial Music – 2015
- Exitos Acusticos – (Fulano De Tal/Elsten Torres) – CMP 2016 (Greatest Hits album)
- Vamonos, Vamonos (Elsten y Los Damn Ramblers) – 2017
- “At the End of Love” (Elsten Torres) Warner/Chappell Music – 2020
- Nocturno – (Elsten Torres) - MFM+ – 2022
- Real Artificial – (Elsten Torres) - Inner Cat – 2024
- Vice Versa – (Elsten Torres/feat. Los Reggae Monks) – MFM+ – 2025

Compilations

• Latin Laugh Festival – BMG / RCA – 1998

• Tributo to the Cure – WEA Latina – 1999

• Una Decada de Rock – BMG – 2000

• Billboard Magazine (Interview) – 2007

• Al Borde Magazine (cover feature) Interview – 2007

• National Geographic – La Cuba de Hoy – 2017

• Billboard Magazine (Feature) – 2020

• Spanish Model (Elvis Costello) – 2021

• La Banda Elastica Magazine (feature) – 2024

• Radio 3 - Madrid (live interview) – 2025

Notable songs

- "Los Demas"; (top ten Billboard hit with Julio Iglesias Jr.)
- "Cristina Maria"; (hit single from the album Normal)
- "No Soy Gringo"; (hit single from the album Normal)
- "Caramelo"; (hit single for Alejandra Guzman)
- "Dejala Que Baile"; (hit song for Michael Stuart)
- "Todo El Año"; (Billboard #1 song with Obie Bermudez)
- "Por Una Mujer"; (Billboard top 20 song for Luis Fonsi)
- "Olvidare"; (hit single and video from the album Individual)
- "Selfish"; (hit single from the album Normal)
- "Normal"; (hit single from the album Normal)
- "Dando Vueltas"; (hit single and video from the album Individual)
- "Como Ayer" (song for Jimena Anger for her Grammy-nominated album Día Azul)
- "Closer Tonight" (features on Huawei smartphones as default music)
- "Si Aun Te Quieres Quedar" ("Closer Tonight" Spanish Version) recorded by David Bisbal
- "Closer Tonight" - (Theme song for 100th Anniversary of Freixenet Sparkling Wine) David Bisbal
- La Vida Cambia (Duet with Antonio Carmona of Ketama)
- "Borders" (single from the album At the End of Love)
- "Bendita Cuba" (tribute song for his mother)
- "Sobraran" (single from the album Nocturno)
- "Real Artificial" (single from the album Real Artificial)
- "Vive" (single from the album Vice Versa)
