= Something Quite Peculiar =

Studio album by The Dear & Departed
- Released: May 22, 2007
- Recorded: December 2006
- Genre: new wave, post-punk, indie rock
- Length: 57:22
- Label: Science (cat: #102396)
- Producer: Chris Vrenna & Jade Puget

Professional ratings
Review scores
Source	Rating
Allmusic	link

Something Quite Peculiar is the debut album by The Dear & Departed. The album was released May 22, 2007, on Science Records. It features the single "Tonight's the Night" and a cover of The Church's "Under the Milky Way". It was recorded in November and December 2006 at the Mouse House (Pasadena, CA), Hurley Studio (Costa Mesa, CA) and Chris Vrenna's private studio (Eagle Rock, CA).

== Track listing ==
All tracks are written by The Dear & Departed except "Under the Milky Way" by Steve Kilbey and Karin Jansson

No.	Title	Length
1.	"And We Begin..."	2:28
2.	"I Will Love Again"	3:02
3.	"Masquerade"	3:21
4.	"Fly Me Away"	4:36
5.	"Tonight's the Night"	3:58
6.	"Hometown Hero"	4:10
7.	"To Cut a Long Story Short"	5:07
8.	"Bordering on Ordinary"	4:14
9.	"Return to Sender"	5:00
10.	"Closer/Closure"	3:58
11.	"Are You Feeling Awkward Yet?"	3:49
12.	"The Fireflies"	4:35
13.	"Running Against the Wind"	4:27
14.	"Under the Milky Way" (The Church cover)	4:42

B-sides

1. "Day to Day"

2. "If You Say So"

3. "Run Away"

== Personnel ==
Band members

- Dan Under – vocals, backing vocals
- Simon O'Gorman – guitar
- Joel Bourne – drums
- Darren Parkinson – guitar
- David Williams – bass, backing vocals

Guest musicians

- Steven Looker – backing vocals
- Anthony Navarro – backing vocals
- Matt Baker – keyboards
- Dallas Green – vocals on "To Cut a Long Story Short"
- Jessica Origliasso – vocals on "Under the Milky Way"
- Roxy Buster – vocals on "Bordering on Ordinary" & "Return to Sender".
- Isabelle Buster – vocals on "Return to Sender".

Technical staff

- Chris Vrenna – producer, engineer
- Jade Puget – producer
- Kevin Estrada – cover photography
- Roc Aguilar – band photography
- Scott Wade – art direction & design
