= Fulano de Tal =

- Genres: Rock, Pop
- Years active: 1995–2000

Fulano de Tal was a North American Latin rock band, featuring lead singer Elsten Torres. Formed in 1995 in Miami, Florida, Fulano de Tal recorded two full-length albums. The first album was called Normal and it was released in April 1997 through BMG/RCA records. At the time, Fulano was the first north-American Latin rock band to be signed to a major label. The band toured extensively throughout the United States and some Latin American countries during the years of 1997 and 1999. In 1998, Billboard magazine called Fulano de Tal "one of the most popular rock acts in Miami".

In 2000, the band released their sophomore effort, Etc. through the independent label: Radio Vox/DLN. It was also in 2000 that the band separated. Brendan and Julian joined pop/superstar Shakira as part of her touring band. Elsten Torres released the Grammy nominated album, Individual in 2006 under the name "Fulano", but it was his first solo album although both Brendan and Julian joined in the production and performance of the album.

The name of the band is the Portuguese/Spanish variant of the American term "John Doe".

== Band members ==
The original band members were: Elsten Torres (Lead Vocals, Guitar, & Songwriter), Brendan Buckley (Drummer, programming, vocals), Julian Adam Zimmon (Guitars), and Leo Nobre (Bass guitar, Background vocals). John Michael Falcone (Bass guitar, Vocals) replaced Leo in 1996.

== Discography ==
=== Revolución ===
Revolución (in English – Revolution) is the first recording by singer/songwriter; Elsten Torres under the artistic name of "Fulano De Tal". Released in 1994 under the independent label, "Radio Vox". This EP contained one song in different genres. The version called, "mix de la tierra" was released as a single and also as a music video. The song received a great deal of critical and commercial attention because of its theme. The song was a protest song, regarding the Cuban rafters situation of the mid 1990s. There are also two English versions of the song, as well as a more pop version of the song in both English and Spanish.

1. Revolución – (Elsten Torres) – 4:06 (mix de la tierra)
2. Revolución – (Elsten Torres) – 5:30 (mix del cielo)
3. Revolution - (Elsten Torres) – 4:06 (acoustic pissed off mix)
4. Revolution - (Elsten Torres) – 5:32 (the island is gonna blow mix)
5. Revolución – (Elsten Torres) – 3:37 (version sangre)

==== Personnel ====
- Guitars & Lead Vocals: Elsten Torres a.k.a. Fulano De Tal
- Percussion & chants: Frank Lord
- Electric guitars: Cesar Lemos
- Bass: Julio Hernandez
- Programming and Keyboards: Rodolfo Castillo

=== Normal ===
Normal is the major label debut album of Fulano De Tal. Released in 1997 under the BMG/RCA label, this album was the first major release of any Latin Rock artist from the U.S.A. Songs released from the album included Cristina Maria, No Soy Gringo, and Los Demas. The band members were: Elsten Torres, Brendan Buckley, Julian Adam Zimmon, and John M. Falcone. They began touring throughout the U.S., Canada and Latin America for over 2 years until the release of their next album.

1. Cristina Maria - 4:39
2. No soy gringo - 3:30
3. Los Demas - 4:51
4. Estados Unidos - 4:38
5. Inquietud - 3:39
6. Afuera de mi cabeza - 3:22
7. Duele - 4:02
8. Complicated - 3:38
9. Selfish - 5:29
10. No quiero trabajar - 3:48
11. Normal - 6:48
12. Cuando me muera yo - 4:45

==== Personnel ====
- Guitars & Lead Vocals: Elsten Torres
- Drums, Percussion & Background vocals: Brendan Buckley
- Electric guitars: Julian Adam Zimmon
- Bass: John M. Falcone/Leo Nobre

All songs written by: Elsten Torres except, "Complicated" – by. Brendan Buckley/Elsten Torres

=== Etc. ===
Etc. is the second album of Fulano De Tal, and released in 2000 under the Radio Vox/DLN label. After the success of the band's major label debut, the band was disappointed with the labels direction, so they opted out of their contract and released the Indie album, "Etc", shortening its name to "Fulano". "Etc", was also very well received by the critics and fans. It consists of recordings done in both large studios and home studios. Shortly after the albums’ release the band went back out on the road for a short summer tour but the band broke up right after the end of the tour. Band members: Brendan Buckley and Julian Adam Zimmon joined pop-superstar, "Shakira's" touring band. "Etc" spun one hit "Caramelo" that was later covered by Mexican Rock/Pop Superstar Diva; Alejandra Guzmán.

1. Caramelo - 3:41
2. En Nombre De - 4:51
3. Ella - 4:21
4. No Doubt About It - 5:37
5. Waiting For A Dead Man - 5:36
6. If You Say So - 4:01
7. Se Le Quedo - 4:01
8. Malas Palabras - 4:33
9. Sitting Pretty - 3:49
10. Los Demas - 4:51
11. Everybody Wants To Be The Same - 3:52
12. Sopa Y Pan - 3:32

==== Personnel ====
- Guitars & Lead Vocals: Elsten Torres
- Drums, Percussion & Background vocals: Brendan Buckley
- Electric guitars: Julian Adam Zimmon
- Bass: John M. Falcone/Leo Nobre
