= Blaqk Audio =

American electronic music duo

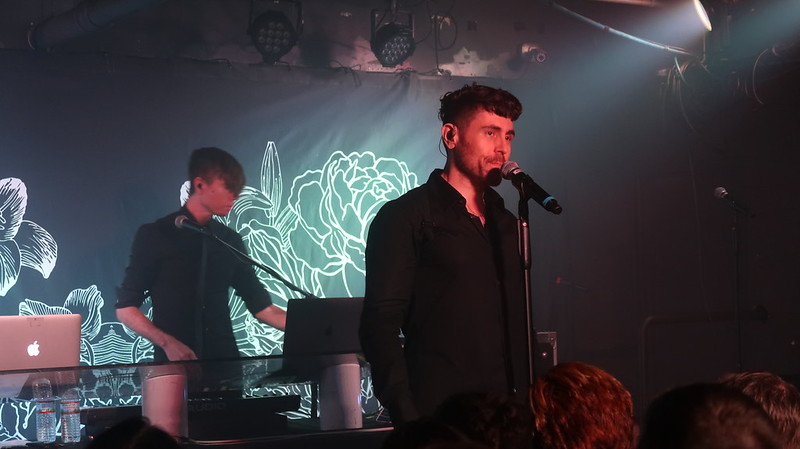
- Blaqk Audio performing. From left to right: Jade Puget and Davey Havok.

Background information
- Origin: Oakland, California, United States
- Genres: Synth-pop; EBM; dark wave
- Years active: 2000–present
- Labels: Interscope; Superball
- Members: Davey Havok; Jade Puget
- Website: www.blaqkaudio.com

Blaqk Audio is an American electronic music duo, formed by current AFI members Davey Havok and Jade Puget under Interscope Records.

Their debut album, CexCells, was released on August 14, 2007, and reached number eighteen on the Billboard 200. The band's second album, Bright Black Heaven, was released on September 11, 2012, under Superball Music's imprint Big Death. The first single from Bright Black Heaven, "Faith Healer", was released August 14, 2012. Their third album, Material, was released on April 15, 2016, and became their third consecutive album to debut at number one on the Billboard Dance/Electronic Albums chart.

Three additional albums, Only Things We Love, Beneath the Black Palms, and Trop d'amour were released in 2019, 2020, and 2022 respectively.

== History ==
=== Origins ===
Havok and Puget started writing music for Blaqk Audio during the writing process of AFI's album The Art of Drowning (2000), but they were too busy with AFI to devote enough time to the project. Their writing focused on electronic music; Havok had long been a fan of bands such as OMD. They returned to the project only in 2006, and the debut album CexCells was put out in August 2007.

AFI have increasingly included synthesized elements into their recent albums; 2003 release Sing the Sorrow and 2006 release Decemberunderground credit Puget with 'programming and keyboards'. These synthesized elements are particularly apparent on songs such as "Death of Seasons" and "37mm". In the August 2006 edition of Guitar World, Puget states that AFI songs "37mm" and "Love Like Winter" were both originally intended as part of the Blaqk Audio side project. Elements of programming, however, can be found as early as 2000s The Art of Drowning, which featured a drum machine on "The Despair Factor".

=== CexCells ===
Blaqk Audio entered the studio to record several songs for their first album in January 2007. Puget kept fans apprised with updates through his blog, before the Blaqk Audio Myspace was created in February 2007. By July 27, they had filmed footage for the music video for their debut single "Stiff Kittens", but the video was never finished. The album, CexCells, was released on August 14, 2007. Also in 2007, Puget collaborated with the German band Tokio Hotel, contributing a remix of "Ready, Set, Go!" called "Ready, Set, Go! (AFI/Blaqk Audio Remix)" to the American version of Scream. On January 12, 2008, Puget uploaded a new song to the Blaqk Audio Myspace titled "The Ligature".

Instrumental versions of the songs, "Between Breaths" and "The Love Letter" were used in trailers and on the official website for the 2008 film The Eye. In response to the buzz it created, Puget suggested at a possible public release of all the CexCells songs in instrumental form.

=== Bright Black Heaven ===
In July 2009, Blaqk Audio contributed a cover of "No New Tale to Tell" to the tribute album for Love and Rockets, New Tales to Tell: A Tribute to Love and Rockets.

While promoting AFI's new single "Medicate" on KROQ, Havok said that Blaqk Audio's second album was already completed, but they were focused on AFI as they felt "if all of a sudden we're doing two Blaqk Audio records in a row people will think AFI is not happening or something." Puget revealed that the name of the album as Bright Black Heaven. Despite the album being finished, the band continued working on new material. Over thirty songs were recorded for the album. Beginning in February 2010, the songs "Ill Lit Ships", "Bon Voyeurs", "Mouth to Mouth", and "Cold War" premiered through release on radio stations.

"The Witness" appeared on official soundtrack album of the 2011 movie Abduction, released on September 20. Another song called "Afterdark" appeared on the official soundtrack album of the video game Batman: Arkham City, released on October 4. Blaqk Audio performed at Subsonic Spookfest 2010, premiering three new songs: "This Is...", "Fade to White", and "Let's Be Honest". On November 25, Blaqk Audio posted a song titled "Down Here" on their SoundCloud page. On January 6, 2011, they performed a show at club Popscene in San Francisco, playing two new songs: "Say Red" and "Everybody's Friends". On July 23, a previously unheard song called "Bliss" was uploaded to their SoundCloud page, along with "Ill-Lit Ships" and "Mouth to Mouth".

In March 2012, Blaqk Audio toured Australia and New Zealand as a supporting act for Evanescence.

In June 2012, Blaqk Audio announced having been signed to Superball Music, and released Bright Black Heaven on September 11, 2012.

=== Material ===
Starting December 18, 2015, Blaqk Audio starting updating and teasing activity across social media. On February 10, 2016, they unveiled the single "Anointed". The single was available to purchase February 19, 2016. Blaqk Audio released their third studio album, Material, on April 15, 2016.

=== Only Things We Love ===
Havok said during an interview with Matt Pinfield that the new album will be out in spring of 2019 and that 69 songs were written to choose from. In January 2019, Havok visited the KITS (ALT 105.3) studios to showcase their brand new single "The Viles". While at the studio, Havok also confirmed the new album's title, Only Things We Love, which was released on March 15, 2019.

=== Beneath the Black Palms ===
On July 24, 2020, Blaqk Audio released a cryptic teaser video on their Instagram page. This was revealed on July 28 to be promotion for the band's fifth album, Beneath the Black Palms, which was released on August 21, 2020. The same day, the band surprise-released a digital EP consisting of the album's first 5 songs, titled Beneath the Black Palms (Side A), which was followed shortly by a visualizer video for the song "Hiss".

=== Trop d'amour ===
Blaqk Audio's sixth studio album, Trop d'amour, was released on September 16, 2022.

== Discography ==
=== Studio albums ===
Title	Album details	Peak chart positions			
Title	Album details	US	US Alt.	US Dance	AUS
CexCells	Released: August 14, 2007; Label: Interscope; Format: CD, digital download	18	5	1	86
Bright Black Heaven	Released: September 11, 2012; Label: Superball, Big Death; Formats: CD, Vinyl, digital download	43	12	1	—
Material	Released: April 15, 2016; Label: Blaqknoise/Kobalt Records; Formats: CD, vinyl, digital download	—	21	1	—
Only Things We Love	Released: March 15, 2019; Label: Kobalt Records; Formats: CD, vinyl, digital download	—	—	12	—
Beneath the Black Palms	Released: August 21, 2020; Label: BMG; Formats: Vinyl, digital download	—	—	—	—
Trop d’amour	Released: September 16, 2022; Label: Blaqknoise; Formats: Vinyl, digital download	—	—	—	—

=== Singles ===
Title	Year	Peak chart positions		Album
Title	Year	US Alt.	US Dance	Album
"Stiff Kittens"	2007	20	38	CexCells
"Faith Healer"	2012	—	—	Bright Black Heaven
"Anointed"	2016	—	—	Material
"First to Love"	2016	—	—	Material
"You Spin Me Round (Like a Record)"	2016	—	—	Non-album single
"The Viles"	2019	—	—	Only Things We Love
"Blue Cherry"	2022	—	—	Trop d'amour
"Cowboy Nights"	2022	—	—	Trop d'amour
"Absolute Scenes"	2022	—	—	Trop d'amour
"Father Figure"	2022	—	—	Non-album single

=== Other appearances ===
Title	Year	Album
"Stiff Kittens" (Jnrsnchz Blaqkout Remix)	2009	Underworld: Rise of the Lycans: Original Motion Picture Soundtrack
"No New Tale to Tell"	2009	New Tales to Tell: A Tribute to Love and Rockets
"The Witness"	2011	Abduction: Original Motion Picture Soundtrack
"Afterdark"	2011	Batman: Arkham City – The Album

=== Music videos ===
Title	Year	Director(s)
"If Only"	2007	Josh Stern and Blaqk Audio
"Faith Healer"	2012	Daniel Raschko
"Ill Lit Ships"	2014	Travis Kopach
"Anointed"	2016	Unknown
"First to Love"	2016	Adam Mason
"The Viles"	2019	Adam Mason
"Bird Sister"	2020	Unknown
"Cowboy Nights"	2022	Adam Mason

== Band members ==
- Davey Havok – lead vocals, lyricist
- Jade Puget – keyboard, synthesizer, backing vocals, composer
