= The Dear & Departed =

American rock band

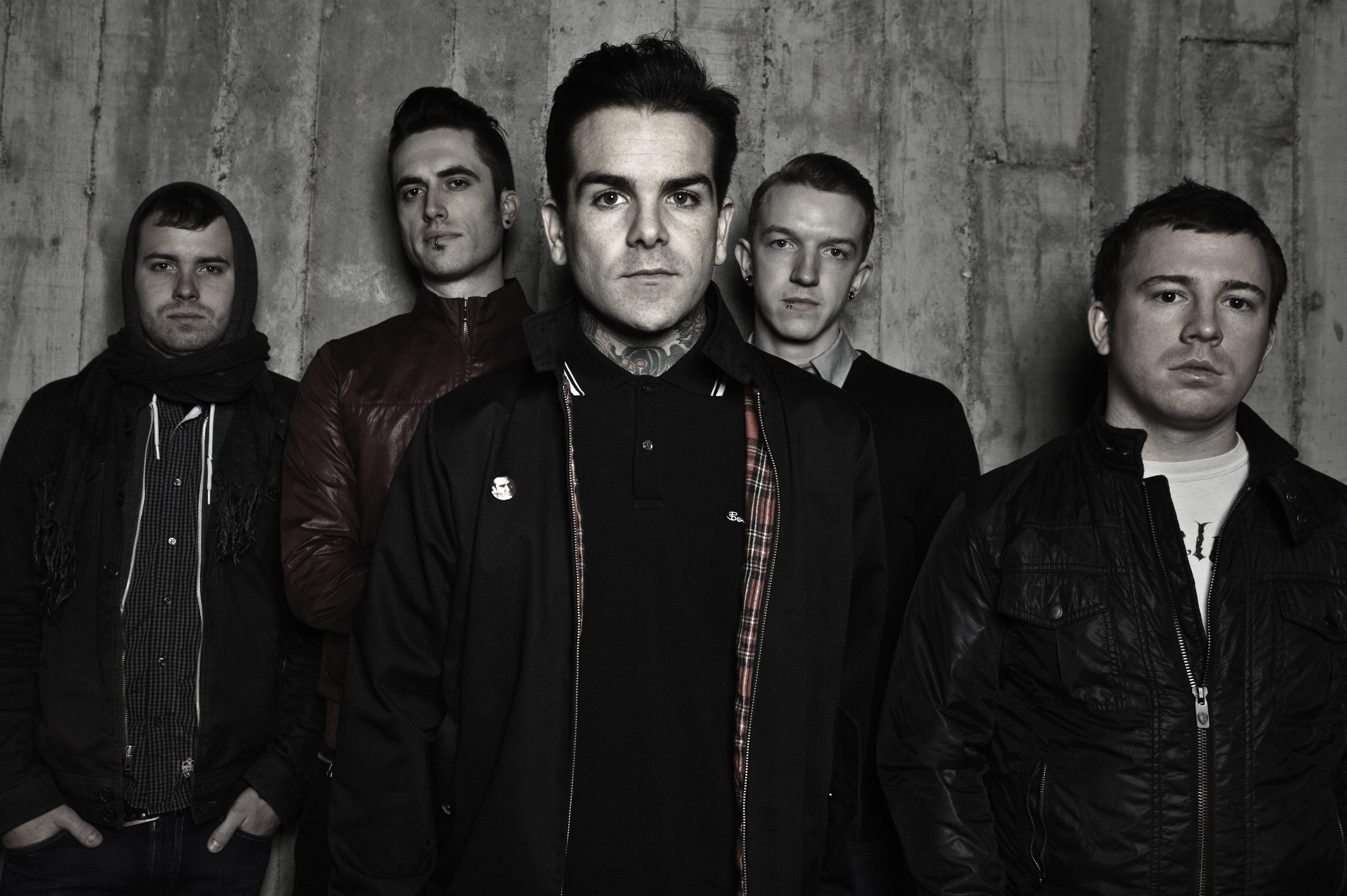
- L–R: Cortney, Keath, Dan, Darren, Jimmy

Background information
- Also known as: TD&D, D&D, Dear and Departed
- Origin: Auckland, New Zealand and Orange County, California, U.S.
- Genres: New wave, indie rock, post-punk
- Years active: 2006–2012
- Labels: Science Records, Equal Vision Records
- Members: Dan Smith; Darren Parkinson; Cortney Miner; Jimmy Walsh; Keath Moon
- Past members: Simon O'Gorman; Joel Bourne; Lisa Marx; David Williams
- Website: thedearanddeparted.com

The Dear & Departed was an American rock band from Orange County and Los Angeles, California, founded by Dan Smith. Founded in 2006, the band went on the Vans Warped Tour and released their debut album Something Quite Peculiar that same year. In 2007, the band again played on the tour, and some other tours followed. After releasing an EP in January 2010, the band went into the studio in late 2010 to work on their next album titled, Every Waking Moment, which was released on Equal Vision Records on November 8, 2011. As of July 13, 2012, the band had split up.

== History ==
Dan Smith (a.k.a. Dan Under) made his mark growing up in New Zealand. There, his music career blossomed playing for countless bands in the New Zealand punk/hardcore scene and Smith was active in both show promotion and underground record labels. Dan left New Zealand in 2001 to pursue his music further and also his rapidly growing tattooing career. After spending two years mostly in Australia, he migrated to the United States in 2005. Dan continues to return to New Zealand regularly and is a spokesperson for the country on the TLC hit TV show LA Ink.

The band was signed by Science Records, going on the Vans Warped Tour and working with other experienced artists and producers. Working with producer Chris Vrenna, they recorded their debut album, Something Quite Peculiar, in December 2006. Vrenna has worked with such bands as U2, Smashing Pumpkins, Killing Joke, Nine Inch Nails, Marilyn Manson and Gnarls Barkley.

In 2007, the band shared the stage with bands such as AFI, Sick of It All, Saosin, Norma Jean, Alexisonfire and Avenged Sevenfold. They participated in the Vans Warped Tour 2007. Simon O'Gorman left the band in December 2007 and Matt Baker, who contributed keyboards on Something Quite Peculiar, filled a touring position for Tiger Army and Revolution Mother tours.

On May 8, 2008, the band posted a blog stating that the band were parting ways with Joel Bourne and David Williams, who were succeeded by Cortney Miner and Jimmy Walsh in September 2008. Dan Smith's obligations filming the hit TLC TV show LA Ink in 2009 put touring on hold, but with a more concrete lineup the band was very active in writing new material with Cortney Miner being the main writer. January 2010, after signing with Equal Vision Records, saw the release of Chapters, a five-song EP. In 2010 the band toured with Alkaline Trio and Cursive around America and in the United Kingdom with AFI and Sick of It All before entering the studio in August/September 2010 to work on their new full-length album Every Waking Moment.

The band uses guest vocals from bands such as AFI and Gin Blossoms on their new album. Lead singer Dan Smith has also appeared on a few AFI albums. He talks about his friendship with AFI frontman Davey Havok in an interview with online magazine Coup De Main.

Their new album, Every Walking Moment, was released on November 8, 2011. It is the band's first full-length offering for Equal Vision and was produced by Chad Gilbert (New Found Glory, A Day to Remember). Davey Havok frontman of AFI, has provided backing vocals for the album and features in the song "Smile and Nod".

== Members ==
- Dan Smith – vocals
- Darren Parkinson – guitar
- Scott Sprigg – guitar
- Jimmy Walsh – drums
- Cortney Miner – guitar

== Discography ==
=== Demos & EPs ===
- Demo (2006)
- Sampler (exclusively available on tour)
- Chapters, January 2010

=== Albums ===
- Something Quite Peculiar, May 2007
- Every Waking Moment, November 2011

== Tours ==
- AFI and Sick of It All (2007)
- Vans Warped Tour (2007)
- Avenged Sevenfold (2007)
- Alkaline Trio, Cursive (band) (2010) US Tour
- AFI, Sick of It All (2010) UK Tour
- Alkaline Trio (2012) UK Tour
