= I Heard a Voice – Live from Long Beach Arena =

Video by AFI
- Released: December 12, 2006 (DVD); November 13, 2007 (CD)
- Recorded: September 15, 2006
- Venue: Long Beach Arena, Long Beach, California
- Length: 72:00
- Label: Interscope

AFI chronology
Clandestine (2003)	I Heard a Voice – Live from Long Beach Arena (2006)

CD cover
- CD cover version

I Heard a Voice – Live from Long Beach Arena is the first live DVD release from the rock band AFI. It was released on December 12, 2006. The concert was filmed at the Long Beach Arena in Long Beach, California on Friday, September 15, 2006. Part of the Decemberunderground Tour, the crowd was the largest AFI had ever headlined with over 13,000 people in attendance. The concert was shot in HD with more than 23 cameras. The title of this DVD is lifted from a line of poetry in the decemberunderground CD booklet. Underneath the song "37mm", it says: "The power went out. I turned on the radio. The power went out. I turned on the radio. The power went out. I turned on the radio...I heard a voice." The moth (which appears to be some species of hummingbird moth) on the case is also from the decemberunderground booklet.

Throughout the week before the release, the concert film was shown as a screening in various cities. Attendants received a limited edition two-sided poster.

A CD version was released on November 13, 2007.

== Track listing ==
No.	Title	Original release	Length
1.	"Prelude 12/21"	Decemberunderground (2006)	2:04
2.	"Girl's Not Grey"	Sing the Sorrow (2003)	3:12
3.	"The Leaving Song Pt. II"	Sing the Sorrow (2003)	4:20
4.	"Summer Shudder"	Decemberunderground (2006)	3:16
5.	"Kill Caustic"	Decemberunderground (2006)	2:50
6.	"The Days of the Phoenix"	The Art of Drowning (2000)	4:04
7.	"Endlessly, She Said"	Decemberunderground (2006)	4:34
8.	"A Single Second"	Shut Your Mouth and Open Your Eyes (1997)	2:45
9.	"The Missing Frame"	Decemberunderground (2006)	4:40
10.	"Bleed Black"	Sing the Sorrow (2003)	4:28
11.	"Silver and Cold"	Sing the Sorrow (2003)	5:12
12.	"Dancing Through Sunday"	Sing the Sorrow (2003)	2:34
13.	"This Time Imperfect"	Sing the Sorrow (2003)	4:33
14.	"Death of Seasons"	Sing the Sorrow (2003)	5:14
15.	"Totalimmortal"	All Hallow's E.P. (1999)	4:31
16.	"Love Like Winter"	Decemberunderground (2006)	3:10
17.	"God Called in Sick Today"	Black Sails in the Sunset (1999)	4:50
18.	"Miss Murder"	Decemberunderground (2006)	3:38
Total length:			72:00

== Featured performers ==
The song "A Single Second" features a guest performance by Nick 13 of the band Tiger Army.

== DVD features ==
- Contains 5.1 audio mix.
- Includes interviews with The Despair Faction members and a photo gallery.
- By clicking the moth logo within the 'Extras' menu, you can access the four videos that featured during AFI's 'Five Flowers' mystery hunt. Each video contains a different member of AFI. This is an Easter egg.

== Chart positions ==
=== DVD ===
Chart	Peak position
Australia ARIA DVD Chart	2
US Music Video Sales (Billboard)	8

=== CD ===
Chart (2017)	Peak position
US Billboard 200	133
US Top Hard Rock Albums (Billboard)	16
