= Fly in the Ointment =

Fly in the Ointment may refer to:

- "A Fly in the Ointment", an episode of Chip 'n Dale Rescue Rangers
- Fly in the ointment, an English-language idiomatic expression
- Fly in the Ointment (EP), a 1995 EP by AFI
- "Fly in the Ointment", an instrumental from the 1973 album Ooh La La by Faces
- The Fly in the Ointment, a 1990 book by Alice Thomas Ellis
- The Fly in the Ointment: 70 Fascinating Commentaries on the Science of Everyday Life, a 2004 book by Joseph A. Schwarcz
