= AFI (2017 album) =

Studio album by AFI
- Released: January 20, 2017
- Recorded: 2016
- Studios: Megawatt Recording, Valley Village, California, United States
- Genres: Post-punk; new wave; gothic rock
- Length: 46:34
- Label: Concord
- Producers: Jade Puget; Matt Hyde

AFI chronology
Burials (2013)	AFI (2017)	The Missing Man (2018)

Singles from AFI
- 1. "Snow Cats" Released: October 28, 2016; 2. "White Offerings" Released: December 8, 2016; 3. "Aurelia" Released: January 30, 2017; 4. "Hidden Knives" Released: May 3, 2017

AFI (also referred to as The Blood Album) is the tenth studio album by American rock band AFI. It was released on January 20, 2017, through Concord Bicycle Music. The album release includes four limited sleeve art and vinyl color variants, corresponding to each of the four members of AFI, and associated with each of the four blood groups (A, AB, B and O).

Hailed by some critics as a comeback album, AFI saw the band experiment into post-punk and new wave sounds, which echoed off of the band's side projects, particularly Blaqk Audio and Dreamcar, which all infused elements of these genres. The album was noted for a strong influence of the band's childhood influences, particularly the likes of Morrissey, Echo and The Bunnymen, The Cure, and Joy Division. The decision to explore this route was both hailed and criticized by contemporary music critics. Some critics felt that this direction marked one of the most ambitious albums by AFI, while others felt it was done as a cautious move to appeal to mainstream audiences.

Commercially, AFI was the band's most successful domestic album since Decemberunderground, debuting at number 5 on the Billboard 200, with 29,000 equivalent music units moved. It was the band's third album to debut in the top five in the Billboard 200, and tied with Sing the Sorrow as the second highest debut album for AFI in the United States. In Australia, AFI debuted at 12 on the ARIA Charts, being their strongest release on the album since Decemberunderground as well. In Canada and the United Kingdom, the album did not sell as well as previous efforts.

== Background and recording ==
After the conclusion of the Burials tour, members of AFI undertook several side projects. Vocalist Davey Havok and guitarist Jade Puget focused on the hardcore band called XTRMST, which released its eponymous debut album in 2014. Havok and Puget also worked on a third studio album with Blaqk Audio which was released in 2016. Finally, in late 2016 Havok worked with members of No Doubt on a new wave supergroup, called Dreamcar. This led to speculation about the band breaking up.

In a June 2016 interview with Aggressive Tendencies, Jade Puget confirmed that AFI had begun working on new material for their tenth studio album, but chose not to reveal more information about it, including the release date. About 60 songs were written for the album.

The album was recorded at Megawatt Recording in the Valley Village neighborhood of Los Angeles, with Jade Puget as the main producer, and Matt Hyde as co-producer. Hyde handled recording, while Marcel Fernandez and Thomas Bellier did additional engineering. Hyde mixed the recordings, before the album was mastered by Tom Baker at Baker Mastering.

== Artwork and title ==
The album cover, designed by Frank Maddocks, is dark red and features three stylized blood drops—which are a window to the gatefold. While the album title does not appear on the cover, AFI (The Blood Album) is printed on a sticker on the shrink wrapping. On the album title, Havok states:

I started to recognize the reoccurrence of blood in the lyrics that I was writing for what would eventually become the record. I brought it to Jade's attention early on in the process as something we might want to revisit at the time we decided what was generally gonna comprise the finished record.

When we got to that point, "Blood Album" seemed an appropriate subtitle for the record. We self-titled the record officially to give a bit of a ceremonious nod to it being our 10th record as a band.

== Music and composition ==
The album has been noted for having elements of the band's traditional horror punk and gothic rock influences, but has been noted for infusing elements of post-punk and new wave on the record. Gen Handley, writing for Alternative Press interviewed Jade Puget about the post-punk and new-wave influences on the record, Puget said that there really is elements of it, although it was not his or Havok's intention when writing songs for the record. Puget said "these directions just come out of us for one reason or another. People have been saying that AFI is ’80s for like 15 years now, so the fact there is New Wave on there isn’t that surprising."

Puget further noted several tracks on AFI that had evident influences of new wave. Specifically, he referred to "Above the Bridge" and "Feed From the Floor" which he said, had a Cure-esque feel to them. "That kind of music is just what we listened to when growing up, and I really love that element of the record."

== Release and promotion ==
On October 17, 2016, a few days after blacking out their profile pictures on social media, AFI began posting cryptic teaser videos on their Facebook and Twitter accounts. Later that week, the band released a teaser of their first song in three years via a Facebook live video.

When describing the length of time (four years) between AFI and their previous album, Burials, Havok said "we just come from the place of wanting to be 100% happy with the works we create, rather than fulfilling some sort of demand, whether it be from a label or a consumer. It’s really the modern standard of short attention spans, and it puts us in a difficult position. Quantity typically eclipses quality these days, but we can’t bow to that." Havok referenced the time span of four years as well between Crash Love and Burials, which was also a four-year gap (2009 to 2013).

Ahead of its January 20, 2017 release, AFI was listed as one of the most anticipated albums of 2017 by Alternative Press.

=== Singles ===
On October 27, the band released two new songs, "Snow Cats" and "White Offerings", via their Spotify and with audio on their YouTube channel.

=== Music videos ===
The first music video for AFI was "White Offerings", which was released on the band's YouTube and Vevo channels on December 12, 2016. The video begins with a woman who is wearing half black facial mask and half white facial mask. It pans into the band playing on an entirely white music set with white geometric shapes. Throughout the video, black paint drips on to several of the white objects. The video ends with Havok attending a banquet alone before the song ends with a mic drop, then walks past the slate to stare directly into the camera for several seconds, which was done to break the fourth wall as a transition to the "Snow Cats" music video. The video was directed by Drew Kirsch and produced by Lex Lewter. Dan Epstein, writing for the Rolling Stone described the music video as "dramatic" and the song itself as "muscular".

In an interview with Rolling Stone, Havok said that the white assemblage for the music video was Kirsch's concept. Havok said he wanted the video to be a performance video, but also have looping moments that touched on the lyrical themes of the song. Of Kirsch's vision, Havok said "when we saw [Kirsch’s] treatment, we thought it really did a good job of drawing in those themes of connection, imperceptions, incompatibility and transference that you hear in the lyrics." The white backdrop was described as "mesmerizing" by Caitlyn Ralph of Alternative Press.

On January 5, 2017, AFI released the second music video ahead of the album's release, for their single, "Snow Cats". The video, also directed by Kirsch depicts a constant moving visual throughout the video. In an interview with Pitchfork, Havok said the video is to "animate a cyclical struggle with the surreal colors of applied persona and identity". Noise magazine described the visuals and effects as "interstellar" and "futuristic".

Ten days after AFI was released, the third music video, "Aurelia" was released. The video features facial closeups of the band members, particularly of their eyes and mouths. Critics and journalists noted that the video seemed to be focused on being uncomfortably up close and personal about issues, as well as show the signs of human aging over time. Zach Dionne, writing for Fuse described the music video as "intimate".

The fourth and final music video, for the track, "Hidden Knives", aired on May 3, 2017. The music video was inspired by silent movies of the early 20th century and involved a murder mystery at a masquerade party.

== Critical reception ==
Professional ratings
Aggregate scores
Source	Rating
AnyDecentMusic?	6.7/10
Metacritic	77/100
Review scores
Source	Rating
AllMusic	4.5/5 stars
Alternative Press	4/5 stars
The A.V. Club	B+
Clash Music	7/10 stars
Classic Rock	3.5/5 stars
Consequence of Sound	C+
Drowned in Sound	7/10
Exclaim!	6/10
Kerrang!	5/5 stars
Pitchfork	5.0/10

AFI was well received by most contemporary music critics. On review aggregator website, Metacritic, which normalizes music ratings, AFI received an average score of 77 out of 100, indicating "generally favorable reviews based on 14 critics". On AnyDecentMusic?, AFI received an average rating of 6.7/10 based on 10 contemporary music critic reviews. Most critics that praised the album admired the ambition of the band to test the waters of post-punk and new wave, while critics that were negative about the album felt it was too much of a departure from the band's early sound, and felt bland and predictable.

In a staff article by Kerrang! magazine, the staff gave five stars out of five stating that "You better get ready to start your "Best Albums of 2017" list—a serious contender has arrived." On their end of the year list, Kerrang! listed AFI as the 13th best album of 2017. Writing for The A.V. Club, Annie Zaleski praised the album, and said the band felt "refreshed" and "rejuvenated" praising the glam rock and jangle pop influences from Morrissey and Echo and The Bunnymen, saying that AFI "doesn’t reinvent the wheel, it doesn’t need to: The record illustrates that the members of AFI are deeply committed to forward motion, and remain as fired up now as they were 25 years ago." Zaleski gave the album a B+ grade.

Like Zaleski, Neil Yueng of Allmusic praised what he felt was ambition from the band, stating that "there's certainly enough here to prove that post-Nitro AFI are a better and stronger group, unafraid to continue pushing their sound with each release." Yueng compared the works of AFI with the works of The Cure, Joy Division, and Depeche Mode. Yueng gave the album four stars out of five.

Megan Roos, writing for Consequence of Sound believe that the album had strong moments, but felt ultimately it tried too hard to appeal to everyone. Roos was primarily disappointed that the album did not touch so much on their hardcore punk and horror punk roots. Roos said that "it's not that the record isn’t good – it possesses potential chart-climbers and bittersweet moments that’ll make fans nostalgic for the group’s early punk days." Roos summarized that AFI felt too safe and cautious, "they chose the shelter of mainstream acceptance, a predictable – if disappointing – decision."

In a staff review by Punknews.org, the impression of the album was more mixed. The staff felt the album was too cautious and predictable. The staff summarized the album stating that "you do get a sense of what could have been, had they just unchained themselves a bit more. Ironically, the songs that stand out the most here are the ones that ape tracks off Sing The Sorrow." Punknews.org gave the album three stars out of five Ian Cohen, writing for Pitchfork echoed these sentiments saying that it was predictable. Cohen also felt the album was rushed, feeling that album could have been their comeback album. Cohen stated that "at least half of The Blood Album’s songs feel virtually interchangeable and the other half sound like AFI wrote this stuff in the time it takes to play it." Cohen ultimately gave the album a 5.0 out of 10.

== Commercial performance ==
AFI debuted at No. 5 on the Billboard 200 with 29,000 equivalents units moved.

== Track listing ==
All lyrics are written by Davey Havok; all music is composed by Jade Puget.

No.	Title	Length
1.	"Dark Snow"	3:17
2.	"Still a Stranger"	2:49
3.	"Aurelia"	2:54
4.	"Hidden Knives"	2:56
5.	"Get Hurt"	3:44
6.	"Above the Bridge"	3:28
7.	"So Beneath You"	3:19
8.	"Snow Cats"	3:20
9.	"Dumb Kids"	2:40
10.	"Pink Eyes"	3:28
11.	"Feed from the Floor"	4:09
12.	"White Offerings"	2:50
13.	"She Speaks the Language"	4:01
14.	"The Wind That Carries Me Away"	3:38
Total length:		46:34

== Personnel ==
Personnel per booklet.

AFI

- Davey Havok – lead vocals
- Jade Puget – guitars, programming
- Hunter Burgan – bass, programming
- Adam Carson – drums

Production and design

- Jade Puget – production
- Matt Hyde – co-production, mixing, recording
- Marcel Fernandez – additional engineering
- Thomas Bellier – additional engineering
- Tom Baker – mastering
- Frank Maddocks – art direction, design
- Jiro Schneider – band photography

== Charts ==
Chart (2017)	Peak position
Australian Albums (ARIA)	12
Belgian Albums (Ultratop Flanders)	200
Canadian Albums (Billboard)	20
New Zealand Heatseekers Albums (RMNZ)	1
Scottish Albums (Official Charts)	61
UK Albums (Official Charts)	69
US Billboard 200	5
US Digital Albums (Billboard)	2
US Top Album Sales (Billboard)	65
US Top Alternative Albums (Billboard)	1
US Top Hard Rock Albums (Billboard)	1
US Top Rock Albums (Billboard)	2
US Indie Store Album Sales (Billboard)	3
US Vinyl Albums (Billboard)	2
