= Snow Cats =

Single by AFI

from the album AFI
- B-side: "White Offerings"
- Released: October 28, 2016
- Recorded: 2016
- Genre: Alternative rock
- Length: 6:11
- Label: Concord
- Songwriter(s): Davey Havok, Jade Puget

AFI singles chronology
"Heart Stops" (2014)	"Snow Cats" (2016)	"White Offerings" (2016)

"Snow Cats" is a song by American rock band AFI. It was released as the lead single from their self-titled, tenth studio album AFI (The Blood Album) in 2016. It peaked at number 39 on the US Alternative Songs chart.

== Track listing ==
All tracks are written by AFI

No.	Title	Length
1.	"Snow Cats"	3:21
2.	"White Offerings"	2:50
Total length:		6:11

== Chart positions ==
Chart (2016)	Peak position
US Alternative Airplay (Billboard)	39
US Spotify Viral 50 (Billboard)	49
