= Love Like Winter =

Single by AFI

from the album Decemberunderground
- Released: September 26, 2006
- Recorded: 2005
- Genre: Emo; alternative rock; post-punk revival; synthpop; scene music
- Length: 2:45
- Label: Interscope
- Songwriters: Hunter Burgan; Adam Carson; David Paden Marchand; Jade Puget
- Producer: Jerry Finn

AFI singles chronology
"Miss Murder" (2006)	"Love Like Winter" (2006)	"The Missing Frame" (2007)

"Love Like Winter" is a song by American rock band AFI. It was released as the second single from their seventh studio album Decemberunderground. "Love Like Winter" was released to radio on September 26, 2006. A music video for the song premiered on TRL on September 26, 2006, and was directed by Marc Webb, who has also directed previous music videos for the band: "The Days of the Phoenix", "The Leaving Song Pt. II", and "Miss Murder". The short version of the music video was released on iTunes along with the live video from I Heard a Voice – Live from Long Beach Arena in December 2006 as an EP called the Love Like Winter EP.

The song charted at number four on the Alternative Songs chart, number 68 on the Billboard Hot 100, and number 71 on the Billboard Pop 100. The song also charted in the United Kingdom, Australia and Portugal.

== Track listing ==
1. "Love Like Winter" – 2:45
2. "Jack the Ripper" (Morrissey cover) – 2:47
3. "On the Arrow" – 3:07
4. "Love Like Winter" (music video) – 2:46

== Music video ==
On September 26, 2006, AFI appeared on Total Request Live to premiere the music video. It peaked at number one shortly afterward, then retired at number seven, spending 40 days on the countdown.

The band appears in a snowy forest and they die one by one, leaving lead singer Davey Havok as the only remaining member. Havok chases after a mysterious woman played by Christina Petrovic, who reveals herself as evil. After Havok collapses through the ice and attempts to rescue himself, she appears behind him and the two share a kiss. Havok dies and is shown sinking into the water at the end of the music video, with the mysterious woman.

The video (directed by Marc Webb) was said to be inspired by Quentin Tarantino's Kill Bill: Volume 1 duology and Tim Burton's Sleepy Hollow.

On November 15, 2006, a long version was released on Yahoo!. The video contains additional footage at the beginning of the music video and features the outro to the preceding track on Decemberunderground, "The Interview". It features the band members roaming around the snowy forest, as well as the mysterious woman. It features five quick flashes as well, the first four containing frames from videos AFI made during their "5 Flowers" mystery that ended with fans receiving secret passes to shows in April 2006. The fifth frame features the word 'ÞrírÞrírSjö' over the cover of "The Leaving Song Pt. II" 7" from their previous studio album Sing the Sorrow. The word is Icelandic for "three three seven". On November 17, 2006, the extended version was removed from Yahoo!. However, it was eventually re-released on the site and became viewable on YouTube. It is available for digital download on iTunes as well.

== Charts ==
=== Weekly charts ===
Weekly chart performance for "Love Like Winter"
Chart (2006–2007)	Peak Position
Australia (ARIA)	44
Scottish Singles Sales (Official Charts)	50
UK Singles (Official Charts)	76
UK Rock & Metal (Official Charts)	3
US Billboard Hot 100	68
US Alternative Airplay (Billboard)	4
US Pop 100 (Billboard)	71

=== Year-end charts ===
Year-end chart performance for "Love Like Winter"
Chart (2007)	Position
US Alternative Songs (Billboard)	31
