= Bodies (AFI album) =

Studio album by AFI
- Released: June 11, 2021
- Recorded: 2019–2020
- Genre: Post-punk; new wave; synth rock; punk rock
- Length: 36:03
- Label: Rise; Ex Noctum Nacimur
- Producer: Jade Puget

AFI chronology
The Missing Man (2018)	Bodies (2021)	Silver Bleeds the Black Sun... (2025)

Singles from Bodies
- 1. "Twisted Tongues" / "Escape from Los Angeles" Released: January 14, 2021; 2. "Looking Tragic" / "Begging for Trouble" Released: February 25, 2021; 3. "Dulcería" / "Far Too Near" Released: April 9, 2021; 4. "Tied to a Tree" Released: May 26, 2021

Bodies is the eleventh studio album by American rock band AFI. The album was released through Rise Records on June 11, 2021, and was their only release on the label.

Seven singles, six of which were concurrently released as double A-sides, were released ahead of the album: "Twisted Tongues" / "Escape from Los Angeles" were the lead-off singles, released in January 2021. Both charted in the Billboard Alternative Digital Songs, making it their first album since Burials that had multiple singles chart. The third and fourth singles, "Looking Tragic / Begging for Trouble" were released in February 2021. The fifth and sixth singles, "Dulcería / Far Too Near" were concurrently released in mid-April 2021. The final single, "Tied to a Tree", was released as a standalone A-side, and was released in late May 2021, two weeks before the album release.

Critically, the album was met with polarized reviews, and became the band's first album to not chart on the Billboard 200 since Black Sails in the Sunset, although it did reach number 33 on the US Top Album Sales chart.

== Background ==
According to AFI frontman Davey Havok, the album was written in 2019 and finished by early 2020, prior to COVID-19 lockdowns, which had no impact on the album.

On March 28, 2020, guitarist Jade Puget was interviewed by Kerrang! to promote a headlining appearance at 2000trees. He said that while he did not expect the band's eleventh album to be released by the time of the performance, "hopefully at least a couple of songs will be." During an Instagram livestream on April 27, 2020, Puget said that the album was finished, but that its release date was being pushed back as a result of the COVID-19 pandemic.

On January 1, 2021, the band announced that their eleventh studio album would be released before the end of the year. On January 15, they released the tracks "Twisted Tongues" and "Escape from Los Angeles". On February 25, it was revealed that the album would be called Bodies, and be released on June 11. Along with the announcement, the band revealed two new songs as another joint single, "Looking Tragic / Begging for Trouble". Additionally, a music video was released for "Looking Tragic". On April 9, "Dulceria / Far Too Near" were released, along with a music video for the former song, which was co-written by Billy Corgan. On May 25, the song "Tied to a Tree" was released. Puget called it his favorite from the album. A music video for the song, directed by Linda Strawberry, was released on July 8.

A short film using music from the album, titled Where We Used to Meet, was directed by Kes Glozier. It premiered in Los Angeles on September 28 with an online screening two days later and a wide YouTube release on June 13, 2022. An outtake from the album titled "Caught", which Havok explained was excluded "for a better album flow", debuted at the premiere and was subsequently released online and as a 7-inch single. Drummer Adam Carson applauded the track, although he did not play on it.

The band toured in support of the album in 2022 with Cold Cave.

== Album art ==
The album artwork was designed by Donny Phillips for KIHL Studio. The standard CD/vinyl editions feature a grey-on-black color palette, and the three-gender logo that appears on various promotional material is printed on the disc. A Target-exclusive CD edition comes with an alternate album cover, which shows a gold-on-black version of the three-gender logo, which is also included as a patch. The vinyl edition's top cover slip (displaying the title and track listing) is detachable.

The standard CD version has a printing error which lists the album's final song as the twelfth song instead of the eleventh.

== Critical reception ==
Professional ratings
Aggregate scores
Source	Rating
AnyDecentMusic?	5.8/10
Metacritic	67/100
Review scores
Source	Rating
AllMusic	4/5 stars
Classic Rock	7/10
DIY	4/5 stars
Exclaim!	3/10
Kerrang!	3/5 stars
Spectrum Culture	45/100
Sputnikmusic	3.0/5
Upset	4/5 stars

Bodies was met with mixed reviews from most contemporary music critics. On the review aggregator website Metacritic, which normalizes music ratings, Bodies received an average score of 67 out of 100, indicating "generally favorable reviews based on seven critics". On AnyDecentMusic?, Bodies received an average rating of 5.8/10 based on eight contemporary music critic reviews, indicating mixed reviews.

In a positive review for DIY magazine, Ben Tipple gave the album four stars out of five, stating that AFI "have landed on a sound both contemporary and unmistakably theirs," praising the band's horror punk and gothic rock sounds with elements of new wave. James Hickie of Kerrang! gave a more mixed review of the band's fusion of genres, saying, "the band's desire to suffuse their sound with new tones and textures is admirable and frequently pays dividends, but there are moments when that drive to evolve leads them to either cleave too close to other bands or stray too far from their own fundamentals." Hickie gave the album three stars out of five.

Neil Yeung of AllMusic gave Bodies a positive review, and specifically noted the instrumentation of the album, particularly that of Puget and Carson. Yeung called much of the album's instrumentation a "wild synth bop that sounds like a Blaqk Audio outtake set to guitars". Yeung further noted that Havok "remains the unmistakable center of attention, his poetic lyrics and passionate delivery injecting a much-needed vulnerability that challenges the overt masculine energy of the genre". Yeung gave the album four stars out of five.

Exclaim! writer Adam Feibel panned the album, rating it a 3 out of 10. Feibel described it as "a mostly lifeless album that puts [AFI] at perhaps their lowest moment". He further said, "with Bodies, they sound lost without an identity. There's barely anything that's exciting or memorable, and when it surprises, it's only in the wrong ways. The band sounds about 30 years less experienced than they are." Thomas Stremfel, writing for Spectrum Culture, also reviewed the album negatively, saying, "Bodies sounds like AFI phoning it in. As easy as it is to praise a few of the songs in the tracklist, it doesn't negate the majority of the project's unwillingness to take chances outside of a couple anomalies." Stremfel rated the album 45 out of 100.

== Track listing ==
All lyrics are written by Davey Havok; all music is composed by AFI (Davey Havok, Adam Carson, Hunter Burgan, Jade Puget), except track 3 co-written with Billy Corgan.

No.	Title	Length
1.	"Twisted Tongues"	4:01
2.	"Far Too Near"	2:48
3.	"Dulcería"	4:53
4.	"On Your Back"	2:20
5.	"Escape from Los Angeles"	3:24
6.	"Begging for Trouble"	2:20
7.	"Back from the Flesh"	2:59
8.	"Looking Tragic"	2:37
9.	"Death of the Party"	2:21
10.	"No Eyes"	3:33
11.	"Tied to a Tree"	4:47
Total length:		36:03

== Personnel ==
AFI

- Davey Havok – vocals
- Jade Puget – guitars
- Hunter Burgan – bass
- Adam Carson – drums

Production

- Jade Puget – production
- Tony Hoffer – mixing
- Vlado Meller – mastering

== Charts ==
Chart performance for Bodies
Chart (2021)	Peak position
UK Album Downloads (OCC)	29
UK Rock & Metal Albums (OCC)	12
US Independent Albums (Billboard)	36
US Top Album Sales (Billboard)	33
