= 17 Crimes =

Single by AFI

from the album Burials
- Released: August 16, 2013
- Recorded: 2012–13
- Genre: Gothic rock • pop punk • alternative rock
- Length: 2:57
- Label: Republic
- Songwriters: Hunter Burgan, Adam Carson, Davey Havok, Jade Puget

AFI singles chronology
"I Hope You Suffer" (2013)	"17 Crimes" (2013)	"The Conductor" (2013)

"17 Crimes" is a song by American rock band AFI. It was released as the second single from their ninth studio album Burials in 2013. It peaked at number 25 on the US Alternative Songs chart.

== Track listing ==
All tracks are written by AFI.

No.	Title	Length
1.	"17 Crimes"	2:57
Total length:		2:57

== Chart positions ==
Chart (2013)	Peak position
US Alternative Airplay (Billboard)	25
US Rock & Alternative Airplay (Billboard)	49
