= The Missing Man =

2018 EP by AFI

EP by AFI
- Released: December 7, 2018
- Recorded: Summer 2018
- Genre: Punk rock; new wave; emo
- Length: 15:28
- Label: Ex Noctem Nacimur

AFI chronology
AFI (2017)	The Missing Man (2018)	Bodies (2021)

Singles from The Missing Man
- 1. "Get Dark" Released: October 26, 2018

The Missing Man is an extended play by American rock band AFI. The EP was released on December 7, 2018. It is the first EP by AFI since 336 EP/Now the World Picture Disk, which was released in 2002.

The EP was released through Ex Noctem Nacimur. On October 26, 2018, the single "Get Dark" was released as well as information about the EP.

== Background and release ==
On October 25, 2018, all photos of AFI frontman Davey Havok were removed from the band's Instagram page and a new press photo was released with Havok missing; only a silhouette was present, sparking rumors he had left AFI. This rumor turned out to be false. The next day, the band surprise-released a new single called "Get Dark" on Spotify and iTunes. The Missing Man was released on December 7, 2018.

== Critical reception ==
Professional ratings
Review scores
Source	Rating
AllMusic	4/5 stars
Exclaim!	6/10

Wall of Sound rated The Missing Man 7.5/10, stating: "Taking away everything we know about the band in the past, this new release showcases a very talented band, capable of playing a whole range of different styles they have yet been able to hone in [sic] on." The review also mentions that the EP features a range of different musical styles the band had not yet explored. In a positive review, AllMusic said the album "serves as a sonic "greatest hits," tapping into the various styles that the band favored during the 2010s." Exclaim!, in a mixed review, criticized the album as "Hot Topic dad rock".

== Track listing ==
All lyrics are written by Davey Havok; all music is composed by Jade Puget.

No.	Title	Length
1.	"Trash Bat"	2:08
2.	"Break Angels"	3:27
3.	"Back Into the Sun"	3:01
4.	"Get Dark"	2:41
5.	"The Missing Man"	4:15
