= Crash Love =

Studio album by AFI
- Released: September 29, 2009
- Studio: Conway, Sunset, The Steakhouse, and Henson, Hollywood, Los Angeles, California
- Genre: Alternative rock; pop rock
- Length: 43:08
- Label: DGC, Interscope
- Producer: Joe McGrath; Jacknife Lee; AFI

AFI chronology
| Decemberunderground (2006) | Crash Love (2009) | Burials (2013) |

Singles from Crash Love
- 1. "Medicate" Released: August 25, 2009; 2. "Beautiful Thieves" Released: December 1, 2009

Crash Love is the eighth studio album by the rock band AFI. Produced by Joe McGrath and Jacknife Lee, it was released on September 29, 2009, through Interscope Records.

== Background and recording ==
Following the touring cycle for 2006's Decemberunderground, AFI spent two years writing and recording their next album while also working on a number of side projects: bassist Hunter Burgan started Hunter Revenge and briefly reunited with his old band The Force, while singer Davey Havok and guitarist Jade Puget recorded and performed as the electronic act Blaqk Audio. Havok also launched a fashion line while Puget worked on remixing and production for other musical artists. In November 2008, AFI announced that they had finished writing their next album and would be recording it with producer David Bottrill.

The following month the band's official website was redesigned and relaunched, and a contest entitled "Begin Transmission" was announced in which fans were invited to submit homemade videos to be considered for a spot to record backing vocals on the album. Thousands of entries were received and personally reviewed by the band members, and the five winners recorded their parts with the band at Conway Studios in Los Angeles in February 2009. In January 2009 AFI split with Bottrill in favor of producers Joe McGrath (who had worked with Morrissey, Alkaline Trio, and Blink-182) and Jacknife Lee. However, they continued working on the same songs and did not abandon any of the material that had already been recorded.

== Release and promotion ==
The album's title was announced as Crash Love in February 2009, and in July its release date was set as September 29. A viral marketing campaign was used to reveal the album's tracks, with songs announced one-by-one on the band's website as fans sent messages to a Twitter account. The full track listing and album art were reported by various music publications on August 21. In announcing the completion of Crash Love, Havok stated that "personally, I've never been more proud of an AFI record" and called it "the album by which we'll be remembered." The band later noted that, compared to the success of Decemberunderground, much of the general public seemed unaware of the release of Crash Love, marking the first time an AFI album had not made at least as big an impact as their previous effort. They appeared at the Reading and Leeds Festivals in the UK in August 2009. The album's first single, "Medicate", became available for purchase through iTunes on August 25, 2009, was released to radio stations September 1, and is included as a playable track in the video game Guitar Hero 5. The band previewed the album on their MySpace page for two days starting September 22, a week ahead of its official release.

Deluxe CD and digital download editions of Crash Love include a number of b-side and demo tracks as additional content. The album debuted at number 12 on the Billboard 200, selling 52,000 copies in the US in its first week. A special edition release features the album cover art in black. In November and December 2009, the band went on a North American tour with Gallows, who later dropped off and were replaced by Dave Hause of the Loved Ones and Jonny Craig of Emarosa. They ended the year with an appearance at the KROQ Almost Acoustic Christmas festival. From December 2009, the band hosted a web series on Buzznet that detailed the majoing of the album. AFI went on another North American tour in January 2010, with main support from Ceremony, and Wolves and Thieves and Viva Hate appearing on select dates. On February 4, 2010, a music video was released for "Beautiful Thieves". Following this, they toured Australia as part of the Soundwave festival and then went on a short Southeast US tour with support from the Loved Ones and Scarlet Grey. In April 2010, the band went on a UK tour with Sick of It All and the Dear & Departed, leading up to an appearance at the Groezrock festival in Belgium. They played a handful of Midwest shows with Scarlet Grey. In August 2010, the band went on a US tour with Green Day and appeared at Lollapalooza.

== Critical reception ==
Professional ratings
Aggregate scores
| Source | Rating |
|---|---|
| Metacritic | 70/100 |
Review scores
| Source | Rating |
| AllMusic | 4/5 stars |
| Alternative Press | 4.5/5 |
| The A.V. Club | C− |
| Drowned in Sound | 3/10 |
| Los Angeles Times | 3.5/4 stars |
| The Phoenix | 4/5 stars |
| Rolling Stone | 3/5 stars |
| Spin | 3/5 stars |
| Sputnikmusic | 4/5 stars |

Critical response to Crash Love was generally favorable, with most critics praising its intricacy and musicianship as well as the band's stylistic growth. The review aggregator Metacritic scores the album at 70 out of 100, based on 12 reviews. Matt Collar of Allmusic remarked that the album is "less mannered than its predecessor and reveals a band exploding with a creative power pop and metal spark" and that "Ultimately, AFI have lightened up the band's darkly sexy vibe on Crash Love and delivered a yearning, perfect pop/rock crush of an album." Jason Pettigrew of Alternative Press praised the tight, precise playing of Carson and Burgan, Puget's "sense of the appropriate", Havok's ability to put a face to his vocals, and the detail in the album's arrangements and atmospheres, commenting that it "reveals more treasures with repeated listens" and that "In no uncertain terms, Crash Love is an accomplishment that raises the bar for [AFI] as musicians and writers." Steve Appleford of the Los Angeles Times similarly complimented the album as confident and enjoyable, noting that the band had "grown with accelerating sophistication, stepping further beyond easy pop-punk thrashings to something grander, with music to match the mopey melodrama of Havok's words."

Vik Bansal of MusicOMH praised AFI's ability to keep their sound fresh and different with each album, remarking that "[Crash Love] may be AFI's eighth album but there is no sign of fatigue, waning in quality or the song remaining the same." Dave de Sylvia of Sputnikmusic shared this sentiment, stating that "Crash Love smashes precedent to pieces, but, far from being a regression, it’s the best move they could have made at this stage in their career." He also praised Puget's guitar work and Havok's lyrics, remarking of the latter that "while Crash Love never quite hits the lyrical highs of Sing the Sorrow, it’s earthier and more relatable on a human level." Although he felt that the album occasionally sounds disjointed, with fun uptempo tracks placed next to more subtle ones, he concluded that it was "a more intricate and well-constructed album" than its platinum-selling predecessor Decemberunderground, and "an unexpectedly focused affair". Barry Thomson of The Phoenix called the album "easily A.F.I.'s best since 2003's Sing the Sorrow, and the cheeky pop-punk chorus of 'Too Shy to Scream' is their first successful decree to boogie the night away." Chris Fallon of AbsolutePunk rated the album an 83%, calling "Cold Hands" "painfully cheesy" and "Veronica Sawyer Smokes" "the album's most overwhelming misfire, shifting from massive hooks to a jangly indie-pop mentality", but praised each band member's performance and concluded that the album is "by no means a work of art, but it's a nice step-up from the mildly enjoyable 2006 release Decemberunderground".

Negative criticism of the album centered around its polished sound and weak lyrics. Christian Hoard of Rolling Stone noted that while Crash Love is more streamlined than Decemberunderground, "'streamlined' here means spidery guitars and wailed choruses". He also criticized the "vague concept of a souring relationship" that Havok's lyrics are built around, and remarked that "It can sound like AFI are just writing for their upcoming fall tour: The bombastic 'It Was Mine' could go on Green Day's next disc." Daniel Yates of Drowned in Sound was also highly critical, scoring the album three out of ten and complaining that the band's guitar sound had become increasingly polished over the years and thus lost its effectiveness: "drop-d's lost their weight, palm-mutes were drenched in enough [effects] to make [a] nu metaller blush, and now with the synths apparently ditched, Crash Love sees the culmination of all that disgrace in a collection of sounds that fall somewhere between P.O.D. and a fart that's been trapped in a turbo-fx pedal for ten years." He also criticized Havok's lyrics as "clumsy strings of inchoate metaphors" that fail to evoke true emotion, remarking that "the band that once set Baudelaire to music are going to be keeping the Morrisseyism-shorthand-for-literacy vocal quirk, which permeates [Havok's] contribution to this album."

J. Gabriel Boylan of Spin also criticized the album's polished sound and vocals, stating that "Too often, Puget's fine guitar work can't overcome traces of the band's oompah pop-punk past or lyrics both illogical ('The broken radio was playing suicide') and cliché ('I feel nothing')." He also felt that the band's punk rock roots prevented them from allowing subtlety: "Crash Love never pauses to take a breath or slows the tempo or eases back on the hypercompressed everything. The whole history of gloomy pop is on display, but the band's hardcore background doesn't allow for the more subtle atmospherics of, say, Bauhaus or even the Cramps." Jason Heller of The A.V. Club scored the album a C-, feeling that it was weakened by abandoning Decemberunderground's range of styles and textures in favor of straightforward guitar rock: "The limited palette this time around doesn't do the band any favors: Where the sheer scope and giddy dynamics of Decemberunderground helped cover up some of the group's weak spots–for instance, Havok's histrionic flair and bad Marc Almond impression–Crash Love traffics in more of the same utilitarian riffs and bleating anger-slash-melancholy that AFI made its name on."

== Style ==
"I would really describe this as a rock record, a really straightforward rock record. I don't think we've ever recorded one of those before, we’ve released hardcore records and we've released very multi-layered alt-rock records but this is the most straightforward rock record I think we've ever written so for us that is another matter of progression. Certainly creating a rock record is nothing new in [relation] to the greater world of rock music but for us it's something we've never done before so it's very fresh for us."

— Davey Havok

Crash Love continues AFI's trend of varying their style from one release to the next, with a sound rooted in punk rock but having absorbed and experimented with hardcore punk, gothic rock, and electropop influences on previous albums. Bassist Hunter Burgan described Crash Love as "definitely more of a rock album–more immediate and definitely more of a focused, direct approach musically. Compared to Decemberunderground, where some of the songs were more subtle, these are more in-your-face." Dave de Sylvia of Sputnikmusic speculated that part of the motivation behind Puget and Havok's side project Blaqk Audio was to allow them to expand on the electronic elements that had been prevalent on Decemberunderground while preserving AFI as a primarily pop-punk act. Havok stated that though it was not a purposeful move, the experience with Blaqk Audio did contribute to there being few electronic elements on Crash Love:

Crash Love is a more guitar-focused, guitar-based record than Decemberunderground was. I think what that is a result of is Jade and I having toured for two months and recorded the CexCells record [with Blaqk Audio]. So when we sat down and began writing Crash Love it was refreshing to be playing rock and I think that having done Blaqk Audio, it rejuvenated our interest in rock. Blaqk Audio was already entirely purely electronic but coming from that sitting down and writing rock we just didn't have as much inspiration to insert those electronic [sounds] into the rock music that we were playing. But it wasn’t a conscious thing.

Critics compared Crash Love's sound to Morrissey, the Raspberries, The Cure, The Smiths, U2, New Order, and Alkaline Trio. Some compared Puget's guitar lines to Jimmy Page, Johnny Marr, Trent Reznor, and Black Sabbath. Several critics compared "Too Shy to Scream" to Adam and the Ants, specifically the song "Goody Two-Shoes".

"Medicate"
The album's lead single, "Medicate", demonstrates the more straightforward rock sound AFI pursued on Crash Love, in contrast to the more varied styles of their previous albums.

Of its style, Matt Collar of Allmusic said that the album is "sticky with epic swaths of melodic rock and just enough swaggering goth-itude to please the emo-tweens" and that "Havok's glitter-goth persona is well intact, it seems tempered here with a bit more punkish muscle and '80s pop croon." Jason Pettigrew of Alternative Press felt that the album's style falls somewhere between their punk roots and mainstream rock, fitting neither extreme: "Although the members of AFI can't go home anymore, they're exploring more sonic vistas than any random group of smelly dudes in a van plastered with hardcore stickers or Clear Channel-sanctioned modern-rock dullards kicking back in $8K-a-week coaches, combined." Other reviewers noted elements of gothic rock, post-punk, 1980s pop, hardcore punk, and synthpop in the album. Vik Bansal of MusicOMH remarked that Crash Love "shows that while fusing goth, punk and pop doesn't need to be rocket science, when AFI are involved it's very definitely an artform." Chris Fallon of AbsolutePunk stated that "fans have to understand AFI is no longer that angry, sarcastic punk band anymore -- every member has strengthened their craft to coincide with each individual's influence."

== Track listing ==
All tracks are written by AFI (Davey Havok, Adam Carson, Hunter Burgan, Jade Puget).

Standard edition
| No. | Title | Length |
|---|---|---|
| 1. | "Torch Song" | 3:45 |
| 2. | "Beautiful Thieves" | 3:46 |
| 3. | "End Transmission" | 3:47 |
| 4. | "Too Shy to Scream" | 2:57 |
| 5. | "Veronica Sawyer Smokes" | 2:44 |
| 6. | "Okay, I Feel Better Now" | 4:31 |
| 7. | "Medicate" | 4:20 |
| 8. | "I Am Trying Very Hard to Be Here" | 2:43 |
| 9. | "Sacrilege" | 3:27 |
| 10. | "Darling, I Want to Destroy You" | 3:43 |
| 11. | "Cold Hands" | 3:32 |
| 12. | "It Was Mine" | 3:53 |
| Total length: | | 43:24 |

Japanese bonus tracks
| No. | Title | Length |
|---|---|---|
| 13. | "Carcinogen Crush" (2007 single recorded during the Decemberunderground sessions) | 2:52 |
| 14. | "Ether" (recorded during the Decemberunderground sessions) | 2:36 |
| 15. | "Miss Murder" (duet featuring Kyosuke Himuro) | 3:26 |

iTunes Store edition
| No. | Title | Length |
|---|---|---|
| 13. | "Too Late for Gods" (Crash Love sessions outtake) | 4:02 |
| 14. | "Breathing Towers to Heaven" (demo from Crash Love sessions) | 3:51 |

iTunes Store expanded edition
| No. | Title | Length |
|---|---|---|
| 13. | "Fainting Spells" (Decemberunderground sessions outtake) | 4:02 |
| 14. | "We've Got the Knife" (demo from Crash Love sessions) | 3:52 |
| 15. | "Where We Used to Play" (demo from Crash Love sessions) | 3:58 |
| 16. | "100 Words" (Sing the Sorrow sessions outtake) | 5:17 |
| 17. | "Too Late for Gods" (Crash Love sessions outtake) | 4:02 |
| 18. | "Breathing Towers to Heaven" (demo from Crash Love sessions) | 3:54 |

Deluxe edition bonus disc
| No. | Title | Length |
|---|---|---|
| 1. | "Fainting Spells" (Decemberunderground sessions outtake) | 4:00 |
| 2. | "We've Got the Knife" (demo from Crash Love sessions) | 3:50 |
| 3. | "Where We Used to Play" (demo from Crash Love sessions) | 3:57 |
| 4. | "100 Words" (Sing the Sorrow sessions outtake) | 5:13 |
| Total length: | | 60:08 |

== Personnel ==
=== Band ===
- Davey Havok – lead vocals, backing vocals
- Jade Puget – guitars, backing vocals
- Hunter Burgan – bass, backing vocals
- Adam Carson – drums, backing vocals

=== Backing vocalists ===
- Nick 13, Dan Under, Ben Grey, Luke Wood, Julie Delgado, and Kenna Ramsey – backing vocals
- Christy Vegas, Scott Raymond, Natacia Marriott, Courtney Cavazos, Brock Honma, and Mark Oshiro – backing vocals on "I Am Trying Very Hard to Be Here"

=== Production ===
- Joe McGrath – production, engineering on tracks 1, 2, 4, and 7–12
- Seth Waldmann, Jake Davies, John Silas Cranfield, and Andrew Scheps – engineering on tracks 1, 2, 4, and 7–12
- Morgan Stratton and Bill Mims – assistant engineering on tracks 1, 2, 4, and 7–12
- Jacknife Lee – production on tracks 3–5 and 6
- Tom McFall – engineering on tracks 3–5 and 6
- Kevin Mills – assistant engineering on tracks 3–5 and 6
- Todd Parker – additional engineering on tracks 2, 6, 9, and 10
- German Villacorta – Pro Tools editing
- Rich Costey – mixing engineering
- Charlie Stavish and Noah Goldstein – assistant mixing engineering
- Vlado Meller – mastering
- Mark Santangelo – assistant mastering

=== Artwork ===
- Morning Breath Inc. – art direction and design
- 2 Fake – 3D rendering
- Jason Odell – photography

=== Bonus track production ===
"Fainting Spells"

- Jerry Finn – production, mixing
- Joe McGrath – engineering
- Seth Waldmann, Jason Gossmann, Kevin Mills, Eric Weaver, and Dimitar Krhjaic – assistant engineering
- Ted Jensen – mastering

"We've Got the Knife" and "Where We Used to Play"

- Daniel Sternbaum – engineering
- John Silas Cranfield – engineering, mixing
- Tyler Muelrath and Jun Park – assistant engineering

"100 Words"

- Jerry Finn – production, mixing
- Joe McGrath – engineering
- Chris Holmes, Alan Mason, Dan Chase, Stacey Dodds, and Alan Sanderson – assistant engineering
- Ted Jensen – mastering
- Butch Vig – production
- Jade Puget – executive production

== Chart performance ==
Chart performance for Crash Love
| Chart (2009) | Peak position |
|---|---|
| Australian Albums Chart | 16 |
| Canadian Albums Chart | 17 |
| New Zealand Albums Chart | 38 |
| UK Albums Chart | 73 |
| US Billboard 200 | 12 |
| US Billboard Alternative Albums | 5 |
| US Billboard Hard Rock Albums | 4 |
| US Billboard Rock Albums | 5 |
