= Silver Bleeds the Black Sun... =

Studio album by AFI
- Released: October 3, 2025
- Genre: Post-punk; gothic rock
- Length: 33:57
- Label: Run for Cover
- Producer: Jade Puget

AFI chronology
Bodies (2021)	Silver Bleeds the Black Sun... (2025)

Singles from Silver Bleeds the Black Sun
- 1. "Behind the Clock" Released: August 5, 2025; 2. "Holy Visions" Released: September 9, 2025; 3. "Ash Speck in a Green Eye" Released: September 29, 2025; 4. "Voidward, I Bend Back" Released: December 11, 2025

Silver Bleeds the Black Sun... is the twelfth studio album by American rock band AFI. It was released on October 3, 2025, via Run for Cover in LP, CD and digital formats.

Consisting of ten songs with a total runtime of approximately thirty-four minutes, Silver Bleeds the Black Sun... was preceded by the band's 2021 full-length release, Bodies. "Behind the Clock" was released as the lead single on August 5, 2025, alongside a music video directed by Gilbert Trejo.

== Reception ==
Professional ratings
Aggregate scores
Source	Rating
Metacritic	81/100
Review scores
Source	Rating
AllMusic	4/5 stars
Clash	8/10
Classic Rock	3.5/5 stars
Kerrang	4/5
Louder	4.5/5 stars
musicOMH	4/5 stars
Sputnikmusic	3.5/5

In a four-star review for AllMusic, Neil Z. Yeung noted the style as "leaning into the adult goth-rock and post-punk", referring to the production as "lush", "layered" and "the real standout".

Giving it a rating of eight, Clash's Paulina Subia noted, the album "beautifully captures the continuous draw towards the Gothic: a sheer elation at the exorcism of one's inner demons." James Hickie of Kerrang! remarked, "What makes Silver Bleeds the Black Sun… work is the confidence with which AFI have gone all in, slipping the bonds of expectation once and for all and cutting loose," giving it a rating of four.

In a review for Louder, Stephen Hill referred to it as "their finest album in over a decade. Even by AFI's standards, this is none more goth." Sowing of Sputnikmusic assigned it a rating of 3.5, stating "The blackened, angry-at-the-world post-punk delivered through a theatrical, 80s-tinged lens aesthetic is absolutely perfect for them at this stage of their careers."

== Track listing ==
All tracks are written by Hunter Burgan, Adam Carson, Davey Havok, and Jade Puget.

Silver Bleeds the Black Sun... track listing
No.	Title	Length
1.	"The Bird of Prey"	3:08
2.	"Behind the Clock"	3:57
3.	"Holy Visions"	3:30
4.	"Blasphemy & Excess"	3:04
5.	"Spear of Truth"	4:11
6.	"Ash Speck in a Green Eye"	3:18
7.	"Voidward, I Bend Back"	2:28
8.	"Marguerite"	3:04
9.	"A World Unmade"	4:01
10.	"Nooneunderground"	3:16
Total length:		33:57

== Personnel ==
Credits adapted from Tidal.

=== AFI ===
- Hunter Burgan – bass, bass engineering
- Adam Carson – drums
- Davey Havok – vocals, art direction
- Jade Puget – guitar, production, engineering, recording

=== Additional contributors ===
- Tony Hoffer – mixing
- Vlado Meller – mastering
- Cameron Lister – drum engineering
- Mike Fasano – drum technician
- Jeremy Lubser – mastering assistance
- Don Phury – design, illustrations

== Charts ==
Chart performance for Silver Bleeds the Black Sun...
Chart (2025)	Peak position
Australian Albums (ARIA)	57
Scottish Albums (OCC)	67
UK Album Downloads (OCC)	23
UK Albums Sales (OCC)	39
UK Independent Albums (OCC)	14
US Billboard 200	110
US Independent Albums (Billboard)	15
US Top Rock & Alternative Albums (Billboard)	27
