= Beautiful Thieves =

Single by AFI

from the album Crash Love
- Released: December 1, 2009
- Recorded: 2009
- Genre: Alternative rock
- Length: 3:46
- Label: Interscope
- Songwriter(s): Hunter Burgan, Adam Carson, David Paden Marchand, Jade Puget
- Producer(s): Joe McGrath

AFI singles chronology
"Medicate" (2009)	"Beautiful Thieves" (2009)	"I Hope You Suffer" (2013)

"Beautiful Thieves" is a song by American rock band AFI. It was released as a single from their eighth studio album Crash Love and was released to radio on December 1, 2009. It peaked at #23 on the Alternative Songs chart and #48 on the Rock Songs chart.

== Music video ==
The music video for "Beautiful Thieves" was directed by Travis Kopach and it premiered on February 4, 2010. The video was filmed on December 16, 2009 at a mansion in Simi Valley, California. It features scenes of the band performing, as well as a storyline that "shows people being forced to be responsible for their actions; we implement that retribution, if you will," according to Havok.

== Charts ==
Chart	Peak position
U.S. Alternative Songs	23
U.S. Rock Songs	48
