= Looking Tragic / Begging for Trouble =

Single by AFI

from the album Bodies
- Released: February 25, 2021
- Length: 2:37 ("Looking Tragic"); 2:20 ("Begging for Trouble"); 4:57 (both songs combined)
- Label: Rise
- Songwriters: Adam Carson; Davey Havok; Hunter Burgan; Jade Puget
- Producer: Jade Puget

AFI singles chronology
"Twisted Tongues / Escape from Los Angeles" (2021)	"Looking Tragic / Begging for Trouble" (2021)	"Dulcería / Far Too Near" (2021)

"Looking Tragic" and "Begging for Trouble" are two songs released as a joint single by American rock band AFI. The songs were released on February 25, 2021, as the second joint single for the band's 11th album, Bodies.

== Background ==
AFI guitarist, Jade Puget, revealed that the band had completed writing Bodies in April 2020, but that they had chosen to push back the release due to the COVID-19 pandemic. Shortly after its release, the band detailed the meaning of "Looking Tragic" on their Twitter account with a quote from the band's frontman, Davey Havok:

"Looking Tragic" addresses the theme of overstimulation resulting in desensitization. Melodic and driving, the song came to life quickly and immediately stood out as a track to make bodies, if not sentiments, move.

Additionally, drummer, Adam Carson, gave details on the writing process for "Begging for Trouble":

After years of receiving early versions of songs from Jade and Davey, in forms that span loosely arranged chords and scratch vocal to fully realised demos, I think I have become quite adept at knowing which songs will or will not make the record. "Begging for Trouble" was greenlit, at least in my mind, the moment I heard the vocals come in. To me, the track is a cornerstone of the new record.

== Release and reception ==
AFI began to tease new music the day before the single came out. The single was announced alongside both the release date for Bodies, and a new music video for "Looking Tragic". The video shows the band playing the song in a vibrantly colored room while continuously being covered in multicolored streamers.

== Track listing ==
- Digital download
1. "Looking Tragic" – 2:37
2. "Begging for Trouble" – 2:20

== Personnel ==
AFI

- Davey Havok – vocals, songwriting
- Jade Puget – guitar, songwriting, producer
- Hunter Burgan – bass guitar, songwriting
- Adam Carson – drums, songwriting

Production

- Jeremy Lubsey – assistant mastering
- Mike Fasano – instrument technician
- Paul Fig – mixing
- Tony Hoffer – mixing
- Vlado Meller – mixing
