= I Hope You Suffer =

Single by AFI

from the album Burials
- Released: July 18, 2013
- Recorded: November 2012–February 2013
- Genre: Alternative rock; gothic rock; post-punk; dark wave
- Length: 4:38
- Label: Republic
- Songwriters: Davey Havok; Jade Puget

AFI singles chronology
"Beautiful Thieves" (2009)	"I Hope You Suffer" (2013)	"17 Crimes" (2013)

"I Hope You Suffer" is a song by American rock band AFI. It was released as the lead single from their ninth studio album Burials in 2013.

== Background ==
The three-and-a-half-year gap between "I Hope You Suffer", and their single "Beautiful Thieves" marked the longest gap between new material in the band's existence.

During his time with Progress Wrestling, professional wrestler Jimmy Havoc used the song as his entrance music.

== Composition ==
Guitarist Jade Puget spoke with Loudwire about the song. "You can tell when listen to the song," he said. "I mean it’s not as apparent now, but the chorus is very like a rock chorus -- big guitars, drums, and the verse is all layers likes cinematic percussion and the piano and the brass ... The two parts are kind of disparate, but now they work together very well and I think that dynamic is what makes that song."

== Chart performance ==
"I Hope You Suffer" peaked at number 40 on the US Hot Rock Songs chart and 30 on the Hot Rock Digital Songs.

== Music video ==
The music video for the track was released on July 30, 2013 on the band's YouTube and Vevo pages. The video was directed by directing duo Brad Palmer and Brian Palmer for Surround. The video concept was an extension of the bands teaser promo videos that where also directed and created by Brad and Brian Palmer.

== Track listing ==
All tracks are written by Davey Havok and Jade Puget.

No.	Title	Length
1.	"I Hope You Suffer"	4:38
Total length:		4:38

== Chart positions ==
Chart (2013)	Peak position
US Hot Rock & Alternative Songs (Billboard)	40
US Hot Rock Digital Songs (Billboard)	30
