= Decemberunderground =

Studio album by AFI
- Released: June 6, 2006
- Studios: Conway Recording, Los Angeles, California; Sage & Sound Recording, Los Angeles, California
- Genres: Post-hardcore; alternative rock; emo
- Length: 45:06
- Label: Interscope
- Producer: Jerry Finn

AFI chronology
Sing the Sorrow (2003)	Decemberunderground (2006)	Crash Love (2009)

Singles from Decemberunderground
- 1. "Miss Murder" Released: April 3, 2006; 2. "Love Like Winter" Released: September 26, 2006; 3. "The Missing Frame" Released: February 27, 2007

Decemberunderground (stylized in all caps) is the seventh studio album by American rock band AFI, released on June 6, 2006, through Interscope Records. The album was supported by three singles, "Miss Murder", "Love Like Winter", and "The Missing Frame".

== Recording ==
Over 120 songs were written for the album, the majority of them never finished or released.

Recording took place at Conway Recording Studios and Sage & Sound Recording Studios in Los Angeles, California. Sessions were produced by Jerry Finn with Joe McGrath handling recording. They were assisted by engineers Seth Waldmann, Jason Gossman, Kevin Mills, Eric Weaver, Dimitar Krnjaic and Keith Armstrong. In addition to Puget's programming and keyboards, Ronan Harris of VNV Nation and Dave McCracken contributed additional programming and keyboards. Finn and Chris Lord-Alge mixed the recordings at Conway Studios and Resonate Music. Ted Jensen mastered the recordings at Sterling Sound in New York City.

== Music and lyrics ==
Mainly described as a post-hardcore, alternative rock and emo album, Decemberunderground also contains a variety of genre elements, including EDM, new wave, gothic rock, hardcore punk, synthwave and synthpop. Some consider it to be a "scene album".

Ed Thompson of IGN compared the album to bands such as U2, the Cure, the Smiths, Depeche Mode and Alphaville. Alternative Press compared the album to 1980s synthwave music.

Regarding the album's title, lead singer Davey Havok said, "Decemberunderground is a time and a place. It is where the cold can huddle together in darkness and isolation." The album's title is sung in a lyric in the song "The Interview".

== Release ==
In late March 2006, the upcoming album was promoted by a cryptic contest known as "The Charlotte Mystery" that culminated in fans who solved the puzzles being invited to April 2006 private shows in Los Angeles, New York City, and San Francisco. Alongside this, the album's title was revealed, and was planned for release in three months' time. The album's lead single, "Miss Murder", was released to radio on April 24, 2006. The following day, the artwork and track listing for the album was posted online. The music video for "Miss Murder" premiered through MTV's Overdrive program on May 9, 2006. On May 24, 2006, a 10" picture disc was released featuring "Rabbits are Roadkill on Rt. 37" as the B-side.

In May 2006, they appeared at The Bamboozle and HFStival. Leading up to the album's release, listening parties were held across Canada and the US. Decemberunderground was made available for streaming on May 30, 2006, before being released on June 6, 2006. The iTunes version included "On the Arrow" and a cover of the Morrissey song "Jack the Ripper" (1992) as bonus tracks. Customers who pre-ordered the album at special pre-listening events received a CD of the "Miss Murder" single, which also contained a cover of INXS's song "Don't Change". The first pressing of the CD in the United States contained a limited edition insert with one of four band member portraits.

On June 8, 2006, the band appeared on the MTV Movie Awards, where they performed "Miss Murder". Between June and August 2006, the band appeared at select stops on the 2006 Warped Tour and played various headlining shows, with support from the Dillinger Escape Plan and Nightmare of You. Darker My Love supported the last few dates of the tour. In September 2006, the band appeared at the Bumbershoot festival, and went on a brief West Coast US tour with support from Tiger Army. "Love Like Winter" was released to radio on September 25, 2006; the song's music video was posted online two days later. Following this, the band played three shows in Germany, before embarking on a UK tour in October 2006, where they were supported by the Explosion and Dispute.

The album was re-released on November 7, 2006, on 6 "icy clear" 7-inch vinyl. The individual record sleeves featured band member portraits, as well as a portrait of the band's tour manager Smith Puget. That same month, they played three US shows with the Explosion and the Loved Ones that led into a short tour of New Zealand and Australia. They closed out the year headlining the 91X Nightmare Before Xmas radio festival, and playing an AOL Session, where they performed "Endlessly, She Said". On December 12, 2006, the band released the video album I Heard a Voice – Live from Long Beach Arena, which was filmed at Long Beach Arena earlier in the year.

In February 2007, they played a few East Coast shows with Sick of It All, which was followed by a few West Coast shows in the next month with Viva Hate and Love Equals Death. Preceded by one-off show in Mexico, AFI then went on a tour of Europe in April and May 2007, and appeared at Virgin Festival in Canada. AFI held their last concert in promotion of the album at Download Fest in October 2007. Havok and Puget then began to promote their side-project Blaqk Audio before beginning work on the eighth AFI album, Crash Love (2009).

== Reception ==
Professional ratings
Aggregate scores
Source	Rating
Metacritic	72/100
Review scores
Source	Rating
AllMusic	4/5 stars
Blender	5/5 stars
Entertainment Weekly	B+
Exclaim!	(favorable)
IGN	8.5/10
NME	6/10 stars
Robert Christgau	C+
Rolling Stone	3/5 stars
Stylus	C+
Slant Magazine	4/5 stars
Alternative Press	4.5/5 stars
Punknews.org	4/5 stars

=== Critical response ===
Decemberunderground received generally positive reviews. The review aggregator Metacritic awarded the album a 72 out of 100, based on 15 reviews.

Entertainment Weekly awarded the album a grade of B+, and called it a further development of the band's earlier shift to "an eerie, metal-edged Cure sound", with Decemberunderground representing "the most melodically acute distillation of that style yet," unlike their previous studio album Sing the Sorrow, which they awarded a D. AllMusic awarded the album 4 out of 5 stars, saying the band's "ever-evolving goth-punk" sound is present on Decemberunderground in a "tighter and lighter" form, showing that the "core of AFI's sound never strays too far from what listeners have grown to love about them in the first place."

Rolling Stone awarded the album 3 out of 5 stars, one less star than their review of Sing the Sorrow, and claimed that "something isn't right in the world of AFI," because of their pop-rock musical structure "that would be at home on the soundtrack to the next Spider-Man movie".

=== Commercial performance and accolades ===
It debuted at number one on the Billboard 200, selling 182,000 copies in its first week of being released. The album was certified gold by the Recording Industry Association of America (RIAA) on August 30, 2006, and has sold at least 993,000 copies in the United States as of September 2009. The album was eligible for platinum certification in 2007 and received it from the RIAA in 2013.

Cleveland.com ranked "Miss Murder" at number 45 on their list of the top 100 pop-punk songs. Alternative Press ranked "Miss Murder" at number 30 on their list of the best 100 singles from the 2000s.

== Track listing ==
All tracks are written by AFI (Davey Havok, Adam Carson, Hunter Burgan, Jade Puget), except where noted.

Standard edition
No.	Title	Length
0.	Untitled (pregap hidden track; CD exclusive)	0:20
1.	"Prelude 12/21"	1:34
2.	"Kill Caustic"	2:39
3.	"Miss Murder"	3:26
4.	"Summer Shudder"	3:06
5.	"The Interview"	4:16
6.	"Love Like Winter"	2:45
7.	"Affliction"	5:28
8.	"The Missing Frame"	4:40
9.	"Kiss and Control"	4:18
10.	"The Killing Lights"	4:04
11.	"37mm"	3:55
12.	"Endlessly, She Said"	4:26
Total length:		45:06

7-inch vinyl box set bonus track
No.	Title	Length
13.	"Fallen Like the Sky"	3:22

International bonus track
No.	Title	Length
13.	"Rabbits Are Roadkill on Rt. 37"	3:51

UK bonus tracks
No.	Title	Writer(s)	Length
13.	"Rabbits Are Roadkill on Rt. 37"		3:51
14.	"Head Like a Hole"	Trent Reznor	4:44

Japanese bonus tracks
No.	Title	Writer(s)	Length
13.	"Rabbits Are Roadkill on Rt. 37"		3:51
14.	"Head Like a Hole"	Trent Reznor	4:44
15.	"Don't Change"	INXS	3:16

Japanese bonus DVD
No.	Title	Length
1.	"Miss Murder" (video)	5:12
2.	"Love Like Winter" (video)	2:56
3.	"Silver & Cold" (video)	4:11
4.	"The Leaving Song Pt.II" (video)	3:36
5.	"Love Like Winter" (live at Long Beach Arena, '06/9/15)	3:26
6.	"EPK"	16:15
Total length:		35:37

iTunes bonus tracks
No.	Title	Writer(s)	Length
13.	"On the Arrow"		3:06
14.	"Jack the Ripper" (pre-order only)	Morrissey; Boorer	2:48
15.	"Interactive Booklet"

Target bonus track
No.	Title	Length
15.	"Fallen Like the Sky" (bonus downloadable track)	3:22

== Personnel ==
Credits for Decemberunderground adapted from the album liner notes.

AFI

- Davey Havok – lead vocals
- Jade Puget – guitars, programming, keyboards, co-lead vocals on "The Interview"
- Hunter Burgan – bass, additional programming, keyboards
- Adam Carson – drums

Additional musicians

- Ronan Harris – additional programming, keyboards
- Dave McCracken – additional programming, keyboards
- Nick 13 – additional background vocals
- Dan Under – additional background vocals
- Ralph Saenz – additional background vocals
- Jacquelyn Simley – additional background vocals
- Nikishia Grier – additional background vocals
- Ryan Wilson – additional background vocals
- Wedge – additional background vocals
- Jerry Finn – additional background vocals
- Joe McGrath – additional background vocals
- Brandan Schieppati – additional background vocals
- Keith Barney – additional background vocals
- "Precious" Steve Cunningham – additional background vocals
- Ryan J. Downey – additional background vocals
- Jeff Sagud – additional background vocals
- Gavin Rattmann – additional background vocals
- Luke Wood – additional background vocals
- The Despair Faction – additional background vocals

Production

- Jerry Finn – production, mixing
- Chris Lord-Alge – mixing (tracks 3, 4, 6–8 and 10)
- Joe McGrath – recording
- Seth Waldmann – assistant engineering
- Jason Gossman – assistant engineering
- Kevin Mills – assistant engineering
- Eric Weaver – assistant engineering
- Dimitar Krnjaic – assistant engineering
- Keith Armstrong – assistant engineering
- Ted Jensen – mastering
- Morning Breath Inc. – art direction, design
- Alan Forbes – illustration
- James Minchin – photography

== Bonus tracks and outtakes ==
All tracks recorded during the Decemberunderground sessions unless otherwise noted.

- "Rabbits are Roadkill on Rt. 37" was recorded during the Sing the Sorrow sessions, and was eventually released on the MySpace Records: Volume 1 compilation and as a bonus track on international editions of Decemberunderground.
- "On the Arrow" was available as a bonus track on the iTunes pre-ordered edition and the Australian edition of the "Love Like Winter" single.
- "Fainting Spells" was recorded during the Decemberunderground sessions, and was eventually released on the deluxe edition of Crash Love.
- "Fallen Like the Sky" was available as a Target bonus track download and available on the 7" vinyl disc box set edition of Decemberunderground. It was also later made available as a standalone digital single.
- "Wolf and the Lamb" was recorded during the Decemberunderground session; however, it remained unreleased until the 20th anniversary, where it was included as a bonus track.
- "Jack the Ripper" is a Morrissey cover and was available as a bonus track on the iTunes pre-ordered edition and the UK and Australian editions of the "Love Like Winter" single.
- "Head Like a Hole" is a Nine Inch Nails cover and was included on the video game Grand Theft Auto: San Andreas soundtrack. It was re-released on the UK, Australian, German, and Japanese editions of Decemberunderground.
- "Don't Change" is an INXS cover and was released on the "Miss Murder" 7" vinyl disc and the Japanese edition of Decemberunderground.
- Four tracks from the sessions, in addition to "100 Words" from the Sing the Sorrow sessions, were planned to be released on an extended play, originally planned for December 2007, but which never materialized.
  - "Carcinogen Crush", written by Burgan, was first recorded during the Sing the Sorrow sessions, but this version was not released. It was re-recorded during the Decemberunderground sessions and released as a downloadable track on the video game Guitar Hero III: Legends of Rock (2007). It was also made available as a digital single on iTunes on December 4, 2007, charting on two Canadian singles charts. It was later re-released on the Japanese edition of Crash Love and that album's "Medicate" single in the UK.
  - "Ether" was included in NASCAR 09's in-game soundtrack as well as on the Japanese edition of Crash Love.
  - "The View from Here" leaked online in 2016.

== Charts ==
=== Weekly charts ===
Weekly chart performance for Decemberunderground
Chart (2006)	Peak position
Australian Albums (ARIA)	3
Canadian Albums (Billboard)	2
French Albums (SNEP)	181
German Albums (Offizielle Top 100)	58
New Zealand Albums (RMNZ)	20
Irish Albums (IRMA)	66
UK Albums (Official Charts)	16
UK Rock & Metal Albums (Official Charts)	2
US Billboard 200	1
US Top Rock Albums (Billboard)	1

=== Year-end charts ===
Year-end chart performance for Decemberunderground
Chart (2006)	Position
US Billboard 200	77
US Top Rock Albums (Billboard)	16

== Certifications ==
Certifications for Decemberunderground
Region	Certification	Certified units/sales
Australia (ARIA)	Platinum	70,000^{^}
Canada (Music Canada)	Platinum	100,000^{‡}
United Kingdom (BPI)	Silver	60,000^{‡}
United States (RIAA)	Platinum	1,000,000^{^}
^{^} Shipments figures based on certification alone.^{‡} Sales+streaming figures based on certification alone.
