= Fly in the Ointment (EP) =

EP by AFI
- Released: March 31, 1995
- Studio: Art of Ears, Hayward, CA
- Genre: Hardcore punk
- Length: 5:25
- Label: Wedge
- Producer: AFI

AFI chronology
This Is Berkeley, Not West Bay (1994)	Fly in the Ointment (1995)	Answer That and Stay Fashionable (1995)

Fly in the Ointment is the third extended play released by AFI. It was released on the March 31, 1995, on Wedge Records. Tracks 1–3 were re-recorded for Very Proud of Ya, and "Open Your Eyes" is on the re-release of Answer That and Stay Fashionable but with different vocal tracks and mix.

In 2015, for the 20th anniversary, Wedge Records reissued the EP. The reissue featured altered artwork, meant to be viewed through 3D glasses.

== Track listing ==
All lyrics are written by Davey Havok; all music is composed by Geoff Kresge, except where noted.

Side one
No.	Title	Music	Length
1.	"Theory of Revolution"		1:24
2.	"Crop Tub"	Mark Stopholese	1:48

Side two
No.	Title	Lyrics	Music	Length
1.	"Cruise Control"			1:09
2.	"Open Your Eyes" (The Circus Tents cover)	Matt Wedgley	The Circus Tents	1:13

== Personnel ==
Credits adapted from liner notes.

- AFI – producer
- Murray Bowles – back cover, individual photos
- Adam Carson – drums
- Andy Ernst – engineer
- Davey Havok – vocals
- Geoff Kresge – bass, 3-D realization (2015)
- March – guitar
- Eric Reed – cover art
- Matt Wedgley – alternating lead vocals (track: B2; reissue)
- Steve Ziegler – photography

Studios

- Recorded at Art of Ears, Hayward, CA

== Release history ==
Region	Date	Format	Variants	Edition	Label	Catalogue
United States	March 31, 1995	7-inch vinyl	glow in the dark; yellow; black	1000 copies each	Wedge	MW-12495
United States	March 31, 2015	7-inch vinyl	blue / red split	570 copies	Wedge	—N/a
United States	October 31, 2015	7-inch vinyl	black	31 copies	Wedge	—N/a
United States	March 31, 2016	7-inch vinyl	splatter	200 copies	Wedge	—N/a

== See also ==
- Fly in the ointment (traditional saying)
