= The Missing Frame =

Single by AFI

from the album Decemberunderground
- Released: February 27, 2007
- Genre: Emo; post-hardcore; alternative rock
- Length: 4:40
- Label: Interscope
- Songwriters: Hunter Burgan; Adam Carson; David Paden Marchand; Jade Puget
- Producer: Jerry Finn

AFI singles chronology
"Love Like Winter" (2006)	"The Missing Frame" (2007)	"Carcinogen Crush" (2008)

"The Missing Frame" is a song by American rock band AFI. It was released as the third single from their seventh studio album Decemberunderground, impacting radio on February 27, 2007. The song peaked at number 17 on the Alternative Songs chart.

In an interview with Kerrang! magazine, Davey Havok noted that this was the only song on the album that has 'whoa's on it (seeming to forget the 'whoa's on "Prelude 12/21" and "Miss Murder"), also noting the lack of 'whoa's on their 2003 album, Sing the Sorrow.

Havok describes the song as proto-punk as well as saying that the song has "some definite U2 moments to it".

== Music video ==
A music video was confirmed to be released in March 2007 by guitarist Jade Puget. However, in early June vocalist Davey Havok said that there was never a music video on the 'Ask AFI' section of the Official AFI Message Board.

== Charts ==
Chart (2007)	Peak position
Billboard Alternative Songs	17
