= Medicate =

2009 single by AFI

Single by AFI

from the album Crash Love
- Released: August 25, 2009
- Recorded: 2009
- Genre: Alternative rock
- Length: 4:22
- Label: Interscope
- Songwriters: Havok, Puget, Carson, Burgan
- Producer: Joe McGrath

AFI singles chronology
"Carcinogen Crush" (2007)	"Medicate" (2009)	"Beautiful Thieves" (2009)

Audio sample
- A sample of the pre-chorus, chorus, and main riff of the song.: file; help

"Medicate" is a song by the American rock band AFI, released as the first single from their 2009 album Crash Love. It was released as a music download through iTunes on August 25, 2009, and made its radio airplay premiere on September 1. It reached #7 on Billboard's Alternative Songs chart and #16 on the Rock Songs chart. As part of its promotion the song was included as a playable track in the video games Guitar Hero 5 and Tap Tap Revenge 3, and added as downloadable content to the Rock Band music store.

== Music video ==
The music video for "Medicate" was directed by Paul Minor and premiered October 2, 2009. The video is shot in black and white, with gold color effects added digitally. The video depicts the band performing the song in front of a large projection screen which shows footage of a blonde girl and of the band. During the song's bridge, singer Davey Havok kisses the girl while guitarist Jade Puget lies bleeding on the floor, his blood colored gold through the use of digital effects. This style is very similar to conception of Paco Rabanne's and Fendi advertisements.

== Chart positions ==
Chart	Peak position
U.S. Alternative Songs	7
U.S. Rock Songs	16
