= Miss Murder =

Single by AFI

from the album Decemberunderground
- Released: April 3, 2006
- Recorded: 2005
- Genre: Post-hardcore; pop-punk; emo; gothic rock
- Length: 3:26 (album version); 3:05 (top 40 edit); 3:18 (edit)
- Label: Interscope
- Songwriters: David Paden Marchand; Jade Puget; Adam Carson; Hunter Burgan
- Producer: Jerry Finn

AFI singles chronology
"Silver and Cold" (2003)	"Miss Murder" (2006)	"Love Like Winter" (2006)

"Miss Murder" is a song by American rock band AFI. It was released on April 3, 2006, as the lead single from their seventh studio album Decemberunderground. It was initially scheduled to premiere on LIVE 105 on April 13, 2006; however, it was released early due to overwhelming fan reaction. "Miss Murder" was released to radio on April 25, 2006. It was released in the United Kingdom and Australia on April 24 and July 29, 2006. It was written by Davey Havok and produced by Jerry Finn.

The song received favorable reviews from music critics, who complimented its musicianship. It is the band's most commercially successful single to date, reaching number 24 on the Billboard Hot 100 and topping the Alternative Songs chart. Internationally, the song was a moderate success, charting within the United Kingdom, Australia and Germany. It won in the category Best Rock Song at the 2006 MTV Video Music Awards and was nominated for the Kerrang! Award for Best Single. An accompanying music video was directed by Marc Webb (who has previously directed videos for AFI) and premiered on television shortly after the single's release.

== Composition ==
The song originated with guitarist Jade Puget playing a bass hook on his guitar and vocalist Davey Havok coming up with the "Miss Murder" lyric as a throwaway line which ended up sticking. Havok told Kerrang: "We beat this song down. We reworked the chorus over and over again, and in some abyss I sang the melody of the chorus with a scratched lyric that went, 'Hey, miss murder, can I?'" Havok was skeptical of the unconventional hook, but Interscope insisted it should stay as it was. Havok later revealed that he wanted to exclude the song from Decemberunderground, opining that the unreleased "The View from Here" is a better song. He has since fought to exclude the song from set lists for the band's live performances. He said in 2026 that he never thought "it was the greatest song" and that it "breaks [his] heart" that AFI will always be best remembered for "Miss Murder."

There have been several popular theories as to the meaning of the song. These include Satan's fall from grace, Jesus abandoning humanity, Oscar Wilde's 1890 novel The Picture of Dorian Gray (in which Gray sells his soul to preserve his beauty), or Havok's personal struggle with fame. Havok long refused to confirm or deny any rumors: "I don't necessarily need for people to understand specifically what it means. If they want to take something from it and use it in a personal way, I think that's great. I wouldn’t want to risk destroying that just so someone can get a better understanding of me personally."

However, in September of 2025, Havok would disclose during an interview with HardLore that the song is a metaphor for suicide, stating, "That [Miss Murder] was a number one hit that poses the gentle question, 'Should I just kill myself?' Probably. And if I don't, is shit just going to get worse?"

== Music video ==
A music video directed by Marc Webb for the song premiered on television shortly after the track's release. It was filmed at Los Angeles City Hall.

The music video opens with Davey Havok finding a note, possibly written by Miss Murder. The note features the three black rabbits symbol featured on the cover of Decemberunderground. Havok appears at his desk singing the song, while the band members are shown performing the song in a large room. Havok then appears on a balcony, rallying a chanting crowd below, and unfolds large posters of the band members themselves. During the bridge of the song, black rabbits surround Havok's desk. After he looks down the balcony, the crowd has disappeared and instead sees Miss Murder staring back at him. He returns to his desk where Miss Murder approaches. She places her hand on his shoulder, then he shuts his eyes. The video ends with the black rabbit watching the murder.

An extended version of the music video was released afterward, featuring extra footage at the beginning of the video while the introductory track of Decemberunderground, "Prelude 12/21" is playing. It features Miss Murder writing a note, then consuming the note, which appears in Havok's mouth. The band is shown performing the track as well.

== Track listings ==
US promo single

1. "Miss Murder" (edit) – 3:18

UK / AU single

1. "Miss Murder" (edit) – 3:24
2. "Don't Change" (INXS cover) – 3:16
3. "Silver and Cold" (live acoustic) – 4:07
4. "Miss Murder" (music video)

7" vinyl picture disc

1. "Miss Murder" – 3:20
2. "Don't Change" (INXS cover) – 3:16

10" vinyl picture disc

1. "Miss Murder" – 3:20
2. "Rabbits are Roadkill on Route 37" – 3:51

Promo CDM

1. "Miss Murder (VNV Nation remix)" – 6:00
2. "Miss Murder (VNV Nation instrumental)" – 6:00
3. "Miss Murder (Broken Spindles remix)" – 4:12
4. "Miss Murder (Broken Spindles instrumental)" – 4:12

== Official versions ==
- "Miss Murder" (album version) – 3:27
- "Miss Murder" (edit) – 3:18
- "Miss Murder" (top 40 edit) – 3:05
- "Miss Murder" (VNV Nation remix) – 6:00
- "Miss Murder" (VNV Nation instrumental) – 6:00
- "Miss Murder" (Broken Spindles remix) – 4:12
- "Miss Murder" (Broken Spindles instrumental) – 4:12

== Charts ==
=== Weekly charts ===
Weekly chart performance for "Miss Murder"
Chart (2006)	Peak position
Australia (ARIA)	14
Canada CHR/Top 40 (Billboard)	46
Czech Republic Modern Rock (IFPI)	13
Germany (GfK)	93
Scottish Singles Sales (Official Charts)	34
UK Singles (Official Charts)	44
UK Rock & Metal (Official Charts)	2
US Billboard Hot 100	24
US Alternative Airplay (Billboard)	1
US Mainstream Rock (Billboard)	13
Venezuela Pop Rock (Record Report)	5

=== Year-end charts ===
Year-end chart performance for "Miss Murder"
Chart (2006)	Position
US Alternative Songs (Billboard)	4

== Certifications ==
Certifications for "Miss Murder"
Region	Certification	Certified units/sales
Australia (ARIA)	Platinum	70,000^{‡}
New Zealand (RMNZ)	Gold	15,000^{‡}
United Kingdom (BPI)	Silver	200,000^{‡}
^{‡} Sales+streaming figures based on certification alone.

== Release history ==
Release dates and formats for "Miss Murder"
Region	Date	Format	Label(s)	Ref.
United States	June 27, 2006	Mainstream airplay	Interscope	
