= Burials (album) =

Studio album by AFI
- Released: October 22, 2013
- Recorded: EastWest Studios, Los Angeles, California
- Genre: Gothic rock; alternative rock
- Length: 49:21
- Label: Republic
- Producer: Gil Norton

AFI chronology
| Crash Love (2009) | Burials (2013) | AFI (2017) |

Singles from Burials
- 1. "I Hope You Suffer" Released: July 22, 2013; 2. "17 Crimes" Released: August 6, 2013; 3. "The Conductor" Released: October 1, 2013; 4. "A Deep Slow Panic" Released: February 24, 2014; 5. "Heart Stops" Released: August 22, 2014

Burials is the ninth studio album by American rock band AFI. It was released on October 22, 2013, through Republic Records.

In a statement regarding the album, AFI frontman Davey Havok said, "This record is of silence, and the burials that result from that silence. It's of betrayal, cruelty, weakness, anxiety, panic – deep and slow – despair, injury and loss. And in this it is shamefully honest and resolutely unforgiving."

== Conception and composition ==
Vocalist Davey Havok has said the album has the darkest lyrics of any AFI album. In contrast to previous releases, Havok described Burials as being "very layered and very rich", adding that it was "far, far less straightforward than what we did on the last record, which – much like every record we create – was the result of a natural growth, a natural indication of where we are as songwriters now". This is the first AFI album to credit songwriters individually, as opposed to the band as a whole, since 1997's Shut Your Mouth and Open Your Eyes.

== Recording and production ==
The band worked with producer Gil Norton and engineer Andrew Scheps, while recording Burials in Los Angeles, California.

== Release ==
From April to June 2013, five black-and-white teaser videos were released on AFI's website. The band was later announced to play Riot Fest 2013, as well as being signed to Republic Records. On July 18, AFI's website was replaced with the single cover for "I Hope You Suffer" and a stream of the new song, which was made available for purchase on July 23; the same day, the album's title and release date were announced. On July 31, a music video was released for "I Hope You Suffer" Directed by directing duo Brad and Brian Palmer. It contained primarily shots of the band performing the song in black and white and contained similar imagery to the previously released teaser videos that where also created by Brad and Brian Palmer. The teaser videos paved the way for the art direction of the album. Images from the teasers can be seen on the inner sleeve and back of both the vinyl and CD releases.

Another single, "17 Crimes", was released on August 6; (Note: "17 Crimes" was made available for streaming on the day preceding its release on the iTunes Store.) on August 16, a music video was released. An EDM remix of the song was included on the soundtrack to the film The Mortal Instruments: City of Bones. The third single from the album, titled "The Conductor", was released on September 9, 2013. A new song from Burials, "A Deep Slow Panic", was made available for streaming on the website for Spin, along with a new interview of the band on October 10, 2013.

A new song from the album, "A Deep Slow Panic", was made available for streaming on the website for Spin, along with a new interview of the band on October 10, 2013. "A Deep Slow Panic" impacted radio on February 25, 2014. The song "Wild" appears on the soundtrack for EA Sports UFC.

== Critical reception ==
Professional ratings
Aggregate scores
| Source | Rating |
|---|---|
| Metacritic | 74/100 |
Review scores
| Source | Rating |
| AllMusic | 4/5 stars |
| Alternative Press | 4/5 stars |
| The A.V. Club | B |
| Rolling Stone | 2/5 stars |
| Sputnikmusic | 3.6/5 |

Burials has received generally positive reviews from music critics. At review aggregator site Metacritic, which assigns a normalized rating out of 100 to reviews from critics, the album received a score of 74 out of 100, indicating "generally favorable reviews based on 8 critics." Jason Heller of The A.V. Club gave the album a B rating, drawing similarities to the Cure on various songs. Matt Collar from Allmusic gave the album 4 stars out 5, saying, "With Burials, Havok and AFI don't just bury the castle of wrecked relationships, they put to rest any notions that they aren't kings of their dystopian rock kingdom." He highlighted "I Hope You Suffer", "17 Crimes", and "Greater Than 84" as the best tracks from the album. Similarly, Jason Pettigrew also awarded the album 4 stars out of 5, saying, "Overseen by producer Gil Norton [...] AFI's latest is top-loaded with atmosphere-enhancing, widescreen production that's so grandiose, it should have Michael Bay's name all over it", and wrote that "With Burials, AFI are going larger than life to get back into the small of their fans' hearts." However, Mike Powell conversely gave the album 2 stars out of 5 and gave a mixed review, saying, "'17 Crimes' and 'Greater Than 84' survive with the band's flair for camp still intact. Others drown in pools of eyeliner. Flamboyant, serious, plagued by problems he never gets too specific about, Davey Havok invents a role part Morrissey, part Bret Michaels – hair-metal pinup for the Hot Topic era."

== Commercial performance ==
The album debuted at No. 9 on the Billboard 200 with first week sales of 25,000 copies in the United States.

== Track listing ==
All lyrics are written by Davey Havok; all music is composed by Jade Puget.

Standard edition
| No. | Title | Length |
|---|---|---|
| 1. | "The Sinking Night" | 2:18 |
| 2. | "I Hope You Suffer" | 4:37 |
| 3. | "A Deep Slow Panic" | 4:01 |
| 4. | "No Resurrection" | 4:27 |
| 5. | "17 Crimes" | 2:57 |
| 6. | "The Conductor" | 3:41 |
| 7. | "Heart Stops" | 3:08 |
| 8. | "Rewind" | 4:12 |
| 9. | "The Embrace" | 3:25 |
| 10. | "Wild" | 3:11 |
| 11. | "Greater Than 84" | 4:17 |
| 12. | "Anxious" | 3:50 |
| 13. | "The Face Beneath the Waves" | 5:10 |
| Total length: | | 49:14 |

Best Buy exclusive and Japanese bonus track
| No. | Title | Length |
|---|---|---|
| 14. | "17 Crimes" (James Egbert remix) | 5:03 |

Best Buy exclusive bonus track
| No. | Title | Length |
|---|---|---|
| 15. | "17 Crimes" (ThankYouX remix) | 3:53 |

== Personnel ==
AFI

- Davey Havok – vocals
- Jade Puget – guitars
- Hunter Burgan – bass
- Adam Carson – drums

Production

- Gil Norton – production
- Dan Austin – engineering
- Andrew Scheps – mixing
- Justin Hergett – assistant mixing
- Brendan Dekora – assistant engineering
- Stephen Marcussen – mastering

Artwork

- AFI – art direction, design
- Morning Breath Inc. – art direction, design
- Surround – art direction, photography, images
- Brad Palmer – album art photography, album images
- Chris Anthony – band photography

== Charts ==
| Chart (2013) | Peak position |
|---|---|
| Australian Albums (ARIA) | 10 |
| UK Albums (OCC) | 59 |
| US Billboard Alternative Albums | 3 |
| US Billboard Hard Rock Albums | 2 |
| US Billboard Rock Albums | 3 |
| US Billboard 200 | 9 |
