= Fly in the ointment =

English-language idiomatic expression

In English, the phrase fly in the ointment is an idiomatic expression for a drawback, especially one that was not at first apparent, for example: "We had a cookstove, beans, and plates; the fly in the ointment was the lack of a can opener."

The likely source is a phrase in the biblical book of Ecclesiastes:

Dead flies cause the ointment of the apothecary to send forth a stinking savour. (Ecclesiastes 10:1)

For four centuries, a fly in the ointment has meant a small defect that spoils something valuable or is a source of annoyance. The modern version thus suggests that something unpleasant may come or has come to light in a proposition or condition that is almost too pleasing; that there is something wrong hidden, unexpected somewhere.

Example: "Our hospital is such an oasis of kindness and efficiency, but our orthopedic department is like a fly in the ointment."

== Sources ==
- The Fly in the Ointment: 70 Fascinating Commentaries on the Science of Everyday Life by Joseph A. Schwarcz, Ecw Press, May 28, 2004.
- 2107 Curious Word Origins, Sayings & Expressions from White Elephants to a Song and Dance by Charles Earle Funk (Galahad Book, New York, 1993
- Encyclopedia of Word and Phrase Origins by Robert Hendrickson (Facts on File, New York, 1997).
