= AFI (band) =

American rock band

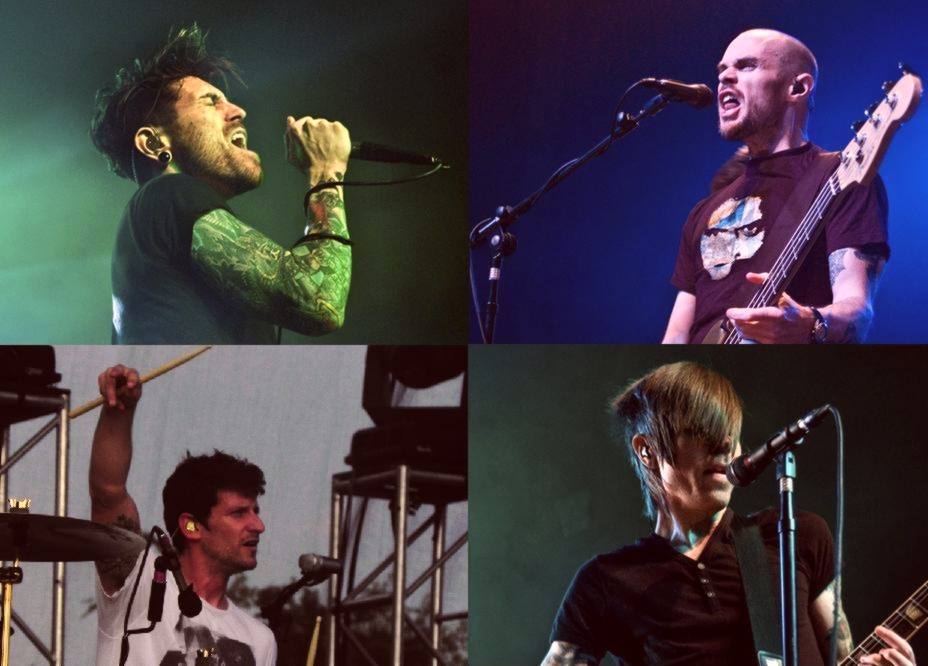
- From top left: Davey Havok, Hunter Burgan, Adam Carson, and Jade Puget

Background information
- Also known as: A Fire Inside (Note: "A Fire Inside" is first attested on the 1997 album Shut Your Mouth and Open Your Eyes. Previously, monikers such as "Abuncha Fuckin' Idiots" and "Anthems for Insubordinates" were used, with "Asking for It" being listed for fan mail.)
- Origin: Ukiah, California, U.S.
- Genres: Punk rock; gothic rock; horror punk; post-hardcore; emo; hardcore punk (early)
- Works: Discography
- Years active: 1991–present
- Labels: Run For Cover; Rise; Concord; Republic; Interscope; DreamWorks; Adeline; Nitro; Wingnut; Craig Schmoldt records; Key Lime Pie
- Spinoffs: Blaqk Audio; XTRMST; Dreamcar; Son of Sam; Tiger Army
- Members: Adam Carson; Davey Havok; Hunter Burgan; Jade Puget
- Past members: Mark Stopholese; Vic Chalker; Geoff Kresge
- Website: afireinside.net

AFI (A Fire Inside) is an American rock band from Ukiah, California, that was formed in 1991. It has comprised lead vocalist Davey Havok, drummer Adam Carson, bassist-keyboardist Hunter Burgan, and guitarist-keyboardist Jade Puget since 1998. Havok and Carson are the sole remaining original members, with founding guitarist Mark Stopholese having left in 1998. They began as a hardcore punk band in the 1990s but have since explored a myriad of genres. The century's turn saw them embrace horror punk before gaining mainstream popularity in the 2000s with a post-hardcore and emo sound, following which they have delved into alternative rock and gothic rock.

AFI has released twelve studio albums, ten EPs, one live album and one DVD. The band first reached substantial commercial success with their fifth album, The Art of Drowning (2000), which peaked at number 174 on the Billboard 200. They then broke into the mainstream with their sixth, Sing the Sorrow (2003), which peaked at number five on the Billboard 200 and remained on the chart for 51 weeks. The album was supported by popular singles "Girl's Not Grey" and "Silver and Cold", both of which peaked at number seven on America's Hot Modern Rock Tracks chart in 2003. "The Leaving Song Pt. II" was also released as a single, reaching number 16 on the chart. Sing the Sorrow was certified Platinum by the RIAA in 2006 and is AFI's best-selling release, having sold over 1.26 million copies as of September 2009.

AFI's seventh album, Decemberunderground (2006), debuted at number one on the Billboard 200 and featured the hit single "Miss Murder", which topped the Hot Modern Rock Tracks chart, reached number 24 on the Billboard Hot 100 (Note: Another single, "Love Like Winter", reached number four on the Modern Rock Tracks chart.) and appeared in the video game Guitar Hero III: Legends of Rock. The album was certified Platinum by the RIAA in 2013. Their next three albums, Crash Love (2009), Burials (2013) and AFI (2017), were also successful, peaking at increasing positions on the Billboard 200. (Note: Crash Love peaked at number twelve, Burials at number nine, and AFI at number five.) An EP, The Missing Man, followed in December 2018. The band released their eleventh album, Bodies, on June 11, 2021. Their twelfth, Silver Bleeds the Black Sun..., was released on October 3, 2025.

== History ==
=== Early years (1991–1994) ===
While still in high school in Ukiah, California, lead vocalist Davey Havok formed a band called AFI in November 1991 with Mark Stopholese and Vic Chalker. At the time, the band did not know how to play any instruments. Stopholese suggested that his friend, drummer Adam Carson, join the band. Stopholese learned guitar and Chalker learned bass, but Chalker was soon replaced by Geoff Kresge. By the end of October 1992, the band had played their first three shows, generally as an opener for a few other punk bands, including Influence 13, which featured future AFI guitarist Jade Puget and frequent collaborator Nick 13. AFI recorded their first EP, Dork (1993), with the now defunct band Loose Change, which also featured Puget.

The band briefly broke up in 1993, when the members left Ukiah to attend different colleges. They decided to commit to AFI full-time after an extremely positive experience and enthusiastic crowd response at a reunion show they played at The Phoenix Theater over Christmas break.

AFI relocated to Berkeley, California and lived in a squat that was a decommissioned fraternity house. Between 1993 and 1995, the band independently released vinyl EPs such as Behind the Times, Eddie Picnic's All Wet and Fly in the Ointment, as well as the compilation EPs This Is Berkeley, Not West Bay, AFI/Heckle, and Bombing the Bay (with Swingin' Utters).

=== First three albums (1995–1998) ===
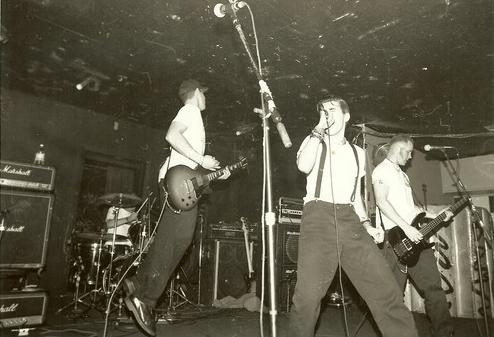
AFI performing at Berkeley Square in late 1995

AFI's first full-length album, Answer That and Stay Fashionable was released July 4, 1995, on Wingnut Records. It was co-produced by Doug Sangalang and Rancid's Tim Armstrong and Brett Reed. The album featured fast and upbeat hardcore songs, with humorous lyrical themes, which are vocalized in songs such as "Nyquil", "Cereal Wars", and "I Wanna Get a Mohawk (But Mom Won't Let Me Get One)". Around this time, they coined the term 'East Bay hardcore' to describe their genre.

AFI signed on to Nitro Records, a record label started by The Offspring's Dexter Holland and Greg K. AFI would remain with the label until the release of the 336 EP (2002). In 1996, they released their second album, Very Proud of Ya. Two songs from their previous album, "Yurf Rendenmein" and "Two of A Kind", were re-recorded for this album. After several tours in support of the album, bringing AFI for the first time to Pacific Northwest. Kresge decided to leave the group. His spot was filled by current AFI bassist Hunter Burgan for the remaining album tour dates with the bands first appearance in Idaho and Montana. With opening acts, Toxic Narcotic from Boston, and Potbelly from Washington State.

Burgan went on to help AFI record Shut Your Mouth and Open Your Eyes (1997) and was invited to become their full-time bassist. (Note: Snapcase member Frank Vicario had been asked to join the band on bass, and was even featured in a photo shoot, but Burgan's performance on the album convinced the rest of the band that he should join permanently.) Jade Puget, a former member of Influence 13 and Havok's close friend, also provided background vocals on the album, making it the first to feature the band's four current members. It is also the first album to be copyrighted to the band's official moniker, A Fire Inside. Subsequently, A Fire Inside EP (1998) was released, straying into some death rock territory and featuring a cover of the Cure and of the Misfits. It was Stopholese's last outing with the band.

=== Darker sound and wider reach (1999–2001) ===
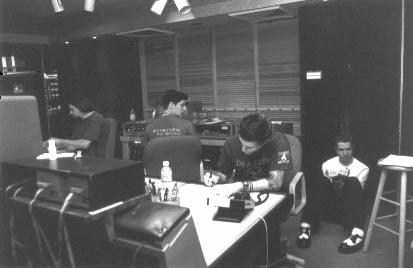
AFI in Hayward, California, during the recording of Black Sails in the Sunset

Puget became the band's lead guitarist for its next album, Black Sails in the Sunset (1999). The release maintains a punk rock or hardcore sound, exploring bleak themes with traces of Romanticism. (Note: A poem by Charles Baudelaire is whispered on the hidden track, "Midnight Sun".) In 2003, The New York Times reflected on it as showcasing Havok's "develop[ment] into a singer and songwriter of substance". The influence of gothic rock is also apparent and Dexter Holland provides backing vocals on two tracks.

The All Hallow's E.P. (1999) explored the horror punk genre with autumnal themes, including a cover of the Misfits song "Halloween". The song "The Boy Who Destroyed the World" was featured in the video game Tony Hawk's Pro Skater 3, and the single "Totalimmortal" was later covered by The Offspring.

On September 19, 2000, AFI released The Art of Drowning, which debuted on the Billboard Charts at number 174, and peaked at number 9 on the Heatseekers chart. It continued to touch base with the horror punk genre, but expanded into styles that were a departure from previous works. The album featured slower, more melodic songs that were more reminiscent of alternative rock, such as "Ever and a Day" and "6 to 8". Hardcore influences were present, more overtly on some tracks. The album sold over 100,000 copies. "The Days of the Phoenix" was released as a single and video and had some moderate mainstream success, garnering the band more TV and radio airplay. The song reached the UK Singles Chart with its titular EP in 2001, peaking at number 152. The success of The Art of Drowning helped to encourage the band to pursue higher mainstream notoriety.

=== Mainstream labels and popularity (2002–2007) ===
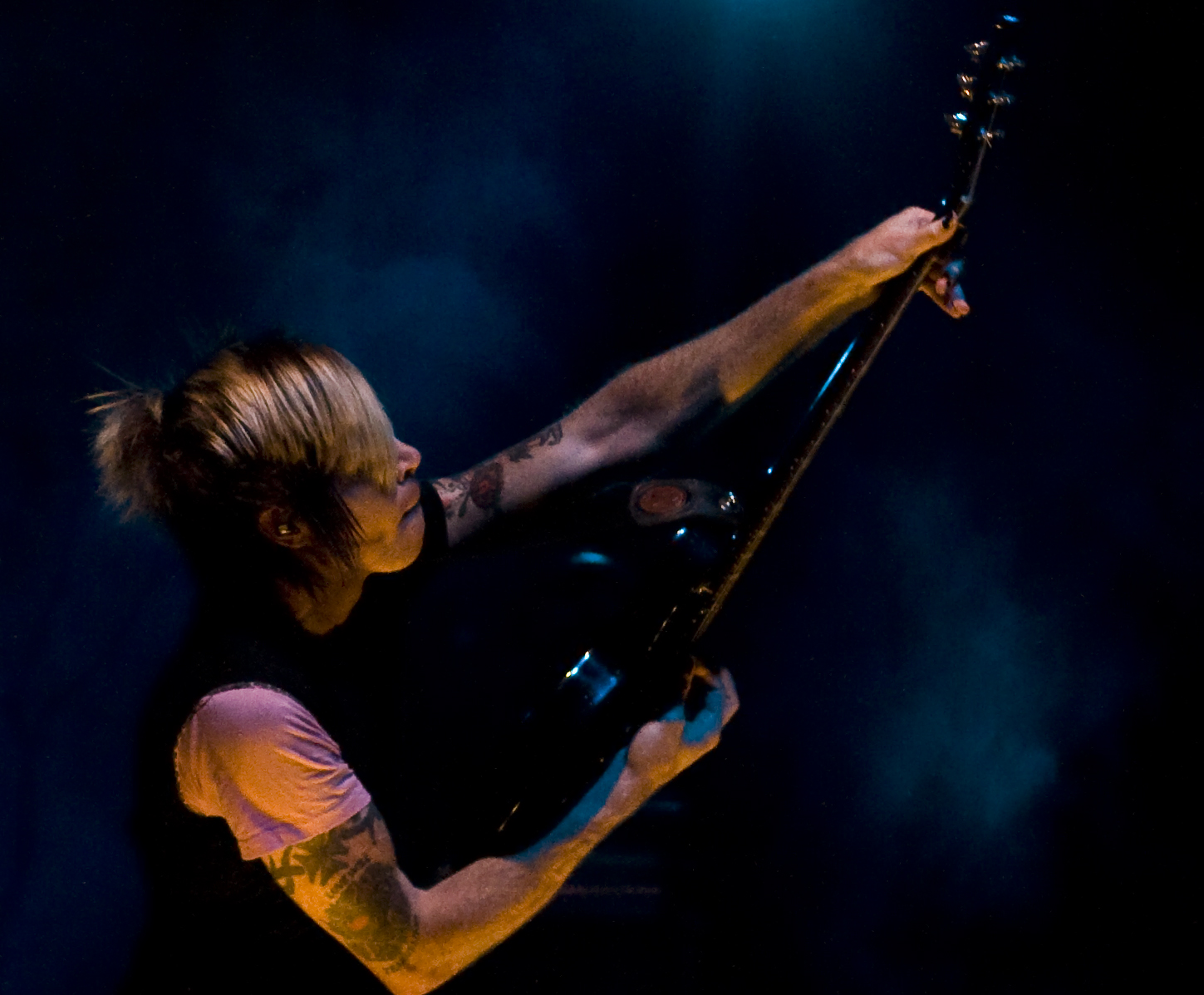
Guitarist Jade Puget

In 2002, AFI left Nitro Records. DreamWorks Records artists and repertoire executive Luke Wood signed them to the label following intense interest. Their first album for the label, Sing the Sorrow, was released in 2003. The album opened in Billboard's top ten and scored enthusiastic lead reviews in major music magazines. The songs "Girl's Not Grey", "The Leaving Song Pt. II", and "Silver and Cold" had some Billboard chart success and exposed the band to even larger audiences. They were nominated in the 2003 MTV Video Music Awards for the MTV2 award category for the "Girl's Not Grey" video, which came to be their first VMA.

In June 2006, AFI's seventh studio album, Decemberunderground, was released on Interscope Records. The album's first single, "Miss Murder", reached No. 1 on the Billboard Modern Rock Charts. The release reflects the continually changing and growing fan base of the band, and the album debuted as No. 1 on the Billboard charts. The album has been certified Gold by the RIAA for sales of over 500,000 copies of the album. The album's second single, "Love Like Winter", was successful on MTV's Total Request Live and was retired after 40 days on the countdown.

On December 12, 2006, AFI released their first DVD, I Heard a Voice – Live from Long Beach Arena, featuring a live performance shot in Long Beach, California. The performance was later released on December 13, 2007, as a live album, and charted at number 133 on the Billboard 200, and number 16 on the Hard Rock Albums chart. The album was well-received, with punknews.org giving it a four-star rating and commenting that when hearing or seeing the performance "you begin to realize AFI are truly a great live band," and that at some points "Pantera would say turn the noise down."

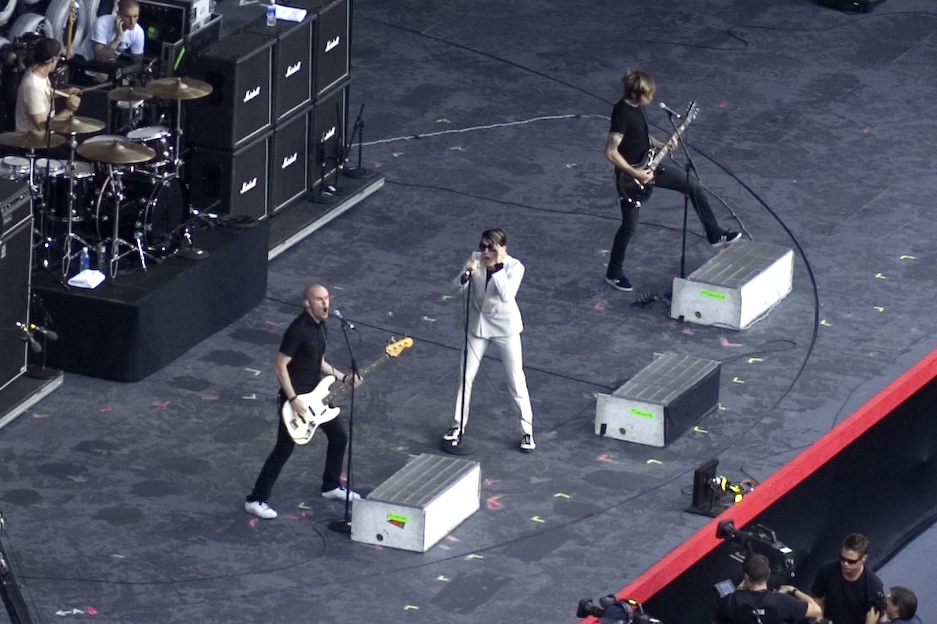
AFI performing on the American leg of Live Earth in 2007

On July 7, 2007, AFI performed on the American leg of Live Earth. They performed "The Missing Frame", "Love Like Winter", "Miss Murder", and a cover of David Bowie's "Ziggy Stardust".

=== Crash Love, Burials and The Blood Album (2008–2017) ===
In July 2009, Havok announced that after two years of writing and recording, a new album titled Crash Love would be released on September 29, 2009. It was recorded with producer David Bottrill (who was later dismissed in favor of Joe McGrath and Jacknife Lee). The first single from the album, "Medicate", was released on August 25, 2009, and reached number 7 on the Billboard Alternative Songs Chart. Another single, "Beautiful Thieves", followed later in the year. Havok called Crash Love "the album by which we'll be remembered". It was the band's first release to make a significantly smaller impact than their previous effort, but peaked at number 12 on the Billboard 200.

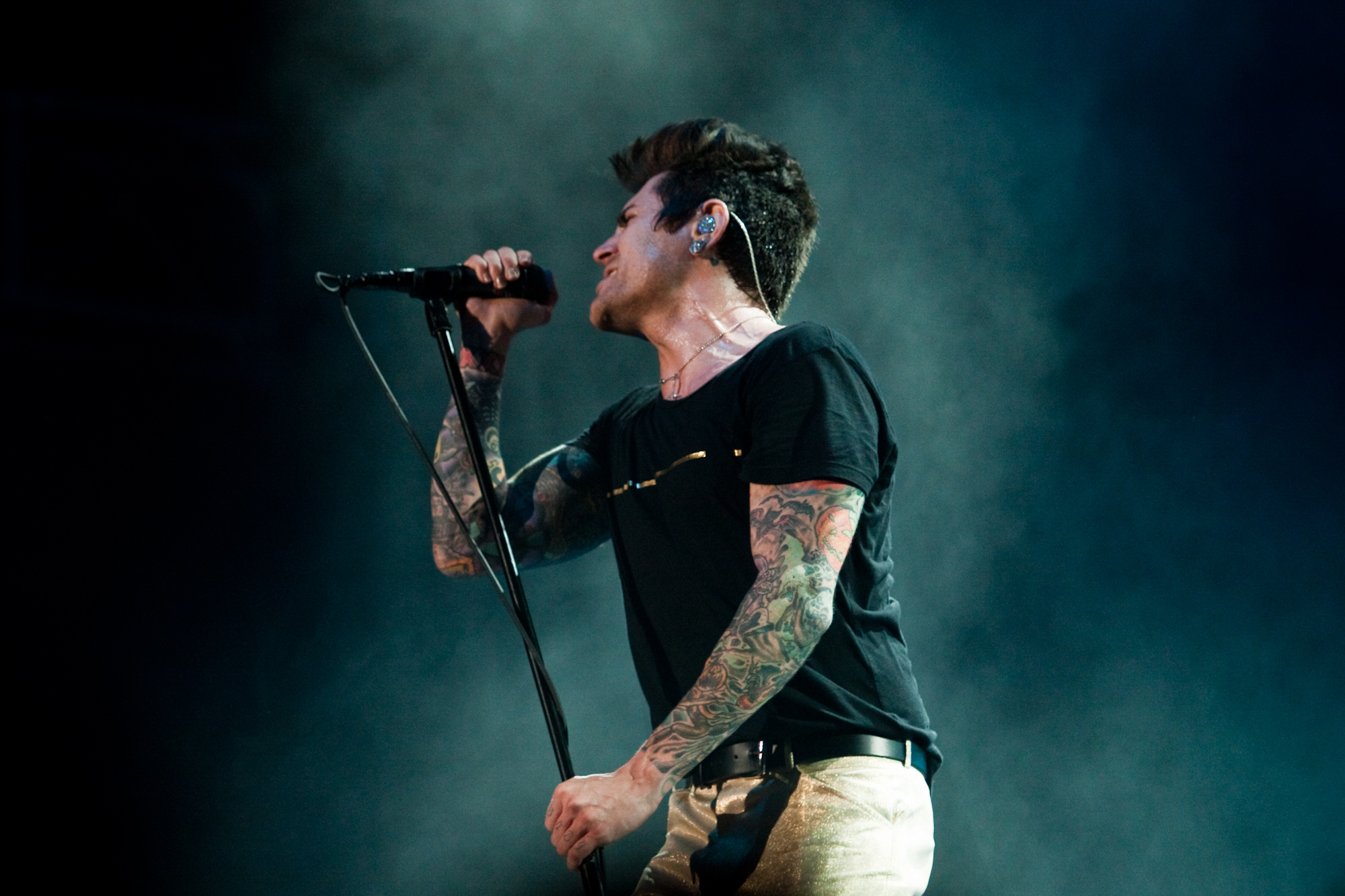
Lead vocalist Davey Havok

From April to June 2013, several teaser videos were released on AFI's website. The band was announced to play Riot Fest 2013, as well as being signed to Republic Records. A single titled "I Hope You Suffer" was released on July 23, and the title of the album, Burials, was announced. Another single, "17 Crimes", was released on August 6. The third single from the album, titled "The Conductor", was released on September 9. The album was released on October 22, produced by Gil Norton. It peaked at number 9 on the Billboard 200.

In a June 2016 interview with Aggressive Tendencies, Puget confirmed that AFI had begun working on new material for their tenth studio album. On October 27, the band released two new songs via Spotify, "Snow Cats" and "White Offerings".

The band's tenth album, AFI (also known as The Blood Album), was released on January 20, 2017. Puget served as the main producer. The album peaked at number 5 on the Billboard 200. Other singles were released, including "Aurelia" and "Hidden Knives".

=== The Missing Man, Bodies and Silver Bleeds the Black Sun... (2018–present) ===
On October 26, 2018, the band surprise-released a new single called "Get Dark" on Spotify and iTunes. This was followed by The Missing Man EP on December 7, featuring five new songs.

On March 25, 2020, AFI was announced as a headliner for the Two Thousand Trees Festival on July 10 of the same year. Puget was interviewed by Kerrang! to promote the festival appearance and said that "hopefully at least a couple of songs" from the band's eleventh album would be released by then. On April 27, 2020, Puget said that the album was finished, but that its release date was being pushed back as a result of the COVID-19 pandemic. The next day, it was announced that the Two Thousand Trees Festival was being pushed back to 2021, also due to the pandemic.

On January 15, 2021, the band released the tracks "Twisted Tongues" and "Escape from Los Angeles". On February 25, it was revealed that the album would be called Bodies, and be released on June 11. Along with the announcement, the band revealed two new songs as another joint single, "Looking Tragic / Begging for Trouble". On April 9, "Dulceria / Far Too Near" were released, followed by "Tied to a Tree" on May 25.

On March 11, 2023, AFI played Sing the Sorrow in full for the first and last time at the Kia Forum on the album's 20th anniversary, supported by Jawbreaker, Chelsea Wolfe and Choir Boy. Following a tour supporting Green Day in March 2025, the band announced their twelfth studio album Silver Bleeds the Black Sun..., which was released in October 2025 via Run for Cover Records – marking their first release with the label.

The band toured in April 2026 with American synth-pop band Choir Boy.

== Musical style ==
AFI's music has been classified under many genres of music, including punk rock, hardcore punk, emo, gothic rock, horror punk, post-hardcore, skate punk, alternative rock, screamo, garage punk, and pop-punk.

AFI's sound has constantly changed. AFI originally were a hardcore punk band. AFI's first three albums, Answer That and Stay Fashionable (1995), Very Proud of Ya (1996), and Shut Your Mouth and Open Your Eyes (1997), all have been described as hardcore punk. AFI's fourth album Black Sails in the Sunset and the band's fifth album The Art of Drowning both have been described as horror punk. AFI's 2003 album Sing the Sorrow is considered post-hardcore and emo. Decemberunderground, which features elements of music genres like electronic, new wave, industrial, punk rock, hardcore punk, and synthpop, is considered alternative rock, post-hardcore and emo. AFI's 2009 album Crash Love is considered alternative rock and pop rock. AFI's 2013 album Burials is considered alternative rock and gothic rock. AFI's 2017 self-titled album, also referred to as The Blood Album, has been described as new wave, post-punk and gothic rock. In 2021 AFI released their 11th album Bodies, which has been described as continuing their gothic rock sound and taking a greater influence from new wave.

Louder wrote, "Long before My Chemical Romance topped the charts with the anthemic ‘'Welcome to the Black Parade'’, California's AFI were already injecting their brand of punk with gothic imagery and a sense of theatricality. By the time Gerard Way’s band arrived, AFI had already built a devoted fan base incorporating punks, hardcore fans, goths, metallers and every other type of musical pariah imaginable. They were a band that couldn't help but stand out everywhere they went." AllMusic described AFI as "Northern California hardcore punk revivalists" whose style "evolved to include alternative rock, post-punk, emo, and new wave flair". The Chicago Tribune said that the band "morphed from a conventional garage-punk band into a gothic-rock arena act." Loudwire said that the band "developed from more of a SoCal punk style into a somewhat gothic post-hardcore band". The Encyclopedia of Popular Music said that "Although often described as a cross between goth rock and hardcore punk, by the time of their commercial breakthrough in 2003, [AFI] started out as a straight ahead skate/punk band." PopMatters wrote, "To call California-based hardcore/screamo quartet A.F.I. a band without a flag in the current modern rock landscape is not an unfair assessment of their situation." Rolling Stone categorized the band as pop-punk. AFI has often been labeled as "gothic punk" due to the band's appearance, but AFI band members never considered the label accurate. Jade Puget has said, "Goth-punk isn't a style of music, it doesn't even exist."

Puget, who has produced much of the band's music, stated in 2021:

Anyone who knows our catalog knows that no two records really sit together. Some sit a little closer, maybe. We do certain things, just by virtue of who we are, that are consistent, but those things come about organically. Every time we do something, I have to judge it on its own merits. Some fans are going to judge a new album, or a new song, based on what's come before. But as artists, we can't do that, because it would only hinder our creativity.

== Influences ==
AFI have drawn inspiration from a diverse range of artists. "We have many, many influences that span the musical spectrum", Havok told the Boston Globe. "Each of us grew up on everything from punk to hardcore to dark '80s UK stuff like the Cure, Bauhaus, Joy Division, and [the] Sisters of Mercy. And there were rock bands like Guns N' Roses and Metallica and industrial bands like Skinny Puppy, Ministry, Front 242 and Alien Sex Fiend. And we all love the Smiths." AFI have also been influenced by electronic band OMD, whom Havok said "have and will continue to musically and emotionally inspire" him.

Other groups that have inspired AFI include Echo & the Bunnymen (particularly Heaven Up Here), Malcolm McLaren (particularly Swamp Thing), Red Lorry Yellow Lorry, John McLear Kim, the Creatures, Bad Religion, Blatz, Deftones, Econochrist, Tom Waits, Jawbreaker, Samiam, Dead Kennedys, Sly & the Family Stone, Neurosis, Operation Ivy, Rancid, the Yah Mos, Crimpshrine, Death Angel, Exodus, Faith No More, Mr. Bungle, Primus, Green Day, Filth, the Teen Idles, Dag Nasty, Government Issue, Negative Approach, Earth Crisis, Snapcase, Refused, Sick of it All, the Cro-Mags, Minor Threat, Black Flag, the Misfits, the Germs, and State of Alert.

== Legacy ==
On Black Sails in the Sunset helped to establish a new wave of horror punk bands that included Blitzkid, Murderdolls and the Creepshow. A 2022 article published by Metal Hammer the album as having "reinvented the horror punk of the Misfits for a new generation".

According to the Sydney Morning Herald, AFI have been "hailed as being responsible for bringing back the big '80s rock chorus." The band has received much praise in particular from Alternative Press, which has supported the group since the mid-1990s. The publication rated the band's major-label debut, Sing the Sorrow, as the most anticipated album of 2003, and noted that it "blew the doors off goth-punk as we knew it". AFI has also been granted responsibility for paving the way for the rise of the visual element of rock bands in the 2000s; in a December 2006 article, Revolver wrote that "AFI have increased the importance of a band's visual identity and the flair for the theatrical," adding that "when a group like Panic! at the Disco borrows imagery from a movie such as Moulin Rouge!, you have to consider the precedent AFI set when they borrowed cues from Tim Burton's The Nightmare Before Christmas." Shoutmouth.com placed AFI at number 22 on its list of the 25 most influential punk bands, noting that the band "have evolved with each album, showing that a punk band can not only change, but stay true to their sound at the same time. AFI have been on a constant rise through their career, and as such, eeked [sic] out the honors". After Sing the Sorrow's release, Yorkshire Evening Post described Havok's voice as one of those "you'll love or hate, but one thing can't be denied, this guy has range beyond belief". Recognized by his trademark flair and vocal style, Havok has been recognized as "a bona fide rock god" by Alternative Press.

In 2003, The Pitch described the band's fan club as a "particularly excitable bunch", adding that "there's also the type of sentiments that put the cult back into cult success, such as links to something called 'the Church of Havok'."

AFI have been cited as an influence by Avenged Sevenfold. Atreyu, Eighteen Visions, Bleeding Through, Panic! at the Disco, Aiden, From First to Last, Lostprophets, Hawthorne Heights, Funeral for a Friend, the Used, My Chemical Romance, Senses Fail, Pierce the Veil, Modern Error, Rise Against, Tsunami Bomb, Bleeders, I am Ghost, the Nerve Agents, Energy, Miss Vincent, Creeper, Our Time Down Here, Salem, Calabrese, Ceremony, More Than Life, the Ghost Inside, Love is Noise, the White Noise, Touché Amoré, Scowl, Deafheaven, Joyce Manor, New Years Day, Trivium, Poorstacy, Taking Back Sunday, Phoxjaw, the Wytches, Black Veil Brides and Motionless in White.

Their songs have been covered by bands including the Offspring, Harm's Way, God's Hate, Twitching Tongues and Gnarwolves.

== Band members ==
Current

- Davey Havok – lead vocals (1991–present)
- Adam Carson – drums, backing vocals, percussion (1991–present)
- Hunter Burgan – bass, backing vocals, keyboards, programming (1997–present; session musician 1997)
- Jade Puget – guitars, backing vocals, keyboards, piano, synthesizers, programming (1998–present, session musician 1996–1997)

Former

- Mark Stopholese – guitars, backing vocals (1991–1998)
- Vic Chalker – bass (1991–1992)
- Geoff Kresge – bass, backing vocals (1992–1997)

Timeline

== Discography ==
Studio albums

- Answer That and Stay Fashionable (1995)
- Very Proud of Ya (1996)
- Shut Your Mouth and Open Your Eyes (1997)
- Black Sails in the Sunset (1999)
- The Art of Drowning (2000)
- Sing the Sorrow (2003)
- Decemberunderground (2006)
- Crash Love (2009)
- Burials (2013)
- AFI (2017)
- Bodies (2021)
- Silver Bleeds the Black Sun... (2025)
