= The Leaving Song Pt. II =

2003 single by AFI

Single by AFI

from the album Sing the Sorrow
- Released: September 8, 2003 (UK)
- Recorded: 2002
- Genre: Post-hardcore; emo; hardcore punk
- Length: 3:31
- Label: DreamWorks
- Songwriters: Hunter Burgan, Adam Carson, David Paden Marchand, Jade Puget
- Producer: Jerry Finn

AFI singles chronology
"Girl's Not Grey" (2003)	"The Leaving Song Pt. II" (2003)	"Silver and Cold" (2003)

"The Leaving Song Pt. II" is a song by American rock band AFI. It was released as the second single from their sixth studio album Sing the Sorrow on September 8, 2003. It was also released to radio on June 3, 2003.

The song peaked at number 16 on the US Alternative Songs chart and number 27 in Australia.

== Background ==
"The Leaving Song Pt. II" featured on the soundtrack of Madden 2004.

Background vocals are provided by Anna-Lynne Williams of the band Trespassers William, which was also the first time that she did session work for another artist. She recorded her parts in roughly an hour at the Cello Studios in Los Angeles.

== Track listing ==
UK 7"

1. "The Leaving Song Pt. II" – 3:31
2. "The Great Disappointment" (demo) – 5:01

Australian tour edition CD

1. "The Leaving Song Pt. II" – 3:31
2. "This Celluloid Dream" (demo) – 4:18
3. "Synesthesia" (demo) – 4:35
4. "Girl's Not Grey" (final music video) – 3:11

Germany CD

1. "The Leaving Song Pt. II" – 3:31
2. "The Great Disappointment" (demo) – 5:01

EU Cassette

1. "The Leaving Song Pt. II" – 3:31

UK CD 1

1. "The Leaving Song Pt. II" – 3:31
2. "The Great Disappointment" (demo) – 5:01
3. "Paper Airplanes" (demo) – 4:04
4. "The Leaving Song Pt. II" (music video) – 3:32

UK CD 2

1. "The Leaving Song Pt. II" – 3:31
2. "...but home is nowhere" (demo) – 3:42
3. "The Leaving Song (demo) – 2:34

== Music video ==
A music video was directed by Marc Webb and filmed at a warehouse in Los Angeles in May 2003.

It features the band performing in suits in front of a moshing crowd, executing hardcore dancing style punch-and-kick moves. Members of the crowd are shown applying athletic tape and straight edge-culture gloves on their hands before the gig. The band members are shown preparing for the show as well. Havok drops the mic and walks off stage at the end of the video. The song used while the crowd is moshing was a song by the band Hatebreed.

== Chart positions ==
Chart (2003)	Peak position
Australia (ARIA)	27
UK Singles (Official Charts)	43
US Alternative Airplay (Billboard)	16
US Mainstream Rock (Billboard)	31
