= Tim Timebomb =

American punk rock project

Tim Timebomb is a music project by Tim Armstrong, best known as a member of the punk rock band Rancid. Armstrong has recorded a large number of songs – a mixture of cover versions, including Rancid covers, and original songs, including some tracks from his musical film project RocknNRoll Theater – with a variety of supporting musicians.

A selection of the material was first released as a download only album Tim Timebomb Sings Songs from RocknNRoll Theater – this consisting of original songs featured in Armstrong's musical film series "RockNRoll Theatre". Starting on October 29, 2012, a series of digital singles have also been released, on a daily basis. These singles are initially being released via YouTube, with one song each day being released from October 29, 2012, onwards, and then being made available for download via iTunes. To date, all of the tracks from the RockNRollTheatre album have also been included in the series of singles, with the exception of the track "Let's Fuck".

== Choice of music ==
According to Armstrong's website:

Tim Timebomb and Friends is a place for me to share with you some of my favorite songs that I've recorded with friends of mine. I've always enjoyed sharing music, whether I'm just sitting around playing acoustic guitar with my friends or breaking out old 45's. I guess you could call me a music nerd. I like everything from Bob Dylan to the Ramones, to Jimmy Cliff to Cock Sparrer. I plan to bring together a great group of players to record covers as well as some originals. I hope you dig it and encourage you to pass them on.

All of Armstrong's bandmates in Rancid appear along with Ryan Foltz, formerly of Dropkick Murphys, Travis Barker and members of The Interrupters and The Ohio Ramblers. Three of the album's songs, "That's Just The Way It Is Now", which was featured on Rancid's 2009 album, Let the Dominoes Fall, "I'm Real" and "No More Living" were written by Armstrong in 2007 while in Spain and are inspired by the classic 1964 Vincent Price movie, The Last Man on Earth which was based on the 1954 novel, I Am Legend.

== Albums ==
Tim Timebomb Sings Songs from RockNRoll Theater

Studio album by Tim Armstrong
- Released: 2012
- Recorded: 2012
- Genre: Punk
- Length: 33:36
- Label: Hellcat
- Producer: Tim Armstrong

Tim Timebomb Sings RocknRoll Theater

The album features versions of songs from the RockNRoll Theatre film series, which is produced by Armstrong. 13 of the 14 tracks have also been released as digital singles.

Armstrong sings the lead vocals on all songs, in contrast to the versions in the films, which are sung by the actors, including Lars Frederiksen and Davey Havok.

Track list: All songs written by Tim Armstrong.

1. We Did Alright
2. Guardian Angel
3. No Reverence
4. Honor Is All We Know
5. Just for Tonight
6. Change That Song Mr. DJ
7. Running Out of Time
8. Skeleton Crew
9. This Time We Got It Right
10. Everything I Need
11. Oh Hollywood
12. No More Living
13. Let's Fuck
14. Misconceptions

2013–2014 Pirates Press Records Releases

7" singles

She's Drunk All The Time b/w Tulare

30 Pieces of Silver b/w Ooh La La

Change That Song Mr. DJ b/w Guardian Angel

Three 12 song collections from below singles released as a bundle packs on CD and vinyl via Pirates Press Records

High Noon in a Dark Blue Sea

1. Honor Is All We Know
2. Change That Song Mr. DJ
3. She Goes to Finos
4. Do What You Want
5. I Wanna Get Rid of You
6. Children's Bread
7. In the City
8. Television
9. Oh No
10. No Reverence
11. Guardian Angel
12. Cupid Aims

Winding Far Down

1. 30 Pieces of Silver
2. Let's Do Rocksteady
3. Too Much Pressure
4. Summer of '69
5. Concrete Jungle
6. Lip Up Fatty
7. Working
8. Ohh La La
9. This Time We Got It Right
10. Just for Tonight
11. Ruby Soho
12. Saturday Night at the Movies

Special Lunacy

1. She's Drunk All the Time
2. Chill's and Fever
3. Rock This Joint
4. Till the Well Runs Dry
5. Jim Dandy
6. Yes Sir
7. I'm Movin' On
8. My Buckets Got a Hole in It
9. Adalida
10. Thanks a Lot
11. I'm Going Down
12. Blue Skies

== Singles ==
Title	Original artist / Notes	Writer(s)	Release date	Length
Honor Is All We Know	Later recorded by Rancid for their eighth album Honor Is All We Know	Tim Armstrong	29-Oct-2012	2:17
Adalida	George Strait	Mike Geiger, Woody Mullis, Michael Huffman	30-Oct-2012	3:36
Guardian Angel	–	Tim Armstrong	31-Oct-2012	2:21
Coming to Your Rescue	The Triumphs	C. Thomas	01-Nov-2012	2:41
American Without Tears	Elvis Costello	Elvis Costello	02-Nov-2012	4:50
She's Drunk All the Time		Tim Armstrong and Kevin Bivona	03-Nov-2012	2:55
I'm Movin' On	Hank Snow	Hank Snow	04-Nov-2012	2:39
This Time We Got It Right	–	Tim Armstrong	05-Nov-2012	2:55
Ooh La La	The Faces	Ronnie Lane and Ronnie Wood	06-Nov-2012	3:35
Just for Tonight	-	Tim Armstrong	07-Nov-2012	3:01
Concrete Jungle	The Specials	Roddy Radiation	08-Nov-2012	3:21
Change That Song Mr DJ	-	Tim Armstrong	09-Nov-2012	2:05
Saturday Night at the Movies	The Drifters	Barry Mann & Cynthia Weil	10-Nov-2012	2:54
It's Quite Alright	Rancid	Tim Armstrong	11-Nov-2012	1:47
Runnin Outta Time	-	Tim Armstrong	12-Nov-2012	1:40
Night Owl	Tony Allen	Tony Allen	13-Nov-2012	3:23
Poison	Rancid	Tim Armstrong	14-Nov-2012	1:20
Everything I Need	-	Tim Armstrong	15-Nov-2012	2:11
Trouble	Recorded/unreleased song from Rancid's 2003 album, Indestructible, recorded by Pink	Tim Armstrong, Pink	16-Nov-2012	3:17
Swallow My Pride	Ramones	Dee Dee Ramone	17-Nov-2012	2:35
Heaven Only Knows	The Shangri-Las	Ellie Greenwich Jeff Barry	18-Nov-2012	1:51
Let's Do Rocksteady	The Bodysnatchers	The Bodysnatchers	19-Nov-2012	2:59
Choo Choo Ch'Boogie	Louis Jordan & His Tympany Five	Denver Darling, Vaughn Horton, Milt Gabler	20-Nov-2012	2:48
Buckets of Rain	Bob Dylan	Bob Dylan	21-Nov-2012	3:07
I'm Goin' Down	Bruce Springsteen	Bruce Springsteen	22-Nov-2012	3:59
Sixteen Tons	Merle Travis	Merle Travis	23-Nov-2012	2:24
Thirty Pieces of Silver	Prince Buster	Prince Buster	24-Nov-2012	2:39
Skeleton Crew	-	Tim Armstrong	25-Nov-2012	2:03
Bad Luck	Social Distortion	Mike Ness	26-Nov-2012	4:33
Lip Up Fatty	Bad Manners	Bad Manners	27-Nov-2012	2:51
Too Much Pressure	The Selecter	Neol Davies	28-Nov-2012	3:17
Rocket 88	Jackie Brentson and his Delta Cats	Ike Turner	29-Nov-2012	2:50
Oh Lonesome Me	Don Gibson	Don Gibson	30-Nov-2012	2:08
Save It For Later	The Beat	The Beat	01-Dec-2012	3:19
Cuz I Ain't Gone Yet		Tim Armstrong	02-Dec-2012	3:29
We Did Alright	-	Tim Armstrong	03-Dec-2012	2:16
If Teardrops Were Pennies	Carl Butler	Carl Butler	04-Dec-2012	2:01
Chasing the Night	The Ramones	Ramones	05-Dec-2012	3:05
My Bucket's Got a Hole In It	traditional	traditional	06-Dec-2012	2:07
Oh Hollywood	-	Tim Armstrong	07-Dec-2012	3:16
Indestructible	Rancid	Tim Armstrong	08-Dec-2012	2:01
The Letter	The Box Tops	Wayne Carson Thompson	09-Dec-2012	2:12
Adina	Rancid	Tim Armstrong & Matt Freeman	10-Dec-2012	2:14
Harry Bridges	Rancid	Tim Armstrong	11-Dec-2012	2:58
Bridge of Gold	Devils Brigade	Matt Freeman, Tim Armstrong	12-Dec-2012	2:51
Different	Ximena Sarinana	Tim Armstrong	13-Dec-2012	3:41
Thanks a Lot	Eddie Miller	Eddie Miller and Don Sessions	14-Dec-2012	2:37
Up to No Good	Rancid	Tim Armstrong	15-Dec-2012	3:04
Dark as a Dungeon	Merle Travis	Merle Travis	16-Dec-2012	2:23
Wrongful Suspicion	Rancid	Tim Armstrong	17-Dec-2012	3:33
Honkytonk Hardwood Floor	Tex Atchison	Tex Atchison, Scotty Harrell, and Eddie Hazelwood	18-Dec-2012	2:30
That's Just the Way It Is Now	Rancid	Tim Armstrong	19-Dec-2012	2:35
She Goes to Finos	Toy Dolls	Michael Algar	20-Dec-2012	2:46
I Wanna Wanna Wanna Wanna Wanna Wanna Wanna Get Rid of You	Psychotic Pineapple	A.Carlin, J.Seabury	21-Dec-2012	2:05
You're a Mean One, Mr. Grinch	Thurl Ravenscroft	Albert Hague and Dr. Seuss	22-Dec-2012	2:58
I'm Real		Tim Armstrong	23-Dec-2012	2:20
Do You Wanna Dance?	Bobby Freeman	Bobby Freeman	24-Dec-2012	2:26
Drivin'	Pearl Harbor and the Explosions	Pearl E. Gates, Peter Built, John Stench, Hilary Stench	25-Dec-2012	3:28
No More Living	–	Tim Armstrong	26-Dec-2012	2:48
King of the Jungle	The Last Resort	Roi Pearce	27-Dec-2012	3:39
Lodi	Creedence Clearwater Revival	John Fogerty	28-Dec-2012	3:17
Na Na Na		Tim Armstrong	29-Dec-2012	3:08
Cupid Aims		Tim Armstrong	30-Dec-2012	1:45
No Reverence	–	Tim Armstrong	31-Dec-2012	2:25
Misconceptions of Hell	–	Tim Armstrong	01-Jan-2013	3:02
Safety Pin Stuck In My Heart	Patrik Fitzgerald	Patrik Fitzgerald	02-Jan-2013	2:36
Family		Tim Armstrong & The Interrupters	03-Jan-2013	2:41
Blueprint	Fugazi	Guy Picciotto	04-Jan-2013	4:03
(Between the Two of Us) One of Us Has the Answer		Tim Armstrong & Dave Berg	05-Jan-2013	4:09
Goin' Down That Road	Ersel Hickey	Ersel Hickey	06-Jan-2013	1:47
Ramblin' Man	Hank Williams Sr.	Hank Williams Sr.	07-Jan-2013	3:13
Alcohol	Charged GBH	Charged GBH	08-Jan-2013	2:33
Disorder & Disarray	Rancid	Tim Armstrong	09-Jan-2013	2:04
Battering Ram	Rancid	Tim Armstrong, Matt Freeman, Brett Reed	10-Jan-2013	3:15
Cabin on the Hill	Published in 1943 in James D. Vaughn songbook company's book Sacred Thoughts	Bolivar Lee Shook	11-Jan-2013	2:32
Texas Tornado	The Sir Douglas Band	Doug Sahm	12-Jan-2013	2:57
I'll Do It Every Time	Johnny Horton	Johnny Horton	13-Jan-2013	2:23
It's So Easy	Buddy Holly	Buddy Holly and Norman Petty	14-Jan-2013	2:05
I'm Not the Only One	Rancid	Tim Armstrong, Matt Freeman, Brett Reed	15-Jan-2013	2:48
I'm Just Here to Get My Baby Out of Jail	Karl & Harty	Harty Taylor, Karl Davis	16-Jan-2013	3:14
Rich Girl	Hall & Oates	Daryl Hall	17-Jan-2013	2:24
California Sun	Joe Jones	Henry Glover & Morris Levy	18-Jan-2013	2:03
Into Action	Previous version on A Poet's Life	Tim Armstrong	19-Jan-2013	3:36
Children's Bread	Jimmy Cliff	Tim Armstrong & Jimmy Cliff	20-Jan-2013	3:31
Crawdad Hole	traditional	traditional	21-Jan-2013	3:11
Oh No	Previous version on A Poet's Life	Tim Armstrong	22-Jan-2013	3:02
Humble Neighbourhoods	Pink	Tim Armstrong & Pink	23-Jan-2013	3:37
Roots Radicals	Rancid	Tim Armstrong	24-Jan-2013	2:54
Squeeze Box	The Who	Pete Townshend	25-Jan-2013	2:41
High Roller Baby	Joe Walsh	Tim Armstrong	26-Jan-2013	3:13
Walking in the Rain	Flash And The Pan	Harry Vanda and George Young	27-Jan-2013	3:11
The Times They Are A-Changin'	Bob Dylan	Bob Dylan	28-Jan-2013	3:13
Life's for Livin'		Tim Armstrong	29-Jan-2013	2:47
80,000 Miles of Wire		Tim Armstrong	30-Jan-2013	1:53
In the City	The Jam	Paul Weller	31-Jan-2013	2:21
When It's Springtime in Alaska (It's 40 Below)	Johnny Horton	Johnny Horton and Tillman Franks	01-Feb-2013	3:02
Abilene	George Hamilton IV	John David Loudermilk and Bob Gibson	02-Feb-2013	2:15
Bye Bye Love	The Everly Brothers	Felice and Boudleaux Bryant	03-Feb-2013	2:21
Please Give Me Something	Bill Allen and the Back Beats	B. Feli & J. Feli	04-Feb-2013	2:41
Django	Rancid	Tim Armstrong	05-Feb-2013	3:41
If the Kids Are United	Sham 69	Jimmy Pursey and Dave Guy Parsons	06-Feb-2013	2:42
Working	Cock Sparrer	Cock Sparrer	07-Feb-2013	2:44
Bob	NOFX	Mike Burkett	08-Feb-2013	2:01
If I Had Me a Woman	Mac Curtis	Jim Shell	09-Feb-2013	2:26
It Rains, Rain	Glen Glenn	Pete Stamper	10-Feb-2013	2:36
From Bad to Worse	The Ethiopians	Leonard Dillon	11-Feb-2013	2:23
Summer of 69'	Bryan Adams	Bryan Adams and Jim Vallance	12-Feb-2013	3:21
Saturday Night's Alright for Fighting	Elton John	Elton John and Bernie Taupin	13-Feb-2013	3:43
Precious Time	Van Morrison	Van Morrison	14-Feb-2013	2:26
Stuck in the Middle with You	Stealers Wheel	Gerry Rafferty and Joe Egan	15-Feb-2013	3:11
Television	Bad Religion	Brett Gurewitz and Johnette Napolitano	16-Feb-2013	2:11
Just Another Town	Hank Williams Jr.	Hank Williams Jr.	17-Feb-2013	2:24
Alone With You	Faron Young	Faron Young, Lester Vanadore, Roy Drusky	18-Feb-2013	2:01
Little Rude Girl	Rancid, Lars Frederiksen and the Bastards	Tim Armstrong and Lars Frederiksen	19-Feb-2013	1:47
Little Sadie	traditional	traditional	20-Feb-2013	2:09
Let My Love Open the Door	Pete Townshend	Pete Townshend	21-Feb-2013	2:51
Brown Eyed Girl	Van Morrison	Van Morrison	22-Feb-2013	3:12
Guitar Polka	Rosalie Allen	Chet Atkins and Rosalie Allen	23-Feb-2013	2:25
Hard Travelin'	Woody Guthrie	Woody Guthrie	24-Feb-2013	2:48
Protest Song		Tim Armstrong	25-Feb-2013	3:10
Gentleman of the Road	Devils Brigade	Tim Armstrong and Matt Freeman	26-Feb-2013	3:01
Ain't No Good Time		Tim Armstrong and Dash Hutton	27-Feb-2013	3:14
Do What You Want, Do What You Can		Tim Armstrong and Dash Hutton	28-Feb-2013	2:42
Turntable	Rancid	Tim Armstrong	1-Mar-2013	2:29
Love is a Many Splendored Thing	AFI	AFI	2-Mar-2013	1:38
Rocks Off	Rolling Stones	Mick Jagger and Keith Richards	3-Mar-2013	3:27
Black Derby Jacket	Rancid	Tim Armstrong	4-Mar-2013	3:16
Abilene	Waylon Jennings	Bob Gibson and John D. Loudermilk	5-Mar-2013	2:05
No More Glow in the Moon	Charlie Feathers	Charlie Feathers, Stan Kesler, and Johnny Bernero	5-Mar-2013	2:02
Dope Sick Girl	Rancid	Tim Armstrong	6-Mar-2013	2:18
Oklahoma Hills	Woody Guthrie	Woody Guthrie	7-Mar-2013	2:47
Wild About You Baby	Elmore James	Elmore James	8-Mar-2013	3:20
Sittin' and Thinkin'	Charlie Rich	Charlie Rich	9-Mar-2013	3:09
Smoke Along the Track	Stonewall Jackson	Alan Rose	10-Mar-2013	3:10
Don't Waste Your Tears Over Me	Bill Neely	Bill Neely	11-Mar-2013	2:17
Olympia, WA	Rancid	Tim Armstrong	12-Mar-2013	3:47
The 11th Hour	Rancid	Tim Armstrong	13-Mar-2013	3:15
(Sittin' On) The Dock of the Bay	Otis Redding	Steve Cropper and Otis Redding	14-Mar-2013	2:45
To Have and to Have Not	Billy Bragg	Billy Bragg	15-Mar-2013	2:31
Rock This Joint	Jimmy Preston	Wendell "Don" Keane, Doc Bagby and Harry "Fats" Crafton	16-Mar-2013	2:40
Crazy Man Crazy	Bill Haley and His Comets	Bill Haley and Marshall Lytle	17-Mar-2013	2:41
Rockin' With the Clock	Shirley and Lee	Leonard Lee and Eddie Mesner	18-Mar-2013	2:41
Nothin' Shakin' But the Leaves On the Trees	Eddie Fontaine	Eddie Fontaine, Cirino Colacari, Diane Lampert, and Johnny Gluck	19-Mar-2013	3:10
Go Lil' Camaro Go	Ramones	Dee Dee Ramone	20-Mar-2013	2:11
Arrested in Shanghai	Rancid	Tim Armstrong and Lars Frederiksen	21-Mar-2013	3:41
Not to Regret	Rancid	Tim Armstrong	22-Mar-2013	2:41
Let Me Go	Rancid	Tim Armstrong	23-Mar-2013	3:01
GGF	Rancid	Tim Armstrong	24-Mar-2013	4:21
Tulare		Tim Armstrong	25-Mar-2013	2:29
Jim Dandy	Lavern Baker & the Gliders	Lincoln Chase	26-Mar-2013	4:21
On the Banks of the Old Ohio	traditional	traditional	27-Mar-2013	4:27
The Long Black Veil	Lefty Frizzell	Marijohn Wilkin and Danny Dill	28-Mar-2013	3:12
I Hold Your Hand in Mine	Tom Lehrer	Tom Lehrer	29-Mar-2013	1:46
Poor Edward	Tom Waits	Tom Waits and Kathleen Brennan	30-Mar-2013	2:31
Jockey Full of Bourbon	Tom Waits	Tom Waits	31-Mar-2013	2:41
Take Me Out to the Ball Game		Jack Norworth and Albert Von Tilzer	1-Apr-2013	0:41
Thirty Pieces of Version		Prince Buster	2-Apr-2013	2:40
Version for Tonight		Tim Armstrong	3-Apr-2013	3:10
This Time We Got Version		Tim Armstrong	4-Apr-2013	3:02
Version Ain't Gone		Tim Armstrong	5-Apr-2013	3:41
Version Roller		Tim Armstrong	6-Apr-2013	3:18
She's Drunk Version		Tim Armstrong and Kevin Bivona	7-Apr-2013	3:01
Livin' Version		Tim Armstrong	8-Apr-2013	2:51
Version Bread		Tim Armstrong and Jimmy Cliff	9-Apr-2013	3:30
Train 45	traditional	traditional	10-Apr-2013	2:20
Blue Skies		Irving Berlin	11-Apr-2013	2:11
Flying Saucer Rock 'N' Roll	Billy Lee Riley	Billy Lee Riley and Ray Scott	12-Apr-2013	2:01
Some of These Days	Shelton Brooks	Shelton Brooks	13-Apr-2013	3:20
Timebomb	Rancid	Tim Armstrong, Lars Frederiksen, and Matt Freeman	14-Apr-2013	3:10
St. James Infirmary	traditional	traditional	15-Apr-2013	2:17
Sadie Queen of the Northern Soul		Tim Armstrong	16-Apr-2013	2:51
Sentenced to Hell		Tim Armstrong	17-Apr-2013	2:51
Treacherous Retreats		Tim Armstrong	18-Apr-2013	1:40
Trouble Version	Tim Armstrong	Tim Armstrong and Pink	19-Apr-2013	3:20
Skeleton Version		Tim Armstrong	20-Apr-2013	2:07
Guardian Version		Tim Armstrong	21-Apr-2013	2:30
Sittin' on Top of the World	traditional	traditional	22-Apr-2013	2:31
Gunshot	Rancid	Tim Armstrong and Matt Freeman	23-Apr-2013	2:40
St. Louis Blues	W.C. Handy	W.C. Handy	24-Apr-2013	3:37
Fort Worth Jail	Dick Reinhart	The Bell Boys	25-Apr-2013	4:03
Dinah		Harry Akst, Joe Young, and Sam M. Lewis	26-Apr-2013	2:51
As Wicked	Rancid	Tim Armstrong, Matt Freeman and Lars Frederiksen	27-Apr-2013	3:31
Baby Let's Go to Mexico	Drops of Joy	Jimmy Liggins	28-Apr-2013	2:16
Train Kept a Rollin'	Tiny Bradshaw	Tiny Bradshaw	29-Apr-2013	2:18
Learn to Say Fuck You	Rancid	Tim Armstrong	30-Apr-2013	2:08
That's What's Knockin' Me Out	Drops of Joy	Jimmy Liggins	01-May-2013	2:16
When the Jukebox Plays	Eddie Bond	Eddie Bond	02-May-2013	2:30
Yes Sir		Andy Razaf and Edgar Dowell	03-May-2013	3:21
Hyena	Rancid	Tim Armstrong and Matt Freeman	04-May-2013	3:36
Antennas	Rancid	Tim Armstrong	05-May-2013	1:41
Version Is All We Know		Tim Armstrong	06-May-2013	2:21
Corazon De Oro	Rancid	Tim Armstrong	07-May-2013	3:54
Version What You Want		Tim Armstrong	08-May-2013	2:41
All We Wanna Hear is Version		Tim Armstrong	09-May-2013	2:08
Everything Version		Tim Armstrong	10-May-2013	2:11
Alright Version	Rancid	Tim Armstrong	11-May-2013	2:20
It's Quite Version	Rancid	Tim Armstrong	12-May-2013	1:46
Ruby Soho	Rancid	Tim Armstrong	13-May-2013	3:01
Peace At Any Price		Tim Armstrong	14-May-2013	2:16
Marked for Death		Tim Armstrong	15-May-2013	2:21
Till the Well Runs Dry	Wynona Carr	Wynona Carr	16-May-2013	2:16
You Nearly Lose Your Mind	Ernest Tubb	Ernest Tubb	17-May-2013	2:21
Detroit	Rancid	Tim Armstrong and Matt Freeman	18-May-2013	3:31
St. Mary	Rancid	Tim Armstrong and Matt Freeman	19-May-2013	2:26
Daydreamin'	Bud Deckleman	Bud Deckleman, Bill Cantrell, and Quinten Claunch	20-May-2013	3:11
Rock Around the World		Tim Armstrong	21-May-2013	1:34
Wake Up	Previous version on A Poet's Life	Tim Armstrong	22-May-2013	3:06
Old Friend	Rancid	Tim Armstrong, Lars Frederiksen and Matt Freeman	23-May-2013	3:41
Version Ram	Rancid	Tim Armstrong and Matt Freeman	24-May-2013	3:17
Unknown Version		Tim Armstrong, Lars Frederiksen and Matt Freeman	25-May-2013	3:06
Wicked Version		Tim Armstrong, Matt Freeman and Lars Frederiksen	26-May-2013	3:31
Star Spangled Version		Francis Scott Key and John Stafford Smith	27-May-2013	1:33
Pointed in the Right Version		Tim Armstrong	28-May-2013	1:41
Lion's Share Version	Rancid	Tim Armstrong and Matt Freeman	29-May-2013	3:37
Radicals Version	Rancid	Tim Armstrong, Matt Freeman and Lars Frederiksen	30-May-2013	2:54
If the Music Ain't Loud		Tim Armstrong, Reef The Lost Cauze, Kevin Bivona, Stress and Big Chris Hollosy	31-May-2013	3:09
Sidekick	Rancid	Tim Armstrong and Matt Freeman	01-Jun-2013	2:06
You Can't Catch Me	Chuck Berry	Chuck Berry	02-Jun-2013	3:09
Stay True		Tim Armstrong, Rich Quick, Kevin Bivona, Stress, Big Chris Hollosy	03-Jun-2013	3:17
Still Breaking the Law		Tim Armstrong, One Gold Tooth, DJ Stress, Kevin Bivona, Chris Hollosy	04-Jun-2013	3:51
Action Version		Tim Armstrong	05-Jun-2013	3:38
Version Mary	Rancid	Tim Armstrong, Matt Freeman and Lars Frederiksen	06-Jun-2013	2:21
We Belong Remix	Freddy Madball	Tim Armstrong, Freddy Madball, DJ Stress the Whiteboy	07-Jun-2013	2:58
Radio	Rancid	Tim Armstrong, Billie Joe Armstrong, Matt Freeman	08-Jun-2013	3:13
East Bay Night	Rancid	Tim Armstrong, and Matt Freeman	09-Jun-2013	2:21
Salvation	Rancid	Tim Armstrong, and Matt Freeman	10-Jun-2013	1:58
Journey to the End of the East Bay	Rancid	Tim Armstrong, Lars Frederiksen and Matt Freeman	11-Jun-2013	3:11
Fall Back Down	Rancid	Tim Armstrong and Lars Frederiksen	12-Jun-2013	3:37
Prisoners		Tim Armstrong, DJ Stress, Planetary and Crypt the Warchild	13-Jun-2013	3:05
Answer Version		Tim Armstrong and Dave Berg	14-Jun-2013	3:55
Disorder Version	Rancid	Tim Armstrong, Matt Freeman and Lars Frederiksen	15-Jun-2013	2:06
I'm Not the Only Version	Rancid	Tim Armstrong and Matt Freeman	16-Jun-2013	2:51
Sick Version	Rancid	Tim Armstrong and Matt Freeman	17-Jun-2013	2:17
City of Version		Tim Armstrong	18-Jun-2013	2:41
Thug Motivation		Side Effect, DJ Stress, Tim Armstrong	19-Jun-2013	4:24
The Devil is Loose Version		Tim Armstrong	20-Jun-2013	2:57
Post War America		Tim Armstrong	21-Jun-2013	2:36
Version Misconception		Tim Armstrong	22-Jun-2013	3:07
Time Version		Tim Armstrong	23-Jun-2013	1:41
Sheik of Araby		Harry B. Smith, Ted Snyder, Francis Wheeler	24-Jun-2013	3:31
Everybody's Singin' and Truckin'	The Modern Mountaineers	The Modern Mountaineers	25-Jun-2013	1:43
Be There		Tim Armstrong	26-Jun-2013	3:09
Los Angeles is Burning	Bad Religion	Brett Gurewitz	27-Jun-2013	3:21
Hang Out the Front Door Key	Benjamin Hapgood Burt	The Blue Sky Boys	28-Jun-2013	3:36
Corazon Version	Tim Armstrong		29-Jun-2013	3:54
Turntable Version	Tim Armstrong		30-Jun-2013	2:28
Arrested Version	Tim Armstrong and Lars Frederiksen		1-Jul-2013	3:48
Step Down	Sick of it All	Sick of it All	2-Jul-2013	2:54
Dance Dance Dance	Pearl McKinnon & The Deltars and The Kodaks	Pearl & The Deltars	3-Jul-2013	2:18
If You See Mary Lee	The Rainbows	The Rainbows	4-Jul-2013	2:42
Chills and Fever	B. Rakeo and B. Ness	Ronnie Love	5-Jul-2013	2:27
Vigilante Version	Tim Armstrong and Matt Freeman		6-Jul-2013	2:08
Do You Wanna Dance?	Bobby Freeman		7-Jul-2013	2:11
I Wanna Be Sedated	Joey Ramone	The Ramones	8-Jul-2013	2:51
Crawdad Hole Version	Traditional		9-Jul-2013	3:16
What You Got Version	Rancid	Tim Armstrong and Matt Freeman	10-Jul-2013	2:02
Version Through My Heart		Tim Armstrong and Matt Freeman	11-Jul-2013	2:41
Living In a Dangerous Land		Tim Armstrong and Jesse Michaels	12-Jul-2013	2:41
Choo Choo Version		Vaughn Horton, Denver Darling, and Milt Gabler	13-Jul-2013	2:53
Version Days		Shelton Brooks	14-Jul-2013	3:21
Sadie's Version		Tim Armstrong	15-Jul-2013	2:51
It's a Lonely Trail		Vaughn De Leath	16-Jul-2013	2:37
Clementina			17-Jul-2013	2:50
Journey Version		Tim Armstrong, Lars Frederiksen, Matt Freeman	18-Jul-2013	3:11
Don't You Lie to Me		Fats Domino and Tampa Red aka Hudson Whitaker	19-Jul-2013	2:21
She Goes to Finos Version		Michael "Olga" Algar	20-Jul-2013	2:48
Alcohol Version		Charged GBH	21-Jul-2013	2:41
Back Down Back Up Version		Tim Armstrong and Lars Frederiksen	22-Jul-2013	3:36
Nihilism	Rancid	Tim Armstrong and Matt Freeman	23-Jul-2013	2:03
I'm Moving On Version		Hank Snow	24-Jul-2013	2:52
Good Morning Heartache You're Like a Version		Tim Armstrong, Lars Frederiksen, Matt Freeman	25-Jul-2013	3:48
80,000 Miles of Version		Tim Armstrong	26-Jul-2013	1:58
The Sentence	Rancid		27-Jul-2013	1:51
Version Break Up		Tim Armstrong, Dash Hutton	28-Jul-2013	3:22
Black Derby Version		Tim Armstrong	29-Jul-2013	3:16
On a Night Like This	Bob Dylan	Bob Dylan	30-Jul-2013	3:11
Everyday Gets Worse Version		Tim Armstrong	31-Jul-2013	2:23
Brown Eyed Version	Van Morrison	Van Morrison	1-Aug-2013	3:11
In the City Version	The Jam	Paul Weller	2-Aug-2013	2:23
Long Black Version	Lefty Frizzell	Marijohn Wilkin and Danny Dill	3-Aug-2013	3:10
Swallow My Pride Version	The Ramones		4-Aug-2013	2:41
Saturday Night Version		Barry Mann and Cynthia Weil	5-Aug-2013	3:01
In the Dew and Rain	Errol Duke	Errol Duke	6-Aug-2013	2:31
Down the Road	Neville Marcano	Neville Marcano	7-Aug-2013	2:28
Too Much Pressure Version	The Selecter	Neol Davies	8-Aug-2013	3:22
Lip Up Fatty Version	Bad Manners	Bad Manners	9-Aug-2013	2:51
Rock This Joint Version		Doc Bagby and Harry "Fats" Crafton	10-Aug-2013	2:41
Flying Saucer Rock 'n' Roll Version		Billy Lee Riley and Ray Scott	11-Aug-2013	1:58
St. James Infirmary Version			12-Aug-2013	2:21
Blue Skies Version		Irving Berlin	13-Aug-2013	2:11
How Will I Know	The Strands	C.W. Burcham	14-Aug-2013	2:36
Let's Do Rocksteady Version	The Bodysnatchers	The Bodysnatchers	15-Aug-2013	2:58
Be Yourself	The Companions	W. Hamilton, L.C. Scott	16-Aug-2013	2:12
Ammerette	Benny Spellman		17-Aug-2013	2:06
Thrill Me	The Mello-Kings	Lewis Gensler	18-Aug-2013	2:37
Going Down That Road Version	Ersel Hickey	Ersel Hickey	19-Aug-2013	1:49
Cabin on the Hill Version	Published in 1943 in James D. Vaughn songbook company's book Sacred Thoughts	Bolivar Lee Shook	20-Aug-2013	2:36
Dance Dance Dance Version	Pearl McKinnon & The Deltars and The Kodaks	Pearl & The Deltars	21-Aug-2013	2:21
Chills and Fever Version	B. Rakeo and B. Ness	Ronnie Love	22-Aug-2013	2:26
Mary Lee Version	The Rainbows	The Rainbows	23-Aug-2013	2:41
That's What's Knockin Me Out Version	Drops of Joy	Jimmy Liggins	24-Aug-2013	2:16
When the Jukebox Plays Version	Eddie Bond	Eddie Bond	25-Aug-2013	2:32
When I Got The Version	Rancid	Tim Armstrong, Billie Joe Armstrong, Matt Freeman	26-Aug-2013	3:11
East Bay Version		Tim Armstrong and Matt Freeman	27-Aug-2013	2:17
Nihilism Version		Tim Armstrong and Matt Freeman	28-Aug-2013	2:03
The Sentence Version			29-Aug-2013	1:52
Be Yourself Version		W. Hamilton and L.C. Scott	30-Aug-2013	2:12
Don't You Lie to Me Version		Fats Domino and Tampa Red	31-Aug-2013	2:25
Just Another Town Version		Hank Williams Jr.	01-Sep-2013	2:27
Thanks a Lot Version		Eddie Miller and John Sessions	02-Sep-2013	2:41
Fort Worth Jail Version		Dick Reinhart	03-Sep-2013	4:04
Let My Love Open the Door Version		Pete Townshend	04-Sep-2013	2:51
Texas Tornado Version		Doug Sahm	05-Sep-2013	3:02
Dark As a Dungeon Version		Merle Travis	06-Sep-2013	2:21
Living in a Dangerous Land Version		Tim Armstrong and Jesse Michaels	07-Sep-2013	2:37
Ammerette Version		Benny Spellman	08-Sep-2013	2:07
Jim Dandy Version		Lincoln Chase	09-Sep-2013	2:46
In the Dew and the Rain Version		Errol Duke	10-Sep-2013	2:31
Baby Let's Go to Mexico Version		J.M. Perez and J.P. Perez	11-Sep-2013	3:02
Sitting on the Dock of the Bay Version		Steve Cropper and Otis Redding	12-Sep-2013	2:51
I Wanna Be Sedated Version		Joey Ramone	13-Sep-2013	2:51
To Have and to Have Not Version		Billy Bragg	14-Sep-2013	2:31
On the Banks of the Old Ohio Version		traditional	15-Sep-2013	4:30
How Will I Know Version		C.W. Burcham	16-Sep-2013	2:59
Let Me Go Version		Tim Armstrong	17-Sep-2013	3:02
Clementina Version		traditional	18-Sep-2013	2:51
Thrill Me Version		R. Levister	19-Sep-2013	2:41
I Hold Your Hand In Mine Version		Tom Lehrer	20-Sep-2013	1:44
Adalida Version			21-Sep-2013	3:43
Night Owl Version			22-Sep-2013	3:01
It Rains Rain Version		Pete Stamper	23-Sep-2013	2:41
I'll Do It Every Time Version		Johnny Horton	24-Sep-2013	2:26
King of the Jungle Version		Roi Pearce and Arthur Kitchener	25-Sep-2013	3:43
Lodi Version		John Fogerty	26-Sep-2013	3:21
Bye Bye Love Version		Boudleaux Bryant and Felice Bryant	27-Sep-2013	2:16
Rockin' With the Clock Version		Leonard Lee and Eddie Mesner	28-Sep-2013	2:42
Nothin Shakin but the Leaves on the Trees Version		Eddie Fontaine, Cirino Colacari, Diane Lampert and Johnny Gluck	29-Sep-2013	3:15
Protest Song Version		Tim Armstrong	30-Sep-2013	3:11
Stuck in the Middle With You Version		Gerry Rafferty and Joe Egan	01-Oct-2013	3:31
When It's Springtime in Alaska Version		Johnny Horton and Tillman Franks	02-Oct-2013	2:55
Working Version		Cock Sparrer	03-Oct-2013	2:48
Buckets of Rain Version			04-Oct-2013	3:11
Bob Version		Fat Mike	05-Oct-2013	2:03
Save it for Later Version			06-Oct-2013	3:26
I'm Going Down Version			07-Oct-2013	3:35
If the Kids Are United Version		Jimmy Pursey and Dave Guy Parsons	08-Oct-2013	2:48
Abilene Version		John David Loudermilk and Bob Gibson	09-Oct-2013	2:12
Heaven Only Knows Version			10-Oct-2013	1:55
Little Rude Girl Version		Tim Armstrong and Lars Frederiksen	11-Oct-2013	1:47
I'm Just Here to Get My Baby Out of Jail Version		Harty Taylor and Karl Davis	12-Oct-2013	3:12
Saturday Night's Alright for Fighting Version		Elton John and Bernie Taupin	13-Oct-2013	3:51
Precious Time Version		Van Morrison	14-Oct-2013	2:31
Hard Travelin' Version		Woody Guthrie	15-Oct-2013	2:51
From Bad to Worse Version		Leonard Dillon	16-Oct-2013	2:34
Gentleman of the Road Version		Tim Armstrong & Matt Freeman	17-Oct-2013	3:05
Crazy Man Crazy Version			18-Oct-2013	2:44
It's So Easy Version			19-Oct-2013	2:11
Ooh La La Version			20-Oct-2013	3:51
Poison Version			21-Oct-2013	1:26
Los Angeles Is Burning Version	Bad Religion	Brett Gurewitz	22-Oct-2013	3:21
Little Sadie Version			23-Oct-2013	2:11
Sittin' and Thinkin' Version			24-Oct-2013	3:11
Wild About You Baby Version			25-Oct-2013	3:21
Rocks Off Version			26-Oct-2013	3:29
Go Lil Camaro Go Version			27-Oct-2013	2:15
Down The Road Version			28-Oct-2013	2:31
Drink Up And Go Home	performed by Tim Armstrong & Street Dogs			
-				

== Recording personnel ==
- Tim Armstrong – Lead vocals, lead & rhythm & acoustic guitar
- Lars Fredriksen – Lead & rhythm guitar, backing vocals
- Matt Freeman – Bass guitar, mandolin, double bass, backing vocals
- Branden Steineckert – Drums, backing vocals
- Ryan Foltz – Mandolin, percussion, melodica, concertina, bass guitar, drums, horns, backing vocals
- Kevin Bivona – Guitar, farfisa organ, piano, glockenspiel, B3 organ, bass guitar, accordion, percussion, mandolin, melodica, keyboard, backing vocals, stick bass
- Travis Barker – Drums
- Aimee Interrupter – Backing vocals
- J Bonner – Bass guitar, organ, guitar, piano
- Justin Bivona – Bass guitar, B3 organ, piano, backing vocals
- Jesse Bivona – Drums, percussion, backing vocals, guitar
- Ben Lythberg – Percussion
- Dan Boer – B3 organ
- Pablo Calagero – Saxophone
- Tim Hutton – Bass guitar
- Dash Hutton – Drums, percussion
- Jordis Unga – Whistle, backing vocals
- Mark Bush – Trumpet
- Ruben Duranz – Trombone
- Robby Spengler – Tenor saxophone
- Tommy King – B3 organ
- John Morrical – Guitar, piano, backing vocals
- Dave McKean – Drums, backing vocals
- Doug McKean – Bass guitar, guitar
- Austin "walkin' cane" Charnanghat – Guitar, resonator guitar
- Justin Gorski – Keyboard
- Liz Kelly – Backing vocals
- James Doyle – Drums
- Brett Simons – Bass guitar
- Hunter Perrin – Guitar
- Jamie T – Backing vocals
- Doug Livingston – Pedal steel guitar
- Craig Eastman – Fiddle
- James King – Saxophone, flute
- Jason Myers – Guitar
- Patrick Frenchie French – Harmonica
- Mark Switzer – Banjo
- Becky Stark- Backing vocals
- Chris Yohn – Fiddle
- Dave Brophy – Drums
- Joe McMahon – Bass guitar
- Rusty Scott – Piano
- Mike Mele – Guitar
- John Aruda -Saxophone
- Scott Aruda – Trumpet
- Jeff Gallindo – Trombone
- Brandon Intelligator – Pedal steel guitar
- Scott Abels – Drums
- Zack Meyerowitz – Trumpet
- Nigel Yancey – Saxophone
- Korey Horn – Drums
- Bevin Hamilton – Backing vocals
- Beardo - Bass guitar
- Tamir Barzilay- Drums
- Darian Polach – Guitar
- Ted Russel Kamp – Bass guitar
- Dani Llamas – Guitar, backing vocals
- Paco Loco – Guitar, piano, keyboard
- Pakomoto – Bass guitar
- Pablo Minor Boy – Guitar
- Salina Cano – Percussion
- Jason cool breeze Castillo – Drums
- Ruben Durazo – Trombone
- Robbie Spengler – Saxophone
- Rafa Camison – Drums, percussion
- Jeff Moran – Banjo, bass guitar
- Patrick Morrison – Guitar
- Carlos Reynoso – Washboard, acoustic guitar
- Dominique Rodriguez – Drum/cymbal/block
- Brandon Armstrong – Sousaphone
- Justin Rubenstein – Trombone
- Charles De Castro – Trumpet
- Josh Kaufman – Clarinet, piano
- Anders Mouridsen – Accordion, banjo, guitar, gang vocals, Dobro, mandolin
- Kate Strand – Backing vocals
- Mike Bolger – Accordion
- Zeke – Barking
- Sheena – Barking

== Touring personnel ==
- Tim Armstrong – lead vocals, lead guitar
- Elvis Cortez – guitar, vocals
- Kevin Bivona – guitar, B3 organ, piano, vocals
- Justin Bivona – bass, vocals
- Jesse Bivona – drums, vocals
- Mark Bush – trumpet, vocals
- Ruben Durazo – trombone, vocals
