= Let the Dominoes Fall =

Studio album by Rancid
- Released: June 1, 2009 (Europe)
- Recorded: January 2008 – February 2009
- Studios: Skywalker Sound; Sound City Studios; Joe's House of Compression; Bloodclot Studios
- Genres: Punk rock; ska punk
- Length: 45:29
- Labels: Hellcat; Epitaph
- Producers: Brett Gurewitz; Ryan Foltz

Rancid chronology
B Sides and C Sides (2007)	Let the Dominoes Fall (2009)	Honor Is All We Know (2014)

Singles from Let the Dominoes Fall
- 1. "Last One to Die" Released: April 7, 2009

Let the Dominoes Fall is the seventh studio album by the American punk rock band Rancid, released in Europe on June 1, 2009, and in the US on June 2, 2009 by Hellcat/Epitaph. It was their first album of new material in nearly six years, following 2003's Indestructible, and their first with drummer Branden Steineckert, who joined the band in 2006 after the departure of founding drummer Brett Reed.

The band had begun working on new material after their temporary hiatus in 2004, but showed no signs of a new album until January 2008, when they announced that they had begun recording with producer and Bad Religion guitarist Brett Gurewitz. The writing and recording process was finally finished in February 2009.

== Background and composition ==
Following the release of Indestructible in 2003, the group became dormant with each of the members either touring or releasing albums with other bands. After a break in 2004, Rancid began writing their follow-up to Indestructible a year later. In November 2005, it was announced that the band had begun working on a "large amount of new material" for the album and guitarist Lars Frederiksen mentioned that it would surface sometime in 2006. On April 13, 2006, Rancid posted a long update to their MySpace page and mentioned that the album would be released in the spring of 2007.

For sometime later, it was announced that the release date had been changed to summer/fall 2007, despite frontman Tim Armstrong's solo tour schedule, supporting his first album A Poet's Life. On November 3, it was announced that drummer Brett Reed left the band. His position was filled in by Branden Steineckert, formerly of The Used. Alternative Press mentioned that the group was going to record a new album in early 2007, with a projected mid-2007 release date. On June 12, 2007, Steineckert posted on his MySpace blog stating that members of Rancid were expected to get back together in the fall to begin writing the album, then resume recording it in January 2008. In December of that year, it was reported that Rancid had finished writing the album.

== Recording ==
Recording of the album at Skywalker Sound began in January 2008. The album was completed in early February 2009. The album is the band's fourth with producer Gurewitz, who previously worked with the band on Let's Go, their self-titled 2000 album, and the previous album, Indestructible.

Some known tracks left off the album include "Darlene'", which was reworked on the self-titled album by Devils Brigade, "Just For Tonight", which was reworked for Tim Armstrong's Sings RocknRoll Theater album, and the electric version of "The Highway".

== Release ==
On March 30, 2009, Let the Dominoes Fall was announced for release in three months' time; the following day, the track listing and artwork were posted online. "Last One to Die" was made available for streaming on April 7, 2009, via the band's Myspace page. From late April 2009, until the album's release, the band posted several making-of videos online. On May 12, 2009, a music video was released for "Last One to Die". A week later, "East Bay Night" was posted on Myspace. Shortly after this, the band performed at the KROQ Weenie Roast. Let the Dominoes Fall was made available for streaming on May 26 on their Myspace, before being released on June 2 through Hellcat Records. "Up to No Good" was released as the album's second single. A deluxe edition of the album was released which included a bonus CD of the entire album in acoustic form, and a DVD featuring a documentary about the making of the album. On June 10, 2009, the band appeared on The Tonight Show with Conan O'Brien, performing "Last One to Die". In June and July, the band supported Rise Against on their headlining tour of the US. On October 12, 2009, a music video was released for "Up to No Good".

== Reception ==
Professional ratings
Review scores
Source	Rating
AllMusic	3.5/5 stars
IGN	8.8/10
Robert Christgau	(2-star Honorable Mention)
Kerrang!	2/5 stars
Rock Sound	7/10
Rolling Stone	3.5/5 stars
Spin	3.5/5 stars

It debuted at number 11 on the Billboard 200, making it Rancid's highest-charting album to date.

Jim Kaz of IGN gave the album a 8.8/10 stating "it's refreshing to see seasoned vets like Rancid back on the scene to show the new kids how it's done. Rather than merely resting on its considerable laurels, the band continues to cross boundaries, genres and scenes, all while retaining its punk core. Let The Dominoes Fall is full testament to that." Tim Sendra of AllMusic wrote "2009's Let the Dominos Fall, was released a full six years after Indestructible. In that time much changed in the world (and the band swapped drummers, with Branden Steineckert stepping in for Brett Reed) but not a whole lot changed with the band's sound. Sure, there were a few cosmetic differences here and there but the fire, spirit, and strength the band exhibited since their debut in the early '90s hasn't faded at all."

== Track listing ==
All tracks are written by Rancid, except where noted.

No.	Title	Lead vocals	Length
1.	"East Bay Night"	Armstrong	2:05
2.	"This Place"	Armstrong	1:03
3.	"Up to No Good" (Rancid, Brett Gurewitz)	Armstrong	2:40
4.	"Last One to Die"	Armstrong	2:23
5.	"Disconnected"	Armstrong, Frederiksen, Freeman	2:00
6.	"I Ain't Worried"	Armstrong, Frederiksen, Freeman	2:36
7.	"Damnation"	Armstrong	1:30
8.	"New Orleans"	Frederiksen	3:04
9.	"Civilian Ways"	Armstrong	4:11
10.	"The Bravest Kids"	Armstrong	1:36
11.	"Skull City"	Armstrong	2:51
12.	"LA River"	Freeman	2:35
13.	"Lulu"	Armstrong	2:11
14.	"Dominoes Fall"	Armstrong	2:43
15.	"Liberty and Freedom"	Armstrong	2:45
16.	"You Want It, You Got It"	Armstrong, Frederiksen, Freeman	1:36
17.	"Locomotive"	Armstrong	1:38
18.	"That's Just the Way It Is Now"	Armstrong	2:52
19.	"The Highway"	Armstrong	3:10
Total length:			45:29

=== Bonus tracks ===
iTunes version
No.	Title	Length
20.	"Oil and Opium"	1:49

Japanese edition
No.	Title	Length
20.	"Outgunned" (electric version)	2:13

Japanese edition version 2
No.	Title	Length
20.	"Outgunned" (electric version)	2:13
21.	"Oil and Opium"	1:49

=== Expanded version ===
A version of the album was released on CD with a second disc of acoustic versions of songs from the album. These songs are also included in expanded editions of the album at digital download stores such as the iTunes Store and Amazon MP3. Note that all the songs here are acoustic. Not all songs were made into acoustic versions. The expanded version's third disc is a full-length DVD of the making of Let the Dominoes Fall.

Disc two

Let the Dominoes Fall Acoustic
No.	Title	Length
1.	"East Bay Night"	2:07
2.	"LA River"	2:43
3.	"I Ain't Worried"	2:44
4.	"This Place"	1:03
5.	"Disconnected"	1:53
6.	"Liberty and Freedom"	3:04
7.	"Dominoes Fall"	2:54
8.	"New Orleans"	2:48
9.	"You Want It, You Got It"	2:12
10.	"Outgunned"	2:16
11.	"The Bravest Kids"	1:34
12.	"Last One To Die"	2:18
Total length:		27:36

Disc three

Let the Dominoes Fall – The Making of the Seventh Record DVD
No.	Title	Length
1.	"The Making of the Seventh Record"	37:25

== Personnel ==
Adapted from the album's liner notes.

=== Rancid ===
- Tim Armstrong – guitar, vocals
- Lars Frederiksen – guitar, vocals
- Matt Freeman – bass, vocals
- Branden Steineckert – drums

=== Additional musicians ===
- Michael Bolger – horns on "Up to No Good"
- Ryan Foltz – mandolin on "Civilian Ways"
- Greg Graffin – gang vocals on "Damnation"
- Brett Gurewitz – background vocals, percussion
- Booker T. Jones – keyboards on "Up to No Good"
- Tom Lea – viola on "Up to No Good"
- Joel Pargman – violin on "Up to No Good"
- Vic Ruggiero – keyboards
- Jay Terrien – string arrangement on "Up to No Good"
- Ina Veli – violin on "Up to No Good"
- Pat Wilson – gang vocals on "Damnation"
- Adrienne Woods – cello on "Up to No Good"

=== Technical ===
- Brett Gurewitz – producer (1–8, 10–19), mixing (2–8, 10–17, 19)
- Ryan Foltz – producer, engineer (9)
- John Morrical – engineer, mixing (1, 9, 18)
- Pete Martinez – engineer (1–8, 10–19)
- Dan Tompson – assistant engineer (1–8, 10–19)
- Dave Natale – assistant engineer (1–8, 10–19)
- Tim Armstrong – mixing (1, 18)
- Bob Ludwig – mastering
- Nick Pritchard – design, layout
- Mitch Ikeda – cover photography
- Rob Naples – additional photography

=== Let the Dominoes Fall Acoustic ===
Additional musicians

- Matt Hensley – accordion, banjo
- Patrick French – harmonica
- Robert Hoehn – accordion
- Mark Switzer – banjo
- Justin Gorski – piano, accordion

Technical

- Brett Gurewitz – producer
- Ryan Foltz – producer, engineer
- John Morrical – engineer, mixing
- Pete Martinez – engineer
- Tim Armstrong – mixing
- Gene Grimaldi – mastering
- Recorded at Sound City, Bloodclot, Cleveland Audio and random hotel rooms across the US

=== The Making of the Seventh Record DVD ===
Technical

- Rachel Tejada – direction, filming, editing
- Rob Naples – additional filming
- Paul Hackner – post production sound
- Kent Road Productions – post production sound
- Jithu Aravamudhen – rerecording mixing
- Ryan Gegenheimer – rerecording mixing
- Christopher Kirk – opening titles, motion graphic

== Charts ==
Chart (2009)	Peak position
Australian Albums (ARIA)	31
Canadian Albums (Billboard)	7
Finnish Albums (Suomen virallinen lista)	29
French Albums (SNEP)	165
German Albums (Offizielle Top 100)	48
New Zealand Albums (RMNZ)	31
Norwegian Albums (VG-lista)	26
Swedish Albums (Sverigetopplistan)	27
Swiss Albums (Schweizer Hitparade)	75
Scottish Albums (OCC)	43
UK Albums (OCC)	41
UK Album Downloads (OCC)	97
UK Physical Albums (OCC)	41
UK Rock & Metal Albums (OCC)	2
UK Independent Albums (OCC)	42
US Billboard 200	11
US Top Rock Albums (Billboard)	6
Top Rock & Alternative Albums (Billboard)	6
US Independent Albums (Billboard)	2
US Vinyl Albums chart	9
