= The Devil's Brigade =

The Devil's Brigade, Devil's Brigade, or Devils Brigade may refer to:

- The Devil's Brigade, a nickname for the First Special Service Force, a joint Canadian–US commando unit that formed during World War II
- The Devil's Brigade (film), a 1968 film about the First Special Service Force
- Devils Brigade (band), an American rock band
- Devils Brigade (album), a 2010 album by the band
- "Devils Brigade", a song on the 1999 album The Gang's All Here by the Dropkick Murphys
- The Devil's Brigade (comics), a former comics series by Charlton Comics
- Devil's Brigade, a Canadian television series produced by Frantic Films
