= B Sides and C Sides =

Compilation album by Rancid
- Released: December 11, 2007
- Recorded: 1992–2004
- Genre: Punk rock; ska punk
- Length: 45:18
- Label: Rancid
- Producer: Rancid; Brett Gurewitz; Tim Armstrong; Lars Frederiksen; Donnell Cameron; Andy Ernst; Jerry Finn

Rancid chronology
Indestructible (2003)	B Sides and C Sides (2007)	Let the Dominoes Fall (2009)

Professional ratings
Review scores
Source	Rating
AbsolutePunk	(63%)

B Sides and C Sides is a compilation album by the American punk rock band Rancid. It was first released online on December 11, 2007, followed by a standard release on January 15, 2008. It contains a number of B-sides and rare songs as well as compilation or soundtrack appearances plus 4 previously unreleased songs. The set spans from 1992 to 2004, therefore it doesn't include any songs recorded with current drummer Branden Steineckert.

B Sides and C Sides is also notable as being the band's first release since their hiatus in 2004, along with their seventh album Let the Dominoes Fall, which was released on June 2, 2009.

== Track listing ==
All tracks are written by Rancid.

No.	Title	Original appearance	Length
1.	"Ben Zanotto"	B side of the "Let Me Go" single (2000)	2:02
2.	"Stop"	B side of the "Bloodclot" single (1998)	1:41
3.	"Devils Dance"	Previously Unreleased. Record During LWW Sessions.	3:04
4.	"Dead and Gone"	B side of the "Let Me Go" single (2000)	2:06
5.	"Stranded"	B side of the "Fall Back Down" single (2003)	2:24
6.	"Killing Zone"	Bonus track on the vinyl version of Indestructible, B side of the "Fall Back Down" single (2003)	2:39
7.	"100 Years"	Previously Unreleased. Record During LWW Sessions.	1:56
8.	"Things to Come"	B side on the "Hooligans" single (1998)	3:09
9.	"Blast 'Em"	B side on the "Time Bomb" single (1995), Bored Generation compilation on Epitaph Records (1996)	2:29
10.	"Endrina"	B side of the "Bloodclot" single (1998)	1:14
11.	"White Knuckle Ride"	"Old Skars & Upstarts" compilation on Disaster Records (1999)	1:24
12.	"Sick Sick World"	Japanese version of Rancid (2000), Warped Tour Compilation (2001), "Sick Sick World" 12-inch single on Rancid Records (2003)	1:16
13.	"Tattoo"	Soundtrack album to Taylor Steele's surf movie The Show on Theologian Records (1998)	2:06
14.	"That's Entertainment"	B side on the "Ruby Soho" single (1995)	1:29
15.	"Clockwork Orange"	Previously Unreleased. Record During LWW Sessions.	2:45
16.	"The Brothels"	Give 'Em the Boot compilation (1997)	2:57
17.	"Just a Feeling"	Radio Radio Radio EP (1993), Fat Music for Fat People compilation (1994)	1:57
18.	"Brixton" (missing verse from original version)	Rock Stars Kill compilation on Kill Rock Stars Records (1994)	2:25
19.	"Empros Lap Dog"	Previously Unreleased. Record During LWW Sessions.	1:54
20.	"I Wanna Riot"	Punk-O-Rama Vol. 1 compilation (1994), B side of the "Roots Radicals" single (1995)	3:06
21.	"Kill the Lights"	Old Skars & Upstarts compilation on Disaster Records (1999)	1:18

Japanese/Tour version/Pirates Press - Rancid essentials 7x7" pack / Import bonus tracks (all originally appeared on the Rancid vinyl EP on Lookout! Records in 1992)
No.	Title	Length
22.	"I'm Not the Only One"	2:51
23.	"Battering Ram"	2:58
24.	"The Sentence"	1:39
25.	"Media Controller"	1:58
26.	"Idol Hands"	2:02

Double LP Vinyl release
No.	Title	Length
22.	"Blacklisted"
23.	"X-Mas Eve (She Got Up And Left Me)"
24.	"Fuck You"

== Personnel ==
- Tim Armstrong – vocals, guitar
- Lars Frederiksen – vocals, guitar
- Matt Freeman – vocals, bass
- Brett Reed – drums
