= Devils Brigade (album) =

2010 studio album by Devils Brigade

Studio album by Devils Brigade
- Released: August 30, 2010 (EU); August 31, 2010 (US)
- Recorded: 2010
- Studio: Sunset Lodge (Hollywood, CA); Cleveland Audio (Cleveland, Ohio)
- Genre: Punk rock; psychobilly
- Length: 28:17
- Label: Hellcat
- Producer: Tim Armstrong; Ryan Foltz

Devils Brigade is the debut album by the rock band Devils Brigade, a side project by Matt Freeman of Rancid. The band, which performs a mix of punk rock and psychobilly, features Freeman on lead vocals and double bass in contrast to the backing vocals and bass guitar he typically performs in Rancid (though he still plays bass guitar on select tracks). Originally envisioned as a concept album about the construction of the Golden Gate Bridge, Devils Brigade was co-written by Freeman and his longtime bandmate Tim Armstrong, who also played guitar on the album and served as record producer alongside Ryan Foltz. The album also features X drummer DJ Bonebrake and contributions from Rancid's Lars Frederiksen, and was released August 31, 2010 through Armstrong's label Hellcat Records.

The album peaked at number 21 on the Billboard Heatseekers Albums.

== Background and recording ==
Freeman started Devils Brigade in 2000 when he and Armstrong began writing songs together during breaks between Rancid tours. Backed by Armstrong on guitar and Rancid drummer Brett Reed, he debuted the project in 2002 with the song "Vampire Girl" on the compilation album Give 'Em the Boot III. He continued to work on Devils Brigade in between tours supporting Rancid's 2003 album Indestructible, releasing two singles in 2003 and 2005.

Following tours in support of Rancid's 2009 album Let the Dominoes Fall, Freeman revived Devils Brigade to record a full-length album. It was originally envisioned as a concept album based on an idea of Armstrong's for a musical about the construction of the Golden Gate Bridge, titled Half Way to Hell Club after the informal fraternity of nineteen steelworkers who were caught by safety netting strung below the construction site, saving them from what would have otherwise been fatal falls into the bay below. "We grew up in the East Bay looking at that bridge and it has always been a part of our lives", said Freeman. Armstrong co-wrote the album with Freeman, with six of the twelve tracks—including "Bridge of Gold" and "Half Way to Hell"—originating from the Golden Gate Bridge concept while the remaining six—including "Ride Harley" and "Vampire Girl"—were new recordings of tracks from the first Devils Brigade demo.

Devils Brigade was recorded in early 2010 at Sunset Lodge in Hollywood and Cleveland Audio in Cleveland, with additional recording conducted at Rancid's Bloodclot studio. It was produced by Armstrong, who also played guitar on the album and sang lead vocals on "Gentleman of the Road", and by Ryan Foltz who also played mandolin. Drums were played by DJ Bonebrake of X and The Knitters, who had previously played with Freeman in Auntie Christ. "It was a great vibe in the studio," said Freeman, "The record has a real live and loose vibe. Loose in a good way. Tim's guitar style blended really well with DJ and everything clicked very quickly." Lars Frederiksen of Rancid also contributed to two tracks: "Darlene", which he co-wrote, and "Bridge of Gold", on which he, Armstrong, and Freeman took turns singing the verses.

Devils Brigade was released August 31, 2010 through Armstrong's Hellcat Records label. The band supported the album with a tour of the United States opening for Street Dogs through October 2010.

The faster, original version of Darlene was originally recorded for Rancid's Let The Dominoes Fall. You can hear part of the track during the documentary on the making of the record.

== Reception ==
Professional ratings
Review scores
Source	Rating
Allmusic	3/5 stars
Alternative Press	4/5 stars
Eye Weekly	2/5 stars
Punknews.org	3.5/5 stars

Critics' reviews of Devils Brigade have generally praised its mix of musical styles while criticizing its working-class lyrical themes. Jason Lymangrover of AllMusic noted Freeman's "gruff Gene Simmons-esque growl", the surf rock influences on "Ride Harley", and the bluegrass approach to "Bridge of Gold". He concluded that the album was "a far cry from the straightforward modern-day punk of Rancid, but open-minded fans of the band may find the tumbleweed twist from the norm enticing." Chris Parker of Alternative Press remarked that Freeman "sounds refreshed by the change of scenery", and that though the album at times borders on Rancid's punk rock sound, "Freeman takes advantage of the novelty to explore new territory, from rambunctious barrelhouse folk-punk ('Bridge of Gold') to throttling psychobilly ('Vampire Girl'), jazzy folk-swing ('Gentleman of the Road'), infectious old-school rock rave-ups ('Protest Song'), and reverb-drenched numbers biting Ennio Morricone ('Ride Harley'). While Freeman's gruff vocal delivery is still very punk rock, the overwhelming success of these dozen tracks is due to the effortless eclecticism of their gritty underclass portraits."

Criticism of the album has focused primarily on its lyrics. Joe Pelone of Punknews.org complained that the themes of working-class problems and motorcycles were very niche and had replaced the band's earlier, more kitschy material; he cited "Vampire Girl" as one of the band's best tracks while remarking that "sadly, the other songs aren't as gleefully macabre". He described the album's lyrics as being "pretty in keeping with the late-period Rancid of Let the Dominoes Fall, just with fewer references to being from the East Bay or whatever and more instances of roots rock", and complained that "some of the songs are pretty terrible—'Protest Song' is got-damn [sic] cheesy with its celebration of 'the working man / the blue collar man / he’s a fighting man'; the lyrics are wanting." He noted, however, that "the music still serves up delicious slices of psychobilly" and that "this record sounds like a group of friends having fun." Adam Steel of Eye Weekly gave Devils Brigade a negative review, saying that "Guitarist Armstrong, who seems to join and/or invent a new group every year, is just as disappointing in Brigade as his venture into Crazy Town–territory with the Transplants". He criticized the album's "lack of consistency and overly complicated sounds" as well as Freeman's singing, remarking that "The disc never strays far from loud, crunchy guitars, but the vocals are too similar to that signature Rancid yell-scream delivery, sounding comical on tracks that feature banjo and upright bass".

== Track listing ==
All tracks are written by Tim Armstrong and Matt Freeman, except where noted.

No.	Title	Length
1.	"I'm Movin Through"	1:53
2.	"My Own Man Now"	1:56
3.	"Shakedown"	2:14
4.	"Bridge of Gold"	2:20
5.	"Darlene" (Armstrong, Lars Frederiksen, Freeman)	2:02
6.	"Ride Harley"	3:29
7.	"Who's Gonna Save You Now"	1:43
8.	"Desperate Times"	1:37
9.	"Vampire Girl"	2:15
10.	"Gentleman of the Road"	3:07
11.	"Protest Song" (Armstrong)	3:05
12.	"Half Way to Hell"	2:36
Total length:		28:17

== Personnel ==
Credits adopted from CD insert

- Matt Freeman – double bass, guitars, lead and backing vocals, bass guitar on "My Own Man Now" and "Protest Song", back cover photo
- Tim Armstrong – guitars, backing vocals, lead vocals on "Bridge of Gold" and "Gentleman of the Road", producer
- DJ Bonebrake – drums, percussion, vibraslap
- Lars Frederiksen – lead vocals on "Bridge of Gold"
- Ryan Foltz – producer, recording engineer, mandolin
- Professor Fonz – banjo
- Justin Gorski – keyboards
- Chris Rakestraw – additional engineer
- Kevin Bivona – additional engineer
- John Morrical – additional engineer
- Rob Naples – cover photo
- Nick Pritchard – art and design
