= Rancid (EP) =

EP by Rancid
- Released: January 1992
- Studio: Art of Ears Studios in San Francisco, California
- Genre: Punk rock
- Length: 11:17
- Label: Lookout!
- Producer: Andy Ernst

Rancid chronology
Rancid (1992)	Rancid (1993)

Rancid is the eponymously titled debut extended play by the American punk rock band Rancid. It was released in January 1992 through Lookout! Records, home of Tim Armstrong and Matt Freeman's prior band, Operation Ivy. It is a recording of the band in its earliest days as a three-piece. Although the correct title of the extended play is simply Rancid, it is commonly referred to as I'm Not the Only One or The Bottle (because of the cover) among Rancid collectors and fans.

Only released on seven-inch vinyl, the songs from the extended play have never been re-recorded for future albums. As of June 2008, it is out of print and has not been domestically released on CD, however, its contents appear as bonus tracks on the Japanese release of B Sides and C Sides. In May 2024, it was made available on streaming platforms.

A common bootleg recording from these sessions exists entitled Demos from the Pit. It contains nearly twenty more songs, half of which are unreleased, the others are different versions of songs from its debut studio album, Rancid. Many feature completely different lyrics, and music.

== Track listing ==
All lyrics are written by Tim Armstrong; all music is composed by Armstrong, Matt Freeman and Brett Reed.

Side one
No.	Title	Lead vocals	Length
1.	"I'm Not the Only One"	Armstrong	2:51
2.	"Battering Ram"	Armstrong, Freeman	2:56
Total length:			5:47

Side two
No.	Title	Lead vocals	Length
1.	"The Sentence"	Armstrong, Freeman	1:35
2.	"Media Controller"	Freeman, Armstrong	1:56
3.	"Idle Hands"	Armstrong, Freeman	1:59
Total length:			5:30

== Personnel ==
Rancid

- Tim Armstrong - vocals, guitar
- Matt Freeman - vocals, bass
- Brett Reed - drums

Additional personnel

- Andy Ernst - producer
- Jimmy Johnson - executive producer
- Martin Sprouse - graphics
