= Shaken 69 =

Shaken 69 was a ska side-project started in 1995 in the Berkeley/Oakland area for musicians including Rancid's Tim Armstrong and Matt Freeman, The Uptones' Paul Jackson and Eric Din, Skankin' Pickle's Lars Nylander and Mike Park and former Operation Ivy and Schlong drummer Dave Mello.

The group appeared on the Slice of Lemon compilation released by Kill Rock Stars and Lookout! Records featuring their only released song, "Rudy, Rudy." The band recorded at least one other song called "Glass Pipe Murder" which remains unreleased. Glass Pipe Murder has lyrics taken from Motorcycle Ride, Time Bomb, & Hoover Street.
