= Rebirth (Jimmy Cliff album) =

Studio album by Jimmy Cliff
- Released: 16 July 2012
- Recorded: The Sound Factory, May/June/November 2011, Canyon Hut, December 2011
- Genre: Reggae
- Length: 46:06
- Label: Universal/Sunpower/Hip-O
- Producer: Tim Armstrong

Jimmy Cliff chronology
Black Magic (2004)	Rebirth (2012)	Refugees (2022)

Rebirth is an album by reggae artist Jimmy Cliff released in July 2012. It won the Grammy Award for Best Reggae Album and was included in Rolling Stone's '50 Best Albums of 2012'.

== Recording and release ==
Rebirth was Cliff's first new album in eight years. The album was recorded at The Sound Factory and Canyon Hut in California, and produced by Tim Armstrong of Rancid and featured backing band The Engine Room. Some of the songs were written by Cliff before the recordings sessions, while others were written by Cliff and Armstrong in the studio. Rebirth also includes cover versions of The Clash's "Guns of Brixton" (the lyric of which refers to Cliff's role in The Harder They Come), Joe Higgs' "World Upside Down", and Rancid's "Ruby Soho". The album was mastered by Joe LaPorta.

Rebirth was released in July 2012.

Cliff said of the album: "It is a rebirth of my career at this time. I have goals yet to accomplish, and I think this album is the stepping stone toward those goals.". He also said that the title referred to the rebirth of the planet. It also reflected a return to the music from earlier in his career, with Cliff saying:

"As a rebirth one has to go back to point zero to move forward again. We recorded the music with the same instruments that we had used back in the days, the same style that we used to record, which is everyone recording at the same time."

== Critical reception ==
Professional ratings
Aggregate scores
Source	Rating
Metacritic	81/100
Review scores
Source	Rating
AllMusic	5/5 stars
Alternative Press	4.5/5 stars
Clash	8/10
Cokemachineglow	77%
Consequence of Sound	3.5/5 stars
The Independent	4/5 stars
Pitchfork	7.9/10
PopMatters	9/10
Record Collector	4/5 stars
Spin	7/10

Rolling Stone gave the album four stars out of five, with Will Hermes describing it as "the strongest case for the vitality of West Indian roots music that anyone has made in decades" and calling it "the sound of history circling in wondrous ways". The BBC commented on his return to the sound of his recordings from the 1960s and 1970s, describing the album as "remarkably consistent". Alternative Press gave it 4.5/5, picking out "Cry No More" and "Children's Bread" as sounding like "lost classic[s] of late-'60s/early-'70s Jamaica", going on to call it "a flawless album". The Independent gave it four stars out of five, saying "the spirit of the music is vivid".

Pitchfork rated the album 7.5 out of 10, with reviewer Erin McLeod describing it as "predominantly a pitch-perfect versioning of 1970s reggae". PopMatters gave it 9 out of 10, describing it as "the sound of a man finally getting back to living life to its fullest". AllMusic's David Jeffries gave it 5 stars out of 5, calling it "a return to form".

The album won a Grammy Award in the 'Best Reggae Album' category.

Rebirth was listed at number 12 in Rolling Stone's '50 Best Albums of 2012', the album described as a "warm, wondrous album that plays like a guided tour of the island's musical past, as well as Cliff's own". It was also included at number 48 in a similar list from ABC News.

== Charts and sales ==
Rebirth reached number one on the Billboard Top Reggae Albums chart and number 76 on the Billboard 200. It peaked at number 83 in the UK Albums Chart.

By December 2012 the album had sold 33,000 copies in the United States.

== Track listing ==
1. "World Upside Down" (Cliff, Joe Higgs) – 3:10
2. "One More" (Cliff) – 3:26
3. "Cry No More" (Cliff, Tim Armstrong) – 3:18
4. "Children's Bread" (Cliff, Tim Armstrong) – 4:16
5. "Bang" (Cliff) – 4:43
6. "Guns of Brixton" (Paul Simonon) – 3:38
7. "Reggae Music" (Cliff, Tim Armstrong) – 3:55
8. "Outsider" (Cliff, Tim Armstrong) – 2:58
9. "Rebel Rebel" (Cliff) – 3:03
10. "Ruby Soho" (Lars Frederiksen, Matt Freeman, Tim Armstrong) – 2:53
11. "Blessed Love" (Cliff) – 4:18
12. "Ship Is Sailing" (Cliff) – 3:06
13. "One More" (Alternative version) (Cliff) – 3:31

== Personnel ==
- Jimmy Cliff – vocals, percussion
- Aimee Allen, Ashli Haynes, Dash Hutton, Jean McClain, Jordis Unga, Nicki Bonner, Tim Hutton – backing vocals
- James King – baritone saxophone, tenor saxophone, flute
- J Bonner – bass guitar
- Scott Abels – drums
- Tim Armstrong – lead guitar, rhythm guitar
- Dan Boer – organ
- Kevin Bivona – piano, guitar
- David Moyer, Liam Philpot – saxophone
- Jordan Katz, Michael Bolger – trumpet, trombone

Technical

- Joe LaPorta – mastering

== Charts ==
Chart performance for Rebirth
Chart (2012)	Peak position
Swiss Albums (Schweizer Hitparade)	71
UK Albums (Official Charts)	86
US Billboard 200	76
US Reggae Albums (Billboard)	1
