= Tim Armstrong =

American musician (born 1965)

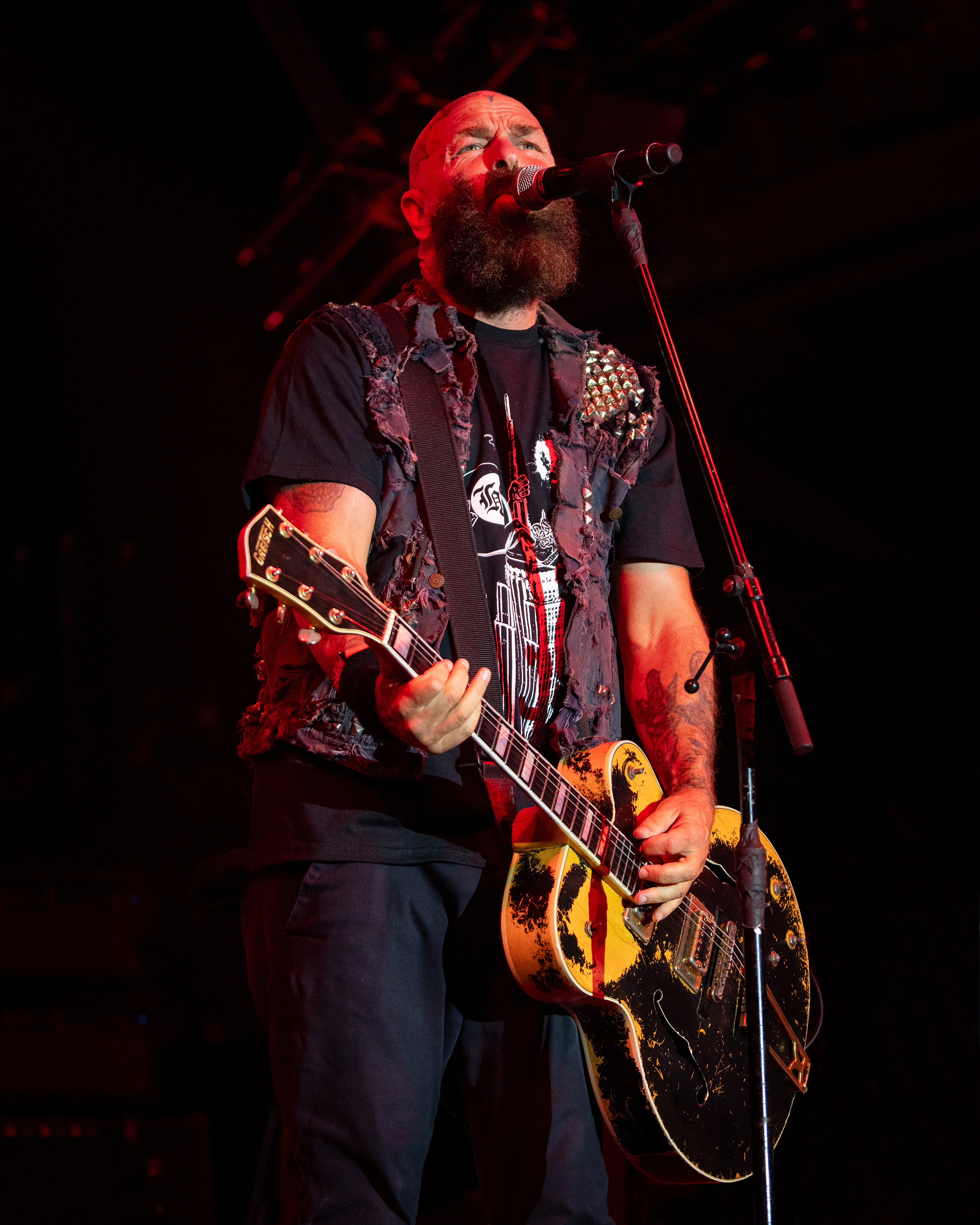
- Armstrong performing in 2023

Background information
- Also known as: Lint; Tim Timebomb
- Born: Timothy Ross Armstrong; November 25, 1965 (age 60); Albany, California, U.S.
- Genres: Punk rock; street punk; ska; ska punk; reggae; hardcore punk; rap rock
- Occupations: Musician; singer; record producer; songwriter
- Instruments: Vocals; guitar
- Years active: 1985–present
- Labels: Lookout!; Hellcat; Epitaph
- Member of: Rancid; Transplants; Devils Brigade
- Formerly of: Operation Ivy; Downfall; Shaken 69; Dance Hall Crashers; Lars Frederiksen and the Bastards; Crimpshrine
- Website: timtimebomb.com

Timothy Ross Armstrong is an American musician, songwriter and record producer. Known for his distinctive voice, he is the singer/guitarist for the punk rock band Rancid and hip hop/punk rock supergroup Transplants. Prior to forming Rancid, Armstrong was in the ska punk band Operation Ivy.

In 1997, along with Brett Gurewitz of the band Bad Religion and owner of Epitaph Records, Armstrong founded Hellcat Records. In 2012, through his website, Armstrong started releasing music that influenced him, along with stripped-down cover songs of his own under the name Tim Timebomb. Armstrong is also a songwriter for other artists. Armstrong won a Grammy Award for his work with Jimmy Cliff and Pink, and has also worked with Joe Walsh and the Interrupters.

== Personal life ==
At the age of five, Armstrong met Matt Freeman while playing Little League Baseball. They grew up a few blocks apart in Albany, California, where Armstrong lived with his mother, father, and older brother, Jeff. Freeman and Armstrong formed bands many years later based on their shared love of bands such as the Clash and the Ramones. They both went to Albany High School.

Armstrong's relationship with Bikini Kill drummer Tobi Vail inspired the Rancid song "Olympia, WA" from ...And Out Come the Wolves.

He was married to musician Brody Dalle from 1997 to 2003. They met in 1995, when Dalle was 16 and Armstrong was 30, after Rancid and Dalle's band Sourpuss both played Summersault Festival in Australia. In 1997, when Dalle was 18, she moved to Los Angeles to live with Armstrong, and she formed the band the Distillers. The couple separated in 2003, after Armstrong saw a picture of Dalle kissing Queens of the Stone Age frontman Josh Homme in an issue of Rolling Stone magazine; she and Homme would later marry. Homme claimed he received death threats from Armstrong's fans. Dalle claimed Armstrong was very controlling of her and it took her three years to leave him. Some of Rancid's songs on 1998's Life Won't Wait ("Who Would've Thought", "Corazón de Oro") detail Armstrong and Dalle's relationship, and songs on 2003's Indestructible ("Fall Back Down", "Ghost Band", "Tropical London") deal with Armstrong's feelings about his divorce.

Armstrong's cousin, Scott, was the guitarist for Canadian punk band Desperate Minds, but they did not know each other until they were introduced at a show in Chicago in 1988 by John Jughead of Screeching Weasel.

== Music career ==
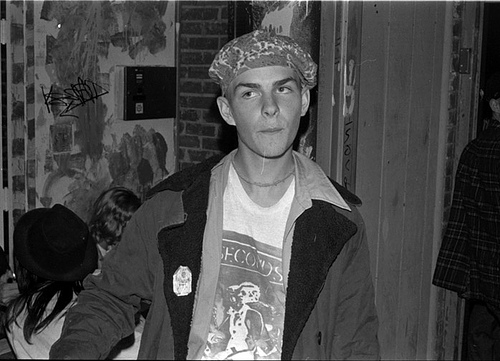
Armstrong in 1987

=== Basic Radio ===
Basic Radio was founded in 1985 and included Matt Freeman and Tim Armstrong. The band never released any albums or EPs, but recorded demos and were featured on local compilations. Two years later they broke up, and Operation Ivy was founded shortly after.

=== Operation Ivy ===
In 1987, along with singer Jesse Michaels, bassist Matt Freeman and drummer Dave Mello, Armstrong formed the ska punk band Operation Ivy and enjoyed modest success before the group disbanded in 1989, the same night the album was released. The band would go on to achieve worldwide cult success in the years following its break-up.

=== Dance Hall Crashers ===
Dance Hall Crashers (named after the Alton Ellis song "Dance Crasher") was formed in 1989 by Armstrong and Matt Freeman after both musicians expressed an interest in starting a band rooted in more traditional ska and rocksteady than what they had been playing with Operation Ivy. The first line-up featured Armstrong on vocals and Freeman on guitar, as well as drummer Erik Larsen, keyboardist Joey Schaaf, vocalist Andrew Champion, guitarist Grant McIntire, and bassist Joel Wing. The band played their first show at 924 Gilman Street in Berkeley in 1989. Shortly after their debut, Freeman and Armstrong left to pursue other interests.

=== Downfall ===
Downfall featured Armstrong, Freeman, and Mello, as well as Mello's brother Pat, and Jason Hammon (also a later member of Dance Hall Crashers). Pat and Jason would both play guitar, while Armstrong took up duties on vocals. They lasted three months (December 1989 to March 1990), playing only at a few parties and twice at Gilman St. They released one song on Maximumrocknroll's They Don't Get Paid, They Don't Get Laid, but Boy, Do They Work Hard! compilation, one song on David Hayes' Very Small World compilation, one song on Lookout! Records' Can of Pork compilation, and recorded a demo. It disbanded when Freeman joined MDC on bass while Armstrong was a roadie for the band, while Pat and Dave went on to form Schlong.

=== Rancid ===
As time went on, Armstrong suffered from depression and alcoholism, and eventually became homeless. During this time, Freeman suggested the two start a new band together, partially in hopes of curbing Armstrong's alcohol addiction. Armstrong began writing songs in 1991 that would appear on their first album which was released in 1993. Their new band, Rancid, would eventually go on to become one of the most critically acclaimed and commercially successful punk rock bands of all time. Rancid has released ten studio albums since their formation with their latest, Tomorrow Never Comes, being released in 2023.

=== The Transplants ===
In 1999, Armstrong invited roadie Rob Aston ("Skinhead Rob") to add lyrics to some solo material that Armstrong had been creating in his basement, and the two worked together writing and recording music. They formed the group Transplants with drummer Travis Barker, of Blink-182, and released their self-titled debut album on October 22, 2002. A second Transplants album, Haunted Cities, was released on June 21, 2005. The Transplants break-up was confirmed by Rob Aston on January 16, 2006, when he told a reporter that the group had split. However, Barker later announced that the trio was working on a new album. They played their first show since 2006 on Conan to promote Barker's new solo album, on which the song "Saturday Night" is featured. It was announced in November 2011 on the Transplants' official Facebook page that their new album would be "finished" in December 2011. Their latest album, entitled Take Cover, was released October 13, 2017, on Epitaph Records.

=== Solo albums/Tim Timebomb ===
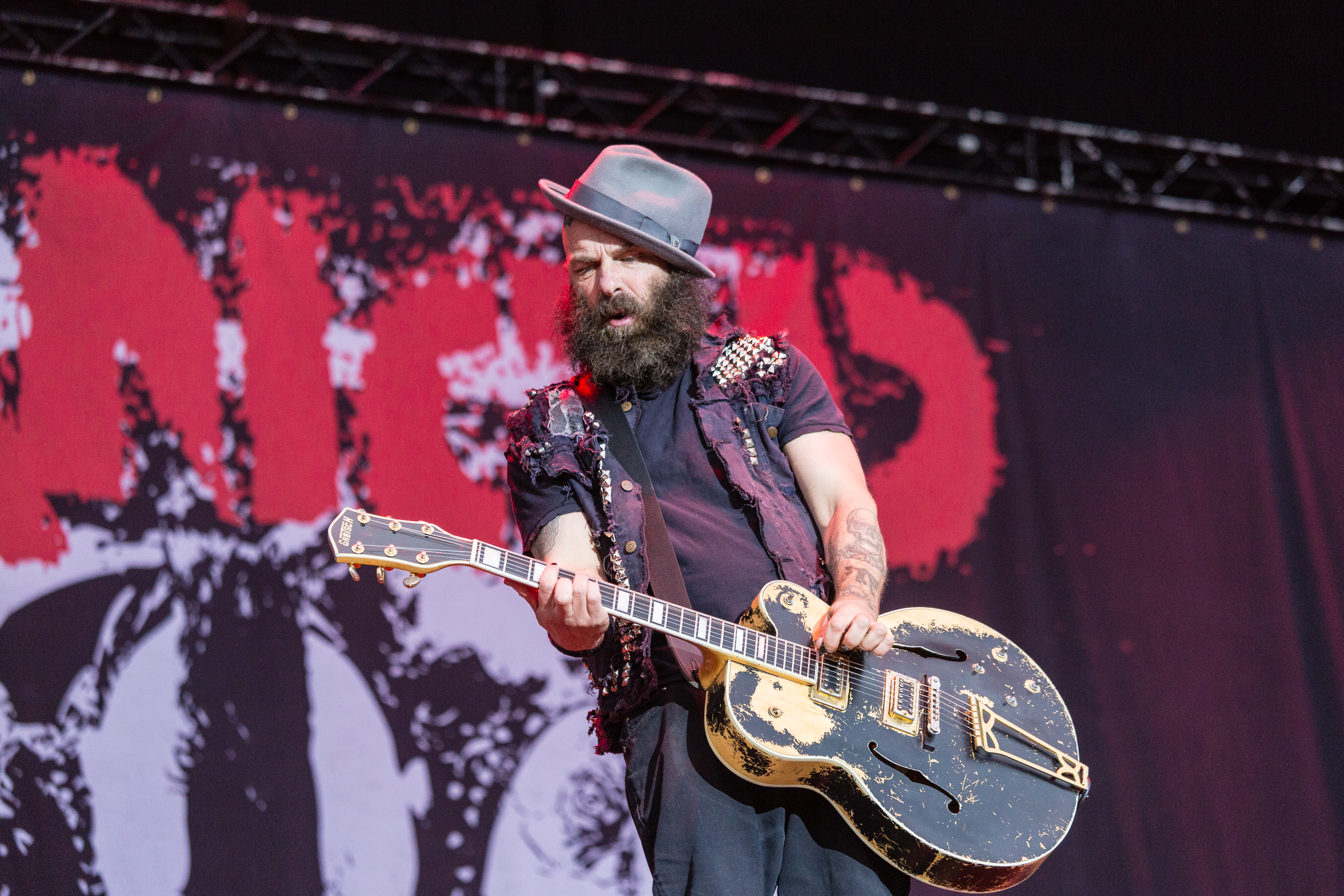
Armstrong in 2017

In 2007, he released his first solo album entitled A Poet's Life with the Aggrolites as his backing band. The track from that album "Into Action" was reported as the number one most played and requested in 2007 on then XM Satellite Radio channel Fungus 53.

In 2012, he launched a side project under the name Tim Timebomb, initially releasing a download only album, entitled "Tim Timebomb Sings Songs from RocknNRoll Theater", containing songs from his musical film series. Since October 29, 2012, he has released a series of songs via YouTube, at a rate of one track each day starting on October 29, 2012. These songs make up a series of download only singles, to date more than 200 tracks have been released, a mixture of original compositions, covers, and re-workings of his previous songs, including those of Rancid.

=== DOOM Regulator ===
In March 2023, Armstrong announced the formation of a new band called Bad Optix that featured his former Operation Ivy bandmate Jesse Michaels, Circle Jerks drummer Joey Castillo and Trash Talk bassist Spencer Pollard. The group released their first single called "Raid" and Armstrong promised tons more songs to come. "I always felt a little sadness that Jesse and I stopped making music together. But we never lost touch. And then it happened. A few years ago we started writing songs again! A couple of the songs ended up on Grade 2's record. Jesse and I just started writing again a lot. It came back. Just like that. Like when we were kids. There is a special chemistry between us and I don't take it for granted" Armstrong said. Less than a week after announcing the formation of the band, the band changed their name to DOOM Regulator due to a band from Seattle already being called Bad Optics.

=== Other projects ===
Armstrong produced and co-wrote eight songs with Pink for her 2003 album Try This. Her song, "Trouble", a 2003 Rancid outtake, went on to win her a Grammy Award. He has also contributed guest vocals on songs for such bands as Bad Religion, 7 Seconds, Time Again, the Matches, Mest, Good Charlotte, Head Automatica, the Aggrolites, the Interrupters, Cypress Hill, and Box Car Racer. He and Matt Freeman also play in a psychobilly band called Devils Brigade, and he co-produced their debut album.

It was announced on August 12, 2011, that Tim Armstrong was working on an album with reggae artist Jimmy Cliff. Their first single, a cover of the Clash song "The Guns of Brixton", was released on October 4, 2011. Sacred Fire EP was released late November 2011. Rebirth was released in July 2012 and won the Grammy Award for Best Reggae Album. And in 2012, Armstrong wrote and performed on Joe Walsh's song "Hi-Roller Baby" from his solo album Analog Man. Armstrong also helped with Anti-Flag's song "Brandenburg Gate".

Though they share a last name and frequently collaborate, Armstrong and Green Day frontman Billie Joe Armstrong are not related. Green Day has covered Operation Ivy songs on their past albums, Billie Joe Armstrong co-wrote and performed on Rancid's song "Radio", and was invited by Tim Armstrong to join Rancid as a second guitarist in 1993. He declined, and Lars Frederiksen got the job. Tim directed the music video for Green Day's 2016 single "Bang Bang". He also plays a punk, seen during the song's bridge. In 2017, Tim Armstrong and Billie Joe Armstrong, together with Tim's nephew Rey Armstrong and Billie Joe's son Joey Armstrong, formed the band the Armstrongs and released their first single "If There Was Ever a Time".

Armstrong also co-produced the EP Footprints and Broken Branches in 2019 by the Los Angeles-based country musician Rosy Nolan along with Kenny Feinstein of the band Water Tower.

In May 2021, Armstrong along with fellow Rancid bandmate Matt Freeman, Fletcher Dragge (Pennywise), Byron McMackin (Pennywise), and Mike Muir (Suicidal Tendencies) formed a punk rock supergroup called the Crew. The band's first single, "One Voice", was released on Epitaph Records.

In August 2026, Armstrong joined Billie Joe Armstrong, Travis Barker, and CJ Ramone to perform as The Cretin Family to celebrate The Ramones' 50th anniversary.

== Hellcat Records ==
Armstrong started Hellcat Records in 1997 as a sub-label of Epitaph, owned by Armstrong's friend and Bad Religion member Brett Gurewitz. Armstrong acts as a talent scout for Hellcat, and has final say concerning what groups are signed to the label. Armstrong was one of the owners of the merchandise manufacturer Machete Mfg, which provides merchandise for bands on Hellcat Records.

== Signature model guitars ==
In 2010, Gretsch Guitars introduced the G5191BK Tim Armstrong Electromatic guitar. The single cutaway hollowbody electric guitar featured a 17" wide body in a flat-black urethane finish, parallel tone bars and sound post, two "Black Top" Filter'Tron pickups, Grover tuners, big block fretboard inlays, a harp tailpiece and gold-plated hardware. Gretsch advertising for the model prominently features Armstrong with the guitar. Armstrong's signature model is based on his 1971 Baldwin-era Gretsch Country Club which he spray-painted black and flipped to accommodate his left-handed playing.

The signature model is available in both right and left-handed models. Fender also put out a signature acoustic model based on Armstrong's favorite 1960s era Fender acoustic guitar. The "Hellcat" has hellcat inlays in the 3rd, 5th, 7th and 9th fret positions and two skulls in the 12th fret. It is outfitted with a tortoise shell pick guard and Fishman brand electronics. It is available in right and left handed models, as well as a 12-string version.

== Discography ==
=== Solo ===
- A Poet's Life (2007)
- Tim Timebomb Sings Songs from RocknNRoll Theater (2012)
- Tim Timebomb singles series (2012-ongoing)

=== with Operation Ivy ===
- Hectic (1988)
- Energy (1989)
- Plea for Peace (1992)
- '69 Newport (1993)
- Under The Gun (Live Claremont '88) (2022)

=== with Downfall ===
- "Long Way to Go" (They Don't Get Paid, They Don't Get Laid, But Boy Do They Work Hard!, 1989)
- "New Regulations" (Very Small World, 1991)
- "North Berkeley" (Can of Pork, 1992)
- "My City" (Later That Same Year, 1992)

=== with Special Forces ===
- "Red White and Blue" (1991)

=== with Rancid ===
- Rancid (1992)
- Rancid (1993)
- Radio Radio Radio (1993)
- Let's Go (1994)
- ...And Out Come the Wolves (1995)
- Life Won't Wait (1998)
- Rancid (2000)
- Indestructible (2003)
- B Sides and C Sides (2008)
- Let the Dominoes Fall (2009)
- Honor Is All We Know (2014)
- Trouble Maker (2017)
- Tomorrow Never Comes (2023)

=== with Shaken 69 ===
- "Rudy Rudy" (A Slice of Lemon, 1995)

=== with The Silencers ===
- "Policeman" (Give 'Em the Boot, 1997)

=== with Nocturnal ===
- "Tell Me What You're Feeling" (Give 'Em the Boot II, 1999)

=== with Lars Frederiksen and the Bastards ===
- Lars Frederiksen and the Bastards (2001)
- Viking (2004)

=== with Transplants ===
- Transplants (2002)
- Haunted Cities (2005)
- In a Warzone (2013)
- Take Cover (2017)

=== with Devils Brigade ===
- "Stalingrad" / "Psychos All Around Me" (2003)
- "Vampire Girl" / "What Have You Done Lately" / "Ride Harley Ride" (2005)
- Devils Brigade (2010)

=== with Armstrongs ===
- "If There Was Ever a Time" (2017)

=== with DOOM Regulator ===
- "Raid" (2023)

=== Guest appearances ===
- "Television" by Bad Religion (Stranger than Fiction, 1994) – vocals
- “Gotta Go” by Agnostic Front, (1998) backing vocals
- "Cat Like Thief" by Box Car Racer (Box Car Racer, 2002) – vocals
- "Dance Party Plus" by Head Automatica (Decadence, 2004) – vocals
- "What's Your Number" by Cypress Hill ("Till Death Do Us Part", 2004) - backing vocals, guitar
- "The Stories Are True" by Time Again (The Stories Are True, 2006) – vocals
- "Outlaw" by The Lordz (The Brooklyn Way, 2006) - featured guest
- "Ghosts" and "(Let's Get Movin') Into Action" by Skye Sweetnam (Sound Soldier, 2007) – backing vocals, songwriting, production
- "Sex And Violence" by Danny Diablo (International Hardcore Superstar, 2009) – vocals, production
- "6 Feet Underground" and "Push Em" by Yelawolf & Travis Barker (Psycho White, 2012) – vocals
- "Hi-Roller Baby" by Joe Walsh (Analog Man, 2012) – songwriting, guitar
- "Booted out of Hell" by The King Blues (Long Live the Struggle, 2012) – vocals
- "Family" by The Interrupters (The Interrupters, 2014) – vocals
- "Brandenburg Gate" by Anti-Flag (American Spring, 2015) – vocals
- "Discovery" by Adil Omar (Transcendence, 2018) – songwriting, guitar
- "No Peace No Justice" by RAT BOY (Internationally Unknown, 2019) – vocals, production
- "Streetsweeper" by SECTION H8 (Welcome to the Nightmare, 2021) – vocals
- "The Final Parade" by The Mighty Mighty BossTones (When God Was Great, 2021) – vocals
- "Dancing On The Radio" by Angel Du$t ("YAK": A Collection Of Truck Songs, 2021) – vocals
- ”As We Live” by The Interrupters (In the Wild, 2022) - vocals

== Production discography ==
- ...And Out Come the Wolves (1995) by Rancid - (co-produced by Jerry Finn and Rancid)
- Answer That and Stay Fashionable (1995) by AFI - (co-produced with AFI, Brett Reed and Doug Sangalang)
- East Los Presents (1997) by Union 13
- At Ease (1997) by The Gadjits
- Life Won't Wait (1998) by Rancid - (co-produced with Lars Frederiksen)
- F-Minus (2000) by F-Minus
- Lars Frederiksen and the Bastards (2001) by Lars Frederiksen and the Bastards
- Mediocre Generica (2001) by Leftöver Crack - (co-produced with Stza)
- Transplants (2002) by Transplants - (co-produced with Dave Carlock)
- Try This (2003) by Pink - (co-produced with Billy Mann, Jonathan S. Davis, Damon Elliott, John Fields, William Orbit and Linda Perry)
- Viking (2004) by Lars Frederiksen and the Bastards
- Haunted Cities (2005) by Transplants - (co-produced with Dave Carlock, also exec. produced by Armstrong)
- Hardcore 4 Life (2005) by Danny Diablo
- The Stories Are True (2006) by Time Again - (executive produced with Time Again)
- Decomposer (2006) by The Matches - (co-produced with Miles Hurwitz, Mark Hoppus, Matt Radosevich, John Feldmann, Mike Green, Johnny Genius, Ryan Divine, Nick Hexum and Brett Gurewitz)
- Live Freaky! Die Freaky! (2006) by John Roecker
- Sound Soldier (2007) by Skye Sweetnam - (co-produced with The Matrix and Soulshock and Karlin)
- Thugcore 4 Life (2007) by Danny Diablo - (co-produced with Dante Ross, John Morrical, Necro, Zuess, Lord Ezec and DJ Spae)
- Devil's Brigade (2010) by Devil's Brigade - (co-produced with Ryan Foltz)
- Sacred Fire EP (2011) by Jimmy Cliff
- Analog Man (2012) by Joe Walsh – (co-produced with Jeff Lynne and Joe Walsh.)
- Rebirth (2012) by Jimmy Cliff – Won Grammy Award for Best Reggae Album
- The Interrupters (2014) by The Interrupters
- Say It Out Loud (2016) by The Interrupters
- Fight the Good Fight (2018) by The Interrupters
- For the Cause (2018) by Madball
- Internationally Unknown (2019) by RAT BOY - (co-produced with RAT BOY)
- "Get Me Ready" (2023) song by Pepper
- One More Time... (2023) by Blink-182 - (co-produced with Travis Barker)

== Filmography ==
- Larry Is Dead (1995) – director, actor, producer
- Live Freaky! Die Freaky! (2003) – producer, narrator
- The Heart Is Deceitful Above All Things (2004) – actor
- Give 'Em the Boot (2005) – producer
- Punk's Not Dead (2007) – producer
- "Rock N Roll Theater" (2011) – actor, producer, writer
- The X-Files (2016) – actor in episode "Home Again" (The X-Files)
- The Twilight Zone (2020) – actor in episode "8" (The Twilight Zone)
- Freaky Tales
