= Gentlemen of the Road (disambiguation) =

Gentlemen of the Road is a 2007 novel by Michael Chabon.

Gentlemen of the Road may also refer to:

- "Gentlemen of the Road" (The Adventures of the Scarlet Pimpernel), an episode of the TV series The Adventures of the Scarlet Pimpernel
- Gentlemen of the Road (company), a live promotions company and record label founded by the band Mumford & Sons
- Highwayman, a thief and brigand who preyed on travellers
- Tramp, a person who travels from place to place as a vagrant

== See also ==
- "Gentleman of the Road", a song by Devils Brigade from Devils Brigade
