= Internationally Unknown =

Studio album by Rat Boy
- Released: 25 January 2019
- Studio: Shiprec Studios (Los Angeles)
- Genre: Rapcore; pop punk; indie rock; rap rock
- Length: 34:12
- Label: Parlophone; Hellcat
- Producer: Rat Boy; Tim Timebomb

Rat Boy chronology
Civil Disorder (2018)	Internationally Unknown (2019)	Government Vacation (2020)

Internationally Unknown is the second studio album by English musician Rat Boy. It was released on 25 January 2019 through Parlophone under exclusive license to Hellcat Records. Recording sessions took place at Shiprec Studios in Los Angeles. Production was handled by Tim Armstrong and Rat Boy.

== Critical reception ==
Professional ratings
Aggregate scores
Source	Rating
AnyDecentMusic?	6.6/10
Metacritic	69/100
Review scores
Source	Rating
AllMusic	4/5 stars
Clash	6/10
DIY	3/5 stars
Exclaim!	6/10
NME	3/5 stars
Pitchfork	5.5/10
Q	4/5 stars
The Observer	4/5 stars

Internationally Unknown was met with generally favorable reviews from music critics. At Metacritic, which assigns a normalized rating out of 100 to reviews from mainstream publications, the album received an average score of 69 based on ten reviews. The aggregator AnyDecentMusic? has the critical consensus of the album at a 6.6 out of 10, also based on ten reviews.

AllMusic's Neil Z. Yeung stated: "there's no need to search for deeper meanings or enlightenment on Internationally Unknown. Instead, Cardy and Armstrong invite listeners to let go and enjoy the ride, which is an energetic, wild blast". Rachel Aroesti of Q called the album "a raucous, irresistibly melodic collection of songs that ring with indignant, apathy-infused joie de vivre". Phil Mongredien of The Observer wrote: "Cardy's lyrics are still a slight disappointment, however, consisting too often of ill-defined "us v them" sentiments (witness "So What"'s "they don't care about us so we don't care about them"). Still, that's a minor quibble—it's hard not to enjoy an album as full of energy as this".

In mixed reviews, Emma Finamore of Clash wrote: "collaboration with Rancid's Tim Armstrong, huh? Sounds right up plenty of people's streets. But that "sweet spot" (in the main) seems to boil down to some cheesy scratching in among the ska pop (see 'My Name Is Rat Boy') and Jamie T-style vocals. But all is not lost. The keys of 'Follow Your Heart' are dreamy and unexpected". Sophie Walker of DIY stated that "Rat Boy works best on this record not giving the fans what they want—but something new". Brad Garcia of Exclaim! pointed out: "with every moment on Internationally Unknown I find odd, I ask myself "was that intentional?" Because I usually have no idea. ... Internationally Unknown is fun and probably not intended to be examined too far past the surface". Rhian Daly of NME resumed: "Rat Boy's international profile might be growing, but he's not ready to conquer the world just yet". Zoe Camp of Pitchfork wrote: "a little bit of retrospective absurdity goes a long way—if only the rest of Internationally Unknown wasn't so pale and redundant".

== Track listing ==
No.	Title	Writer(s)	Length
1.	"Chip on My Shoulder"	Jordan Cardy; Tim Armstrong; Noah Booth; John King; Harry Todd; Liam Haygarth	2:01
2.	"My Name Is Rat Boy"	Cardy; Armstrong; Booth; Jason Bonner	2:32
3.	"Don't Hesitate"	Cardy; Armstrong; Booth; King; Todd; Haygarth	2:52
4.	"I Wanna Skate"	Cardy; Armstrong; Booth; Mike Parvizi; Sean Toomey	2:14
5.	"Follow Your Heart"	Cardy; Armstrong; King	3:34
6.	"Internationally Unknown"	Cardy; Armstrong; Booth; King; Todd; Haygarth	3:18
7.	"So What"	Cardy; Armstrong; Booth	2:34
8.	"No Peace No Justice" (featuring Tim Armstrong)	Cardy; Armstrong; Booth	3:44
9.	"Flies"	Cardy; Armstrong; Booth; King; Todd; Haygarth	2:07
10.	"Night Creature" (featuring Aimee Interrupter)	Cardy; Armstrong; Aimee Allen; Bonner; Parvizi	3:10
11.	"Dad's Crashed Car"	Cardy; Armstrong; Booth	3:20
12.	"Silverlake"	Cardy; Armstrong; Booth; Todd; Haygarth	2:46
Total length:			34:12

== Personnel ==
- Jordan Cardy – vocals, guitar, piano, bass, drums, producer, illustration
- Tim Armstrong – featured artist (track 8), guitar (tracks: 1, 3, 5–9, 11, 12), bass (tracks: 1, 3, 5), producer
- Aimee Allen – featured artist (track 10), backing vocals (track 11)
- Dash Hutton – backing vocals (tracks: 5, 10)
- Kevin Bivona – backing vocals (tracks: 8, 11, 12), organ (track 11), piano & bass (track 12), mixing
- Harry Todd – guitar
- Liam Haygarth – bass
- Noah Booth – drums, engineering, additional producer
- Jason A. Bonner – bass (tracks: 1, 2, 6, 10), organ (tracks: 2, 5, 10), drums (tracks: 2, 10), piano & guitar (track 10), layout
- Mike Parvizi – programmed percussion (tracks: 4, 10)
- Sean Toomey – turntables (track 4)
- Ruben Durazo – trombone (track 5)
- Mark Bush – trumpet (track 5)
- John Morrical – lead guitar (track 7), organ shuffle (track 10), engineering
- John King – engineering, additional producer
- Paris Minzer – mastering

== Charts ==
Chart performance for Internationally Unknown
Chart (2019)	Peak position
UK Vinyl Albums (OCC)	29
