= Honor Is All We Know =

...Honor Is All We Know

Studio album by Rancid
- Released: October 27, 2014
- Recorded: February – March 2013
- Studios: The Boat, Los Angeles, California; Red Star, Los Angeles, California
- Genres: Punk rock, ska punk
- Length: 32:47
- Labels: Hellcat, Epitaph
- Producer: Brett Gurewitz

Rancid chronology
Let the Dominoes Fall (2009)	...Honor Is All We Know (2014)	Trouble Maker (2017)

Singles from ...Honor Is All We Know
- 1. "Collision Course (promotional single)" Released: 2014; 2. "Honor Is All We Know (promotional single)" Released: 2014

...Honor Is All We Know is the eighth studio album by the American punk rock band Rancid, released on October 27, 2014. It is the band's first studio album since Let the Dominoes Fall (2009), and their second one to be recorded under its current incarnation (Tim Armstrong, Lars Frederiksen, Matt Freeman and Branden Steineckert). Work on ...Honor Is All We Know began in 2011 and it was originally planned for a 2012 release, but was repeatedly delayed while the band continued touring and writing new material, and its members were busy with their own projects. After three years of writing and recording, the album was finished in 2014.

== Background and recording ==
Rancid began work on ...Honor Is All We Know as early as 2011. Asked in August 2010 if Rancid was going to release an eighth studio album anytime soon, bassist Matt Freeman replied, "We haven't really figured that out yet. We're not going anywhere [Laughs]. We're going to do something, we just don't know what it is yet. We're always together and we all talk everyday. We're just doing different stuff right now." On May 27, 2011, Rancid announced that they would do a small US tour supporting Blink-182 from August 25 through September 4, 2011, to enable them to warm up before entering the studio in September to begin recording their eighth studio album with producer Brett Gurewitz. They announced that they would embark on a 20th anniversary world tour in 2012 to accompany the album. However, the album did not arrive in 2012, and frontman Tim Armstrong stated that it would be released after Transplants' third album In a Warzone.

On February 6, 2013, Rancid uploaded a picture to their Facebook page of the band in the studio with the caption, "Recording has begun." Branden also noted on his Instagram page that recording was completed in March 2013, but did not explain the reason for the release delay. In a December 2013 interview on Reddit, drummer Branden Steineckert revealed that the eighth Rancid studio album was called ...Honor Is All We Know, and would be released in early 2014.

The track listing and artwork for ...Honor Is All We Know were revealed on September 28, 2014, and on the day after, Rancid announced that the album would be released on October 27, 2014. Armstrong originally recorded the title track as part of his side project Tim Timebomb.

On September 30, 2014, Rancid released a performance video of "Collision Course", "Honor Is All We Know" and "Evil's My Friend". The band started to preview the album's songs through their website a few days later with the release of "Face Up", "Already Dead" and "Diabolical", which followed over a week later.

The album includes a cover of "Everybody Suffering" by Laurel Aitken and retitled "Everybody's Sufferin'." This is the first cover the band has released on a full length since they covered "Get Out of My Way" by The Uptones on their debut LP. "Everybody's Sufferin'" is mis-credited as being written by Rancid in the liner notes.

== Critical reception ==
Professional ratings
Aggregate scores
Source	Rating
AnyDecentMusic?	6.5/10
Metacritic	73/100
Review scores
Source	Rating
AllMusic	2.5/5 stars
Consequence Of Sound	C+
Exclaim!	6/10
Los Angeles Times	2.5/4 stars
Louder	4/5 stars
PopMatters	7/10
The A.V. Club	B
The Sydney Morning Herald	3/5

...Honor Is All We Know was met with generally favorable reviews receiving a 73 on Metacritic and a 6.5 on AnyDecentMusic?.

Metal Hammer gave the album 4 stars stating "Honor Is All We Know, then, is a pleasant surprise, a full-blooded, whole-hearted return from one of the So-Cal punk scene’s most important and influential bands". Brady Nash of PopMatters added "…Honor Is All We Know is a solid but ultimately inessential addition to the Rancid catalogue that finds Rancid back where they belong, crafting straightforward punk anthems without pretense — and next time you catch them live you will probably agree that’s just fine". However Tim of AllMusic gave the album a more negative review claiming "It's the first time they sound empty, too, like they're going through the motions with little or no passion driving them".

The A.V. Club game the album a B grade stating "these new songs should be welcome additions to the band’s live performances instead of being the obligatory respite from what fans actually want to hear—and Rancid’s ability to pull that off by being the best version of itself is what makes this album such a triumph".

== Track listing ==
All tracks are written by Rancid except "Honor Is All We Know" written by Tim Armstrong.

No.	Title	Lead vocals	Length
1.	"Back Where I Belong"	Armstrong	2:12
2.	"Raise Your Fist"	Armstrong	3:05
3.	"Collision Course"	Armstrong, Frederiksen	1:57
4.	"Evil's My Friend"	Armstrong	2:10
5.	"Honor Is All We Know"	Armstrong, Frederiksen, Freeman	2:12
6.	"A Power Inside"	Armstrong	2:04
7.	"In the Streets"	Armstrong, Frederiksen	2:26
8.	"Face Up"	Armstrong, Frederiksen	1:35
9.	"Already Dead"	Armstrong, Frederiksen	2:22
10.	"Diabolical"	Armstrong	3:12
11.	"Malfunction"	Armstrong, Frederiksen	2:26
12.	"Now We're Through with You"	Armstrong	1:52
13.	"Everybody's Sufferin'"	Armstrong	2:56
14.	"Grave Digger"	Armstrong, Frederiksen	2:20

=== Bonus tracks ===
Deluxe edition/iTunes bonus tracks
No.	Title	Length
15.	"Breakdown"	2:20
16.	"Something to Believe in a World Gone Mad"	2:47
17.	"Turn In Your Badge"	1:15

LP bonus track
No.	Title	Length
15.	"Breakdown"	2:20

Japanese bonus tracks
No.	Title	Length
15.	"Breakdown" (mislabeled "Break Down the Walls" on back cover)	2:20
16.	"Something to Believe in a World Gone Mad"	2:47
17.	"Turn in Your Badge"	1:15
18.	"Rancid's Barmy Army" (mislabeled "Rancid' Barmy Army" on back cover)	1:21

== Personnel ==
Rancid

- Tim Armstrong – guitars, vocals, mixer (credited as Tim Timebomb)
- Lars Frederiksen – guitars, vocals
- Matt Freeman – bass, vocals
- Branden Steineckert – drums

Additional personnel

- Skinhead Rob – additional vocals
- Mike McColgan – additional vocals
- Chris Hollosy – additional vocals
- Kevin Bivona – B3 organ, piano, percussion, mixer, engineer
- Brett Gurewitz – producer, additional vocals
- Phillip Broussard Jr. – engineer
- Jeff Halbert – assistant engineer
- Ruff Stewart – studio tech
- Bob Ludwig – mastering

== Charts ==
Chart (2014)	Peak position
Australian Albums (ARIA)	34
Austrian Albums (Ö3 Austria)	58
Belgian Albums (Ultratop Flanders)	113
Canadian Albums (Billboard)	25
French Albums (SNEP)	157
German Albums (Offizielle Top 100)	84
New Zealand Albums (RMNZ)	40
Swiss Albums (Schweizer Hitparade)	63
Scottish Albums (OCC)	38
UK Albums (OCC)	45
UK Album Downloads (OCC)	66
UK Physical Albums (OCC)	41
UK Rock & Metal Albums (OCC)	6
UK Independent Albums (OCC)	6
US Billboard 200	20
US Top Rock Albums (Billboard)	4
US Top Hard Rock Albums (Billboard)	3
Top Rock & Alternative Albums (Billboard)	4
US Independent Albums (Billboard)	3
US Vinyl Albums chart	3
