= Viking (album) =

2004 studio album by Lars Frederiksen and the Bastards

Studio album by Lars Frederiksen and the Bastards
- Released: July 13, 2004 (US); July 12, 2004 (EU)
- Recorded: 2004
- Genres: Street punk; punk rock
- Length: 38:41
- Label: Hellcat
- Producer: Tim Armstrong

Lars Frederiksen and the Bastards chronology
Lars Frederiksen and the Bastards (2001)	Viking (2004)

Professional ratings
Review scores
Source	Rating
Allmusic	2/5 stars

Viking is the second and final studio album by the American punk rock band Lars Frederiksen and the Bastards. It was released on July 13, 2004 via Hellcat Records. The album peaked at #17 on the Independent Albums and #18 on the Heatseekers Albums.

== Track listing ==
No.	Title	Writer(s)	Length
1.	"Bastards"	L. Frederiksen; T. Armstrong	1:41
2.	"Skins, Punx and Drunx"	L. Frederiksen; T. Armstrong	1:04
3.	"Fight"	L. Frederiksen; T. Armstrong	0:56
4.	"1%"	L. Frederiksen; T. Armstrong	2:46
5.	"Switchblade" (featuring Skinhead Rob)	L. Frederiksen; R. Aston; T. Armstrong	3:38
6.	"Marie Marie" (The Blasters cover)	D. Alvin	1:55
7.	"Little Rude Girl"	L. Frederiksen; T. Armstrong	1:17
8.	"Maggots"	L. Frederiksen; T. Armstrong	2:00
9.	"Mainlining Murder"	L. Frederiksen; T. Armstrong	3:30
10.	"For You" (Anti-Nowhere League cover)	C. Exall; N. Culmer; D. Aghssa; M. Gilham; C. Blake	3:11
11.	"My Life to Live" (featuring Tim Armstrong)	L. Frederiksen; T. Armstrong	4:27
12.	"The Kids Are Quiet on Sharmon Palms"	L. Frederiksen; T. Armstrong	2:46
13.	"Blind Ambition"	L. Frederiksen; T. Armstrong	0:20
14.	"Gods of War"	L. Frederiksen; T. Armstrong	0:55
15.	"Streetwise Professor"	L. Frederiksen; T. Armstrong	3:10
16.	"The Viking"	L. Frederiksen; T. Armstrong	5:05
17.	"Road to Hell" (Japan bonus track)
Total length:			38:41

== Personnel ==
- Lars Frederiksen - vocals, guitar
- Craig Fairbaugh - rhythm guitar, vocals
- Jason Woods - bass, vocals
- Gordy Carbone - vocals
- Scott Abels - drums
- Tim Armstrong - vocals (track 11), guitar (track 16), backing vocals, producer, additional engineer, photography, artwork
- Robert Aston - vocals (track 5)
- Chris Dugan - backing vocals, assistant engineer
- Brett Reed - backing vocals
- Dan Hodge - backing vocals
- Lochlan McHale - backing vocals
- Matt Freeman - mandolin
- Carl Wheeler - Wurlitzer electric piano & Hammond B-3 organ (track 16)
- Alen C. Agadhzhanyan - strings & violin (track 16)
- Dave Carlock - Hammond B-3 organ (track 11), additional engineer
- Michael Rosen - engineer
- Alex Reverberi - assistant engineer
- Tim Baker - mastering
- Brett Gurewitz - mixing
- Tom D. Kline - artwork
- Rachel Tejada - artwork
- Tim Lehi - illustration

== Charts ==
Chart (2004)	Peak position
US Billboard Independent Albums	17
US Billboard Heatseekers Albums	18

== Release history ==
Region	Date	Format(s)	Edition(s)	Label(s)
United States	July 13, 2004	CD; LP	Standard	Hellcat Records
Europe	July 12, 2004	CD; digital download; LP	Standard	Hellcat Records
Japan	July 14, 2004	CD; Digipak; LP	Japan bonus track edition	Epitaph Records
