= Devils Brigade (band) =

American rock band

- Genres: Punk rock, psychobilly
- Years active: 2000–present
- Labels: Hellcat
- Members: Matt Freeman; Tim Armstrong; DJ Bonebrake; Rob Milucky
- Past members: Brett Reed

Devils Brigade is an American rock band formed as a side project by Rancid bassist Matt Freeman in 2000. In Devils Brigade Freeman performs a mix of punk rock and psychobilly styles, singing lead vocals and playing a double bass in contrast to the backing vocals and bass guitar he performs in Rancid. He was backed by his Rancid bandmates for singles released in 2003 and 2005, and recruited X drummer DJ Bonebrake to play on Devils Brigade's eponymous debut album in 2010.

== History ==
Devils Brigade was started in 2000 by Matt Freeman as a side project from his regular band, Rancid, when he and longtime bandmate Tim Armstrong began writing songs together in between Rancid tours. While Freeman plays the electric bass guitar and sings backing and occasional lead vocals in Rancid, Devils Brigade would feature him on lead vocals and playing a double bass, incorporating elements of psychobilly into his usual punk rock repertoire. Devils Brigade debuted with the song "Vampire Girl" on the 2002 compilation album Give 'Em the Boot III, released by Armstrong's label Hellcat Records. Freeman was backed by Armstrong on guitar and their Rancid bandmate Brett Reed on drums for this track and two subsequent 12" singles—"Stalingrad" / "Psychos All Around Me" (2003) and "Vampire Girl" (2005)—both released through Rancid Records during downtime between Rancid tours.

Following tours in support of Rancid's 2009 album Let the Dominoes Fall, Freeman revived Devils Brigade to record a full-length album. It was originally envisioned as a concept album based on an idea of Armstrong's for a musical about the construction of the Golden Gate Bridge, titled Half Way to Hell Club after the informal fraternity of nineteen steelworkers who were caught by safety netting strung below the construction site, saving them from what would have otherwise been fatal falls into the bay below. "We grew up in the East Bay looking at that bridge and it has always been a part of our lives", said Freeman.

Six of the album's twelve tracks originated from this concept, while the remaining six were re-recorded tracks from the first Devils Brigade demo. The album was recorded in early 2010 with Armstrong on guitar and drummer DJ Bonebrake of X and The Knitters, who had previously played with Freeman in Auntie Christ, and includes contributions from Rancid member Lars Frederiksen. "It was a great vibe in the studio," said Freeman, "The record has a real live and loose vibe. Loose in a good way. Tim's guitar style blended really well with DJ and everything clicked very quickly." The album was released as Devils Brigade August 31, 2010, through Hellcat Records. Devils Brigade toured the United States supporting Street Dogs from August through October 2010.

According to the ASCAP website, the band wrote a song titled I Can See The Ocean, but it is unknown as to whether or not the song made the album under a different name or not.

== Members ==
Current members

- Matt Freeman – lead vocals, double bass, guitars, bass guitar (2000–present)
- Tim Armstrong – guitars, vocals (2000–present)
- DJ Bonebrake – drums, percussion, vibraslap (2010–present)
- Rob Milucky – guitar (2012-present)

Former members

- Brett Reed – drums (2000–2006)

Touring members

- Chris Arredondo – drums (2010–2011)
- Rob Milucky – guitar (2010–2012)

== Discography ==
- "Stalingrad" / "Psychos All Around Me" 12" single (2003)
- "Vampire Girl" 12" single (2005)
- Devils Brigade (2010)

=== Music videos ===
- "I'm Movin' Through" (2010)
