= A Poet's Life =

Studio album & DVD by Tim Armstrong
- Released: May 21, 2007
- Recorded: 2006–2007
- Studio: Signet Sound Studios (Los Angeles, CA); Bloodclot Studios (Los Angeles, CA); Weeping Buddha
- Genre: Ska; reggae
- Length: 33:44
- Label: Hellcat; Epitaph
- Producer: Tim Armstrong; John Morrical; Rachel Tejada

Tim Armstrong chronology
A Poet's Life (2007)	Tim Timebomb Sings Songs from RocknNRoll Theater (2012)

A Poet's Life is the debut solo studio album by American musician Tim Armstrong. It was recorded with The Aggrolites in Los Angeles, California and released on May 22, 2007, via Hellcat Records.

The album was initially released for free as downloads on the internet. Later it was announced that it would be a physical product as well. The album comes with a DVD featuring a video for every song on the album.

== History ==
On August 29, 2006, Armstrong sent out a bulletin over MySpace, the text of which later appeared on Epitaph Records' site (Hellcat Records is a subsidiary of Epitaph) that explained his decision to release a solo LP. Unlike most albums, Armstrong said that it would be free and downloadable over the internet, with one song being released at a time. That same day, the first track, "Hold On", appeared as an MP3 and music video on Epitaph's site. Almost two months later, on October 11, 2006, the second track, "Wake Up", was released in the same manner. No more tracks have been released in this manner, but in March 2007, "Into Action" was played on KROQ-FM.

At some point, Epitaph's site listed a release date of February 6, 2007 but it was later changed to June 7. When KROQ started playing the single Into Action the release date was pushed up to May 22. Despite little promotion Into Action peaked on the Billboard Hot Modern Rock Tracks at number 39 and stayed on the chart for 2 weeks.

In Epitaph's last newsletter, it was said that they will be releasing the last eight tracks of the album (including the video to the track) in the coming weeks before it is released. However, they also mentioned that, they won't be telling listeners where. Those wishing to download the album have to find the songs on various websites.

== Chart performance ==
Professional ratings
Review scores
Source	Rating
AllMusic	4/5 stars
Sputnikmusic	2.5/5 stars

A Poet's Life peaked at number 59 on the US Billboard 200, number 18 on the Top Rock Albums chart, number 2 on the Independent Albums chart, number 7 on the Tastemakers chart, and number 196 on the Top 200 Albums chart in France. Its lead single, "Into Action", peaked at number 39 on the Alternative Songs chart.

== Track listing ==
All lyrics are written by Tim Armstrong.

No.	Title	Length
1.	"Wake Up"	2:59
2.	"Hold On"	3:52
3.	"Into Action" (featuring Skye Sweetnam)	3:39
4.	"Translator"	4:11
5.	"Take This City"	3:14
6.	"Inner City Violence"	3:48
7.	"Oh No"	3:07
8.	"Lady Demeter"	2:24
9.	"Among The Dead"	3:32
10.	"Cold Blooded"	2:45
Total length:		33:44

Japanese edition bonus track
No.	Title	Length
11.	"Into Action" (Remix)	3:41

DVD
No.	Title	Length
1.	"Wake Up"	3:00
2.	"Hold On"	3:52
3.	"Into Action"	3:40
4.	"Translator"	4:10
5.	"Take This City"	3:14
6.	"Inner City Violence"	3:48
7.	"Oh No"	3:08
8.	"Lady Demeter"	2:24
9.	"Among The Dead"	3:30
10.	"Cold Blooded"	2:46

Notes

- Song "The Dark" was once listed to be on the album, but was removed or renamed for the final release
- Song "Translator" was previously titled "Girl, I Only Want What's Best For You," but was renamed for the final release
- Song "Lady Demeter" was previously titled "Burning Angel," but was renamed for the final release

== Personnel ==
- Tim Armstrong – lead vocals, guitar, mixing, producer, engineer, artwork, photography, video director, video editor
- Jesse Wagner – guitar, backing vocals
- Brian Dixon – guitar, engineer
- Jason A. Bonner – bass guitar
- Roger Rivas – organ & piano
- Korey Horn – drums
- Scott Abels – drums
- Saliva Cano – percussion
- Ritchie Stites – backing vocals (track 2, 6)
- Skye Sweetnam – backing vocals (track 3)
- Daphna Dove – backing vocals (track 10)
- John Morrical – additional guitar (tracks: 2, 4), piano (track 3), harmonica (track 8), mixing, engineer, producer
- Belinda "Bibi" McGill – additional guitar (track 5, 6, 10)
- Hunter Perrin – additional guitar (track 4)
- Jubal Jones – saxophone (track 1, 3, 4, 9)
- Ethan Avineri – trumpet (tracks: 1, 3, 4, 9)
- Tom Cook – trombone (tracksL 1, 4, 9)
- DJ Odie – scratches (track 6)
- Gene Grimaldi – mastering
- Rachel Tejada – artwork, photography, video editor, video director, DVD producer
- Shaun Otsuka – assistant video editor/film technician
- Steven S. Friedman – assistant video editor/film technician
- Matt Ferguson – film technician
- Kali Niemann – film technician
- Nazeli Kodjoian – film technician
- Mando Gonzalez – additional cameraman (DVD tracks: 3, 4, 7, 9)
- Cameron "The Lens" Glendenning – additional cameraman (DVD track 2)
- Tom D. Klime – layout
- Chris Lasalle – A&R
- Abe Baruck – management
- Camden Lock – wardrobe
- Chelsea Rebelle – wardrobe

== Charts ==
Chart (2007)	Peak position
France Top 200 Albums	196
US Billboard 200	59
US Top Rock Albums (Billboard)	18
US Independent Albums (Billboard)	2
US Tastemakers (Billboard)	7
