= Fall Back Down =

Single by Rancid

from the album Indestructible
- Released: July 22, 2003
- Recorded: 2002–2003
- Genre: Punk rock
- Length: 3:44
- Label: Hellcat
- Songwriter: Tim Armstrong / Lars Frederiksen
- Producer: Brett Gurewitz

Rancid singles chronology
""Radio Havana"" (2000)	"Fall Back Down" (2003)	""Red Hot Moon"" (2004)

"Fall Back Down" is a song by the American punk rock band Rancid. It was released as the first single from their sixth album, Indestructible. "Fall Back Down" was released to radio on July 22, 2003. It peaked at number 13 on the US Modern Rock Tracks.

"Fall Back Down" was written by Tim Armstrong and Lars Frederiksen after Armstrong's divorce from Distillers vocalist Brody Dalle, and is about friendship. The video featured guest appearances from Benji Madden of Good Charlotte and Kelly Osbourne.

The song features three guitar solos, two by Tim Armstrong and one by Lars Frederiksen.

Canadian musician Lights recorded a cover for her EP titled "Acoustic" in 2010.

The song was featured on the soundtracks for NASCAR Thunder 2004, Tony Hawk's Underground 2, and Forza Horizon 3. It was also featured in the movie The Wedding Ringer.

== Track listing ==
No.	Title	Length
1.	"Fall Back Down"	3:44
2.	"Killing Zone"	2:39
3.	"Stranded"	2:24

== Charts ==
Chart performance for "Fall Back Down"
Chart (2003)	Peak position
Australia (ARIA)	92
UK Singles (Official Charts)	42
US Alternative Airplay (Billboard)	13
