= Indestructible (Rancid album) =

Studio album by Rancid
- Released: August 19, 2003
- Recorded: 2002–2003
- Studio: Sound City Studios; Grandmaster Recorders; Sonora Recorders; (Los Angeles, CA)
- Genre: Punk rock; ska punk; skate punk
- Length: 52:31
- Label: Hellcat, Warner Bros.
- Producer: Brett Gurewitz

Rancid chronology
| BYO Split Series, Vol. 3 (2002) | Indestructible (2003) | B Sides and C Sides (2007) |

Singles from Indestructible
- 1. "Fall Back Down" Released: July 22, 2003; 2. "Red Hot Moon" Released: October 27, 2003

Indestructible is the sixth studio album by the American punk rock band Rancid. It was produced by Brett Gurewitz (Bad Religion) and released by Hellcat Records with distribution through Warner Bros. Records on August 19, 2003. It debuted at number 15 on the charts, selling 51,000 copies in its first week. It was Rancid's highest debut at the time, which was surpassed six years later with their 2009 album, Let the Dominoes Fall. Indestructible marks the last recording by drummer Brett Reed, who left the band in 2006 and was replaced by current drummer Branden Steineckert (formerly of The Used). Additionally, it is the only album that features songwriting contributions from Reed.

== Background ==
Prior to the album's release the band signed a special distribution deal with Warner Bros. Records, which was met with major backlash from many of the band's fans for abandoning their independent roots. To ease tension among the fans, the album was released with no mention of Warner Bros. on the album packaging. According to a label spokesman "It's a unique deal that doesn't play by the traditional record biz rules. It's Rancid putting out an album on Hellcat, with the possibility of additional support from [Warner Bros.]." In a statement, Lars Frederiksen discussed the Warner Bros. deal by saying "We have absolutely no complaints with Hellcat. Yes, we are considering additional support that Warner Bros. might be able to provide, but whatever happens, we're sticking with Brett Gurewitz. All I care about and all I have is my music, my bandmates and my band. We are going to do whatever we need to do to survive."

== Writing and production ==
Production of the album began with following a US tour with NOFX in April and concluded in January 2003. Indestructible was described as the band's most personal album, covering personal issues including Tim Armstrong's divorce from ex-wife Brody Dalle on songs such as "Fall Back Down", "Ghost Band" and "Tropical London". The album's final track, "Otherside", was written by Lars Frederiksen and dedicated to his brother Robert, who died in 2001. The album was also dedicated two of band's mentors and influences: Joe Strummer and Joey Ramone, who both died during the making of the album. Strummer is mentioned in the album's title track.

Post production of the album consisted of cutting the record down from 25 tracks to 19 tracks. The six tracks left off of the final album were "Killing Zone", "Stranded", "Trouble", "Road to Hell", "Warfare", and "Squatter House"." Killing Zone" and "Stranded" were used as b-sides and bonus tracks for the record. "Trouble" was reworked and released as a single on Pink's third album Try This. That version of the song won Tim Armstrong and Pink a Grammy. "Road to Hell" was re-recorded and a Japanese bonus track on the 2nd Lars Frederiksen And The Bastards album Viking. "Warfare" and "Squatter House" remain unreleased.

== Release ==
On June 6, 2003, the album's track listing was posted online. From June to August 2003, the group went on the 2003 edition of Warped Tour. On July 24, "Indestructible", "Back Against the Wall", and "Red Hot Moon" were posted on the band's website. "Fall Back Down" was released to radio on July 22, 2003. A music video for the song was posted on Yahoo! Launch on August 4, 2003.

The album was delayed a number of times before its official release. It was first scheduled for release in summer/fall 2002 beforing being delayed to early 2003, mid, and finally August 19, 2003. Chief among the reasons for the album's delay were band members' other commitments. Singer/guitarist Tim Armstrong released an album with his then-new side project Transplants and second guitarist Lars Frederiksen released an album with Lars Frederiksen and the Bastards. Warner Bros. Records released the CD version while LP was released by Epitaph. In August and September, the band toured Europe, a few shows of which were as part of the Reconstruction Festival. On September 30, they appeared on Late Night with Conan O'Brien. They then embarked on a headlining US tour in November, with Tiger Army; Nekromantix, the Frisk, and Roger Miret and the Disasters appeared on select dates. In February 2003, Rancid toured across Japan. "Red Hot Moon" was released to radio on October 28, 2003; a music video for the song was released to days later, and was filmed at CBGBs in New York City. In December, the band went on the Hellcat Tour with Tiger Army and F-Minus. Tim Shaw of Ensign sang Skinhead Rob's section of "Red Hot Moon" during the tour. Later in the month, the band performed at the KROQ Almost Acoustic Christmas festival. "Tropical London" was released as a promotional single to radio on April 27, 2004. A music video was released for "Spirit of '87" however it was not released as a single.

Following the release of the album, the group went on hiatus while each of the members toured and recorded albums with other bands.

== Reception ==
Professional ratings
Review scores
| Source | Rating |
|---|---|
| AllMusic | 3.5/5 stars |
| Blender | 4/5 stars |
| Drowned in Sound | 6/10 |
| Entertainment Weekly | B+ |
| IGN | 8.8/10 |
| PopMatters | (Favorable) |
| Robert Christgau | A− |
| Rolling Stone | 3/5 stars |
| Spin | B |

The album was with mostly positive critical reviews, reaching #15 on the charts and making it the band's biggest debut at the time. However, some fans criticized the album for its stylistic departure from earlier work, claiming that a major label had influenced the band's music to appeal to mainstream listeners (despite the album being written prior to the band's agreement with the label). Still others felt the album to be a mixture of ...And Out Come the Wolves and Life Won't Wait. The album's first single "Fall Back Down", a song written about Armstrong's divorce and reliance on his close friends, was also met with some backlash from fans for featuring members of Good Charlotte and Kelly Osbourne in its music video.

RJ Smith of Blender gave the album a 4/5 stars writing "They drop the bomb right at the start: “Lay back, rock & roll, come inside me,” singer Tim Armstrong caterwauls on “Indestructible.” Even before he invokes Joe Strummer, the spirit of punk-rock past, in the same song, you know this is a great punk record, a great rock record — just a great record." Adam Williams of PopMatters gave the album a favorable review claiming "The most noteworthy aspect of Indestructible comes by way of Rancid's longevity and success. With the drastic musical shifts of the last decade, who would have guessed that a punk band could flourish while continuing to produce commercially viable albums? Amazingly, the past ten years have seen grunge, hair metal, and Britpop run their respective courses, while a bunch of tattooed, studded-jacket, California punks endure." Tim Sendra of AllMusic added "The only downside of the album is the slow ballad "Arrested in Shanghai," which is an admirable attempt at expanding their sound which nevertheless is a failure." However he ended the review stating "If you know Rancid and love Rancid, you will love this record like an old friend. If you are new to the band, get this and then get …And Out Come the Wolves immediately."

Brody Dalle has never listened to the album. "I had no desire to listen to [Tim's] record [at the time it came out]. Someone said there was a song called "Tropic London", which was maybe about me and Melbourne. I still haven't heard it."

== Track listing ==
All tracks are written by Tim Armstrong and Lars Frederiksen, except where noted.

| No. | Title | Lead vocals | Length |
|---|---|---|---|
| 1. | "Indestructible" | Armstrong | 1:36 |
| 2. | "Fall Back Down" | Armstrong | 3:43 |
| 3. | "Red Hot Moon" (featuring Skinhead Rob) (Armstrong, Frederiksen, Brett Reed, Rob Aston) | Armstrong, Skinhead Rob | 3:36 |
| 4. | "David Courtney" | Frederiksen | 2:44 |
| 5. | "Start Now" | Armstrong | 3:05 |
| 6. | "Out of Control" | Frederiksen | 1:41 |
| 7. | "Django" (Armstrong) | Armstrong | 2:25 |
| 8. | "Arrested in Shanghai" | Armstrong | 4:11 |
| 9. | "Travis Bickle" | Armstrong | 2:16 |
| 10. | "Memphis" | Armstrong | 3:25 |
| 11. | "Spirit of '87" (Armstrong, Frederiksen, Dave Carlock) | Armstrong, Freeman, Frederiksen | 3:22 |
| 12. | "Ghost Band" | Armstrong | 1:37 |
| 13. | "Tropical London" | Armstrong | 3:01 |
| 14. | "Roadblock" (Armstrong, Frederiksen, Reed) | Armstrong, Freeman, Frederiksen | 1:58 |
| 15. | "Born Frustrated" | Frederiksen | 2:56 |
| 16. | "Back Up Against the Wall" | Armstrong | 3:20 |
| 17. | "Ivory Coast" | Armstrong | 2:19 |
| 18. | "Stand Your Ground" | Armstrong | 3:24 |
| 19. | "Otherside" | Armstrong, Frederiksen | 1:52 |
| Total length: | | | 52:31 |

iTunes bonus track
| No. | Title | Length |
|---|---|---|
| 20. | "Stranded" | 2:24 |

LP/Japanese bonus track
| No. | Title | Length |
|---|---|---|
| 20. | "Killing Zone" | 2:39 |

== Album notes ==
- "Out of Control" was used for the video game Need For Speed: Underground.
- "Fall Back Down", was used on Tony Hawk's Underground 2 soundtrack, the EA Sports video game NASCAR Thunder 2004 and the Forza Horizon 3 soundtrack.
- The average score on Metacritic for the album was a positive 84%
- The LP bonus track "Killing Zone" is also available on the Give 'Em the Boot IV compilation.
- "Killing Zone" was also the last song Rancid recorded with Brett Reed in the band.
- "Fall Back Down" was also featured in the movie Agent Cody Banks 2

== Personnel ==
Adapted from the album liner notes.

Rancid

- Tim Armstrong – guitar, vocals, mixing (18), cover photo
- Lars Frederiksen – guitar, vocals
- Matt Freeman – bass, vocals
- Brett Reed – drums

Additional personnel

- Luis Conte – percussion
- Vic Ruggiero – keyboards
- Skinhead Rob – vocals (3)
- Siedah Garrett – vocals
- Brett Gurewitz – vocals, producer, additional engineer, mixing (6, 10, 12, 13, 14, 19)
- Nick Raskulinecz – engineer, editing
- Andrew Alekel – additional engineer
- John "Silas" Cranfield – assistant engineer
- Pete Martinez – assistant engineer
- Citris Reynolos – assistant engineer
- Dave Carlock – editing
- Seth McLain – editing
- Edmond Monsef – editing
- Doug Boehm – mixing (1, 3, 4, 7–9, 11, 15–17)
- Rob Schnapf – mixing (1, 3, 4, 7–9, 11, 15–17)
- Kevin Dran – mixing assistant (1, 3, 4, 7–9, 11, 15–17)
- Joe Barresi – mixing (2, 5)
- Brian Gardner – mastering
- Nick Pritchard – design

== Charts ==
Chart performance for Indestructible
| Chart (2003) | Peak position |
|---|---|
| Australian Albums (ARIA) | 48 |
| Austrian Albums (Ö3 Austria) | 59 |
| Dutch Albums (Album Top 100) | 88 |
| French Albums (SNEP) | 84 |
| German Albums (Offizielle Top 100) | 81 |
| Italian Albums (FIMI) | 34 |
| Norwegian Albums (VG-lista) | 36 |
| Swedish Albums (Sverigetopplistan) | 35 |
| UK Albums (OCC) | 29 |
| US Billboard 200 | 15 |
