= Ryan Foltz =

American singer and producer

Ryan Foltz is an American producer, audio engineer and musician from Mansfield, Ohio. Foltz is best known for being a member of the Dropkick Murphys from 2001 to 2003 where he played mandolin, tin whistle and dulcimer on the band's 2001 album Sing Loud, Sing Proud and 2003's Blackout before leaving the band. Foltz also was a member of Motel Blonde (bass) and also has played tin whistle, mandolin, and trumpet in The Pogues cover band, The Boys From The County Hell for over fifteen years. He was also a member of the Bluecoats Drum and Bugle Corps.

Foltz from 2000-2003 was a member of the Dropkick Murphys and would recorded 2001's Sing Loud, Sing Proud and 2003's Blackout before leaving the band.

Foltz was employed from 2006-2014 as touring monitor technician for Rancid, and has also toured doing sound for: Lars Frederiksen and the Bastards, Tim Armstrong, Dropkick Murphys, The Unseen, and Tiger Army, among others.

Foltz appears on Tim Armstrong's Tim Timebomb project, a large collection of cover and original songs recorded by Armstrong and various musician friends.

Foltz owns and operates Cleveland Audio Studios, now based in Sheffield Lake, OH.
