= Auntie Christ =

American punk rock band

- Genres: Punk rock
- Years active: Late 1990s
- Label: Lookout! Records
- Past members: Exene Cervenka; D.J. Bonebrake; Matt Freeman

Auntie Christ is a late-1990s punk rock band, led by singer and guitarist Exene Cervenka, alongside D.J. Bonebrake of the band X, and Matt Freeman of the band Rancid.

== Discography ==
- Life Could Be A Dream

Track List:
1. "Bad Trip"
2. "I Don't"
3. "Not You"
4. "Tell Me"
5. "A Rat in the Tunnel of Love"
6. "Look out Below"
7. "The Virus"
8. "The Nothing Generation"
9. "The Future is a War"
10. "With a Bullet"
