= Matt Freeman =

American bassist (born 1966)

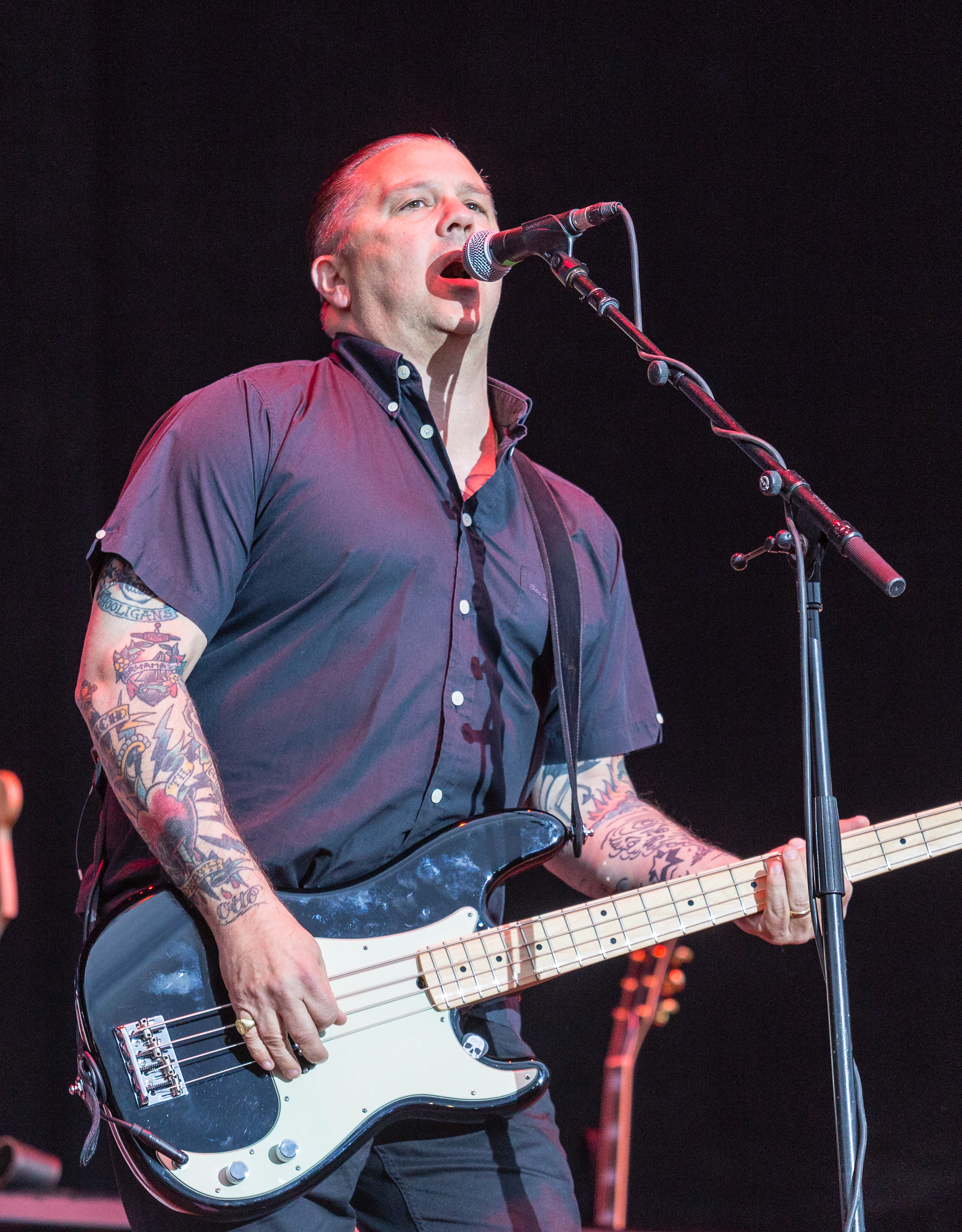
- Freeman performing in 2017

Background information
- Also known as: Matt McCall
- Born: Roger Matthew Freeman; April 23, 1966 (age 60)
- Origin: California, U.S.
- Genres: Punk rock; ska punk; street punk; hardcore punk; psychobilly
- Occupation: Musician
- Instruments: Bass guitar; vocals
- Years active: 1980–present

Roger Matthew Freeman, also known as Matt McCall, (born April 23, 1966) is an American musician best known as the bassist of punk rock band Rancid. After forming several bands with guitarist and vocalist Tim Armstrong in the late 1980s and early 1990s, including ska-punk pioneers Operation Ivy, he and Armstrong formed Rancid with drummer Brett Reed. The band's success helped revive mainstream interest in punk, and they have released ten albums since their formation. Freeman has several side projects as well, including Devil's Brigade, in which Freeman sings lead vocals and plays bass. Freeman's style is characterized by aggressive walking lines and fills, typically played on a Fender Precision Bass.

== Early life ==
Freeman began playing the trumpet during his youth, and later moved on to the baritone horn, and played trombone for a year, along with playing in jazz band.

At the age of five, Freeman met Tim Armstrong while playing Little League Baseball. They grew up a few blocks apart in Albany, California. Freeman and Armstrong formed bands many years later based on their shared love of bands such as the Clash and the Ramones. They both went to Albany High School.

== Musicianship ==
=== Playing style and influences ===
With Freeman on bass, Rancid is known for combining "high-energy punk with the infectious, quick-time bounce of second-wave ska". Freeman plays a fast-paced style, characterized by "aggressive walking lines and monstrous flatpicked fills", as opposed to mostly playing root notes like many punk bass players. Freeman began playing music at the age of seven, taking lessons and learning to read sheet music while playing in his high school jazz band. The Who's Live at Leeds inspired him to take up the bass, and he credits the Specials with turning him on to ska. Some of Freeman’s influences include John Entwhisle (The Who), John Doe from X, Horace Panter from The Specials and Graham Maby.

For his playing in Rancid and other bands, Guitar World dubbed him "one of punk's most iconic bassists", stating "Among punk-rock bass players, Freeman is a bit of an anomaly. His basswork on nascent punk anthems such as Maxwell Murder and the rolling ska grooves of Time Bomb set him far apart from the root-pounding horde."

=== Singing style ===
Although Armstrong and Frederiksen are the principal singers in Rancid, Freeman has taken the lead vocal duties in a number of gritty sounding songs through the years, including the songs "Black and Blue", "Rigged on a Fix", "Black Derby Jacket", "Tenderloin" and, "L.A. River". He is known for possessing a deep and raspy singing voice. Freeman was also the primary co-lead vocal for the first Rancid album, before Frederiksen joined the band, with his role subsequently being reduced by choice.

=== Gear ===
Freeman's main bass is a 1977 Fender Precision Bass he purchased for $400 in 1984. He generally prefers his instruments to be "players", rather than collector's pieces, because such basses are cheaper and more worn-in. Freeman owns multiple basses made in the mid-1960s to the late-1970s, including a 1974 Precision Bass from 1974, another from 1966, a few 1977 Fender Jazz Bssses, Rickenbacker 4003, and a 1978 Music Man StingRay. When writing songs, Freeman and Armstrong typically use acoustic instruments; for this, Freeman favors a Guild B-50 acoustic bass. He plays through an Ampeg B-15N amplifier for practices, but as it "does not like pedals", he also uses a Fender Bassman 100T head with a 1x15 cabinet.

== Music career ==
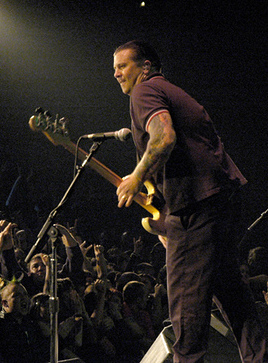
Freeman performing in 2007

=== Operation Ivy and Downfall ===
In May 1987, Freeman and Armstrong formed the band Operation Ivy. After Operation Ivy broke up in May 1989, they formed a new band, Downfall, which included all but one member of Operation Ivy and two additional members. Downfall recorded a 10-song album which has never been released, then broke up. Freeman and Armstrong next formed Generator, who played a number of shows, but are not known to have recorded anything. After that, Freeman played with the political punk band MDC for about a year.

=== Dance Hall Crashers ===
After Operation Ivy, Freeman and Armstrong formed the ska band the Dance Hall Crashers, but they left the band shortly after its formation. The band went on to become moderately successful throughout the 1990s.

=== MDC ===
He joined MDC in 1990, completing one US and one European tour and playing bass on their 1991 release Millions Of Dead Cops II: Hey Cop! If I Had A Face Like Yours.... The lineup for this version of the band consisted of Freeman, original singer Dave Dictor, original drummer Al Schvitz and guitarist Bill Collins, formerly of Fang, Special Forces and Intensified Chaos.

=== Gr'ups and Rancid ===
He joined the Gr'ups in 1991. In 1992, Freeman and Armstrong recruited drummer Brett Reed and formed Rancid. Rancid is his most successful band yet. He considered Rancid a side project until Armstrong had proved to him that he had his alcoholism under control. Guitarist Lars Frederiksen joined the band later in 1993. Rancid, would eventually go on to become one of the most critically acclaimed and commercially successful punk rock bands of all time. Rancid has released ten studio albums since their formation with their latest, Tomorrow Never Comes, being released in 2023. Their partnership has continued with Freeman contributing basslines to selected tracks by the Transplants, one of Armstrong's side projects.

=== Auntie Christ ===
In the late 1990s Freeman helped form the punk rock band, Aunite Christ led by singer and guitarist Exene Cervenka, alongside D.J. Bonebrake of the band X. They released one album in 1997.

=== Devils Brigade ===
In 2000 Freeman started Devils Brigade as a side project when he and longtime bandmate Tim Armstrong began writing songs together in between Rancid tours. While Freeman plays the electric bass guitar and sings backing and occasional lead vocals in Rancid, Devils Brigade would feature him on lead vocals and playing a double bass, incorporating elements of psychobilly into his usual punk rock repertoire. Their debut album Devils Brigade was released in 2010.

=== Social Distortion ===
During Rancid's 2004 hiatus, Freeman replaced bassist John Maurer in Social Distortion shortly before the release of their then-new album Sex, Love and Rock 'n' Roll. Freeman did not intend to stay in the band permanently and he was replaced by current bassist Brent Harding in late 2004.

=== Charger ===
In 2020 Matt formed a heavy metal band, Charger. The group consists of Freeman, Andrew McGee, and drummer Jason Willer, and are heavily influenced by Motörhead. The band was formed after Freeman wanted to play something beside punk and ska and Willer asked him "What do you like?’ Freeman replied " I like Motörhead and Black Sabbath. You want to play something like that? That would be fucking fun." Their debut album Warhorse was released in 2022.

=== The Crew ===
In May 2021, Freeman along with fellow Rancid bandmate Tim Armstrong, Fletcher Dragge (Pennywise), Byron McCracken (Pennywise), and Mike Muir (Suicidal Tendencies) formed a punk rock supergroup called the Crew. The band's first single, "One Voice", was released on Epitaph Records.

=== Hellfire ===
In 2021, the California based metal band Hellfire recruited Freeman to fill in on recording sessions for their fourth studio album Reckoning which was released in 2022.

== Health issues ==
Following his departure from Social Distortion, Freeman was diagnosed with lung cancer in May 2005, but was dismissed as abnormal tissue growth and not terminal to his health in June 2005. He had been a smoker for 20 years but had quit, seemingly by coincidence, shortly prior to this. He learned to play the mandolin so he would have something to do with his hands as heard on the Lars Frederiksen and the Bastards album Viking.

== Discography ==
=== Operation Ivy ===
- Turn it Around compilation (1987)
- Hectic EP (1988)
- Energy (1989)

=== Downfall ===
- They Don't Get Paid, They Don't Get Laid, But Boy Do They Work Hard! compilation album (1989)
- Very Small World compilation album (1991)
- Can of Pork compilation album (1992)
- Later That Same Year – "My City"

=== MDC ===
- Millions of Dead Cops II (1991)

=== Rancid ===
- Rancid (1992)
- Rancid (1993)
- Radio Radio Radio (1993)
- Let's Go (1994)
- ...And Out Come the Wolves (1995)
- Life Won't Wait (1998)
- Rancid (2000)
- BYO Split Series Volume III (2002)
- Indestructible (2003)
- B Sides and C Sides (2008)
- Let the Dominoes Fall (2009)
- Honor Is All We Know (2014)
- Trouble Maker (2017)
- Tomorrow Never Comes (2023)

=== The Gr'ups ===
- The Gr'ups (1992)
- Vinyl Retentive compilation album (1993)

=== Auntie Christ ===
- Life Could Be a Dream (1997)

=== Devils Brigade ===
- "Stalingrad" / "Psychos All Around Me" 12" single (2003)
- "Vampire Girl" 12" ep (2005)
- Devils Brigade (2010)

=== Charger ===
- charger ep (2019)
- warhorse (2022)

=== hellfire ===
- reckoning (2022)
