= Brett Reed =

American musician (born 1972)

- Born: July 12, 1972 (age 53); United States
- Genres: Punk rock
- Occupation: Musician
- Instruments: Drums, guitar
- Years active: 1991–2006

Brett Reed (born July 12, 1972) is an American musician, best known as the original drummer for the punk rock bands Rancid and Devils Brigade. He joined Rancid in November 1991 and left 15 years later. He played on every Rancid release up to their 2003 album Indestructible. On November 3, 2006, his announcement of leaving Rancid was made public and he was replaced by Branden Steineckert. He has not been active in the music industry since this time.

He plays left-handed. He has also played acoustic guitar on a number of Rancid acoustic shows, but unlike drums, he plays guitar right-handed. He played drums on P!nk's Try This album.
