= Reject (EP) =

Reject 302164

EP by Anti-Flag / Against All Authority
- Released: 1996
- Genre: Punk rock
- Length: 12:29
- Labels: A-F Records; Records of Rebellion

Anti-Flag chronology
Die for the Government (1996)	Reject 302164 (1996)	North America Sucks!! (1996)

Against All Authority chronology
Destroy What Destroys You (1995)	Reject (1996)	All Fall Down (1998)

Reject is a 7 inch split EP by American punk rock band Anti-Flag and American ska punk band Against All Authority, released in 1996.

In Punk Planet, the reviewer stated that Anti-Flag played "energetic straight ahead punk with some pop hints", having "many great things to say". Against All Authority were "great at being a socio-political band while still keeping everything fun".

== Track listing ==
Side A (Anti-Flag)

1. "The Truth" – 2:32
  - Later released on Their System Doesn't Work for You
2. "Anti-Violent" – 2:57
  - Later released on Their System Doesn't Work for You
3. "Daddy Was a Rich Man Part II" – 1:10
  - Condensed version of the track off Die for the Government

Side B (Against All Authority)

1. "Nothing To Lose" – 2:04
  - Later released on 24 Hour Roadside Resistance
2. "When It Comes Down" – 1:35
  - Later released on Nothing New for Trash Like You
3. "Haymarket Square" – 2:08
  - Later released on Nothing New for Trash Like You
