= Plea for Peace (EP) =

EP by Operation Ivy
- Released: February 1992
- Recorded: August 24, 1987 at 924 Gilman Street in Berkeley, California-November 30, 1987 at Dangerous Rhythm in Oakland, California
- Genre: Hardcore punk, ska punk
- Length: 7:54
- Language: English
- Label: M&E
- Producer: Tim Armstrong, Kevin Army

Operation Ivy chronology
Energy (1989)	Plea for Peace (1992)	'69 Newport (1993)

Plea for Peace is the final EP by the American punk rock band Operation Ivy. It was released in February 1992, three years after they disbanded, through M&E Records. Plea for Peace contained four songs not featured on any of Operation Ivy's studio releases.

== Production ==
The production of Plea for Peace was spearheaded by longtime fan and East Bay local Eric Yee. He approached various people for funds to produce a record of unreleased songs he had heard through Operation Ivy vocalist Jesse Michaels on cassette tape. He initially approached Murray Bowles, a long time scene veteran and photographer and Joel Wing, a local musician, who played in various East Bay bands such as Corrupted Morals and Dance Hall Crashers. The first side of the EP were recorded by Brian Edge at 924 Gilman Street on August 24, 1987, while the songs on the second side were outtakes from Hectic and were recorded on November 30, 1987 at Dangerous Rhythm in Oakland, California.

== Track listing ==
All lyrics are written by Jesse Michaels, except where noted; all music is composed by Operation Ivy, except where noted.

Side one
No.	Title	Length
1.	"Uncertain"	2:31
2.	"Troublebound" (written by Dave Alvin; originally performed by The Blasters)	1:47
Total length:		4:18

Side two
No.	Title	Length
1.	"Someday"	1:37
2.	"Plea for Peace"	1:59
Total length:		3:36

== Personnel ==
- Jesse Michaels - lead vocals
- Lint - guitar, backing vocals
- Matt McCall - bass, backing vocals
- Dave Mello - drums

Additional musicians

- Pat Mello - backing vocals

Production

- Tim Armstrong - producer
- Kevin Army - producer, engineer, mixing
- Brian Edge - recording
- Jesse Michaels - cover art
- Eric Yee - artwork
