= Night swimming =

Night swimming, nightswimming, Night Swim or Nightswim may refer to:

== Music ==
=== Records ===
- Night Swimming (EP), 2012 EP, the debut record of Young Lyre
- Night Swimming (album), 2018 album by Dentist
- Night Swim (album), the debut studio album by Josef Salvat

=== Songs ===
- "Nightswimming", a song by R.E.M. from the 1992 album Automatic for the People
- "Night Swimming", a 2012 song by Young Lyre known as the title track of the eponymous EP Night Swimming (EP)
- "Night Swimming", a song by Tacocat from the 2016 album Lost Time
- "Night Swimming", a 2018 song by Dentist known as the title track off the eponymous album Night Swimming (album)

== Other uses ==
- Night Swim, a 2024 horror film
- "Nightswimming" (Awake episode), the 2012 season 1 episode 8 of U.S. police fantasy drama TV show Awake
- Nightswim, real name Fin Leavell, a musician
