= Classics of Love =

American punk rock band

- Origin: Emeryville, California, United States
- Genres: Punk rock, Hardcore punk, ska punk
- Years active: 2008–2012, 2020-present
- Label: Asian Man
- Members: Jesse Michaels; Sharif Dumani; Peter John Fontes
- Past members: Mike Huguenor; Morgan Herrell; Max Feshbach
- Website: myspace.com/classicsofloveband

Classics of Love is an American punk rock band from the San Francisco Bay Area, formed in 2008. The band was together until 2012 and consisted of singer Jesse Michaels (formerly of Operation Ivy, Big Rig, and Common Rider) with guitarist Mike Huguenor, bassist Morgan Herrell, and drummer Max Feshbach (who comprise San Jose punk trio Hard Girls). Signed to Asian Man Records, Classics of Love released their debut, the Walking in Shadows EP, in 2009, followed by a single in 2010 and an eponymously titled album in 2012.

The band's music goes back to while Michaels was doing solo acoustic shows and was approached by Mike Park of Asian Man Records about recording the songs in a studio. Michaels decided to do the recordings with a full band and recruited Feshbach, Herrell, and Huguenor. The group named themselves Classics of Love (a name known from the opening track of Last Wave Rockers, recorded by Jesse Michaels' band Common Rider) and recorded the six song EP "Walking in Shadows".

After playing initial shows in California, the band went on a European tour in the spring of 2009. While playing in Southampton, United Kingdom they had equipment stolen from them. The band announced that when they returned from Europe they planned on starting writing on a full-length album.

Their first album was released on February 14, 2012. The album was self-titled and featured the same lineup as their EP.

The band became less active due to lead singer Jesse Michaels attending school in Los Angeles, but assured fans they were not broken up. For a period, Michaels referred to the band in the past tense, calling them "a band I was in".

In July 2020, Jesse Michaels released a new EP, World of Burning Hate, under the Classics of Love name, with permission from the other members of the band. Featuring Sharif Dumani (Alice Bag, Exploding Flowers) on guitar and bass, and Peter John Fontes (Los Nauticals) on drums, the EP is more of a straight hardcore style than the punk-ska of their self-titled album.

== Members ==
=== Current ===
- Jesse Michaels – vocals
- Sharif Dumani – guitar, bass
- Peter John Fontes – drums

=== Former ===
- Mike Huguenor – guitar
- Morgan Herrell – bass
- Max Feshbach – drums

== Discography ==
- Walking in Shadows EP (2009)
- "World of the Known" / "Line Through Your Name" (2010)
- Classics of Love (2012)
- World of Burning Hate (2020)
