= Expansivity =

Expansivity may refer to:

- Expansive homeomorphism
- Expansive Poetry
- Expansive clay
- Expansive Catasetum
- Expansive drill bit
- Expansive Heart

== See also ==
- Expansion (disambiguation)
