= The Criminals (band) =

American punk rock band

- Origin: Berkeley, California, U.S.
- Genre: Punk rock
- Years active: 1994–2000, 2012 (reunion)
- Labels: Recess, Lookout, New Disorder Records, Adeline Records, Sub City
- Spinoffs: The Frisk
- Past members: Jesse Luscious; Mike Sexxx; Freud RIP; Ross the Boss; Claudia Bitter; Snapper; Dan Ger; Brady Caesar; Julie Thorn; Zach Attack; Markley Hart; Nice Guy Brandon Polk
- Website: The Criminals on Facebook

The Criminals are an American punk rock band from Berkeley, California, originally existing from 1994–2000 and reforming in 2012. The lineup has consisted of lead vocalist Jesse Luscious and bass guitarist Mike Sexxx throughout the bands' existence. The Criminals have released two studio albums, Never Been Caught (1997) on Lookout! Records and Burning Flesh and Broken Fingers (1999) on Adeline Records. Following their initial breakup in 2000, members went on to form the Frisk.

== History ==
=== Formation, early releases and touring (1994–1997) ===
The Criminals formed in late 1994 with Jesse Luscious (vocals) and Mike Sexxx (bass), as well as vocalist Claudia Bitter, guitarist Freud RIP and drummer Ross the Boss. Initially, The Criminals sound was in a similar vein of Luscious' previous bands Blatz and The Gr'ups, which were also aggressively fronted, male/female dual-vocal punk rock bands. They issued the 7" vinyl release Seven Months Drunk and Bitter on Seattle's Hairhurt Records, with cover art by Janelle Hessig, known for producing the Tales of Blarg zine. Bitter left the band to move back to El Paso, Texas prior to seeing a release.

The Criminals continued as a four-piece and in early 1995 embarked on their first West Coast tour with Area 51, who would eventually become The Murder City Devils. They played the Los Angeles area frequently with the likes of the Quincy Punx and I Spy, courtesy of friend and former F.Y.P bassist Jed Schipper. Shortly after, the band was offered a release on Recess Records, a label run by Todd Congelliere (also of F.Y.P), which would result in The Criminals 10", recorded in August 1995 at Polymorph Studios in Oakland, California by Noah Landis. The release would include a cover of "Private Affair," originally performed by The Saints. The Criminals toured behind the release in the summer of 1996. Ross left the band to focus on his grindcore bands (Skaven, followed by Medication Time) and was temporarily replaced by Snapper, until he too became homesick and moved back to his native Grand Rapids, Michigan.

The Criminals found their next drummer Dan Ger, and made another lineup change following the band's 1996 summer tour, when Freud was kicked out and replaced by guitarist Brady Caesar. They continued to tour the US and Canada that year. This lineup would record and release The Criminals' debut album, Never Been Caught issued on Lookout! Records. The album was recorded at Catbox Studios in Oakland, California in January 1997 and was engineered by Billie Joe Armstrong, with cover art by Jesse Michaels. The song "Parlez-Vous Fuk You?" was re-recorded for the album, despite originally appearing on the bands' self-titled release.

=== Burning Flesh and initial breakup (1998–2000) ===
In April 1998 The Criminals recorded the EP Tomorrow's Too Late, released on New Disorder Records later that year. The band had yet another drummer change when they recruited Julie Thorn, formerly of The Hi-Fives. The Criminals returned to Catbox Studios in the spring of 1999 to record their second album, Burning Flesh and Broken Fingers. The band again worked with Armstrong, who recorded the session and released it on his recently launched Adeline Records. The song "Whiskey Business" was co-written with Matt Freeman. Following the album's release, Caesar left the band to focus on Black Cat Music and was replaced with guitarist Zach Attack. The band backed the release with a US tour featuring Blanks 77 and L.E.S. Stitches. Several unreleased songs from the Burning Flesh sessions would see later release on Exchange, a split release with Against All Authority.

The Criminals played their final show on January 29, 2000 at 924 Gilman Street in Berkeley, California with The Hi-Fives. They issued the posthumous EP Extinct on F.O.A.D. Records in 2001. The recording took place in December 1999, just before the band's dissolution and included re-recorded versions of "The Angry Ouija Board Has Sent Us to Destroy the City of Berkeley California So Run for Your Fucking Life" and "You Stupid Fuk," as well as a cover of "You Shook Me All Night Long," originally performed by AC/DC.

== Post breakup and reunion ==
Following The Criminals demise in early 2000, members went on to form The Frisk. The lineup included drummer Hunter Burgan, who has also been the bassist for AFI since 1997. The Frisk issued two releases on Adeline Records, who had previously released The Criminals final studio album, before disbanding in 2005.

In early 2012, The Criminals reformed as a four-piece and participated in the 1-2-3-4 Go! Records Celebration Night No. 1 with American Steel, Dead to Me and Vanna Inget on May 24, 2012. The band went on to play The Fest in Gainesville and Awesomefest in San Diego, along with 924 Gilman Street, all in 2012. The main difference between this and any other incarnation is that while Jesse Luscious and Brady Ceasar are still in the band, this lineup features new bassist Nice Guy Brandon from Scattered Fall and drummer Markley Hart from Econochrist.

In 2013, the band has booked 1 show at Eli's Mile High Club in October with new drummer Frank Piegaro of The Degenerics, Ensign, Star Fucking Hipsters, and Love Songs. More dates are pending. The Criminals next show was January 17, 2014 at The Hemlock Tavern in San Francisco with original San Francisco punk era band VKTMS.

On January 12, 2015, the Criminals announced their "last show ever". The show was on January 22, 2015 at the DNA lounge in San Francisco. Great Apes were opening and Jello Biafra DJ'd throughout the night. The Criminals include Jello's consigliere, Alternative Tentacles Records' Jesse Luscious.

== Former members ==
- Jesse Luscious – lead vocals (1994–2000, 2012)
- Mike Sexxx – bass (1994–2000, 2012)
- Freud RIP – guitar (1994–1996, 2012)
- Ross the Boss – drums (1994–1996)
- Claudia Bitter – lead vocals (1994–1995)
- Snapper – drums (1996)
- Dan Ger – drums (1996–1998)
- Brady Caesar – guitar (1996–1999, 2012)
- Julie Thorn – drums (1998–2000)
- Zach Attack – guitar (1999–2000)
- Markley Hart – drums (2012)

== Discography ==
=== Studio albums ===
Year	Album Details
1997	Never Been Caught: Released: April 22, 1997; Label: Lookout! Records (LK170); Formats: CD, LP
1999	Burning Flesh and Broken Fingers: Released: July 12, 1999; Label: Adeline Records (AR 004); Formats: CD, LP

=== Compilation albums ===
Year	Album Details
1999	The Criminals^{[I]}: Released: March 1999; Label: Recess Records (#59); Formats: CD, LP

- I Reissue of the band's first two EPs.

=== Extended plays ===
- Seven Months Drunk and Bitter (1995) Hairhurt Records
- The Criminals (1996) Recess Records
- Morning After (1997) Rhetoric Records
- Tomorrow's Too Late (1998) New Disorder Records
- Exchange (1999) Sub City (split w/ Against All Authority)
- Extinct (2001) F.O.A.D. Records

=== Compilation appearances ===
- (You're Only As Good As) The Last Great Thing You Did (1997) Lookout! Records
- Turn On, Tune In, Lookout! (1998) Lookout! Records
- A Little Something for Everyone (1998) New Disorder Records
- Forward Til Death (1999) Lookout! Records
- Short Music for Short People (1999) Fat Wreck Chords
- No Time To Kill (1999) Checkmate Records
- Might As Well... Can't Dance (1999) Adeline Records
