= Dental =

Dental may refer to:

- Dental consonant, in phonetics
- Dental Records, an independent UK record label
- Dentistry, oral medicine
- Teeth

== See also ==
- Dental care (disambiguation)
- Dentist (disambiguation)
- Tooth (disambiguation)
