= Operation Ivy (band) =

American punk rock band

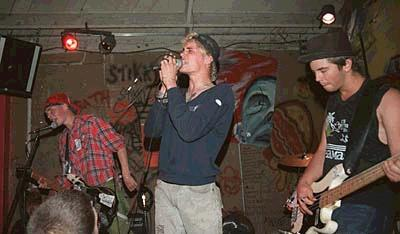
- Operation Ivy performing live at 924 Gilman Street in 1988

Background information
- Origin: Berkeley, California, U.S.
- Genre: Ska punk · punk rock · hardcore punk
- Years active: 1987–1989
- Labels: Lookout, Hellcat
- Spinoffs: Downfall; Rancid
- Past members: Jesse Michaels; Tim "Lint" Armstrong; Matt "McCall" Freeman; Dave Mello

Operation Ivy was an American punk rock band from Berkeley, California, formed in May 1987. They were critical to the emergence of Lookout Records and the so-called "East Bay Sound".

The band's name was derived from the Operation Ivy series of nuclear tests in 1952. Although the band released just one full-length album (Energy) before breaking up in May 1989, Operation Ivy is well remembered as the direct antecedent of popular band Rancid and for wielding a lasting stylistic influence over numerous other bands in what became the third wave ska movement.

== History ==
=== Formation ===
Operation Ivy was formed in May 1987 and was named after the code name of a 1952 American nuclear weapons testing program.

The band consisted of Jesse Michaels (lead vocals), Tim "Lint" Armstrong (guitar, vocals), Matt "McCall" Freeman (bass, vocals), and Dave Mello (drums). Prior to the formation of Operation Ivy, Armstrong and Freeman had played together in the Berkeley ska punk band Basic Radio.

Operation Ivy's first live performance was on May 27, 1987, in Dave Mello's garage. The next day began a tradition of performances at the Berkeley punk collective center 924 Gilman Street. Operation Ivy began playing a number of performances which led to its almost immediate cult-following.

After witnessing a live show in Southern California, Joy Aoki of Flipside Magazine described the energetic new band as a "swell bunch of guys" who "mix hard-edged ska with the intensity of young thrash".

=== Recordings ===
In October 1987, the band made its recording debut with two tracks on the Maximumrocknroll compilation album Turn It Around!, "I Got No" and "Officer".

In January 1988, the band signed to Lookout Records and released its debut 7-inch record, Hectic, which became one of Lookout's best-selling records. By this time, Operation Ivy, along with Crimpshrine and the Mr. T Experience, was one of the most successful bands from the punk scene at 924 Gilman Street. The band began playing a number of performances and embarked on a tour across the United States. By mid-1988, the group began selling out larger venues and the pressure to sign to major labels began to rise. With a budding reputation as an excellent live band, EMI offered Operation Ivy a major-label deal. Unsure of how to react to the prospect of success, because of both their independent politics and local-mindedness, the band chose to break up rather than compromise their intentions.

Operation Ivy released its only studio album, Energy, through Lookout in March 1989. The group broke up two months later in May, and its last official live performance was on May 28, 1989. This was also Green Day's first performance with the name Green Day at 924 Gilman Street, at what was supposed to have been Operation Ivy's record release party. Operation Ivy played one more unofficial performance the following day, mostly for friends and family, in Robert Eggplant's backyard in Pinole, California.

In two years, the band performed 185 shows and recorded a total of 32 songs (28 released officially, 4 on the bootlegged EP Plea for Peace), as well as songs which were recorded only as demos, such as "Hedgecore" (about a favorite pastime of the band which involved artfully jumping into manicured bushes), "Hangin' Out", "Sarcastic" and "Left Behind". Recordings from their aborted attempt to record Energy at 924 Gilman Street also exist, and include early versions of songs which appeared later on the final studio version of Energy, such as "6 to 10" which evolved into "Vulnerability", and an early version of "Unity" with horn accompaniment and a different chorus. All of its known demos and unreleased recordings are available on bootlegs.

=== Lyrical themes ===
The lyrics and tone of Operation Ivy's music portray a vociferous desire for social justice and a strong distrust of mainstream conformist culture.

=== Break-up and legacy ===
Operation Ivy broke up in May 1989.

In 1991, two years after the group's demise, Lookout Records released a compilation album of 27 tracks including Energy and Hectic in their entirety and the songs "Officer" and "I Got No" all the way to Turn It Around!. It was released as a complete discography (sometimes referred to as a re-release of Energy).

Although Operation Ivy released only one studio album, Energy, and had little mainstream success during its career, the band maintained a large underground cult following and influenced numerous bands. The album was certified gold by the RIAA on August 8, 2003.

An array of artists have covered Operation Ivy songs, most of which are featured on a 1997 tribute album, Take Warning: The Songs of Operation Ivy. Included are recordings by such bands as Long Beach Dub All Stars covering "Take Warning", Reel Big Fish covering "Unity", Blue Meanies covering "Yellin' in My Ear", Cherry Poppin' Daddies covering "Sound System", the Hippos covering "Freeze Up" and the Aquabats with a "campfire-style" cover of "Knowledge".

Other bands to cover Operation Ivy songs include a rendition of "Healthy Body" by Area-7, "Smiling" by Goldfinger, "Sound System" by Buck O Nine, "Caution" by No Trigger and more covers of "Knowledge" by both Millencolin and Evergreen Terrace. Link 80 was known to cover "I Got No", "The Crowd" and "Room Without a Window" (which appeared on their first demo, recorded at Gilman). Hollywood Undead released a cover of the song "Bad Town" in 2010, Green Day recorded a cover of the Operation Ivy song "Knowledge" for its extended play Slappy which was later released on the compilation album 1,039/Smoothed Out Slappy Hours. Green Day have continued to play the song live (where the band picks members out of the audience to play its instruments). Additionally, Rancid have played Operation Ivy songs at its live performances. In October 2015, Leftöver Crack, a band heavily influenced by Operation Ivy, were joined by Jesse Michaels for performances of "Sound System" and "Unity". Armstrong also joined Boston ska band Big D and the Kids Table for a performance of "Sound System" in Montreal.

Laura Jane Grace (formerly Against Me!) and Catbite performed a full set of Operation Ivy songs in September 2024 at the Supernova International Ska Festival. A recording of 27 songs was made at a secret Riot Fest Afterparty at The Empty Bottle in Chicago, IL on Sept 21, 2024 and released in January 2025: "Operation Ivy: Live at the Empty Bottle."

=== Subsequent careers ===
Two of the band's members, Armstrong and Freeman, have performed with the bands Rancid, The Ljs, Dance Hall Crashers, Generator, Basic Radio, Downfall, Devil's Brigade, Shaken 69 and Transplants. Additionally, Freeman has performed with Auntie Christ, MDC and Social Distortion. Armstrong also has begun releasing music under the moniker Tim Timebomb.

Drummer Dave Mello went on to perform in the punk band Schlong with his brother Pat Mello (bass) and singer Gavin MacArthur (guitar). He is currently drumming in the punk band Kicker from Oakland California, replacing previous drummer Toby Bitter (known best for being in the bands Filth, Impulse Items, and Submachine).

Michaels eventually resurfaced with a project band, Big Rig, which released a four-song EP titled Expansive Heart. In 1999 he formed Common Rider, which included bassist Mass Giorgini (producer and bassist for Squirtgun) and drummer Dan Lumley (of Squirtgun and Screeching Weasel, among others). Common Rider released a seven-inch EP and two studio albums and toured nationwide before disbanding in 2003. B-sides from its second album This Is Unity Music were used in a split EP with the Florida skacore band Against All Authority.

In 2008, Michaels collaborated with the indie/punk group Hard Girls to form a punk band called Classics of Love (who were named after a Common Rider song). The band plays traditional punk rock with Michaels serving as the band's lead vocalist. They released a 6-song EP released on Asian Man Records in 2009, and a full-length record (also with Asian Man Records) in 2012.

=== Leaving Lookout ===
On May 4, 2006, it was announced that Energy had officially been removed from Lookout Records' catalog. The album had been one of the label's best-selling albums, after Green Day's first two albums. Operation Ivy followed bands such as Green Day, Screeching Weasel, The Queers, and Ted Leo and the Pharmacists in leaving Lookout and taking back the rights to their back catalog due to unpaid royalties.

The 1991 compilation Operation Ivy was later reissued on November 6, 2007, by Epitaph Records subsidiary Hellcat Records as a self-titled compilation album. Hellcat Records is former band member Tim Armstrong's label. While the Epitaph reissue's track list is identical to the 1991 Lookout release, the 2007 re-release features remastered audio and new Digipak packaging. Hellcat re-issued the original versions of both Energy and Hectic on red and clear vinyl in April 2012.

Operation Ivy is featured in the 2017 documentary Turn It Around: The Story of East Bay Punk.

=== Reunions ===
The group has stated a number of times that an Operation Ivy reunion is unlikely to happen. Michaels addressed reunion issues in a Myspace blog citing the legal and logistic difficulties in getting the four members together for a reunion, as well as the fact that the band "never belonged in a big rock club in a one to two thousand seat joint." He concluded the post with the following: "[Will] it happen? The most honest answer is probably not." Michaels' sentiment was later echoed by Tim Armstrong:

I love what we did back then, but what we do now is move forward.... To go back 20 years wouldn't feel right. I'm super proud of what we did then, a big part of me is in that band. But it's always about the future for me.

During Rancid's US tour in 2006, Armstrong and Freeman played select tracks from their previous band's catalog. At a performance at the Warfield Theatre in San Francisco on December 17, 2006, Michaels reunited with Armstrong and Freeman to perform the tracks "Unity" as well as "Sound System". It was his first time on stage with the two in over 15 years.

In 2013 and for the first time in 24 years, Michaels and Armstrong (under the name Tim Timebomb) recorded a song together when Michaels appeared on "Living in a Dangerous Land", a song Armstrong released as part of his Tim Timebomb and Friends series.

In March 2023, Armstrong and Michaels along with Circle Jerks drummer Joey Castillo formed the band Bad Optix and released their first single "Raid". Less than a week after announcing the formation of the band, the band changed their name to DOOM Regulator.

== Members ==
- Jesse Michaels – lead vocals
- Tim "Lint" Armstrong – guitar, backing and lead vocals
- Matt "McCall" Freeman – bass, backing vocals
- Dave Mello – drums, backing vocals

=== Cameo studio appearance ===
- Pat Mello – backing vocals
- Paul Bae (credited as Paulbany) – saxophone, backing vocals

== Discography ==
=== Albums and EPs ===
Year	Title	Label	Other information
1988	Hectic	Lookout Records	Debut EP (6 songs)
1989	Energy	Lookout Records	Original 19-song LP
1991	Operation Ivy	Lookout Records	27-song compilation including Energy, Hectic and tracks from Turn It Around
1992	Plea for Peace	M&E Records	Final EP (4 songs)
1993	'69 Newport	Very Small Records	7" 45 RPM (2 songs)
1996	Seedy	Karma Kredit	Rarities Compilation (11 songs)

=== Compilation appearances ===
Year	Song title	Album title	Label
1987	"Officer", "I Got No"	Turn It Around!	Maximumrocknroll
1988	"Hangin' Out"	The Thing That Ate Floyd	Lookout Records
1989	"Officer"	Gilman St. Block Party	For the Fans by the Fans
2004	"Unity"	Rock Against Bush, Vol. 2	Fat Wreck Chords
