= Greyfield (band) =

American pop punk band

Background information
- Origin: Jacksonville, Florida, U.S.
- Genres: Pop punk, rock
- Years active: 2001–2005, 2012-present
- Labels: DIY, Search & Rescue Records
- Members: Christopher Miller; Fin Leavell; Matthew Quitter; Michael Crews
- Website: GreyfieldRock.com

Greyfield is an American pop punk band from Jacksonville, Florida, founded by Christopher Miller, Fin Leavell, Michael Crews, and Matthew Quitter. They have released one EP internationally on Search & Rescue Records (Ann Arbor, Michigan), as well as two more DIY within the United States.

== History ==
=== Starting out ===
Fin Leavell and Michael Crews asked Christopher Miller to start a band, he agreed, and they recorded a demo song, "How Could I?" at local recording studio Hole of the Pigeon.

The band quickly wrote a b-side for How Could I? and played their first show on September 23, 2001, consisting of both songs being played twice. Fin had just returned from tour with his other punk band, Against All Authority.

They booked time at a local recording studio, Hole of the Pigeon, immediately.

What became of this session was their first release, Party After the Show.

=== Touring ===
Greyfield spent most of their time between January 2002 and March 2003 touring the United States. They've shared the stage with such bands as Goldfinger, Story of the Year, Taking Back Sunday, Bigwig, Voodoo Glow Skulls, Riddlin' Kids, Don't Look Down, Plain White T's, Glasseater, Atom & His Package, Dynamite Boy, and countless others.

=== Recording ===
In the spring of 2002, Greyfield recorded their second release called Soundtrack To The Summer. It is the only international release to date. Work began late 2002 on their third release, The Tito Sessions. This was released on Valentine's Day of 2003. In late 2005 work began on a fourth release, Waterfalls In Outer Space - but the sessions were all but lost.

=== Recent History ===
The band convened in 2012 to play a reunion show. They are currently writing and recording for a proper release.

== Band members ==
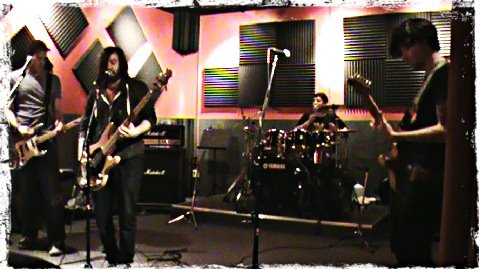
Greyfield, 2012

- Christopher Miller - vocals, bass
- Fin Leavell - electric guitar, vocals, bass, percussion
- Matthew Quitter - electric guitar, acoustic guitar
- Michael Crews - drums, percussion

Touring members:

- Mark McHone - bass (2002)

== Discography ==
=== EPs ===
- Party After the Show, recorded October–November 2001 (released Dec. 4, 2001)
- Soundtrack to the Summer, recorded April–June 2002 (released Aug. 6, 2002)
- Soundtrack to the Summer, Search & Rescue Records (released Feb. 2, 2003 - USA; Mar. 13, 2003 - JAPAN)
- The Tito Sessions, (released Feb. 14, 2003)
- Waterfalls In Outer Space, recorded 2005 (unreleased)
- The Tito Sessions, (re-released December 11, 2020)

=== Compilation Appearances ===
- Get Off the Couch! Vol. 1, Burning Couch Records, contributed "Note To Self" (released Oct. 26, 2002)

=== Soundtrack appearances ===
- Losers of the Year, Edgewater Pictures, contributed "Turn Off the Sunlight" (released Mar. 1, 2005)
