= Dentist (disambiguation) =

A dentist is a practitioner of dentistry—a branch of medicine pertaining to the oral cavity.

Dentist may also refer to:

- The Dentists, a British band active from 1984 to 1995
- The Dentist, a 1996 horror film
  - The Dentist 2, the sequel to the aforementioned film
- The Dentist (1932 film), a comedic short starring W. C. Fields
- "Dentist", an episode of the animated series Adventure Time
- Dentist (band), an American rock band
  - Dentist (album)
- Dentist!, a song from Little Shop of Horrors
