= All Fall Down (Against All Authority album) =

Studio album by Against All Authority
- Released: January 13, 1998
- Recorded: 1997
- Genres: Ska punk, hardcore punk
- Length: 28:56
- Label: Hopeless

Against All Authority chronology
Destroy What Destroys You (1996)	All Fall Down (1998)	Exchange (1999)

Professional ratings
Review scores
Source	Rating
AllMusic	3/5 stars
Maximum Rocknroll	
Ox-Fanzine	

All Fall Down is the second studio album by American ska punk band Against All Authority. The album was released in 1998.

== Track listing ==
1. "All Fall Down" – 2:11
2. "12:00 AM" – 2:38
3. "Justification" – 2:16
4. "Keep Trying" – 1:47
5. "At Our Expense" – 2:15
6. "Stand in Line" – 2:03
7. "Toby" – 1:16
8. "We Don't Need You" – 1:33
9. "The Mayhem & the Pain" – 1:51
10. "Louder Than Words" – 2:02
11. "What the Fuck'd You Expect?" – 2:15
12. "Daddy's Little Girl" – 1:21
13. "Sk8 Rock" – 1:39
14. "Watered Down & Passive" – 1:59
15. "When the Rain Begins to Fall" – 1:50

Artwork by Omar Angulo

== Legal problems ==
In the inlay of this CD, there is a scanned letter from the American Automobile Association (from 1998). Their trademark consists of three As in an oval. They complained to Hopeless Records that the logo Against All Authority uses is the same as theirs, and they threatened to sue the label.
After this, Against All Authority's logo was changed and previous CDs with the offending logo were replaced with the new one. However, in response to this argument, their next album was entitled 24 Hour Roadside Resistance, making fun of the American Automobile Association's slogan "24 Hour Roadside Assistance".
