= Common Rider =

American ska punk band

- Origin: Berkeley, California, U.S.
- Genres: Punk rock, reggae, indie rock, ska punk
- Years active: 1999–2003
- Labels: Lookout!, Hopeless
- Members: Jesse Michaels; Mass Giorgini; Dan Lumley

Common Rider was an American ska punk band, formed in 1999 by Jesse Michaels (guitar, vocals), Mass Giorgini (bass) and Dan Lumley (drums). The band's name is taken from a Japanese TV show, Kamen Rider (Kamen Rider means "Masked Rider" in Japanese).

== History ==
Michaels was formerly the lead vocalist for Operation Ivy, 1987 to 1989.

The band released two full-length albums and one EP. Last Wave Rockers was released in 1999 on Lookout! Records. Thief In a Sleeping Town EP was also released on Lookout! Records in 2001 and featured Billie Joe Armstrong of Green Day (guitar/backing vocals). The band released This Is Unity Music on Hopeless Records in 2002. The band toured the US extensively the same year, including the 2002 Plea For Peace tour, sponsored by Asian Man Records. On the tour, Phillip Hill (from Teen Idols and also a major contributor on the album This is Unity Music) played guitar, along with Joe Mizzi. The band's last release was a split with Against All Authority in April 2005, containing outtakes from 2002's This Is Unity Music.

The band broke up in 2003. In 2005, bassist and producer Mass Giorgini went to Australia to record an album for Brisbane-based reggae/ska outfit Scarred Hope; he has also performed with Dan Lumley in the band Squirtgun. Michaels has continued to perform sporadically and to produce art. In late 2008, Michaels emerged with a new band named Classics of Love, after the Common Rider song.

== Discography ==
=== Albums and EPs ===
Year	Title	Label	Other information
1999	Last Wave Rockers	Lookout! Records / Panic Button	Debut Album
2001	Thief in a Sleeping Town EP	Lookout! Records	7" vinyl with four songs, Billie Joe Armstrong from Green Day played guitar
2002	This Is Unity Music	Hopeless	Phillip Hill, Matt Demeester, Kevin Sierzega, Jimmy Lucido, Ray Moses, Joe Mizzi, members of Alkaline Trio, and many more, contributed to this record.
2005	Common Rider/Against All Authority split	Hopeless	Split EP with punk band Against All Authority containing four songs from the This Is Unity Music sessions that did not make it onto the record.

=== Compilations ===
Year	Title	Label	Contributing Track(s)
2000	Might As Well ... Can't Dance	Adeline Records	"Thief In A Sleeping Town"
2000	Lookout! Freakout	Lookout! / Panic Button	"Carry On", "Signal Signal (Alternative Version)"
2001	Lookout! Freakout - Episode 2	Lookout! / Panic Button	"Am I On My Own"
2002	Every Dog Will Have Its Day	Adeline Records	"Blackbirds vs Crows"
2002	Hopelessly Devoted To You - Volume 4	Hopeless	"Small Pebble"
2001	1157 Wheeler Avenue: A Memorial For Amadou Diallo	Failed Experiment	"Longshot"
2002	Plea For Peace / Take Action Volume 2	Sub City	"PSA" (Jesse Michaels only), "Longshot"
2003	Operation: Punk Rock Freedom	Hopeless/Sub City	"Firewall"
2004	Hopelessly Devoted To You - Volume 5	Hopeless	"Where The Waves Are Highest"
2006	Hopelessly Devoted To You - Volume 6	Hopeless	"Small Pebble"
2009	Hopeless Records: 15 Year Anniversary	Hopeless	"Small Pebble"
