= Plea for Peace =

Plea for Peace may refer to:

- Plea for Peace Foundation, a non-profit organization based in California
- Plea for Peace (EP), an EP by Operation Ivy
