= Energy (Operation Ivy album) =

Studio album by Operation Ivy
- Released: May 28, 1989
- Recorded: January–March 1989
- Studios: Sound and Vision (San Francisco)
- Genres: Ska punk; punk rock; hardcore punk
- Length: 36:48
- Labels: Lookout!; Hellcat
- Producers: Kevin Army; Operation Ivy

Operation Ivy chronology
Hectic (1988)	Energy (1989)	Plea for Peace (1992)

Energy is the only studio album by the American ska punk band Operation Ivy. It was released on vinyl and cassette in May 1989 through Lookout! Records with the catalog number LK 010. The album itself was eventually released on CD, all of the tracks were featured on the career-spanning compilation Operation Ivy issued by Lookout in 1991. Despite achieving no mainstream success, Energy is considered one of the most important albums of ska punk and is frequently cited as an influence by many later bands of the genre.

The album stayed in print on Lookout until 2006, when the band took back its recordings from the label due to unpaid royalties. Guitarist Tim "Lint" Armstrong's label Hellcat Records re-released the original album as a 12-inch LP picture disc in 2004, and in 2007 put out a remastered version of the self-titled compilation. A second vinyl edition was released by Hellcat on April 18, 2012, and debuted at number 13 on the Vinyl Albums chart.

== Background and recording ==
Shortly after returning from a short US tour in June 1988, the band played a show at Humboldt State University in Arcata, California with Crimpshrine, Isocracy and the Lookouts. Following the show, the band stopped at a local burrito shop with Lookout Records owners Larry Livermore and David Hayes to discuss future plans. Livermore and Hayes suggested recording a follow-up EP to their debut Hectic, but the band members revealed that they intended to do a full studio album. Figuring the band was not ready to record an album, and fearing that Lookout did not have enough money to put it out, Livermore and Hayes attempted to talk the band out of their decision, but to no avail. As guitarist Lint would later say, "You can tell Operation Ivy, but you can't tell 'em much."

The original intent was to record the album live at 924 Gilman Street during closed hours with minimal overdubs, with Gilman soundman Radley Hirsch as engineer. "I think they were hoping to capture the electricity and excitement of their live shows, a nice trick if you could manage it", Livermore later said. "But without an audience, Gilman was just a barn-like structure with mediocre acoustics. It lacked soundproofing, isolation booths, a control room and all those features." During recording, however, the band ran into a number of disagreements with Hirsch, such as not wanting Lint to use distortion on his guitar and having bassist Matt McCall use an Ampeg SVT amp that "sounded like Blue Cheer or something". The sessions dragged on for "what seemed like forever" due to the engineer's decision to record overdubs and weeks were spent working on single songs. Livermore was also dissatisfied with the recordings, saying "Some were as good or better than anything Lookout had done, but others just felt... weird." By December 1988, the members were unsure if they wanted to continue working on the album and arranged a band meeting to decide what to do. After agreeing to start over from scratch, Livermore was assigned with the task of firing Hirsch from the project and the band went to Sound and Vision Studios in San Francisco with Kevin Army in January 1989 to re-record the album. Recording went quickly during these sessions, with the band completing basic tracks for the entire album in one day. "It was a live recording, because we went in there and we just went down the list. We weren't really taking breaks at all," according to McCall. "We didn’t want to slow down, we just wanted to get it done because we were on a roll."

== Release ==
Once recording was finally finished, the band began working on artwork and packaging. Michaels drew the front cover and originally intended to put together the lyric sheet, but could not finish it before it was due and had Hayes take over. The album was finished in March and due for release two months later in May. As a celebration, Livermore and the band booked a record release party concert at Gilman on May 28 that also included Green Day, Surrogate Brains, Crimpshrine and the Lookouts on the bill, all of which also had records coming out. However, a few weeks before the concert, Lint and McCall went to see Livermore "looking utterly shell-shocked" and revealed that Michaels had decided to leave the group and that they intended to break up. "I remember me and Jesse, we were on Telegraph, I was buying him some beer", Lint later said. "Me and him talked about how the band wasn't really what it was when it started. It was like a mutual thing. That's one thing that's not usually told, it wasn't like he quit, it was like, ‘Yeah, we're not really into it anymore.'" As a result, the planned record release party became the band's last public performance. They later played one more private show the following day in Robert Eggplant's backyard in Pinole, California.

== Reception and legacy ==
Professional ratings
Review scores
Source	Rating
AllMusic	4/5 stars
Pitchfork	9.1/10

In a retrospective review, Adam Bregman of AllMusic considered Energy among the best albums of the ska punk genre. He praised the album for "succeed[ing] in combining all sorts of elements" and called it an "unsurpassed, highly intelligent, extremely fun record". In 2006, Energy was ranked as the highest rated punk album of 1989 and 6th highest rated ever on Sputnikmusic.

Many artists have covered the songs on Energy (and Hectic), including the tribute album Take Warning: The Songs of Operation Ivy. The Leftöver Crack song "Gay Rude Boys Unite" is a parody of "Unity" and the introduction music is deliberately similar to that of "Yellin' in My Ear". Split Lip's 1996 compilation album Archived Music for Stubborn People: Songs You May or May Not Have Heard Before included a cover of "Unity." Goldfinger covered the song "Smiling" on their live album Foot in Mouth. Hollywood Undead covered the song "Bad Town" on their album Desperate Measures. "Knowledge" has been covered by Green Day on their Slappy EP (later featured on the 1,039/Smoothed Out Slappy Hours collection) and Millencolin on their Skauch EP.

The American punk rock band Energy named themselves after this album.

== Certifications ==
Region	Certification	Certified units/sales
United States (RIAA)	Gold	500,000^{^}
^{^} Shipments figures based on certification alone.

== Track listing ==
All lyrics are written by Jesse Michaels, except where noted; all music is composed by Operation Ivy, except where noted.

Side one
No.	Title	Length
1.	"Knowledge"	1:42
2.	"Sound System"	2:14
3.	"Jaded" (chorus written by John Healy)	1:51
4.	"Take Warning"	2:44
5.	"The Crowd" (lyrics by Michaels and Lint)	2:11
6.	"Bombshell" (lyrics by Michaels and Lint)	1:03
7.	"Unity" (lyrics by Michaels and Lint)	2:13
8.	"Vulnerability"	2:00
9.	"Bankshot"	1:33
10.	"One of These Days" (written by Lee Hazlewood; originally performed by Nancy Sinatra)	1:07

Side two
No.	Title	Length
11.	"Gonna Find You"	1:54
12.	"Bad Town" (lyrics by Lint)	2:35
13.	"Smiling"	1:46
14.	"Caution"	1:28
15.	"Freeze Up"	2:20
16.	"Artificial Life" (lyrics by Michaels and Lint)	2:05
17.	"Room Without a Window"	1:32
18.	"Big City"	2:16
19.	"Missionary"	2:07
Total length:		36:48

== Personnel ==
Credits are adapted from the album's liner notes.

- Jesse Michaels – lead vocals, backing vocals on "Bad Town"
- Lint – guitar, backing vocals, lead vocals on "Bad Town"
- Matt McCall – bass, backing vocals
- Dave Mello – drums, backing vocals

Additional performers

- Pat Mello – backing vocals, "meditation instructor"
- Paul Bae (credited as Paul Bany) – saxophone, backing vocals

Production

- Kevin Army – production, engineering
- Operation Ivy – production
- John Golden – mastering
- Jesse Michaels – front cover, graphics, additional artwork
- Ken Coffelt – back cover photo
- Joy – photography
- Ian – photography
