= The Summer Obsession =

American band

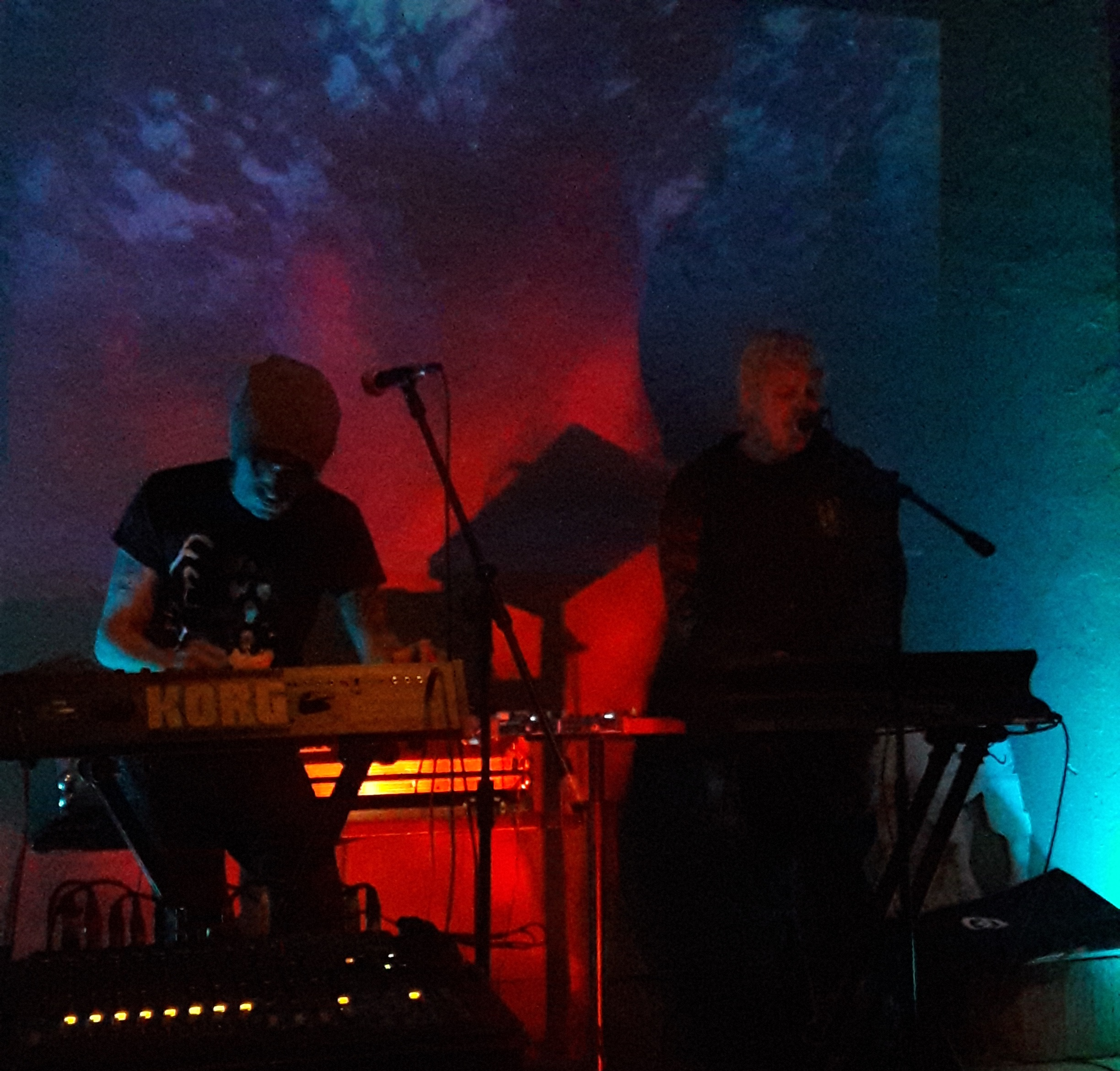
- TSO performing live in Portland, Oregon, in 2019

Background information
- Also known as: TSO; Bed Destroyers; Start Trouble; Trouble Is
- Origin: Jacksonville Beach, FL
- Genres: Electronic; Pop; Drum n bass; House; Electropop; lofi; pop punk (early work)
- Years active: 2004–present
- Labels: Virgin Records; Universal; EMI Music Japan; Myspace Records; Bullion Records; Sega; Galaxy Wide Records
- Members: Fin Leavell; Luke Walker; Chris Wilson
- Website: http://www.thesummerobsession.com

The Summer Obsession is an American punk rock band formed in 2004, known for mixing punk, hip hop, electronica, reggae, and many other genres.

== History ==
The band was originally formed in 2004 by Fin Leavell & Luke Walker, joined just a few months later by Chris Wilson. The band has toured with Cartel, Mýa, Story of the Year, Saosin, Sugarcult, The Click Five, Permanent Me, Hit the Lights, Houston Calls, Monty Are I, Against All Authority, Whole Wheat Bread, Plain White T's, and New Years Day. Two Types Of People was the first CD released by the outfit. The group was slated to play on dates of the 2004 Warped Tour, but their stage was cancelled; after finding this out, they moved to Los Angeles, where they landed a deal with Virgin Records. The group saw early exposure through MySpace, as founder Tom Anderson was an early for their music. Late in 2005, they appeared on a MySpace Records compilation.

This Is Where You Belong was their debut major label album, released in August 2006 on Virgin Records. They appeared on Cartoon Network's Fridays and performed the songs "Melt the Sugar" and "Disappear". They have also played in Japan on two occasions.

== Members ==
=== Current members ===
- Fin Leavell - vocals, guitar, & synthesizers (2004–present)
- Luke Walker - vocals, keyboards, bass, synthesizers, & guitar {2004–present)
- Chris Wilson - drums, guitar, & vocals (2005–present)

=== Former members ===
- Josh Freese - drums (2005)
- Chris Miller - bass (2006-2007)
- Ryland Steen - drums (2004-2005)

== Discography ==
=== Albums ===
- Two Types Of People (Download/DIY CD, June 4, 2004)
- This Is Where You Belong (CD, Virgin Records, August 29, 2006)
- This Is Where You Belong (Deluxe) (E-CD, EMI Music Japan, December 7, 2006)
- Believe Nothing Explore Everything (CD, Bullion Records/Sega, September 2, 2010)

=== EPs ===
- Magic Mountain Sessions EP (Download, April 20, 2005)
- The Seawalk Hotel EP (Download, November 16, 2005)
- TSO EP (CD, Virgin Records, March 30, 2006)
- We're Not Virgins Anymore EP (CD, January 30, 2007)
- Between the Sets EP (Download, May 30, 2007)
- The Salvia Sessions EP (Download, October 30, 2007)
- Allegiance To the Fire EP (Download, May 30, 2008)
- Believe Nothing Explore Everything EP (Download, March 30, 2010)

=== Band Compilations ===
- The Summer Obsession (CD, Bullion Records/Sega, January 19, 2011)
- This Is Where You Belong (Demos) (Download, Galaxy Wide Records, May 30, 2014)

=== Singles ===
- 8 AM (Download, May 15, 2004)
- I Miss You (Download, July 15, 2004)
- Down For Whatever (Download, September 12, 2004)
- Death Said (Download, Virgin Records, February 1, 2006)
- Bored (Download, Virgin Records, May 5, 2006)
- Do You Remember (CD, Virgin Records, June 20, 2006)
- Mary Jane (Download, November 16, 2007)
- Beautiful Tragedy (Download, February 15, 2008)
- We Are All Telepathic (Download, May 30, 2008)
- 2 Days (Download, March 30, 2010)
- I’m Alive (Download, September 2, 2010)

=== Soundtracks ===
- Maximum Ride: School's Out Forever Disappear and Death Said (CD, Little, Brown and Company, May 23, 2006)

=== Other Compilations ===
- Myspace Warped Tour Compilation 8 AM (CD, Myspace Records, July 15, 2004)
- Myspace Records Vol. 1 Compilation Melt the Sugar (CD, Myspace Records, November 15, 2005)
- Shout! Best of Loud Rock Compilation Do You Remember (CD, Universal, June 18, 2008)

=== Music Videos ===
- 8 AM (May 15, 2004, Directed by Luke & Fin)
- I Miss You (July 15, 2004, Directed by Luke & Fin)
- Down For Whatever (September 12, 2004, Directed by Luke & Fin)
- Death Said (February 1, 2006, Directed by Luke, Fin, & Rob Roy)
- Bored (May 5, 2006, Directed by Chris Bentley)
- Do You Remember (June 20, 2006, Directed by Zach Merck)
- Mary Jane (November 16, 2007, Directed by Luke)
- Beautiful Tragedy (February 15, 2008, Directed by Luke)

=== Webisodes ===
- The Blue Flame (3 episodes, 2004)
- Switching Signs (3 episodes, 2004)
- Dinosaur World (2 episodes, 2005)
- TSO FL Tour (1 episode, 2006)
- Mouth Is For Potty (4 episodes, 2006)
- TSO Goes To NY (1 episode, 2006)
- Allegiance To the Fire (2 episodes, 2008)
- Believe Nothing Explore Everything (3 episodes, 2009–2010)
- TSO in Duval (1 episode, 2010)
