= Greyfield =

Greyfield may refer to:

- Greyfield (band), a rock band from Jacksonville, Florida
- Greyfield (Camden County, Georgia), an estate on Cumberland Island, listed on the NRHP in Georgia
- Greyfield land, also greyfields, underused real estate assets, typically with empty asphalt areas
- Greyfield, Somerset, a hamlet in Southern England
