= Young Lyre =

- Origin: Auckland, New Zealand
- Genres: Indie rock; Indie pop; Synth Pop
- Years active: 2009–present
- Members: Jordan Curtis; Sanjay Bangs; Kiran Rai; Simon Roots; Matt Judd
- Website: younglyre.bandcamp.com

Young Lyre is an Indie Pop New Zealand band formed in 2009 from Auckland. The band includes Jordan Curtis (lead vocals, synths), Matt Judd (bass, backing vocals), Simon Roots (drums, backing vocals), Sanjay Bangs (guitar, synths), Kiran Rai (guitar, synths). The band's debut EP title Night Swimming was released in 2012 and was the number fifteen on the New Zealand Music chart. The band released their second EP, title Weekend in 2015. Young Lyre music style is often described as Indie Pop and Synth Pop.

== History ==
=== Formation ===
The band first formed in high school for the Rockquest under the name of "Sons of Darragh". After leaving high school they briefly changed name to "Oresund", and some time after, becoming "The Frisk". After leaving university, the band members decided that the band name would change for the last time, becoming "Young Lyre". In 2011, Young Lyre opened for international acts Green Day and Train.

=== 2011–present: Night Swimming and Weekend ===
In 2011, Young Lyre started working on their first EP alongside the release of their single "Cinema Smile" which premiered on the New Zealand television programme U Live. The band's first EP Night Swimming was released on November 9, 2012. The EP debuted at number fifteen on the Official New Zealand Music Chart a week after its release. Promoting the EP, the band performed at the Parachute festival on 2013.

In 2014 the band launched and completed a successful crowd funding campaign to help fund their second EP. In May 2015, after a long period of writing, released the single "We Go Faster", which was funded by NZ On Air. On November 27, 2015, Young Lyre released officially their second EP, title Weekend. The release was also funded by NZ On Air.

== Band members ==
- Jordan Curtis – lead vocals, synths (2008–present)
- Sanjay Bangs – guitar, backing vocals (2008–present)
- Kiran Rai – guitar, synths (2008–present)
- Simon Roots – drums (2008–present)
- Matt Judd – bass, backing vocals (2008–present)

== Discography ==
- Night Swimming -– EP (2012)
- Weekend – EP (2015)

Singles

Title	Year	Album
"Cinema Smile"	2011	Non-album single
"Make Light"	2012	Night Swimming
"We Go Faster"	2015	Weekend
