= Rat Boy =

English musician (born 1996)

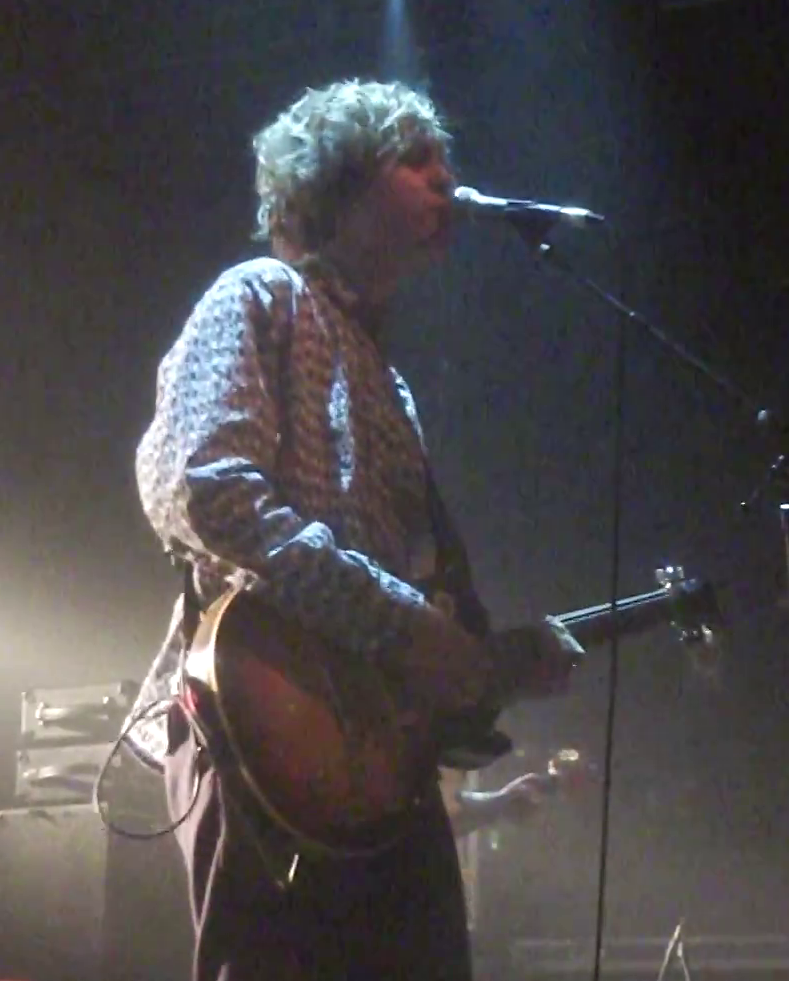
- Rat Boy performing in 2017

Background information
- Born: Jordan Cardy; February 21, 1996 (age 30); Chelmsford, Essex, England
- Genres: Indie rock; hip hop; punk-rap
- Occupations: Singer, songwriter, guitarist
- Years active: 2013–present
- Labels: Parlophone; Epitaph; Hellcat Records
- Member of: The Family Business Ltd
- Spouse: Lucy Cardy
- Website: ratboy.co.uk

Jordan Cardy (born 1996), known by his stage name Rat Boy, is an English musician from Chelmsford, Essex.

== Early life ==
Cardy was born in Chelmsford, England in 1996. He studied at Chelmer Valley High School in Chelmsford and went on to study art at Colchester Institute. He began writing songs in his spare time, releasing songs on SoundCloud under the name "Rat Boy", a name given to him by his school friends who claimed he looked like a rat. After college, Cardy was hired and subsequently fired from Wetherspoons, which provided inspiration for his first release on SoundCloud, The Mixtape.

== Career ==
Rat Boy produced The Mixtape, a 5-track mix on which he performed vocals, keyboard and bass, recorded in his own home. He sent The Mixtape to various record companies and in response Drew McConnell (bassist for Babyshambles) arranged for Rat Boy to have a meeting with him; Cardy and his band were subsequently signed to Parlophone in early 2015. In addition to this, The Mixtape was featured in NME magazine and played by radio stations including BBC Radio 1, Radio X (formerly XFM) and BBC Radio 6.

Rat Boy was added to the BBC Sound of 2016 Longlist, an annual poll in which over 100 music specialists select artists they believe will be successful within the next 12 months. In December 2015, MTV released its Brand New for 2016, an annually released article and webseries containing artists to watch out for during the upcoming year. Rat Boy was shortlisted along with 10 other artists including Bonkaz, Jack Garratt and Rationale. He was also nominated for Best New Artist 2016 by NME magazine, which he subsequently won, along with performing his single "Move" at the awards ceremony.

In April 2017, Cardy's song "Knock Knock Knock" was sampled on Kendrick Lamar's song "Lust", taken from the latter's fourth studio album, Damn. When he found out about the sample, he tweeted his appreciation for it.

On 11 August 2017, Rat Boy released his long-awaited debut album Scum to commercial success. The album was initially released with 13 tracks, however a deluxe 25-track version was also released. The deluxe version included more than 15 minutes of skits, samples and interludes, as well as an extra song "Sad Sad" featuring fellow indie musician Mallory Merk. The album reached No. 15 on the UK Albums Chart.

In December 2017, Cardy supported Liam Gallagher on his UK solo tour.

On 25 January 2019, Rat Boy released the studio album Internationally Unknown which was recorded in 2018.

Rat Boy featured on McFly's 2020 album Young Dumb Thrills on the song of the same title.

Rat Boy provided songs for the radio in the 2020 game Cyberpunk 2077 using the name IBDY. One song, "Who's Ready for Tomorrow", featured heavily in Cyberpunk: Edgerunners, the anime based in the same universe.

== Musical style ==
Rat Boy's music is an amalgamation of several styles, most notably hip hop and indie rock. He has cited English bands the Clash and the Streets as his main musical influences and has been compared to artists such as Jamie T and the Beastie Boys. He is also a fan of Kendrick Lamar and Kasabian. Cardy has a DIY approach to his art and music, generally recording and producing his own tracks at home and creating all his own album art. Many of Cardy's songs consist of narratives and stories within the lyrics, as well as samples recorded of sounds and conversations from his daily life.

== Discography ==
=== Studio albums ===
- Scum (2017) - UK No. 15
- Internationally Unknown (2019)
- Suburbia Calling (2024)
- CRASH! (2026)

=== EPs and mixtapes ===
- The Mixtape (2014)
- Neighbourhood Watch (2015)
- Get Over It (2016)
- Civil Disorder (2018)
- Government Vacation (2020)

=== Singles ===
List of singles, with selected chart positions, showing year released
Title	Year	Peak chart positions	Album
Title	Year	UK Vinyl	Album
"Sign On"	2015	1	Scum
"Fake ID"	2015	4	Scum
"Move"	2016	5	Scum
"Get Over It"	2016	—	Scum
"Cash in Hand"	2016	—	Get Over It EP
"Lovers Law"	2016	—	Non-album single
"Revolution"	2017	—	Scum
"Laidback"	2017	—	Scum
"Be My Anime"	2018	—	Civil Disorder
"Asthma"	2019	—	Non-album single
"Truth of the Youth"	2019	—	Government Vacation
"Money on Dust"	2020	—	Non-album singles
"Brave New World"	2020	—	Non-album singles
"Curtain Calling"	2021	—	Non-album singles
"Ram Raid"	2022	—	Non-album singles
"Suburbia Calling"	2024	—	Suburbia Calling
"One In A Million"	2024	—	Suburbia Calling
"—" denotes a recording that did not chart or was not released in that territory.

=== Music videos ===
- "Sign On" (2015)
- "Fake ID" (2015)
- "Wasteman" (2015)
- "Move" (2016)
- "Get Over It" (2016)
- "Revolution" (2017)
- "I H8 U" (2017)
- "Laidback" (2017)
- "Knock Knock Pt II" (2018)
- "Internationally Unknown" (2018)
- "Chip on My Shoulder" (2018)
- "Don't Hesitate" (2019)
- "Truth of the Youth" (2019)
- "Rewind" (2020)
- "Victim of a System" (2020)
- "Brave New World" (2020)
- "Suburbia Calling" (2024)
- "One In A Million" (2024)
- "Badman" (2024)
- "BROKEN" (2026)

== Tours ==
- The Dumb & Confused Tour (2018)

== Awards and nominations ==
Awards and nominations for Rat Boy
Year	Award	Category	Recipients and nominees	Result
2016	BBC Sound of 2016	Best New Act	Rat Boy	Nominated
2016	MTV Brand New	Best New Act	Rat Boy	Nominated
2016	NME Awards	Best New Artist	Rat Boy	Won
2017	NME Awards	Best Video	Rat Boy	Nominated
