= Weekend (EP) =

EP by Young Lyre
- Released: 27 November 2015
- Recorded: 2014
- Genre: Indie pop; Synth pop
- Length: 20:14
- Language: English

Young Lyre chronology
Night Swimming (2012)	Weekend (2015)

Weekend is the second studio EP of New Zealand band Young Lyre, released on 25 November 2015.

== Background ==
In the 2011, the band released their first EP, title Night Swimming. After a long period of tour and festivals, the band started to produce their second EP. On 24 May 2014, the band started their crowd funding campaign to help funding their second EP. The campaign of $2,000 meet its goal on 21 February 2015 with the total of $2,135. The EP was officially released on 27 November 2015.

== Singles ==
The first single from the album, was "We Go Faster" released on 10 May 2015. The music video to the video was crowdfunded alongside the album production. Also they received the help to fund the video and the album by a New Zealand project called NZ On Air.

== Track listing ==
All tracks are written by Young Lyre.

No.	Title	Length
1.	"Ski Mantra"	4:28
2.	"We Go Faster"	3:57
3.	"Winter"	3:39
4.	"Don't Forget"	4:17
5.	"Weekend"	3:53
Total length:		20:14

== Personnel ==
Young Lyre

- Jordan Curtis – lead vocals, synths
- Sanjay Bangs – guitar, synths
- Kiran Rai – guitar, synths
- Simon Roots – drums, backing vocals
- Matt Judd – bass, backing vocals

Technical

- Greg Haver – producer on "We Go Faster", recording
- Simon Gooding – producer on "We Go Faster", mixing
- Nick Poortman – recording
- Joe LaPorta – mastering
- Winston Shacklock – Album art, layout
