= Against All Authority / Common Rider =

Common Rider/Against All Authority Split

EP by Against All Authority/Common Rider
- Released: April 12, 2005
- Genres: Punk rock, ska punk
- Label: Hopeless

Against All Authority chronology
Nothing New for Trash Like You (2001)	Common Rider/Against All Authority Split (2005)	The Restoration of Chaos & Order (2006)

Professional ratings
Review scores
Source	Rating
NeuFutur	(6.7/10)

Common Rider/Against All Authority Split is a split album featuring songs by American bands Against All Authority and Common Rider.

== Track listing ==
1. "Lied To" (Against All Authority)
2. "War Machine Breakdown" (Against All Authority)
3. "Barricades" (Against All Authority)
4. "World Dominator" (Against All Authority)
5. "Where the Waves Are Highest" (Common Rider)
6. "Dogtown" (Common Rider)
7. "Blue Spark" (Common Rider)
8. "The Only Ones" (Common Rider)

War Machine Breakdown is a different version than that featured on The Restoration of Chaos & Order
