= Last Wave Rockers =

Studio album by Common Rider
- Released: May 25, 1999
- Recorded: February 1999
- Genre: Ska punk, reggae
- Length: 32:38
- Label: Lookout! Records; Panic Button
- Producer: Brendan Burke; Jesse Michaels

Common Rider chronology
| Last Wave Rockers (1999) | Thief in a Sleeping Town EP (2001) |

Professional ratings
Review scores
| Source | Rating |
|---|---|
| AllMusic | 3/5 stars |
| Chicago Sun-Times | 3/4 stars |
| Pitchfork | 6.0/10 |
| Sputnikmusic | 3.5/5 |

Last Wave Rockers is the debut album by the American ska punk band Common Rider, released in 1999.

== Critical reception ==
The Chicago Sun-Times wrote that "Michaels delivers a solid set of tunes that varies the tempo from full-throttle ska-punk ('Castaways') to more laid-back skanking ('Signal Signal') ... the high points are pretty rewarding, and Michaels' voice is still an original one that's well worth hearing."

== Track listing ==
All tracks are written by Jesse Michaels.

Last Wave Rockers track listing
| No. | Title | Length |
|---|---|---|
| 1. | "Classics of Love" | 2:21 |
| 2. | "Castaways" | 2:14 |
| 3. | "Signal Signal" | 2:48 |
| 4. | "Carry On" | 2:08 |
| 5. | "Rise or Fall" | 1:51 |
| 6. | "True Rulers" | 3:09 |
| 7. | "Conscious Burning" | 2:58 |
| 8. | "On Broadway" | 1:17 |
| 9. | "Heatseekers" | 2:04 |
| 10. | "A Place Where We Can Stay" | 2:46 |
| 11. | "Walk Down the River" | 2:28 |
| 12. | "Rough Redemption" | 2:30 |
| 13. | "Deep Spring" | 2:07 |
| 14. | "Angels at Play" | 1:52 |
| 15. | "Dixie Roadrash" | 2:26 |
| Total length: | | 32:38 |

== Personnel ==
- Jesse Michaels - Vocals, Guitar
- Mass Giorgini - Bass, Vocals
- Dan Lumley - Drums
- Ken Vandermark - Tenor Saxophone
- Jeff Jacobs - Hammond Organ
- Mark Ardito - Guitar (plays leads on "Classics of Love" and "Heatseekers")
