= Ceilings (album) =

Studio album by Dentist
- Released: June 24, 2016
- Genres: Surf rock, alternative rock
- Length: 32:24
- Label: Little Dickman

Dentist chronology
Dentist (2014)	Ceilings (2016)	Night Swimming (2018)

Ceilings is the second studio album from the American rock band Dentist.

== Content ==
The ten-track album was released on 12-inch vinyl and digital download with Little Dickman Records on June 24, 2016. It is described as surf rock, pop punk and dream pop, and draws comparison to the music of the Breeders, the Go-Go's, early Blondie, Madder Rose, and Babes In Toyland. In contrast to their first album, Dentist, Justin Bornemann elaborates in an interview with The Aquarian Weekly, the recording of Ceilings "was more intentional, that we're writing songs to make an album as opposed to just the songs that we had." Emily Bornemann explains the song "Awful" is about handling "not being able to choose who you love, and ultimately being stuck with them," adding "sometimes they don't notice you the way you'd like, or put the effort in that you'd like, so you're left saying 'I never wanted it to be you.'" For "Meet You There (in Delaware)," she says it is about "not being able to sit still and always looking for something to do. It seems that we always do the same thing, though, but yet there is this feeling that you need to go out most nights to a bar or see a show."

The music video for "Meet You There (in Delaware)" was released on May 25, 2016. It was recorded and directed by Jim Appio and Emily Bornemann, and edited by Jim Appio, Emily Bornemann and Justin Bornemann. It contains footage of performances on various stages, the band giving out hugs in bars, hiding in parks and riding in their van across the United States.

== Reception ==
A review for the album in The Deli describes it as "wildly fun [and] just in time for summer. Ceilings is a consistent and cohesive piece of work, with songs that blend into one another." They call the song "Joel" "one of the record's darker tracks [that] starts as a slow psych ballad before exploding into bright and upbeat." John Pfeiffer of The Aquarian Weekly says "with a combination of pop, punk, and compositional excellence as their ammunition, I don't see how [Ceilings] can miss radio with this delicious platter. He calls "Over and Over" the most radio-oriented song, noting that it "sends the band into an entirely different and delicious direction [and it] hums with urgency and musical harmonizing as well."

Stereogum's review of the song "Meet You There (in Delaware)" describe it as "intricate, intertwined bass and lead guitar [that] lets you know it's going to be a rhythmic barrage from the outset. Bornemann's lamentations about life's monotony are not to be glossed over, though it's easy to get lost in their delivery and the surround sounds." Flood Magazine says the "vocal melody floats on a coastal breeze, it's one that seems to have crossed the Atlantic to get to her; along with the cleanliness of Justin Bornemann's lead-guitar lines–and the gassed-out gasp of Emily's rhythm playing–"Meet You There" is just as reminiscent of genial British punks Male Bonding as it is the westerly surf-punk that forms the core of Dentist's sound." "Meet You There (in Delaware)" won Asbury Park Music Awards' 2016 Song of the Year award. For the song "Awful," The Spill Magazine writes that "with Emily's vocals at the focal point and a new sense of space and airiness, the song demonstrates Dentist's evolution as a band [while] maintaining all of the irresistible elements from their first album[;] this one will still be, at its core, a sun-soaked party."

== Track listing ==
No.	Title	Length
1.	"Climbed Too Many Trees"	3:53
2.	"Awful"	3:25
3.	"Meet You There (in Delaware)"	3:02
4.	"Over and Over"	3:29
5.	"Body Slam (Move)"	2:00
6.	"Joel"	2:56
7.	"You're a Bore"	2:55
8.	"You Say"	2:45
9.	"Air Vent"	5:13
10.	"Digging Up the Dog"	2:36
Total length:		32:24

== Personnel ==
- Emily Bornemann – vocals and rhythm guitar
- Justin Bornemann – lead guitar
- Nick Kaelbein – bass
- Rudy Meier – drums
