= Scum (Rat Boy album) =

Studio album by Rat Boy
- Released: 11 August 2017
- Genres: Indie pop; indie rock
- Length: 42:41
- Label: Parlophone
- Producers: James Dring; Jason Cox; Stephen Street; Rat Boy (co.)

Rat Boy chronology
Get Over It (2016)	Scum (2017)	Civil Disorder (2018)

Scum (stylized in all caps) is the debut studio album by English musician Rat Boy. It was released on 11 August 2017 via Parlophone. The album peaked at number 15 on the UK Albums Chart.

== Critical reception ==
Professional ratings
Aggregate scores
Source	Rating
AnyDecentMusic?	6.8/10
Metacritic	74/100
Review scores
Source	Rating
AllMusic	3.5/5 stars
The Arts Desk	3/5 stars
Clash	7/10
DIY	4/5 stars
The Guardian	4/5 stars
The Line of Best Fit	7/10
MusicOMH	3/5 stars
NME	3/5 stars
The Observer	3/5 stars
Q	4/5 stars

SCUM was met with generally favorable reviews from music critics. At Metacritic, which assigns a normalized rating out of 100 to reviews from mainstream publications, the album received an average score of 74 based on ten reviews. The aggregator AnyDecentMusic? has the critical consensus of the album at a 6.8 out of 10, based on thirteen reviews.

AllMusic's Neil Z. Yeung wrote: "forgiving those space fillers, Scum remains a great pleasure, the product of a young mind brimming with ideas coupled with enough youthful bravery to take such risks". Emma Swann of DIY wrote: "on this debut, Jordan and pals aren't afraid to contrast bravado with vulnerability, and it's in the unexpected that their debut shines brightes". Paul Moody of Q wrote: "the 21-year-old's eclectic debut oozes attitude, his pithy social commentary binding together sonic excursions into breezy funk-punk, poundshop hip-hop and indie tearjerkers". Hannah J Davies of The Guardian noticed: "some gimmicky Grand Theft Auto-style radio interludes aside, this is a state-of-the-nation record that's as sparkly as it is snarky". Will Rosebury of Clash wrote: "although SCUM can sometimes feel like the 2017 update of music you've enjoyed from the past 20 years, at its best Rat Boy delivers some of the most interesting and exciting moments to come from British music this year". Steven Loftin of The Line of Best Fit wrote: "if you aren't into skits and novelty voice acting then you might struggle with the twenty five-high track listing. If you are though, you're in for a treat".

In mixed reviews, Chris White of musicOMH found the album "rarely subtle and its relentless pace can become a little bit much at times. Yet there's enough promise here to suggest that with more development and quality control, Ratboy could grow into an artist of significant stature". Will Pritchard of NME described the album "more revolt than revolution. But there's undoubtedly talent here--and there’s every chance Cardy, not T, will be the touchpoint 10 years from now". Thomas H Green of The Arts Desk resumed: "it's a bouncy, youthful, over-excited Labrador of a thing". Damien Morris of The Observer wrote: "what starts off as a gang-signing, car-stealing, signing-on 21st-century Clash ends up as Jamie T robbing Jesus Jones, far more Westfield than Westway".

=== Accolades ===
Publication	Accolade	Rank	Ref.
Dork	Top 50 Albums of 2017	13	
Louder Than War	Top 100 Albums of 2017	16	

== Track listing ==
All lyrics are written by Jordan Cardy, except for track 12 written with Noah Booth.

No.	Title	Length
1.	"Turn Round M8"	2:58
2.	"Revolution"	3:28
3.	"Laidback"	3:33
4.	"Move"	2:51
5.	"Boiling Point"	2:59
6.	"Fake ID"	3:13
7.	"Sportswear"	3:14
8.	"Left 4 Dead"	2:52
9.	"Sign On"	2:51
10.	"Knock Knock Knock"	2:41
11.	"Scum"	2:38
12.	"I'll Be Waiting"	4:02
13.	"Kicked Outta School"	5:21
Total length:		42:41

== Personnel ==
- Jordan Cardy – vocals, keyboards, guitar, co-producer
- Damon Albarn – backing vocals, keyboards
- Junior Dan – bass
- Noah Booth – drums
- Graham Coxon – guitar
- Nick Hodgson – drums
- Mallory Merk – additional vocals
- Jason Cox – producer
- James Dring – producer
- Stephen Street – producer

== Charts ==
Chart performance for SCUM
Chart (2017)	Peak position
Scottish Albums (Official Charts)	21
UK Albums (Official Charts)	15
