= This Is Unity Music =

Studio album by Common Rider
- Released: September 3, 2002
- Recorded: 2002
- Genre: Ska punk, reggae
- Length: 32:38
- Label: Hopeless
- Producer: Mass Giorgini, Jesse Michaels

Common Rider chronology
Thief in a Sleeping Town EP (2001)	This Is Unity Music (2002)

Professional ratings
Review scores
Source	Rating
Punknews.org	5/5 stars

This Is Unity Music is the second full-length album by Common Rider, released in 2002.

== Track listing ==
All songs written by Jesse Michaels.

1. "Firewall" - 2:56
2. "Set the Method Down" - 2:06
3. "Small Pebble" - 3:40
4. "Cool This Madness Down" 2:32
5. "Long After Lights Out" 2:33
6. "Blackbirds vs. Crows" - 2:41
7. "Time Won't Take Away" - 3:19
8. "Prison Break" - 2:14
9. "Midnight Passenger" - 2:45
10. "One Ton" - 2:13
11. "Toss Around" - 2:14
12. "Long Shot" - 3:25

== Personnel ==
- Jesse Michaels - Vocals, Guitar
- Mass Giorgini - Bass, Saxophone
- Dan Lumley - Drums, Percussion

Featuring

- Phillip Hill - Guitar, Vocals
- Matt Demeester - Guitar, Vocals
- Audrey Marrs - Keyboards
- Additional Back Up Vocals - Matt Skiba, Dan Andriano, Brendan Kelly, Chris McCaughn, Kevin Sierzega, Joe Mizzi, Jimmy Lucido, Ray Moses and Rick Muermann
