= Exchange (EP) =

EP by Against All Authority/The Criminals
- Released: November 9, 1999
- Genres: Punk rock, ska
- Label: Sub City

Against All Authority chronology
All Fall Down (1998)	Exchange (1999)	24 Hour Roadside Resistance (2000)

Exchange is a split album by American ska punk band Against All Authority and the punk rock band the Criminals. It was first released in 1999 on Sub City Records.

== Track listing ==
Against All Authority

1. "The Bottle's Lookin' Better"
2. "WWYD?"
3. "I Want to Stab You With Something Rusty" (The Criminals Cover)
4. "Wet Foot Policy"

The Criminals

1. "All Fall Down" (AAA cover)
2. "Five Years On"
3. "Down and Out"

== Reception ==
Professional ratings
Review scores
Source	Rating
AllMusic	1.5/5 stars
Punknews.org	3.5/5 stars

The Canadian music publisher Exclaim! described the album as "An EP with a good cause".
