= Hectic =

EP by Operation Ivy
- Released: January 1988; April 18, 2012
- Recorded: November 30, 1987
- Studio: Dangerous Rhythm (Oakland, California)
- Genre: Hardcore punk, ska punk
- Length: 10:39
- Label: Lookout! Hellcat
- Producer: Kevin Army and Operation Ivy

Operation Ivy chronology
Hectic (1988)	Energy (1989)

Hectic is the debut EP by the American ska punk band Operation Ivy. It was released in January 1988 through Lookout! Records (LK 003). Hectic is credited as one of the first ska-core records.

In 1991, all six tracks from Hectic were later released on the self-titled compilation album, which also featured all the tracks from Energy and two tracks from the Turn It Around! compilation. Hectic was re-released on 12-inch vinyl by Hellcat Records on April 18, 2012.

Larry Livermore, founder of Lookout! Records, has said that Lookout! was founded solely to release an Operation Ivy record. Lookout! Records was in fact started with simply a PO Box in order to release records by Livermore's own band, the Lookouts. This was said to emphasize Operation Ivy's importance in Lookout! Records' catalog.

== Track listing ==
All lyrics are written by Jesse Michaels, except where noted; all music is composed by Operation Ivy.

Side one
No.	Title	Length
1.	"Junkie's Runnin' Dry"	2:03
2.	"Here We Go Again" (intro lyrics by Lint)	2:04
3.	"Hoboken"	1:10

Side two
No.	Title	Length
1.	"Yellin' in My Ear"	1:31
2.	"Sleep Long"	2:06
3.	"Healthy Body"	1:40
Total length:		10:39

== Personnel ==
- Jesse Michaels – lead vocals
- Lint – guitar, backing vocals, lead vocals on intro of "Here We Go Again"
- Matt MacAll – bass, backing vocals
- Dave Mello – drums, backing vocals

Additional musicians

- Pat Mello – backing vocals

Production

- Kevin Army – producer, engineer
- Operation Ivy – producers
- John Golden – mastering
- Jesse Michaels – cover art, booklet
- David Hayes (credited as “Sprocket”) – back cover, labels
- Murray Bowles; Cammie Toloui; Cesar Rubio; Vivian Sayles – photography
