= Black Cat Music =

Black Cat Music is an American punk rock band from San Francisco Bay Area, California, United States. They were formed in the summer of 1998 by former members of bands such as The Criminals and the Receivers. The music combined elements of punk & rock and roll with dark, poetic lyrics. After its formation, Black Cat Music released an EP & first full-length record on Cheetah's records. Soon thereafter, Black Cat Music signed to Lookout! Records. The band played live shows up and down the west coast, and on several national tours. In 2004, the band released a video for the song "the Jet Trash", directed by Vincent Haycock.

== Band members ==
- Brady Baltezore - vocals
- Travis Dutton - guitar - currently exploring music and it's possibilities
- Omar Perez - bass- currently playing bass in San Francisco glam goth band SO WHAT?
- Denny Martin - drums - deceased
  - previous members include Dan McComas (drums) and Jon Carling (bass)

== Discography ==
- This is the new romance EP - 1998 on Cheetah's
- The Only Thing We'll Ever Be Is All Alone LP/CD - 1999 on Cheetah's
- One Foot in the Grave EP - 1999 on Lookout!
- Hands in the Estuary, Torso in the Lake LP - 2001 on Lookout!
- October, November LP - 2004 on Lookout!
