= The Restoration of Chaos & Order =

Studio album by Against All Authority
- Released: May 9, 2006
- Genre: Ska punk
- Length: 37:37
- Label: Hopeless
- Producers: Joe Williams, Against All Authority

Against All Authority chronology
Common Rider/Against All Authority Split (2005)	The Restoration of Chaos & Order (2006)

Professional ratings
Review scores
Source	Rating
AbsolutePunk.net	70%
AllMusic	4/5 stars
NeuFutur	7.4/10
Ox-Fanzine	8/10
Punknews.org	3/5 stars
Rebel Punk	5/5 stars
Visions	5/12

The Restoration of Chaos & Order is the fifth album released by American punk rock band Against All Authority.

The album was released in 2006 and continued the band's use of punk rock and ska-influenced musical elements. It followed the band's earlier studio releases and was issued during the later period of their recording career.

The Restoration of Choas & Order contains songs addressing social and political themes, which were recurring subjects in Against All Authority's music. The album contributed to the band's recorded output during the 2000s and preceded their subsequent activity as a group.

== Track listing ==
1. "The Restoration of Chaos & Order"
2. "Sweet Televised Destruction"
3. "All Ages Show Tonight"
4. "Collecting Scars"
5. "Radio Waves"
6. "Silence Is Golden but Duct Tape Is Silver"
7. "Shut It Down"
8. "Sunshine Fist Magnet"
9. "I Just Wanna Start a Circle Pit"
10. "War Machine Breakdown"
11. "Grinding My Life Away"
12. "The Production of Self Destruction"
13. "Buried Alive"
14. "Best Enemy"
15. "Holiday in Cambodia" (Vinyl exclusive)

== Personnel ==
- Danny Lore - Vocals/Bass
- Joe Koontz - Guitar/Vocals
