= Expansive Heart =

EP by Big Rig
- Released: July 12, 1994
- Recorded: 1993
- Studio: Art of Ears Studios, San Francisco, California
- Genre: Punk rock
- Length: 9:02
- Label: Lookout! Records
- Producer: Andy Ernst and Big Rig

Expansive Heart is the debut EP and only release by California punk band Big Rig. It was released July 12, 1994 on Lookout! Records. In 2020, Oakland, California record label 1-2-3-4 Go! Records announced they would be re-releasing 1000 copies of the EP on vinyl.

== Track listing ==
No.	Title	Length
1.	"Expansive Heart"	2:14
2.	"Will Alone"	2:02
3.	"New Fist"	2:20
4.	"Persistence"	2:26
Total length:		9:02

== Personnel ==
Credits adapted from EP liner notes and Discogs.

Big Rig

- Jesse Michaels – lead vocals
- Doug Sangalang – guitar, vocals (4)
- Kevin Cross – guitar, vocals (4)
- Jeremy Goody – bass, vocals (4)
- Brandon Riggen – drums, vocals (4)

Production

- Andy Ernst – engineering, production
- Big Rig – production
