= Downfall (band) =

American ska punk band (1989)

- Origin: Berkeley, California
- Genres: Ska punk, hardcore punk
- Years active: 1989
- Label: Lookout
- Spinoffs: Rancid
- Spinoff of: Operation Ivy
- Past members: Tim Armstrong; Matt Freeman; Dave Mello; Pat Mello; Jason Hammon

Downfall was a ska and punk band from the Bay Area formed by Tim Armstrong, Matt Freeman, Dave Mello, Pat Mello, and Jason Hammon following the break-up of Operation Ivy in 1989 and pre-dating Armstrong's and Freeman's wider recognition in Rancid. They performed three shows, one at 924 Gilman Street, over a period of three months.

== Line-up ==
- Tim Armstrong – vocals
- Matt Freeman – bass
- Dave Mello – drums
- Pat Mello – guitar
- Jason Hammon – guitar

== Recordings ==
In 1989 Downfall recorded what was going to be a 10" on Very Small Records, but after a dispute over the amount of songs that should be included, the release was scrapped. In 1994 a number of those songs were going to be compiled for a release on Lookout! Records and titled "Get Ready For Action." The album would have been Lookout!#99, and was scheduled for release in late 1994. Get Ready For Action was delayed and never released. Brett Gurewitz remixed the album, but due to Rancid's mainstream attention, it was also never released.

== Compilation Appearances ==
Year	Title	Label	Contributing track
1989	They Don't Get Paid, They Don't Get Laid, But Boy Do They Work Hard! LP	Maximum RocknRoll	"Long Way to Go"
1992	Can of Pork 2xLP/CD	Lookout!	"North Berkeley"
1992	Very Small World 2xLP	Very Small	"New Regulations"
1992	Later That Same Year Cassette/CD"	Absolutely Zippo	"My City"
