= Night Swimming (EP) =

EP by Young Lyre
- Released: 9 November 2012
- Recorded: 2011
- Genre: Indie pop; synth pop
- Length: 18:39
- Language: English

Young Lyre chronology
Night Swimming (2012)	Weekend (2015)

Night Swimming is the first EP released by New Zealand band, Young Lyre, released on 9 November 2012. The EP reached number fifteen on the Official New Zealand Music Chart one week after its release.

== Background ==
The band started creating music in the college competing on Rockquest in New Zealand. After changing the band name from "Sons of Darragh" to "Oresund" to "The Frisk", they decided to settle on the name of "Young Lyre" in 2011. Featuring songs of their first years, the EP Night Swimming was officially released on 9 November 2012. One week after its release, the EP was the number fifteen on the Official New Zealand Music Chart.

== Singles ==
The first single and music video from the EP was "Make Light", released on 15 March 2012 and directed by Jordan Dodson.

== Track listing ==
No.	Title	Length
1.	"Little Love"	2:26
2.	"Night Swimming"	3:46
3.	"Both Burn Blue"	4:24
4.	"Interlude"	3:47
5.	"Make Light"	4:16
Total length:		18:39

== Personnel ==
=== Young Lyre ===
- Jordan Curtis – lead vocals, synths (2008–present)
- Sanjay Bangs – guitar, backing vocals (2008–present)
- Kiran Rai – guitar, synths (2008–present)
- Simon Roots – drums (2008–present)
- Matt Judd – bass, backing vocals (2008–present)
