= Night Swimming (album) =

Studio album by Dentist
- Released: July 20, 2018
- Studio: Simple Sound Studios, Oceanport, New Jersey
- Genre: Surf rock, alternative rock
- Length: 34:23
- Label: Cleopatra
- Producer: Andy Bova, Justin Bornemann

Dentist chronology
Ceilings (2016)	Night Swimming (2018)

Night Swimming is the third studio album from the American rock band Dentist.

== Content ==
The eleven-track album was released on 12-inch vinyl, compact disc and digital download with Cleopatra Records, on July 20, 2018. It was recorded at Simple Sounds Studios in Oceanport, New Jersey, produced by Andy Bova and Justin Bornemann, mixed by Andy Bova and mastered by Jürgen Engler. Lyrically, Night Swimming focuses on social anxiety, heartache and loss, and love and optimism. On the record's songwriting, Emily Bornemann says they were "attracted to rawness and simplicity, but melodically we lean[ed] towards a pop aesthetic," and J. Bornemann notes the album was "an attempt to capture all the different aspects of ourselves and create something that we would want to listen to." E. Bornemann says the title-track 'is one of the best examples of expressing [my] true feelings." The album draws comparison to the music of Fazerdaze, The Primitives, The Cardigans, and Soft Science.

The music video for the song "The Latter" was written, directed and edited by Dana Yurcisin, with additional production by Biff Swenson, cinematography by Greg Papalcure and art and light direction by Chris York. It was filmed in Allentown, Pennsylvania, East Stroudsburg, Pennsylvania, Centralia, Pennsylvania and Beachwood, New Jersey. Yurcisin explains that the music video is about "blaming oneself for romantic failures. Instead of taking the often tread route of showing a relationship in decay, we thought it'd be interesting to play with the idea of an actual second self, a doppelgänger containing all of her flaws, self-destructive tendencies, [and] she's her own living nightmare."

== Reception ==
A review by Alex McLevy in The A.V. Club says "throughout the record the group takes its surf-rock stylings in unexpected directions, whether it's the hard-charging riffs of the title track, or the slow-build indie-groove churn of "Owl Doom Pt. 2."" Bob Makin in Institute for Nonprofit News notes that Night Swimming "shed[s] an occasional sense of silliness for a lyrically stark and sonically focused collection that laughs at life's absurdities and cries at its hardships with stinging, ringing riffs, solid slabs of rhythm and mournful, hopeful poetics," adding that the "signature fuzz tones and a poppy undertow remain intact among a cryptically detailed loss of innocence that makes [it their] best record to date." It is described as "highly accessible[,] fresh, enjoyable and full of energy" by the FM radio station WRAT.

The Big Takeover writes the song "Upset Words is a "potent sonic sea spray [of] riding choppy guitar waves and propulsive drum rhythm. A deeper undercurrent of bass churns around Emily Bornemann's sweetly buoyant vocals that are tinged with sandy grit." Impose says the song "The Latter" is a "perfect slice of everything that makes Dentist's surf-pop sound so enticing as Emily's vocals ride over Justin's furious fret work and Nicks['s] driving, locked in rhythms." It won the 2018 Asbury Park Music Awards' Song of the Year award.

== Track listing ==
No.	Title	Length
1.	"Upset Words"	3:09
2.	"Night Swimming"	3:04
3.	"Alone in the Garden"	2:06
4.	"OH"	2:43
5.	"Tight Spot"	2:11
6.	"Remind Me"	2:18
7.	"Figure-four"	3:22
8.	"All Is Well (in Hell)"	3:37
9.	"Corked"	3:15
10.	"Owl Doom Pt. 2"	3:09
11.	"The Latter"	2:54
Total length:		34:23

== Personnel ==
- Emily Bornemann – vocals and bass
- Justin Bornemann – guitar
- Matt Hockenjos – drums
- Nick Kaelblein – bass on "The Latter"
