= Dental care =

Dental care or dentalcare is the maintenance of healthy teeth and may refer to:

- Oral hygiene, the practice of keeping the mouth and teeth clean in order to prevent dental disorders
- Dentistry, the professional care of teeth, including professional oral hygiene and dental surgery
- Oral surgery, any of a number of medical procedures that involve artificially modifying dentition; in other words, surgery of the teeth and jaw bones
- "Dental Care", a 2009 song by Owl City on the album Ocean Eyes
