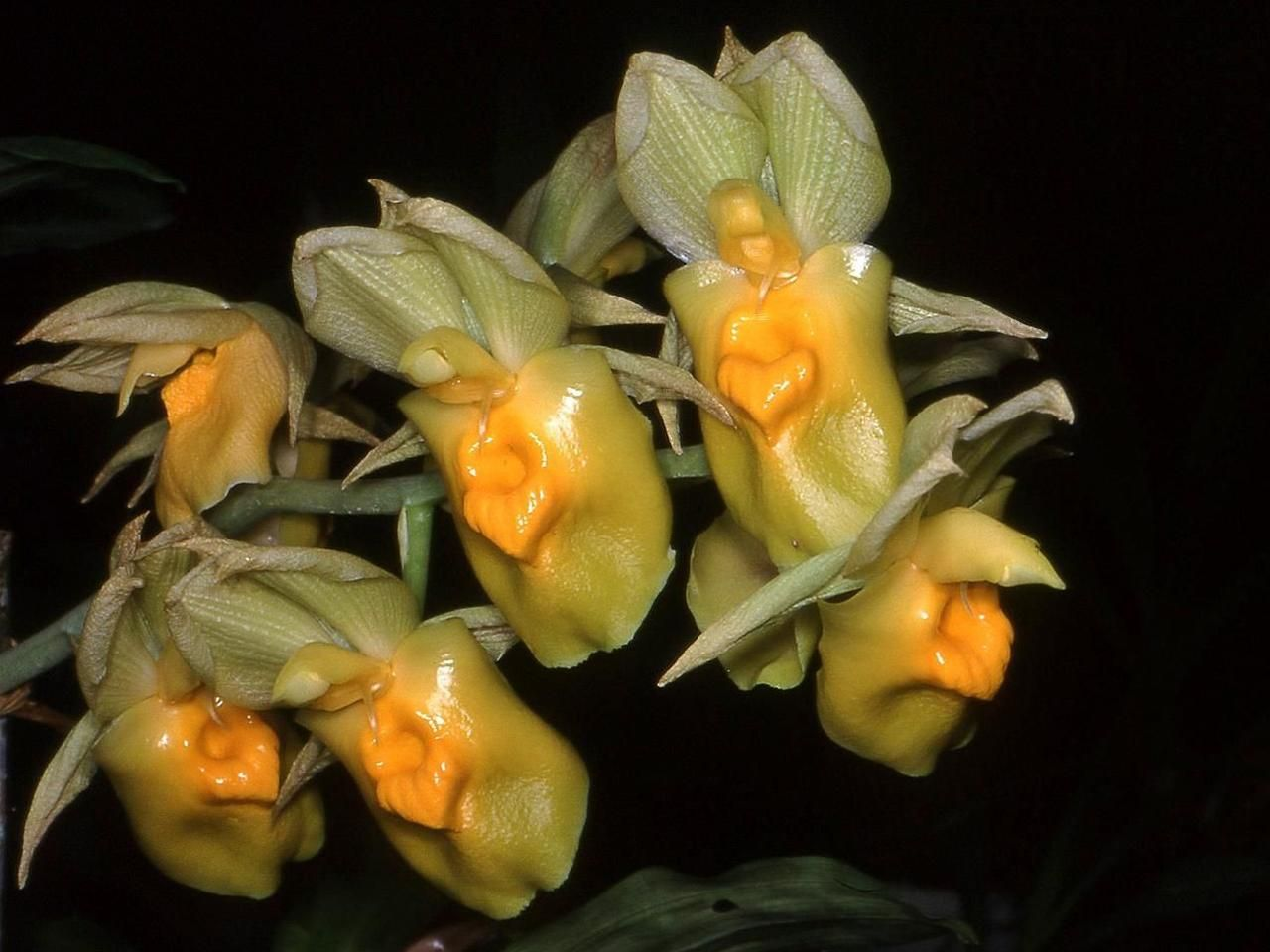

Scientific classification
- Kingdom: Plantae
- Clade: Tracheophytes
- Clade: Angiosperms
- Clade: Monocots
- Order: Asparagales
- Family: Orchidaceae
- Subfamily: Epidendroideae
- Genus: Catasetum
- Species: C. expansum

Binomial name
- Catasetum expansum Rchb.f. (1878)

Synonyms
- Catasetum cliftonii auct. (1911); Catasetum platyglossum Schltr. (1916)

= Catasetum expansum =

Species of orchid found in Ecuador

Catasetum Expansum, the Expansive Catasetum, is a species of epiphytic orchid endemic to Ecuador. The species typically grows in dry forests found in West Ecuador. The Expansive Catasetum blooms during May to December on a basal, 30 cm long, 6 flowered arching raceme arising on a new pseudobulb carrying male or female flowers. The flowers have a diverse range of colors including yellow, green, white, and sometimes with spots that are maroon.

To keep the species healthy it needs around 45000 Lux and 50% shade.

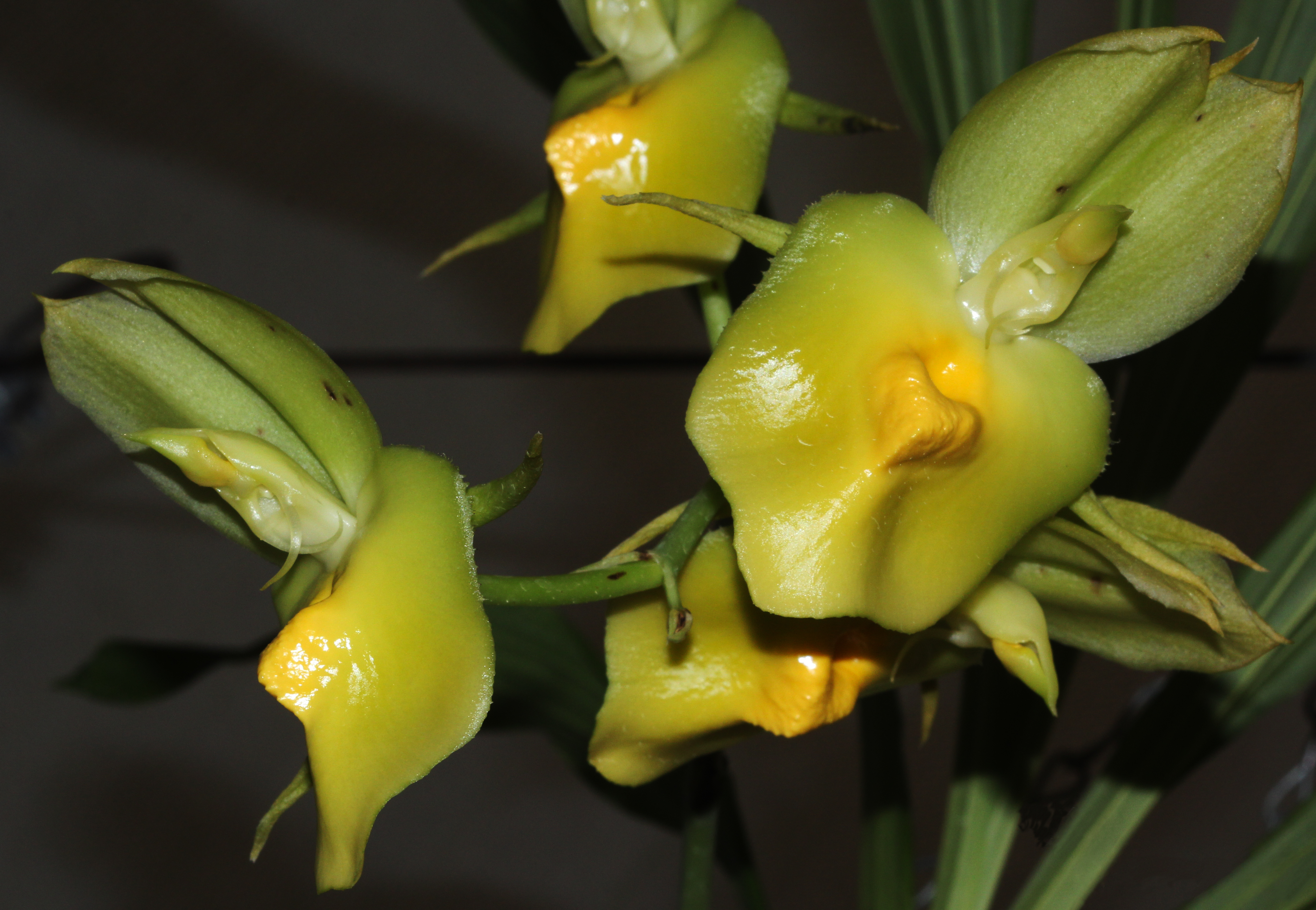

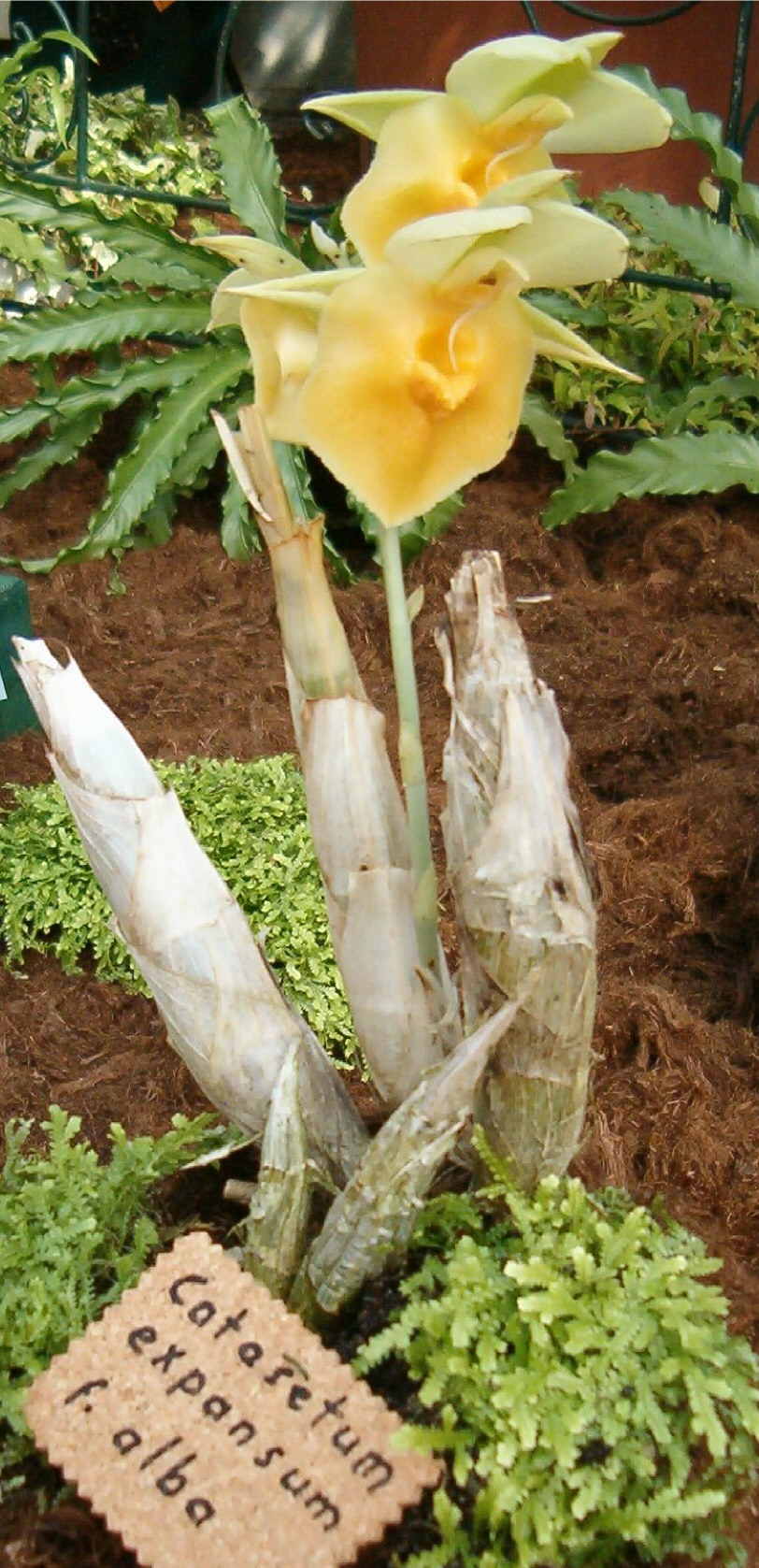

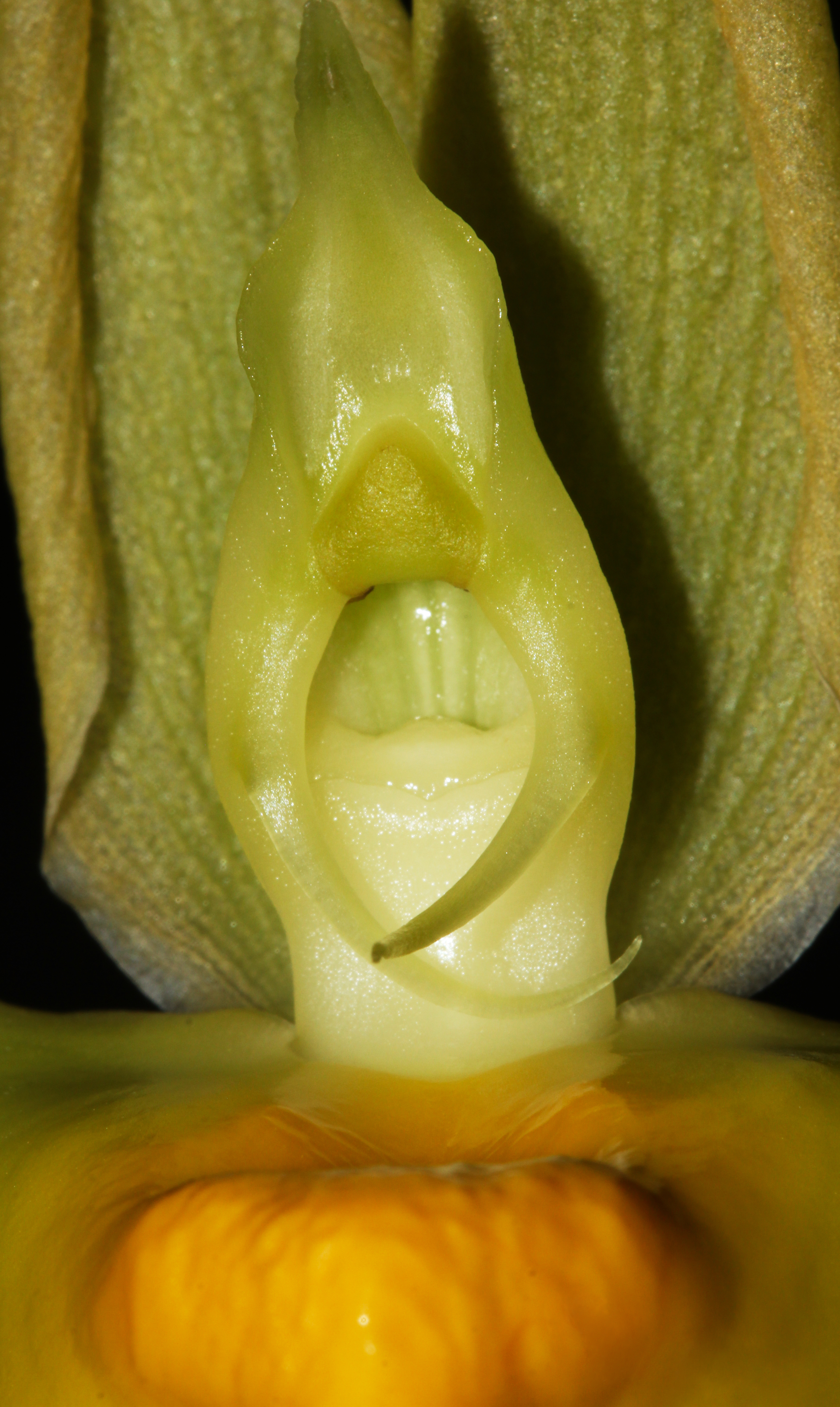
