= Dentist (band) =

American rock band

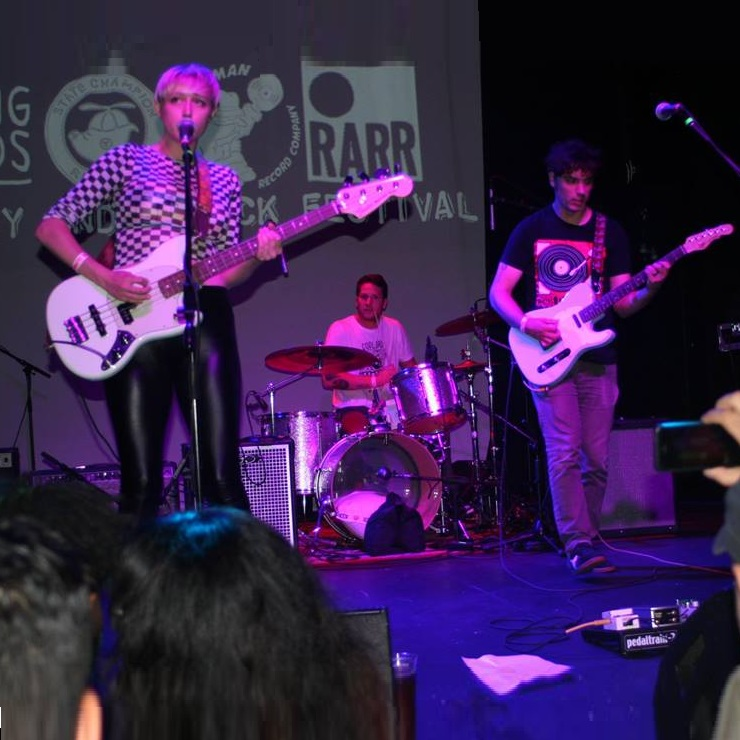
- Dentist in 2018

Background information
- Origin: Asbury Park, New Jersey, U.S.
- Genres: Surf rock, pop punk, alternative rock
- Years active: 2013–current
- Labels: Little Dickman, Cleopatra
- Members: Emily Bornemann; Justin Bornemann; Matt Hockenjos
- Website: www.dentistband.com

Dentist is an American rock band from New Jersey.

== History ==
Dentist is an alternative surf rock trio from Asbury Park, New Jersey, that formed in 2013. The band is composed of vocalist and bassist Emily Bornemann, guitarist Justin Bornemann, and drummer Matt Hockenjos. E. Bornemann and J. Bornemann previously played together in the Asbury Park indie rock group, No Wine for Kittens. Their music is described as the "combine[d] freedom of the beach atmosphere and the urgency of the city into a fuzzed out, surf punk-tinged brand of indie pop with hooks and infectious melodies," they draw comparison to the music of Best Coast, Wavves and the Drums.

Their first single "No Matter" was released on December 4, 2013, and the second single "I Do it Cause I Wanna" on February 26, 2014. Both appear on their debut thirteen-track album, Dentist, released with Good Eye Records on May 14, 2014. The record is a collection of songs Dentist played live during their first year as a group. Pandora Radio compares Dentist to the music of the Ramones and Mazzy Star, and call it "California styled, indie-pop jangle and sun-dappled, garage-rock crunch." They received the 2014 Asbury Park Music Awards' Top Indie/Alt Rock Band award. Dentist's second album was the ten-track Ceilings, which was released on 12-inch vinyl and digital download with Little Dickman Records, on June 24, 2016. It is described as surf rock, pop punk and dream pop, and a review by The Deli describes it as "a consistent and cohesive piece of work, with songs that blend into one another."

They performed at the North Jersey Indie Rock Festival on September 23, 2017, and at the 2018 South by Southwest festival. SXSW listed Dentist in their Top 10 bands, and call their music a "breezy joy of a summer at the beach." Cleopatra Records released the eleven-track album Night Swimming on 12-inch vinyl, compact disc and digital download on 20 July 2018. Institute for Nonprofit News note that Dentist's "signature fuzz tones and a poppy undertow remain intact among a cryptically detailed loss of innocence that makes [it their] best record to date." Dentist performed at the North Jersey Indie Rock Festival on October 6, 2018.

The band’s fourth studio album, Making A Scene, was released on September 2, 2022. The band made an appearance at that month’s Sea.Hear.Now festival in Asbury Park, alongside acts such as Stevie Nicks and Green Day.

== Members ==
- Emily Bornemann – vocals and bass
- Justin Bornemann – guitar
- Matt Hockenjos – drums

Past members

- Andy Bova – drums
- Nick Kaelblein – bass
- Matt Maneri – keys
- Rudy Meier - drums

== Discography ==
Albums

- Dentist (2014)
- Ceilings (2016)
- Night Swimming (2018)
- Making A Scene (2022)

Singles

- "No Matter" (2013)
- "I Do It Cause I Wanna" (2014)
