= Dentist (album) =

Studio album by Dentist
- Released: May 14, 2014
- Genre: Surf rock, pop rock
- Length: 36:18
- Label: Good Eye

Dentist chronology
| Dentist (2014) | Ceilings (2016) |

Dentist is the debut studio album from the American rock band Dentist.

== Content ==
The thirteen-track album was released by Good Eye Records, the label's first release, on May 14, 2014. In a 2016 interview with The Aquarian Weekly, Emily Bornemann recalls "it was more for fun than anything else. It was just songs that Justin and I had been writing for a year or so [and we] decided to record them and put an album together[,] so it's a little goof[y]." Justin Bornemann adds "they were the songs we were playing live. We never thought about it that much until we went to record them." Dentist draws comparison to the music of Alvvays, the Drums, and Wavves.

The album's first single, "No Matter," was released on December 4, 2013, and the second single "I Do it Cause I Wanna" on February 26, 2014. The record release party for Dentist was held at The Saint in Asbury Park, New Jersey, on May 9, 2014 with Seaside Caves, Paper Streets, dollys, and XNY.

== Reception ==
Pandora Radio calls Dentist a "deliriously infectious collection of fuzzy, California styled, indie-pop jangle and sun-dappled, garage-rock crunch. At times it sounds like Best Coast crossed with the Ramones – other times, like a revved up Mazzy Star. Low fidelity, high quality." A review by The Aquarian Weekly describes the album as "beach-breaking Fujiwaras that roll from choppy, pop punk kick-outs to hot-dogging groundswells of millennialism angst. Sparsely produced, the record focuses on wringing every drop of addictive melody into these musical pieces." It closes with saying Dentist "investigate a lush and extensively more elaborate direction than [with prior projects], and it's a course that should get this band riding quite high on the perfect wave of success."

Speak Into My Good Eye's review of the single "No Matter" says it has "whip smart pop sensibilities with that garage charm set against a steady, rolling bass line. Whitt (E. Bornemann) warns a wandering lover with a lyrical snarl juxtaposed against her high register. It's a classic tell off to a deadbeat who is so inattentive that they fail to realize their partner can shred." Jersey Beat editor Paul Silver describes the opener "Pretty Lady" as "a cool surf-punk track, with bits of 50s doo-wop sounds," and adds "at times, they get a little heavier, like on "Bird in the Cage," which sounds sort of like 90s grunge, but a little lighter. Nirvana is brought to mind." The song "Bird in a Cage" is the winner of the Asbury Park Music Awards' Top Song category.

== Track listing ==
| No. | Title | Length |
|---|---|---|
| 1. | "Pretty Lady" | 1:42 |
| 2. | "Fruit and Cake" | 2:28 |
| 3. | "I Do it Cause I Wanna" | 2:48 |
| 4. | "Dolce" | 3:35 |
| 5. | "Retired Lifeguard" | 2:23 |
| 6. | "No Matter" | 2:17 |
| 7. | "Bird in a Cage" | 2:46 |
| 8. | "Bad Breath" | 2:15 |
| 9. | "Koko B. Ware" | 2:53 |
| 10. | "Batman" | 2:10 |
| 11. | "Robot" | 2:21 |
| 12. | "Four Dolli Stoli" | 3:37 |
| 13. | "Dinosaur" | 4:01 |
| Total length: | | 36:18 |

== Personnel ==
- Emily Bornemann – vocals and rhythm guitar
- Justin Bornemann – lead guitar
- Andy Bova – drums
- Nick Kaelblein – bass
- Matt Maneri – keys
