= Fin Leavell =

American singer-songwriter

Ciaran Ambrose Leofin Snow
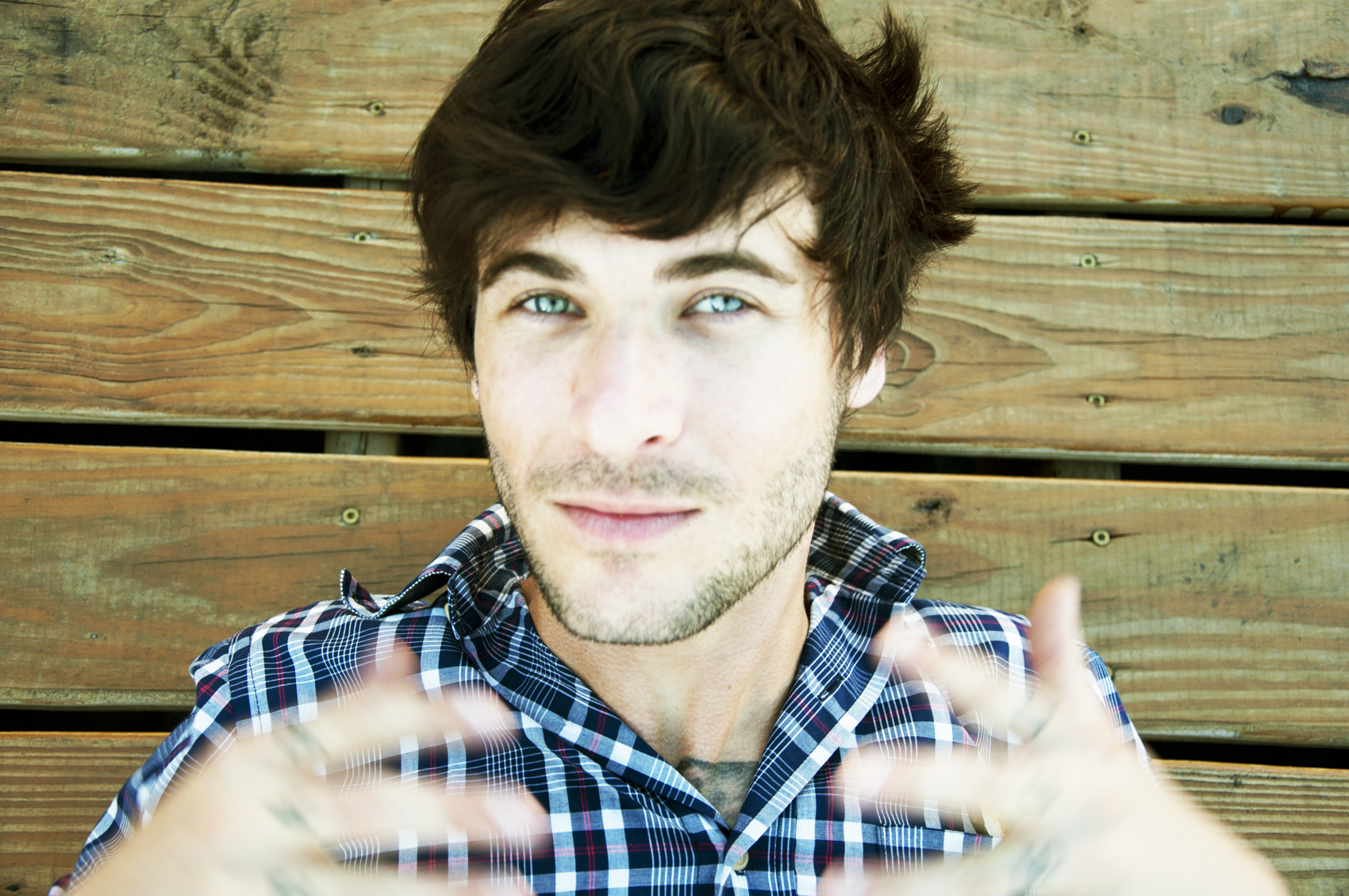
- Leofin in Brooklyn, NY

Background information
- Also known as: Nightswim; Galaxy Flowers; Fin; Allan; Skallan; LP
- Genres: Chiptune; anarcho-punk; electropunk; space punk; pop punk; hardcore punk; ska; ska punk; shoegaze; drum and bass; synth-pop; electropop; ambient
- Occupations: Singer, songwriter, composer, instrumentalist
- Instruments: synthesizers; bass trombone; guitar; baritone saxophone; bass; organ; rhodes; Game Boy; piano; drums; percussion; NES; drum machines
- Labels: Virgin Records; Columbia Records; Universal Records; EMI Music Japan; Hopeless Records; Sega; Life on Planes; Sub City Records; Galaxy Wide Records; Bullion Records; Tiny Meow; Capcom; MySpace Records; Save the Planet Records
- Website: nightswim.com

Ciarán Ambrose Leofin Snow, known professionally as Fin Leavell (/ˈlʌvɛl/ LUV-el), is a multi-instrumentalist composer, sound designer, mixing engineer, record producer, and hobbyist video game producer known by the names Nightswim, & Galaxy Flowers.

Fin is the trombonist of political hardcore punk/skapunk band Against All Authority. He studied music theory for classical music, jazz, and electronic music at Douglas Anderson School of the Arts, and studied astrobiology in Jacksonville, FL with the late Dr. Michael D. Reynolds.

== Discography ==
=== As Ciarán Snow ===
| Title | Album details |
|---|---|
| Ghost This | EP; Released: December 11, 2020 (INTL); Label: Synthesizer Sharks; Formats: Digital download |

=== As Synthfucker ===
| Title | Album details |
|---|---|
| Nature Wins | Single; Released: November 27, 2020 (INTL); Label: Synthesizer Hearts; Formats: Digital download |

=== As Galaxy Flowers ===
| Title | Album details |
|---|---|
| Audio Game | EP; Released: September 21, 2014 (INTL); Label: Galaxy Wide Records; Formats: Digital download |
| Game Worship | LP; Released: October 5, 2018 (INTL); Label: Galaxy Wide Records; Formats: Vinyl, CD, digital download |

=== As Nightswim ===
| Title | Album Details |
|---|---|
| Color Stardust | EP; Released: February 14, 2012 (INTL); Label: An Island Lost At Sea Music; Formats: CD, digital download |
| Space Cadet Me | EP; Released: April 20, 2015 (INTL); Label: Galaxy Wide Records; Formats: Digital download |
| Color Exist | LP; Released: March 27, 2020 (INTL); Label: Galaxy Wide Records; Formats: Digital download |

| Single Title | Details |
|---|---|
| Waiting Room of Your Mind | Released: November 11, 2011 (INTL); Label: An Island Lost At Sea Music; Formats: Music video, digital download |
| Circle the Sun | Released: April 23, 2013 (INTL); Label: Galaxy Wide Records; Formats: Digital download |
| I'm Not on the Moon | Released: September 3, 2013 (INTL); Label: Galaxy Wide Records; Formats: Digital download |
| The Lost Astronaut | Released: February 2, 2014 (INTL); Label: Galaxy Wide Records; Formats: Digital download |
| Fire and Snow | Released: July 11, 2014 (INTL); Label: Galaxy Wide Records; Formats: Digital download |
| Just One Taste | Released: March 14, 2015 (INTL); Label: Galaxy Wide Records; Formats: Digital download |
| Last Few Seconds of July | Released: September 15, 2015 (INTL); Label: Galaxy Wide Records; Formats: Digital download |
| She Was Blue | Released: December 11, 2016 (INTL); Label: Galaxy Wide Records; Formats: Digital download |
| Slickest Muthafucka | Released: October 12, 2018 (INTL); Label: Galaxy Wide Records; Formats: Digital download |

| Compilation Title | Details |
|---|---|
| Police State: A Tribute To The Police | T02: Message in a Bottle; Released: March 13, 2012 (INTL); Label: Movement Frequencies; Formats: Digital download |
| World 1–2: Encore | T02: A Crook Man's Eyes (Megaman 5); Released: September 17, 2013 (INTL); Label: Brave Wave Music / Koopa Soundworks; Formats: Digital download |
| World 1–2: The Complete Collection | CD3, T02: A Crook Man's Eyes (Megaman 5); Released: September 17, 2013 (INTL); Label: Brave Wave Music / Koopa Soundworks; Formats: Triple-CD, digital download |
| Megaman X Childsplay Charity 2013 | Repliforce Mutiny (Megaman X4); Released: October 29, 2013 (INTL); Label: Capcom / Storm Unity / Galaxy Wide Records; Formats: Digital download |

=== With Against All Authority ===
| Title | Album details |
|---|---|
| Nothing New for Trash Like You | LP; Released: October 6, 2001 (INTL); Label: Hopeless Records / Subcity Records; Formats: CD, digital download |

=== With The Summer Obsession ===
| Title | Album details |
|---|---|
| Two Types of People | LP; Released: June 29, 2004 (INTL); Label: Galaxy Wide Records; Formats: Digital download |
| The Seawalk Hotel | EP; Released: November 16, 2004 (INTL); Label: Galaxy Wide Records; Formats: Digital download |
| Magic Mountain Sessions | EP; Released: April 20, 2005 (INTL); Label: Galaxy Wide Records; Formats: Digital download |
| TSO | EP; Released: April 20, 2006 (INTL); Label: Galaxy Wide Records; Formats: CD, digital download |
| Do You Remember | Single; Released: June 20, 2006 (INTL); Label: EMI/Virgin Records; Formats: CD, digital download |
| This Is Where You Belong | LP; Released: August 29, 2006 (NA); Label: EMI/Virgin Records; Formats: CD, digital download; Released: December 7, 2006 (JPN); Label: EMI Music Japan; Formats: CD, digital download |
| We're Not Virgins Anymore | EP; Released: January 30, 2007 (INTL); Label: Galaxy Wide Records; Formats: CD, Digital download |
| Between the Sets | EP; Released: January 30, 2007 (INTL); Label: Galaxy Wide Records; Formats: Digital download |
| The Salvia Sessions | EP; Released: October 30, 2007 (INTL); Label: Galaxy Wide Records; Formats: Digital download |
| Allegiance To the Fire | EP; Released: May 30, 2008 (INTL); Label: Galaxy Wide Records; Formats: Digital download |
| Believe Nothing Explore Everything | LP; Released: September 2, 2010 (JPN); Label: Bullion Records / Sega Sammy; Formats: CD, digital download; Released: October 26, 2010 (INTL); Label: Galaxy Wide Records; Formats: Digital download |
| The Summer Obsession | LP; Released: January 19, 2011 (JPN); Label: Bullion Records / Sega Sammy; Formats: CD, digital download |

=== With Greyfield ===
| Title | Album details |
|---|---|
| Party After The Show | EP; Released: December 4, 2001 (INTL); Label: Hot Like Fire Records; Formats: CD, Digital download |
| Live from Myrtle Beach! | LP; Released: March 3, 2002 (INTL); Label: Pop Pop Records; Formats: CD, Digital download |
| Soundtrack to the Summer | EP; Released: February 2, 2003 (NA); Released: July 16, 2002 (JPN); Label: Search and Rescue Records; Formats: CD, digital download |
| The Tito Sessions | EP; Released: March 3, 2003 (INTL); Label: Search and Rescue Records; Formats: CD, digital download |

=== With Start Trouble ===
| Title | Album details |
|---|---|
| Every Solution Has Its Problem | LP; Released: March 23, 2004 (INTL); Label: Sony/Columbia Records; Formats: CD, digital download |
| Chemical | Single; Released: January 1, 2003 (INTL); Label: Sony/Columbia Records; Formats: CD, digital download |

=== With Clean Machine ===
| Title | Album details |
|---|---|
| Tennessee Beach | LP; Released: Fall, 2017; Label: Intelligent Pop Records; Formats: Vinyl, CD, digital download |

=== With Bed Destroyers ===
| Title | Album details |
|---|---|
| Sell Your Soul To Yourself | LP; Released: November 18, 2003 (INTL); Label: BedDes Records; Formats: CD, digital download |
| Mr. Santa | Single; Released: December 25, 2003 (INTL); Label: BedDes Records; Formats: Digital download |
| Free Will Is An Illusion | EP; Released: April 20, 2004 (INTL); Label: BedDes Records; Formats: Digital download |
| Vampire | Single; Released: June 16, 2010 (INTL); Label: BedDes Records; Formats: Digital download |

=== With The Students ===
| Title | Album details |
|---|---|
| Bogie Comes To Riverside | EP; Released: September 21, 2008 (INTL); Label: An Island Lost At Sea Music; Formats: Digital download |

=== With Separation Is Natural ===
| Title | Album details |
|---|---|
| Vibrations Yearning To Be a Bigger Wave | EP; Released: September 21, 2007 (INTL); Label: An Island Lost At Sea Music; Formats: Digital download |

=== With Last Chance ===
| Title | Album details |
|---|---|
| Just the Beginning EP | EP; Released: May 20, 2000 (INTL); Label: Good To Go Records, MP3.com, Evil Gnome Records; Formats: CD, digital download |
| Outlook | LP; Released: January 15, 2001 (INTL); Label: MP3.com; Formats: CD, digital download |
| Away EP | EP; Released: April 20, 2001 (INTL); Label: MP3.com; Formats: CD, digital download |
