= Nothing New for Trash Like You =

Studio album by Against All Authority
- Released: October 6, 2001
- Recorded: 2001
- Genres: Punk rock, ska punk
- Length: 37:00
- Label: Sub City

Against All Authority chronology
24 Hour Roadside Resistance (2000)	Nothing New for Trash Like You (2001)	Against All Authority / Common Rider (2005)

Nothing New for Trash Like You is an album from American ska-punk band Against All Authority. The album was first released in 2001 on Sub City Records.

Songs 12-17 were previously included on Destroy What Destroys You, and other tracks were lifted off of various split albums.

== Track listing ==
1. "Just an Obstruction" – 1:32
2. "That Way" – 2:19
3. "In on Your Joke" – 1:41
  - Seattle hardcore band Christ On A Crutch cover.
4. "Bakunin" – 2:18
  - About nineteenth-century Russian anarchist Mikhail Bakunin.
5. "Livin' in Miami" – 1:52
6. "When It Comes Down to You" – 1:38
7. "Nothing to Lose" – 2:08
8. "Haymarket Square" – 2:13
  - Deals with the 1886 U.S. Haymarket Riot.
9. "Sacco & Vanzetti" – 1:36
  - Deals with the Sacco and Vanzetti case, in which two Italian anarchists were executed for murder in 1927.
10. "Alba" – 1:55
  - About the Cuban mother of a bandmember.
11. "Threat" – 1:49
  - The Pist cover
12. "Hard as Fuck" – 2:06
13. "Centerfold" – 1:52
  - J. Geils Band cover.
14. "Above the Law" – 2:49
15. "We Won't Submit" – 2:12
16. "Court 22" – 2:10
17. "Under Your Authority" – 2:39
18. "Ska Sucks" – 1:34
  - Propagandhi cover.

== Personnel ==
- Danny Lore - Vocals/Bass
- Joe Koontz - Guitar/Vocals
- Fin Leavell - Bass Trombone
- Spikey Goldbach - Drums
