= Big Rig (band) =

- Big Rig in 1993

Background information
- Origin: East Bay, California, United States
- Genres: Punk rock, alternative rock
- Years active: 1993
- Label: Lookout Records 1-2-3-4 Go! Records

Big Rig was a short-lived punk band formed in the east San Francisco Bay Area in 1993. The group was fronted by singer/songwriter Jesse Michaels after his previous band, Operation Ivy, broke up in 1989. Big Rig played only one show during their brief existence as a band. Their sole, the EP Expansive Heart, was released in 1994 by Lookout Records and later reissued in 2020 by 1-2-3-4 Go! Records. Big Rig broke up in 1993, only a few months after they formed.

== Members ==
- Jesse Michaels – vocals (1993)
- Doug Sangalang – guitar (1993)
- Kevin Cross – guitar (1993)
- Jeremy Goody – bass (1993)
- Brandon Riggen – drums (1993)

== Discography ==
=== Extended plays ===
| Title | Details |
|---|---|
| Expansive Heart | Released: 12 July 1994; Label: Lookout Records, 1-2-3-4 Go! Records; Formats: 7" vinyl, CD |
