= Destroy What Destroys You =

Studio album by Against All Authority
- Released: July 7, 1996
- Recorded: May 1995
- Genre: Ska punk
- Length: 44:29
- Label: Far Out Records
- Producers: Jeremy Dubois & Against all Authority

Against All Authority chronology
Less Than Jake/Against All Authority (1995)	Destroy What Destroys You (1996)	Reject (1996)

Professional ratings
Review scores
Source	Rating
AllMusic	3/5 stars
Maximum Rocknroll	Unfavourable
Ox-Fanzine	

Destroy What Destroys You is the debut album by the American ska-punk band Against All Authority. It was recorded by the band in May 1995 without any affiliation to a label or studio. It was released in 1996 by Far Out Records. The original album contained 18 songs. it was expanded for the CD and cassette release to include four songs from the band's first 7" release, "Above the Law".

== Track listing ==
1. "Lifestyle of Rebellion" – 1:51
2. "No Reason" – 2:19
3. "Conditioning" – 2:09
4. "Freedom" – 1:57
5. "Destroy What Destroys You" – 1:47
6. "It Really Sucks When..." – 1:33
7. "Bloodclot" – 1:35
8. "Another Fuck You Song" – 2:08
9. "No Government Can Give You Freedom" – 0:35 (mistitled as 30 Sec Song)
10. "Kickin' the Dog" – 1:36
11. "Sounds of the Underground" – 1:45
12. "Osuchowski's on the Loose" – 2:06
13. "Walking Revolution" – 2:33
14. "Disobey" – 1:36
15. "Chelsea Baby" – 1:53
16. "Corporate Takeover" – 1:58
17. "Hard as Fuck" – 2:13
18. "Centerfold" – 1:54
19. "We Won't Submit" – 2:27 (CD & cassette only)
20. "Above the Law" – 2:51 (CD & cassette only)
21. "Under Your Authority" – 2:42 (CD & cassette only)
22. "Court 22" – 2:17 (CD & cassette only)

== Personnel ==
- Danny Lore (bass guitar, lead vocals)
- Joe Koontz (guitar, backing vocals)
- Kris King (drums)
- Tim Farout (trombone)
- Joey Jukes (trumpet)
- Tim Coats (saxophone)

== Crew ==
- Omar Angulo (artwork)
- Greg Lee (mastering)
