= 24 Hour Roadside Resistance =

Studio album by Against All Authority
- Released: March 21, 2000
- Studios: The Dungeon, Miami, Florida
- Genre: Ska punk
- Length: 34:10
- Label: Hopeless
- Producer: Jeremy Dubois

Against All Authority chronology
Exchange (1999)	24 Hour Roadside Resistance (2000)	Nothing New for Trash Like You (2001)

Professional ratings
Review scores
Source	Rating
Visions	9/12

24 Hour Roadside Resistance is the third studio album by American political ska punk band Against All Authority; first released in 2000.

The album contains a two-and-a-half minute spoken word track (the second half of 'The Source of Strontium 90') from a member of the Radiation and Public Health Project about the risks of radioactive fallout from nuclear power plants for children in South Florida.

== Reception ==
The album received several positive reviews, the notion being that Against All Authority had hit their stride as their songwriting shifted more towards pure punk and less ska.

== Track listing ==
No.	Title	Length
1.	"24 Hour Roadside Resistance"	1:57
2.	"Dinkas When I Close My Eyes"	1:40
3.	"Pestilent Existence"	2:18
4.	"Committing the Truth"	1:58
5.	"Nothing to Lose"	2:18
6.	"I Think You Think Too Much"	2:15
7.	"The Next Song"	3:28
8.	"Ugly Desires"	1:46
9.	"Killing the Truth"	2:51
10.	"Policeman"	1:45
11.	"I'm Weak Inside"	2:39
12.	"Stuck in a Rut"	2:30
13.	"The Excuse"	1:38
14.	"The Source of Strontium 90"	5:08

== Personnel ==
- Danny Lore - Vocals/Bass
- Joe Koontz - Guitar/Vocals
- Fin Leavell - Bass Trombone
- Spikey Goldbach - Drums
- Artwork by Omar Angulo
