= Dave Mello =

American drummer

- Born: 24 February 1969 (age 57); Oakland, California
- Genres: Ska, punk, hardcore
- Occupations: Songwriter, musician
- Instruments: Drums, vocals, guitar
- Years active: 1986–present
- Label: Lookout!

David Mello is an American musician known primarily for his work as drummer for the ska punk band Operation Ivy.

Prior to Operation Ivy, Mello played in various bands local to the Berkeley and Albany areas such as Rabbi Conspiracy and Distorted Truth

Upon Operation Ivy's formation, their first live appearances took place sequentially one weekend in May 1987. They first played in a garage in Albany, California, that Mello had frequently used for his other musical projects. The same weekend, Operation Ivy with Mello on drums made their initial appearance at 924 Gilman Street. Mello continued to play in Operation Ivy until the band's breakup in 1989, citing unwanted attention as the primary cause.

Following the disbandment of Operation Ivy, the remaining members with the exception of Jesse Michaels temporarily formed another punk/ska band, Downfall. Downfall included Mello's brother Pat Mello, who previously assisted Operation Ivy with backup vocals on some songs during the recording of their only studio release, Energy. Dave and Pat Mello parted ways with Tim Armstrong and Matt Freeman, who went on to form Rancid, starting their own band Schlong. Additionally, Dave has toured with other bands as a stand-in when needed.

Mello has also been involved in drumstick production with the company Twotone Drumsticks, contributing to the design of the Dave Mello signature variety.

In more recent times, Mello lives in SW Montana with his son Max. Still pursuing his musical aspirations, Dave plays drums and sings in Bozeman, MT bands Prints and Hippie Dump. He regularly appears at 924 Gilman Street, playing with multiple groups including the bands Jewdriver and Un'Cus where Mello has traded in his sticks for a guitar.
