= Jesse Michaels =

American singer-songwriter

- Born: April 1, 1969 (age 57); Berkeley, California, US
- Education: University of California, Los Angeles
- Occupations: Singer, songwriter, painter, illustrator, musician, author
- Years active: 1982–present
- Known for: Operation Ivy; Common Rider; Big Rig; Classics of Love; DOOM Regulator; Red Dons; Crimpshrine; Leftöver Crack; The Bruce Lee Band
- Spouse: Audrey Marrs
- Father: Leonard Michaels
- Musical career
- Genres: Punk rock, ska punk, hardcore punk, reggae

Jesse Michaels (born April 1, 1969) is an American songwriter, painter, illustrator, musician, singer, and author from Berkeley, California. His lyrics deal with politics, racism, and general social issues. He is most well known as the vocalist for the ska punk bands Operation Ivy (1987–1989), Common Rider (1999–2003), as well as Classics of Love (2009–approx. 2012). In 2023 Michaels formed the band DOOM Regulator. He is the son of the author Leonard Michaels, and was married to producer Audrey Marrs.

== Early life ==
Jesse Michaels was born in 1969 and he grew up in Berkeley, California, his parents are professor Priscilla Older and professor and writer Leonard Michaels.

In Berkeley he became involved with the local punk and hardcore music scene in the eighties. As a very young participant, he attended performances by many formative punk and hardcore bands. The Bay Area was also home to a small but enthusiastic second wave ska scene and Michaels was exposed to much two tone ska music, including performances by Berkeley's the Uptones. Michaels' early musical experimentation involved playing in garage bands including a primitive collaboration with Jeff Ott and Aaron Cometbus who would later go on to form the band Crimpshrine.

Throughout the eighties he was involved with the publication of fanzines, including 1987's Kill Deal for 50 Cents.

He was married to Audrey Marrs.

== Music ==
In 1987 he formed the band Operation Ivy with guitarist Tim Armstrong, bassist Matt Freeman, and drummer Dave Mello. They quickly became a popular band especially at the Berkeley punk club 924 Gilman Street. In 1987, the group released its debut extended play Hectic on which Michaels wrote all of the lyrics. It was followed with an American tour which brought the group's work all around the country, and made Operation Ivy a very well respected band. Operation Ivy recorded and released its only studio album, Energy, in 1989 and broke up the same year. Michaels also co-wrote the music to the Green Day song "2,000 Light Years Away" from their second album, Kerplunk (1992). He later formed Big Rig in 1994. Big Rig released one extended play and played several gigs around 924 Gilman Street before breaking up.

In 1999 after a long hiatus he formed Common Rider with Squirtgun bassist and producer Mass Giorgini. They released two albums and toured around the country before breaking up in 2003. In August 2008, Jesse went on a short Southern California tour with long-time friend Jeff Ott, playing new solo songs.

In December 2008, he participated in a small Northern California tour with Mike Park and Kevin Seconds, as well as formed a new band, Classics of Love. Michaels has stated in interviews and biographical material that the reason for his sporadic / intermittent involvement with music is that he does not consider himself a full-time musician, instead preferring to play music as an avocation rather than a career.

Michaels collaborated with former Operation Ivy bandmate Tim Armstrong for the 2013 original song, "Living In A Dangerous Land" as part of the Tim Timebomb And Friends series.

In 2015, Jesse sang on the track "System Fucked" featured on the Leftöver Crack album Constructs of the State.

In March 2023, Michaels and Tim Armstrong along with Circle Jerks drummer Joey Castillo and Trash Talk bassist Spencer Pollard formed the band Bad Optix and released their first single called "Raid". Armstrong promised more songs to come. Less than a week after announcing the formation of the band, the band changed their name to DOOM Regulator due to a band from Seattle already being called Bad Optics.

== Visual artwork ==
In 1996, Michaels graduated from University of California, Los Angeles (UCLA) where he received a BA degree in Literature. He is no longer an active musician, he cites punk music as a formative aesthetic influence and continues to direct his creative energies towards film, literature and visual art.

Michaels is also regarded as a talented artist, responsible for designing Operation Ivy's well-known and widely recognized "Ska Man" logo as well as other artwork for the album. In addition to drawing logos, album covers and other assorted art for his own musical projects, his artwork has been used by bands such as Filth, Neurosis, Green Day (for the band's debut album 39/Smooth) and Against All Authority.

Michaels has recently been making reprints of sketches and other art available for sale on eBay on a limited basis. As an oil painter, Michaels has exhibited his work around the West Coast.

In 2005, Jesse collaborated with Chris Appelgren of Lookout! Records to launch Dynaformer, an art/design collective dedicated to showcasing the artwork of both individuals, as well as offering their artistic talents for hire. Although Dynaformer was short-lived, Michaels and Apelgren continue to collaborate. In 2013 the pair teamed up to produce the cover of Michaels' debut novel as well as creating an EP design for a solo record by Murder City Devils' Spencer Moody.

== Publications ==
- Michaels, Jesse (2013). Whispering Bodies: A Roy Belkin Disaster. New York City: Soft Skull Press. ISBN 978-1593765309.

Michaels has expressed an interest in writing. In a 2010 interview, he told Jewcy magazine, "I have written one book. It's a novella and I'm sort of shopping it around and it might get published this year." The book was originally titled What The Dead Have To Say but Michaels received interest from Soft Skull Press, an independent imprint which is known for bridging the gap between literary fiction and fringe cultural interests. Soft Skull agreed to publish Michaels' novel but the title was changed to, Whispering Bodies: A Roy Belkin Disaster. The book was released in September 2013. Whispering Bodies is a comic novel about a recluse who is forced to enter the world at large to clear the name of a woman who he believes has been falsely accused of a crime.
