= Against All Authority =

American punk rock band

- Origin: Cutler Ridge, Florida, United States
- Genres: Anarcho-punk, punk rock, ska punk, hardcore punk
- Years active: 1992–2007, 2021–present
- Labels: Hopeless Records, Sub City, Records of Rebellion
- Members: Danny Lore; Joe Koontz; Marshall Wildey; Chris “Spikey” Goldbach

Against All Authority (often abbreviated AAA) is an American punk rock and ska punk band known for their political leanings. Their business practice follows a DIY ethic.

== History ==
Against All Authority was founded in Cutler Ridge, Florida, in 1992, driven by willingness to promote their message—"questioning our economic differences and promoting our human similarities". A strong engagement in political and social issues is clearly evident in their lyrics. The band maintain a fierce DIY stance influenced by the approach of the Dead Kennedys and Subhumans. Early in their career, the band decided to book concerts, make recordings and even produce band T-shirts on their own.

== Members ==
- Danny Lore – bass guitar & vocals
- Joe Koontz – guitar & vocals
- Fin "LP" Leavell – bass trombone & baritone saxophone
- Marshall Wildey - trumpet
- Chris “Spikey” Goldbach – drums

== Discography ==
=== Albums/EPs ===
- -AAA- Tape (1993)
- Above the Law EP (1994)
- Destroy What Destroys You (1996)
- All Fall Down (1998, Hopeless Records)
- 24 Hour Roadside Resistance (2000, Hopeless Records)
- Nothing New for Trash Like You (2001, Sub City Records)
- The Restoration of Chaos & Order (2006, Hopeless Records)

=== Split EPs ===
- Against All Authority / Less Than Jake (1995)
- Against All Authority / The Pist (1996, Records of Rebellion)
- Against All Authority / The Crumbs / Pink Lincolns / Gotohells (1996)
- Against All Authority / Anti-Flag - Reject EP (1996, Records of Rebellion)
- Against All Authority / The Criminals – Exchange EP (1999, Sub City Records)
- Against All Authority / Common Rider (2005, Hopeless Records)

=== Live recordings ===
- V.M.L Live Presents Against All Authority Live 7/16/95 (1996)
- Live On the Ska Parade Radio Show (1998)
