= Rancid discography =

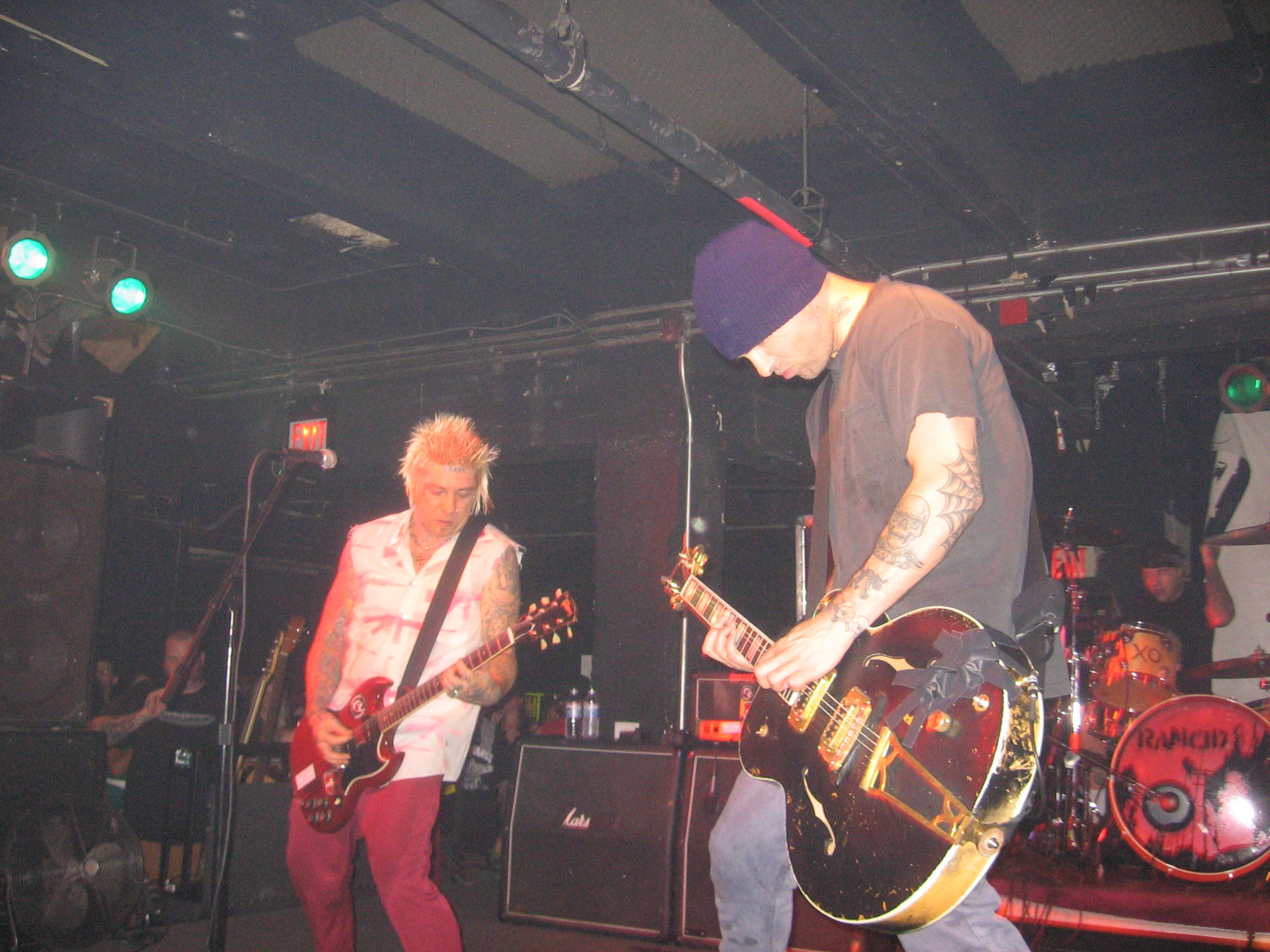
- Rancid in 2006. Pictured are Lars Frederiksen, Tim Armstrong and Brett Reed (back).
- Studio albums: 10
- Extended plays: 2
- Compilation albums: 4
- Singles: 27
- Video albums: 1
- Music videos: 37

The discography of Rancid, an American punk rock band, includes ten studio albums, two extended plays, two compilations, twenty-seven singles and thirty-seven music videos.

== Biography ==
Rancid were formed in 1991 by vocalist and guitarist Tim Armstrong and bassist Matt Freeman, who then recruited drummer Brett Reed. The band signed to Lookout! Records, and released its first EP, Rancid, in 1992. Later that year, they signed to Epitaph Records (a label owned by then-former and now-current Bad Religion guitarist Brett Gurewitz) and released their self-titled debut album in 1993. While Rancid was writing a second album, Green Day's Billie Joe Armstrong, a friend of the band, joined them to co-write the song "Radio". This led to him playing a live show with the band. Armstrong eventually asked Billie Joe to become a member of the band, but he decided to continue playing in Green Day. Armstrong had previously asked Lars Frederiksen to be Rancid's second guitarist, but he turned down the request. After Billie Joe declined, Frederiksen changed his mind and decided to join Rancid, making them a four piece.

Frederiksen was present on Rancid's second album, Let's Go, which was released in 1994 and spawned the radio hit "Salvation", which reached number 21 on the modern rock charts. Its U.S. release date, June 14, 1994, was also Freeman's 28th birthday. That year their label-mates, The Offspring, experienced a huge success with their album Smash. The Offspring took Rancid on tour with them, and helped Let's Go make it to number 97 on Billboard's Heatseekers and Billboard 200 charts, respectively. With the success of the album Rancid were pursued by several major labels, including Madonna's Maverick Records, but the band eventually turned down the idea of signing to a different label and decided to just stay on Epitaph.

In August 1995, Rancid released their third album, ...And Out Come the Wolves. The critically acclaimed album, also the band's most successful, debuted at number 45 on the Billboard 200, produced three singles, "Roots Radicals", "Time Bomb", and "Ruby Soho", which all charted on the North American Billboard Modern Rock Tracks, and the band performed two of these songs on Saturday Night Live. ...And Out Come the Wolves has continued to sell consistently well since its release, and on January 22, 1996 was certified gold by the RIAA. It was also certified platinum on September 23, 2004.

In 1998, Rancid returned to the scene with their fourth album, Life Won't Wait. That album branched out from Rancid's previous musical styles, and combined punk rock with elements of roots reggae, rockabilly, dub, hip-hop, and funk. Due to this it was often compared to The Clash's Sandinista!. Although not as successful as ...And Out Come the Wolves, Life Won't Wait peaked at number 35 on the Billboard 200 album chart, the highest position the band had attained at the time. After its release, Rancid moved to Armstrong's vanity label (and subsidiary of Epitaph) Hellcat Records. That label would release their next album, 2000's Rancid (Skull Cover), which was not as successful as Rancid's previous three releases, but is considered the band's most hardcore offering to date, which was released as a follow-up to the more ska and reggae oriented Life Won't Wait.

After the release of the Rancid (2000) album, Rancid went on hiatus while members were involved in their own projects. Frederiksen released a self-titled album with Lars Frederiksen and the Bastards in 2001 and Armstrong released an album with the Transplants a year later. Rancid released their sixth studio album, Indestructible, through joint distribution through Warner Bros. and Epitaph/Hellcat in August 2003. The album featured the hit song "Fall Back Down", and peaked at number 15, marking the highest initial charting album in Rancid's career. After the release of that album, Rancid went on hiatus again when all members decided to continue working on their projects.

After no activity at all in most of 2004 and 2005, Rancid reunited in 2006 to embark on a successful tour and played several acoustic sets as part of Hellcat Records' Hellcat Nights concert series at The Echo before Reed quit the band later that year. He was replaced by former Used drummer Branden Steineckert. Rancid released their long-awaited seventh studio album, Let the Dominoes Fall, on June 2, 2009 and was their first album of new material in nearly six years. After a five-year wait and many delays, Rancid released their eight studio album, Honor Is All We Know in October 2014. That album was followed three years later by Trouble Maker (2017). The band will release their tenth album, Tomorrow Never Comes, in June 2023. It marks the longest gap between studio albums in their career at six years. The album was once again produced by Epitaph Records founder Brett Gurewitz who has now produced six straight albums for the band and eight of the band's ten albums.

== Albums ==
=== Studio albums ===
List of studio albums, with selected chart positions and certifications
Title	Details	Peak chart positions										Certifications
Title	Details	US	AUS	AUT	CAN	FIN	FRA	GER	NZ	SWE	UK	Certifications
Rancid	Released: May 10, 1993; Record label: Epitaph; Format: CD, LP, CS, DD	—	—	—	—	—	—	—	—	—	—	
Let's Go	Released: June 14, 1994; Record label: Epitaph; Format: CD, LP, CS, DD	97	—	—	—	—	—	—	—	—	— (Note: Let's Go did not enter the UK Albums chart but peaked at number 31 on the UK Record Store chart.)	RIAA: Gold
...And Out Come the Wolves	Released: August 22, 1995; Record label: Epitaph; Format: CD, LP, CS, DD	45	30	—	27	30	—	74	—	39	55	RIAA: Platinum; ARIA: Gold; BPI: Gold; MC: Gold
Life Won't Wait	Released: June 30, 1998; Record label: Epitaph; Format: CD, LP, CS, DD	35	41	—	27	40	—	—	46	—	32	
Rancid	Released: August 1, 2000; Record label: Hellcat; Format: CD, LP, CS, DD	68	73	—	25	39	—	—	—	—	68	
Indestructible	Released: August 19, 2003; Record label: Warner Bros. (CD), Hellcat (LP); Format: CD, LP, DD	15	48	59	14	—	84	81	—	35	29	
Let the Dominoes Fall	Released: June 2, 2009; Record label: Hellcat; Format: CD, LP, DD	11	31	—	7	29	165	48	32	27	41	
...Honor Is All We Know	Released: October 27, 2014; Record label: Hellcat; Format: CD, LP, CS, DD	20	34	58	25	—	157	84	40	—	45	
Trouble Maker	Released: June 9, 2017; Record label: Hellcat; Format: CD, LP, DD	23	41	33	55	—	189	21	— (Note: Trouble Maker did not enter the NZ Top 40 Albums Chart, but peaked at number four on the NZ Heatseekers Albums Chart.)	— (Note: Trouble Maker did not enter the Sverigetopplistan Albums chart but peaked at number eight on the Sverigetopplistan Vinyl Albums chart.)	57	
Tomorrow Never Comes	Released: June 2, 2023; Record label: Hellcat/Epitaph; Format: CD, LP, DD	126	51	—	—	49	—	12	—	— (Note: Tomorrow Never Comes did not enter the Sverigetopplistan Albums chart but peaked at number nine on the Sverigetopplistan Vinyl Albums chart.)	86	
"—" denotes a release that did not chart.

=== Split albums ===
Title	Details	Other artist(s)	Peak chart positions				
Title	Details	Other artist(s)	US	US Indie	SCO	UK	UK Indie
BYO Split Series, Vol. 3	Released: March 5, 2002; Label: BYO; Format: CD, LP, DD	NOFX	147	6	96	75	12

=== Compilation albums ===
Title	Details
B Sides and C Sides	Released: January 15, 2008; Label: Rancid; Format: CD, DD
Essentials Box Set	Released: Upcoming; Label: Pirate's Press; Format: 7"
Essentials 7" album packs	Released: Upcoming; Label: Pirate's Press; Format: 7"
All the Moon Stompers	Released: 2015; Label: Randale records, Chase The Ace Records; Format: CD, 2xLP

=== Video albums ===
Title	Details
The Music Videos: 1993-2003	Released: April 2008; Label: Rancid; Format: DVD

== Extended plays ==
Title	Details
Rancid	Released: January 1992; Label: Lookout!; Format: Vinyl
Radio Radio Radio	Released: August 26, 1993; Label: Fat Wreck Chords; Format: Vinyl
Let Me Go	Released: October 16, 2000; Label: Hellcat Records; Format: Vinyl, CD

== Singles ==
=== As lead artist ===
Title	Year	Peak chart positions										Album
Title	Year	US Air	US Alt	US Rock	AUS	CAN Rock	CZ Rock	MEX	SCO	UK	UK Indie	Album
"Hyena"	1993	—	—	—	—	—	—	—	—	—	—	Rancid (1993)
"Nihilism"	1994	—	—	—	—	—	—	—	—	—	—	Let's Go
"Salvation"	1995	—	21	—	—	—	—	—	—	—	—	Let's Go
"Roots Radicals"	1995	—	27	—	—	—	—	—	—	—	—	...And Out Come the Wolves
"Time Bomb"	1995	48	8	—	76	7	—	—	67	56	—	...And Out Come the Wolves
"Ruby Soho"	1995	63	13	—	64	9	—	—	—	—	—	...And Out Come the Wolves
"Bloodclot"	1998	—	—	—	—	—	—	—	97	98	15	Life Won't Wait
"Hooligans"	1998	—	—	—	—	—	—	—	—	162	43	Life Won't Wait
"Who Would've Thought"	1998	—	—	—	—	—	—	—	—	—	—	Life Won't Wait
"Let Me Go"	2000	—	—	—	—	—	—	—	—	188	48	Rancid (2000)
"Radio Havana"	2000	—	—	—	—	—	—	—	—	—	—	Rancid (2000)
"Sick Sick World"	2003	—	—	—	—	—	—	—	—	—	—	Non-album single
"Fall Back Down"	2003	—	13	—	92	—	—	—	47	42	—	Indestructible
"Red Hot Moon"	2004	—	—	—	—	—	—	—	—	—	—	Indestructible
"Tropical London"	2004	—	—	—	—	—	—	—	—	—	—	Indestructible
"Last One to Die"	2009	—	22	44	—	36	3	20	—	—	—	Let the Dominoes Fall
"Up to No Good"	2009	—	—	—	—	—	—	—	—	—	—	Let the Dominoes Fall
"Fuck You"	2012	—	—	—	—	—	—	—	—	—	—	Non-album singles
"Turn In Your Badge"	2014	—	—	—	—	—	—	—	—	—	—	Non-album singles
"Collision Course"	2014	—	—	—	—	—	—	—	—	—	—	...Honor Is All We Know
"Ghost of a Chance"	2017	—	—	—	—	—	—	—	—	—	—	Trouble Maker
"Bovver Rock and Roll"	2017	—	—	— (Note: "Bovver Rock and Roll" did not chart on the Hot Rock & Alternative Songs chart but did peak at number 36 on the Mainstream Rock chart.)	—	—	—	—	—	—	—	Trouble Maker
"Tomorrow Never Comes"	2023	—	—	—	—	—	—	—	—	—	—	Tomorrow Never Comes
"Don't Make Me Do It"	2023	—	—	—	—	—	—	—	—	—	—	Tomorrow Never Comes
"Devil in Disguise"	2023	—	—	—	—	—	—	—	—	—	—	Tomorrow Never Comes
"New American"	2023	—	—	—	—	—	—	—	—	—	—	Tomorrow Never Comes
"Live Forever"	2023	—	—	—	—	—	—	—	—	—	—	Tomorrow Never Comes
"—" denotes a release that did not chart.

=== Split singles ===
Title	Year	Other artist(s)	Notes
"East Bay Night" / "England Belongs to Me"	2012	Cock Sparrer	Label: Pirates Press; Tour exclusive limited edition 7" red vinyl

== Music videos ==
Year	Title	Director	Album
1993	"Hyena"	Isaac Camner	Rancid (1993)
1994	"Nihilism"	Tim Armstrong	Let's Go
1994	"Salvation"	Tim Armstrong/Mark Kohr	Let's Go
1995	"Roots Radicals"	Tim Armstrong	...And Out Come the Wolves
1995	"Time Bomb"	Marcus Raboy	...And Out Come the Wolves
1995	"Ruby Soho"	Tim Armstrong/Jim Guerinot	...And Out Come the Wolves
1997	"The Harder They Come"	Evan Bernard	Tibetan Freedom Concert
1998	"Bloodclot"	Rancid/Nick Egan	Life Won't Wait
1998	"Backslide"	Tim Armstrong/Rancid	Life Won't Wait
1998	"Who Would've Thought"	Tim Armstrong/Rancid	Life Won't Wait
1998	"Leicester Square"	Tim Armstrong/Rancid	Life Won't Wait
1998	"Hooligans"	Tim Armstrong/Rancid	Life Won't Wait
1998	"Crane Fist"	Tim Armstrong/Rancid	Life Won't Wait
2000	"GGF (Golden Gate Fields)"	Tim Armstrong	Rancid (2000)
2000	"Young Al Capone"	Tim Armstrong	Rancid (2000)
2000	"Let Me Go"	Tim Armstrong	Rancid (2000)
2000	"I Am Forever"	Tim Armstrong	Rancid (2000)
2000	"Dead Bodies"	Tim Armstrong	Rancid (2000)
2000	"Rwanda"	Tim Armstrong	Rancid (2000)
2000	"Blackhawk Down"	Tim Armstrong	Rancid (2000)
2000	"Black Derby Jacket"	Tim Armstrong	Rancid (2000)
2000	"Rattlesnake"	Tim Armstrong	Rancid (2000)
2000	"Poison"	Tim Armstrong	Rancid (2000)
2000	"Loki"	Tim Armstrong	Rancid (2000)
2003	"Fall Back Down"	Tim Armstrong/Nazeli Kodjoian	Indestructible
2003	"Red Hot Moon"	Evan Bernard	Indestructible
2003	"Spirit of '87"		Indestructible
2009	"Last One to Die"	Tim Armstrong	Let the Dominoes Fall
2009	"Up to No Good"	Tim Armstrong	Let the Dominoes Fall
2014	"Collision Course"/"Honor Is All We Know"/Evil's My Friend"	Tim Armstrong/Kevin Kerslake	Honor Is All We Know
2017	"Ghost of a Chance"		Trouble Maker
2017	"Telegraph Avenue"		Trouble Maker
2023	"Tomorrow Never Comes"	Tim Armstrong/Kevin Kerslake	Tomorrow Never Comes
2023	"Don't Make Me Do It"	Tim Armstrong/Kevin Kerslake	Tomorrow Never Comes
2023	"Devil in Disguise"	Tim Armstrong/Kevin Kerslake	Tomorrow Never Comes
2023	"New American"	Tim Armstrong/Kevin Kerslake	Tomorrow Never Comes
2023	"Live Forever"	Tim Armstrong/Kevin Kerslake	Tomorrow Never Comes

== Compilation appearances ==
- "Brixton" - Rock Stars Kill 1994
- "Can't Forgive" - Land of Greed... World of Need (Embrace tribute) 1994
- "Hyena," "I Wanna Riot" - Punk-O-Rama Vol. 1 1994
- "I Wanna Riot (feat. Stubborn All-Stars)" - Beavis and Butt-Head Do America soundtrack 1996
- "Just a Feeling" - "Fat Music For Fat People" 1994
- "Sidekick" - Punk-O-Rama Vol. 2 1996
- "The Brothels" - Give 'Em the Boot 1997
- "The Harder They Come" - Tibetan Freedom Concert 1997
- "Rats in the Hallway" - Punk-O-Rama Vol. 3 1998
- "Brad Logan" - Chef Aid: The South Park Album 1998
- "Lethal" - Skaliente 1998
- "Kill the Lights" - Old Skars and Upstarts 1998
- "Cheat" - "Burning London: The Clash Tribute" 1999
- "Blacklisted" - Short Music for Short People 1999
- "If the Kids Are United" - Give 'Em the Boot II 1999
- "Misty Days" (Buju Banton w/ Rancid) - Give 'Em the Boot II 1999
- "Bruk Out" (Buccaneer w/ Rancid) - Give 'Em the Boot II 1999
- "1998" - Punk-O-Rama Vol. 4 1999
- "No More Misty Days" (w/ Buju Banton) - Unchained Spirit 2000
- "Maxwell Murder" - Dave Mira Freestyle BMX Soundtrack 2000
- "Poison" - Punk-O-Rama Vol. 5 2000
- "It's Quite Alright" - Punk-O-Rama Vol. 6 2001
- "Golden Gate Fields" - Give 'Em the Boot III 2002
- "Bob" - Punk-O-Rama Vol. 7 2002
- "Sheena Is a Punk Rocker" - We're a Happy Family - A Tribute to Ramones 2003
- "Out of Control" - Need for Speed: Underground soundtrack 2003
- "As Wicked" - Punk-O-Rama Vol. 8 2003
- "Killing Zone" - Give 'Em the Boot IV 2004
- "Tropical London" - Punk-O-Rama Vol. 9 2004
- "Fall Back Down" - Tony Hawk's Underground 2 soundtrack 2004
- "White Knuckle Ride" - Punk-O-Rama Vol. 10 2005
- "Tattoo" - Give 'Em the Boot V 2006
- "Endrina" - Give 'Em the Boot VI 2007
- "Salvation" - Guitar Hero II soundtrack (appears as a cover made by the game producers, only in the Xbox 360 version) 2007
- "Fuck You" - Oi! This is Streetpunk, Volume Two 2012
- "Silence is the Only Rule" - Oi! Ain't Dead 5 - Rebellion Records 2016

== Official live recordings ==
At the end of 2006, Rancid started selling official live recordings on their official website. The following shows from the Summer Tour of 2006 were professionally recorded and sold in mp3 and FLAC format.

- Live in Canada Recorded: December 9, 2006 Venue: Montreal
- Live in the UK Recorded: November 20, 2006 Venue: Brighton UK
- Live in the UK Recorded: November 19, 2006 Venue: Bristol UK
- Live in the UK Recorded: November 16, 2006 Venue: London, UK
- Live in the UK Recorded: November 13, 2006 Venue: Newcastle UK
- Live in the UK Recorded: November 12, 2006 Venue: Nottingham, UK
- Summer Tour 2006 Recorded: October 16, 2006 Venue: Live from San Diego
- Summer Tour 2006 Recorded: October 11, 2006 Venue: Live from Anaheim
- Summer Tour 2006 Recorded: October 6, 2006 Venue: Live from Salt Lake City
- Summer Tour 2006 Recorded: October 5, 2006 Venue: Live from Salt Lake City
- Summer Tour 2006 Recorded: October 1, 2006 Venue: Live from Calgary
- Summer Tour 2006 Recorded: September 13, 2006 Venue: Live from Minneapolis
- Summer Tour 2006 Recorded: September 12, 2006 The House of Blues: Live from Chicago
- Summer Tour 2006 Recorded: September 11, 2006 The House of Blues: Live from Chicago
- Summer Tour 2006 Recorded: September 9, 2006 Venue: Live from Detroit
- Summer Tour 2006 Recorded: September 8, 2006 Venue: Live from Detroit
- Summer Tour 2006 Recorded: September 7, 2006 Venue: Live from Columbus
- Summer Tour 2006 Recorded: September 6, 2006 Venue: Live from Cleveland
- Summer Tour 2006 Recorded: August 27, 2006 Venue: Live from New York City
- Summer Tour 2006 Recorded: August 26, 2006 Venue: Live from New York City
- Summer Tour 2006 Recorded: August 25, 2006 Venue: Live from New York City
- Summer Tour 2006 Recorded: August 24, 2006 Venue: Live from New York City
- Summer Tour 2006 Recorded: August 23, 2006 Venue: Live from Boston
- Summer Tour 2006 Recorded: August 20, 2006 Venue: Live from Philadelphia
- Summer Tour 2006 Recorded: August 19, 2006 Venue: Live from Philadelphia
- Summer Tour 2006 Recorded: August 18, 2006 Venue: Live from Washington DC
- Summer Tour 2006 Recorded: August 17, 2006 Venue: Live from Washington DC
- Summer Tour 2006 Recorded: August 16, 2006 Venue: Live from Washington DC
- Summer Tour 2006 Recorded: August 1, 2006 Venue: Live from Albuquerue
- Summer Tour 2006 Recorded: July 21, 2006 Venue: Live from Miami
- Summer Tour 2006 Recorded: July 19, 2006 Venue: Live from Orlando
