= List of songs in Guitar Hero II =

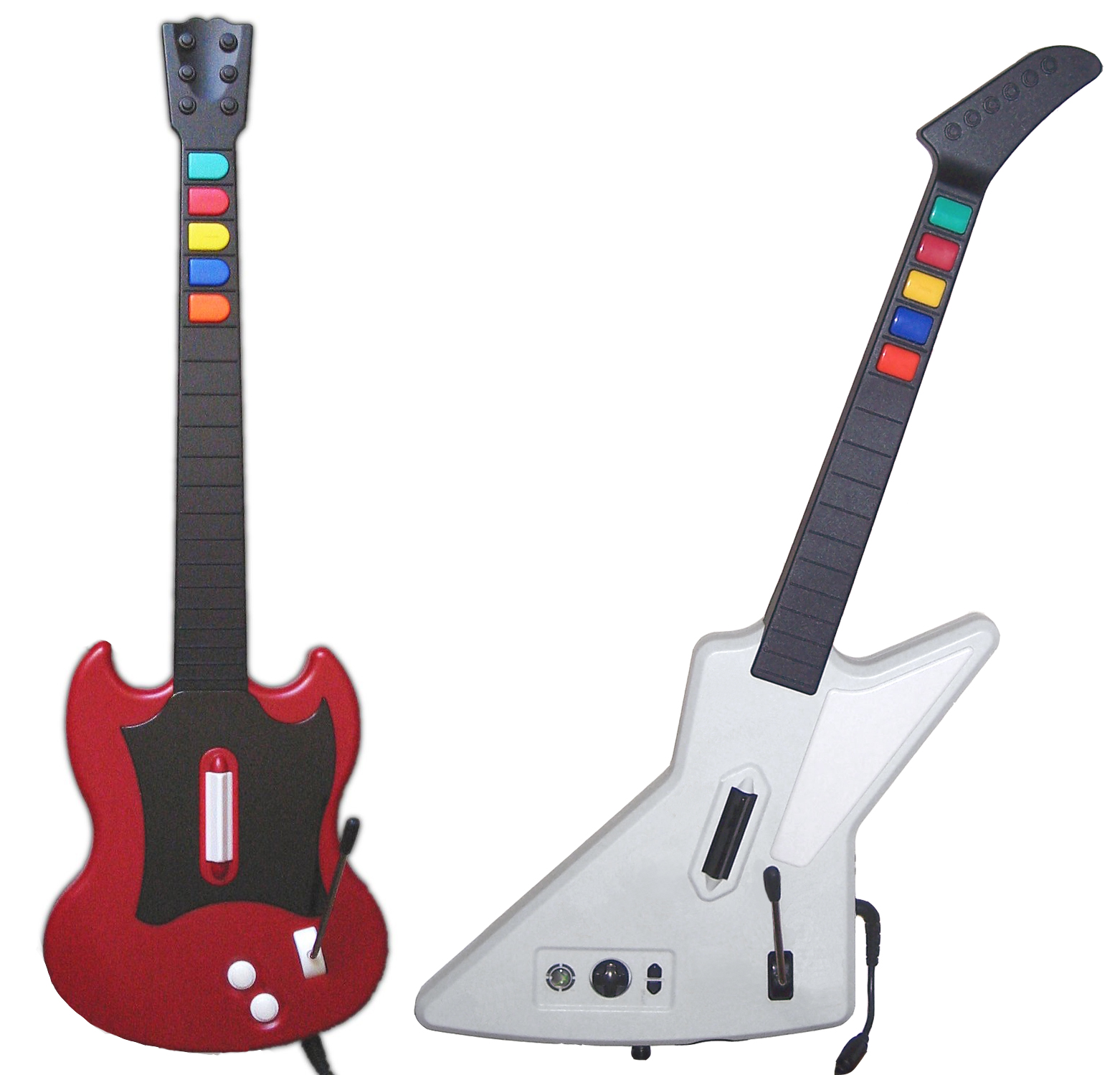
The guitar controllers bundled with Guitar Hero II: cherry red Gibson SG (PS2) and Gibson Explorer (Xbox 360)

Guitar Hero II is a music video game developed by Harmonix and distributed by RedOctane, and is a sequel to Guitar Hero. The game was released first to PlayStation 2 in 2006 but later released for the Xbox 360 in 2007. Guitar Hero II challenges players to recreate the lead guitar portions of many rock music songs using a specially designed guitar-shaped controller, based on either a Gibson SG for the PlayStation 2 version, a Gibson Explorer for the Xbox 360 version, or else a standard console controller. As notes scroll down the screen towards the player, the player must hit both the fret buttons on the guitar controller and the strum bar at the same time to successfully hit the notes. Successfully hitting notes improves the player's performance in the game and also raises their score, while missing notes will reduce the player's performance, and a poor performance may end the song prematurely. Each song can be played at one of four difficulty levels: Easy, Medium, Hard and Expert. These levels reflect the number of fret buttons used and the number and frequency of the notes to be performed.

There are 64 songs total in the PlayStation 2 version while there are 74 songs total for the later Xbox 360 version. The Xbox 360 version adds an additional 24 downloadable songs via Xbox Live Marketplace, bringing the total to 98 songs.

== Game disc songs ==
=== Main setlist ===
There are 40 songs in the main Career mode for the PlayStation 2 version, and 48 songs in the Xbox 360 version. Songs are organized by tiers that are related to the song's difficulty, and there are differences between the PlayStation 2 and Xbox 360 ordering due to the extra songs. Each tier at a given difficulty is unlocked in order, and a tier is completed once three to five songs (depending on the difficulty level) and the tier's encore song are successfully completed. Once a song is unlocked in a tier at any difficulty, it is available for the quick play, competitive, and co-operative modes.

Most songs in the game are covers of the original songs performed by WaveGroup Sound, but there are some master recordings as indicated below. Each song has a lead guitar track and either a bass or rhythm guitar track that can be played in practice or cooperative modes.

Year	Song title	Artist	Original Master Recording	PlayStation 2 Tier	Xbox 360 Tier
1977	"Bad Reputation"	Thin Lizzy	No	5. Return of the Shred	5. Return of the Shred
2006	"Beast and the Harlot"	Avenged Sevenfold	No	8. Face-Melters	8. Face-Melters
1973	"Billion Dollar Babies"	Alice Cooper	No	—	3. String-Snappers
1971	"Can't You Hear Me Knockin'"^{a}	The Rolling Stones	No	4. Thrash and Burn	4. Thrash and Burn
2000	"Carry Me Home"	The Living End	No	7. Furious Fretwork	8. Face-Melters
1976	"Carry On Wayward Son"	Kansas	No	2. Amp Warmers; Encore	3. String-Snappers
1990	"Cherry Pie"	Warrant	No	4. Thrash and Burn	2. Amp Warmers
1976	"Crazy on You"	Heart	No	6. Relentless Riffs	6. Relentless Riffs
2006	"Dead!"^{a}	My Chemical Romance	Yes	—	6. Relentless Riffs
1973	"Free Bird"^{a}	Lynyrd Skynyrd	No	8. Face-Melters; Encore	8. Face-Melters; Encore
2006	"Freya"	The Sword	No	5. Return of the Shred	6. Relentless Riffs
1991	"Girlfriend"^{a}	Matthew Sweet	No	4. Thrash and Burn	4. Thrash and Burn
1990	"Hangar 18"	Megadeth	No	8. Face-Melters	8. Face-Melters
1993	"Heart-Shaped Box"	Nirvana	No	2. Amp Warmers	1. Opening Licks
1968	"Hush"	Deep Purple	No	—	4. Thrash and Burn
1983	"Institutionalized"^{a}	Suicidal Tendencies	No	8. Face-Melters	8. Face-Melters
1973	"Jessica"^{a}	The Allman Brothers Band	No	6. Relentless Riffs	5. Return of the Shred
1990	"John the Fisherman"	Primus	Yes	5. Return of the Shred	5. Return of the Shred
1992	"Killing in the Name"	Rage Against the Machine	No	5. Return of the Shred	6. Relentless Riffs
2004	"Laid to Rest"^{a}	Lamb of God	No	7. Furious Fretwork	7. Furious Fretwork
1976	"Last Child"^{a}	Aerosmith	No	5. Return of the Shred; Encore	5. Return of the Shred; Encore
2006	"Life Wasted"	Pearl Jam	No	—	2. Amp Warmers
1985	"Madhouse"	Anthrax	No	7. Furious Fretwork	7. Furious Fretwork
1979	"Message in a Bottle"	The Police	No	2. Amp Warmers	3. String-Snappers
1962	"Misirlou"	Dick Dale	No	8. Face-Melters	8. Face-Melters
1997	"Monkey Wrench"	Foo Fighters	No	3. String-Snappers	4. Thrash and Burn
1988	"Mother"^{a}	Danzig	No	1. Opening Licks	2. Amp Warmers
1994	"Possum Kingdom"	Toadies	Yes	—	1. Opening Licks
1990	"Psychobilly Freakout"	Reverend Horton Heat	No	7. Furious Fretwork	7. Furious Fretwork
1973	"Rock and Roll, Hoochie Koo"	Rick Derringer	No	—	5. Return of the Shred
1981	"Rock This Town"	Stray Cats	No	6. Relentless Riffs	7. Furious Fretwork
1994	"Salvation"	Rancid	No	—	1. Opening Licks
1973	"Search and Destroy"	Iggy Pop and the Stooges	No	3. String-Snappers	3. String-Snappers
1983	"Shout at the Devil"	Mötley Crüe	No	1. Opening Licks	1. Opening Licks; Encore
1990	"Stop"	Jane's Addiction	Yes	6. Relentless Riffs; Encore	6. Relentless Riffs; Encore
1974	"Strutter"^{a}	Kiss	No	2. Amp Warmers	1. Opening Licks
1978	"Surrender"	Cheap Trick	No	1. Opening Licks	1. Opening Licks
1987	"Sweet Child o' Mine"	Guns N' Roses	No	4. Thrash and Burn; Encore	4. Thrash and Burn; Encore
1980	"Tattooed Love Boys"	The Pretenders	No	3. String-Snappers	5. Return of the Shred
1992	"Them Bones"	Alice in Chains	No	3. String-Snappers	3. String-Snappers
1984	"Tonight I'm Gonna Rock You Tonight"^{a}	Spinal Tap	No	1. Opening Licks; Encore	2. Amp Warmers; Encore
1996	"Trippin' on a Hole in a Paper Heart"	Stone Temple Pilots	No	6. Relentless Riffs	6. Relentless Riffs
1983	"The Trooper"	Iron Maiden	No	—	7. Furious Fretwork
1970	"War Pigs"	Black Sabbath	No	3. String-Snappers; Encore	3. String-Snappers; Encore
1993	"Who Was in My Room Last Night?"^{a}	The Butthole Surfers	No	4. Thrash and Burn	4. Thrash and Burn
2006	"Woman"	Wolfmother	No	1. Opening Licks	2. Amp Warmers
1978	"You Really Got Me"	Van Halen	No	2. Amp Warmers	2. Amp Warmers
1981	"YYZ"	Rush	No	7. Furious Fretwork; Encore	7. Furious Fretwork; Encore

- ^a Song has a rhythm guitar track instead of a bass guitar co-operative play track.

=== Bonus songs ===
There are 24 bonus songs in the PlayStation 2 version of Guitar Hero II and 2 additional songs for the Xbox 360 version. All bonus songs are unlockable by using in-game money within the game's store. Once purchased, they are playable in quick play, competitive, and co-operative modes. The song "Raw Dog" by The Last Vegas was selected as part of the "Be a Guitar Hero" contest for the release of Guitar Hero II.

All bonus songs are master recordings, and where marked, include rhythm guitar rather than bass guitar tracks.

Year	Song title	Artist
2006	"Arterial Black" (Note: Song has a rhythm guitar track instead of a bass guitar co-operative play track.)	Drist
2006	"Collide"	Anarchy Club
2006	"Drink Up" (Note: Song is exclusive to the Xbox 360 version.)	Ounce of Self
2006	"Elephant Bones"	That Handsome Devil
2006	"Fall of Pangea"	Valient Thorr
2006	"FTK"	VAGIANT
2004	"Gemini"	Brian Kahanek
2006	"Jordan"	Buckethead
2006	"Kicked to the Curb"	Noble Rot
2006	"Laughtrack"	The Acro-Brats
2006	"Less Talk More Rokk"	Freezepop
2000	"Mr. Fix It"	The Amazing Crowns
2006	"One for the Road"	The Breaking Wheel
2006	"Parasite"	The Neighborhoods
2006	"Push Push (Lady Lightning)"	Bang Camaro
2006	"Radium Eyes"	Count Zero
2006	"Raw Dog"	The Last Vegas
2006	"Red Lottery"	Megasus
2006	"Six"	All That Remains
2006	"Soy Bomb"	Honest Bob and the Factory-to-Dealer Incentives
2004	"The Light That Blinds"	Shadows Fall
2006	"The New Black"	Every Time I Die
2006	"Thunderhorse"	Dethklok
2003	"Trogdor"	Strong Bad
2006	"X-Stream"	Voivod
2006	"Yes We Can"	Made in Mexico

== Downloadable content ==
The Xbox 360 version of the game allows for the use of downloadable content available through Xbox Live Marketplace. These are typically released as packs of three, or as single song. These packs include songs from the original Guitar Hero for the PlayStation 2. Additional packs consist of songs that have not been featured in Guitar Hero before, and are masters, even though some are indicated as covers in the game. As of April 1, 2014, these songs are no longer available in the Xbox Live Marketplace.

Year	Song title	Artist	Master recording?	Release date	Single / Pack
1983	"Bark at the Moon"	Ozzy Osbourne	No	Apr. 11, 2007	Guitar Hero Track Pack 1
2004	"Hey You"	The Exies	No	Apr. 11, 2007	Guitar Hero Track Pack 1
1980	"Ace of Spades"	Motörhead	No	Apr. 11, 2007	Guitar Hero Track Pack 1
1974	"Killer Queen"	Queen	No	Apr. 11, 2007	Guitar Hero Track Pack 2
2002	"Take It Off"	The Donnas	No	Apr. 11, 2007	Guitar Hero Track Pack 2
1973	"Frankenstein"	The Edgar Winter Group	No	Apr. 11, 2007	Guitar Hero Track Pack 2
1989	"Higher Ground"	Red Hot Chili Peppers	No	Apr. 11, 2007	Guitar Hero Track Pack 3
1994	"Infected"	Bad Religion	No	Apr. 11, 2007	Guitar Hero Track Pack 3
2000	"Stellar"	Incubus	No	Apr. 11, 2007	Guitar Hero Track Pack 3
1978	"I Wanna Be Sedated"	The Ramones	No	Jul. 11, 2007	Guitar Hero Track Pack 4
1972	"Smoke on the Water"	Deep Purple	No	Jul. 11, 2007	Guitar Hero Track Pack 4
1982	"You've Got Another Thing Comin'"	Judas Priest	No	Jul. 11, 2007	Guitar Hero Track Pack 4
2006	"Famous Last Words"	My Chemical Romance	Yes	Aug. 14, 2007	My Chemical Romance Pack
2006	"Teenagers"	My Chemical Romance	Yes	Aug. 14, 2007	My Chemical Romance Pack
2006	"This Is How I Disappear"	My Chemical Romance	Yes	Aug. 14, 2007	My Chemical Romance Pack
2006	"Detonation"	Trivium	Yes	Sep. 28, 2007	Guitar Hero Indie Label Pack
2006	"Ex's And Oh's"	Atreyu	Yes	Sep. 28, 2007	Guitar Hero Indie Label Pack
2005	"Bury the Hatchet"	Protest the Hero	Yes	Sep. 28, 2007	Guitar Hero Indie Label Pack
1993	"Sin Documentos"	Los Rodríguez	Yes	Oct. 15, 2007	Single
2006	"Sept"	Pleymo	Yes	Oct. 15, 2007	Single
2007	"Exile"	Soilwork	Yes	Oct. 15, 2007	Single
2007	"The State of Massachusetts"	Dropkick Murphys	Yes	Nov. 29, 2007	Guitar Hero Indie Label Pack II
2007	"You Should Be Ashamed of Myself"	The Bled	Yes	Nov. 29, 2007	Guitar Hero Indie Label Pack II
2007	"Memories of the Grove"	Maylene and the Sons of Disaster	Yes	Nov. 29, 2007	Guitar Hero Indie Label Pack II
