= Ruby Soho =

Ruby Soho may refer to:

- Ruby Soho (song)
- Ruby Soho (wrestler)
