= Salvation (Rancid song) =

Single by Rancid

from the album Let's Go
- Released: 1995 (as a single)
- Recorded: October 1993 – March 1994 at Fantasy Studios, Berkeley, California
- Genre: Alternative rock; street punk
- Length: 2:54
- Label: Epitaph
- Songwriter(s): Tim Armstrong / Matt Freeman
- Producer(s): Brett Gurewitz

Rancid singles chronology
""Nihilism"" (1994)	"Salvation" (1995)	""Roots Radicals"" (1995)

"Salvation" is a song by the American punk rock band Rancid. It was released as the second single from its second studio album, Let's Go.

Along with "Time Bomb" and "Ruby Soho", "Salvation" is considered to be one of Rancid's breakthrough songs, as it received airplay from modern rock radio stations; it was also the band's first single to reach any Billboard singles charts. Spin listed the song as one of the best alternative rock songs of 1994.

== In popular culture ==
- A cover version by Harmonix is featured in the Xbox 360 version of Guitar Hero II.
- Comedy punk band The Radioactive Chicken Heads recorded a cover of this song as "Just for the Taste of It", satirically re-working the lyrics into an advertisement for Diet Coke. The song appeared on their 2000 album Keep On Cluckin' and later their 2009 rarities album Poultry Uprising.
- It is featured in the pilot episode of Buffy the Vampire Slayer, though it was not used in the actual first episode.

== Charts ==
Chart	Position
Billboard Modern Rock Tracks	21
