= Last One to Die =

Single by Rancid

from the album Let the Dominoes Fall
- Released: April 6, 2009
- Recorded: January 2008–February 2009 at Skywalker Sound
- Genre: Punk rock
- Length: 2:24
- Label: Hellcat
- Songwriters: Tim Armstrong, Lars Frederiksen, Matt Freeman
- Producer: Brett Gurewitz

Rancid singles chronology
"Tropical London" (2004)	"Last One to Die" (2009)	"Up to No Good" (2009)

"Last One to Die" is a song by the American punk rock band Rancid. It was released as the first single from their seventh album, Let the Dominoes Fall. It first premiered on April 6, 2009 on the Los Angeles modern rock radio station, KROQ. Frontman Tim Armstrong explained that the song, "is about the survival of our band. Over the last eighteen years we've seen a lot of bands and friends pass on, quit or move on for various reasons, yet we keep moving forward." The song impacted radio on April 21, 2009. A music video was also produced and released for the song on May 12, 2009. The song's music video features many cameos including WWE wrestlers CM Punk and Lita.

== In popular culture ==
"Last One to Die" was released as downloadable content for the music video game Rock Band on July 21, 2009, along with "Ruby Soho" and "Time Bomb."
