= Rancid (1993 album) =

Studio album by Rancid
- Released: May 10, 1993
- Recorded: September 1992 – January 1993
- Studio: Westbeach Recorders in Culver City, California
- Genre: Punk rock; hardcore punk; street punk; skate punk
- Length: 34:15
- Label: Epitaph
- Producer: Donnell Cameron

Rancid chronology
| Rancid (1992) | Rancid (1993) | Radio Radio Radio (1993) |

Rancid is the debut studio album by the American punk rock band Rancid. It was released on May 10, 1993, through Epitaph Records.

It is the only album to feature the band as a trio (guitarist/vocalist Lars Frederiksen would later join the band for the album's supporting tour), as well as one of three albums not to be produced by Brett Gurewitz (the others being ...And Out Come the Wolves and Life Won't Wait). However, Gurewitz provided backing vocals on the album.

It was also the second of three self-titled releases, the others being the group's debut extended play (1992) and its fifth studio album (2000). This album has been dubbed "Rancid Rancid." Until 2017's Trouble Maker, this was the only Rancid album not to feature their iconic logo on the cover. In 2019, the Brooklyn Vegan ranked the album as their 6th best album.

== Reception ==
Professional ratings
Review scores
| Source | Rating |
|---|---|
| AllMusic | 3.5/5 stars |
| Robert Christgau | (2-star Honorable Mention) |

Mike DaRonco of AllMusic stated "This is where it all starts. Without any reminiscing about their former band, Operation Ivy, Matt Freeman (bass) and Tim Armstrong (guitar/vocals) blast through their debut without any hints of ska or blatant Clash plagiarizing. On the contrary, this album rips through 15 tracks of high-energy punk that's accompanied by heavy bass leads and Armstrong's permanently slurred vocals. And to top it all off, the lyrical content deals with urban blight and the lifestyle of being a public nuisance. With this trademark sound, Rancid provide the perfect soundtrack for any car chase that includes massive property damage; is it a wonder MTV wouldn't touch this?"

== Track listing ==
All tracks are written by Tim Armstrong and Matt Freeman, except where noted.

| No. | Title | Lead vocals | Length |
|---|---|---|---|
| 1. | "Adina" | Freeman, Armstrong | 1:40 |
| 2. | "Hyena" | Armstrong | 2:55 |
| 3. | "Detroit" | Armstrong, Freeman | 2:24 |
| 4. | "Rats in the Hallway" | Armstrong | 2:22 |
| 5. | "Another Night" | Armstrong | 1:53 |
| 6. | "Animosity" | Armstrong | 2:25 |
| 7. | "Outta My Mind" (written by Armstrong, Eric Dinn, Freeman) | Armstrong | 2:23 |
| 8. | "Whirlwind" | Armstrong | 2:15 |
| 9. | "Rejected" | Freeman, Armstrong | 2:12 |
| 10. | "Injury" | Armstrong | 2:06 |
| 11. | "The Bottle" | Armstrong | 2:05 |
| 12. | "Trenches" | Armstrong | 2:04 |
| 13. | "Holiday Sunrise" | Armstrong | 1:46 |
| 14. | "Unwritten Rules" | Freeman, Armstrong | 1:42 |
| 15. | "Union Blood" (hidden track; not listed on the back cover) | Armstrong | 2:04 |
| 16. | "Get Out of My Way" (written by Dinn and Eric Raider; originally performed by The Uptones) | Armstrong | 1:59 |
| Total length: | | | 34:15 |

== Personnel ==
- Tim Armstrong – guitar, vocals
- Matt Freeman – bass guitar, vocals
- Brett Reed – drums, backing vocals

Additional musicians

- Jeff Abarta; Jay Bentley; Brett Gurewitz; Eric Martini – backing vocals
- Beth Oiler – congas
- Donnell Cameron – maracas

Production

- Donnell Cameron – producer
- Chris Brooke; Michael Ewing; Jeff Peccerillo; Eric Martini – engineers
- Tracy Cox – cover art
- Mackie McAller – artwork
- Kathy Bauer – photography

== Album notes ==
- A music video was made for the track "Hyena".
- "Union Blood", the album's fifteenth track, is a hidden track and not mentioned on the back cover.
- "Get Out of My Way", the album's final song, is a cover, originally performed by The Uptones.
- The album insert thanks Lars Frederiksen, who joined the band prior to Rancid's release. As such, out of respect to what they had done before him and so not as to take any credit for it, he does not appear in the liner notes for the album.
- The album thanks Billie Joe Armstrong and his band Green Day. Billie Joe Armstrong would later co-write the song "Radio", which is featured on Rancid's second studio album Let's Go.
- The album also thanks Buzz Osborne and Lori Black of the Melvins.
- The album also thanks The Offspring and NOFX, who were both labelmates with Rancid and would tour and achieve success together.
- Bad Religion members Brett Gurewitz and Jay Bentley make a guest appearance on the album. Brett is the owner of the album's label Epitaph and would produce and engineer their later albums.
- The album thanks Tom Radner, Tony "Blue Shorts" Villis, and Robb Flynn and his band Machine Head as Rob Machinehead. Rancid was also thanked in the booklet of Machine Head's 1994 debut Burn My Eyes.
- The tracks "Adina" and "The Bottle" were featured in the Adam Rifkin film The Chase in 1994.
