= Static Thought =

American punk rock band

Background information
- Origin: California, U.S.
- Genres: Punk rock, hardcore punk
- Years active: 2000–2012
- Labels: Hellcat
- Members: Eric Urbach; Johaan Hill; Aaron Younce; Drew Cueva
- Past members: Charlie Vincent; Mike Leon; Travis Davant; Daniel Garcia

Static Thought was an American punk rock band formed in 2000 in California by Travis Davant, Eric Urbach, and Charlie Vincent. Their last lineup featured Urbach on guitar and vocals, Johaan Hill on bass and vocals, Aaron Younce on guitar and vocals, and Drew Cueva on drums. The band released three studio albums.

== History ==
=== Early years ===
The band was formed by Travis Davant, Eric Urbach, and Charlie Vincent, who were still in middle school at the time. The band wrote and self-released their first EP, Were Dumb, under this lineup. After playing a few shows, Vincent left the band in 2003, and was replaced by Mike Leon. During this period of the band, they released the EP Outta Control. Soon after, Vincent rejoined the band on rhythm guitar in 2005. Soon after his venture back into band, he decided to leave again and was replaced by Daniel Garcia later that year.

=== Signing to Hellcat ===
In 2006, Static Thought signed with Hellcat Records. That summer, they set out on their first tour with Intro5pect (AF Records). Soon after the tour, the band went into the studio and recorded their first full-length, In the Trenches. Soon after, in 2007, Leon left the band and was replaced by Johaan Hill. The band continued to tour across the U.S. and Canada. In 2008, they went into the studio and recorded tracks for a split with Societys Parasites and their next full-length album, The Motive for Movement. They then extensively toured Europe, Canada and the U.S. Afterwards, in 2009, Travis Davant decided to leave the band and was replaced soon after by Drew Cueva.

=== Later activities ===
Heading into the new decade, the band began to work on songs for a new full-length album and did more touring. In the summer of 2010, a split with the band Wartortle was released on Swamp Cabbage Records. Static Thought also headed to the UK for a 10-day tour including a stop at the Reading and Leeds Festivals.

The band quit in 2012.

== Discography ==
=== Albums ===
- 2012: Static Thought
- 2008: The Motive for Movement
- 2007: In the Trenches

=== EPs ===
- 2011: Soylent Green
- 2010: Static Thought / Wartortle 7" split
- 2008: From the Bay to LA
- 2005: Outta Control
- 2004: Were Dumb

=== Compilations ===
- 2006: Track 17 "Victim of Hate" on Give 'Em the Boot V (Hellcat Records)
