= Roots Radicals =

1994 single by Rancid

Single by Rancid

from the album ...And Out Come the Wolves
- Released: August 7, 1995
- Recorded: February–May, 1995 at Fantasy Studios, Berkeley, California; Electric Lady Studios, New York City
- Genre: Punk rock
- Length: 2:47
- Label: Epitaph
- Songwriter: Tim Armstrong / Lars Frederiksen / Matt Freeman
- Producers: Jerry Finn, Rancid

Rancid singles chronology
"Salvation" (1995)	"Roots Radicals" (1995)	"Time Bomb" (1995)

"Roots Radicals" is a song by the American punk rock band Rancid. It was first released as a single in 1994. The song was re-recorded and released as the first single from its third album, ...And Out Come the Wolves. The song reached number 27 on the Billboard Modern Rock Tracks. The b-side, "I Wanna Riot" was originally featured on the Epitaph Records compilation Punk-O-Rama Vol. 1 (1994), and a slightly different and longer version of "I Wanna Riot" with the Stubborn All-Stars was later featured on the Beavis and Butt-head Do America Soundtrack (1996).

== Track listing ==
1. "Roots Radicals" – 2:47
2. "I Wanna Riot" – 3:06

== Song information ==
The song is a tribute to Roots reggae, a subgenre of reggae music known for political radicalism. Specifically, the band is acknowledging that "the roots, the reggae on my stereo" to which the band listened during their teenage years influenced their later work. The title lyric and the line "you know I'm a radical," refer to the Jimmy Cliff song "Roots Radical", which features the chorus, "I'm a radical, I'm a roots radical". One of the repeated verses references Desmond Dekker, one of the most successful roots musicians. The song also draws inspiration from Bunny Wailer's "Roots, Radics, Rockers and Reggae" and Stiff Little Fingers version of that song, "Roots, Radicals, Rockers and Reggae". The "60 bus", which is mentioned in the beginning of the song, refers to a transit route that runs north from downtown Campbell, California along Winchester Boulevard to Santa Clara. The "43 bus," referenced in the song, is the defunct AC Transit 43 line which ran from El Cerrito Plaza, through Albany, Berkeley and Oakland to the Eastmont section of Oakland.

The lines "All the punk rockers/And the moonstompers" references the Symarip track Skinhead Moonstomp, and alludes obliquely to the band's extensive skinhead fanbase.

Another line from "Roots Radicals" provided the name for Give 'Em the Boot, a series of Hellcat Records compilations albums.
