= ...And Out Come the Wolves =

1995 studio album by Rancid

Studio album by Rancid
- Released: August 22, 1995
- Recorded: February–May 1995
- Studios: Fantasy (Berkeley, California); Electric Lady (New York City)
- Genres: Punk rock; ska punk
- Length: 49:39
- Label: Epitaph
- Producers: Jerry Finn, Rancid

Rancid chronology
Let's Go (1994)	...And Out Come the Wolves (1995)	Life Won't Wait (1998)

Singles from ...And Out Come the Wolves
- 1. "Roots Radicals" Released: August 7, 1995; 2. "Time Bomb" Released: November 1, 1995; 3. "Ruby Soho" Released: November 3, 1995

...And Out Come the Wolves is the third studio album by American punk rock band Rancid. It was released on August 22, 1995, through Epitaph Records. Rancid's popularity and catchy songs made them the subject of a major label bidding war (hence the title, ...And Out Come the Wolves taken from a poem in Jim Carroll's The Basketball Diaries) that ended with the band staying on Epitaph. With a sound heavily influenced by ska, which called to mind Tim Armstrong and Matt Freeman's past in Operation Ivy, Rancid became one of the few bands of the mid-to-late 1990s punk rock boom to retain much of its original fan base. In terms of record sales and certifications, ...And Out Come the Wolves is a popular album in the United States. It produced three singles: "Roots Radicals", "Time Bomb" and "Ruby Soho", that earned Rancid its heaviest airplay on MTV and radio stations to date. All the singles charted on Modern Rock Tracks. ...And Out Come the Wolves was certified gold by the RIAA on January 22, 1996. It was certified platinum on September 23, 2004.

Along with Bad Religion's Stranger than Fiction, Green Day's Dookie and the Offspring's Smash, ...And Out Come the Wolves helped revive mainstream interest in punk rock in the mid-1990s, signaled the initial rise of mainstream punk rock, and proved to be successful for the band. To coincide with its 20th anniversary, Rancid performed the album live in its entirety on their 2015–2016 Honor Is All We Know world tour.

== Background ==
Rancid formed in Albany, California, in 1991. They signed to Epitaph Records (founded by Bad Religion guitarist Brett Gurewitz) in 1992 and released their eponymous debut album, Rancid, a year later to rave reviews. While Rancid was already writing another album, Green Day's Billie Joe Armstrong, one of the band's friends, joined them to co-write the song "Radio". This led to him playing a live show with the band, and Rancid frontman Tim Armstrong eventually asked him to become a member of the band, but he decided to continue playing in Green Day. Armstrong had previously asked Lars Frederiksen to be Rancid's second guitarist, but he turned down the request. After Billie Joe declined, Frederiksen changed his mind and decided to join the band. Rancid's second album, Let's Go, was released in 1994 to unexpected success and acclaim. After the release of Green Day's Dookie and The Offspring's Smash later that year, Rancid was pursued by several major labels, including Madonna's Maverick Records, but eventually turned them down. They decided to stay on Epitaph and soon began recording a follow-up album.

Armstrong later commented on why they stayed with Epitaph stating:

Ultimately, we decided it would dumb not to stay with [Epitaph owner and president] Brett Gurewitz, a real record guy, a punk rock record guy. Madonna’s cool, but she’s an international superstar. She’s not a punk rock record guy. That’s what we needed.

== Recording and production ==
...And Out Come the Wolves was recorded mainly between February and May 1995. The recording took place at not only Fantasy Studios in Berkeley, California (where Let's Go was recorded), but also at the famous Electric Lady Studios (built by Jimi Hendrix) in New York City. This was the first time Rancid recorded an album at more than one studio. While the entire recording processed was intended to be helmed by Jerry Finn, scheduling conflicts occurred and Brett Gurewitz ended up having to return in order to record and arrange the vocals at Electric Lady Studios. The album was mixed by Andy Wallace, who had previously worked on Nirvana's Nevermind and Rage Against The Machine's self-titled debut.

The album saw Rancid go all in with the ska influences, with New Noise Magazine comparing it to Tim Armstrong and Matt Freeman’s previous band Operation Ivy. The song "Journey to The End of the East Bay," details the highs and lows of Operation Ivy.

== Artwork ==
The cover art features guitarist Lars Frederiksen with his head on his knees sitting on steps. The red Rancid logo is the same that they have consistently used since the release of their second album Let’s Go. The album cover was photographed and designed by Jesse Fischer. It is a tribute to Minor Threat, a landmark hardcore punk band, that originally used the image of Alec MacKaye (brother of the band's lead singer Ian MacKaye) with his head on his knees on steps of the Wilson Center steps on their eponymous debut EP.

== Release and promotion ==
There were three single released for the album the first being "Roots Radicals" which was released as a promotional single on August 7, 1995, and was accompanied with an official music video. "Roots Radicals" went on to get radio play and peaked at number 27 on the Billboard Modern Rock Tracks. However it was the second single "Time Bomb" which went on to become the album’s biggest hit reaching the top 10 on the Billboard Modern Rock Tracks peaking at number 8. The song also gained prominence internationally, reaching the mainstream singles charts in Australia peaking at number 76, Scotland peaking at 67 and peaking the highest in the UK at number 57. Just the like the album’s previous singles the final single "Ruby Soho" also seen radio success reaching number 13 on the US Modern Rock Tracks and peaking at number 64 on the Australian singles chart. All three of these singles and their music videos went on to receive heavy playtime on MTV.

...And Out Come the Wolves was officially released on August 22, 1995, and peaked at number 45 on the Billboard 200 album chart. The albums also reached the mainstream charts in several other countries peaking the highest in both Finland and Australia where it reached number 30. Five months after its release, the album was certified gold and in 2004 it was certified platinum. The album was the second punk rock record to sell over a million copies on an independent label with the first being The Offspring's Smash. The album has also gone on to achieve gold status in Australia, Canada Japan, and the UK. With the album’s popularity Rancid went on to perform as a mainstage act on that years Lollapalooza tour. The band also went on an extensive tour in support of the album, the European leg of the tour went from September 6, 1995, to October 1. The US leg of the tour began on October 14, and went all the way till December 31. They also played one show in Sydney, Australia on December 31. Rancid also played "Roots Radicals" and "Ruby Soho." on Saturday Night Live on November 18, 1995.

In celebration of the albums 20th anniversary in 2015, Rancid released a special reissue of the album featuring the bonus tracks "Blast ‘Em" and "That’s Entertainment."

== Reception and legacy ==
Professional ratings
Review scores
Source	Rating
AllMusic	4.5/5 stars
The Des Moines Register	4/5 stars
Entertainment Weekly	A+
Los Angeles Times	3/4 stars
NME	7/10
The Philadelphia Inquirer	3.5/4 stars
Q	3/5 stars
The Rolling Stone Album Guide	4/5 stars
Select	3/5
The Village Voice	A−

The album received positive reviews, Stephen Thomas Erlewine of AllMusic described the album as having "classic moments of revivalist punk". Erlewine praised the music and claims the album "doesn't mark an isolationist retreat into didactic, defiantly underground punk rock". The album received a rating of four and a half out of five stars, while "Time Bomb," "Ruby Soho" and "Roots Radicals" earned Rancid its heaviest airplay on MTV and radio stations to date. A reviewer from Ultimate Guitar gave the album a 9.7/10 stating "This album of course relates to other Rancid records, but it is a little bit superior in the ska department then their other albums (except Life Won't Wait). SOME stand-outs (because every song is great on this album), would be:Maxwell Murder: A true punk anthem, and the BEST opening track on ANY album ever. Plus it has an amazing bass solo. Roots Radicals: A truly wonderful song." Steve Holchman of The Los Angeles Times claimed "This lacks the big-picture perspective and cultural urgency of “London Calling”; Berkeley in ’95 isn’t the powder-keg of Brixton in ’79. But Rancid still brings a compelling sense of purpose to its songs. Rather than social calls to arms, these are individual ones. “Do you know where the power lies? / It starts and ends with you,” Tim Armstrong tells a troubled little sister in "11th Hour."

In a retrospective review by Ricky Frankel of PunkNews he wrote "…And Out Come The Wolves was a monumental punk rock release. Perhaps even legendary. For those non-punk rock musicians who claim that "punk musicians can't play their instruments," this album alone defied any notion of the sort. Tim, Lars, Matt, and Brett were clearly masters of their instruments during the recording of this album and still are to this day. It's not only that every track on this album was great, which alone makes it a perfect (or damn-well near perfect), but this album's influence and Rancid's influence in general will be felt for many future generations of punk rockers."

In 2005, ...And Out Come the Wolves was ranked number 368 in Rock Hard magazine's book The 500 Greatest Rock & Metal Albums of All Time. BuzzFeed included the album at number 14 on their "36 Pop Punk Albums You Need To Hear Before You F——ing Die" list. Cleveland.com ranked "Ruby Soho" at number 21 on their list of the top 100 pop-punk songs. ...And Out Come the Wolves became a cultural phenomenon and truly helped catapulted punk into the mainstream. The album has been listed as an essential punk album, with Radial Magazine stating "it made Rancid one of the leading acts in the punk scene and cemented the band’s place in music history."

In 2015 Loudwire put the album at number 16 on their list of the top 25 best punk albums of all time. In 2016 the readers of Rolling Stone voted it the 9th best punk album of all time, In 2018 Revolver named it the 8th greatest punk album of all time. that same year Metal Hammer dubbed the album the 13th greatest punk album of all time. In 2021 Kerrang! named the album to their list of the 40th greatest punk albums made since Never Mind the Bollocks. In 2026, Rolling Stone ranked it the 51st greatest punk album of all time.

On May 21, 2021, it was announced that Lavasock Records is releasing a tribute album titled ...And Out Come the Lawsuits featuring Link 80, Sarchasm, Omnigone, Flying Raccoon Suit, Little Debbie & The Crusaders and Stay Wild.

Professional wrestler Dori Prange came up with her in-ring name, Ruby Riott, from the song "Ruby Soho". Prange lost the rights to the name after her release from the WWE in June 2021 however thanks to Lars Frederiksen, who hosts a wrestling podcast, she now wrestles under the name of Ruby Soho. During a retrospective review of the album in 2025 by Grammys.com they dubbed the album "A Definitive Punk Portrait."

The album has directly inspired the upcoming film And Out Comes the Wolf.

== Track listing ==
All tracks are written by Tim Armstrong, Matt Freeman and Lars Frederiksen, except where noted.

No.	Title	Lead vocals	Length
1.	"Maxwell Murder"	Frederiksen, Armstrong	1:25
2.	"The 11th Hour" (written by Armstrong, Freeman, Frederiksen, Eric Dinn)	Armstrong	2:28
3.	"Roots Radicals"	Frederiksen, Armstrong	2:47
4.	"Time Bomb"	Armstrong	2:24
5.	"Olympia WA."	Armstrong	3:30
6.	"Lock, Step & Gone"	Frederiksen, Armstrong	2:25
7.	"Junkie Man" (written by Armstrong, Freeman, Frederiksen, Jim Carroll)	Armstrong, Frederiksen	3:04
8.	"Listed M.I.A."	Frederiksen	2:22
9.	"Ruby Soho"	Armstrong	2:37
10.	"Daly City Train"	Armstrong	3:21
11.	"Journey to the End of the East Bay"	Armstrong	3:11
12.	"She's Automatic"	Frederiksen	1:35
13.	"Old Friend"	Armstrong	2:53
14.	"Disorder and Disarray"	Armstrong, Frederiksen	2:49
15.	"The Wars End"	Frederiksen	1:53
16.	"You Don't Care Nothin'"	Frederiksen, Armstrong	2:28
17.	"As Wicked"	Armstrong, Frederiksen	2:40
18.	"Avenues & Alleyways"	Armstrong, Frederiksen	3:11
19.	"The Way I Feel"	Frederiksen, Armstrong	2:34
Total length:			49:39

2015 remaster CD bonus tracks
No.	Title	Lead vocals	Length
20.	"Blast 'Em"	Armstrong	2:29
21.	"That's Entertainment"	Frederiksen	1:31
Total length:			53:39

== Personnel ==
Personnel taken from ...And Out Come the Wolves liner notes.

Rancid

- Tim Armstrong – vocals, guitar
- Lars Frederiksen – vocals, guitar
- Matt Freeman – bass, backing vocals
- Brett Reed – drums

Additional musicians

- Bashiri Johnson – percussion
- Paul Jackson – Hammond organ
- DJ Disk – scratching on "Junkie Man"
- Jim Carroll – vocals on "Junkie Man"
- Eric Dinn – drums

Artwork

- Lars Frederiksen – cover art, cover photo
- Jesse Fischer – photography, artwork, layout

Production

- Jerry Finn – production, mixing on "Ruby Soho"
- Rancid – production
- Andy Wallace – mixing (all except "Ruby Soho")
- Michael Rosen – engineer
- Brett Gurewitz – additional recording
- Howie Weinberg – mastering
- Joe Pirrera – assistant engineer (Electric Lady)
- Frank Rinella – assistant engineer
- Steve Sisco – assistant engineer (Soundtracks)
- Mike Fasano – drum technician

== Charts ==
Chart performance for ...And Out Come the Wolves
Chart (1995)	Peak position
Australian Albums (ARIA)	30
Dutch Albums (Album Top 100)	89
Finnish Albums (Suomen virallinen lista)	30
Swedish Albums (Sverigetopplistan)	39
UK Albums (Official Charts)	55
US Billboard 200	45

2016 chart performance for ...And Out Come the Wolves
Chart (2016)	Peak position
German Albums (Offizielle Top 100)	74

== Certifications ==
Region	Certification	Certified units/sales
Australia (ARIA)	Gold	35,000^{^}
Canada (Music Canada)	Gold	50,000^{^}
United Kingdom (BPI)	Gold	100,000^{‡}
Japan (RIAJ)	Gold	100,000^{^}
United States (RIAA)	Platinum	1,000,000^{^}
^{^} Shipments figures based on certification alone.^{‡} Sales+streaming figures based on certification alone.
