= List of songs in Guitar Hero =

Guitar Hero is a music video game for the Sony PlayStation 2 developed by Harmonix and released in 2005. Guitar Hero's gameplay features the use of a special guitar-shaped controller modeled after a Gibson SG guitar to recreate the lead guitar part of several rock music songs; the player scores in the game by both pressing one or more fret buttons on the controller and using a strum bar in time with notes as they appear on screen. The game features a total of 47 songs.

== Main set list ==
There are thirty songs within the solo "Career" mode. The songs are grouped by difficulty into named tiers. Furthermore, four overall difficulty levels — Easy, Medium, Hard, and Expert — are present in the game, reflecting the number of frets that are employed, the number of notes to be played, and the speed at which the notes scroll on the screen. Tiers are presented sequentially within each difficulty level; in lower difficulty modes, only 3 or 4 songs of each tier must be completed before the next tier is made available for that difficulty level, while in the higher difficulties, all five songs must be completed. Once a tier is opened at any difficulty level, the songs in that tier are playable in quick play or competitive modes. However, in the easiest difficulty, you only play five tiers, and cannot unlock bonus songs.

All songs are covers of the original versions, credited as, for example, "'Iron Man' as made famous by Black Sabbath", and were performed by Wave Group Sound for the game. Wave Group has released a selection of these covers through paid download services like iTunes in a collection entitled "The Guitar Hero Recordings".

Year	Song title	Artist	Tier
1980	"Ace of Spades"	Motörhead	5. Fret-Burners
1983	"Bark at the Moon"	Ozzy Osbourne	6. Face Melters
2002	"Cochise"	Audioslave	4. Return of the Shred
1990	"Cowboys from Hell"	Pantera	6. Face Melters
1968	"Crossroads"	Cream	5. Fret-Burners
2001	"Fat Lip"	Sum 41	4. Return of the Shred
1972	"Frankenstein"	The Edgar Winter Group	6. Face Melters
1977	"Godzilla"	Blue Öyster Cult	6. Face Melters
2004	"Heart Full of Black"	Burning Brides	3. Thrash and Burn
2004	"Hey You"	The Exies	3. Thrash and Burn
1989	"Higher Ground"	Red Hot Chili Peppers	5. Fret-Burners
1982	"I Love Rock 'n Roll"	Joan Jett & the Blackhearts	1. Opening Licks
1978	"I Wanna Be Sedated"	Ramones	1. Opening Licks
1994	"Infected"	Bad Religion	1. Opening Licks
1970	"Iron Man"	Black Sabbath	2. Axe-Grinders
1974	"Killer Queen"	Queen	3. Thrash and Burn
1976	"More Than a Feeling"	Boston	2. Axe-Grinders
2002	"No One Knows"	Queens of the Stone Age	5. Fret-Burners
1983	"Sharp Dressed Man"	ZZ Top	2. Axe-Grinders
1972	"Smoke on the Water"	Deep Purple	1. Opening Licks
1967	"Spanish Castle Magic" (instrumental)	The Jimi Hendrix Experience	5. Fret-Burners
1999	"Stellar"	Incubus	3. Thrash and Burn
1992	"Symphony of Destruction"	Megadeth	3. Thrash and Burn
2002	"Take it Off"	The Donnas	4. Return of the Shred
2004	"Take Me Out"	Franz Ferdinand	2. Axe-Grinders
1983	"Texas Flood"	Stevie Ray Vaughan	6. Face Melters
1992	"Thunder Kiss '65"	White Zombie	1. Opening Licks
1992	"Unsung"	Helmet	4. Return of the Shred
1982	"You've Got Another Thing Comin'"	Judas Priest	2. Axe-Grinders
1972	"Ziggy Stardust"	David Bowie	4. Return of the Shred

== Bonus songs ==
Seventeen bonus songs are available within Guitar Hero. Bonus songs can be purchased with in-game money earned from the Career mode within the game's virtual store. Once purchased, the songs will be playable at all difficulty levels in Career, quickplay, and competitive modes. Many of the bands featured in the bonus songs are those that Harmonix members participate in. The song "Cheat on the Church" by Graveyard BBQ was selected for inclusion in the game as the winner of the "Be a Guitar Hero" contest.

All of the bonus songs are the original master tracks.

Year	Song title	Artist
2005	"All of This"	Shaimus
2005	"Behind the Mask"	Anarchy Club
2005	"The Breaking Wheel"	Artillery (Note: The group Artillery has since changed their name to Breaking Wheel, after their song, due to the Danish thrash metal band of the same name.)
2005	"Callout"	The Acro-Brats
2005	"Cavemen Rejoice"	The Bags
2005	"Cheat on the Church"	Graveyard BBQ
2005	"Decontrol"	Drist
2000	"Eureka, I've Found Love"	The Upper Crust
2005	"Even Rats"	The Slip
2005	"Farewell Myth"	Made in Mexico
2005	"Fire it Up"	Black Label Society
2005	"Fly on the Wall"	Din
2000	"Get Ready 2 Rokk"	Freezepop
2005	"Guitar Hero"	Monkey Steals the Peach
2004	"Hey"	Honest Bob and the Factory-to-Dealer Incentives
2005	"Sail Your Ship By"	Count Zero
2005	"Story of My Love"	The Model Sons

== Other songs ==
Two other songs are present on the game media, but they can only be unlocked through the use of a PlayStation 2 cheat device, such as GameShark, Code Breaker or Action Replay.

- "Graveyard Shift" - by Gurney (An unknown artist, possibly from within Harmonix however most current and former employees claim they knew nothing about the song.)
- "Trippolette" - by Andi Buch (credited as Andrew Buch), a composer at Berklee College of Music who has worked on the Harmonix team.

"Trippolette" was also downloadable at the Rock Band Network music store.
