= Time Bomb (Rancid song) =

1995 single by Rancid

Single by Rancid

from the album ...And Out Come the Wolves
- Released: November 1, 1995
- Recorded: February–May 1995
- Genre: Ska punk; reggae rock; reggae punk
- Length: 2:24
- Label: Epitaph
- Songwriter: Tim Armstrong / Lars Frederiksen / Matt Freeman
- Producers: Jerry Finn, Rancid

Rancid singles chronology
"Roots Radicals" (1995)	"Time Bomb" (1995)	"Ruby Soho" (1995)

"Time Bomb" is a song by the American punk rock band Rancid. It was released as the second single from their third album, ...And Out Come the Wolves. The song reached number 8 on Billboard Modern Rock Tracks, marking the highest initial charting single in Rancid's career.

== Composition ==
"Time Bomb" is a ska punk ska, ska rock and reggae rock song, similar to the sound of Operation Ivy, in which Tim Armstrong and Matt Freeman used to play before Rancid. The lyrics for the first verse of the song were sampled from an earlier song, "Motorcycle Ride", which appeared on the band's previous album, Let's Go.

This song is about Eric Hogan (a good friend of the band, particularly Tim Armstrong) who used to own American Graffiti Tattoo. He was murdered by Hells Angels (supposedly) for sleeping with a gang member's wife.

== Music video ==
The music video for the song was directed by Marcus Raboy. It was partially filmed at 155 Rivington in New York City's Lower East Side; the building later became the headquarters of Kickstarter.

== Reception ==
Reception to the song was widely positive. Loudersound ranked Time Bomb as Rancid's second best song. Consequence ranked the song as the band's 5th best song, and the 44th best punk song of all time. Diffuser listed it as their 10th best song. In the UK, it entered the charts in the week ending on October 7th, 1995, peaking at #56. Pitchfork stated that the song had a big impact in introducing many to the 2-Tone aesthetic and culture.

== Track listing ==
1. "Time Bomb" - 2:24
2. "The Wars End" - 1:53
3. "Blast 'Em" - 2:29

== In popular culture ==
- Time Bomb was featured in the 2000 Gilmore Girls episode Cinnamon's Wake. Lane's band also performed a cover of "Time Bomb" in the Season 4 Gilmore Girls episode "Afterboom".
- It was used in the 2005 movie Fun with Dick and Jane.
- It was used in the 2016 movie Punk's Dead: SLC Punk 2.
- It was used in the 2018 Netflix show Everything Sucks!.
- It was used in the 2018 movie Peter Rabbit.
- Along with "Ruby Soho" and "Last One to Die", "Time Bomb" was released in the Rancid 01 track pack on July 21, 2009, for Rock Band 2.
- UFC fighter Antonio Banuelos uses the song as he makes his entrance to the Octagon.

== Charts ==
Chart (1995–1996)	Peak position
Australia (ARIA)	76
Canada RPM Top Singles	7
UK (Official Charts Company)	56
U.S. Modern Rock Tracks (Billboard)	8
U.S. Hot 100 Airplay (Billboard)	48
