= Rancid (band) =

American punk rock band

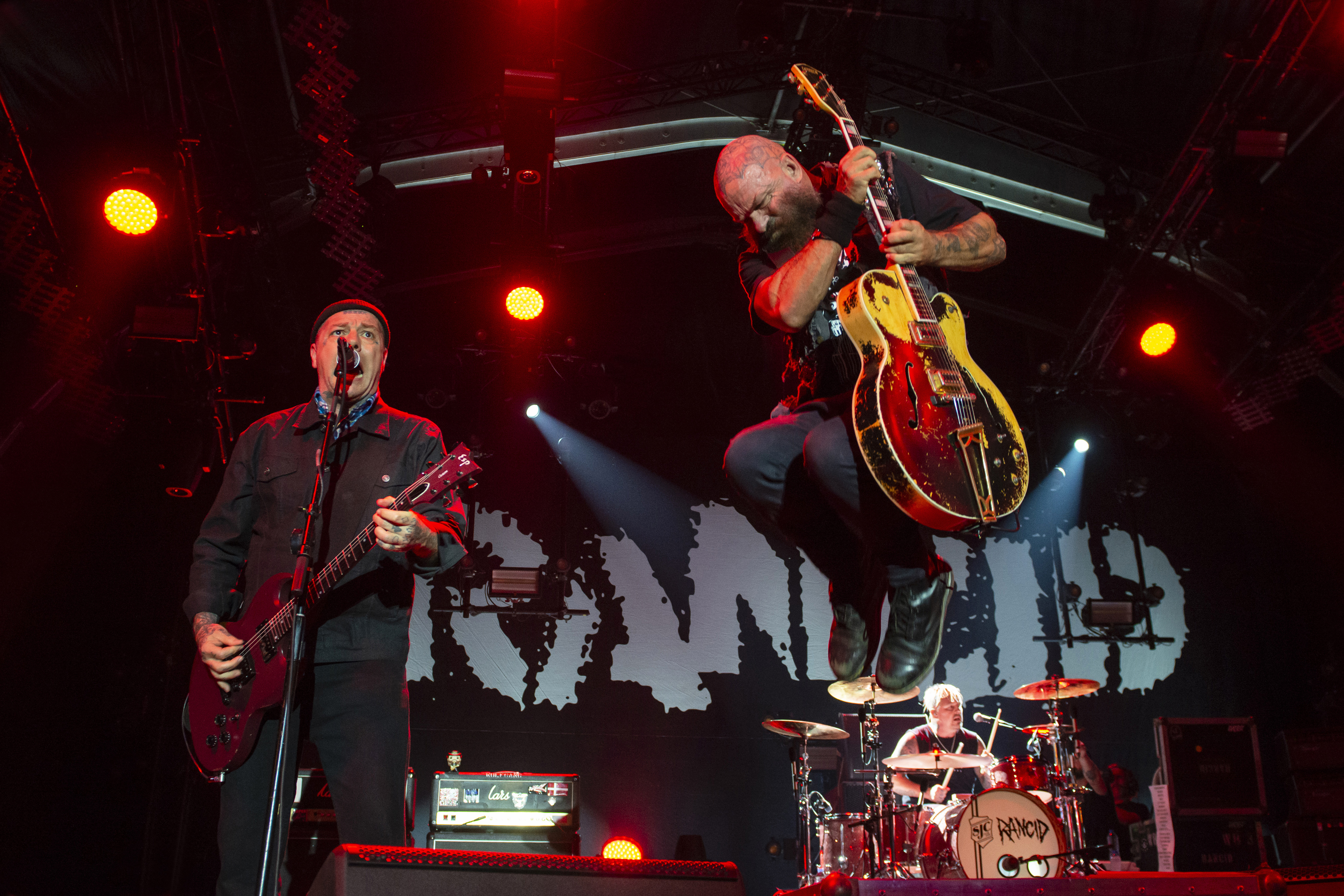
- Rancid in 2023

Background information
- Origin: Berkeley, California, U.S.
- Genres: Punk rock; ska punk; street punk
- Works: Discography
- Years active: 1991–present
- Labels: Hellcat; Epitaph; Fat Wreck Chords; Lookout!; Pirates Press; Warner Bros.
- Spinoffs: Transplants; Lars Frederiksen and the Bastards; Tim Timebomb; Devils Brigade; Shaken 69
- Spinoff of: Operation Ivy; Downfall
- Members: Tim Armstrong; Matt Freeman; Lars Frederiksen; Branden Steineckert
- Past members: Brett Reed
- Website: rancidrancid.com

Rancid is an American punk rock band formed in Berkeley, California, in 1991. Founded by Tim Armstrong and Matt Freeman, former members of the band Operation Ivy, Rancid is often credited (alongside Green Day and the Offspring) as being among the wave of bands that revived mainstream interest in punk rock in the United States during the mid-1990s. Over its 35-year career, Rancid has retained much of its original fan base, most of which was connected to its underground musical roots.

Rancid has had two lineup changes since its inception, with Tim Armstrong and Matt Freeman being continuous members. Their current lineup consists of Armstrong on guitar and vocals, Freeman on bass and vocals, Lars Frederiksen on guitar and vocals, and Branden Steineckert on drums. The band was formed by Armstrong, Freeman, and former drummer Brett Reed, who left the band in 2006 and was replaced by Steineckert. This lineup recorded their first album, with Frederiksen joining the band on their subsequent tour.

To date, Rancid has released ten studio albums, one split album, one compilation, two extended plays, and a series of live online-only albums, and has been featured on a number of compilation albums. The band has sold over four million records worldwide, making it one of the most successful punk rock groups of all time. The band rose to popularity in 1994 with its second studio album, Let's Go, featuring the single "Salvation". In the following year, Rancid released its highly successful album ...And Out Come the Wolves, which produced its best-known songs "Roots Radicals", "Ruby Soho", and "Time Bomb", and was certified gold and platinum by the RIAA, selling over one million copies in the United States alone. Its next six albums – Life Won't Wait (1998), Rancid (2000), Indestructible (2003), Let the Dominoes Fall (2009), ...Honor Is All We Know (2014) and Trouble Maker (2017) – were also critically acclaimed, though not as commercially successful as ...And Out Come the Wolves. The band released their tenth album, Tomorrow Never Comes, in 2023.

== History ==
=== Background and early history (1987–1993) ===
Childhood friends Tim Armstrong and Matt Freeman grew up together in Albany, California, a small, then–working-class community near Berkeley. The two had been playing together in the influential ska punk band Operation Ivy from 1987 to 1989. The band became popular in the punk scene at 924 Gilman Street, a club and concert venue featuring Bay Area punk bands. When Operation Ivy broke up, Armstrong and Freeman decided to form a new band, and formed a ska punk band called Downfall, which disbanded after a few months. They then started a hardcore punk band called Generator, which also disbanded shortly after. They also started the ska influenced Dance Hall Crashers, though they left the band shortly after it was formed. During this time, Armstrong was struggling with alcoholism, and to keep him focused on other interests, Freeman suggested they form a new band. In 1991, they recruited Armstrong's roommate Brett Reed as their drummer and formed Rancid.

A few months after the band's inception, Rancid began performing around the Berkeley area, and quickly developed a fan following. Rancid's first recorded release was a 1992 EP for Operation Ivy's old label Lookout! Records. Shortly after releasing the extended play, the band left Lookout! and was signed to Bad Religion guitarist Brett Gurewitz's record label, Epitaph Records. Rancid released its self-titled debut album through Epitaph in 1993.

=== Breakthrough success (1994–1996) ===
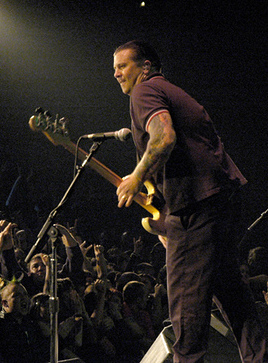
Matt Freeman

While Rancid was writing for a follow-up album, Billie Joe Armstrong joined them to co-write the song "Radio", which resulted in Armstrong playing a live performance with Rancid. Tim had previously asked Lars Frederiksen to be Rancid's second guitarist, but he turned down the request initially as he was playing with the UK Subs at the time. After Billie Joe turned down the request, Frederiksen changed his mind and joined Rancid.

Frederiksen played with the band on its second studio album Let's Go (1994). That year, its then-label-mates, the Offspring, experienced huge success with its album Smash. Rancid supported the Offspring's 1994 tour, which helped Let's Go reach number 97 on Billboard's Heatseekers and the Billboard 200 charts, respectively. The album also provided its first widespread exposure when MTV broadcast the video for the single "Salvation". Let's Go was certified gold on July 7, 2000, and with the success of the album, the band was pursued by a number of major record labels, including Madonna's label Maverick Records. Many rumors circulated during this time period. Some of the rumors were Epitaph employees were not allowed to discuss matters with the press, Rancid convinced an A&R man from Epic to shave a blue mohawk, and Madonna sent the band nude pictures of herself.

The band eventually decided to remain signed to Epitaph, and the next year released its third album ...And Out Come the Wolves on August 22, 1995. Armstrong later commented on why they stayed with Epitaph stating:

Ultimately, we decided it would dumb not to stay with [Epitaph owner and president] Brett Gurewitz, a real record guy, a punk rock record guy. Madonna's cool, but she's an international superstar. She's not a punk rock record guy. That's what we needed.

The album quickly surpassed Let's Go in terms of success, and reached number 45 on the Billboard 200 album chart. on January 22, 1996, the album was certified gold. and in 2004 it was certified platinum. The album received positive reviews, Stephen Thomas Erlewine of AllMusic described the album as having "classic moments of revivalist punk". Erlewine praised the music and claims the album "doesn't mark an isolationist retreat into didactic, defiantly underground punk rock". Three of the album's singles, "Roots Radicals", "Time Bomb", and "Ruby Soho" all charted on the Billboard Modern Rock Tracks, and earned Rancid its heaviest airplay on MTV and radio stations to date. The band also performed "Roots Radicals" and "Ruby Soho" on Saturday Night Live. They also performed as a mainstage act on that years Lollapalooza tour and went on an extensive tour in support of the album, the European leg of the tour went from September 6, 1995, to October 1. The US leg of the tour began on October 14, and went all the way till December 31. To begin 1996 Rancid embarked on their first tour of Australia, they also continued to tour in the US, Europe and Japan.

=== Middle years (1997–2003) ===
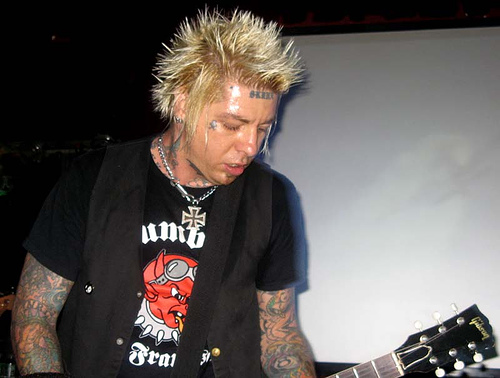
Lars Frederiksen

After two years of touring for ...And Out Come the Wolves, Rancid returned to the studio in 1997 to begin recording its fourth studio album, Life Won't Wait, which was released on June 30, 1998. The album branched out from Rancid's previous musical styles, and combined punk rock with elements of roots reggae, rockabilly, dub, hip-hop, and funk, drawing comparisons to the Clash's Sandinista!. Though the album did not achieve the success of ...And Out Come the Wolves, it has since garnered a strong cult following in recent times. During the summer of that year they took part in the Warped Tour 1998, and toured most the year in the US. In 1999, Rancid decided to end its seven-year relationship with Epitaph and signed with Armstrong's founded Hellcat Records (which is a sub-label of Epitaph).

A second self-titled album was released on August 1, 2000 and would be its first album released through Hellcat. The album failed to achieve the success of Rancid's previous three albums and reached number 68 on the Billboard charts. On the album, the group largely abandoned its ska-punk influences, recording a more hardcore-influenced album. The next year the band took part in the Vans Warped 2001 tour.

The three original members of Rancid released three songs under the name Devil's Brigade in 2002, one on the Give 'Em the Boot III compilation album, and two on a 12-inch vinyl record. In March of the same year, a split album with NOFX titled BYO Split Series Volume III was released, in which Rancid covered NOFX songs and NOFX covered Rancid songs.

After a break from touring in 2001, Rancid returned to the studio with Gurewitz in 2002 to record its sixth studio album, Indestructible, which was released on August 19, 2003 and was their highest-charting album to date, reaching number 15, selling 51,000 copies in its first week. Unlike the band's previous albums, Indestructible was distributed by not only Epitaph/Hellcat but major record label, Warner Bros. Records, a move that received some backlash from the band's fans who questioned their loyalty to the independent scene. When released, the album didn't feature the Warner logo anywhere on the packaging, a move to hide the major label move from fans.

The album was warmly received by most critics however met with mixed reviews from fans, some of which felt the album contained a "poppier" sound (some accusing Warner of having an influence on the music) while others felt it was a mixture of ..And Out Come the Wolves and Life Won't Wait. The album's music video for the first single, "Fall Back Down" was also met with some criticism from fans due to members of Good Charlotte and Kelly Osbourne making appearances.

=== Hiatus (2004–2005) ===
In 2004, after a tour for Indestructible, Rancid went on an extended hiatus. The band members worked with side projects, although it had not officially disbanded. Armstrong continued to play with his side project the Transplants, who released their second album, Haunted Cities, in 2005. He also contributed guitar and backing vocals on Cypress Hill's song "What's Your Number?" from its tenth album Till Death Do Us Part. Armstrong also released a solo album, A Poet's Life in May 2007. Frederiksen continued working with his side-project Lars Frederiksen and the Bastards and released their second studio album, Viking, in 2004, the album was co-written and co-produced by Armstrong. Freeman briefly toured with Social Distortion in 2004 as John Maurer's replacement until the band found its current bassist Brent Harding. Freeman and Frederiksen both had children during this time as well—Freeman had two, and Frederiksen had one.

=== Reformation and Let the Dominoes Fall (2006–2010) ===
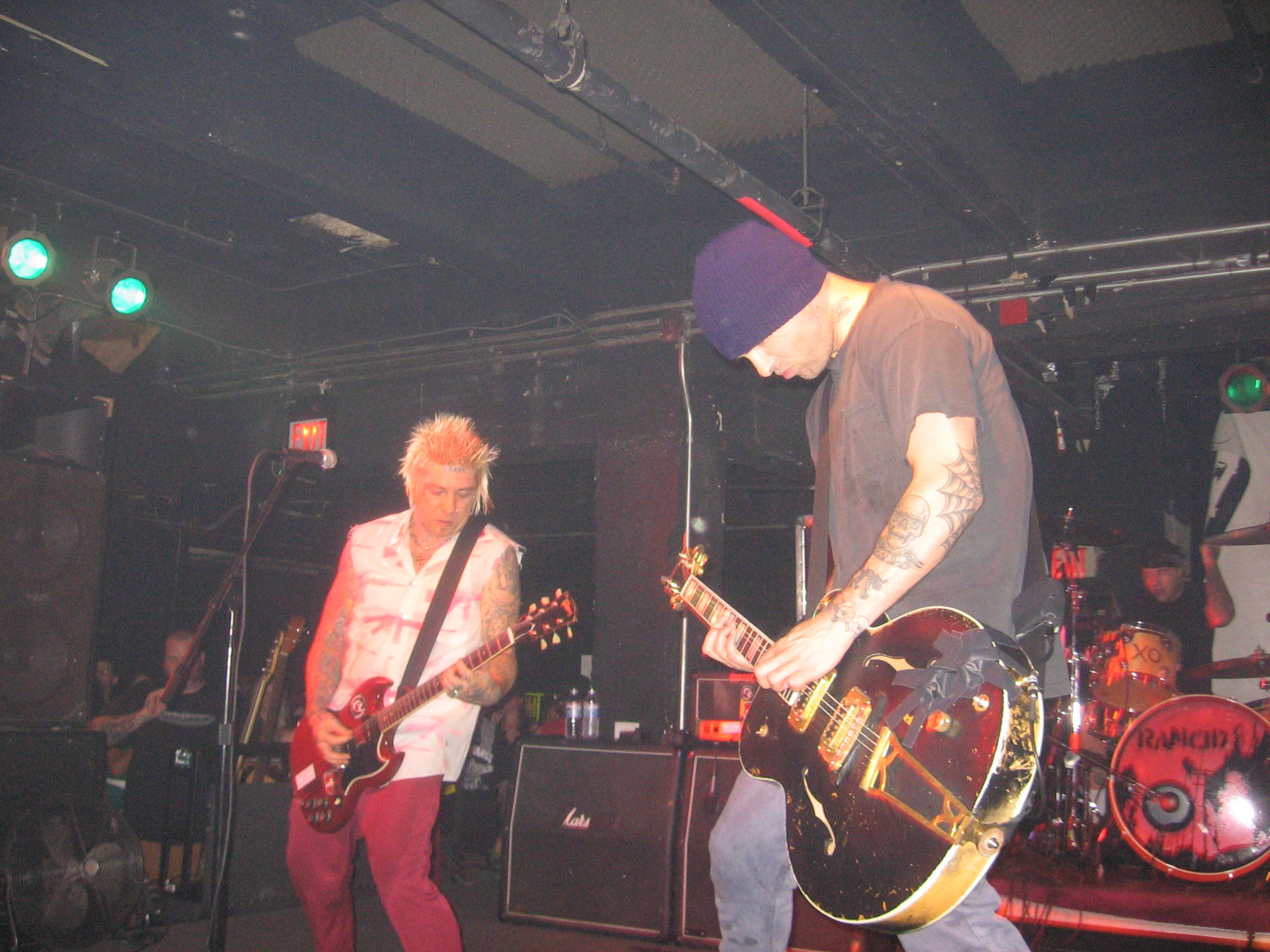
Rancid performing in 2006

In early 2006, Rancid reformed to embark on a successful tour and played a number of acoustic performances as part of Hellcat Records' Hellcat Nights concert series at the Echo. It was the band's first live performance since its hiatus. On April 13, 2006, Rancid announced plans for a worldwide tour beginning in July 2006, and the release of a DVD consisting of 31 of its music videos, as well as a tentative release date of spring 2007 for a new as-yet-unnamed studio album.

Similar to a number of other bands signed to Lookout! Records, in September 2006, Rancid had taken its self-titled extended play from the label's catalog. On November 3, 2006, Reed left Rancid and was replaced by Branden Steineckert, formerly a member of the Used.

Rancid released a compilation album, B Sides and C Sides, on December 11, 2007. The album consists of various b-sides, "c-sides", and songs from other compilations.

Rancid toured Japan in April 2008 for a number of shows following its two days headlining the Punkspring 2008 festival. Following the Japanese tour, Rancid embarked on a full tour of the United States during the summer and a tour of the United Kingdom in the winter.

Rancid used to host a one-hour once a week XM radio show. The show was called Rancid Radio and was on "Fungus" channel 53 Saturday at midnight. However, the show was canceled due to Fungus 53 being taken from XM's programming.

Although plans for a follow-up to Indestructible had been mentioned in 2005, 2006 and 2007, it would not materialize until January 2008, when Rancid entered Skywalker Sound to record it. The resulting seventh studio album, Let the Dominoes Fall, was released on June 2, 2009. In late May, the full album was streamed from the band's MySpace page. It was Rancid's first album without its "classic" lineup, with Branden Steineckert replacing Brett Reed on drums in 2006. The album was written at Branden's Unknown Studios in Utah and was recorded at Skywalker Sound in Nicasio, California. Music legend Booker T. Jones performed organ on one song. A deluxe version of the album included the CD, some of the songs recorded acoustically on another CD, and a making of the album DVD. Let the Dominoes Fall became the band's most successful album on the Billboard 200, peaking at number 11 and selling 33,000 copies in its first week. Rancid toured North America in the summer of 2009 in support of Let the Dominoes Fall, with Rise Against, Riverboat Gamblers, and Billy Talent as its opening bands. The tour began on June 4, 2009 in Vancouver, British Columbia and ended in Toronto, Ontario on July 31.

On June 10, 2009, the band appeared as the musical guest on The Tonight Show with Conan O'Brien playing "Last One to Die" from Let the Dominoes Fall.

=== ...Honor Is All We Know (2011–2016) ===
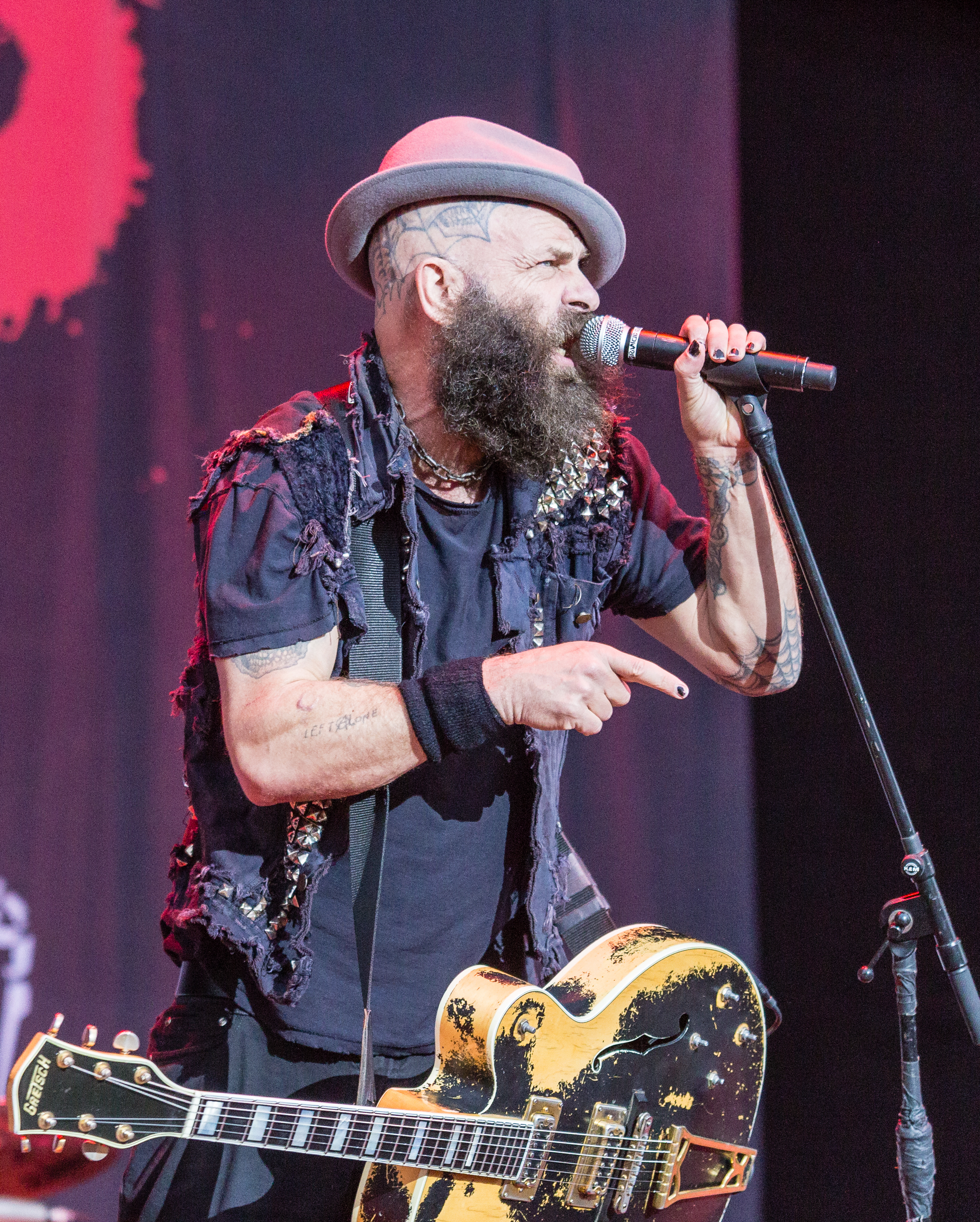
Tim Armstrong

Rancid did a small US tour supporting Blink-182 from August 25 through September 4, 2011, to enable them to warm up before entering the studio in September 2011 to record their eighth album with Brett Gurewitz. A 2012 release date was expected. The band also mentioned that a 20th anniversary world tour would accompany the album. They were announced to headline one of the biggest punk festivals in the world, Groezrock in Belgium. Tim Armstrong stated that Rancid's new album would arrive after the Transplants released their new one.

In March 2012, Rancid played some shows with Cock Sparrer. It was the 40th anniversary show for Cock Sparrer, and the 20th anniversary for Rancid. To accompany the shows, Pirates Press Records released a split 7-inch between the bands which featured "East Bay Night" from Rancid. As part of their 20th anniversary, they headlined the Rebellion Festival in Blackpool along with Public Image Limited, Social Distortion and Buzzcocks sharing headline slots, and on December 8, 2012 played in Birmingham along with Cock Sparrer as part of Rebellion Festival.

In December 2012, Rancid released their first new studio song in three years, titled "Fuck You", which they made available for free download on their website. The song was included on Oi! This is Streetpunk, Volume Two, which was released on December 12, 2012.

In 2012, Rancid released Rancid Essentials, an online-exclusive massive box set celebrating the band's 20th anniversary through Pirates Press Records. The box set features all of Rancid's officially released albums and compilations including their debut self-titled EP from 1992 through 2009. 92 sides of music on 46 re-mastered 45 rpm 7-inches housed in a leather box. The albums were released each on their own on 7-inch.

On February 6, 2013, Rancid uploaded a picture to their Facebook page of the band in the studio with the caption, "Recording has begun." In June of that year the band embarked on a North American headlining tour alongside Tim Armstrong's other band Transplants. In a December 2013 interview on Reddit, Rancid drummer Branden Steineckert revealed that the new album was called ...Honor Is All We Know and it would be released in 2014.

On September 28, 2014, Rancid revealed the artwork and track listing for ...Honor Is All We Know. On the day after, they announced that the album would be released on October 27, 2014. On September 30, 2014, the band released a video of them performing three of the album's tracks. The album peaked at number 15 on the U.S. Billboard 200, and charted in the top 100 in several other countries. The album received generally positive reviews, with many critics highlighting its energetic, classic Rancid sound and live-show potential.

In 2015 while on a world tour in support of …Honor Is All We Know they at Played Riot Fest & ran special shows celebrating …And Out Come the Wolves 20th anniversary.

On March 21, 2016, the band played on their first cruise ship in a Saint Patrick's Day celebration, along with Flogging Molly, Fishbone, the Street Dogs, Frank Turner and others.

=== Trouble Maker and Tomorrow Never Comes (2017–present) ===
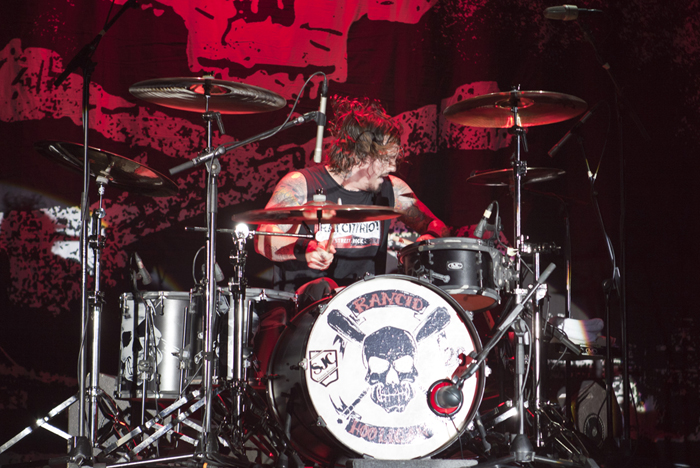
Branden Steineckert

On March 25, 2017, Rancid played for the first time in Brazil at the Lollapalooza São Paulo in front of an audience estimated in 100,000 people who attended that first of 2 days festival. Line up of that Saturday included also acts like Criolo, the xx and Metallica. On the occasion, Lars Frederiksen dedicated the last song of the gig, Ruby Soho for "Lemmy from Motörhead, the world is a much more fucked up place without you".

On May 2, 2017, Rancid announced on their Facebook page that their ninth studio album, Trouble Maker, would be released on June 9. The album sold 18,000 copies in its first week and debuted at number 23 on the U.S. Billboard 200 and number 2 on the U.S.Top Alternative Albums along with charting in 6 other countries. The album had positive reviews highlighting it its raw, political sound and classic punk energy. Rancid co-headlined the "From Boston to Berkeley Tour" with Dropkick Murphys in July and August 2017.

In June 2019, it was reported that Rancid had been working on their tenth studio album with a projected 2020 release, though the year passed without a new release.

Also in 2019, they headlined the traveling craft and beer festival The Bash, and toured North America in September, with support provided by Pennywise, Suicidal Tendencies, the English Beat, the Aquabats, Turnstile, Iron Reagan and Angel Du$t. On October 31, 2019, Rancid opened up for the original Misfits at Madison Square Garden.

Rancid announced in June 2021 that they would be co-headlining the Boston to Berkeley II North American tour with Dropkick Murphys from August to October 2021.

In a November 2021 interview with Kerrang!, Fredriksen confirmed that Rancid had been "putting the finishing touches" on their new album. On May 29, 2022 Rancid performed the entrance theme for AEW wrestler Ruby Soho at AEW Double or Nothing.

On April 18, 2023, Rancid announced that their tenth album, Tomorrow Never Comes, would be released on June 2, 2023. The album sold 9,500 countries in its first week, debuting at 126 on the Billboard 200 and in the top 20 on both the U.S Top Rock Albums and Alternative Albums charts. The album received high praise from critics for its high energy, classic punk sound, and catchy melodies. In support of the album Rancid went on a EU/UK tour which took place from June 2 to the 25. They also played two shows at Citizens House of Blues in Boston, Massachusetts on September 18, and 19, 2023.

In 2024, Rancid joined Green Day and The Smashing Pumpkins for the North American leg of the Saviors tour.

On October 16, 2025, Rancid released a cover of the Motörhead song "Sex & Death", which will be featured on the album 'Killed By Deaf - A Punk Tribute To Motörhead.

== Musical style and influences ==
Rancid is known for combining "high-energy punk with the infectious, quick-time bounce of second-wave ska". Steve Huey of AllMusic said Rancid "drew heavily on the political commentary and rock/reggae fusions of the Clash", and that their sound showed an apparent "fascination with ska while adding a bit of hardcore crunch".

Around the time of their release of their 1995 album …And Out Come The Wolves Variety wrote that the band "unashamedly takes much of its inspiration from the British scene of 20 years ago, but infuses that brand of straight-ahead punk with liberal doses of ska punch and even some bluesy rhythms, courtesy of bassist Matt Freeman."

The Clash are a major influence, especially in their classic punk and reggae fusion work. Rancid often gets compared to group in terms of combining punk, ska, and political content. The band's other influences include Motörhead and Social Distortion.

The group's lyrics have touched upon topics such as street life, working-class struggles, resilience, community anger, combativeness, authenticity, nostalgia, the music industry and political topics.

== Legacy ==
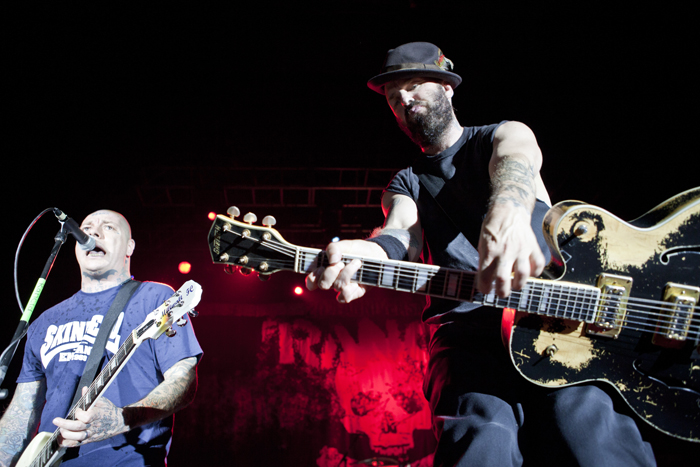
Rancid live in 2012

Rancid is credited (alongside Bad Religion, the Offspring, NOFX, Social Distortion, and Green Day) with popularizing mainstream interest in punk rock in the United States, particularly with the album ...And Out Come the Wolves which became a cultural phenomenon and truly helped catapult punk into the mainstream. The album has been listed as an essential punk album, and was listed in Kerrang!, Revolver and Rolling Stone reader's poll top 10 best punk albums of all time. Loudwire credited the band for "seemingly resurrecting gritty punk in the mainstream." The band have garnered a reputation as one of the top acts in all of punk and have sold over 4 million records.

They have been described by Alternative Press magazine as absolutely crucial to the fusion of ska, reggae and punk rock. Notably the band's song "Time Bomb" introduced many to the 2-Tone aesthetic and culture. Their fusion of these styles has been widely noted as a foundational influence on many modern punk and ska-punk bands. Bands that blend up-tempo punk with reggae or ska often draw directly/indirectly from Rancid's style.

In August 2025, a trailer was released for the upcoming film And Out Comes the Wolf, a direct reference to the bands 3rd studio album. The film will follow a fictional punk-themed plot that takes direct inspiration from band and the 90s east bay punk scene, with frontman Tim Armstrong being on set for a majority of the filming.

Bands and artists such as the Interrupters, Anti-Flag, Rise Against, Pennywise, Echo, P!nk, the Headlines, Dropkick Murphys, Good Charlotte, Street Dogs, and PUP have all cited Rancid as an influence.

The staff of Consequence ranked the band at number 11 on their list of "The 100 Best Pop Punk Bands" in 2019, the publication later included them on their list of "The 30 Best Punk Bands of All Time" placing them at number 16. In 2025, Jeff Mezydlo of Yardbarker included the band in his list of "20 underrated bands from the 1990s who are worth rediscovering".

== Band members ==
Rancid live in 2017

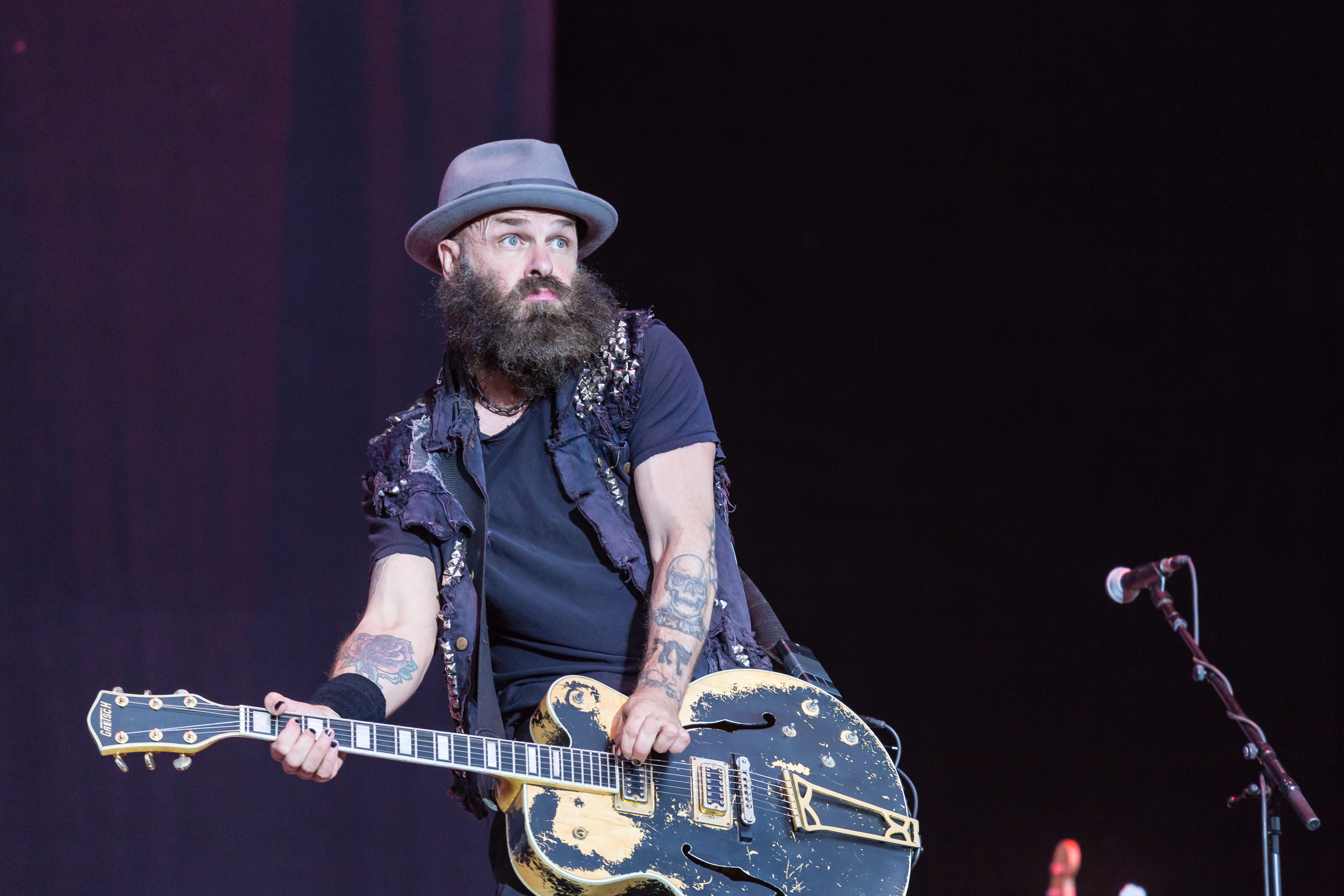
Tim Armstrong

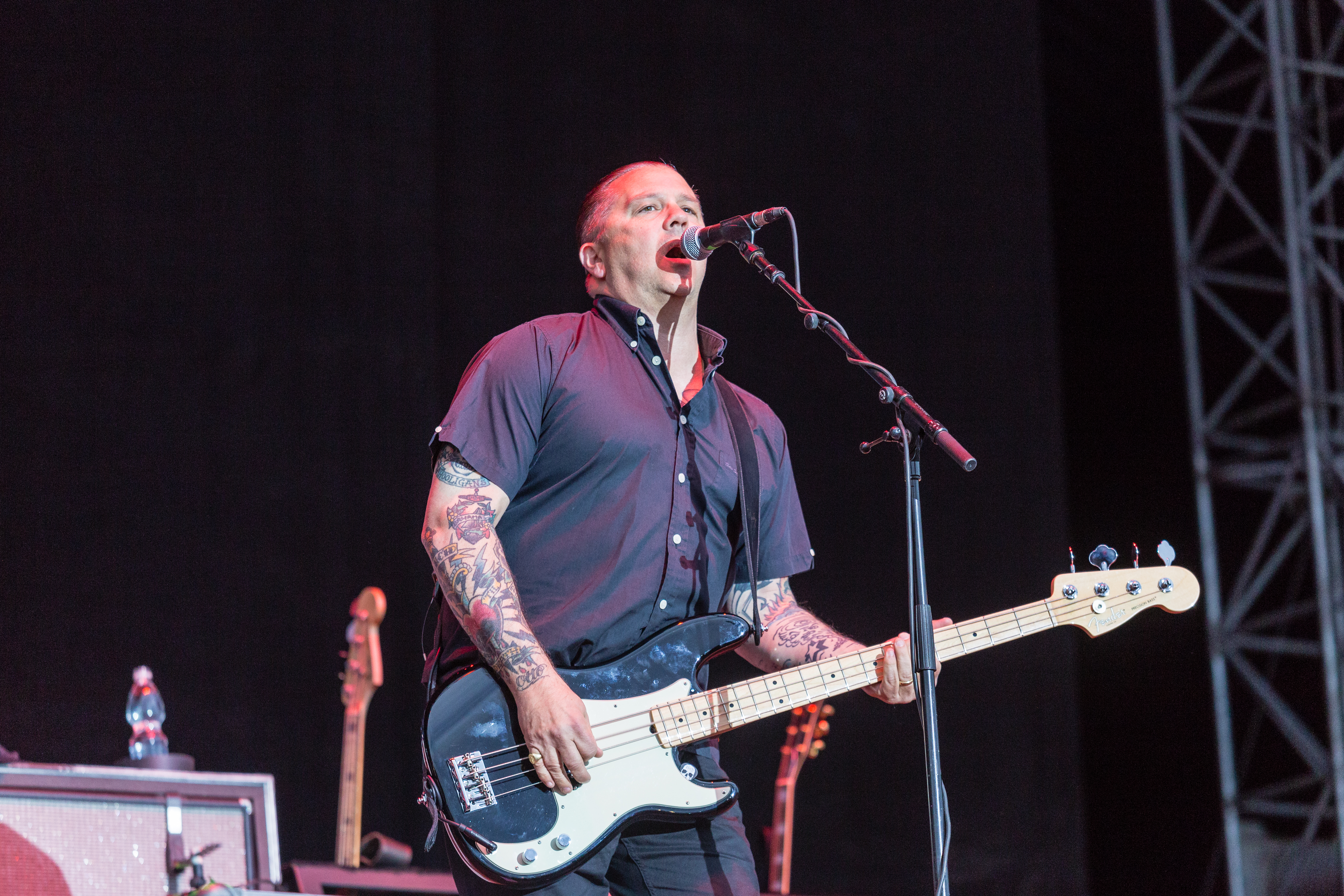
Matt Freeman

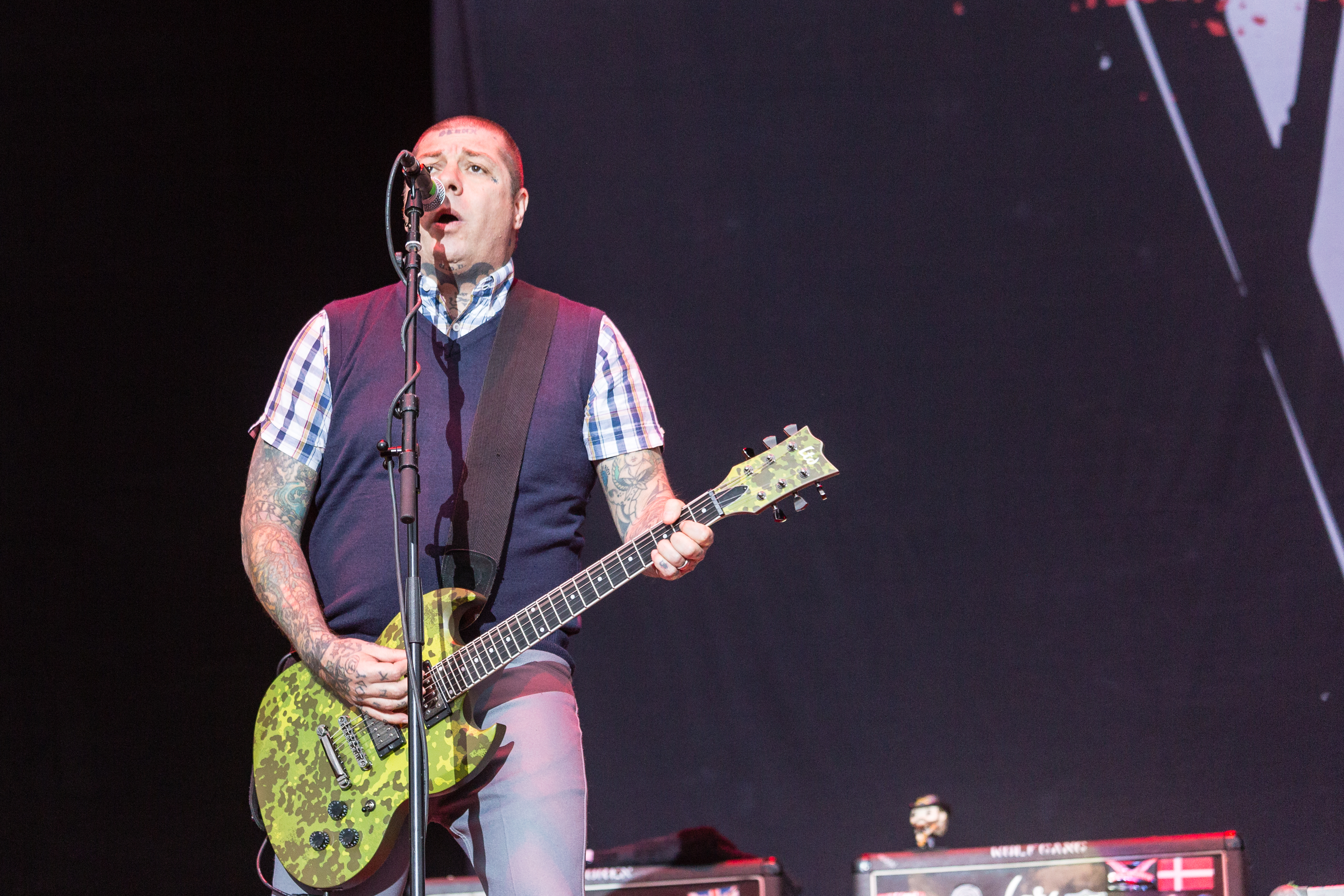
Lars Frederiksen

=== Current ===
- Tim Armstrong – vocals, guitar (1991–present)
- Matt Freeman – bass guitar, vocals (1991–present)
- Lars Frederiksen – guitar, vocals (1993–present)
- Branden Steineckert – drums, percussion, backing vocals (2006–present)

==== Current touring ====
- Kevin Bivona – keyboards, backing vocals (2012–present)

=== Former ===
- Brett Reed – drums, percussion, backing vocals (1991–2006)

=== Former touring ===
- Billie Joe Armstrong – guitar (1993)

== Awards and nominations ==
California Music Awards/Bammies

Year	Work/nominee	Award	Result
1994	Let's Go	Outstanding Debut Album	Won
1996	…And Out Come The Wolves	Outstanding Album	Nominated
1996	"Time Bomb"	Best Song	Nominated
1998	Life Won't Wait	Outstanding Punk/Ska Album	Won

Loudwire Music Awards

Year	Work/nominee	Award	Result
2014	…Honor Is All We Know	Rock Album of the Year	Nominated
2017	Matt Freeman	Best Bassist	Nominated

== Discography ==
- Rancid (1993)
- Let's Go (1994)
- ...And Out Come the Wolves (1995)
- Life Won't Wait (1998)
- Rancid (also known as "Rancid 2000" or "Rancid 5") (2000)
- Indestructible (2003)
- Let the Dominoes Fall (2009)
- ...Honor Is All We Know (2014)
- Trouble Maker (2017)
- Tomorrow Never Comes (2023)
