= Ruby Soho (song) =

Single by Rancid

from the album ...And Out Come the Wolves
- Released: November 3, 1995
- Recorded: February–May 1995
- Genre: Punk rock; ska punk
- Length: 2:37
- Label: Epitaph
- Songwriter: Tim Armstrong / Lars Frederiksen / Matt Freeman
- Producers: Jerry Finn, Rancid

Rancid singles chronology
"Time Bomb" (1995)	"Ruby Soho" (1995)	"Bloodclot" (1998)

"Ruby Soho" is a song by the American punk rock band Rancid. It was released as the third and final single from their third album, ...And Out Come the Wolves. The song reached number 13 on the Billboard Modern Rock Tracks. Spin listed the song on their list of the 95 best alt-rock songs of 1995.

== Track listing ==
1. "Ruby Soho" - 2:37
2. "That's Entertainment" - 1:29
3. "Disorder and Disarray" - 2:49

== Samples ==
"Ruby Soho" uses a sample of "Give Me Power" by The Stingers (1971) as an intro to the song.

== Cover versions ==
The song has been covered by artists such as American punk rock band The Dollyrots on their 2018 album "Get Radical", Japanese voice actress Rie Tanaka on the compilation Puncolle - Voice Actresses' Legendary Punk Songs Collection, as well as the Japanese rock band BIS. It was also covered by American indie rock band Vampire Weekend in February 2010 during a BBC radio session and by Jimmy Cliff on both his Sacred Fire EP (2011), and his album Rebirth (2012). Phish's Mike Gordon began covering the song (based on Jimmy Cliff's cover) during his 2017 Winter Tour.

== In popular culture ==
On July 21, 2009, "Ruby Soho" was released along with "Time Bomb" and "Last One to Die" in the Rancid 01 track pack for Rock Band 2. The song was released, along with "21st Century (Digital Boy)" by Bad Religion and "Linoleum" by NOFX as downloadable content for Guitar Hero World Tour and Guitar Hero 5. The Australian rock band Violent Soho's name was inspired partially from the song's name. The song is referenced in the Rare Americans track "Full Moon". On May 23, 2024, "Ruby Soho" was added to the list of Jam Tracks available in Fortnite Festival, alongside "Fuel" by Metallica, "Blitzkrieg Bop" by Ramones, and "Dragula" by Rob Zombie

Professional wrestler Dori Prange wrestled under the name Ruby Riott in WWE and she said the name was inspired by Ruby Soho. Prange was released by WWE in June 2021 and lost the rights to use the Ruby Riott name, however, during a June 18, 2021 interview with Lars Frederiksen on his Wrestling Perspective Podcast, he suggested that she change her name to Ruby Soho and how he could clear the song for her in minutes. Prange confirmed the name change to Ruby Soho on her Instagram page. Prange, now going by Ruby Soho, then debuted for All Elite Wrestling (AEW) at the promotion's pay-per-view, All Out, on September 5, 2021, also using the song "Ruby Soho" as her entrance music.

== Charts ==
1996 chart performance for "Ruby Soho"
Chart (1996)	Peak position
Australia (ARIA)	64
Canada Rock/Alternative (RPM)	9
US Modern Rock Tracks (Billboard)	13
US Radio Songs (Billboard)	63

2025 chart performance for "Ruby Soho"
Chart (2025)	Peak position
Russia Streaming (TopHit)	98
