= Branden Steineckert =

American drummer

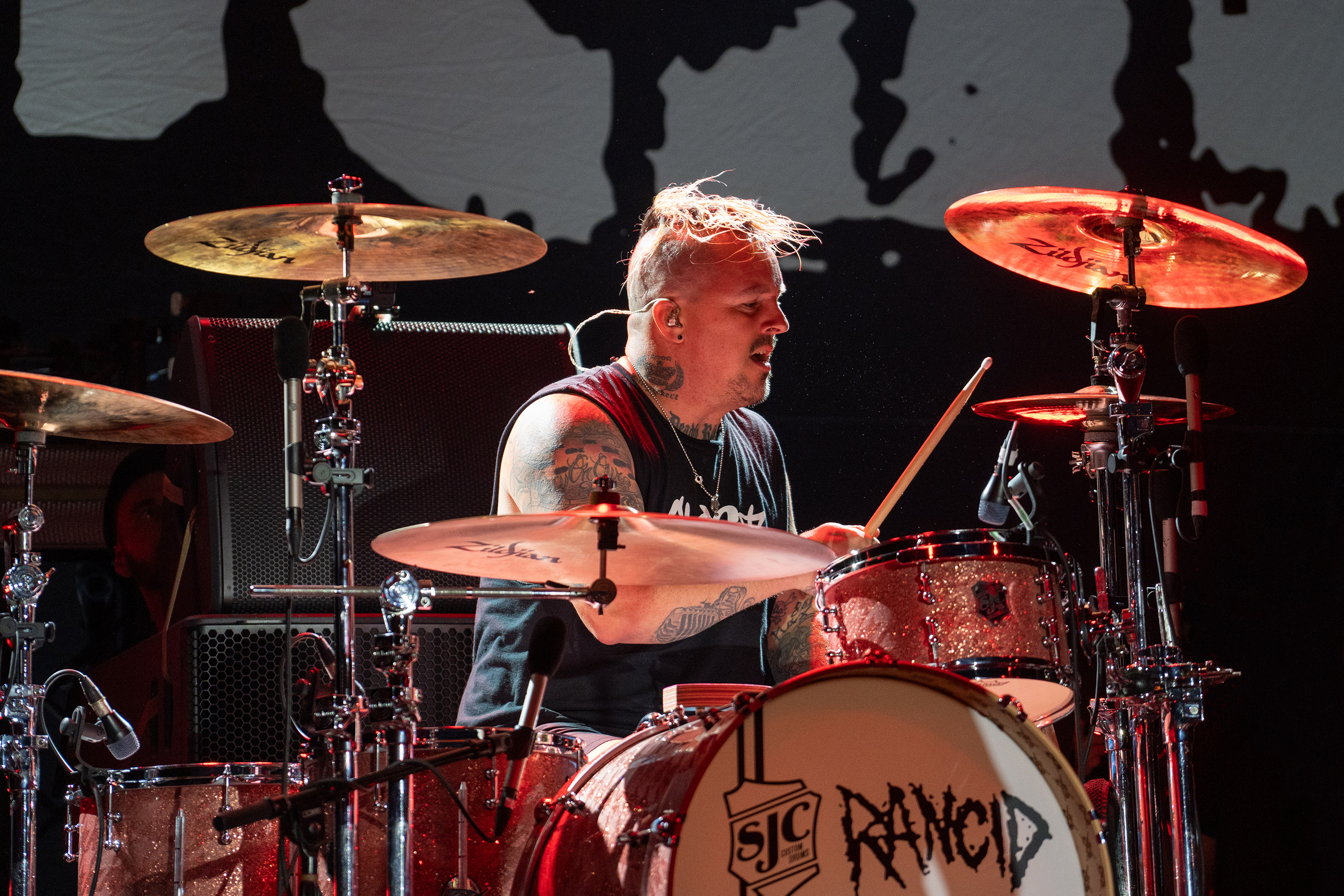
- Steineckert in 2023

Background information
- Born: April 21, 1978 (age 47); Pocatello, Idaho, U.S.
- Genres: Post-hardcore; emo; punk rock; ska punk; alternative rock
- Occupation: Drummer
- Member of: Rancid
- Formerly of: The Used; Apocalypse Radio

Branden Steineckert (born April 21, 1978) is an American musician. He is the drummer for the punk rock band Rancid and a founding member and previous drummer of the Used.

== Biography ==
Steineckert is an avid soccer fan and supporter of Real Salt Lake, a Major League Soccer (MLS) club based in Sandy, Utah. He is a season ticket holder and writer of the official team chant 'Believe'.

Branden was born in Pocatello, Idaho. He picked up skateboarding at an early age because his friends skated. When Branden was 11 years old, his father, Neil Steineckert, died by suicide, so he picked up drumming as a way to release his anger and to relieve him of his troubles.

Branden learned to play the drums because his late father had played drums at around his age.

On November 3, 2006, it was announced that Steineckert would be playing drums for Rancid until the end of their tour. He replaced their drummer of 15 years, Brett Reed. On the tour, Rancid members stated that Steineckert would be a permanent addition to the band (also noted on the official Used fansite). In the August 2009 issue of DRUM! Magazine, Steineckert commented on how quickly things moved as soon as he began to play with Rancid: "It was nuts. My first show, I was playing songs I'd never played even on a drum set, in front of 2,500 kids in England." Branden's first recording with the band was their 2009 album Let the Dominoes Fall, although it had been in the writing process since 2005, a year before he joined. He also appeared on their eighth album Honor Is All We Know, which was released on October 27, 2014.

In late 2010 Steineckert filled in for Goldfinger's drummer (Darrin Pfeiffer) for a few West Coast shows due to prior arrangements.

== Discography ==
Strange Itch

- Strange Itch (1998)

Dumb Luck

- The Naked Truth (2000)

Apocalypse Radio

- Apocalypse Radio, (EP, 2001)
- One More Revolution (2002)
- Apocalypse Radio (2010)

The Used

- Demos from the Basement (2001)
- The Used (2002)
- Maybe Memories (2003)
- In Love and Death (2004)

Rancid

- Let the Dominoes Fall (2009)
- Honor Is All We Know (2014)
- Trouble Maker (2017)
- Tomorrow Never Comes (2023)

=== Producing ===
- The Used Demos from the Basement (June 2001)
- The Eyeliners, (2003)
- The Chemistry, (2003)
- Broke City The Answer, (2005–2006)
- Return To Sender, (2007)
- Searchlight, (2007)
- Searchlight, Resident Evil: Extinction Soundtrack, (2007)

=== Studio drum work ===
- Shane Hurley (Left & Right) Fashion Rocks, (2003)
- Mercy Killers Give Em The Boot 4, (2004)
- A Perfect Circle (The Outsider Remix) Resident Evil 2: Apocalypse Soundtrack, (2004)
- Alex Warren & Danny Lohner (The Scientist) Wicker Park Soundtrack, (2004)
- Secondhand Serenade Forthcoming Album, (2007)
- Resistor Radio Beggars Cuisine, (2009)
