= Leather, Bristles, No Survivors and Sick Boys... =

Compilation album by Charged GBH
- Released: December 1982
- Studio: FSR Studios, Birmingham
- Genre: hardcore punk
- Length: 33:34
- Label: Clay Records (Clay LP 4) (UK), Captain Oi! (Ahoy CD 185)
- Producer: Mike "Clay" Stone

Charged GBH chronology
City Baby Attacked by Rats (1982)	Leather, Bristles, No Survivors and Sick Boys... (1982)	City Babys Revenge (1983)

Professional ratings
Review scores
Source	Rating
AllMusic	2/5 stars
The Encyclopedia of Popular Music	3/5 stars
Smash Hits	6/10

Leather, Bristles, No Survivors and Sick Boys... is a compilation album by British hardcore punk band Charged GBH. It was released in 1982 via the band's own label Clay Records and contain set of previously released EP and 7-inch singles.

== Track listing ==
Clay Records – CLAY LP5 Side 1
No.	Title	Length
1.	"Race Against Time"	2:45
2.	"Knifes Edge"	2:14
3.	"Lycanthhropy"	2:34
4.	"Necrophilia"	1:58
5.	"State Executioner"	2:33
6.	"Dead on Arrival"	1:38
7.	"Generals"	3:19

Side 2
No.	Title	Length
1.	"No Survivors"	2:35
2.	"Self Destruct"	2:01
3.	"Big Women"	2:17
4.	"Sick Boy"	2:33
5.	"Slit Your Own Throat"	2:07
6.	"Am I Dead Yet?"	2:31
7.	"Freak"	2:29
8.	"Alcohol"
