= Diplomatic Immunity (disambiguation) =

Diplomatic immunity is a form of legal immunity for diplomats working outside their home countries.

Diplomatic immunity or Diplomatic Immunity may also refer to:

== Film and television ==
- Diplomatic Immunity (1991 American film), directed by Peter Maris
- Diplomatic Immunity (1991 Canadian film), directed by Sturla Gunnarsson
- Diplomatic Immunity (Canadian TV series), a news magazine series which ran from 1998 to 2006
- Diplomatic Immunity (New Zealand TV series), a 2009 TV comedy about a fictional consulate

== Music ==
- Diplomatic Immunity (The Diplomats album), 2003
- Diplomatic Immunity (Client Liaison album), 2016
- "Diplomatic Immunity" (song), a 2018 song by Drake from the EP Scary Hours
- "Diplomatic Immunity", song by Charged GBH from City Babys Revenge

== Novels ==
- Diplomatic Immunity (novel), by Lois McMaster Bujold, 2002
