= Oi! the Boat Records =

- Parent company: Oi the Boat, LLC
- Distributor: Independent
- Genre: Punk rock; oi!; ska; streetpunk
- Country of origin: United States of America
- Location: Lafayette, IN
- Official website: oitheboat.com

Oi! the Boat Records is an independent record label based in Lafayette, Indiana. The label was started as a digital distribution only record label to release Yakimick's former bands' early recordings. It has since evolved into an internationally recognized independent label with a back catalog of vinyl and digital releases from both established and relatively unknown acts from half a dozen countries worldwide.

The label specializes in punk, oi!, ska, and hardcore bands.

== History ==
=== Growth ===
In 2009, the label released its first vinyl output: a split 7-inch vinyl EP with Stamford Bridge (Carl Fritcher from iconic US Oi! band The Templars (band)) and Bastards Choir. In 2009, Max Campbell of Bastards Choir and Hudson Falcons joined Yakimicki as co-owner of Oi! the Boat.

In 2010, the label released the popular Swedish Oi! band Perkele's EP entitled "Punk Rock Army" through a collaboration with Germany's Bandworm Records who had previously rereleased Yakimicks former band Brassknuckle Boys LP "Songs About Fighting" on vinyl.

=== Gaining notoriety ===
In late 2010, Lars Frederiksen of punk band Rancid and Lars Frederiksen and the Bastards contacted Oi! the Boat Records about the possibility of releasing music by his new Oi! band, The Old Firm Casuals. To date, Oi! the Boat has released 3 EPs by the band, including a split double 7-inch vinyl EP with the seminal UK Oi! band The Last Resort.

== Discography ==
- OTB#1 Brassknuckle Boys "Songs About Fighting" (digital
- OTB#2 Green Room Rockers "Hoosier Homegrown" (digital)
- OTB#3 Hudson Falcons 'Desire to Burn' (digital)
- OTB#4 Stamford Bridge / Bastards Choir (split 7-inch)
- OTB#5 The Cliches (digital(deleted))
- OTB#6 Green Room Rockers "Green Room Rockers" (digital)
- OTB#7 Perkele "Punk Rock Army" (7-inch)
- OTB#8 Minivan "Shake My Shakes Away" (7-inch)
- OTB#9 The Old Firm Casuals S/T (7-inch)
- OTB#10 Armed Suspects & Broken Heroes "For the Punks & Skins" 12-inch
- OTB#11 The Last Resort / The Old Firm Casuals -Split (double 7-inch)
- OTB#12 Unit Six "Infection" (7-inch)
- OTB#13 Noi!se / Gestalts split (7-inch)
- OTB#14 The Old Firm Casuals "Army of One" (7-inch)
- OTB#15 Peter and the Test Tube Babies / Pennycocks split EP (7-inch)
- OTB#16 Whiskey Rebels "These Inside Jokes Are Killing Me" (12-inch)
- OTB#17 Brassknuckle Boys / Stomper 98 split EP (7-inch)
- OTB#18 Hooligan "No Blacks, No Irish, No Dogs" EP (7-inch)
- OTB#19 Cold Feelings "American Industry LP (12-inch)
- OTB#20 VOi!CE of America Vol. 1 V/A EP (7-inch)
- OTB#21 Victory "Laced Up" (7-inch)
- OTB#22 The Old Firm Casuals "For the Love of it All..." Double LP/CD
- OTB#23 Victory "Twin Cities" EP (7-inch)
- OTB#24 VOi!CE of America Vol. 2 V/A EP (7-inch)
- OTB#25 Brick Assassin - "Chicago Brick Crew" (7-inch)
- OTB#26 Die Tring! "Die Trying" (7-inch)
- OTB#27 VOi!CE of America Vol. 3 V/A EP (7-inch)
- OTB#28 Victory / Brick Assassin "Best of Midwest Oi!" (7-inch)
- OTB#29 Duffy's Cut "Duffy's Cut" (12-inch/CD)
- OTB#30 Anger Flares (7-inch)
- OTB#31 Oxley's Midnight Runners (in production)
- OTB#32 Hooligan "Criminal Damage (7-inch)
- OTB#33 VOi!CE of America Vol. 4 V/A EP (7-inch)
- OTB#34 The Old Firm Casuals "Perry Boys" (7-inch)
- OTB#35 Brass Tacks / Virgin Whores – Off the Top Rope 7″ (August 2015 · Oi! the Boat · OTB#35)
- OTB#36 Cliches / Victory – A Smokin' Split 7″ (Dec 15 2014 · Oi! the Boat / Randale)
- OTB#37 The Old Firm Casuals – This Means War LP (12″/CD) (July 29 2014 · Oi! the Boat Records U.S., Randale Records DE)
- OTB#38 Justice Blocc – Justice Blocc EP (Aug 8 2014 · Oi! the Boat Records)
- OTB#39 Oxley's Midnight Runners – Invasion 7″ (Feb 24 2015 · Oi! the Boat / Randale)
- OTB#40 GARRY BUSHELL & OI! THE BOAT Records PRESENT: OI! STILL FIGHTING!!! V/A CD (May 2015 · Oi! the Boat)
- OTB#41 Duffy's Cut / Idle Gossip split 7″ (Oct 26 2015 · Oi! the Boat / Contra)
- OTB#42 Anger Flares / Bad Engrish split 7″ (Spring 2015 · Oi! the Boat)
- OTB#43 Assault & Battery – All the Shades of Truth LP (May 2015 · Oi! the Boat /Rebellion)
- OTB#44 Hard Evidence / Dog Company split 7″ (Fall 2015 · Oi! the Boat /Cadre)
- OTB#45 Oxley's Midnight Runners – Combat 7″ (Dec 2015 · Oi! the Boat / Randale)
- OTB#46 Oxley's Midnight Runners – Conquest 7″ (Apr 28 2016 · Oi! the Boat / Randale)
- OTB#47 Oxley's Midnight Runners – The Battle (Singles Collection) 12″ LP (Mar 2017 · Oi! the Boat (US) / Randale (Europe))
- OTB#48 The Slads – Demo / Tough Times 12″ LP(limited 180 g PVC sleeve – includes cassette releases)
- OTB#49 The Slads – Demo cassette (100 black, yellow cover – Jan 2024)
- OTB#50 The Slads – Tough Times Cassette (100 Black Cassettes with Yellow Cover – Art by Jeff Poleon)
- OTB#51 The Old Firm Casuals – A Butchers Banquet 12″ maxi‑EP (June 2016 · Oi! the Boat / Randale)
- OTB#52 La Inquisición – S/T 7″ EP (2016)
- OTB#53 Duffy's Cut – Killers on the Dancefloor LP (Mar 2017)
- OTB#54 Empire Down – S/T debut 7″ EP (Mar 15 2018)
- OTB#55 The Press – Torch 7″ EP (9/14/2018)
- OTB#56 LVGER – Debut 12″ Maxi EP (Mar 2019 · 110 smoke vinyl / 170 black vinyl)
- OTB#57 Brassknuckle Boys – Five on One 7″ EP (Mar 2019 · 100 black / 200 white vinyl)
- OTB#58 The New York Hounds – God Bless the Royal Hounds Multiple Pressings (June 2019 · various black / white vinyl pressings)
- OTB#59 Televised Suicide – S/T 12″ LP (Nov 2019 · 28 black + blue vinyl / 190 black vinyl / 100 CDs)
- OTB#60 Concrete Elite – Absolute Guard 12″ Maxi EP (Feb 2020 · 500 copies – 350 black/silver splatter / 150 black vinyl)
- OTB#61 Béton Armé – Au Bord Du Gouffre 12″ EP (Oct 2020 · 250 single‑sided red cover / 75 hand‑numbered blue cover)
- OTB#62 The Slads – Tough Times Cassette (Jan 2024 · 100 Black Cassettes with Yellow Cover)
