= Bloodclot (song) =

Single by Rancid

from the album Life Won't Wait
- Released: 1998
- Recorded: 1997–mid-1998
- Genre: Punk rock, ska punk
- Length: 2:45
- Label: Epitaph Europe
- Songwriter: Tim Armstrong / Lars Frederiksen
- Producers: Tim Armstrong and Lars Frederiksen

Rancid singles chronology
| "Ruby Soho" (1995) | "Bloodclot" (1998) | ""Hooligans"" (1998) |

Bloodclot is a song by the American punk rock band Rancid. It is the second track on the group's fourth studio album Life Won't Wait (1998) and was released as the album's first single.

== Track listing ==
1. "Bloodclot" - 2:45
2. "Endrina" - 1:14
3. "Stop" - 1:41

== In popular culture ==
"Bloodclot" was featured in the ESPN X-Games Pro Boarder. The song was also featured in the film Idle Hands (1999).

== Charts ==
| Chart (1998) | Peak position |
|---|---|
| Scottish Singles (OCC) | 97 |
| UK singles (OCC) | 98 |
| UK Indie (OCC) | 15 |
| UK Physical Singles (OCC) | 83 |
