= Rancid (2000 album) =

Studio album by Rancid
- Released: August 1, 2000
- Recorded: April 2000
- Studio: Westbeach Recorders, Hollywood, California; Sound City, Van Nuys, California
- Genre: Hardcore punk
- Length: 38:15
- Label: Hellcat, Epitaph
- Producer: Brett Gurewitz

Rancid chronology
Life Won't Wait (1998)	Rancid (2000)	BYO Split Series, Vol. 3 (2002)

Singles from Rancid
- 1. "Let Me Go" Released: 2000

Rancid (also known as Rancid 5 or Rancid 2000 to avoid confusion with their debut album) is the fifth studio album by the American punk rock band Rancid, released on August 1, 2000. It is the second eponymous album and the first to be released through frontman Tim Armstrong's label, Hellcat Records. It also features the return of producer Brett Gurewitz, who has produced every subsequent album by the band.

== Production and composition ==
Recording concluded in April 2000.

It is Rancid's most hardcore offering to date, which was released as a follow-up to the more ska and reggae oriented Life Won't Wait. It spans 22 tracks in under 40 minutes, owing to over 3/4 of the songs clocking at under 2 minutes. "Maggots" was recorded, but that ended up being a song on Lars Frederiksen & the Bastards record. The Japanese version includes one bonus track, "Sick Sick World". Songs on the album make reference to famous gangster Al Capone, as well as the Norse god Loki, John Brown, Ulysses S. Grant, Nelson Mandela, Charles Van Doren, Geoffrey Chaucer's Canterbury Tales and Don Giovanni. Brett Gurewitz (Bad Religion) reunited with Rancid and became their producer for this album. It was 6 years since he co-produced the band's second album Let's Go (1994), although he engineered the band's third album, ...And Out Come the Wolves (1995). Rancid and Gurewitz would continue their collaboration for their next five albums, Indestructible, Let the Dominoes Fall, Honor Is All We Know, Trouble Maker, and Tomorrow Never Comes.

On the record released to the public, there was a mastering error on the track "Poison" on the first run of CDs pressed, but was fixed in subsequent pressings and is not present on the vinyl copies of the record.

== Release ==
"Disgruntled" was posted on the band's website on June 3, 2000. A joint music video for "Don Giovanni" and "Disgruntled" was directed by Tim Armstrong. Shortly after this, a demo version of "Poison" was released on Punk-O-Rama 5. "Let Me Go" was released as the album's lone official single while "Radio Havana" was released as a promotional single. Music videos for "Let Me Go", "GGF (Golden Gate Fields)", "Young Al Capone", "I Am Forever", "Dead Bodies", "Rwanda", "Blackhawk Down", "Black Derby Jacket", "Rattlesnake", "Poison" and "Loki" were also released.

After being planned for release in May 2000, Rancid was eventually released on August 1, 2000. In November, the band embarked on tour of the US, with support from AFI and the Distillers. Between June and August 2001, the group performed on the Warped Tour. Following this, the band appeared at the Reading and Leeds Festivals.

== Reception ==
Professional ratings
Aggregate scores
Source	Rating
Metacritic	78/100
Review scores
Source	Rating
AllMusic	4/5 stars
Entertainment Weekly	A−
NME	6/10
Ox-Fanzine	Favorable
Rolling Stone	3.5/5 stars
Select	3/5 medals
Spin	8/10

The album received mostly positive reviews, though it failed to meet the success of Rancid's three previous albums. Rick Anderson of AllMusic noted "After several fine, if rather derivative, albums of ska-inflected punk rock, and after years of being criticized for relying unduly on gestures lifted from the Clash, Rancid has come roaring out with the harshest and most consistent album of their career. It wouldn't be entirely accurate to say that they've left their influences behind; rather, they've integrated them more completely and created a sound that is completely satisfying without having to prove anything about its own originality. That sound ends up being something like a cross between the Clash circa 1978 and the hardcore punk of the early-'80s Los Angeles scene. "Rwanda" is a stutter-step anthem of sympathy for a devastated country; "Corruption" has an atonal power-chord progression and headlong tempo that Minor Threat would have killed for; and "Blackhawk Down" is built on a ridiculously catchy descending bassline and a distinctly Oi!-flavored singalong chorus. No ska, no reggae, no dub, just 22 tracks in 38 minutes with barely a pause between songs and high tempos all the way. If you're looking for artistic subtlety, go back to the catalog; if all you need is a half-hour of undiluted adrenaline, you've come to the right place." Select gave the album a rating of three out of five, referring to the album as "infectious as they are insufferable".

== Track listing ==
All tracks are written by Tim Armstrong, except where noted.

No.	Title	Lead vocals	Length
1.	"Don Giovanni"	Armstrong	0:35
2.	"Disgruntled"	Armstrong	1:00
3.	"It's Quite Alright"	Armstrong	1:29
4.	"Let Me Go"	Armstrong	3:13
5.	"I Am Forever"	Frederiksen	1:04
6.	"Poison"	Armstrong	1:17
7.	"Loki"	Frederiksen	0:47
8.	"Blackhawk Down"	Armstrong	1:41
9.	"Rwanda"	Armstrong	1:20
10.	"Corruption" (Armstrong, Lars Frederiksen, Matt Freeman)	Frederiksen, Freeman, Armstrong	1:27
11.	"Antennas"	Armstrong	1:10
12.	"Rattlesnake"	Armstrong	1:42
13.	"Not to Regret"	Armstrong	2:16
14.	"Radio Havana"	Armstrong	3:42
15.	"Axiom" (Armstrong, Frederiksen, Freeman)	Frederiksen	1:40
16.	"Black Derby Jacket"	Freeman	2:35
17.	"Meteor of War"	Armstrong	1:21
18.	"Dead Bodies" (Armstrong, Frederiksen)	Frederiksen	1:49
19.	"Rigged on a Fix"	Freeman	1:16
20.	"Young Al Capone" (Armstrong, Frederiksen)	Frederiksen	1:52
21.	"Reconciliation"	Freeman	1:20
22.	"GGF (Golden Gate Fields)"	Armstrong	3:39

Japanese bonus track
No.	Title	Length
23.	"Sick Sick World"	1:18
Total length:		38:24

== Personnel ==
Rancid

- Tim Armstrong – vocals, guitar
- Lars Frederiksen – guitar, vocals
- Matt Freeman – bass, vocals
- Brett Reed – drums

Technical

- Brett Gurewitz – producer, mixing
- Thomas "TJ" Johnson – engineer, mixing
- Donnell Cameron – assistant engineer
- Jay Gordon – assistant engineer
- Eric Miller – assistant engineer
- Tony Rambo – assistant engineer
- Bob Ludwig – mastering
- Tim Armstrong – artwork
- Lars Frederiksen – artwork
- Kristin Vanderlip – artwork

== Charts ==
Chart performance for Rancid
Chart (2000)	Peak position
Australian Albums (ARIA)	73
Finnish Albums (Suomen virallinen lista)	39
UK Albums (OCC)	68
US Billboard 200	68
