= Perfume and Piss =

Studio album by GBH
- Released: 5 April 2010
- Recorded: April–July, 2009
- Studio: Robannas Studios (Birmingham, UK)
- Genre: Hardcore punk; street punk; punk rock
- Length: 38:57
- Label: Hellcat
- Producer: Lars Frederiksen

GBH chronology
Ha Ha (2002)	Perfume and Piss (2010)	Momentum (2017)

Professional ratings
Review scores
Source	Rating
AllMusic	3.5/5 stars

Perfume and Piss is the eleventh studio album by British punk rock band GBH and their first record released via Hellcat Records. It was recorded from April to July 2009 and released in Europe on 5 April 2010 and in the United States on 6 April 2010. The album was produced by GBH longtime fan and friend Lars Frederiksen.

== Track listing ==
Tracklist adapted from iTunes

No.	Title	Length
1.	"Unique"	2:27
2.	"Kids Get Down"	2:03
3.	"Perfume and Piss"	2:45
4.	"Cadillac One"	3:16
5.	"San Jose Wind"	2:19
6.	"Dead Man Walking"	2:37
7.	"Invisible Gun"	3:04
8.	"This Is Not the Real World"	2:49
9.	"Polytoxic"	3:00
10.	"Ballads"	2:59
11.	"Power Corrupts"	3:14
12.	"Going Sideways"	3:42
13.	"Time Flies"	4:42
Total length:		38:57

== Personnel ==
- Colin Abrahall - vocals
- Colin "Jock" Blyth - guitar
- Ross Lomas - bass
- Scott Preece - drums
- Michael Rosen - mastering & mixing
- Lars Frederiksen - mixing
- Miguel Seco - engineering
- Tom D. Kline - artwork & design
- Craig Burton - photography
- Johnny Fletcher-Fujimoto - photography
- Miranda Termaat - photography
