= Lars Frederiksen =

American punk rock musician (born 1971)

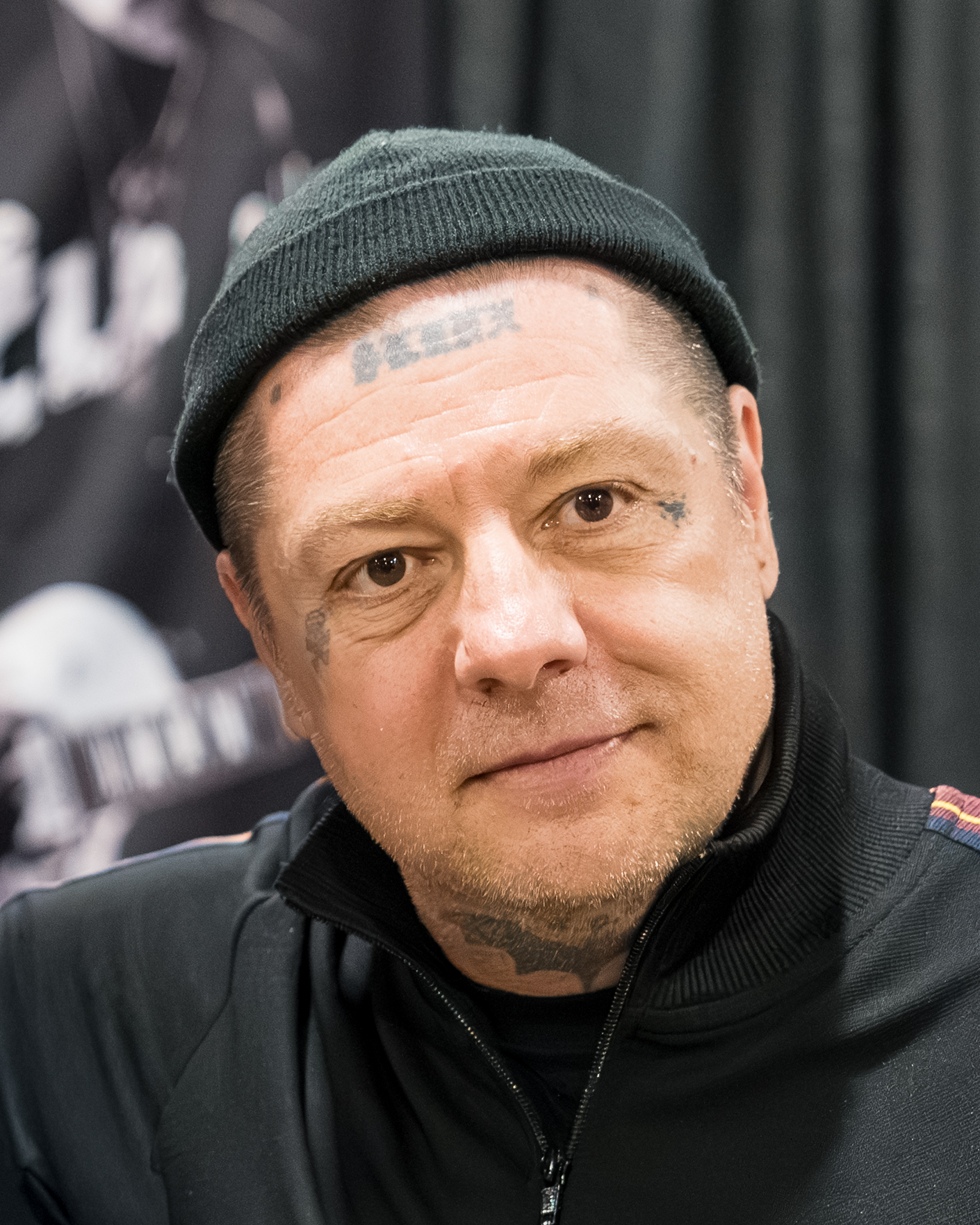
- Frederiksen in 2026

Background information
- Born: Lars Erik Dapello; August 30, 1971 (age 55)
- Origin: Campbell, California, U.S.
- Genres: Punk rock; ska punk; street punk; hardcore punk; oi!
- Occupations: Musician; record producer; songwriter
- Instruments: Guitar; vocals
- Years active: 1986–present
- Member of: Rancid; Oxley's Midnight Runners; Stomper 98; The Last Resort; The Old Firm Casuals
- Formerly of: UK Subs

Lars Erik Frederiksen (born Lars Erik Dapello, August 30, 1971) is an American musician and record producer best known as a guitarist and vocalist for the punk rock band Rancid, as well as the frontman of Lars Frederiksen and the Bastards and the Old Firm Casuals. In addition, he currently plays guitar in Oxley's Midnight Runners, Stomper 98, and the Last Resort. He was also briefly a member of the UK Subs in 1991.

Frederiksen joined Rancid in 1993 after the band was searching for a second guitar player and was present on their second album, Let's Go. He has produced albums for bands such as Dropkick Murphys, Agnostic Front, the Business, Swingin' Utters, Marky Ramone and the Intruders, Anti-Heros, Pressure Point, and the Forgotten, among others. He mixed GBH's 2010 album entitled Perfume and Piss, as well as Cock Sparrer's 2007 album, Here We Stand, both alongside Michael Rosen.

== Early life ==
Lars Erik Frederiksen was born and raised in San Francisco Bay Area on August 30, 1971, by his mother, Minna Dapello (née Frederiksen), after his father, John, left at age three. Minna Dapello was a Danish immigrant who, according to Frederiksen, was the only member of her family to survive the Nazi German occupation of Denmark (1940–45) during and after World War II, after her family was killed in front of her. Growing up he his older brother and mother would visit Denmark often where he was first introduced to music such as glam metal and David Bowie.

Frederiksen became introduced to Oi! music during his time in middle school with much of his musical taste being influenced by his older brother. During this time he first started getting involved in skinhead culture in an interview with Vice he commented on this stating "I mean, most eleven-year-olds don’t know what a skinhead is, but my brother was bringing home music and I always looked up to him. All the music I was exposed to was because of him, so by seventh grade I was a skinhead walking around yelling “Oi! at people and wearing boots, bleached jeans and suspenders to school. They would call me “Farmer Tom” and shit like that; I I would be like, No, I’m into Oi! music!” and they would say, What the fuck is that."

Frederiksen first got inspired to become a musician after going to local punk shows and thinking to himself "I can be a part of that too." By the time he was 15 he had already been to juvenile hall and dropped out school.

== Career ==
=== Early career and Rancid ===
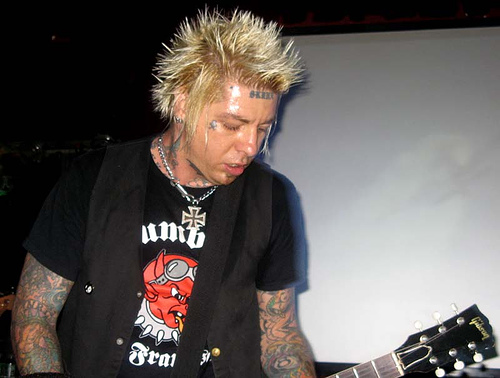
Frederiksen performing in 2007

After dropping out school Frederiksen started to get involved with local bands and playing guitar:

I mean, I got into music to get out of my fucking shitty neighborhood. I picked up a guitar out of survival. I didn’t do it to try to be like Eddie Van Halen. I didn’t do it to be a rock star. I did it so I could make some money and get out of the projects housing that I grew up in.

He first gained notoriety by playing with the U.K. Subs on their 1991 U.K. tour. Then in 1993 he joined Rancid making his debut on their 1993 Ep Radio Radio Radio. From here Rancid went on to become one of the most critically acclaimed and commercially successful punk rock bands of all time, with Frederiksen recording 9 studio albums with the band the most recent being 2023’s Tomorrow Never Comes.

Frederiksen has expressed his personal dislike for signing to major record labels numerous times.

Kids come up to us all the time and say, "We're in a band and we're never going to sign to some major label. We're going to stay independent like you guys. You guys proved you don't need to sign some major label and all that bullshit [to be successful]." That's the most gratifying thing anyone can say to me or to any of us.

=== Lars Frederiksen & the Bastards ===
While still a member of Rancid Frederiksen started a side project named Lars Frederiksen & the Bastards. They released their self titled debut in 2001 where Frederiksen provided lead vocals and lead guitar Jason Woods played bass and Scott Abels tracked the drums. Overall the album was met with positive reception. The group went on to release their second album, Viking, in 2004, and their most recent release was an 2006 Ep titled Switchblade.

=== The Old Firm Casuals ===
In 2010 Frederiksen founded another side project, a street punk trio called the Old Firm Casuals alongside Casey Watson (Look Back and Laugh) and Paul Rivas. The group released multiple eps before their first full-length album, For the Love of It All.. was released in 2013. The group have since released three more albums including This Means War (2014), A Butcher's Banquet (2016) and Holger Danske (2019). He has described the project as a snapshot into his record collection, being heavily influenced by many of his favorite bands.

=== Other projects and appearances ===
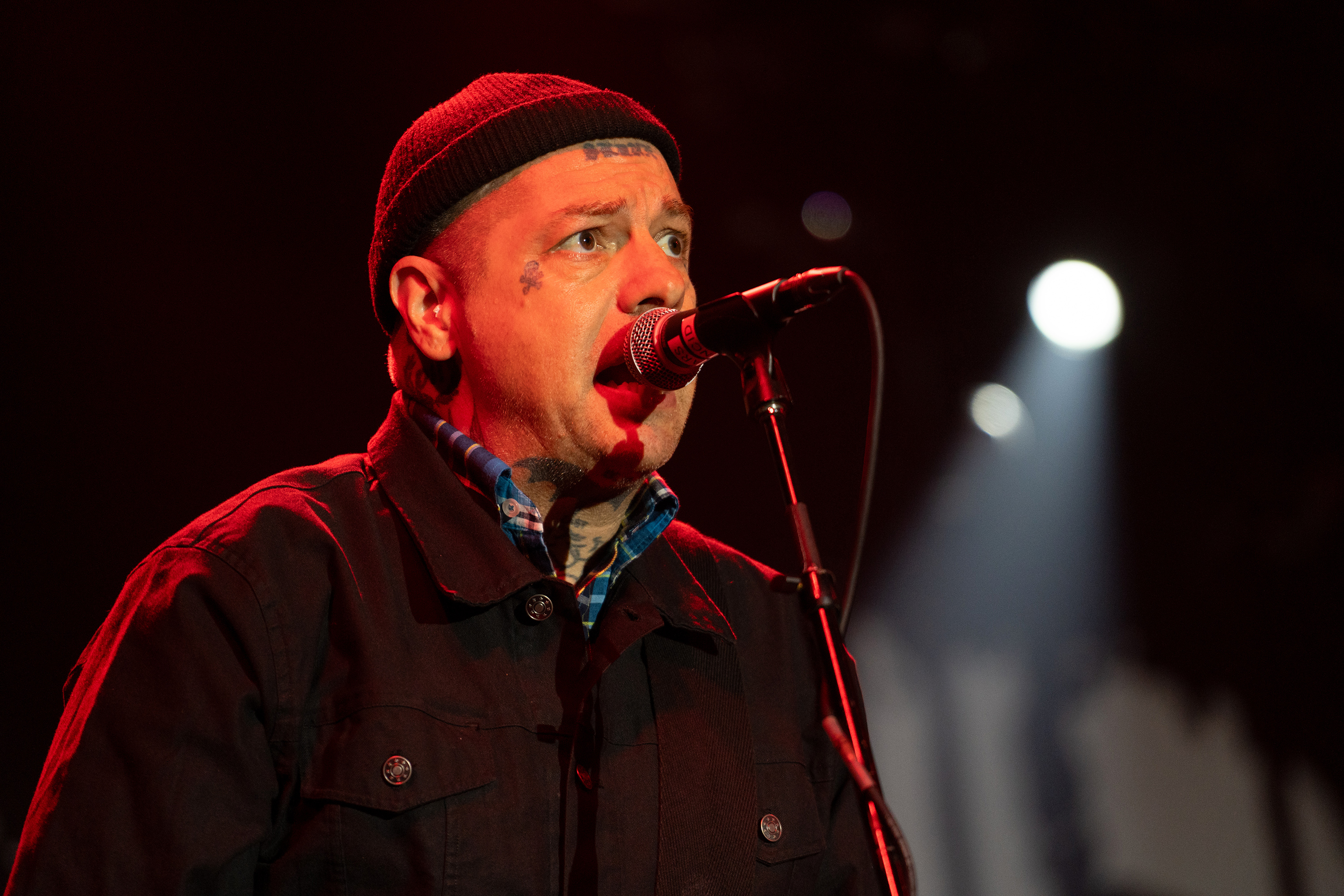
Frederiksen at Hellfest 2023

During the 2010s Frederiksen started another side project called Oxley’s Midnight Runners is the new band of Mike Oxley (Fatskins) along with Dave and Jeff (90 Proof). Their debut EP We Are Legion was released in 2014, they have since gone on to release six more EP’s.

Frederiksen is also a member of the Oi! band Stomper 98 alongside Sebi, Tommi Tox, Holgi Stomper, Sille Riot, and Stefan H. The first album with Frederiksen, Althergebracht, was released in 2018.

Frederiksen appears in several episodes of Tim Armstrong's Tim Timebomb's Rock n Roll Theater as Dante. Lars can also be seen in the documentary film The Other F Word.

During an appearance on the Wrestling Perspective Podcast, Lars suggested to Ruby Riott she should use the ring name Ruby Soho and assured her that he could also have the song cleared legally for her to use as her entrance theme. The name change was confirmed via a post on her Instagram account.

In 2021 Frederiksen released an Ep titled To Victory, which was made up of acoustic reworkings of songs he recorded with The Old Firm Casuals and Lars Frederiksen & The Bastards, along with covers of songs from KISS and U.K. Subs. From March 29, 2022, April 30, he went on a US solo tour in support of the Ep release.

Frederiksen voiced Steve Apparent in the 2006 stop motion film Live Freaky! Die Freaky!, he also played Volsung in the 2024 horror film The After Dark.

On April 20, 2024, at TNA Rebellion Frederiksen served as the manager for the TNA Knockouts World Tag Team Champions, Jody Threat and Dani Luna, during their match vs Decay.

== Gear and Influences ==
Inspired by the likes of Ace Frehley of Kiss, Frederiksen originally used a Les Paul until having back surgery in 2000. He stated "When you’re doing hour-and-a-half sets, jumping around like a moron, there’s a lot of stress that you accumulate over the years, Hence, why I had to have back surgery at the age of 29 — because I was jumping around with a 50-pound Les Paul on my shoulder every night for ten years." He now uses his own signature ESP LTD Volsung DCS with EMG DMF pickups.

He has cited some of his most impactful riffs as "Gone Shootin" by AC/DC and "Parasite" by KISS. Individual guitarist he is influenced by includes Eddie Clarke, Phil Campbell and Colin "Jock" Blyth.

== Personal life ==
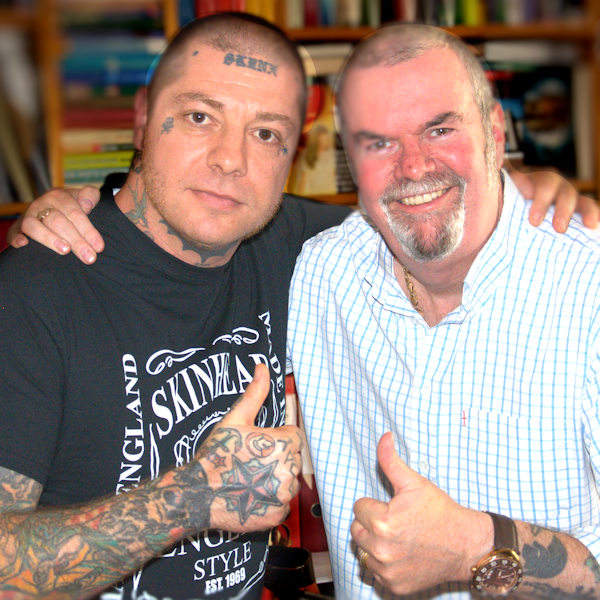
Frederiksen with journalist Garry Bushell in 2014

Frederiksen married his girlfriend Megan in 1998. They divorced, and he married San Francisco yoga instructor Stephanie Snyder, with whom he had two children, both boys. In May 2020, Stephanie divorced Frederiksen. In 2023, Frederiksen married publicist and writer Joanna Riedl, who took his last name.

On the 75th episode of That One Time on Tour podcast that aired on October 15, 2019, Frederiksen mentioned that he "always liked the idea of a big family," and that he "plans to have more kids at some point in [his] life" and would be open to adoption.

Frederiksen's brother was Robert "Rob" Dapello, a writer for Zero Magazine and a fellow musician, who died in February 2001 from a fatal brain aneurysm. The song "Otherside" off Rancid's 2003 album, Indestructible, is dedicated to Rob's memory. They were raised in Campbell, California, a city bordering San Jose.

He supports Millwall Football Club, and often has the Millwall lion on his guitar. He is also a San Jose Earthquakes season ticket holder. In January 2014, Lars and the Old Firm Casuals wrote the new team anthem/theme song for the San Jose Earthquakes, titled "Never Say Die". Lars called the team the "punkest" team in MLS. Frederiksen is also a fan of the Las Vegas Raiders and Oakland Athletics.

Frederiksen was involved with San Francisco's Project Homeless Connect, partnering with Tony Hawk to donate skateboards to teenagers in the family shelter.

"It was emotional," said Frederiksen, who says he was reminded of his mother's struggles as a single parent. "But I was thinking that when people donate toys, it is always the teenagers that get left out. That's when I got Tony Hawk on the phone."

Frederiksen is a longtime fan of professional wrestling. He is friends with professional wrestler CM Punk, and featured in the WWE produced documentary CM Punk: Best in the World.

== Discography ==
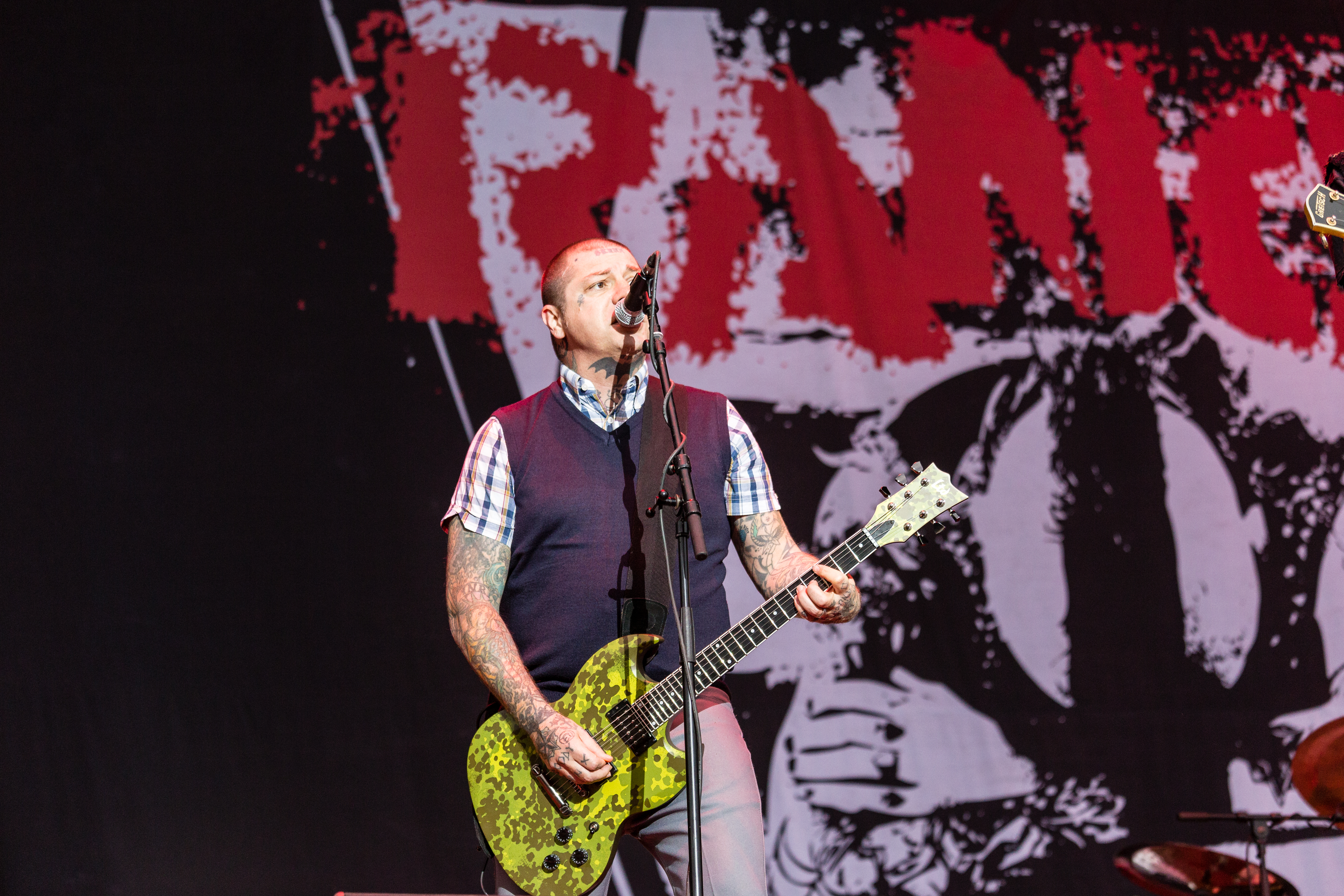
Frederiksen with Rancid in 2017

=== Rancid ===
Frederiksen on guitar and vocals.

- Radio Radio Radio (1993)
- Let's Go (1994)
- ...And Out Come the Wolves (1995)
- Life Won't Wait (1998)
- Rancid (2000)
- BYO Split Series Volume III (2002)
- Indestructible (2003)
- B Sides and C Sides (2008)
- Let the Dominoes Fall (2009)
- Honor Is All We Know (2014)
- Trouble Maker (2017)
- Tomorrow Never Comes (2023)

=== Lars Frederiksen and the Bastards ===
Frederiksen on guitar and vocals.

- Lars Frederiksen and the Bastards (2001)
- Viking (2004)
- Switchblade (EP)(Rancid Records, 2006)

=== The Old Firm Casuals ===
Frederiksen on guitar and vocals.

- The Old Firm Casuals S/T (7-inch) (Oi! the Boat Records 2011)
- We Want The Lions Share (7-inch) (Randale Records 2011)
- The Last Resort / The Old Firm Casuals (Split Double 7-inch) (Oi! the Boat Records 2011)
- Army of One (7-inch) (Oi! the Boat Records 2011)
- Oi! This Is Streetpunk Vol. 1 (11" Various Artists Compilation) (Pirates Press Records 2011)
- Them Against Us (Split 7-inch w/ Insane Dogs) (Randale Records 2012)
- Hooligan Classics Vol. 1 (Split Double 7-inch w/ The Chosen Ones, On File, Control) (Randale Records 2012)
- Stesso Sangue (Split 7-inch w/ Klasse Kriminale) (Randale Records 2012)
- Oi! Rules...OK! (Split 7-inch w/ Evil Conduct) (Randale Records 2012)
- Red White & Blue: Which One Are You? (Split Double 7-inch w/ Harrington Saints, Argy Bargy, Booze & Glory) (Pirates Press Records 2012)
- Oi! Ain't Dead (Split CD/LP w/ Razorblade, The Corps, Booze & Glory) (Rebellion Records 2012)
- Born Criminal (7-inch) (TKO Records 2012)
- Respect Your Roots Worldwide (CD Various Artists Compilation) (Strength Records 2012)
- United We Stand: The Front Lines of American Street Punk (2×LP Various Artists Compilation) (Durty Mick Records 2013)
- Hooligan Classics Vol. 2 (Split double 7-inch w/ Stomper 98, Iron Cross, The Gonads, and The Resort Bootboys*) (Randale Records 2013) *Resort Bootboys are The Old Firm Casuals with Roi Pierce of Last Resort on vocals
- The Old Firm Casuals/ The Headliners split EP (Split 7-inch) (UVPR Records 2013)
- For The Love of it All... (Double LP compilation of all previous releases except first 7-inch) (Oi! the Boat Records/Randale Records 2013)
- EP+1 (The band's first EP plus bonus track of Madball cover "Pride" on CD) (Rebellion Records 2013)
- Yuletide Cheers & Oi! (Split X-Mas 7-inch w/ Evil Conduct) (Randale Records 2013)
- Never Say Die (San Jose Earthquakes Anthem on blue 7-inch) (Volsung Records 2014)
- Perry Boys b/w Watford Tuxedo (7-inch) (Oi! the Boat Records/Randale Records, 2014)
- This Means War (Debut LP) (Oi! the Boat Records/Randale Records, 2014)
- Oi! Ain't Dead Vol. 3 (Split 7-inch w/ Noi!se, Razorblade, Badlands) (Rebellion Records, 2014)
- A Butcher's Banquet (7 song EP) (Oi The Boat/Randale Records, 2016)
- Sheer Terror/Old Firm Casuals (Split 7-inch EP) (PitchforkNY Records, 2016)
- Wartime Rock N Roll EP (12-inch etched vinyl/CD) (Rebellion Records, 2017)
- Holger Danske (LP) (Demons Run Amok Entertainment/Pirates Press Records, 2019)

=== Oxley's Midnight Runners ===
Frederiksen on guitar and backing vocals.

- We Are Legion, 7-inch record (Oi! the Boat Records 2014)
- Invasion, 7-inch record (Oi! the Boat Records 2015)
- Combat, 7-inch record (Oi! the Boat Records 2015)
- Conquest, 7-inch record (Oi! the Boat Records 2016)
- "American Made" (Side B, Song 7), Oi! Ain't Dead Volume 5, various artists compilation LP, (Rebellion Records 2016)
- Furies, 7-inch record (Crowd Control Media/Randale Records 2018)

=== Stomper 98 ===
Frederiksen on guitar and backing vocals.

- Althergebracht LP (Contra Records 2018)

- stomper 98 (s98 records 2023)

=== Tim Timebomb and Friends ===
Frederiksen on guitar and vocals.

- Tim Timebomb and Friends (2012)

=== As a producer ===
- ...And Out Come the Wolves (1995) by Rancid (co-produced)
- The Streets of San Francisco (1995) by Swingin' Utters
- The Truth, The Whole Truth And Nothing But The Truth (1997) by The Business
- East Los Presents (1997) by Union 13
- Class Separation (1997) by The Forgotten
- Pandemonium (1997) by Powerhouse
- No Regrets (1997) by Powerhouse
- Life Won't Wait (1998) by Rancid (co-produced)
- The Spidey Sessions 1995 (1998) by Redemption 87
- All Guns Poolside! (1998) by Redemption 87
- Do or Die (1998) by Dropkick Murphys
- Youth on the Street (1998) by Pressure Point
- Veni Vidi Vici (1998) by The Forgotten
- The Gang's All Here (1999) by Dropkick Murphys
- Riot, Riot, Upstart (1999) by Agnostic Front
- Cross to Bear (1999) by Pressure Point
- Underneath the Underground (1999) by Anti-Heros
- The Answer to Your Problems? (1999) by Marky Ramone and the Intruders
- We the People (2000) by Patriot
- Hellbound and Heartless (2006) by The Heart Attacks
- The Forgotten (2008) by The Forgotten
- Pride & Tradition (2012) by Harrington Saints

== Notes ==
- Davies, Mike. "The Lock Up", BBC. Audio interview with Lars Frederiksen, requires RealPlayer. (February 16, 2005)
- Cummins, Johnson. "Lars Frederiksen takes stock of his hard knocks", The Montreal Mirror. (December 2, 2004)
- Ashare, Matt "Pretty in punk: Rancid's Lars Frederiksen steps forward", The Boston Phoenix. (March 15–22, 2001)
