= Tomorrow Never Comes (Rancid album) =

Studio album by Rancid
- Released: June 2, 2023
- Studios: Ship-Rec, Los Angeles, California
- Genre: Punk rock
- Length: 28:47
- Labels: Hellcat; Epitaph
- Producer: Brett Gurewitz

Rancid chronology
Trouble Maker (2017)	Tomorrow Never Comes (2023)

Singles from Tomorrow Never Comes
- 1. "Tomorrow Never Comes" Released: April 18, 2023; 2. "Don't Make Me Do It" Released: May 2, 2023; 3. "Devil in Disguise" Released: May 24, 2023; 4. "New American" Released: June 2, 2023; 5. "Live Forever" Released: September 6, 2023

Tomorrow Never Comes is the tenth studio album by the American punk rock band Rancid, released on June 2, 2023. It marks the band's first album in six years since 2017's Trouble Maker.

It was preceded by the singles and music videos for "Tomorrow Never Comes", "Don't Make Me Do It" and "Devil in Disguise". "New American" and "Live Forever" were released as singles and music videos. It is Rancid's shortest album to date at 28 minutes and 47 seconds.

The vinyl version swaps tracks 1 and 5 on side A making "The Bloody & Violent History" the opening song instead of the title track.

== Background ==
On April 18, 2023, Rancid announced Tomorrow Never Comes release date marking their first release since 2017 Trouble Maker. Like most of the band's albums, Tomorrow Never Comes is produced by Bad Religion guitarist Brett Gurewitz. It is also their first album since Rancid 5 to not have any ska influenced songs.

== Release and promotion ==
The albums first single the title track "Tomorrow Never Comes" was released on April18, 2023, and was occupied by an official music video. The second single "Don’t Make Me Do It" was released on May 2, along with a music video directed by frontman Tim Armstrong and Kevin Kerslake featuring VFX by Jason Link. This was followed by the third single "Devil in Disguise" which was released on May 24, and like the other previous singles a music video was made for the song. Two more music videos were later produced for the songs "New America", and "Live Forever."

Tomorrow Never Comes was officially released on June 2, 2023, in the US it debuted with 9600 equivalent album units sold, 8500 of which came from album sales such as CD, LP, and paid digital downloads. The album peaked at No. 126 on Billboard 200, No. 9 on Album Sales, No. 3 on Current Alternative, No. 5 on Current Rock, No. 9 on Vinyl Albums and No. 18 on Independent albums. Internationally it peaked the highest in Germany at No. 12.

In support of the album Rancid went on a EU/UK tour which took place from June 2 to the 25. They also played two shows at Citizens House of Blues in Boston, Massachusetts on September 18, and 19, 2023.

== Critical reception ==
Professional ratings
Aggregate scores
Source	Rating
Metacritic	78/100
Review scores
Source	Rating
AllMusic	3.5/5 stars
Distorted Sound	9/10
Ghost Cult	8/10
Kerrang!	4/5 stars
Louder Than War	4/5 stars
Punknews.org	4/5 stars
Punk Rock Theory	9/10
ThePunkSite.com	3.5/5 stars
Wall of Sound	7/10

Tomorrow Never Comes was met with positive reception from critics and has a 78% on Metacritic.

Tim Sendra of AllMusic wrote "Tomorrow Never Comes is a spiritual descendant of their self-titled album from 23 years earlier, where the band sidelined their usual bouncing ska tunes and street-tough ballads, as well as any traces of grandeur and subtlety, for a nonstop blast of fast and furious punk." Ian Winwood of Kerrang! stated "Despite it being many a long year since Rancid were capable of issuing surprises, Tomorrow Never Comes is more of a delight than really it has any right to be. Certainly, it’s a good deal more compelling than any of its authors’ more recent albums. Running at a svelte 28-minutes plus change, and featuring only five songs that breach the two-minute barrier, this aerodynamic offering comes trimmed of fat and filler."

John Gentile of Punk News added "if it’s exactly like wolves, then it will pale in comparison. If it’s totally different, then it’s “not Rancid.” Here, Rancid don’t redefine themselves, but they show that there is a lot of life in some of their lesser explored aspects. Simply, this is the band’s best record since Rancid 5. So, for the next LP, can they pull a Rancid 5 again?."

== Track listing ==
All tracks are written by Rancid.

Tomorrow Never Comes track listing
No.	Title	Lead vocals	Length
1.	"Tomorrow Never Comes"	Armstrong, Frederiksen, Freeman	2:26
2.	"Mud, Blood, & Gold"	Armstrong, Frederiksen, Freeman	1:12
3.	"Devil in Disguise"	Armstrong	1:58
4.	"New American"	Armstrong	2:37
5.	"The Bloody & Violent History"	Armstrong, Frederiksen, Freeman	2:14
6.	"Don't Make Me Do It"	Armstrong	0:58
7.	"It's a Road to Righteousness"	Armstrong	2:18
8.	"Live Forever"	Armstrong	1:21
9.	"Drop Dead Inn"	Frederiksen	2:01
10.	"Prisoners Song"	Armstrong, Frederiksen, Freeman	2:21
11.	"Magnificent Rogue"	Frederiksen	1:25
12.	"One Way Ticket"	Armstrong	1:50
13.	"Hellbound Train"	Armstrong	1:25
14.	"Eddie the Butcher"	Armstrong	1:34
15.	"Hear Us Out"	Armstrong	1:26
16.	"When the Smoke Clears"	Armstrong	1:39
Total length:			28:45

Japanese bonus track
No.	Title	Length
17.	"So Long Eddy"	2:16

== Personnel ==
Rancid

- Tim Armstrong – guitar, vocals, artwork, layout
- Lars Frederiksen – guitar, vocals
- Matt Freeman – bass, vocals
- Branden Steineckert – drums

Additional personnel

- Brett Gurewitz – background vocals, producer
- TJ Rivera – engineering, mixing
- Sergio Chavez – engineering assistant
- Ted Jensen – mastering
- Anders Aho – studio technician
- Mike Fasano – studio technician
- J Bonner – artwork, layout

== Charts ==
Chart performance for Tomorrow Never Comes
Chart (2023)	Peak position
Australian Albums (ARIA)	51
Belgian Albums (Ultratop Flanders)	159
French Physical Albums (SNEP)	67
Finnish Albums (Suomen virallinen lista)	49
German Albums (Offizielle Top 100)	12
Japanese Albums (Oricon)	25
Japanese Digital Albums (Oricon)	34
Japanese Rock Albums (Oricon)	5
Japanese Hot Albums (Billboard Japan)	23
Scottish Albums (Official Charts)	15
Swiss Albums (Schweizer Hitparade)	84
UK Albums (Official Charts)	86
UK Independent Albums (Official Charts)	7
US Billboard 200	126
US Top Rock Albums (Billboard)	20
US Independent Albums (Billboard)	18
US Vinyl Albums (Billboard)	9
