= Life Won't Wait =

Studio album by Rancid
- Released: June 30, 1998
- Recorded: 1997–1998
- Studios: Sunset; Bloodclot; Brooklyn; NRG; Ocean Way; Record Plant; The Complex; American Sector; Penthouse; Coyote; The Site
- Genres: Punk rock, ska punk, reggae
- Length: 64:13
- Label: Epitaph
- Producers: Tim Armstrong, Lars Frederiksen

Rancid chronology
...And Out Come the Wolves (1995)	Life Won't Wait (1998)	Rancid (2000)

Singles from Life Won't Wait
- 1. "Bloodclot" Released: June 1, 1998; 2. "Hooligans" Released: 1998

Life Won't Wait is the fourth studio album by the American punk rock band Rancid. It was released on June 30, 1998, through Epitaph Records. It was released as the follow-up to ...And Out Come the Wolves (1995).

== Writing and production ==
Around early 1997, still riding high off of the success of ...And Out Come the Wolves, Rancid decided to immediately enter the studio following the ...And Out Come the Wolves tour to record the next album. The recording of Life Won't Wait took place in the United States (from San Francisco to Los Angeles, New York City, New Orleans) and Jamaica. Two of the songs were recorded in Kingston: "Hoover Street" and the title track, "Life Won't Wait". With the cooperation of numerous Jamaican reggae artists (such as Buju Banton) is very distinctive on this album, not just in the vocals, but also in instrumental parts, which all makes Life Won't Wait very different from most of the other Rancid releases. It is also the only album to date not to feature producer/engineer Brett Gurewitz in any capacity, with Armstrong and Frederiksen opting to produce it themselves. However, as Armstrong noted during his appearance on the podcast One Life, One Chance with Toby Morse, Gurewitz sequenced the album.

During the writing process the band had recorded over 50 songs, many still unreleased. For the album, Brett Gurewitz helped pick the songs to be on the record and also help sequence the final album. "Little Rude Girl" as recorded, but ended up being a song on Lars Frederiksen & the Bastards album. Some of the released non-album tracks ended up on singles, compilations, and the B Sides and C Sides collections. The song "Emelia" was co-written by Vic Ruggiero and recorded during these sessions. The song was later re-written and featured on Vic's first solo album in 2001. The cover photo pays homage to John Lennon's Rock 'n' roll and Neil Young's After the Gold Rush cover designs.

== Release and promotion ==
"Bloodclot" and "Hooligans" were released as the album's singles along with music videos for each song while "Who Would've Thought", which also had a music video, was released as a promotional only single. Music videos for "Backslide", "Crane Fist" and "Leicester Square" were also released. "Bloodclot" went on to reach number 98 on the UK singles chart, "Hooligans" also went on to reach number 162 on the chart.

Life Won't Wait was released on June 30, 1998, and was the last Rancid album for 16 years to be released through Epitaph Records until Honor Is All We Know (2014). After its release, the band moved to frontman Tim Armstrong's label (a sub-label of Epitaph), Hellcat Records, who released their next album, 2000's Rancid. Although not as successful as ...And Out Come the Wolves, the album peaked at number 35 on the Billboard 200 album chart, making it one of Rancid's highest ranking albums, internationally it charted higher in the UK peaking at number 32.

== Reception ==
Professional ratings
Review scores
Source	Rating
AllMusic	3.5/5 stars
Christgau's Consumer Guide	A−
The Encyclopedia of Popular Music	3/5 stars
Pitchfork	7.0/10
Rolling Stone	4/5 stars
Select	3/5 medals
Spin	7/10
Ultimate Guitar	7.7/10

The album was met with positive reception. Stephen Thomas Erlewine of AllMusic described the album as having a ska influence. He praised the music as a "powerful slice of old-school punk — as powerful as any of their records" and claims "it actually sounds a lot like ...And Out Come the Wolves". Kevin Ruggeri of Pitchfork added "Although Rancid may have substituted some of their intensity for the sake of musical growth, the changes seem sincere and natural rather than the result of a mainstream- minded compromise. Rancid may be far from being "the only band that matters," but as Life Won't Wait suggests, they're more than willing to fight for the title." A reviewer from Ultimate Guitar wrote "This album is completely different from much of Rancid's music. Life Won't Wait is much more experimental which attributes to their continual comparison to The Clash and their sound. The over all sound involves Reggie, ska, many additions of brass instruments and in the last track, "Coppers" steel drums."

The album won Outstanding Punk/Ska Album at the 1999 California Music Awards.

== Track listing ==
All tracks are written by Tim Armstrong, except where noted.

No.	Title	Lead vocals	Length
1.	"Intro"		0:48
2.	"Bloodclot" (written by Armstrong, Lars Frederiksen)	Frederiksen	2:45
3.	"Hoover Street"	Armstrong	4:10
4.	"Black Lung"	Armstrong	1:53
5.	"Life Won't Wait" (written by Armstrong, Frederiksen, Vic Ruggiero, Buju Banton)	Frederiksen, Armstrong, Banton	3:48
6.	"New Dress" (written by Armstrong, Frederiksen)	Frederiksen	2:51
7.	"Warsaw"	Armstrong	1:31
8.	"Hooligans" (written by Armstrong, Frederiksen, Ruggiero)	Frederiksen	2:33
9.	"Crane Fist" (written by Armstrong, Frederiksen)	Frederiksen, Armstrong	3:48
10.	"Leicester Square" (written by Armstrong, Frederiksen)	Frederiksen	2:35
11.	"Backslide"	Armstrong	2:54
12.	"Who Would've Thought"	Armstrong	2:57
13.	"Cash, Culture and Violence"	Armstrong	3:10
14.	"Cocktails"	Armstrong	3:21
15.	"The Wolf"	Frederiksen, Armstrong	2:39
16.	"1998" (written by Armstrong, Howie Pyro)	Armstrong	2:46
17.	"Lady Liberty" (written by Armstrong, Frederiksen)	Frederiksen	2:20
18.	"Wrongful Suspicion" (written by Armstrong, Ruggiero)	Armstrong	3:32
19.	"Turntable"	Armstrong	2:17
20.	"Something in the World Today" (written by Armstrong, Frederiksen)	Frederiksen	2:34
21.	"Corazón de Oro"	Armstrong	3:59
22.	"Coppers" (Armstrong, Frederiksen, Dr. Israel)	Frederiksen, Armstrong, Dr. Israel	5:02

Japanese bonus track
No.	Title	Length
23.	"Things to Come"	3:14
Total length:		64:00

== Personnel ==
- Tim Armstrong – vocals, guitar, producer, engineer, mixing, cover photo
- Lars Frederiksen – vocals, guitar, engineer, producer, cover photo
- Matt Freeman – bass guitar
- Brett Reed – drums

=== Additional musicians ===
- Buju Banton – additional vocals on track 5
- Dicky Barrett – additional vocals on tracks 4 and 13
- Billie Joe Armstrong – backing vocals (Hey Hos) on track 2
- Lester Butler – harmonica on track 1
- Roddy Byers – guitar on track 8
- Simon Chardiet – guitar on track 19
- Alex Désert – backing vocals on track 3
- DJ Q-Maxx 420 (Marq Lyn) – backing vocals on track 6
- Santa Fazio – harmonica on track 14
- Lynval Golding – additional vocals on track 8
- Dave Hillyard – saxophone on tracks 11 and 18
- Dr. Israel – vocals on track 22
- Thomas Johnson – percussion on track 12
- Kristin Krisapline – gang vocals on track 2
- Ollie Lattgenau – backing vocals on tracks 10 and 15
- Greg Lee – backing vocals on track 3
- Roger Miret – backing vocals on track 20
- Mark Mullins – trombone on tracks 11 and 18
- Stephen Perkins – steel drums on track 22
- Howie Pyro – gang vocals on track 2
- Marky Ramone – gang vocals on track 2
- Vic Ruggiero – B3 organ on tracks 5, 8–9, 11, 13, 18, 21, piano on 5, 9, 12, 14, 18, 21, percussion on 5 and 18, guitar on 12
- Jamil Sharif – trumpet on tracks 11 and 18
- Neville Staple – additional vocals on track 8
- Tim Shaw – gang vocals on track 2
- Eric Stefani – piano on track 3
- Will Wheaton – backing vocals on tracks 11 and 21

=== Production ===
- Thomas Johnson (music producer) – percussion, engineer, mixing
- Bob Ludwig – mastering
- Jerry Finn – mixing
- Jim Albert – engineering
- Robi Banerji – engineering
- Albert Cayati – engineering
- Michael "Cooley" Cooper – engineering
- Kevin Dena – engineering
- John Ewing Jr. – engineering
- Grace Falconer – engineering
- Lior Goldenberg – engineering
- Cappy Japngie – engineering
- Walter Mauceri – engineering
- Spencer Ledyard – engineering
- Steve Mixdorf – engineering
- Jonathan Mooney – engineering
- Michael Penketh - engineering
- Ronnie Rivera – engineering
- Michael Rosen – engineering
- Kevin Smith – engineering
- Rohan "Jimjay" Stephens – engineering
- Claus Trelby – engineering
- John Tyree – engineering
- Howard Willing – engineering
- Joe Zook – engineering
- Jesse Fischer – artwork, photography

== Charts ==
Chart (1998)	Peak position
Australian Albums (ARIA)	41
Finnish Albums (Suomen virallinen lista)	40
New Zealand Albums (RMNZ)	46
Scottish Albums (OCC)	49
UK Albums (OCC)	32
UK Physical Albums (OCC)	32
UK Rock & Metal Albums (OCC)	1
UK Independent Albums (OCC)	1
US Billboard 200	35
