= Trouble Maker (album) =

Studio album by Rancid
- Released: June 9, 2017
- Recorded: December 2015 – January 2017
- Studio: Big Bad Sound; Sunset Sound; Red Star (Los Angeles, CA)
- Genre: Punk rock; ska punk
- Length: 36:26
- Label: Hellcat; Epitaph
- Producer: Brett Gurewitz

Rancid chronology
Honor Is All We Know (2014)	Trouble Maker (2017)	Tomorrow Never Comes (2023)

Singles from Trouble Maker
- 1. "Ghost of a Chance" Released: May 2, 2017; 2. "Bovver Rock and Roll" Released: June 8, 2017; 3. "Where I'm Going (promotional single)" Released: 2017

Trouble Maker is the ninth studio album by the American punk rock band Rancid, released on June 9, 2017. Like many of Rancid's albums, Trouble Maker was produced by Epitaph founder and Bad Religion guitarist Brett Gurewitz, and marks the band's first album since their 1993 self-titled debut to feature the original Rancid logo on the cover. The band recorded the album between December 2015 and January 2017 at Big Bad Sound, Sunset Sound, and Red Star.

The album was preceded by the first single and music video for "Ghost of a Chance". "Bovver Rock and Roll" was released as the album's second single. "Where I'm Going" was released as a promotional single. A music video was also made for "Telegraph Avenue".

== Background and recording ==
Originally Rancid intended to record an EPs worth of material in December 2015.

The tracks written solely by Tim Armstrong were meant for his second solo album which was recorded with Matt Freeman on bass and Joey Castillo on drums. Upon hearing the tracks Brett Gurewitz suggested Rancid go back into the studio and use these towards a new Rancid album.

== Critical reception ==
Professional ratings
Aggregate scores
Source	Rating
Metacritic	69/100
Review scores
Source	Rating
AllMusic	2.5/5 stars
Consequence of Sound	B
Drowned in Sound	7/10
Pitchfork	7.3/10
PopMatters	5/10
Record Collector	4/5 stars

Trouble Maker was met with generally favorable reviews from music critics. At Metacritic, which assigns a normalized rating out of 100 to reviews from mainstream publications, the album received an average score of 69, based on ten reviews.

Shane Baldwin of Record Collector praised the album, writing: "Trouble Maker is up there with their best". Dan Weiss of Consequence of Sound wrote: "there's no formal breakthroughs on Trouble Maker beyond the astounding economy, unless you think the harmonica on "Buddy" or Clash-goes-"Ring of Fire" chords on "Telegraph Avenue" makes this the band's folk-punk album". Zoe Camp of Pitchfork resumed: "while Trouble Maker doesn't usurp the band's primordial peak, it's far and wide their strongest effort since 2000's excellent self-titled". Nick Roseblade of Drowned in Sound called the album "a return to force for Rancid, and is the musical equivalent of a football team winning a major trophy after years in the wilderness and the absolute elation that comes with that. However there is a downside", and added "Rancid could have released Trouble Maker at any point since they began".

In mixed reviews, AllMusic's Tim Sendra stated: "like their disappointing 2014 album ...Honor Is All We Know, Trouble Maker is the sound of a band going through the motions, telling the same stories over and over, bashing out the same riffs, and ultimately not connecting any punches". John Paul of PopMatters found the album "more of the same; retreads of staid ideas, sounds and themes better suited to teenage ennui".

== Track listing ==
No.	Title	Writer(s)	Lead vocals	Length
1.	"Track Fast"	Rancid	Armstrong, Freeman	0:58
2.	"Ghost of a Chance"	Armstrong	Armstrong	1:36
3.	"Telegraph Avenue"	Armstrong	Armstrong	3:19
4.	"An Intimate Close Up of a Street Punk Trouble Maker"	Armstrong	Armstrong	2:34
5.	"Where I'm Going"	Rancid	Frederiksen, Armstrong	2:23
6.	"Buddy"	Armstrong	Armstrong	3:03
7.	"Farewell Lola Blue"	Armstrong	Armstrong, Frederiksen	2:26
8.	"All American Neighborhood"	Rancid	Armstrong	1:13
9.	"Bovver Rock and Roll"	Rancid	Armstrong, Frederiksen	3:02
10.	"Make It Out Alive"	Rancid	Armstrong, Frederiksen	1:50
11.	"Molly Make Up Your Mind"	Armstrong	Armstrong	1:12
12.	"I Got Them Blues Again"	Armstrong	Armstrong	1:48
13.	"Beauty of the Pool Hall"	Armstrong	Armstrong	2:15
14.	"Say Goodbye to Our Heroes"	Rancid	Armstrong	2:10
15.	"I Kept a Promise"	Armstrong	Armstrong	2:58
16.	"Cold Cold Blood"	Rancid	Armstrong	1:42
17.	"This Is Not the End"	Armstrong	Armstrong	1:57
Total length:				36:26

Deluxe edition bonus tracks
No.	Title	Writer(s)	Lead vocals	Length
18.	"We Arrived Right on Time"	Rancid	Armstrong	2:20
19.	"Go on Rise Up"	Armstrong	Armstrong	2:23
Total length:				41:09

Japanese edition
No.	Title	Writer(s)	Lead vocals	Length
18.	"We Arrived Right on Time"	Rancid	Armstrong	2:20
19.	"Go on Rise Up"	Armstrong	Armstrong	2:23
20.	"Never Forget Us"		Armstrong	2:43

== Personnel ==
Adapted from the album liner notes.

Rancid

- Tim Armstrong – guitar, vocals
- Lars Frederiksen – guitar, vocals
- Matt Freeman – bass, vocals
- Branden Steineckert – drums, backing vocals

Studio musicians

- Kevin Bivona – piano, Hammond B3 organ, melodica
- Brett Gurewitz – additional backing vocals
- Skinhead Rob – additional backing vocals
- Michael Shultz – additional backing vocals
- The Interrupters – additional backing vocals

Technical

- Brett Gurewitz – producer
- Kevin Bivona – engineer
- Clinton Welander – engineer
- Zach Fisher – assistant engineer
- Andrew Scheps – mixing
- Eric Boulanger – mastering
- Jett Galindo – mastering assistant
- Tim Armstrong – artwork, layout
- Jason A. Bonner – artwork, layout
- Ernie Parada – artwork, layout

== Charts ==
Chart (2017)	Peak position
Australian Albums (ARIA)	41
Austrian Albums (Ö3 Austria)	33
Belgian Albums (Ultratop Flanders)	60
Belgian Albums (Ultratop Wallonia)	142
Canadian Albums (Billboard)	55
German Albums (Offizielle Top 100)	21
Italian Albums (FIMI)	73
New Zealand Heatseekers Albums (RMNZ)	4
Scottish Albums (OCC)	25
Swiss Albums (Schweizer Hitparade)	38
UK Albums (OCC)	57
US Billboard 200	23
US Independent Albums (Billboard)	1
US Top Alternative Albums (Billboard)	2
US Top Rock Albums (Billboard)	4
US Vinyl Albums (Billboard)	1
