= Midnight Madness and Beyond =

Studio album by GBH
- Released: 1986
- Studios: Strawberry Studios, Stockport
- Genres: Hardcore punk, street punk
- Labels: Captain Oi!, Rough Justice

GBH chronology
City Babys Revenge (1984)	Midnight Madness and Beyond (1986)	No Need to Panic (1987)

Midnight Madness and Beyond is the third album by UK82 Hardcore punk band GBH from Birmingham, UK. It was released in August 1986 on the Rough Justice label (the band's first release for their new label, following the departure from Clay Records) with catalogue number Just 2. Recorded once again at Strawberry Studios in Stockport UK. It was later Re-released with additional tracks (the "Oh No It's GBH Again" EP) in 2002 by leading Punk reissue label Captain Oi! (Ahoy CD 193)

== Track listing ==
1. Limpwristed
2. Future Fugitives
3. Too Much
4. Iroquois
5. Guns & Guitars
6. Horror Story
7. Midnight Madness and Beyond
8. Chance For Living
9. The Seed of Madness
10. Sam Is Your Leader
11. How Come
12. Blood

Bonus Tracks "Oh No It's GBH Again" EP

1. Malice in Wonderland
2. Lost in The Fog
3. Get Out of The City
4. Company Of Wolves
