= Lars Frederiksen and the Bastards (album) =

2001 album by Lars Frederiksen and the Bastards

Studio album by Lars Frederiksen and the Bastards
- Released: March 6, 2001 (EU); March 20, 2001 (US)
- Recorded: 2000–2001
- Genres: Street punk; punk rock
- Length: 34:15
- Label: Hellcat
- Producer: Tim Armstrong

Lars Frederiksen and the Bastards chronology
Lars Frederiksen and the Bastards (2001)	Viking (2004)

Professional ratings
Review scores
Source	Rating
AllMusic	4/5 stars
Robert Christgau	A−
The Kill Times	(6/6)

Lars Frederiksen and the Bastards is the debut studio album by the American punk rock band Lars Frederiksen and the Bastards. It was released on March 20, 2001 via Hellcat Records. The album peaked at #26 on the Independent Albums and #49 on the Heatseekers Albums.

All of the songs were written by lead singer/guitarist Lars Frederiksen and his Rancid bandmate Tim Armstrong, with the exception of two covers, Billy Bragg's "To Have and to Have Not" and Eddie Holland's "Leavin Here".

The song "Dead American" was used by wrestler Vampiro as his entrance music on his independent circuit.

== Track listing ==
No.	Title	Writer(s)	Length
1.	"Intro"	L. Frederiksen; T. Armstrong	0:13
2.	"Dead American"	L. Frederiksen; T. Armstrong	2:06
3.	"Six Foot Five"	L. Frederiksen; T. Armstrong	2:18
4.	"To Have and to Have Not" (Billy Bragg cover)	S.W. Bragg	2:46
5.	"Army of Zombies"	L. Frederiksen; T. Armstrong	2:39
6.	"Campbell, CA"	L. Frederiksen; T. Armstrong	2:17
7.	"Wine and Roses"	L. Frederiksen; T. Armstrong	3:21
8.	"Anti-Social"	L. Frederiksen; T. Armstrong	2:06
9.	"10 Plagues of Egypt"	L. Frederiksen; T. Armstrong	2:30
10.	"Leavin Here" (Eddie Holland cover)	L. Dozier; B. Holland; E. Holland	2:40
11.	"Subterranean"	L. Frederiksen; T. Armstrong	4:06
12.	"Skunx"	L. Frederiksen; T. Armstrong	3:06
13.	"Vietnam"	L. Frederiksen; T. Armstrong	4:07
Total length:			34:15

== Personnel ==
- Lars Frederiksen - songwriter, vocals, lead guitar, rhythm guitar, slide guitar
- Jason Woods - bass
- Gordy Carbone - backing vocals
- Scott Abels - drums, percussion
- Tim Armstrong - songwriter, additional guitar (track 11), producer, mixing engineer
- Dave Carlock - mixing engineer
- Gene Grimaldi - mastering
- Jesse Fischer - artwork
- Meagan Frederiksen - photography
- Brody Dalle - front cover photo
- Alicia Burwell - back cover photo

== Charts ==
Chart (2001)	Peak position
US Billboard Independent Albums	26
US Billboard Heatseekers Albums	49

== Release history ==
Region	Date	Format(s)	Label(s)
Europe	March 6, 2001	CD; LP; cassette	Hellcat Records
United States	March 20, 2001	CD; digital download; LP	Hellcat Records
Japan	March 23, 2001	CD; LP	Epitaph Records
