= Radio Radio Radio =

1993 extended play by Rancid

EP by Rancid
- Released: August 26, 1993
- Recorded: May – June 1993
- Studio: Westbeach Recorders in Hollywood
- Genre: Punk rock
- Length: 7:50
- Label: Fat Wreck Chords
- Producer: Donnell Cameron

Rancid chronology
Rancid (1993)	Radio Radio Radio (1993)	Let's Go (1994)

Professional ratings
Review scores
Source	Rating
AllMusic	4/5 stars

Radio Radio Radio is an EP by the American punk rock band Rancid. The EP was released on August 26, 1993, through Fat Wreck Chords with the catalog number FAT 509. It was also their only release on Fat Wreck Chords.

It is the first Rancid release with four members, with the inclusion of Lars Fredriksen on guitar and vocals. Previously a three-piece, Rancid was in need of a second guitar player to refine their sound. They had briefly performed live with Billie Joe Armstrong of Green Day as their second guitar player, but Billie Joe decided to stay with Green Day rather than become a full member of Rancid. "Radio" was written in the short time that Billie Joe was in the band, and he therefore was a co-writer of the song. After Billie Joe decided to leave, Frederiksen filled the spot. Frederiksen had previously been a member of the British punk rock band the U.K. Subs.

"Radio" and "Dope Sick Girl" were both re-recorded for the band's second album, Let's Go, which was released the next year. The versions on the EP, "Radio" in particular, are arranged differently than the versions on Let's Go.

Fat Wreck Chords reissued the EP on January 15, 2009, on white vinyl.

== Track listing ==
All tracks are written by Tim Armstrong and Matt Freeman, except where noted.

Side one
No.	Title	Length
1.	"Radio" (written by Tim Armstrong, Billie Joe Armstrong, Freeman)	2:06
2.	"Dope Sick Girl"	1:59
Total length:		4:05

Side two
No.	Title	Length
1.	"Just a Feeling"	1:56
2.	"Someone's Gonna Die" (written and originally performed by Blitz)	1:49
Total length:		3:45

== Notes ==
- "Just a Feeling" is misspelled on the record sleeve as "Just a Felling".
- The run-on grooves on sides A and B have "That's Alot [sic] of Radios" and "There's Two E's in Feeling" (a reference to the misspelling noted above) etched onto them, respectively.

== Personnel ==
- Tim Armstrong – lead vocals, guitar
- Matt Freeman – bass, backing vocals
- Lars Frederiksen – guitar, backing vocals
- Brett Reed – drums, backing vocals

Production

- Donnell Cameron – producer, recording
- Joe Peccerillo – recording
- Jessie Fischer – photography
