= Strange Itch =

Studio album by Strange Itch
- Released: 1998
- Recorded: 1998
- Genre: Punk rock
- Length: 48:49
- Label: Itch Records

Strange Itch is the eponymous debut album from the band Strange Itch. It was released independently in 1998

== Track listing ==
1. "Play with Me" – 2:28
2. "I'm Free" – 5:41
3. "SPF" – 4:19
4. "Pig" – 3:37
5. "Big Brother" – 2:29
6. "Unity" – 2:16
7. "Funky Scrumptious" – 1:40
8. "Sneeches" – 2:56
9. "A.D.D." – 3:45
10. "Perfect Words" – 6:42
11. "Chucklehead" – 10:45
12. "I Want a Girl" (hidden track) – 2:13

== Credits ==
- Jeph Howard – vocals
- Matt Brown – guitar
- Joel Pack – bass
- Branden Steineckert – drums
