= Shane Hurley =

Irish hurler

Personal information
- Native name: Seán Ó hUrthuile (Irish)
- Born: 1997 (age 28–29) Cork, Ireland
- Occupation: Student
- Height: 5 ft 10 in (178 cm)

Sport
- Sport: Hurling
- Position: Goalkeeper
Club
- Years: Club
- St Finbarr's
Club titles
- Cork titles: 1
College
- Years: College
- University College Cork
College titles
- Fitzgibbon titles: 2
Inter-county*
Years	County	Apps (scores)
2019-present	Cork	0 (0-00)
Inter-county titles
- Munster titles: 0
- All-Irelands: 0
- NHL: 0
- All Stars: 0
- *Inter County team apps and scores correct as of 15:54, 27 March 2019.

Shane Hurley (born 1997) is an Irish hurler who plays for Cork Senior Championship club St Finbarr's. He usually lines out as a goalkeeper.

== Honours ==
University College Cork

- Fitzgibbon Cup: 2019, 2020

St. Finbarr's

- Cork Premier Senior Hurling Championship: 2022

Cork

- All-Ireland Intermediate Hurling Championship: 2018
- Munster Under-21 Hurling Championship: 2018
