= City Babys Revenge =

City Baby's Revenge

Studio album by Charged GBH
- Released: 1984
- Recorded: 1982–1984
- Studio: Strawberry, Stockport
- Genre: Hardcore punk, street punk
- Length: 43:40
- Label: Captain Oi!, Clay
- Producer: Chris Nagle, Charged GBH

Charged GBH chronology
City Baby Attacked by Rats (1982)	City Baby's Revenge (1984)	Midnight Madness and Beyond (1986)

City Baby's Revenge is the second studio album released by British hardcore punk band Charged GBH. The title is a response to the band's 1982 debut album, City Baby Attacked by Rats.

== Release ==
The album was released by Clay Records in 1983 (Clay LP 8) and re-released in 2002 by punk reissue label Captain Oi! (Ahoy CD 186), with bonus tracks (A & B sides of the singles "Give Me Fire", "Catch 23" and "Do What You Do" EP).

== Critical reception ==
Professional ratings
Review scores
Source	Rating
AllMusic	4/5 stars

AllMusic wrote that the title track "ranks among punk's most vivid depictions of urban decay." SF Weekly called City Baby's Revenge a "real breakthrough ... on which the band developed its trademark sound: sweeping speed-metal rhythms coupled with a thundering double-bass bedrock, perfectly merging punk rage with Sabbath-style production."

Duff McKagan of Guns N' Roses puts City Baby's Revenge in his top 5 records.

== Track listing ==
1. "Diplomatic Immunity" - 2:16
2. "Drugs Party in 526" - 2:37
3. "See the Man Run" - 2:16
4. "Vietnamese Blues" - 3:57
5. "Womb with a View" - 2:57
6. "Forbidden Zone" - 3:09
7. "Valley of Death" - 3:09
8. "City Baby's Revenge" - 3:40
9. "Pins and Needles" - 3:34
10. "Christianized Cannibals" - 2:43
11. "Faster Faster" - 2:55
12. "High Octane Fuel" - 3:15
13. "I Feel Alright" - 3:41 (The Stooges cover)
14. "Skanga (Herby Weed)" - 3:26

== Bonus tracks (2002 reissue) ==
15. "Give Me Fire" - 2:51
16. "Mantrap" - 3:16
17. "Catch 23" - 2:52
18. "Hellhole" - 3:00
19. "Do What You Do" - 3:11
20. "Four Men" - 4:03
21. "Children of Dust" - 3:29
22. "Do What You Do" (Concrete Mix) - 5:42
