= Perkele (band) =

Swedish punk band

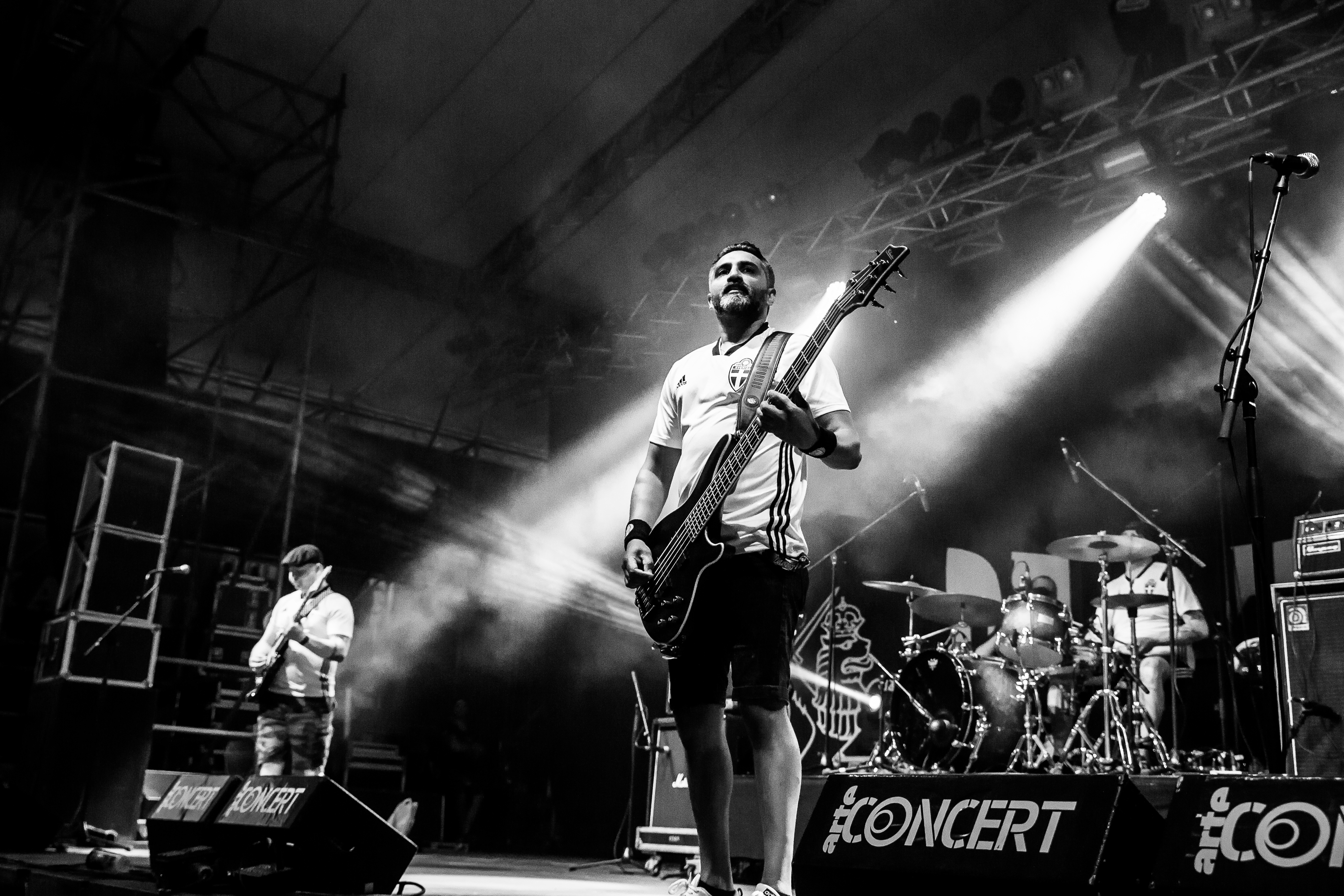
- Perkele at With Full Force 2018 in Germany

Background information
- Origin: Gothenburg, Sweden
- Genres: Oi!, punk rock, hard rock, heavy metal
- Years active: 1993–present
- Labels: Spirit of the Streets; Bandworm; Bronco Bullfrog; Blind Beggar
- Members: Ron Halinoja; Christopher Plumridge; John Sandberg

Perkele is a Swedish Oi! band from Gothenburg, formed in 1993.

== History ==
The band members actually started out as punks drawing some inspiration from Swedish folk music, but gradually the Oi! and street punk genres started having a greater influence on their development and around 1997/1998 Perkele became skinheads.

Despite their Swedish origin, perkele—the noun used for the band's name—is, in fact, a Finnish profanity. In a 2003 interview, lead vocalist and founding member Ron Halinoja cited his "roots in Finland" and the word's expressively vulgar nature as the main reasons behind choosing this for the band's name. Perkele claim to be strongly against all kinds of racism, nationalism, fascism, sexism, and homophobia as well as being opposed to hate, war, and environmental pollution. Despite this, in the past their appearance at traditionally left-wing events has caused controversy due to some of their songs featuring lyrical themes of Swedish and Finnish nationalist sentiments. Due to the background of their bassist Chris as an adoptee originally from Sri Lanka, the band have at one point experienced racist abuse from the audience at a concert in Belgium.

In late October 2019, in coordination with the event organisers, Perkele cancelled their scheduled performance in Warsaw with over two weeks' notice, citing low ticket sales as the primary reason. This caused a backlash from some of their fans, who questioned the band's motivations and criticised their profit-focused approach to music. Perkele replied to this by saying that they are no longer interested in "trying to be punk", causing more controversy among sections of their fanbase. However, the band eventually clarified their stance and issued an apology for cancelling the concert.

== Musical style and legacy ==
Perkele's sound has been described as punk with '70s/'80s heavy metal influences and elements of blues, jazz, and even classical music. Following decades of activity and shows across major European cities and the US, some have dubbed Perkele one of Europe's biggest punk bands and an important part of the genre's evolution. Then-lead vocalist and frontman of Booze & Glory, Mark Boozer, named Perkele as one of his top 10 favourite Oi! bands. They have been featured several times in the Maximum Rocknroll zine and were hosted by FC St. Pauli in 2003.

== Band members ==
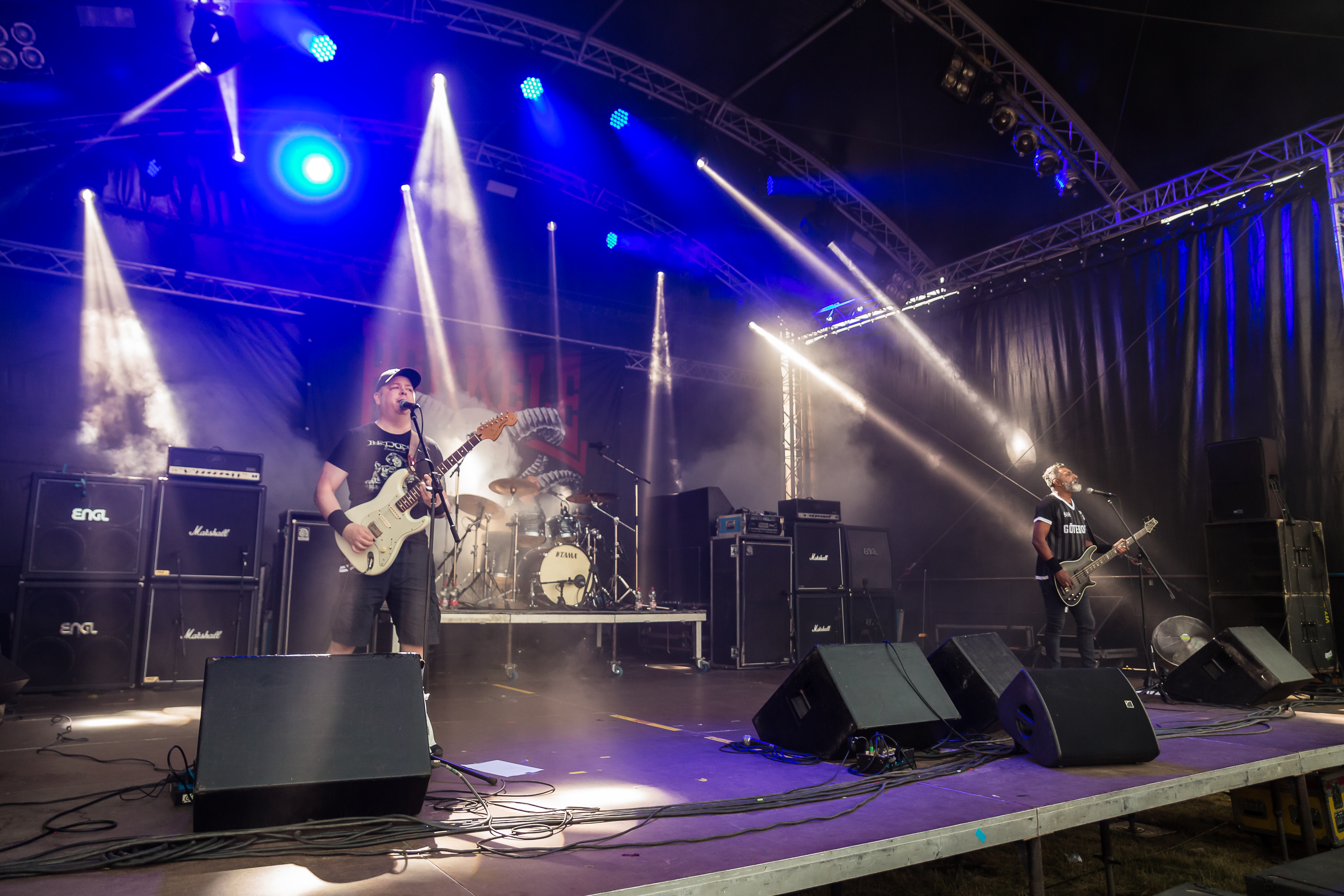
Perkele at Metal Frenzy 2023

Since Perkele's formation in 1993, the band's lineup underwent various changes up until 1998. After 1998, the band's members remained the same well into the 2000s. Eventually, John Sandberg replaced Jonsson on the drum kit.

=== Current members ===
- Ron Halinoja – vocals, guitar
- Christopher Anthony – bass guitar, vocals
- Jouni Haapala – drums

=== Former members ===
- Anders – guitar
- Olof – bass guitar
- Jonsson – drums
- John Sandberg – drums

== Discography ==
- Det Växande Hatet (1994)
- Från Flykt Till Kamp (1998)
- Voice of Anger (2001)
- No Shame (2002)
- Göteborg (2003)
- Stories from the Past (2004)
- Confront (2005)
- Songs for You – Live in Magdeburg (2008)
- Längtan (2008)
- Forever (2010)
- Punk Rock Army (2010)
- A Way Out (2013)
- Leaders of Tomorrow (2019)
- Back in Time (2023)
- Theater (2025)
