= GBH (band) =

British punk band

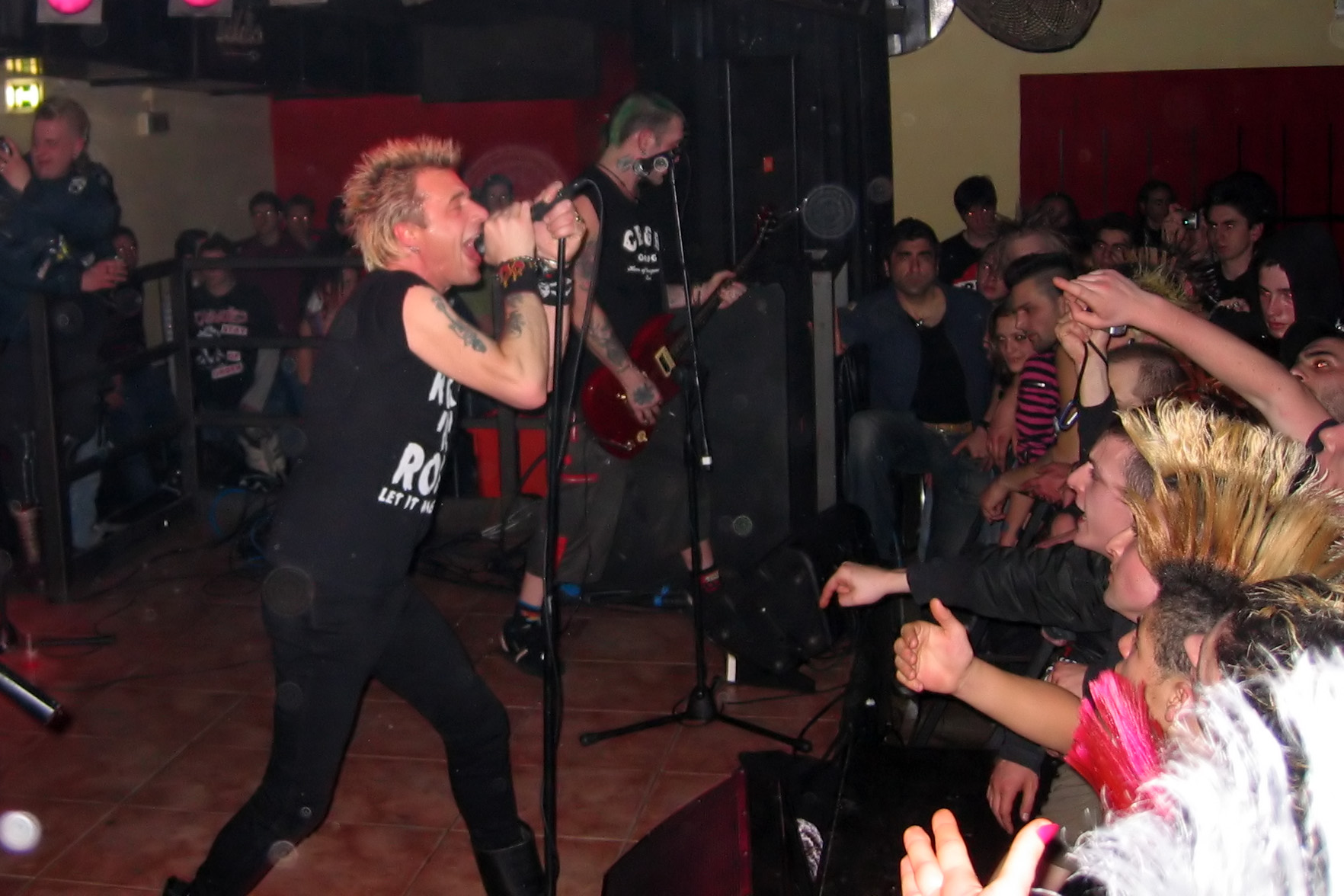
- GBH in 2006

Background information
- Also known as: Charged GBH
- Origin: Birmingham, England
- Genres: Street punk; punk rock; hardcore punk
- Years active: 1978–present
- Labels: Clay; Captain Oi!; Anagram; SOS; Cleopatra; Go Kart; Idol; Sanctuary; Castle; Hellcat; Rough Justice / Music for Nations; Roadrunner
- Members: Colin Abrahall; Ross Lomas; Colin "Jock" Blyth; Scott Preece
- Past members: Sean McCarthy; Andrew "Wilf" Williams; Kai Reder; Joseph Montanaro
- Website: gbhuk.com

GBH (originally known as Charged GBH) are an English punk rock band, formed in 1978 by vocalist Colin Abrahall, guitarist Colin "Jock" Blyth, bassist Sean McCarthy (replaced by Ross Lomas after two years) and drummer Andy "Wilf" Williams.

== Background ==
GBH were early pioneers of British street punk, often nicknamed "UK 82", along with Discharge, Broken Bones, The Exploited, and The Varukers. The band's name was originally Charged GBH, then was shortened to GBH. It is widely understood that the name came from then-bassist Sean McCarthy being charged with grievous bodily harm (GBH), though vocalist Colin Abrahall denied this in 2018, claiming it was just a name like U.K. Subs; and, when pushed, said the initials stood for "Girls, Booze, and Hash". Though the core line up of Colin, Ross, and Jock has stayed the same throughout their history, the drum stool has been occupied by a number of incumbents following Wilf's departure after the Midnight Madness and Beyond album and Oh No, It's GBH Again 12" EP. 1989 saw the arrival of German drummer Kai Reder who played on three albums (No Need to Panic, A Fridge Too Far, and From Here to Reality), as well as the Wot a Bargain 12". Kai was replaced by American Joe "Fish" Montanero for one album (Church of the Truly Warped); this was the band's last release for the Rough Justice label. The drum stool was then occupied from around 1994 by former Bomb Disneyland/Bomb Everything drummer Scott Preece, who has remained to this day and played on all releases since.

Throughout their recording history, the band has often included a cover version on many of their albums. "Boston Babies" originally recorded by Slaughter & the Dogs (on City Baby Attacked By Rats), "I Feel Alright" from The Damned and The Stooges (on City Baby's Revenge), "Avenues and Alleyways" by Tony Christie (on No Need to Panic), "Needle in a Haystack" originally by The Velvelettes (appeared on A Fridge Too Far), "Destroy" by The Vibrators (on From Here to Reality), "I Need Energy" by Zero Boys (on Church of the Truly Warped).

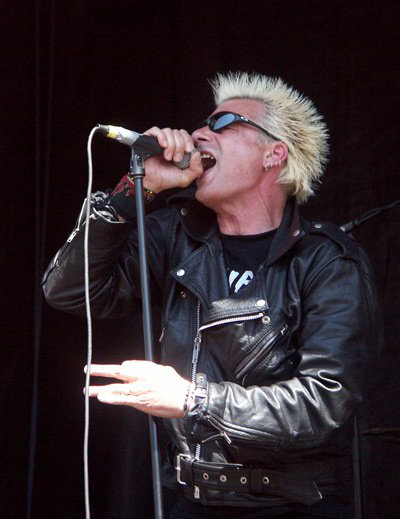
GBH performing on the Warped Tour

GBH embarked on several English and mainland US tours during the early 1980s, including several gigs at the 100 Club. 1982 saw the release of GBH's debut album, City Baby Attacked by Rats, which reached No. 17 in the UK Albums Chart, as well as No. 2 in the UK Indie Chart. The band's singles had also reached the UK Indie Chart, leading to an appearance on the UK TV programme The Tube, where they performed "Give Me Fire" (UK Indie Chart No. 2). Lyrically, the album dealt with criticism of British and European culture, violence, morbidity (especially in reference to the song "Passenger on the Menu", which describes in graphic detail the experiences of the passengers on the Uruguayan Air Force Flight 571), atheism, nihilism and humour. Musically, the album was loud and fast, with few songs exceeding three minutes. The success of the first album was repeated with their second album, City Babys Revenge, in 1983 and saw more extensive touring in America and Europe and higher profile UK shows, including the Carlisle Punk Festival. With the Carlisle Punk Festival the band co-headlined with fellow UK82 stalwarts The Exploited, and shared the bill with the likes of Toy Dolls, Chelsea, and The Destructors. In 1984, the band dropped the "Charged" from their name and became just GBH (grievous bodily harm).

They and many of their UK82 peers such as The Exploited, Picture Frame Seduction, Discharge, and The Varukers have all enjoyed success among punks in the United States. Although many of their contemporaries have evolved towards other styles over the years, GBH have remained fairly faithful to their original UK82 sound in subsequent releases. However, the band have experimented to some degree with a more speed metal-inflected, inspired and influenced sound particularly those of Motörhead and Tank, notably with their 1992 release Church of the Truly Warped, although they have since returned to a more purist punk sound.

The band are still active and touring and maintain a strong following both in the UK and the rest of Europe, as well as in the United States and Japan. The band released their twelfth studio album, Momentum, on Hellcat Records in 2017.

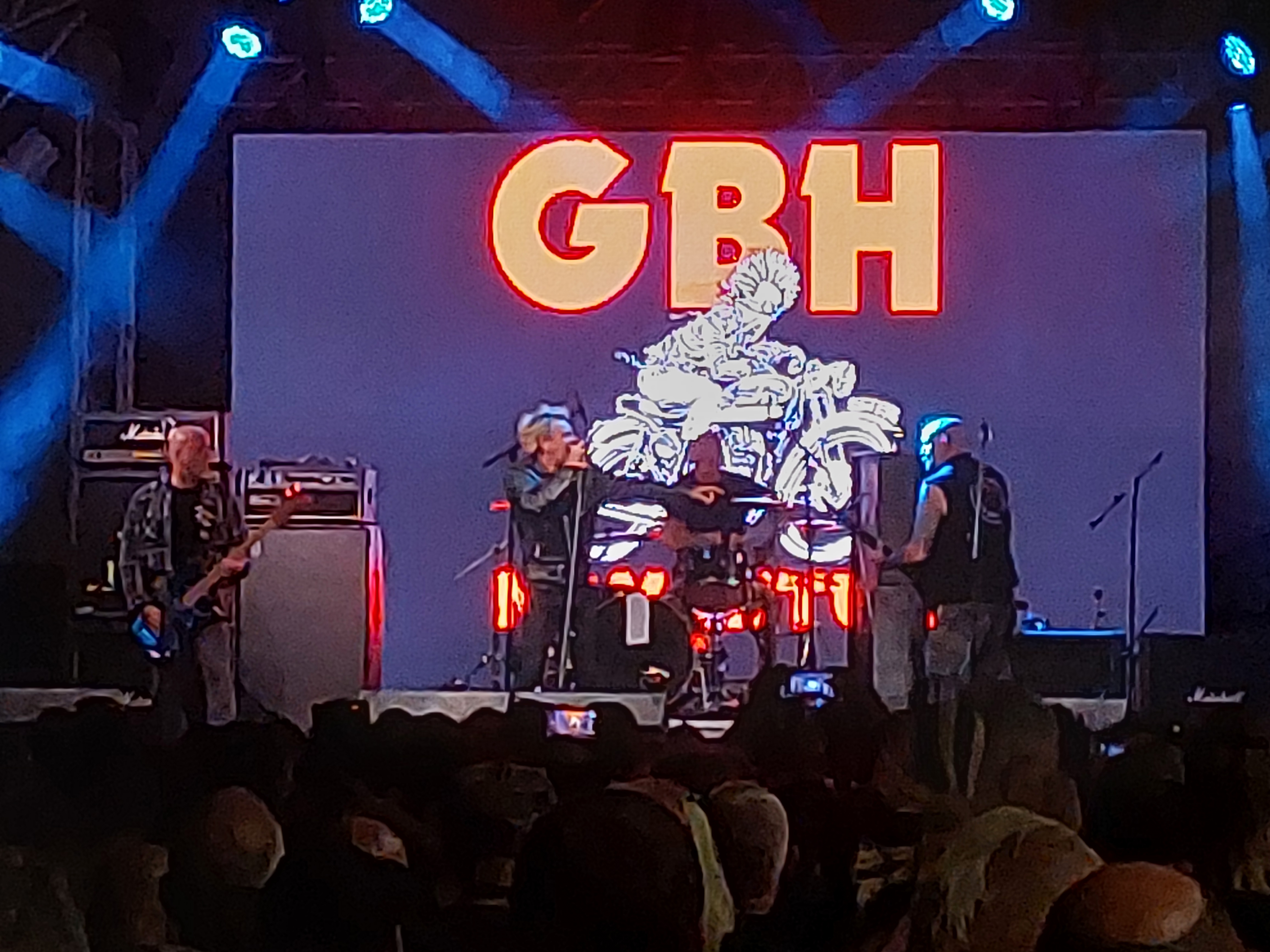
GBH performing at Rebellion Festival 2024

== Legacy ==
GBH have gone on to influence several punk rock musicians, but their influence has been especially far-reaching in metal, including the early Bathory albums, Hellhammer/Celtic Frost, Exodus, and all of the "big four of thrash metal" (Metallica, Megadeth, Slayer and Anthrax). Metallica frontman James Hetfield has repeatedly expressed his enthusiasm for GBH and said such bands were the beginning of thrash metal to him. Sascha Konietzko of KMFDM has said he had listened to second-wave punk bands before starting his own band, mentioning GBH as an example. GBH have also influenced 1990s and 2000s rock bands such as Nirvana, Queens of the Stone Age, Green Day, the Offspring, and Rancid.

== Band members ==
Current

- Colin Abrahall – vocals (1978–present)
- Colin "Jock" Blyth – guitar, backing vocals (1978–present)
- Ross Lomas – bass, backing vocals (1980–present)
- Scott Preece – drums (1994–present)

Former

- Sean McCarthy – bass (1978–1980)
- Andrew "Wilf" Williams – drums (1978–1986)
- Kai Reder – drums (1986–1992)
- Joseph "Fish" Montanaro – drums (1992–1994)

Timeline

== Discography ==
Studio albums

Year of release	Title	Label
1982	City Baby Attacked by Rats	Clay (Later Reissued by Captain Oi!)
1984	City Babys Revenge	Clay (Later Reissued by Captain Oi!)
1986	Midnight Madness and Beyond	Rough Justice (later reissued by Captain Oi!)
1987	No Need to Panic	Rough Justice (later reissued by Captain Oi!)
1989	A Fridge Too Far	Rough Justice (later reissued by Captain Oi!)
1990	From Here to Reality	Rough Justice (later reissued by Captain Oi!)
1992	Church of the Truly Warped	Rough Justice (later reissued by Captain Oi!)
1996	Punk Junkies	We Bite (later reissued by Captain Oi!)
2002	Ha Ha	Go Kart
2004	Cruel and Unusual	Idol
2010	Perfume and Piss	Hellcat
2017	Momentum	Hellcat

Mini album

Year of release	Title	Label
1981	Leather, Bristles, Studs and Acne	Clay (Later Reissued by Captain Oi!)

Split mini albums

Year of release	Title	Featuring	Label
1998	Punk as Fuck	Billyclub	Idol
2001	Punk Rock Ambulance	Billyclub	Idol

12 inch EPs / singles

Year of release	Title	Label
1984	Do What You Do	Clay
1986	Oh No, It's GBH Again	Rough Justice
1988	Wot a Bargain	Rough Justice

7-inch EPs / singles

Year of release	Title	Label
1982	No Survivors	Clay
1982	Sick Boy	Clay
1982	Give Me Fire / Man Trap	Clay
1983	Catch 23 / Hellhole	Clay
1984	Do What You Do	Clay

Live albums

Year of release	Title	Label
1989	No Survivors	Clay
1994	Live in Japan (Kawasaki, 1991)	Anagram
1996	Celebrity Live Style (later released as Live In Los Angeles on Anagram)	Cleopatra
2014	Dover Showplace 1983	Cleopatra
2015	Live at the Ace Brixton 1983	Radiation Reissues
2015	City Baby Attacked by Rats (CD album)	Secret Records
2020	Best of Live (vinyl)	Secret Records

Compilation albums

Year of release	Title	Label
1982	Leather, Bristles, No Survivors and Sick Boys...	Clay (Later Reissued by Captain Oi!)
1986	Clay Years 1981–1984	Clay
1989	No Survivors '83	Clay
1992	The Clay Recordings	Clay
1995	The Clay Punk Singles Collection	Clay
1999	Punk Rock Hits	Cleopatra
2002	The Punk Singles 1981–84	Castle
2005	Dead on Arrival: A Punk Rock Anthology	Sanctuary
2007	Race Against Time: The Complete Clay Recordings	Castle

Demos

Year of release	Title
1980	1980 Demo
1980	Practice 1980

Compilation appearances (selected)

Year of release	Title	Label
1981	Punk and Disorderly	Abstract/Posh Boy
1982	Burning Ambitions: A History of Punk	Cherry Red
1982	Punk and Disorderly – Further Charges	Anagram
1999	A Triple Dose of Punk – 60 Song box set	Cleopatra

== DVDs and videos ==
Year of Release	Title
1983	Live At Victoria Hall, Hanley
1986	Brit Boys Attacked By Brats
1995	Kawasaki Live
1996	Live in L.A. 1988
2003	Live at the Ace, Brixton
2004	Kawasaki Live/Brit Boys Attacked by Brats
2005	G.B.H. Live in LA/Live at Victoria
2006	Charged: On Stage
2016	City Baby Attacked By Rats (includes CD)
