= City Baby Attacked by Rats =

Studio album by Charged GBH
- Released: 15 April 1982
- Studio: FSR Studios, Birmingham
- Genre: Hardcore punk, street punk
- Length: 34:06
- Label: Clay Records (Clay LP 4) (UK), Captain Oi! (Ahoy CD 185)
- Producer: Mike "Clay" Stone

Charged GBH chronology
Leather, Bristles, Studs and Acne (1981)	City Baby Attacked by Rats (1982)	Leather, Bristles, No Survivors and Sick Boys... (1982)

Professional ratings
Review scores
Source	Rating
AllMusic	2.5/5 stars
Record Mirror	1/5 stars

City Baby Attacked by Rats is the debut album by the band Charged GBH. It was released in 1982 on Clay Records and was rereleased in 2002 by leading punk reissue label Captain Oi! with bonus tracks (A & B sides of singles "No Survivors" and "Sick Boy"). It is considered a landmark in the development of hardcore punk, especially the UK 82 scene. Recorded at Frank Skarth Recordings (FSR) in Birmingham, produced by Mike "Clay" Stone. It contains a rerecording of earlier single "Sick Boy".

== Track listing ==
1. "Time Bomb" - 2:26
2. "Sick Boy" - 2:32
3. "Wardogs" - 1:29
4. "Slut" - 2:32
5. "Maniac" - 2:12
6. "Gunned Down" - 2:34
7. "I Am the Hunted" - 2:52
8. "City Baby Attacked by Rats" - 2:34
9. "Prayer of a Realist" - 2:29
10. "Passenger on the Menu" - 2:48
11. "Heavy Discipline" - 2:11
12. "Boston Babies" - 2:07
13. "Bellend Bop" - 5:08

=== Captain Oi re-release bonus tracks ===
14. "No Survivors" - 2:35
15. "Self Destruct" - 2:01
16. "Big Women" - 2:17
17. "Am I Dead Yet?" - 2:31
18. "Slit Your Own Throat" - 2:07
19. "Sick Boy [Single Version]" - 2:34

== In popular culture ==
- Metallica vocalist and guitarist James Hetfield revealed that the title of their song Spit Out the Bone was lifted from the lyrics of "Passenger on the Menu".
